= United States at the 1932 Summer Olympics =

- Flag of the United States
- IOC code: USA
- NOC: United States Olympic Committee

in Los Angeles
- Competitors: 474 (400 men and 74 women) in 17 sports
- Flag bearer: Morgan Taylor
- Medals Ranked 1st: Gold 44 Silver 36 Bronze 30 Total 110

Summer Olympics appearances (overview)
- 1896; 1900; 1904; 1908; 1912; 1920; 1924; 1928; 1932; 1936; 1948; 1952; 1956; 1960; 1964; 1968; 1972; 1976; 1980; 1984; 1988; 1992; 1996; 2000; 2004; 2008; 2012; 2016; 2020; 2024

Other related appearances
- 1906 Intercalated Games

The United States was the host nation for the 1932 Summer Olympics in Los Angeles, California. 474 competitors, 400 men and 74 women, took part in 122 events in 17 sports.

== Medalists ==
Medal	Name	Sport	Event	Date
Gold	Babe Didrikson	Athletics	Women's javelin throw	July 31
Gold	Leo Sexton	Athletics	Men's shot put	July 31
Gold	Eddie Tolan	Athletics	Men's 100 m	August 1
Gold	Eddie Tolan	Athletics	Men's 200 m	August 1
Gold	Ed Gordon	Athletics	Men's long jump	August 2
Gold	Lillian Copeland	Athletics	Women's discus throw	August 2
Gold	George Saling	Athletics	Men's 110 m hurdles	August 3
Gold	Bill Miller	Athletics	Men's pole vault	August 3
Gold	John Anderson	Athletics	Men's discus throw	August 3
Gold	Robert Pearce	Wrestling	Men's freestyle bantamweight	August 3
Gold	Jack van Bebber	Wrestling	Men's freestyle welterweight	August 3
Gold	Peter Mehringer	Wrestling	Men's freestyle light heavyweight	August 3
Gold	Babe Didrikson	Athletics	Women's 80 m hurdles	August 4
Gold	Bill Carr	Athletics	Men's 400 m	August 5
Gold	James Bausch	Athletics	Men's decathlon	August 6
Gold	Hector Dyer; Bob Kiesel; Emmett Toppino; Frank Wykoff	Athletics	Men's 4 × 100 m relay	August 7
Gold	Ed Ablowich; Bill Carr; Ivan Fuqua; Karl Warner	Athletics	Men's 4 × 400 m relay	August 7
Gold	Mary Carew; Evelyn Furtsch; Annette Rogers; Wilhelmina von Bremen	Athletics	Women's 4 × 100 m relay	August 7
Gold	Jean Shiley	Athletics	Women's high jump	August 7
Gold	Michael Galitzen	Diving	Men's 3 m springboard	August 8
Gold	Helene Madison	Swimming	Women's 100 m freestyle	August 8
Gold	George Roth	Gymnastics	Men's Indian clubs	August 9
Gold	Georgia Coleman	Diving	Women's 3 m springboard	August 10
Gold	Raymond Bass	Gymnastics	Men's rope climbing	August 10
Gold	Rowland Wolfe	Gymnastics	Men's tumbling	August 10
Gold	Buster Crabbe	Swimming	Men's 400 m freestyle	August 10
Gold	Dallas Bixler	Gymnastics	Men's horizontal bar	August 11
Gold	Helene Madison	Swimming	Women's 400 m freestyle	August 11
Gold	Eleanor Holm	Swimming	Women's 100 m backstroke	August 11
Gold	Dorothy Poynton	Diving	Women's 10 m platform	August 12
Gold	George Gulack	Gymnastics	Men's rings	August 12
Gold	Gilbert Gray; Andrew Libano	Sailing	Star class	August 12
Gold	John Biby; Alphonse Burnand; Kenneth Carey; Owen Churchill; William Cooper; Pierpont Davis; Carl Dorsey; John Huettner; Richard Moore; Alan Morgan; Robert Sutton; Thomas Webster	Sailing	8 m class	August 12
Gold	Helen Johns; Helene Madison; Josephine McKim; Eleanor Saville	Swimming	Women's 4 × 100 m freestyle relay	August 12
Gold	Edward Flynn	Boxing	Men's welterweight	August 13
Gold	Carmen Barth	Boxing	Men's middleweight	August 13
Gold	Harold Smith	Diving	Men's 10 m platform	August 13
Gold	Edwin Argo; Harry Chamberlin; Earl Foster Thomson	Equestrian	Team eventing	August 13
Gold	William Gilmore; Ken Myers	Rowing	Men's double sculls	August 13
Gold	Edward Jennings; Charles Kieffer; Joseph Schauers	Rowing	Men's coxed pair	August 13
Gold	James Blair; Charles Chandler; David Dunlap; Norris Graham; Duncan Gregg; Winslow Hall; Burton Jastram; Edwin Salisbury; Harold Tower	Rowing	Men's eight	August 13
Silver	Bob Van Osdel	Athletics	Men's high jump	July 31
Silver	Harlow Rothert	Athletics	Men's shot put	July 31
Silver	Ralph Metcalfe	Athletics	Men's 100 m	August 1
Silver	George Simpson	Athletics	Men's 200 m	August 1
Silver	Glenn Hardin	Athletics	Men's 400 m hurdles	August 1
Silver	Lambert Redd	Athletics	Men's long jump	August 2
Silver	Ruth Osburn	Athletics	Women's discus throw	August 2
Silver	Percy Beard	Athletics	Men's 110 m hurdles	August 3
Silver	Henri LaBorde	Athletics	Men's discus throw	August 3
Silver	Edgar Nemir	Wrestling	Men's freestyle featherweight	August 3
Silver	Jack Riley	Wrestling	Men's freestyle heavyweight	August 3
Silver	Evelyne Hall	Athletics	Women's 80 m hurdles	August 4
Silver	Joseph Levis	Fencing	Men's foil	August 4
Silver	Ben Eastman	Athletics	Men's 400 m	August 5
Silver	Ralph Hill	Athletics	Men's 5000 m	August 5
Silver	Babe Didrikson	Athletics	Women's high jump	August 7
Silver	Harold Smith	Diving	Men's 3 m springboard	August 8
Silver	Philip Erenberg	Gymnastics	Men's Indian clubs	August 9
Silver	Frank Booth; George Fissler; Maiola Kalili; Manuella Kalili	Swimming	Men's 4 × 200 m freestyle relay	August 9
Silver	Frank Cumiskey; Frank Haubold; Al Jochim; Fred Meyer; Michael Schuler	Gymnastics	Men's team all-around	August 10
Silver	William Galbraith	Gymnastics	Men's rope climbing	August 10
Silver	Ed Gross	Gymnastics	Men's tumbling	August 10
Silver	Al Jochim	Gymnastics	Men's vault	August 10
Silver	Katherine Rawls	Diving	Women's 3 m springboard	August 10
Silver	Lenore Kight	Swimming	Women's 400 m freestyle	August 11
Silver	Georgia Coleman	Diving	Women's 10 m platform	August 12
Silver	Bill Denton	Gymnastics	Men's rings	August 12
Silver	Temple Ashbrook; Robert Carlson; Frederic Conant; Emmett Davis; Donald Wills Douglas, Jr. Charles Smith	Sailing	6 m class	August 12
Silver	Michael Galitzen	Diving	Men's 10 m platform	August 13
Silver	Earl Foster Thomson	Equestrian	Individual eventing	August 13
Silver	William Miller	Rowing	Men's single sculls	August 13
Silver	Harry Chamberlin	Equestrian	Individual jumping	August 14
Bronze	Henry Duey	Weightlifting	Men's 82.5 kg	July 30
Bronze	Tony Terlazzo	Weightlifting	Men's 60 kg	July 31
Bronze	Ralph Metcalfe	Athletics	Men's 200 m	August 1
Bronze	Morgan Taylor	Athletics	Men's 400 m hurdles	August 1
Bronze	Peter Zaremba	Athletics	Men's hammer throw	August 1
Bronze	Hugh Alessandroni; George Calnan; Dernell Every; Joseph Levis; Frank Righeimer; Richard Steere	Fencing	Men's team foil	August 1
Bronze	Joe McCluskey	Athletics	Men's 3000 m steeplechase	August 2
Bronze	Wilhelmina von Bremen	Athletics	Women's 100 m	August 2
Bronze	George Jefferson	Athletics	Men's pole vault	August 3
Bronze	Richard Mayo	Modern pentathlon		August 6
Bronze	George Calnan; Miguel de Capriles; Gustave Marinius Heiss; Tracy Jaeckel; Frank Righeimer; Curtis Shears	Fencing	Men's team épée	August 7
Bronze	Albert Schwartz	Swimming	Men's 100 m freestyle	August 7
Bronze	Richard Degener	Diving	Men's 3 m springboard	August 8
Bronze	Eleanor Saville	Swimming	Women's 100 m freestyle	August 8
Bronze	William Kuhlemeier	Gymnastics	Men's Indian clubs	August 9
Bronze	Jane Fauntz	Diving	Women's 3 m springboard	August 10
Bronze	Hiram Tuttle	Equestrian	Individual dressage	August 10
Bronze	Isaac Kitts; Alvin Moore; Hiram Tuttle	Equestrian	Team dressage	August 10
Bronze	Thomas Connolly	Gymnastics	Men's rope climbing	August 10
Bronze	William Herrmann	Gymnastics	Men's tumbling	August 10
Bronze	Ed Carmichael	Gymnastics	Men's vault	August 10
Bronze	United States men's national field hockey team: William Boddington; Harold Brewster; Roy Coffin; Amos Deacon; Horace Disston; Samuel Ewing; James Gentle; Henry Greer; Lawrence Knapp; David McMullin; Leonard O'Brien; Charles Sheaffer; Frederick Wolters; Warren Ingersoll	Field hockey		August 11
Bronze	Frank Haubold	Gymnastics	Men's pommel horse	August 11
Bronze	Marion Roper	Diving	Women's 10 m platform	August 12
Bronze	Louis Salica	Boxing	Men's flyweight	August 13
Bronze	Nathan Bor	Boxing	Men's lightweight	August 13
Bronze	Frederick Feary	Boxing	Men's heavyweight	August 13
Bronze	Frank Kurtz	Diving	Men's 10 m platform	August 13
Bronze	Jim Cristy	Swimming	Men's 1500 m freestyle	August 13
Bronze	United States men's national water polo team: Austin Clapp; Philip Daubenspeck; Charles Finn; Duke Kahanamoku; Charles McCallister; Wally O'Connor; Tex Robertson; Cal Strong; Herbert Wildman	Water polo		August 13

== Athletics ==
Key

- Note–Ranks given for track events are within the athlete's heat only
- Q = Qualified for the next round
- q = Qualified for the next round as a fastest loser or, in field events, by position without achieving the qualifying target
- N/A = Round not applicable for the event
- Bye = Athlete not required to compete in round

Men
Track & road events

Athlete	Event	Heat		Quarterfinal		Semifinal		Final	
Athlete	Event	Result	Rank	Result	Rank	Result	Rank	Result	Rank
Ralph Metcalfe	100 m	11.0	1 Q	10.77	1 Q	10.65	1 Q	10.38 WR	2nd place, silver medalist(s)
George Simpson	100 m	10.9	1 Q	10.74	1 Q	10.70	2 Q	10.53	4
Eddie Tolan	100 m	10.9	1 Q	10.53 OR	1 Q	10.81	1 Q	10.38 WR	1st place, gold medalist(s)
Ralph Metcalfe	200 m	22.9	2 Q	21.5 OR	1 Q	21.5	1 Q	21.5	3rd place, bronze medalist(s)
George Simpson	200 m	29.0	3 Q	21.5	2 Q	21.5	2 Q	21.4	2nd place, silver medalist(s)
Eddie Tolan	200 m	22.0	2 Q	21.5	1 Q	21.7	3 Q	21.12 OR	1st place, gold medalist(s)
Bill Carr	400 m	48.8	1 Q	48.4	1 Q	47.2 OR	1 Q	46.28 WR	1st place, gold medalist(s)
Ben Eastman	400 m	49.0	1 Q	48.8	1 Q	47.6	1 Q	46.50	2nd place, silver medalist(s)
James Gordon	400 m	50.6	1 Q	48.6	1 Q	48.2	3 Q	48.2	5
Edwin Genung	800 m	1:54.8	1 Q	—N/a				1:51.7	4
Chuck Hornbostel	800 m	1:52.4	1 Q	—N/a				1:52.7	6
Edwin Turner	800 m	1:54.0	3 Q	—N/a				1:52.5	5
Frank Crowley	1500 m	4:00.0	4 Q	—N/a				3:58.1	8
Glenn Cunningham	1500 m	3:55.8	1 Q	—N/a				3:53.4	4
Norwood Hallowell	1500 m	3:58.1	2 Q	—N/a				3:55.0	6
Daniel Dean	5000 m	15:19.6	7 Q	—N/a				15:08.5	8
Ralph Hill	5000 m	14:59.6	1 Q	—N/a				14:30.0	2nd place, silver medalist(s)
Paul Rekers	5000 m	15:34.6	2 Q	—N/a				Did not finish	
Lou Gregory	10000 m	—N/a						Did not finish	
Tom Ottey	10000 m	—N/a						Did not finish	
Eino Pentti	10000 m	—N/a						Did not finish	
Percy Beard	110 m hurdles	14.7	1 Q	—N/a		14.6	1 Q	14.69	2nd place, silver medalist(s)
Jack Keller	110 m hurdles	14.9	1 Q	—N/a		14.5 OR	1 Q	14.81	4
George Saling	110 m hurdles	15.0	2 Q	—N/a		14.4	1 Q	14.57	1st place, gold medalist(s)
Glenn Hardin	400 m hurdles	55.0	3 Q	—N/a		52.8 OR	1 Q	51.85 WR ^{[a]}	2nd place, silver medalist(s)
Joe Healey	400 m hurdles	54.2	1 Q	—N/a		53.2	4	Did not advance	
Morgan Taylor	400 m hurdles	55.8	1 Q	—N/a		52.9	2 Q	51.96	3rd place, bronze medalist(s)
Glen Dawson	3000 m steeplechase	9:15.0	3 Q	—N/a				10:58.0	6
Joe McCluskey	3000 m steeplechase	9:14.8	2 Q	—N/a				10:46.2	3rd place, bronze medalist(s)
Walter Pritchard	3000 m steeplechase	9:19.2	2 Q	—N/a				11:04.5	8
Hector Dyer; Bob Kiesel; Emmett Toppino; Frank Wykoff	4 × 100 m relay	40.61 WR	1 Q	—N/a				40.10 WR	1st place, gold medalist(s)
Ed Ablowich; Bill Carr; Ivan Fuqua; Karl Warner	4 × 400 m relay	3:11.8 WR	1 Q	—N/a				3:08.14 WR	1st place, gold medalist(s)
James Henigan	Marathon	—N/a						Did not finish	
Albert Michelsen	Marathon	—N/a						2:39:38	7
Hans Oldag	Marathon	—N/a						2:47:26	11
Bill Chisholm	50 km walk	—N/a						5:51:00	9
Ernest Crosbie	50 km walk	—N/a						5:28:02	8
Harry Hinkel	50 km walk	—N/a						Did not finish	

- ^{a} Bob Tisdall from Ireland won the gold medal in the 400 metres hurdles event, but Tisdall's time was rejected as a world record as he knocked over the last hurdle, as per the rules of the time; Hardin was therefore credited as world record holder.

Field events

Athlete	Event	Qualification		Final	
Athlete	Event	Distance	Position	Distance	Position
Dick Barber	Long jump	—N/a		7.39	5
Ed Gordon	Long jump	—N/a		7.64	1st place, gold medalist(s)
Lambert Redd	Long jump	—N/a		7.60	2nd place, silver medalist(s)
Sid Bowman	Triple jump	—N/a		14.87	7
Sol Furth	Triple jump	—N/a		14.88	6
Rolland Romero	Triple jump	—N/a		14.85	8
Corny Johnson	High jump	—N/a		1.97	4
George Spitz	High jump	—N/a		1.85	9
Bob Van Osdel	High jump	—N/a		1.97	2nd place, silver medalist(s)
Bill Graber	Pole vault	—N/a		4.150	4
George Jefferson	Pole vault	—N/a		4.200	3rd place, bronze medalist(s)
Bill Miller	Pole vault	—N/a		4.315 OR	1st place, gold medalist(s)
Nelson Gray	Shot put	—N/a		15.460	5
Harlow Rothert	Shot put	—N/a		15.675	2nd place, silver medalist(s)
Leo Sexton	Shot put	—N/a		16.005 OR	1st place, gold medalist(s)
John Anderson	Discus throw	—N/a		49.49 OR	1st place, gold medalist(s)
Paul Jessup	Discus throw	—N/a		45.25	8
Henri LaBorde	Discus throw	—N/a		48.47	2nd place, silver medalist(s)
Lee Bartlett	Javelin throw	—N/a		64.46	5
Kenneth Churchill	Javelin throw	—N/a		63.24	6
Malcolm Metcalf	Javelin throw	—N/a		61.89	7
Frank Conner	Hammer throw	—N/a		No mark	
Grant McDougall	Hammer throw	—N/a		49.12	5
Peter Zaremba	Hammer throw	—N/a		50.33	3rd place, bronze medalist(s)

Combined events – Decathlon

Athlete	Event	100 m	LJ	SP	HJ	400 m	110H	DT	PV	JT	1500 m	Final	Rank
James Bausch	Result	11.7	6.95	15.32	1.70	54.2	16.2	44.58	4.00	61.91	5:17.0	6735 WR	1st place, gold medalist(s)
James Bausch	Points	663	802	809	670	626	684	758	617	767	466	6735 WR	1st place, gold medalist(s)
Wilson Charles	Result	11.2	7.24	12.56	1.85	51.2	16.2	38.71	3.40	47.72	4:39.8	6716	4
Wilson Charles	Points	765	871	640	670	754	684	638	456	555	682	6716	4
Clyde Coffman	Result	11.3	6.77	11.86	1.70	51.8	17.8	34.40	4.00	48.88	4:48.0	6265	7
Clyde Coffman	Points	744	760	598	544	727	520	552	617	572	631	6265	7

Women
Track & road events

Athlete	Event	Heat		Quarterfinal		Semifinal		Final	
Athlete	Event	Result	Rank	Result	Rank	Result	Rank	Result	Rank
Ethel Harrington	100 m	12.7	5	—N/a		Did not advance			
Wilhelmina von Bremen	100 m	12.3	2 Q	—N/a		12.1	2 Q	12.0	3rd place, bronze medalist(s)
Elizabeth Wilde	100 m	12.4	1 Q	—N/a		12.4	2 Q	12.3	6
Babe Didrikson	80 m hurdles	11.8 WR	1	—N/a				11.7 WR	1st place, gold medalist(s)
Evelyne Hall	80 m hurdles	12.0	1	—N/a				11.7	2nd place, silver medalist(s)
Simone Schaller	80 m hurdles	11.8	2	—N/a				11.8	4
Mary Carew; Evelyn Furtsch; Annette Rogers; Wilhelmina von Bremen	4 × 100 m relay	—N/a						47.0 WR	1st place, gold medalist(s)

Field events

Athlete	Event	Qualification		Final	
Athlete	Event	Distance	Position	Distance	Position
Babe Didrikson	High jump	—N/a		1.65	2nd place, silver medalist(s)
Annette Rogers	High jump	—N/a		1.58	6
Jean Shiley	High jump	—N/a		1.65	1st place, gold medalist(s)
Lillian Copeland	Discus throw	—N/a		40.58 OR	1st place, gold medalist(s)
Margaret Jenkins	Discus throw	—N/a		30.22	9
Ruth Osburn	Discus throw	—N/a		40.12	2nd place, silver medalist(s)
Babe Didrikson	Javelin throw	—N/a		43.69 OR	1st place, gold medalist(s)
Nan Gindele	Javelin throw	—N/a		37.95	5
Gloria Russell	Javelin throw	—N/a		36.74	6

== Boxing ==
Athlete	Event	Round of 16	Quarterfinals	Semifinals	Final	
Athlete	Event	Opposition Result	Opposition Result	Opposition Result	Opposition Result	Rank
Louis Salica	Flyweight	Callura (CAN); W	Spannagel (GER); W	Énekes (HUN); L	Bronze medal bout Pardoe (GBR); W	3rd place, bronze medalist(s)
Joseph Lang	Bantamweight	Tirado (MEX); W	Pereyra (ARG); W	Ziglarski (GER); L	Bronze medal bout Villanueva (PHI); L	4
John Hines	Featherweight	Araico (MEX); W	Carlsson (SWE); L	Did not advance		
Nathan Bor	Lightweight	Mizler (GBR); W	Bye	Ahlqvist (SWE); L	Bronze medal bout Bianchini (ITA); W	3rd place, bronze medalist(s)
Edward Flynn	Welterweight	Sardella (ARG); W	Barton (RSA); W	McCleave (GBR); W	Campe (GER); W	1st place, gold medalist(s)
Carmen Barth	Middleweight	Bye	Cruz (MEX); W	Peirce (RSA); W	Azar (ARG); W	1st place, gold medalist(s)
John Miler	Light heavyweight	—N/a	Murphy (IRL); L	Did not advance		
Frederick Feary	Heavyweight	—N/a	Bye	Rovati (ITA); L	Bronze medal bout Maughan (CAN); W	3rd place, bronze medalist(s)

== Cycling ==
=== Road ===
Athlete	Event	Time	Rank
Frank Connell	Individual road race	2:37:20.4	17
Otto Luedeke	Individual road race	2:40:59.2	26
Henry O'Brien, Jr.	Individual road race	2:33:36.0	11
John Sinibaldi	Individual road race	2:44:01.2	29
Frank Connell; Otto Luedeke; Henry O'Brien, Jr.	Team road race	7:51:55.6	6
Bernard Mammes	1000 m time trial	1:18.0	8

=== Track ===
Sprint

Athlete	Event	Heats		Repechage		Quarterfinals	Semifinals	Final	
Athlete	Event	Time	Rank	Time	Rank	Opposition Time Speed (km/h)	Opposition Time Speed (km/h)	Opposition Time Speed (km/h)	Rank
Bobby Thomas	Sprint		3	13.1	1 Q	van Egmond (NED); L	Did not advance		
Royden Ingham; Frank Testa	Tandem				3	—N/a	Did not advance		

Pursuit

Athlete	Event	Qualification		Semifinals		Final	
Athlete	Event	Time	Rank	Opponent Results	Rank	Opponent Results	Rank
Harold Ade; Russell Allen; Ruggero Berti; Eddie Testa	Team pursuit	5:17.4	5	Did not advance			

== Diving ==
Men

Athlete	Event	Final	
Athlete	Event	Points	Rank
Richard Degener	3 m springboard	151.82	3rd place, bronze medalist(s)
Michael Galitzen	3 m springboard	161.38	1st place, gold medalist(s)
Harold Smith	3 m springboard	158.54	2nd place, silver medalist(s)
Michael Galitzen	10 m platform	124.28	2nd place, silver medalist(s)
Frank Kurtz	10 m platform	121.98	3rd place, bronze medalist(s)
Harold Smith	10 m platform	124.80	1st place, gold medalist(s)

Women

Athlete	Event	Final	
Athlete	Event	Points	Rank
Georgia Coleman	3 m springboard	87.52	1st place, gold medalist(s)
Jane Fauntz	3 m springboard	82.12	3rd place, bronze medalist(s)
Katherine Rawls	3 m springboard	82.56	2nd place, silver medalist(s)
Georgia Coleman	10 m platform	35.56	2nd place, silver medalist(s)
Dorothy Poynton-Hill	10 m platform	40.26	1st place, gold medalist(s)
Marion Roper	10 m platform	35.22	3rd place, bronze medalist(s)

== Equestrian ==
=== Dressage ===
Athlete	Horse	Event	Score	Rank
Isaac Kitts	American Lady	Individual	846.25	6
Alvin Moore	Water Pat	Individual	829.00	7
Hiram Tuttle	Olympic	Individual	901.50	3rd place, bronze medalist(s)
Isaac Kitts; Alvin Moore; Hiram Tuttle	See above	Team	2,576.75	3rd place, bronze medalist(s)

=== Eventing ===
Athlete	Horse	Event	Dressage		Cross-country			Jumping		Total	
Athlete	Horse	Event	Points	Rank	Points	Total	Rank	Points	Rank	Points	Rank
Eddie Argo	Honolulu Tomboy	Individual	333.000	2	907.5	1240.5	8	299.25	1	1539.250	8
Harry Chamberlin	Pleasant Smiles	Individual	340.333	1	1107.5	1447.833	4	240.00	=7	1687.833	4
Earl Foster Thomson	Jenny Camp	Individual	300.000	6	1271.0	1571.0	1	240.00	=7	1811.000	2nd place, silver medalist(s)
Eddie Argo; Harry Chamberlin; Earl Foster Thomson	See above	Team	973.333	1	3286.00	4259.333	1	779.250	1	5038.083	1st place, gold medalist(s)

=== Jumping ===
The team event was declared void as no nation completed the course with three riders.

Athlete	Horse	Event	Penalties	Rank
William Bradford	Joe Aleshire	Individual	24.0	4
Harry Chamberlin	Show Girl	Individual	12.0	2nd place, silver medalist(s)
John W. Wofford	Babe Wartham	Individual	Did not finish	

== Fencing ==
Men

Athlete	Event	Round 1		Semifinals		Final	
Athlete	Event	Points	Rank	Points	Rank	Points	Rank
George Calnan	Individual épée	12	5 Q	11	3 Q	12	7
Harold Corbin	Individual épée	4	9	Did not advance			
Gustave Heiss	Individual épée	8	4 Q	8	7	Did not advance	

Athlete	Event	Round 1			Semifinals			Final		
Athlete	Event	MW	ML	Rank	MW	ML	Rank	MW	ML	Rank
George Calnan; Miguel de Capriles; Gustave Heiss; Tracy Jaeckel; Frank Righeimer; Curtis Shears	Team épée	1	0	1 Q	1	0	1 Q	1	2	3rd place, bronze medalist(s)
Dernell Every	Individual foil	3	2	=4 Q	2	6	8	Did not advance		
Joseph Levis	Individual foil	5	2	3 Q	4	3	5 Q	6	3	2nd place, silver medalist(s)
Theodore Lorber	Individual foil	2	6	7	Did not advance					
Hugh Alessandroni; George Calnan; Dernell Every; Joseph Levis; Frank Righeimer; Richard Steere	Team foil	1	0	2 Q	—N/a			2	1	3rd place, bronze medalist(s)
Norman Armitage	Individual sabre	4	2	3 Q	3	4	4 Q	3	6	9
Peter Bruder	Individual sabre	3	3	5 Q	3	4	5 Q	Retired		
John Huffman	Individual sabre	4	4	6 Q	6	2	3 Q	5	4	6
Norman Armitage; Peter Bruder; Ralph Faulkner; John Huffman; Nickolas Muray; Harold Van Buskirk	Team sabre	Bye			—N/a			0	3	4

Women

Athlete	Event	Round 1			Final		
Athlete	Event	MW	ML	Rank	MW	ML	Rank
Muriel Guggolz	Individual foil	1	6	7	Did not advance		
Marion Lloyd	Individual foil	4	3	4 Q	2	7	8
Dorothy Locke	Individual foil	3	5	6	Did not advance		

== Field hockey ==
1. William Boddington
2. Harold Brewster (GK)
3. Roy Coffin
4. Amos Deacon
5. Horace Disston
6. Samuel Ewing
7. James Gentle
8. Henry Greer
9. Lawrence Knapp
10. David McMullin
11. Leonard O'Brien
12. Charles Sheaffer
13. Frederick Wolters
14. Warren Ingersoll

Pos	Team	Pld	W	D	L	GF	GA	GD	Pts
1st place, gold medalist(s)	India	2	2	0	0	35	2	+33	2
2nd place, silver medalist(s)	Japan	2	1	0	1	10	13	−3	1
3rd place, bronze medalist(s)	United States (H)	2	0	0	2	3	33	−30	0

Source: Sports Reference
(H) Hosts

August 8, 1932

United States	2 – 9	Japan

Umpires:
Charles Newham (IND)
P. Gupta (IND)

August 11, 1932

India	24 – 1	United States

Umpires:
Charles Newham (IND)
T. M. Spence (GBR)

== Gymnastics ==
=== Artistic ===
For the team event, the four best total individual scores determined the team's final score. To calculate total individual scores, results from all events with the exception of the pommel horse were added and divided by two, with the quotient added to the pommel horse score. Individual scores still counted for the individual all-around competition.

Team

Athlete	Event	Final						
Athlete	Event	Apparatus					Total	Rank
Athlete	Event	PH	R	V	PB	HB	Total	Rank
Frank Cumiskey	Team	55.9	46.8	26.525	50.0	52.3	129.025	—N/a
Frank Haubold	Team	56.9	46.9	25.725	56.0	53.8	132.525	—N/a
Al Jochim	Team	48.4	47.2	26.775	55.9	53.1	129.075	—N/a
Fred Meyer	Team	56.8	44.3	27.55	52.9	54.2	131.650	—N/a
Michael Schuler	Team	42.8	41.7	20.975	54.3	49.1	114.925	—N/a
Total	Team	—N/a					522.275	2nd place, silver medalist(s)

Individual

Apparatus and all-around events received separate scores.

Athlete	Event	Final						
Athlete	Event	Apparatus					Total	Rank
Athlete	Event	PH	R	V	PB	HB	Total	Rank
Richard Bishop	Rings	—N/a					55.4	4
Dallas Bixler	Horizontal bar	—N/a					55.0	1st place, gold medalist(s)
Ed Carmichael	Vault	—N/a					52.6	3rd place, bronze medalist(s)
Frank Cumiskey	All-around	55.9	46.8	26.525	50.0	52.3	129.025	11
Frank Cumiskey	Floor	—N/a					24.8	14
Frank Cumiskey	Pommel horse	—N/a					54.7	4
Bill Denton	Rings	—N/a					55.8	2nd place, silver medalist(s)
Marcel Gleyre	Vault	—N/a					52.4	5
George Gulack	Rings	—N/a					56.9	1st place, gold medalist(s)
Frank Haubold	All-around	56.9	46.9	25.725	56.0	53.8	132.525	6
Frank Haubold	Floor	—N/a					27.0	=4
Frank Haubold	Pommel horse	—N/a					55.7	3rd place, bronze medalist(s)
Frank Haubold	Parallel bars	—N/a					50.7	11
Al Jochim	All-around	48.4	47.2	26.775	55.9	53.1	129.075	10
Al Jochim	Floor	—N/a					26.4	=7
Al Jochim	Pommel horse	—N/a					51.2	6
Al Jochim	Vault	—N/a					53.3	2nd place, silver medalist(s)
Al Jochim	Parallel bars	—N/a					52.4	6
Al Jochim	Horizontal bar	—N/a					24.1	10
Fred Meyer	All-around	56.8	44.3	27.55	52.9	54.2	131.650	8
Fred Meyer	Floor	—N/a					25.3	=12
Michael Schuler	All-around	42.8	41.7	20.975	54.3	49.1	114.925	17
Michael Schuler	Floor	—N/a					24.3	16
Michael Schuler	Parallel bars	—N/a					51.8	9
Michael Schuler	Horizontal bar	—N/a					46.7	6

=== Indian clubs ===
Athlete	Event	Points	Rank
Philip Erenberg	Indian clubs	26.7	2nd place, silver medalist(s)
William Kuhlemeier	Indian clubs	25.9	3rd place, bronze medalist(s)
George Roth	Indian clubs	26.9	1st place, gold medalist(s)

=== Rope climbing ===
Athlete	Event	Trials			Final	
Athlete	Event	1st time	2nd time	3rd time	Time	Rank
Raymond Bass	Rope climbing	6.7	6.8	6.9	6.7	1st place, gold medalist(s)
Thomas F. Connolly	Rope climbing	7.1	7.0	7.2	7.0	3rd place, bronze medalist(s)
William Galbraith	Rope climbing	7.0	6.8	7.0	6.8	2nd place, silver medalist(s)

=== Tumbling ===
Athlete	Event	Exercises			Final
Athlete	Event	1st exercise	2nd exercise	Points	Rank
Ed Gross	Tumbling	27.6	28.4	56.0	2nd place, silver medalist(s)
William Herrmann	Tumbling	26.6	28.5	55.1	3rd place, bronze medalist(s)
Rowland Wolfe	Tumbling	28.3	28.4	56.7	1st place, gold medalist(s)

== Modern pentathlon ==
Athlete	Fencing (épée one touch)		Swimming (300 m freestyle)		Riding (cross-country)			Shooting (10 m air pistol)		Running (4000 m)		Total points	Final rank
Athlete	Results (W–D–L)	Rank	Time	Rank	Penalties	Time	Rank	Points	Rank	Time	Rank	Total points	Final rank
Brookner Brady	11–3–9	12	4:37.9	3	100	8:50.6	5	174	20	17:33.6	16	56	11
Clayton Mansfield	14–1–8	=7	4:54.0	6	90	9:09.4	13	182	16	17:41.4	18	60.5	13
Richard Mayo	14–3–6	=4	5:17.4	14	100	8:10.2	2	197	1	17:37.2	17	38.5	3rd place, bronze medalist(s)

== Rowing ==
Athlete	Event	Heats		Repechage		Final	
Athlete	Event	Time	Rank	Time	Rank	Time	Rank
William Miller	Single sculls	7:29.2	2	8:05.8	1 Q	7:45.2	2nd place, silver medalist(s)
William Gilmore; Ken Myers	Double sculls	7:14.6	1 Q	Bye		7:17.4	1st place, gold medalist(s)
Eugene Clark; Thomas Clark	Coxless pair	8:03.2	3	8:23.0	4	Did not advance	
Edward Jennings; Charles Kieffer; Joseph Schauers	Coxed pair	—N/a				8:25.8	1st place, gold medalist(s)
Edgar Johnson; George Mattson; John McCosker; Thomas Pierie	Coxless four	7:19.4	2	7:18.4	2 Q	7:14.2	4
Charles Drueding; Francis English; Harry Grossmiller; Thomas Mack, Jr. Edward Marshall	Coxed four	7:06.6	2	7:14.6	3	Did not advance	
James Blair; Charles Chandler; David Dunlap; Norris Graham; Duncan Gregg; Winslow Hall; Burton Jastram; Edwin Salisbury; Harold Tower	Eight	6:29.0	1 Q	Bye		6:37.6	1st place, gold medalist(s)

== Sailing ==
Athlete	Event	Race											Total points	Final rank
Athlete	Event	1	2	3	4	5	6	7	8	9	10	11	Total points	Final rank
Charles Lyon; Joseph Jessop	Snowbird	9	9	4	0	4	5	9	6	5	11	4	66	7
Gilbert Gray; Andrew Libano	Star	7	5	7	7	7	6	7	—N/a				46	1st place, gold medalist(s)
Temple Ashbrook; Robert Carlson; Frederic Conant; Emmett Davis; Charles Smith; Donald Wills Douglas, Jr.	6 Metre	2	2	2	2	2	2	—N/a					12	2nd place, silver medalist(s)
John Biby; Alphonse Burnand; Kenneth Carey; Owen Churchill; William Cooper; Pierpont Davis; Carl Dorsey; John Huettner; Richard Moore; Alan Morgan; Robert Sutton; Thomas Webster	8 Metre	2	2	2	2	—N/a							8	1st place, gold medalist(s)

== Shooting ==
Athlete	Event	Round 1		Round 2		Round 3		Round 4		Round 5		Round 6		Final	
Athlete	Event	Points	Rank	Points	Rank	Points	Rank	Points	Rank	Points	Rank	Points	Rank	Points	Rank
Thomas Carr	25 m rapid fire pistol	18	12	5	12	Did not advance									
Ernest Tippin	25 m rapid fire pistol	16	16	Did not advance											
Luther Roberts	25 m rapid fire pistol	18	12	6	7	5	7	Did not advance							
William Harding	50 m rifle, prone	—N/a												292	6
Edward Shumaker	50 m rifle, prone	—N/a												288	=13
Rom Stanifer	50 m rifle, prone	—N/a												287	15

== Swimming ==
Men

Athlete	Event	Heat		Semifinal		Final	
Athlete	Event	Time	Rank	Time	Rank	Time	Rank
Manuella Kalili	100 m freestyle	59.6	1 Q	59.3	3 Q	59.2	4
Albert Schwartz	100 m freestyle	59.6	2 Q	59.2	3 Q	58.8	3rd place, bronze medalist(s)
Raymond Thompson	100 m freestyle	1:02.0	2 Q	59.3	2 Q	59.5	6
Buster Crabbe	400 m freestyle	4:59.8	1 Q	4:52.7	1 Q	4:48.4 OR	1st place, gold medalist(s)
James Gilhula	400 m freestyle	4:53.3	2 Q	4:55.4	4	Did not advance	
Buster Crabbe	1500 m freestyle	20:01.0	2 Q	19:51.8	2 Q	20:02.7	5
Jim Cristy	1500 m freestyle	19:58.4	1 Q	20:06.9	3 Q	19:39.5	3rd place, bronze medalist(s)
Ralph Flanagan	1500 m freestyle	20:06.0	1 Q	20:03.7	5	Did not advance	
Gordon Chalmers	100 m backstroke	1:17.2	2 Q	1:11.6	4	Did not advance	
Robert Kerber	100 m backstroke	1:13.0	2 Q	1:13.0	3 Q	1:12.8	6
Dan Zehr	100 m backstroke	1:09.9	1 Q	1:11.6	2 Q	1:10.9	4
Basil Francis	200 m breaststroke	2:57.2	4	Did not advance			
Edwin Moles	200 m breaststroke	2:56.8	4	Did not advance			
John Paulson	200 m breaststroke	3:00.1	4	Did not advance			
Frank Booth; George Fissler; Maiola Kalili; Manuella Kalili	4 × 200 m freestyle relay	—N/a				9:10.5	2nd place, silver medalist(s)

Women

Athlete	Event	Heat		Semifinal		Final	
Athlete	Event	Time	Rank	Time	Rank	Time	Rank
Helene Madison	100 m freestyle	1:08.9 OR	1 Q	1:09.9	1 Q	1:06.8 OR	1st place, gold medalist(s)
Josephine McKim	100 m freestyle	1:09.3	2 Q	1:08.8	3 Q	1:09.3	4
Eleanor Saville	100 m freestyle	1:08.5 OR	1 Q	1:08.8	2 Q	1:08.2	3rd place, bronze medalist(s)
Norene Forbes	400 m freestyle	5:57.8	2 Q	6:22.1	3 Q	6:06.0	6
Lenore Kight	400 m freestyle	5:40.9 OR	1 Q	5:50.8	1 Q	5:28.6	2nd place, silver medalist(s)
Helene Madison	400 m freestyle	5:44.5	1 Q	5:48.7	1 Q	5:28.5 WR	1st place, gold medalist(s)
Eleanor Holm	100 m backstroke	—N/a		1:18.3 OR	1 Q	1:19.4	1st place, gold medalist(s)
Joan McSheehy	100 m backstroke	—N/a		1:22.5	2 Q	1:23.2	5
Jane Cadwell	200 m breaststroke	—N/a		3:20.0	3 q	3:18.2	7
Ann Govednik	200 m breaststroke	—N/a		3:15.9	2 Q	3:16.0	6
Margaret Hoffman	200 m breaststroke	—N/a		3:14.7	2 Q	3:11.8	5
Helen Johns; Helene Madison; Josephine McKim; Eleanor Saville	4 × 100 m freestyle relay	—N/a				4:38.0 WR	1st place, gold medalist(s)

== Water polo ==
No.	Name	Pos.	Date of birth	Club
1	Herbert Wildman	GK	September 6, 1912	(United States) Los Angeles Athletic Club
2	Cal Strong	B	August 12, 1907	(United States) Los Angeles Athletic Club
3	Charles Finn	B	July 28, 1897	(United States) Los Angeles Athletic Club
4	Charles McCallister	B	October 14, 1903	(United States) Los Angeles Athletic Club
5	Philip Daubenspeck	F	October 28, 1905	(United States) Los Angeles Athletic Club
6	Austin Clapp	F	September 8, 1910	(United States) Los Angeles Athletic Club
7	Wally O'Connor	F	August 25, 1903	(United States) Los Angeles Athletic Club
	Tex Robertson			

Head coach: Frank Rivas

Results

Pos	Team	Pld	W	D	L	GF	GA	GD	Pts
1st place, gold medalist(s)	Hungary	3	3	0	0	31	2	+29	6
2nd place, silver medalist(s)	Germany	3	1	1	1	16	10	+6	3
3rd place, bronze medalist(s)	United States	3	1	1	1	14	11	+3	3
4	Japan	3	0	0	3	0	38	−38	0
DSQ	Brazil	0	0	0	0	0	0	0	0 (Note: Brazil were ejected from the competition after their players assaulted referee Bela Komjadi and other officials following the end of their match against Germany, resulting in the entire team being arrested. Their two matches were annulled.)

Source: sports-reference
Notes:

United States	6–1	Brazil	Referees: W. G. Emery (GBR)

Japan	0–10	United States	Referees: A. Delahaye (BEL)

Germany	4–4	United States	Referees: A. Delahaye (BEL)

Hungary	7–0	United States	Referees: A. Delahaye (BEL)

== Weightlifting ==
Athlete	Event	Clean & Press		Snatch		Clean & Jerk		Total	Rank
Athlete	Event	Result	Rank	Result	Rank	Result	Rank	Total	Rank
Richard Bachtell	Men's −60 kg	70	6	80	5	102.5	=6	252.5	6
Tony Terlazzo	Men's −60 kg	82.5	=2	85	3	112.5	=3	280	3rd place, bronze medalist(s)
Arnie Sundberg	Men's −67.5 kg	77.5	6	90	=3	117.5	5	285	5
Walter Zagurski	Men's −67.5 kg	82.5	=4	90	=4	112.5	6	285	6
Stanley Kratkowski	Men's −75 kg	82.5	6	102.5	=5	120	=5	335	5
Sam Termine	Men's −75 kg	87.5	5	105	=3	NM	7	192.5	7
Henry Duey	Men's −82.5 kg	92.5	4	105	3	132.5	=2	330	3rd place, bronze medalist(s)
Bill Good	Men's −82.5 kg	95	3	97.5	4	130	4	322.5	4
Albert Manger	Men's +82.5 kg	100	4	92.5	5	122.5	5	315	5
Howard Turbyfill	Men's +82.5 kg	77.5	6	95	5	132.5	5	305	6

== Wrestling ==
Key:

- F - Fall.
- D - Decision

Freestyle

Wrestlers who accumulated 5 "bad points" were eliminated. Points were given as follows: 1 point for victories short of a fall and 3 points for every loss.

Athlete	Event	Round 1	Round 2	Round 3	Round 4	Final	Points	Rank
Athlete	Event	Opposition Result	Opposition Result	Opposition Result	Opposition Result	Opposition Result	Points	Rank
Robert Pearce	–56 kg	Zombori (HUN); W ^{D}	Depuychaffray (FRA); W ^{D}	Reid (GBR); W ^{D}	—N/a	Jaskari (FIN); W ^{D}	4	1st place, gold medalist(s)
Edgar Nemir	–61 kg	Schack (DEN); W ^{D}	Rowland (CAN); W ^{F}	H. Pihlajamäki (FIN); L ^{D}	Taylor (GBR); W ^{F}	Bye	4	2nd place, silver medalist(s)
Marvin Clodfelter	–66 kg	K. Pihlajamäki (FIN); W ^{D}	Klarén (SWE); L ^{F}	Kárpáti (HUN); W ^{F} Rematch; Kárpáti (HUN); W ^{D}	Did not advance		5	=4
Jack van Bebber	–72 kg	López (MEX); W ^{F}	Jensen (DEN); W ^{D}	MacDonald (CAN); W ^{D}	Bye	Leino (FIN); W ^{D}	3	1st place, gold medalist(s)
Robert Hess	–79 kg	Bye	Tunyogi (HUN); L ^{D}	Luukko (FIN); W ^{F}	—N/a	Johansson (SWE); L ^{F}	6	4
Peter Mehringer	–87 kg	Sjöstedt (SWE); W ^{F}	Madison (CAN); W ^{F}	—N/a		Scarf (AUS); W ^{D}	1	1st place, gold medalist(s)
Jack Riley	+87 kg	Richthoff (SWE); L ^{D}	Bye	—N/a		Hirschl (AUT); W ^{F}	3	2nd place, silver medalist(s)
