= France at the 1932 Summer Olympics =

- IOC code: FRA
- NOC: French Olympic Committee

in Los Angeles
- Competitors: 103 (97 men and 6 women) in 13 sports
- Flag bearer: Jules Noël
- Medals Ranked 3rd: Gold 10 Silver 5 Bronze 4 Total 19

Summer Olympics appearances (overview)
- 1896; 1900; ~~1904~~; 1908; 1912; 1920; 1924; 1928; 1932; 1936; 1948; 1952; 1956; 1960; 1964; 1968; 1972; 1976; 1980; 1984; 1988; 1992; 1996; 2000; 2004; 2008; 2012; 2016; 2020; 2024; 2028

Other related appearances
- 1906 Intercalated Games

France competed at the 1932 Summer Olympics in Los Angeles, United States. 103 competitors, 97 men and 6 women, took part in 56 events in 13 sports.

== Medalists ==
Medal	Name	Sport	Event	Date
Gold	Louis Chaillot, Maurice Perrin	Cycling	Men's tandem	3 August
Gold	Xavier Lesage	Equestrian	Individual dressage	10 August
Gold	André Jousseaume, Xavier Lesage, Charles Marion	Equestrian	Team dressage	10 August
Gold	Georges Buchard, Philippe Cattiau, Fernand Jourdant, Jean Piot, Bernard Schmetz, Georges Tainturier	Fencing	Men's team épée	7 August
Gold	René Bondoux, René Bougnol, Philippe Cattiau, Edward Gardère, René Lemoine, Jean Piot	Fencing	Men's team foil	1 August
Gold	Jacques Lebrun	Sailing	Snowbird class	12 August
Gold	Raymond Suvigny	Weightlifting	Men's 60 kg	31 July
Gold	René Duverger	Weightlifting	Men's 67.5 kg	30 July
Gold	Louis Hostin	Weightlifting	Men's 82.5 kg	30 July
Gold	Charles Pacôme	Wrestling	Men's freestyle lightweight	3 August
Silver	Louis Chaillot	Cycling	Men's sprint	3 August
Silver	Paul Chocque, Amédée Fournier, René Le Grevès, Henri Mouillefarine	Cycling	Men's team pursuit	2 August
Silver	Charles Marion	Equestrian	Individual dressage	10 August
Silver	Georges Buchard	Fencing	Men's épée	9 August
Silver	Jean Taris	Swimming	Men's 400 m freestyle	10 August
Bronze	Paul Winter	Athletics	Men's discus throw	3 August
Bronze	Charles Rampelberg	Cycling	Men's 1000 m time trial	1 August
Bronze	Pierre Brunet, Anselme Brusa, André Giriat	Rowing	Men's coxed pair	13 August
Bronze	Louis François	Wrestling	Men's Greco-Roman bantamweight	7 August

== Cycling ==
Eight cyclists, all men, represented France in 1932.

Individual road race

- Paul Chocque
- Amédée Fournier
- Henri Mouillefarine
- Georges Conan

Team road race

- Paul Chocque
- Amédée Fournier
- Henri Mouillefarine

Sprint

- Louis Chaillot

Time trial

- Charles Rampelberg

Tandem

- Maurice Perrin
- Louis Chaillot

Team pursuit

- Amédée Fournier
- René Le Grevès
- Henri Mouillefarine
- Paul Chocque

== Diving ==
Men

Athlete	Event	Final	
Athlete	Event	Points	Rank
Émile Poussard	3 m springboard	128.66	7

== Fencing ==
Eleven fencers, ten men and a woman, represented France in 1932.

Men's foil

- René Bougnol
- Philippe Cattiau
- Edward Gardère

Men's team foil

- Edward Gardère, René Lemoine, René Bondoux, René Bougnol, Philippe Cattiau, Jean Piot

Men's épée

- Georges Buchard
- Bernard Schmetz
- Philippe Cattiau

Men's team épée

- Fernand Jourdant, Bernard Schmetz, Georges Tainturier, Georges Buchard, Jean Piot, Philippe Cattiau

Men's sabre

- Edward Gardère
- Jean Piot

Women's foil

- Jeanne Vical

== Modern pentathlon ==
One male pentathlete represented France in 1932.

- Ivan Duranthon

== Swimming ==
Men

Athlete	Event	Heat		Semifinal		Final	
Athlete	Event	Time	Rank	Time	Rank	Time	Rank
Jean Taris	400 m freestyle	4:53.3	2 Q	4:52.3	2 Q	4:48.5	2nd place, silver medalist(s)
Jean Taris	1500 m freestyle	20:01.2	5 q	20:04.2	7 Q	20:09.7	6
Marcel Noual	100 m backstroke	DSQ		Did not advance			
Ulysse Cartonnet	200 m breaststroke	2:50.8	4 q	2:50.9	6	Did not advance	
Alfred Schoebel	200 m breaststroke	2:56.6	11	Did not advance			

Women

Athlete	Event	Heat		Semifinal		Final	
Athlete	Event	Time	Rank	Time	Rank	Time	Rank
Yvonne Godard	100 m freestyle	1:12.2	10 Q	1:14.1	9	Did not advance	
Yvonne Godard	400 m freestyle	5:57.8	7 q	6:00.1	3 Q	5:54.4	5
