= Equestrian at the 1932 Summer Olympics – Individual dressage =

Equestrian at the Olympics

Individual dressage at the Games of the X Olympiad
- Venue: Riviera Country Club
- Date: 10 August 1932
- Competitors: 10 from 4 nations

Medalists
1st place, gold medalist(s)		Xavier Lesage	France
2nd place, silver medalist(s)		Charles Marion	France
3rd place, bronze medalist(s)		Hiram Tuttle	United States

The individual dressage in equestrian at the 1932 Olympic Games in Los Angeles was held at the Riviera Country Club in Pacific Palisades on 10 August. France's Xavier Lesage won the gold medal and his countrymen Charles Marion the silver. The bronze was won by Hiram Tuttle of the United States.

== Competition format ==
The team and individual dressage competitions used the same results. Competition consisted of a single phase, with the final standings decided by ordinals. Ties were broken using total points.

== Results ==
Rank	Rider	Nation	Horse	Jury 1		Jury 2		Jury 3		Total	
Rank	Rider	Nation	Horse	Points	Rank	Points	Rank	Points	Rank	Points	Rank
1st place, gold medalist(s)	Xavier Lesage	France	Taine	335.50	2	368.50	1	327.25	3	1031.25	6
2nd place, silver medalist(s)	Charles Marion	France	Linon	263.25	7	363.25	2	289.75	5	916.25	14
3rd place, bronze medalist(s)	Hiram Tuttle	United States	Olympic	341.25	1	298.25	4	262.00	9	901.50	14
4	Thomas Byström	Sweden	Gulliver	247.75	8	279.75	6	353.00	2	880.50	16
5	André Jousseaume	France	Sorelta	276.75	6	316.50	3	278.00	8	871.25	17
6	Isaac Kitts	United States	American Lady	291.50	4	271.50	7	283.25	6	846.25	17
7	Alvin Moore	United States	Water Pat	281.50	5	267.50	8	280.00	7	829.00	20
8	Gustaf Boltenstern, Jr.	Sweden	Ingo	247.75	8	261.75	9	324.00	4	833.50	21
9	Gabriel Gracida	Mexico	El Paso	195.75	10	208.00	10	197.75	10	601.50	30
10	Bertil Sandström^{[a]}	Sweden	Kreta	298.00	3	291.25	5	374.75	1	964.00	9

- ^{a} Sandström was placed last by the Jury for violation of a rule of the FEI.
