= Fencing at the 1932 Summer Olympics – Men's team épée =

Men's team épée at the Games of the X Olympiad
- Venue: 160th Regiment State Armory
- Dates: 5–7 August 1932
- Competitors: 32 from 7 nations

Medalists
1st place, gold medalist(s)		Fernand Jourdant; Bernard Schmetz; Georges Tainturier; Georges Buchard; Jean Piot; Philippe Cattiau	France
2nd place, silver medalist(s)		Carlo Agostoni; Franco Riccardi; Renzo Minoli; Saverio Ragno; Giancarlo Cornaggia-Medici	Italy
3rd place, bronze medalist(s)		George Calnan; Gustave Heiss; Tracy Jaeckel; Miguel de Capriles; Curtis Shears; Frank Righeimer	United States

The men's team épée was one of seven fencing events on the fencing at the 1932 Summer Olympics programme. It was the sixth appearance of the event. The competition was held from 5 August 1932 to 7 August 1932. 32 fencers from 7 nations competed, with two other nations entering but not appearing. Each team could have a maximum of six fencers, with four participating in any given match.

The competition format continued the pool play round-robin from prior years, but increased the number of touches to win a bout to 3. Each of the four fencers from one team would face each of the four from the other, for a total of 16 bouts per match. The team that won more bouts won the match. Matches were sometimes stopped when one team had mathematically won (e.g., Belgium against Canada was stopped at 9–2), but sometimes not (United States against Canada played all the way to 15–1). Pool matches unnecessary to the result were not played (with Belgium and the United States both beating Canada, the result between those two countries would not affect qualification and thus they did not face each other; the same thing happened in the semifinal with Italy and Belgium).

== Rosters ==
Belgium

- André Poplimont
- Max Janlet
- Balthazar De Beukelaer
- Werner Mund
- Raoul Henkart

Canada

- Ernest Dalton
- Bertram Markus
- Patrick Farrell
- Henri Delcellier

Denmark

- Axel Bloch
- Aage Leidersdorff
- Erik Kofoed-Hansen
- Ivan Osiier

France

- Fernand Jourdant
- Bernard Schmetz
- Georges Tainturier
- Georges Buchard
- Jean Piot
- Philippe Cattiau

Italy

- Carlo Agostoni
- Franco Riccardi
- Renzo Minoli
- Saverio Ragno
- Giancarlo Cornaggia-Medici

Mexico

- Gerónimo Delgadillo
- Eduardo Prieto Souza
- Eduardo Prieto
- Francisco Valero

United States

- George Calnan
- Gustave Heiss
- Tracy Jaeckel
- Miguel de Capriles
- Curtis Shears
- Frank Righeimer

== Results ==
=== Round 1 ===
The top two teams in each pool advanced to the semifinals. Cuba and Hungary both withdrew, leaving their pools with only two entrants and resulting in no pool matches for those groups.

==== Pool 1 ====
Rank	Country	MW	ML	BW	BL	Notes
1	France	–	–	–	–	Q
1	Denmark	–	–	–	–	Q
–	Cuba	DNS	DNS	DNS	DNS	

==== Pool 2 ====
Rank	Country	MW	ML	BW	BL	Notes
1	United States	1	0	15	1	Q
2	Belgium	1	0	9	2	Q
3	Canada	0	2	3	24	

==== Pool 3 ====
Rank	Country	MW	ML	BW	BL	Notes
1	Italy	–	–	–	–	Q
1	Mexico	–	–	–	–	Q
–	Hungary	DNS	DNS	DNS	DNS	

=== Semifinals ===
The top two teams in each semifinal advanced to the final.

==== Semifinal 1 ====
Rank	Country	MW	ML	BW	BL	Notes
1	Italy	1	0	13	3	Q
2	Belgium	1	0	10.5	5.5	Q
3	Mexico	0	2	8.5	23.5	

==== Semifinal 2 ====
The match between the United States and Denmark was the only one actually contested. It ended in an 8–8 tie, broken by touches against at 28 for the United States to 33 for Denmark. Denmark then forfeited its match against France, which was scored 16–0.

Rank	Country	MW	ML	BW	BL	Notes
1	France	1	0	16	0	Q
2	United States	1	0	8	8	Q
3	Denmark	0	2	8	24	

=== Final ===
Rank	Country	MW	ML	BW	BL
1st place, gold medalist(s)	France	3	0	30.5	17.5
2nd place, silver medalist(s)	Italy	2	1	27.5	20.5
3rd place, bronze medalist(s)	United States	1	2	20.5	22.5
4	Belgium	0	3	12.5	30.5
