= Equestrian at the 1932 Summer Olympics – Team dressage =

Equestrian at the Olympics

Team dressage at the Games of the X Olympiad
- Venue: Riviera Country Club
- Date: 10 August 1932
- Competitors: 9 (3 teams) from 3 nations

Medalists
1st place, gold medalist(s)		André Jousseaume; Xavier Lesage; Charles Marion	France
2nd place, silver medalist(s)		Gustaf Boltenstern, Jr. Thomas Byström; Bertil Sandström	Sweden
3rd place, bronze medalist(s)		Isaac Kitts; Alvin Moore; Hiram Tuttle	United States

The team dressage in equestrian at the 1932 Olympic Games in Los Angeles was held at the Riviera Country Club in Pacific Palisades on 10 August.

== Competition format ==
The team and individual dressage competitions used the same results. Final standings were determined by adding the total points from each rider in the individual competition.

== Results ==
Rank	Name	Horse	Score	
Rank	Name	Horse	Individual	Team
1st place, gold medalist(s)	France; André Jousseaume; Xavier Lesage; Charles Marion	Sorelta; Taine; Linon	871.25; 1031.25; 916.25	2818.75
2nd place, silver medalist(s)	Sweden; Gustaf Boltenstern, Jr. Thomas Byström; Bertil Sandström	Ingo; Gulliver; Kreta	833.50; 880.50; 964.00	2678.00
3rd place, bronze medalist(s)	United States; Isaac Kitts; Alvin Moore; Hiram Tuttle	American Lady; Water Pat; Olympic	846.25; 829.00; 901.50	2576.75
