= Weightlifting at the 1932 Summer Olympics =

Weightlifting at the Games of the X Olympiad
- Weightlifting pictogram
- Venue: Olympic Auditorium
- Date: 30 July 2022
- No. of events: 5
- Competitors: 29 from 8 nations

The weightlifting events at the 1932 Summer Olympics in Los Angeles consisted of five weight classes. The competitions were held on Saturday, 30 July 1932 and on Sunday, 31 July 1932.

== Medal summary ==
Games	Gold	Silver	Bronze
60 kg	Raymond Suvigny; France	Hans Wölpert; Germany	Anthony Terlazzo; United States
67.5 kg	René Duverger; France	Hans Haas; Austria	Gastone Pierini; Italy
75 kg	Rudolf Ismayr; Germany	Carlo Galimberti; Italy	Karl Hipfinger; Austria
82.5 kg	Louis Hostin; France	Svend Olsen; Denmark	Henry Duey; United States
Over 82.5 kg	Jaroslav Skobla; Czechoslovakia	Václav Pšenička; Czechoslovakia	Josef Straßberger; Germany

== Participating nations ==
A total of 29 weightlifters from eight nations competed at the Los Angeles Games:

- Argentina (1)
- Austria (2)
- Czechoslovakia (2)
- Denmark (1)
- France (4)
- Germany (4)
- Italy (4)
- United States (10)

== Medal table ==
Rank	Nation	Gold	Silver	Bronze	Total
1	France	3	0	0	3
2	Germany	1	1	1	3
3	Czechoslovakia	1	1	0	2
4	Austria	0	1	1	2
4	Italy	0	1	1	2
6	Denmark	0	1	0	1
7	United States	0	0	2	2
Totals (7 entries)		5	5	5	15

== Sources ==
- "Olympic Medal Winners". International Olympic Committee.
