= Weightlifting at the 1932 Summer Olympics – Men's 82.5 kg =

Weightlifting at the Olympics

The men's light-heavyweight event was part of the weightlifting programme at the 1932 Summer Olympics in Los Angeles. The weight class was the second-heaviest contested, and allowed weightlifters of up to 82.5 kilograms (181.5 pounds). The competition was held on Saturday, 30 July 1932. Four weightlifters from three nations competed.

== Medalists ==
Gold	Silver	Bronze
Louis Hostin; France	Svend Olsen; Denmark	Henry Duey; United States

== Records ==
These were the standing world and Olympic records (in kilograms) prior to the 1932 Summer Olympics.

World Record	Press	>110.5	?		
World Record	Snatch	>117.5	?		
World Record	Clean & Jerk	>152.5	?		
World Record	Total	>372	?		
Olympic Record	Press	100	(Germany) Jakob Vogt	Amsterdam (NED)	29 July 1928
Olympic Record	Press	100	(Czechoslovakia) Václav Pšenička	Amsterdam (NED)	29 July 1928
Olympic Record	Press	100	(France) Louis Hostin	Amsterdam (NED)	29 July 1928
Olympic Record	Press	100	(Egypt) El Sayed Nosseir	Amsterdam (NED)	29 July 1928
Olympic Record	Snatch	112.5	(Egypt) El Sayed Nosseir	Amsterdam (NED)	29 July 1928
Olympic Record	Clean & Jerk	142.5	(Egypt) El Sayed Nosseir	Amsterdam (NED)	29 July 1928
Olympic Record	Clean & Jerk	142.5	(France) Louis Hostin	Amsterdam (NED)	29 July 1928
Olympic Record	Total	355	(Egypt) El Sayed Nosseir	Amsterdam (NED)	29 July 1928

Louis Hostin and Svend Olsen both improved the standing Olympic record in press with 102.5 kilograms. Louis Hostin also equalized the Olympic record in snatch with 112.5 kilograms and bettered the record in clean and jerk with 150 kilograms and in total with 365 kilograms.

== Results ==
All figures in kilograms.

Place	Weightlifter	Press			Snatch			Clean & jerk			Total
Place	Weightlifter	1.	2.	3.	1.	2.	3.	1.	2.	3.	Total
1	Louis Hostin (FRA)	97.5	X (102.5)	102.5	105	110	112.5	140	145	150	365
2	Svend Olsen (DEN)	95	100	102.5	102.5	107.5	X (132.5)	127.5	X (132.5)	132.5	340
3	Henry Duey (USA)	87.5	92.5	X (95)	95	100	105	127.5	X (132.5)	132.5	330
4	Bill Good (USA)	X (90)	X (95)	95	X (92.5)	92.5	97.5	X (130)	130	X (135)	322.5
