= List of Princeton University Olympians =

This is a list of Princeton University alumni who competed in the Olympic Games. In this list, the term athletics refers to track and field.

== Summer Olympians ==
1. Robert Garrett, class of 1897, men's athletics, 1896 Athens Olympics, 1900 Paris Olympics
2. Herbert Jamison, class of 1897, men's athletics, 1896 Athens Olympics
3. Francis Lane, class of 1897, men's athletics, 1896 Athens Olympics
4. Albert Tyler, class of 1897, men's athletics, 1896 Athens Olympics
5. John Cregan, class of 1900, men's athletics, 1900 Paris Olympics
6. Frank Jarvis, class of 1900, men's athletics, 1900 Paris Olympics
7. Daniel Horton, class of 1904, men's athletics, 1900 Paris Olympics
8. Charles Cresson, class of 1895, men's tennis, 1904 St. Louis Olympics
9. John DeWitt, class of 1904, men's athletics, 1904 St. Louis Olympics
10. John Eisele, class of 1906, men's athletics, 1908 London Olympics
11. William (Bill) Libbey, class of 1877, men's shooting, 1912 Stockholm Olympics
12. Rupert Thomas, class of 1913, men's athletics, 1912 Stockholm Olympics
13. Henry Breckenridge, class of 1907, men's fencing, 1920 Antwerp Olympics, 1928 Amsterdam Olympics
14. Karl Frederick, class of 1903, men's shooting, 1920 Antwerp Olympics
15. Leon Schoonmaker, class of 1904, men's fencing, 1920 Antwerp Olympics
16. Augus Frantz, class of 1916, men's wrestling, 1920 Antwerp Olympics
17. Ralph Hills, class of 1925, men's athletics, 1924 Paris Olympics
18. William Stevenson, class of 1922, men's athletics, 1924 Paris Olympics
19. John Coard Taylor, class of 1923, men's athletics, 1924 Paris Olympics
20. Jim Thompson, class of 1928, men's sailing, 1928 Amsterdam Olympics
21. Benjamin Hedges, class of 1930, men's athletics, 1928 Amsterdam Olympics
22. Horace Disston, class of 1928, men's field hockey, 1932 Los Angeles Olympics, 1936 Berlin Olympics
23. Samuel Ewing, class of 1927, men's field hockey, 1932 Los Angeles Olympics, 1936 Berlin Olympics
24. Warren Ingersoll, class of 1931, men's field hockey, 1932 Los Angeles Olympics
25. Tracy Jaeckel, class of 1928, men's fencing, 1932 Los Angeles Olympics, 1936 Berlin Olympics
26. David McMullin, class of 1930, men's field hockey, 1932 Los Angeles Olympics, 1936 Berlin Olympics
27. Edwin Moles, class of 1931, men's swimming, 1932 Los Angeles Olympics
28. Paul Fentress, class of 1936, men's field hockey, 1936 Berlin Olympics
29. Ellwood Godfrey, class of 1933, men's field hockey, 1936 Berlin Olympics
30. Al Vande Weghe, class of 1940, men's swimming, 1936 Berlin Olympics
31. Herman Whiton, class of 1926, men's sailing, 1948 London Olympics, 1952 Helsinki Olympics
32. Kinmont Hoitsma, class of 1956, men's fencing, 1956 Melbourne Olympics
33. Robert Stinson, class of 1955, men's sailing, 1956 Melbourne Olympics
34. Ferdinand (Andy) Schottle, class of 1955, men's sailing, 1956 Melbourne Olympics
35. Henry Kolowrat Jr., class of 1954, men's fencing, 1960 Rome Olympics
36. John Allis, class of 1965, men's cycling, 1964 Tokyo Olympics, 1968 Mexico City Olympics, 1972 Munich Olympics
37. Frank Anger, class of 1961, men's fencing, 1964 Tokyo Olympics
38. Bill Bradley, class of 1965, men's basketball, 1964 Tokyo Olympics
39. Seymour Cromwell, class 1956, men's rowing, 1964 Tokyo Olympics
40. Jed Graef, class of 1964, men's swimming, 1964 Tokyo Olympics
41. F. Gardner Cox, class of 1941, men's sailing, 1968 Mexico City Olympics
42. Doug Foy, class of 1969, men's rowing, 1968 Mexico City Olympics
43. Pete Raymond, class of 1968, men's rowing, 1968 Mexico City Olympics, 1972 Munich Olympics
44. Carl Van Duyne, class of 1968, men's sailing, 1968 Mexico City Olympics
45. Ross Wales, class of 1969, men's swimming, 1968 Mexico City Olympics
46. Thorsteinn Thorsteinsson Gislason, class of 1969, men's track and field, 1972 Munich Olympics
47. Raymond (Gary) Wright, class of 1970, men's rowing, 1968 Mexico City Olympics
48. Carol Brown, class of 1975, women's rowing, 1976 Montreal Olympics, 1984 Los Angeles Olympics
49. Mimi Kellogg, class of 1976, women's rowing, 1976 Montreal Olympics
50. Harold Backer, class of 1985, men's rowing, 1984 Los Angeles Olympics, 1988 Seoul Olympics, 1992 Barcelona Olympics
51. Christine Clark, class of 1976, women's rowing, 1984 Los Angeles Olympics
52. J. Michael Evans, class of 1980, men's rowing, 1984 Los Angeles Olympics
53. Ridgely Johnson, class of 1980, men's rowing, 1984 Los Angeles Olympics
54. Anne Marden, class of 1981, women's rowing, 1984 Los Angeles Olympics, 1988 Seoul Olympics, 1992 Barcelona Olympics
55. Chris Penny, class of 1985, men's rowing, 1984 Los Angeles Olympics
56. Lee Shelley, class of 1978, men's fencing, 1984 Los Angeles Olympics, 1988 Seoul Olympics
57. August Wolf, class of 1983, men's athletics, 1984 Los Angeles Olympics
58. Doug Burden, class of 1988, men's rowing, 1988 Seoul Olympics, 1992 Barcelona Olympics, 1996 Atlanta Olympics
59. Lynn Jennings, class of 1983, women's athletics, 1988 Seoul Olympics, 1992 Barcelona Olympics, 1996 Atlanta Olympics
60. Katy McCandless, class of 1992, women's athletics, 1996 Atlanta Olympics
61. Deborah St. Phard, class of 1987, women's athletics, 1988 Seoul Olympics
62. Dan Veatch, class of 1987, men's swimming, 1988 Seoul Olympics
63. Nelson Diebel, class of 1996, men's swimming, 1992 Barcelona Olympics
64. Dan Nowosielski, class of 1991, men's fencing, 1992 Barcelona Olympics, 1996 Atlanta Olympics
65. John Parker, class of 1989, men's rowing, 1992 Barcelona Olympics
66. Nathalie Wunderlich, class of 1993, women's swimming, 1992 Barcelona Olympics
67. Lianne Bennion Nelson, class of 1995, women's rowing, 1996 Atlanta Olympics, 2000 Sydney Olympics, 2004 Athens Olympics
68. Kevin Cotter, class of 1996, men's rowing, 1996 Atlanta Olympics, 2000 Sydney Olympics
69. Chris Ahrens, class of 1998, men's rowing, 2000 Sydney Olympics, 2004 Athens Olympics
70. Derek Bouchard-Hall, class of 1992, men's cycling, 2000 Sydney Olympics
71. Morgan Crooks, class of 1998, men's rowing, 2000 Sydney Olympics
72. Thomas Herschmiller, class of 2001, men's rowing, 2000 Sydney Olympics, 2004 Athens Olympics
73. Sean Kammann, class of 1998, men's rowing, 2000 Sydney Olympics
74. Paul Teti, class of 2001, men's rowing, 2000 Sydney Olympics, 2004 Athens Olympics, 2008 Beijing Olympics
75. Juan Pablo Valdivieso, class of 2004, men's swimming, 2000 Sydney Olympics, 2004 Athens Olympics
76. Tom Welsh, class of 1999, men's rowing, 2000 Sydney Olympics
77. Soren Thompson, class of 2005, men's fencing, 2004 Athens Olympics, 2012 London Olympics
78. Kamara James, class of 2008, women's fencing, 2004 Athens Olympics
79. Danika Holbrook, class of 1995, women's rowing, 2004 Athens Olympics
80. Andréanne Morin, class of 2006, women's rowing, 2004 Athens Olympics, 2008 Beijing Olympics, 2012 London Olympics
81. Tanya Kalyvas, class of 2001, women's soccer, 2004 Athens Olympics
82. Tora Harris, class of 2002, men's athletics, 2004 Athens Olympics
83. Steven Coppola, class of 2006, men's rowing, 2008 Beijing Olympics
84. Jesse Karmazin, class of 2007, para rowing, 2008 Beijing Olympics
85. Sandra Fong, class of 2013, women's shooting, 2008 Beijing Olympics
86. Doug Lennox, class of 2009, men's swimming, 2008 Beijing Olympics
87. Caroline Lind, class of 2006, women's rowing, 2008 Beijing Olympics, 2012 London Olympics
88. Sam Loch, class of 2006, men's rowing, 2008 Beijing Olympics, 2012 London Olympics
89. Diana Matheson, class of 2008, women's soccer, 2008 Beijing Olympics, 2012 London Olympics, 2016 Rio Olympics
90. Meredith Michaels-Beerbaum, class of 1992, women's equestrian, 2008 Beijing Olympics, 2012 London Olympics, 2016 Rio Olympics
91. Lia Pernell, class of 2003, women's rowing, 2008 Beijing Olympics
92. Bryan Tay, class of 2012, men's swimming, 2008 Beijing Olympics
93. Konrad Wysocki, class of 2004, men's basketball, 2008 Beijing Olympics
94. Donn Cabral, class of 2012, men's athletics, 2012 London Olympics, 2016 Rio Olympics
95. Sara Hendershot, class of 2010, women's rowing, 2012 London Olympics
96. Ariel Hsing, class of 2017, women's table tennis, 2012 London Olympics
97. Maya Lawrence, class of 2002, women's fencing, 2012 London Olympics
98. Glenn Ochal, class of 2008, men's rowing, 2012 London Olympics, 2016 Rio Olympics
99. Robin Prendes, class of 2011, men's rowing, 2012 London Olympics, 2016 Rio Olympics
100. Julia Reinprecht, class of 2014, women's field hockey, 2012 London Olympics, 2016 Rio Olympics
101. Katie Reinprecht, class of 2013, women's field hockey, 2012 London Olympics, 2016 Rio Olympics
102. Kathleen Sharkey, class of 2013, women's field hockey, 2016 Rio Olympics
103. Susie Scanlan, class of 2014, women's fencing, 2012 London Olympics
104. Genevra Stone, class of 2007, women's rowing, 2012 London Olympics, 2016 Rio Olympics
105. Lauren Wilkinson, class of 2011, women's rowing, 2012 London Olympics, 2016 Rio Olympics
106. Erica Wu, class of 2018, women's table tennis, 2012 London Olympics
107. Ashleigh Johnson, class of 2017, women's water polo, 2016 Rio Olympics, 2020 Tokyo Olympics, 2024 Paris Olympics
108. Kate Bertko, class of 2006, women’s rowing, 2016 Rio Olympics
109. Kathleen Sharkey, class of 2013, women's field hockey, 2016 Rio Olympics
110. Tyler Nase, class of 2013, men's rowing, 2016 Rio Olympics
111. Katharine Holmes, class of 2017, women's fencing, 2016 Rio Olympics, 2020 Tokyo Olympics
112. Mohamed Hamza, class of 2023, men's fencing, 2016 Rio Olympics, 2020 Tokyo Olympics

== Winter Olympians ==
1. Robert Livingston, class of 1931, men's ice hockey, 1932 Lake Placid Olympics
2. Fred Kammer, class of 1934, men's ice hockey, 1936 Garmisch-Partenkirchen Olympics
3. Malcolm McAlpin, class of 1932, men's ice hockey, 1936 Garmisch-Partenkirchen Olympics
4. Christopher R.P. Rodgers, class of 1942, men's ice hockey 1948 St. Moritz Olympics
5. James Sloane, class of 1943, men's ice hockey 1948 St. Moritz Olympics
6. Boris (Bob) Said, class of 1955, men's bobsled 1968 Grenoble Olympics, 1972 Sapporo Olympics
7. Mark Huck, class of 1979, men's speed skating 1984 Sarajevo Olympics
8. Andrea Kilbourne, class of 2002, women's ice hockey, 2002 Salt Lake City Olympics
9. Nikola Holmes, class of 2003, women's ice hockey, 2006 Turin Olympics
10. Joey Cheek, class of 2011, men's speed skating, 2002 Salt Lake City Olympics, 2006 Turin Olympics
11. Declan Farmer, class of 2020, para ice hockey, 2014 Sochi Paralympics, 2018 PyeongChang Paralympics
12. Caroline Park, class of 2011, women's ice hockey, 2018 Pyeongchang Olympics
13. Claire Thompson, class of 2020, women's ice hockey, 2022 Beijing Olympics
14. Sarah Fillier, class of 2024, women's ice hockey, 2022 Beijing Olympics
