= Wrestling at the 1932 Summer Olympics – Men's freestyle heavyweight =

Men's freestyle heavyweight at the Games of the X Olympiad
- Venue: Grand Olympic Auditorium
- Dates: 1–3 August 1932
- Competitors: 3 from 3 nations

Medalists
1st place, gold medalist(s)		Johan Richthoff	Sweden
2nd place, silver medalist(s)		Jack Riley	United States
3rd place, bronze medalist(s)		Nickolaus Hirschl	Austria

The men's freestyle heavyweight competition at the 1932 Summer Olympics in Los Angeles took place from 1 August to 3 August at the Grand Olympic Auditorium. Nations were limited to one competitor. This weight class was not limited by maximum weight and was open to wrestlers above 87kg.

This freestyle wrestling competition did not use the single-elimination bracket format previously used for Olympic freestyle wrestling but instead followed the format that was introduced at the 1928 Summer Olympics for Greco-Roman wrestling, using an elimination system based on the accumulation of points. Each round featured all wrestlers pairing off and wrestling one bout (with one wrestler having a bye if there were an odd number). The loser received 3 points. The winner received 1 point if the win was by decision and 0 points if the win was by fall. At the end of each round, any wrestler with at least 5 points was eliminated.

== Schedule ==
Date	Event
1 August 1932	Round 1
2 August 1932	Round 2
3 August 1932	Final round

== Results ==
=== Round 1 ===
With only three wrestlers, there could only be three total bouts over three rounds. In the first, Hirschl had a bye while Richthoff defeated Riley by decision. This left Hirschl with 0 points, Richthoff with 1, and Riley with 3.

Bouts

Winner	Nation	Victory Type	Loser	Nation
Johan Richthoff	Sweden	Decision	Jack Riley	United States
Nickolaus Hirschl	Austria	Bye	N/A	N/A

Points

Rank	Wrestler	Nation	Start	Earned	Total
1	Nickolaus Hirschl	Austria	0	0	0
2	Johan Richthoff	Sweden	0	1	1
3	Jack Riley	United States	0	3	3

=== Round 2 ===
In the second bout, Richthoff won again, this time over Hirschl. As the victory was by decision, Richthoff moved to 2 points; the other wrestlers finished the round with 3. Richthoff was assured of the gold medal after beating both the other wrestlers.

Bouts

Winner	Nation	Victory Type	Loser	Nation
Johan Richthoff	Sweden	Decision	Nickolaus Hirschl	Austria
Jack Riley	United States	Bye	N/A	N/A

Points

Rank	Wrestler	Nation	Start	Earned	Total
1st place, gold medalist(s)	Johan Richthoff	Sweden	1	1	2
2	Nickolaus Hirschl	Austria	0	3	3
2	Jack Riley	United States	3	0	3

=== Final round ===
The final round, pitting the two wrestlers who had lost to Richthoff against each other, was in effect a silver/bronze match. Riley won to take the silver.

Bouts

Winner	Nation	Victory Type	Loser	Nation
Jack Riley	United States	Fall	Nickolaus Hirschl	Austria

Points

Rank	Wrestler	Nation	Start	Earned	Total
2nd place, silver medalist(s)	Jack Riley	United States	3	0	3
3rd place, bronze medalist(s)	Nickolaus Hirschl	Austria	3	3	6
