= William Herrmann =

William Herrmann may refer to:

- William Herrmann (gymnast) (1912–2003), American gymnast
- Wilhelm Herrmann (1846–1922), Reformed German theologian
