= Hockey at the 1932 Olympics =

Hockey at the 1932 Olympics may refer to:

- Ice hockey at the 1932 Winter Olympics
- Field hockey at the 1932 Summer Olympics
