= Gurmit Singh Kullar =

Indian field hockey player (1907–1992)

Personal information
- Born: 1 January 1907 Sansarpur, Jalandhar, Punjab, British India
- Died: 4 February 1992 (aged 85) Punjab, India

Sport
- Sport: Field hockey
- Position: Right-in
National team
| Years | Team | Caps | Goals |
| 1932 | India | 2 | (8) |
Medal record
Men's Field Hockey
Representing India
Olympic Games
| Gold medal – first place | 1932 Los Angeles | Team competition |
- Updated on 17 August 2024

Gurmit Singh Kullar (1907 – 4 February 1992) was an Indian field hockey player who competed in the 1932 Summer Olympics.

== Early life and career ==
He was born in Sansarpur, Jalandhar, British India and died in Punjab, India. He studied at the Punjab Agricultural College, Lyallpur. He played for the Punjab University, Lahore from 1927 to 1932.

In 1932, he was a member of the Indian field hockey team, which won the gold medal at Los Angeles Olympics. He played two matches as forward and scored eight goals.
