= Wrestling at the 1932 Summer Olympics =

Wrestling at the Games of the X Olympiad
- Venue: Grand Olympic Auditorium
- Dates: August 1–7, 1932
- Competitors: 79 from 18 nations

Wrestling at the 1932 Summer Olympics was held between August 1–7 August at the Grand Olympic Auditorium. It was split into two disciplines, Freestyle and Greco-Roman which were further divided into different weight categories.

== Competition format ==
Wrestling events consisted of a series of matches and a system of points to decide elimination after each round, followed the format introduced for Greco-Roman wrestling at the 1928 Summer Olympics and now extended to freestyle competition as well. Matches were scored as follows: the results of the bouts were counted on points, with those having the least becoming the winners. Losers received 3 points for each bout lost, those who won by decision of the jury received 1 point, and those who won by pin received 0 points. Those competitors who accumulated 5 bad points were eliminated. If candidates for the third place were eliminated with equal bad points in the same round, they were paired, if they have not yet met each other, for the third place.

== Medal table ==
Rank	Nation	Gold	Silver	Bronze	Total
1	Sweden	6	1	3	10
2	United States	3	2	0	5
3	Finland	2	3	3	8
4	Germany	1	2	1	4
5	Italy	1	1	2	4
6	France	1	0	1	2
7	Hungary	0	2	1	3
8	Canada	0	1	0	1
8	Czechoslovakia	0	1	0	1
8	Denmark	0	1	0	1
11	Austria	0	0	2	2
12	Australia	0	0	1	1
Totals (12 entries)		14	14	14	42

== Medal summary ==
=== Greco-Roman ===
Games	Gold	Silver	Bronze
Bantamweight	Jakob Brendel; Germany	Marcello Nizzola; Italy	Louis François; France
Featherweight	Giovanni Gozzi; Italy	Wolfgang Ehrl; Germany	Lauri Koskela; Finland
Lightweight	Erik Malmberg; Sweden	Abraham Kurland; Denmark	Eduard Sperling; Germany
Welterweight	Ivar Johansson; Sweden	Väinö Kajander; Finland	Ercole Gallegati; Italy
Middleweight	Väinö Kokkinen; Finland	Jean Földeák; Germany	Axel Cadier; Sweden
Light Heavyweight	Rudolf Svensson; Sweden	Onni Pellinen; Finland	Mario Gruppioni; Italy
Heavyweight	Carl Westergren; Sweden	Josef Urban; Czechoslovakia	Nickolaus Hirschl; Austria

=== Freestyle ===
Games	Gold	Silver	Bronze
Bantamweight	Robert Pearce; United States	Ödön Zombori; Hungary	Aatos Jaskari; Finland
Featherweight	Hermanni Pihlajamäki; Finland	Edgar Nemir; United States	Einar Karlsson; Sweden
Lightweight	Charles Pacôme; France	Károly Kárpáti; Hungary	Gustaf Klarén; Sweden
Welterweight	Jack van Bebber; United States	Daniel MacDonald; Canada	Eino Leino; Finland
Middleweight	Ivar Johansson; Sweden	Kyösti Luukko; Finland	József Tunyogi; Hungary
Light Heavyweight	Peter Mehringer; United States	Thure Sjöstedt; Sweden	Eddie Scarf; Australia
Heavyweight	Johan Richthoff; Sweden	Jack Riley; United States	Nickolaus Hirschl; Austria

== Participating nations ==
18 nations participated in Wrestling at the 1932 Olympics:

- Australia (1)
- Austria (1)
- Canada (6)
- Czechoslovakia (2)
- Denmark (3)
- Estonia (1)
- Finland (10)
- France (5)
- Germany (5)
- Great Britain (2)
- Greece (2)
- Hungary (5)
- Italy (6)
- Japan (7)
- Mexico (2)
- Norway (1)
- Sweden (13)
- United States (7)
