= Ethel Harrington =

American sprinter

Ethel Harrington (born June 18, 1907, in Winnipeg, Manitoba, Canada) was an American track and field sprinter. She ran the 100 meters for the United States at the 1932 Summer Olympics. She died November 23, 1972, in Miami, Florida, United States.
