= Akio Sohda =

Japanese field hockey player

Personal information
- Born: April 10, 1909 Dalian, China
Medal record
Men's field hockey
Representing Japan
Olympic Games
Silver medal – second place	1932 Los Angeles	Team competition

Akio Sohda (左右田 秋雄, Sōda Akio; born April 10, 1909, date of death unknown) was a Japanese field hockey player who competed in the 1932 Summer Olympics. He was born in Dalian, China. In 1932 he was a member of the Japanese field hockey team, which won the silver medal. He played two matches as back.
