= Austria at the 1932 Summer Olympics =

- IOC code: AUT
- NOC: Austrian Olympic Committee

in Los Angeles
- Competitors: 19 in 7 sports
- Medals Ranked 18th: Gold 1 Silver 1 Bronze 3 Total 5

Summer Olympics appearances (overview)
- 1896; 1900; 1904; 1908; 1912; 1920; 1924; 1928; 1932; 1936; 1948; 1952; 1956; 1960; 1964; 1968; 1972; 1976; 1980; 1984; 1988; 1992; 1996; 2000; 2004; 2008; 2012; 2016; 2020; 2024

Other related appearances
- 1906 Intercalated Games

Austria competed at the 1932 Summer Olympics in Los Angeles, United States. The team ranked eighteenth overall and attained 5 medals. 19 competitors, 17 men and 2 women, took part in 14 events in 7 sports.

== Medalists ==
Medal	Name	Sport	Event
Gold	Ellen Preis	Fencing	Women's Individual Foil
Silver	Hans Haas	Weightlifting	Men's Lightweight
Bronze	Karl Hipfinger	Weightlifting	Men's Middleweight
Bronze	Nickolaus Hirschl	Wrestling	Men's Greco-Roman heavyweight
Bronze	Nickolaus Hirschl	Wrestling	Men's freestyle heavyweight

== Diving ==
Men

Athlete	Event	Final	
Athlete	Event	Points	Rank
Josef Staudinger	3 m springboard	124.50	9
Josef Staudinger	10 m platform	103.44	4

Women

Athlete	Event	Final	
Athlete	Event	Points	Rank
Magdalene Epply	3 m springboard	63.70	6
Magdalene Epply	10 m platform	26.76	7

== Fencing ==
One fencer, Ellen Müller-Preis, represented Austria at the 1932 Summer Olympics. She won gold in the women's foil event.

Women's foil

- Ellen Müller-Preis

== Sailing ==
Open

Athlete	Event	Race											Net points	Final rank
Athlete	Event	1	2	3	4	5	6	7	8	9	10	11	Net points	Final rank
Hans Riedl	Snowbird	9	4	10	9	9	7	9	10	3	8	10	44	10
