= Gymnastics at the 1932 Summer Olympics – Men's tumbling =

The men's tumbling event was part of the gymnastics program at the 1932 Summer Olympics. It was contested for the only time at the Olympics. The competition was held on Wednesday, August 10, 1932. Four gymnasts from two nations competed.

== Medalists ==
Gold	Silver	Bronze
Rowland Wolfe; United States	Ed Gross; United States	William Herrmann; United States

== Results ==
Two exercises were contested with the results based on total points.

Place	Gymnast	Total	1st ex.	2nd ex.
1	Rowland Wolfe (USA)	56.7	28.3	28.4
2	Ed Gross (USA)	56.0	27.6	28.4
3	William Herrmann (USA)	55.1	26.6	28.5
4	István Pelle (HUN)	46.3	25.4	20.9
