= David McMullin =

American field hockey player

Olympic medal record

Men's field hockey
Bronze medal – third place	1932 Los Angeles	Team competition

David E. McMullin III (June 30, 1908 – September 15, 1995) was an American field hockey player who competed in the 1932 Summer Olympics and 1936 Summer Olympics, and a champion squash player. He went on to become a senior vice president at Wanamaker's in Philadelphia, Pennsylvania.

== Early life and education ==
McMullin was born in Gwynedd Valley, Pennsylvania. He attended the Episcopal Academy in Newtown Square, and graduated from Princeton University in 1930.

== Sports career ==
In 1932, McMullin was a member of the American field hockey team, which won the bronze medal. He played two matches as forward. Four years later he was a member of the American field hockey team, which lost all three matches in the preliminary round and did not advance.

In 1947, McMullin won the United States National Doubles Squash Racquets Championship, as well as the Canadian National Doubles Squash Racquets Championship. In 1948, he won the Dominion squash doubles title with John Fetcher, whom he had never paired with prior to that year's meet.

McMullin was also a golfer and former president of the Gulph Mills Golf Club. He had four hole-in-ones.

== Personal life ==
Dave McMullin was married to his wife Anita McMullin (née Brooke) for 62 years. They had two sons and five grandchildren, and at least one great-grandchild. He died in Newtown Square, Pennsylvania.

== See also ==
- List of Princeton University Olympians
