= Horace Disston =

American field hockey player

Olympic medal record

Men's field hockey
| Bronze medal – third place | 1932 Los Angeles | Team competition |

Horace Cumberland Disston (January 7, 1906 – September 30, 1982) was an American field hockey player who competed in the 1932 Summer Olympics and 1936 Summer Olympics.

He was born in Philadelphia, Pennsylvania and died in Camden, Maine.

In 1932 he was a member of the American field hockey team, which won the bronze medal. He played two matches as halfback.

Four years later he was a member of the American field hockey team, which lost all three matches in the preliminary round and did not advance. He played three matches as halfback.

== See also ==
- List of Princeton University Olympians
