= Ed Gross =

American gymnast (1916–1985)

- Full name: Edwin T. Gross
- Born: September 19, 1916
- Died: June 29, 1985 (aged 68) Seattle, Washington, U.S.

Gymnastics career
- Discipline: Men's artistic gymnastics
- Country represented: United States
- Gym: Los Angeles Athletic Club
Medal record
Men's artistic gymnastics
Representing United States
| Event | 1st | 2nd | 3rd |
|---|---|---|---|
| Olympic Games | 0 | 1 | 0 |
| Total | 0 | 1 | 0 |
Olympic Games
| Silver medal – second place | 1932 Los Angeles | Tumbling |

Edwin T. Gross (September 19, 1916 – January 14, 1985) was an American gymnast and Olympic medalist. He was a member of the United States men's national artistic gymnastics team and competed at the 1932 Summer Olympics in Los Angeles where he received a silver medal in tumbling.

As a gymnast, Gross was a member of the Los Angeles Athletic Club.

Gross died in Seattle, Washington.
