= Xavier Lesage =

French equestrian

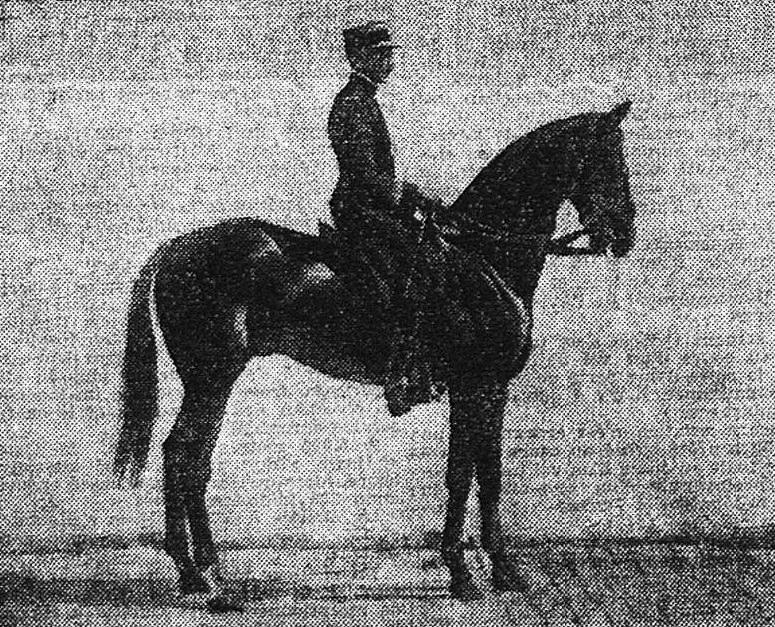
- Xavier Lesage on Taine, in April 1933.

Medal record

Men's equestrian

Representing France
Gold medal – first place	1932 Los Angeles	Individual dressage
Gold medal – first place	1932 Los Angeles	Team dressage
Bronze medal – third place	1924 Paris	Individual dressage

François Xavier Edmond Marie Lesage (25 October 1885 – 3 August 1968) was a French horse rider who competed in the 1924 Summer Olympics and in the 1932 Summer Olympics. He was born in Moret-sur-Loing and died in Gisors.

== Biography ==
Xavier Lesage was Colonel in the French Military, also decorated with the Légion d'honneur.

In 1924 he and his horse Plumard won the bronze medal in the individual dressage competition in the Olympics. Eight years later he and his horse Taine won the gold medal in the individual dressage as well as in the team dressage.

He was also the commander of the black squadron Cadre Noir of Saumur, which earned him the title "Grand Dieu".
