= Amos Deacon =

American field hockey player

Olympic medal record

Men's field hockey
Bronze medal – third place	1932 Los Angeles	Team competition

Amos R. Little Deacon (May 28, 1904 – October 9, 1982) was an American field hockey player who competed in the 1932 Summer Olympics and 1936 Summer Olympics.

He was born in Philadelphia, Pennsylvania and died in Santa Barbara, California.

In 1932 he was a member of the American field hockey team, which won the bronze medal. He played two matches as forward.

Four years later he was a member of the American field hockey team, which lost all three matches in the preliminary round and did not advance. He played two matches as forward.
