= Harold Brewster =

American field hockey player (1903–1994)

Olympic medal record

Men's field hockey
Bronze medal – third place	1932 Los Angeles	Team competition

Harold Suydam Brewster (May 2, 1903 – September 3, 1994) was an American field hockey player who competed in the 1932 Summer Olympics when the United States men's team won the bronze medal.

He played as a goalkeeper and made many stops in the 1932 U.S. match against India, but his team ultimately lost 24–1.

He was born in Lakewood, New Jersey.
