= Charles Sheaffer =

American field hockey player

Olympic medal record

Men's field hockey
Bronze medal – third place	1932 Los Angeles	Team competition

Charles Miller Sheaffer, Jr. (December 6, 1904 – August 28, 1989), also known as "Juney" Sheaffer, was an American field hockey player who played in the position of forward. He competed in the 1932 Summer Olympics and 1936 Summer Olympics, and was a member of the United States field hockey team that won the bronze medal in Los Angeles in 1932. A native of Pennsylvania, he was one of eight players from the Quakers field hockey club which played at the Philadelphia cricket club, to be selected for the 1932 US line-up.

== Early life and education ==
Sheaffer was born in St. Davids, Pennsylvania, and was a graduate of the University of Pennsylvania.

== Athletic career ==
In 1932, Sheaffer was a member of the United States field hockey team, which won the bronze medal at the Los Angeles Olympics. He played two matches, playing right inside against Japan. During the match against India, Sheaffer suffered an eye injury.

Four years later, he was a member of the United States field hockey team, which lost all three matches in the preliminary round of the 1936 tournament and did not advance.

== Personal life and death ==
Sheaffer became an insurance executive. He was a vice president at Marsh McLennan and retired in 1974. He died in Bryn Mawr, Pennsylvania, in 1989.
