= James Gentle =

American soccer player

Personal information
- Full name: James Cuthbert Gentle
- Date of birth: July 21, 1904
- Place of birth: Brookline, Massachusetts, United States
- Date of death: May 22, 1986 (aged 81)
- Place of death: Philadelphia, Pennsylvania, United States
- Position: Inside forward

Youth career
- 1923–1926: University of Pennsylvania

Senior career*
Years	Team	Apps	(Gls)
1925–1926	Boston Soccer Club	1	(0)
1926–	Philadelphia Field Club		

International career
1934	United States	1	(0)

Managerial career
- 1935–1940: Haverford Fords
Medal record
Men's soccer
Representing United States
FIFA World Cup
Third place	1930 Uruguay
Men's Field Hockey
Bronze medal – third place	1932 Los Angeles	Team
- * Club domestic league appearances and goals

James Cuthbert Gentle (July 21, 1904 – May 22, 1986) was an American soccer striker, field hockey player, soldier, and golfer. He is a member of the National Soccer Hall of Fame.

== Youth ==
Born outside Boston in Brookline, Massachusetts, Gentle grew up in his hometown, attended Brookline High School. In 1922, he entered the University of Pennsylvania where he played football as a freshman. He switched to soccer and track for his next three years at Penn, earning first team All American honors for soccer in 1924 and 1925. Gentle graduated from the university's Wharton School with a bachelor's degree in economics in 1926. Active in student government, Gentle was his class president and a member of the Mask and Wig and Varsity Club.

== Soccer ==
=== Player ===
During his time at Penn, Gentle played one game, as an amateur, with the professional Boston Soccer Club of the American Soccer League. Following his graduation, Gentle signed with the Philadelphia Field Club. In 1930, Gentle was called into the U.S. national team for the 1930 World Cup. Besides his duties as a striker, Gentle also acted as an interpreter for the American team and officials as he was the only person fluent in Spanish.

=== Coach ===
In 1935, Haverford College hired Gentle to coach its men's soccer team. Over six seasons, Gentle took Haverford to a 39-26-3 record and two Mid-American Conference titles.

In 1986, Gentle was inducted into the National Soccer Hall of Fame.

== Army ==
Gentle joined the Army Reserves in 1931. When the U.S. entered World War II Gentle was assigned to the 36th Infantry regiment. His unit was deployed to the European Theater where it fought at Salerno, the mountains behind Monte Cassino. Another battle was fought at the Gari River in Italy. Finally he joined General Patton's forces as they moved across Europe and into the Rhineland. At the end of the war, Gentle, now a major, was named U.S. trade and industry officer for the American zone of Germany. He retired from the Army in 1956 in the rank of colonel.

== Other sports ==
Gentle was a member of the U.S. field hockey team which earned a bronze medal during Olympic Games of 1932 in Los Angeles.

Later in life, Gentle became interested in golf and became a member of the International Team of the American Senior Golf Association. He died in 1986 in Philadelphia.

== Insurance industry ==
In 1931, in addition to joining Army Reserves, Gentle as began working at Mutual Life Insurance Company. In addition to his military duties and athletic interests, Gentle continued to work full-time in the insurance industry
