= Gabriel Gracida =

Mexican equestrian

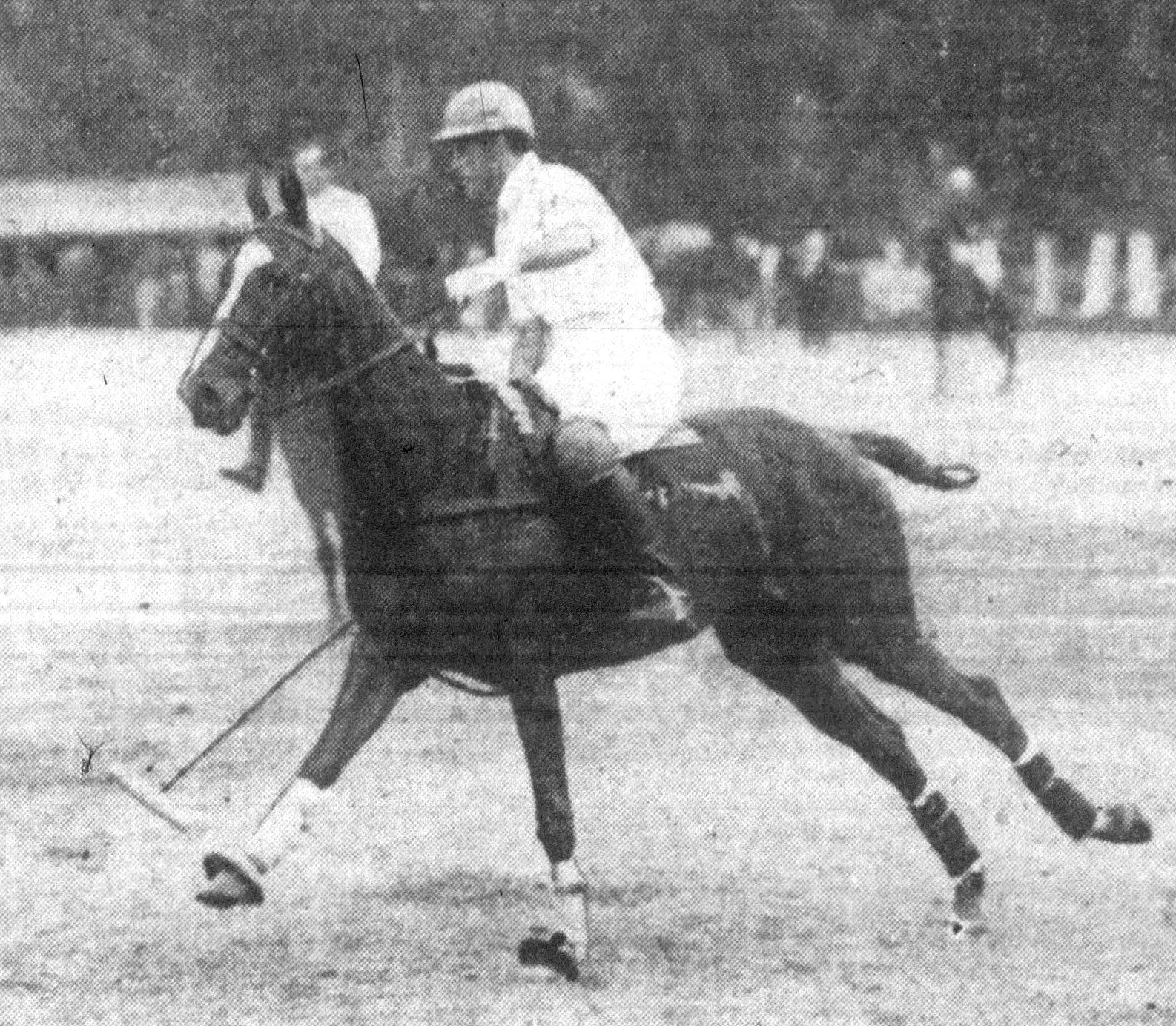
- Gracida, circa 1950

Personal information
- Nationality: Mexican
- Born: 1 May 1900

Sport
- Sport: Equestrian

Gabriel Gracida (born 1 May 1900, date of death unknown) was a Mexican equestrian. He competed at the 1928 Summer Olympics and the 1948 Summer Olympics.
