= Roy Coffin =

American field hockey player

Olympic medal record

Men's field hockey
Bronze medal – third place	1932 Los Angeles	Team competition

Roy Riddell Coffin (May 10, 1898 – November 10, 1982) was an American field hockey player who competed in the 1932 Summer Olympics.

In 1932 he was a member of the American field hockey team, which won the bronze medal. He played one match as back.

He was born in Philadelphia, Pennsylvania and died in Wallingford, Pennsylvania.
