= Henry Greer (field hockey) =

American field hockey player

Olympic medal record

Men's field hockey
| Bronze medal – third place | 1932 Los Angeles | Team competition |

Henry Kirk Greer (October 11, 1899 – July 20, 1978) was an American field hockey player who competed in the 1932 Summer Olympics.

In 1932 he was a member of the American field hockey team, which won the bronze medal. He played two matches as halfback.

He was born in North Adams, Massachusetts and died in Dennis, Massachusetts. He graduated from Williams College and Harvard Law School.
