= Field hockey at the 1932 Summer Olympics =

Field hockey at the Games of the X Olympiad
- Venue: Los Angeles Memorial Coliseum
- Dates: 4–11 August 1932
- Teams: 3

Medalists
1st place, gold medalist(s)		India
2nd place, silver medalist(s)		Japan
3rd place, bronze medalist(s)		United States

The field hockey tournament at the 1932 Summer Olympics was the fourth edition of the field hockey event at the Summer Olympic Games.

== Medal summary ==
Gold	Silver	Bronze
India; Richard Allen; Muhammad Aslam; Lal Shah Bokhari (Captain); Frank Brewin; Richard Carr; Dhyan Chand; Leslie Hammond; Arthur Hind; Sayed Jaffar; Masud Minhas; Broome Pinniger; Gurmit Singh Kullar; Roop Singh; William Sullivan; Carlyle Tapsell	Japan; Shunkichi Hamada; Junzo Inohara; Sadayoshi Kobayashi; Haruhiko Kon; Kenichi Konishi; Hiroshi Nagata; Eiichi Nakamura; Yoshio Sakai; Katsumi Shibata; Akio Sohda; Toshio Usami	United States; William Boddington; Harold Brewster; Roy Coffin; Amos Deacon; Horace Disston; Samuel Ewing; James Gentle; Henry Greer; Lawrence Knapp; David McMullin; Leonard O'Brien; Charles Sheaffer; Frederick Wolters; Warren Ingersoll

== Results ==
=== Standings ===
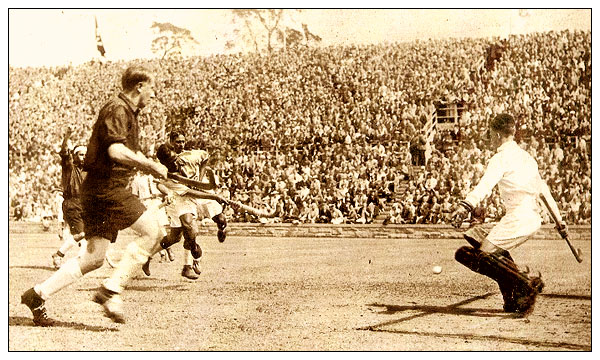
Match of India against the United States

Pos	Team	Pld	W	D	L	GF	GA	GD	Pts
1st place, gold medalist(s)	India	2	2	0	0	35	2	+33	2
2nd place, silver medalist(s)	Japan	2	1	0	1	10	13	−3	1
3rd place, bronze medalist(s)	United States (H)	2	0	0	2	3	33	−30	0

Source: Sports Reference
(H) Hosts

=== Matches ===
4 August 1932
10:00

India	11–1	Japan
Roop Singh 5', ?', ?'; Carr ?'; Kullar 37', ?', 65'; Chand 38', ?', ?', ?'	Report	Inohara ?'

Umpires:
T. Hinoshe (JPN)
Charles Newham (GBR)

8 August 1932
14:30

Japan	9–2	United States
Konishi 6', ?'; Inohara ?', 34', ?', ?'; Nagata ?', ?', ?'	Report	McMullin ?'; Sheaffer ?'

Umpires:
Charles Newham (GBR)
Pankaj Gupta (IND)

11 August 1932
14:30

India	24–1	United States
Chand ?', ?', ?', ?', ?', ?', ?', ?'; Roop Singh ?', ?', ?', ?', ?', ?', ?', ?', ?', ?'; Kullar ?', ?', ?', ?', ?'; Pinniger ?'	Report	Boddington ?'

Umpires:
Tom Spence (GBR)
Charles Newham (GBR)
