= Leonard O'Brien =

American field hockey player

Olympic medal record

Men's field hockey
Bronze medal – third place	1932 Los Angeles	Team competition

Leonard Francis "Mike" O'Brien (January 20, 1904 – March 30, 1939) was an American field hockey player who won the team bronze in the 1932 Summer Olympics, and was a player-manager during the 1936 Summer Olympics. He went on to become an investment broker in Boston.

== Early life and education ==
Born in North Adams, Massachusetts, he attended Drury High School where he was captain of the baseball team in 1920. After graduating, he went to Williams College, where he continued to play baseball and was captain during his final season in 1925. He had missed an entire year of school due to typhoid fever.

== Athletic career ==
In 1932, O'Brien was a member of the United States men's field hockey team, which won the bronze medal.

In 1934, he was appointed to the American Olympic committee, in recognition of the role he played as secretary and treasurer of the Field Hockey Association of America.

In 1936, he was a member of the American field hockey team, which lost all three matches in the preliminary round and did not advance.

== Personal life and death ==
O'Brien was in an automobile accident and was reported missing on March 30, 1939. His body was found in the Charles River in Boston, Massachusetts over a month later.
