= Rowland Wolfe =

American artistic gymnast

- Full name: Merrill Rowland Wolfe
- Born: October 8, 1914 Dallas, Texas, U.S.
- Died: January 14, 2010 (aged 95) Conroe, Texas, U.S.

Gymnastics career
- Discipline: Men's artistic gymnastics
- Country represented: United States
- College team: Western Reserve
- Gym: Dallas Athletic Club
Medal record
Men's artistic gymnastics
Representing United States
Event	1st	2nd	3rd
Olympic Games	1	0	0
Total	1	0	0
Olympic Games
Gold medal – first place	1932 Los Angeles	Tumbling

Merrill Rowland Wolfe (October 8, 1914 – January 14, 2010) was an American gymnast and Olympic champion. He was a member of the United States men's national artistic gymnastics team and competed at the 1932 Summer Olympics in Los Angeles where he received a gold medal in tumbling.

== Life ==
Wolfe graduated from Woodrow Wilson High School in Dallas, Texas, in 1934. He was inducted into the school's Hall of Fame in 1989, the same year the Hall of Fame was created in celebration of the school's 60th Anniversary.

As a gymnast, Wolfe was a member of the Dallas Athletic Club.

In 1938, Wolfe received a Bachelor of Arts in biology from Western Reserve University (now Case Western Reserve University). During his time as a student there, he was a member of the Delta Upsilon fraternity, the swimming team, and the gymnastics team - serving as both captain and coach.

Wolfe died on January 14, 2010, in Kerrville, Texas, aged 95.
