= Jean Piot =

French fencer (1890–1961)

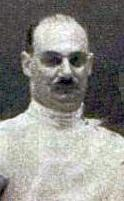
- Piot in 1932

Personal information
- Born: 10 May 1890 Saint-Quentin, Aisne, France
- Died: 15 December 1961 (aged 71) La Sauvetat, Puy-de-Dôme, France

Sport
- Sport: Fencing
Medal record
Men's fencing
Representing France
Olympic Games
Gold medal – first place	1932 Los Angeles	Team foil
Gold medal – first place	1932 Los Angeles	Team épée

Jean Piot (10 May 1890 – 15 December 1961) was a French fencer. He won two gold medals at the 1932 Summer Olympics.
