= Frederick Wolters =

American field hockey player

Olympic medal record

Men's field hockey
Bronze medal – third place	1932 Los Angeles	Team competition

Frederick Augustus Wolters (June 14, 1904 – December 29, 1990) was an American field hockey player who was a member of the team which won the bronze medal at the 1932 Summer Olympics. He played one match as back.

He was born in San Francisco, California and died in San Leandro, California.
