= Fernand Jourdant =

French fencer (1903–1956)

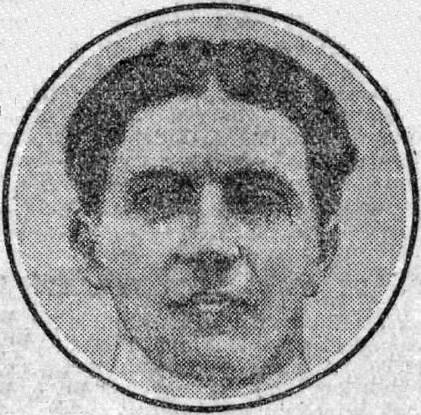
- Jourdant in 1927

Personal information
- Born: 3 February 1903 Flers, Orne, France
- Died: 2 January 1956 (aged 52)

Sport
- Sport: Fencing
Medal record
Men's fencing
Representing France
Olympic Games
Gold medal – first place	1932 Los Angeles	Team épée

Fernand Jourdant (3 February 1903 – 2 January 1956) was a French fencer. He won a gold medal in the team épée event at the 1932 Summer Olympics.
