= Lawrence Knapp =

American field hockey player

Olympic medal record

Men's field hockey
Bronze medal – third place	1932 Los Angeles	Team competition

Laurence A. Knapp (May 30, 1905 – November 8, 1976) was an American field hockey player who competed in the 1932 Summer Olympics and 1936 Berlin, Germany.

In 1932, he was a member of the American field hockey team, and 4 years later he was a member of the American field hockey team.

== Early life and education ==
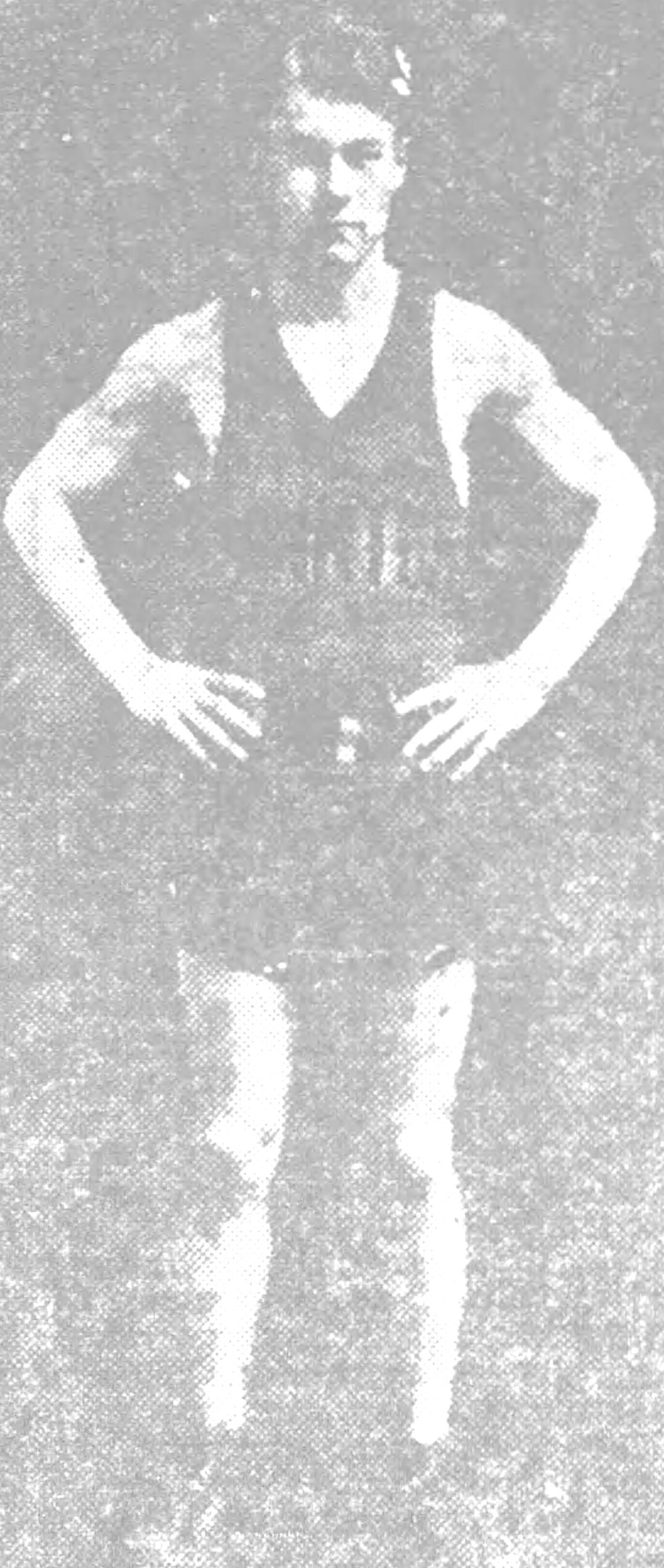
Lawrence Knapp as a college athlete in 1925

Kanpp was born in Garden City, South Dakota as Laury Knapp. He was the son of Clarence A. Knapp and his wife. He had a brother named Edward and a sister named Dorothy.

Knapp attended Yankton College in Yankton, South Dakota, where he was a member of the Yankton Greyhounds basketball team. He served as captain of the team for the 1924 season. He also played for the gridiron football team as a quarterback, and competed in track and field through the relay race and pole vault. He began serving as athletic manager of the college's students' association in 1923, and was elected its president the following year. In 1924, he was elected treasurer of the Order of DeMolay chapter at Yankton.

In 1927, Knapp was a law student at George Washington University in Washington, D.C. By 1932, he had moved to New York City and was working in a law firm.

== Sports career ==
In July 1932, Knapp was announced as a member of the United States men's national field hockey team for the 1932 Summer Olympics.

== Personal life ==
On August 2, 1941, Knapp married Kortryc Collier Stephen, who was originally from Cardiff in Wales. He died in Washington, D. C..
