= William Boddington =

American field hockey player (1910–1996)

Olympic medal record

Men's field hockey
Bronze medal – third place	1932 Los Angeles	Team competition

William Westcott Boddington (November 22, 1910 – November 15, 1996) was an American field hockey player who competed in the 1932 Summer Olympics and 1936 Summer Olympics.

== Early life and education ==
Boddington was born in Jersey City, New Jersey.

== Sports career ==
In 1932 Boddington was a member of the American field hockey team, which won the bronze medal. He played two matches as forward. His goal for the United States in the closing minutes of the first half was only the second goal given up by India in two matches at the Olympics.

Four years later he was a member of the American field hockey team, which lost all three matches in the preliminary round in the 1936 Summer Olympics in Berlin, Germany and did not advance. He played three matches as forward. Adolf Hitler signed his visa. Following World War II, Boddington continued his love of sports by coaching soccer at Colorado College. In 1990, he was recognized as the "Father" of Colorado College soccer. In 1995, he was among the first group of athletes to be inducted into the Colorado College Athletic Hall of Fame.

== Professional career and military service ==
Boddington served in the United States Army from 1941 to 1945. He joined the 10th Mountain Division in 1942 and remained with the Division until 1945. During the Division's training at Camp Hale, Colorado, he commanded A of the 86th Regiment. The United States Army awarded him the Bronze Star for his valor while serving with the 10th Mountain Division in the Italian Campaign.

Boddington's passion for the 10th Mountain Division continued throughout his life. As one of the founders of the Tenth Mountain Division Foundation, he served as President and President Emeritus. He also dedicated time to community service. He was trustee of the Colorado Springs School and a trustee of the Colorado Springs School Foundation. He also served as a Trustee of the 10th Mountain Division Trail Hut System. He served on the board of the Colorado Opera Festival and was an early founder of the SOXY program in Colorado Springs. In 1987, he was the honoree of the Mountain States Retail Lumber Association, of which only 14 other men have received a Life Membership by this Association.

Before his death, he built a successful career in the lumber industry in Colorado Springs, Colorado.

== Personal life ==
He died in Colorado Springs, Colorado on November 15, 1996, and was survived by his sons, John and Tim.
