= Jack Riley (American football) =

American football player (1909–1993)

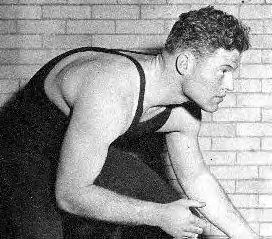
- Jack Riley as a wrestler at Northwestern University

Profile
- Position: Tackle

Personal information
- Born: June 13, 1909; Chicago, Illinois, U.S.
- Died: March 22, 1993 (aged 83); Kenilworth, Illinois, U.S.
- Listed height: 6 ft 2 in (1.88 m)
- Listed weight: 218 lb (99 kg)

Career information
- College: Northwestern

Career history
- Boston Redskins (1933)

Awards and highlights
- Consensus All-American (1931); First-team All-Big Ten (1931); Second-team All-Big Ten (1929)
- Stats at Pro Football Reference
- College Football Hall of Fame

Medal record

Men's freestyle wrestling

Representing the United States

Olympic Games
Silver medal – second place	1932 Los Angeles	Heavyweight

Collegiate Wrestling

Representing Northwestern Wildcats

NCAA Championships
Gold medal – first place	1931 Providence	Heavyweight
Gold medal – first place	1932 Bloomington	Heavyweight

John Horn Riley (June 13, 1909 – March 22, 1993) was an American football tackle. He played college football at Northwestern University and professionally in the National Football League (NFL) for the Boston Redskins. Riley was inducted into the College Football Hall of Fame in 1988. He was also a two-time NCAA wrestling national champion at Northwestern and silver medalist in freestyle wrestling at the 1932 Summer Olympics.

== Early life ==
Riley was born in Chicago and attended New Trier High School in Winnetka, Illinois, as well as St. John's Northwestern Military Academy in Delafield, Wisconsin. While at St. Johns, he participated in rowing and captained a championship crew in 1927.

== College career ==
Riley attended and played college football at Northwestern University. While he was there, Northwestern had a 20–5–1 record and won two Big Ten Conference championships. He was named an All-American in 1931.

Riley also wrestled at Northwestern and was the NCAA heavyweight champion in 1931 and 1932. He then won a silver medal in wrestling at the 1932 Summer Olympics, behind Swede Johan Richthoff and ahead of Austrian Nickolaus Hirschl.

== Professional career ==
After college, Riley played professional football in the National Football League for the Boston Redskins (later Washington Redskins now Washington Football Team) in 1933.

After football, Riley became a professional wrestler for two years and retired undefeated after 132 professional matches.

== Post-sports ==
Riley entered the United States Marine Corps during World War II and rose to the rank of major. After the war he worked as a manufacturer's representative in Kenilworth, Illinois. Also, from 1948 to 1957, Riley served as the Northwestern University wrestling coach.
