= Frank Connell =

American cyclist

Personal information
- Born: October 19, 1909 Hoboken, New Jersey, United States
- Died: July 25, 2002 (aged 92) Columbia, South Carolina, United States

Cycling career
- Sport: Cycling

Frank Connell (October 19, 1909 – July 25, 2002) was an American cyclist. He competed in the individual and team road race events at the 1932 Summer Olympics.
