= Samuel Ewing =

American field hockey player

Olympic medal record

Men's field hockey
Bronze medal – third place	1932 Los Angeles	Team competition

Samuel Evans Ewing, Jr. (July 27, 1906 – April 6, 1981) was an American lawyer who competed on the United States men's field hockey team in the 1932 Summer Olympics and 1936 Summer Olympics, winning a bronze medal in Los Angeles in 1932. After serving in the United States Army during World War II, he joined the legal department at RCA where he remained for 25 years, serving as general counsel, vice president for manufacturing and service, and director of government relations. Influential in Pennsylvania politics, he held several posts within the state Republican Party, including finance chairman and campaign chairman when William Scranton ran for governor.

== Early life and education ==
Ewing grew up in Bryn Mawr, Pennsylvania.

== Athletic career ==
In 1932 he was a member of the American field hockey team, which won the bronze medal. He played one match as back.

Four years later he was a member of the American field hockey team, which lost all three matches in the preliminary round and did not advance. He played two matches as back.

== Personal life and death ==
Ewing died in Delray Beach, Florida.

== See also ==
- List of Princeton University Olympians
