= Bernard Schmetz =

French fencer (1904–1966)

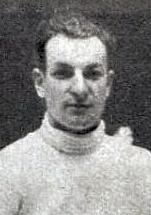
- Schmetz in 1932

Personal information
- Born: 21 March 1904 Orléans, France
- Died: 11 June 1966 (aged 62) Paris, France

Sport
- Sport: Fencing
Medal record
Men's fencing
Representing France
Olympic Games
| Gold medal – first place | 1932 Los Angeles | Team épée |
| Silver medal – second place | 1928 Amsterdam | Team épée |
| Bronze medal – third place | 1936 Berlin | Team épée |

Bernard Schmetz (21 March 1904 – 11 June 1966) was a French fencer. He won a gold, silver and bronze medal at three different Olympic Games in the team épée.
