= Charles Marion (politician) =

French equestrian

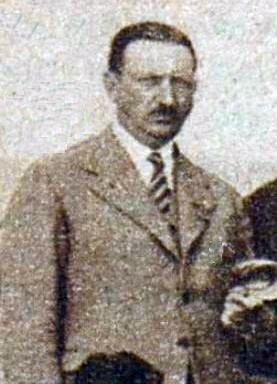

Medal record

Men's equestrian

Representing France

Olympic Games
Gold medal – first place	1932 Los Angeles	Team dressage
Silver medal – second place	1928 Amsterdam	Individual dressage
Silver medal – second place	1932 Los Angeles	Individual dressage

Charles Louis Pierre Marion (French pronunciation: [ʃaʁl lwi pjɛʁ maʁjɔ̃]; or Charles Léonce Pierre Marion, 14 January 1887 – 16 November 1944) was a French assassinated politician and general. He was also a horse rider who competed in the 1928 Summer Olympics and in the 1932 Summer Olympics.

== Horse riding ==
In 1928 he and his horse Linon won the silver medal in the individual dressage competition. Four years later he and his horse Linon won the silver medal in the individual dressage competition again. They were also part of the French dressage team which won the gold medal in the team dressage event.

== Government career ==
Charles Marion served as the head colonel of the "18e RCC " (Régiment de Chasseurs à Cheval) when the World War II was declared in 1939 but shortly after he was sent on a mission as deputy military attaché to the France's Embassy in London. Sir Winston Churchill once said he much appreciated him.

After the Armistice between France and Germany he was promoted a General and a Prefect for the government of Vichy France. He was arrested in October 1944, but while waiting for his trial he was kidnapped from jail on November 16 1944 and summarily executed by French partisans. A document that would have been part of his defence was found in the Gestapo's office of Lyon; it read the Gestapo suspected him of having ties with the "Armée secrète" (military branch of the French Résistance) and strongly recommended his arrest.
