= Svend Olsen =

Danish weightlifter

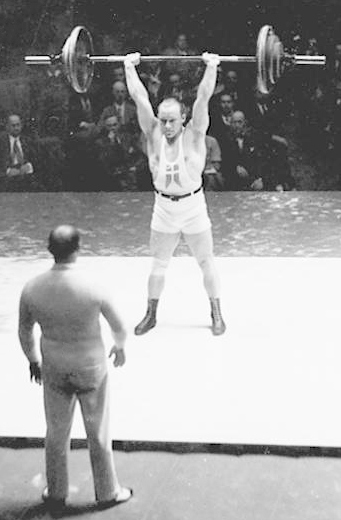
- Olsen at the 1932 Olympics

Personal information
- Born: 17 October 1908 Lodbjerg, Denmark
- Died: 13 December 1980 (aged 72) Hundested, Denmark
- Height: 162 cm (5 ft 4 in)

Sport
- Sport: Weightlifting
Medal record
Representing Denmark
Olympic Games
Silver medal – second place	1932 Los Angeles	-82.5 kg

Svend Egil Benjamin Olsen (17 October 1908 – 13 December 1980) was a Danish light-heavyweight weightlifter who won a silver medal at the 1932 Olympics. The same year he set world records in the clean and jerk, snatch and in the total, but the last record was not ratified. Next year he retired from competitions and later worked as a circus performer.
