= Warren Ingersoll =

American hockey player (1908–1995)

Personal information
- Born: March 22, 1908 Philadelphia, Pennsylvania, U.S.
- Died: September 6, 1995 (aged 87) Spring House, Pennsylvania, U.S.

Sport
- Sport: Field hockey

Warren Ingersoll (March 22, 1908 – September 6, 1995) was an American field hockey player. He competed in the men's tournament at the 1932 Summer Olympics, winning the bronze medal.
