= Thomas Byström =

Swedish equestrian (1893–1979)

Olympic medal record

Men's Equestrian
Silver medal – second place	1932 Los Angeles	Team dressage

Thomas Byström (November 27, 1893 – July 22, 1979) was a Swedish horse rider who competed in the 1932 Summer Olympics. In 1932 he won the silver medal as member of the Swedish dressage team after finishing fourth with his horse Gulliver in the individual dressage competition.
