= William Herrmann (gymnast) =

American gymnast

- Full name: William John Herrmann, Jr.
- Born: January 11, 1912 Philadelphia, Pennsylvania, U.S.
- Died: October 6, 2003 (aged 91) Havertown, Pennsylvania, U.S.

Gymnastics career
- Discipline: Men's artistic gymnastics
- Country represented: United States
- Gym: Penn Athletic Club
Medal record
Men's artistic gymnastics
Representing United States
Event	1st	2nd	3rd
Olympic Games	0	0	1
Total	0	0	1
Olympic Games
Bronze medal – third place	1932 Los Angeles	Tumbling

William John Herrmann, Jr. (January 11, 1912 – October 6, 2003) was an American gymnast and Olympic medalist. He was a member of the United States men's national artistic gymnastics team and competed at the 1932 Summer Olympics in Los Angeles, at which he received a bronze medal in tumbling. As a gymnast, Herrmann was a member of the Penn Athletic Club
