= Louis Hostin =

French weightlifter

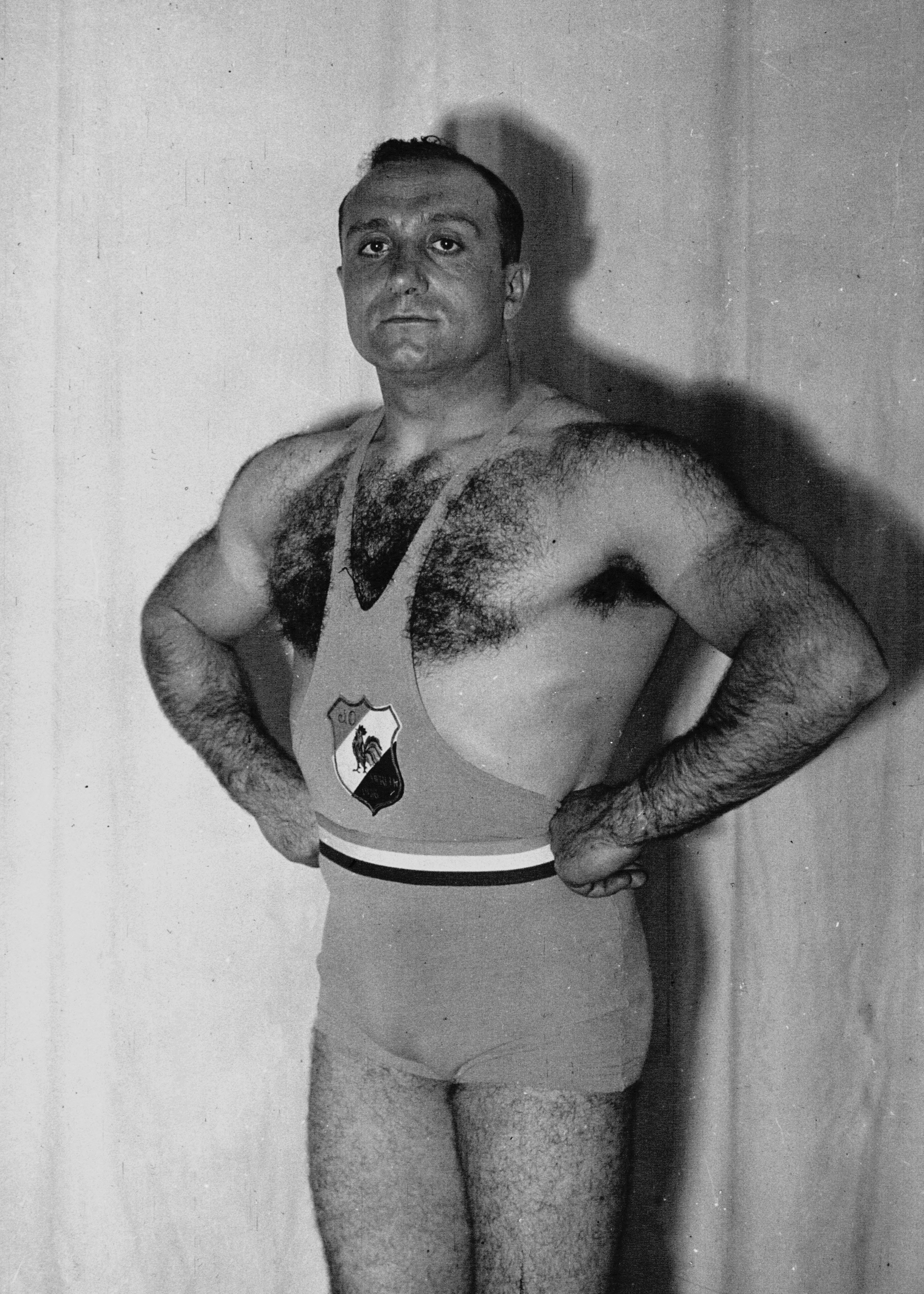
- Louis Hostin in 1936

Personal information
- Born: 21 April 1908 Saint-Étienne, France
- Died: 28 June 1998 (aged 90) Boisseron, France
- Weight: 82 kg (181 lb)

Sport
- Sport: Weightlifting
- Club: OSC Saint-Étienne
Medal record
Representing France
Olympic Games
Silver medal – second place	1928 Amsterdam	-82.5 kg
Gold medal – first place	1932 Los Angeles	-82.5 kg
Gold medal – first place	1936 Berlin	-82.5 kg
World Weightlifting Championships
Silver medal – second place	1937 Paris	-82.5 kg
Bronze medal – third place	1938 Vienna	-82.5 kg

Louis Hostin (21 April 1908 – 28 June 1998) was a French weightlifter. He competed at the 1928, 1932 and 1936 Olympics and won a medal on each of his Olympic appearances. He took silver at the 1928 Summer Games and gold at both the 1932 and 1936 Games. Hostin also won two European titles, in 1930 and 1935, and two medals at world championships in 1937–1938. Between 1927 and 1939 he won 13 national titles and set 10 official world records: 7 in the snatch and 3 in the clean and jerk.

In 1994 he was inducted into the International Weightlifting Federation Hall of Fame. He worked as a croupier.
