= Tracy Jaeckel =

American fencer (1905–1969)

Personal information
- Born: February 2, 1905 New York, New York, United States
- Died: August 6, 1969 (aged 64) Point O'Woods, New York, United States
- Height: 1.79 m (5 ft 10 in)

Sport
- Sport: Fencing
Medal record
Men's fencing
Representing United States
Olympic Games
Bronze medal – third place	1932 Los Angeles	Épée, team

Tracy Jaeckel (February 5, 1905 – August 6, 1969) was an American fencer. He won a bronze medal in the team épée event at the 1932 Summer Olympics.

== See also ==
- List of Princeton University Olympians
