= Frank Righeimer =

American fencer

Personal information
- Born: February 28, 1909 Chicago, Illinois, United States
- Died: July 5, 1998 (aged 89) Palm Beach, Florida, United States

Sport
- Sport: Fencing
Medal record
Men's fencing
Representing United States
Olympic Games
| Bronze medal – third place | 1932 Los Angeles | Foil, team |
| Bronze medal – third place | 1932 Los Angeles | Épée, team |

Frank Righeimer (February 28, 1909 – July 5, 1998) was an American fencer. He won two bronze medals at the 1932 Summer Olympics. He graduated from Yale University and Harvard Law School.
