= Curtis Shears =

American fencer

Personal information
- Born: July 4, 1901 Omaha, Nebraska, United States
- Died: July 30, 1988 (aged 87) Bonita Springs, Florida, United States

Sport
- Sport: Fencing
Medal record
Men's fencing
Representing United States
Olympic Games
Bronze medal – third place	1932 Los Angeles	Épée, team

Curtis Shears (July 4, 1901 – July 30, 1988) was an American fencer. He won a bronze medal in the team épée event at the 1932 Summer Olympics.
