= Gustave Heiss =

Medal record

Men's fencing

Representing the United States

Olympic Games
| Bronze medal – third place | 1932 Los Angeles | Épée, team |

Gustave Marinius Heiss (November 4, 1904 – June 7, 1982) was a United States fencing champion and winner of a bronze medal in team épée fencing at the 1932 Summer Olympics in Los Angeles. He also competed at the 1936 Summer Olympics in Berlin, where the American team placed fifth. He was a four-time U.S. National Épée Champion (1933, 1934, 1936, and 1941).

== Fencing career ==
Heiss was born in Meridian, Mississippi. After briefly attending Tulane University, he entered the United States Military Academy at West Point.

Heiss competed in épée, individually and on a team, and won the following titles:

1931 IFA Individual Épée Champion (USMA)
1932 Outdoor U.S. National Épée Champion
1932 U.S. National Épée Team Champion (NYFC)
1933 U.S. National Épée Team Champion (NYFC)
1933 U.S. National Épée Champion
1934 U.S. National Épée Team Champion (NYFC)
1934 U.S. National Épée Champion
1935 U.S. National Épée Team Champion (NYFC)
1936 U.S. National Épée Team Champion (NYFC)
1936 U.S. National Épée Champion
1939 U.S. National Épée Team Champion (NYFC)
1940 Outdoor U.S. National Épée Champion
1941 U.S. National Épée Team Champion (NYFC)
1941 U.S. National Épée Champion

1932 U.S. Olympic Team, Men's Épée - Bronze medal
1936 U.S. Olympic Team, Men's Épée - 5th place

== Army career ==
During World War II, Heiss was severely wounded while commanding a battalion in the 87th Infantry Division at the Battle of the Bulge (December 1944). He received the Bronze Star, the Silver Star, and the Purple Heart.

== Post World War II career ==
After World War II, Heiss lived in Arlington, Virginia. From 1947 to 1955 he worked as chief of vocational rehabilitation and education at the Veterans Administration. He then worked at the National Security Agency from 1955 to 1958. Marriages to Virginia Jones Heiss and Hertha Wegener Heiss ended in divorce. He had one son from his first marriage and two daughters from his second.

Heiss was elected to the U.S. Fencing Hall of Fame.

He was buried at West Point.
