= Edwin Moles =

American swimmer

Edwin Janey Moles
- A youthful Moles around the age of 20

Personal information
- Full name: Edwin Janey Moles Junior
- Nickname: "Ted"
- Nationality: USA
- Born: December 13, 1908 Minneapolis, Minnesota, U.S.
- Died: July 14, 1969 (aged 60) Ramsey County, Minnesota, U.S.
- Occupations: Executive (Acher-Daniels Midland)
- Height: 185 cm (6 ft 1 in)
- Weight: 82 kg (181 lb)
- Spouses: Helen Archer (m. 1932); Clotilde E. Irvine Moles (m. 1947)
- Children: 6 daughters

Sport
- Sport: Swimming
- Strokes: Breaststroke
- Club: New York Athletic Club
- College team: Princeton University
- Coach: Paul Bosanko (Blake School); Frank Stepp (Princeton); Robert J. H. Kiphuth (Olympics)

Edwin "Ted" Janey Moles Junior (December 13, 1908 – July 14, 1969) was an American swimmer who competed for Princeton University in both swimming and baseball. He participated in the men's 200 metre breaststroke at the 1932 Summer Olympics in Los Angeles. After graduating Princeton in 1931, and attending Yale Law School, he served as a U.S. Army Air Corps veteran of WWII, later reaching the rank of Lieutenant Colonel in the Air Force Reserves. As a primary career, he held the office of a director and Vice-President for the Archer-Daniels-Midland Company. Archer Daniels Midland was originally a food supplier that primarily processed grain, and later became known as a multi-national food processing company based in Chicago.

== Early life and family ==
Edwin Moles Jr., known in print as "Ted" throughout his early life, was born December 13, 1908 in Minneapolis, Minnesota on Stevens Avenue to Edwin Janey Moles Sr. and Elisabeth Kenedy Moles. From a prominent twin cities family, Moles Junior's father, Edwin Moles Sr., was an acting Secretary and a Director for Janney, Semple, Hill and Company, a hardware store and supplier in Minneapolis, and was an officer in the Northwest Bancorporation. Ted, like his father Moles Sr., attended the The Blake School in the twin cities, initially established as a private preparatory school for boys. The school offered strong academics and sought to groom its students to attend elite Eastern Universities. At Blake, a school associated with strong and diverse athletic teams, Ted Moles, as he was known, was a standout swimmer, where he was trained by Coach Paul Bosanko. He missed much of the 1926 season due to an injury to his left foot from an auto accident. Swimming for the Blake School after fully recovering from his injury in January, 1927, Moles broke the Minnesota State Interscholastic record for the 100-yard breast-stroke with a time of 1:15.4. In addition to swimming, he competed in football and hockey at Blake.

== Princeton University ==
From around 1927-1931, Moles, known as "Ted", attended and competed in swimming for Princeton University under Coach Frank Sullivan, but primarily under Howard Stepp who started at Princeton in 1928. Recognized for his achievements, Stepp would become a recipient of the Distinguished Honors Award from the International Swimming Hall of Fame in May, 1989. Moles earned All American honors in swimming at Princeton in 1929. As a Princeton Sophomore, Moles set a new intercollegiate breast-stroke record in the 200-yard event on Saturday, March 2, 1929 in a meet against Dartmouth with a time of 2:37.4. During his collegiate career, he would twice be a national champion in the 200 breaststroke. Princeton's somewhat vigorous training for the era included early season calisthenics, brought to Princeton by Stepp who had competed at Yale with Bob Kiphuth who had instituted early season calisthenics while a coach at Yale. Calisthenics were soon adopted by most Universities as dryland training, which could include focused weight training and would become more carefully designed to strengthen muscles and promote flexibility needed primarily by swimmers. Early season training at Princeton under Stepp also included playing touch football. Later, focusing exclusively on swimming, an average in-season workout might reach around 2500 yards total distance which included a distance swim, followed by pull and kick sets, and some inter-team racing. Moles was Princeton's first swimmer to compete in the Olympics.

By 1930, Moles served as a first-string baseball pitcher for Princeton under Coach Byrd Douglas, a 1916 Princeton graduate. After Princeton, he attended Yale Law School, competing in the 1932 Olympics while still a student at Yale Law.

== 1932 Olympic trials ==
Representing the New York Athletic Club at the time, Moles qualified for the 1932 Olympics at the mid-July trials at Coney Island Park, in Cincinnati, Ohio. Swimmers complained that the water was too warm for fast times in the longer events. Having tied for first in the semi-final heats, Moles placed first in the 200-meter breaststroke final, with a time of 2:55.4, finishing only slightly ahead of second place Thomas Blankenberg of Los Angeles and third place Basel Francis of the Boston Swimming Association. Renowned Japanese Swimming Coaches K. Abe and Masaji Tabata, Japan's Head Coach at the 1932 Olympics, were present at the U.S. trials. Abe and Tabata were well aware of the Japanese swimmers notably faster times in several events, including the 1500-meter freestyle and Moles's 200-meter freestyle. Distance freestyler and future film star Buster Crabbe was one of the best-known American qualifiers.

== 1932 Los Angeles Olympics ==
At the age of 23, he competed in the men's 200 metre breaststroke under Head U.S. Olympic Swim Coach Robert J. H. Kiphuth of Yale University, at the 1932 Los Angeles Olympics where he finished in twelfth place overall with a time of 2:56.8. A very strong Japanese team that year made the competition particularly competitive. Former Japanese medalist Yoshiyuki was a pre-game favorite and won the gold medal in a time of 2:45.4. Japanese swimmer Reizo Koike won the silver with a time of 2:46.6, and Philippine swimmer Tiofilo Yidefonso took the bronze with a time of 2:47.1, having previously won the bronze at the Amsterdam Olympics.

== Marriages ==
On September 26, 1932, he married Helen Hariett Archer, daughter of Shreve M. Archer, President of Archer-Daniels-Midland, who resided in St. Paul and Delwood, Minnesota, on the Northeastern Shore of White Bear Lake in Washington County, Minnesota. The couple were married in Delwood at the home of prominent businessman Shreve M. Archer, who participated in the ceremony, escorting his daughter. Helen Archer had graduated St. Paul's Summit School, and later Miss. Bennett's School, a private girls's school in Milbrook, New York, which included a High School and Junior College. The Moles' made their first residence at a cabin in Delwood, Minnesota on White Bear Lake, about 16-17 miles Northeast of St. Paul.

The Moles divorced on July, 24, 1946, after a petition for divorce from Helen Archer Moles on the grounds of cruel treatment was quickly granted eighteen hours after the suit was filed. Edwin Moles' drinking, which was mentioned in the diary of his second wife Clotilde, may have played a part in Mole's divorce from Helen Archer. Custody of the couple's five children was granted to Miss Archer.

=== Marriage to Clotilde Irvine ===
After leaving active military service, in 1947, Moles married the former Clotilde E. Irvine Churchill, 32, known as "Co Co", remaining married until his death in 1969. Clotilde, who attended the Summit School in her youth, had married husband Creighton Churchill in 1936, though when Churchill died in 1940, she was left a widow. Clotilde's Diary, first published privately after her death in July 1975 by her daughter, was later published as "Through No Fault of My Own: A Girl's diary of Life on Summit Avenue" in 2011 by the University of Minnesota Press. Clotilde's life became the subject of a play, Co Co's Diary, based on her diary, adapted by Ron Peloso, and Bob Beverage, which was featured at History Theater in St. Paul, Minnesota in February, 2012. Clotilde's family was prominent in the lumber industry, and her father Horace Irvine was President of Weyerhaeser Lumber Company at the time of his death in 1950, and had been a partner in the company. Clotilde's childhood home, built in 1910 by Horace Irvine on 1006 Summit Avenue just outside St. Paul, was later donated by Clotilde and her sister after their mother died around 1964. Initially planning to donate the home to the Summit School, they donated it to the state of Minnesota in 1965 and after a state-funded restoration it became the Minnesota Governor's official residence, beginning in the mid-1960's. Clotilde Irvine had another childhood home on Manitou Island, in the area where Ted Moles would retire. After their marriage in 1947, she helped raise three of Ted Moles's daughters.

=== Military service ===
He served with the U.S. Army Air Corp during WWII, later reaching a rank of Lieutenant Colonel in the Air Force Reserves. He was promoted from Captain to Major in the U.S. Army in 1943.

=== Careers and hobbies ===
Miles served with the Archer Daniels Midland Company, reaching the post of director and later vice-president. In avocations, Moles enjoyed the operation of amateur radio, becoming well known. He had a “Big Bertha” antenna mast of 100 feet over his residence on Manitou Island, in White Bear lake, MN, and responded to the call letters WØNLY. He enjoyed hunting and fishing in his retirement.

Moles died at the age of 60 on July 15, 1969 in Ramsey County, Minnesota at a hospital in St. Paul, Minnesota. His last place of residence was in the town of White Bear Lake on Manitou Island. He was survived by his second wife Clotilde E. Irvine Moles and six daughters. Services were held at the Episcopal Church of St. John the Evangelist in Minnesota's St. Paul, and he was buried in a crypt at the large and historic Oakland Cemetery in central St. Paul.
