= Henry Duey =

American weightlifter (1908–1993)

Personal information
- Nickname: Tex
- Nationality: American
- Born: Henry Ludwig Duey; May 1, 1908 Chicago, Illinois
- Died: February 13, 1993 (aged 84) Chipley, Florida
- Occupation: Weightlifter
Medal record
Representing United States
Olympic Games
Bronze medal – third place	1932 Los Angeles	-82.5kg

Henry Ludwig Duey (May 1, 1908 – February 13, 1993) was an American weightlifter and Olympic medalist. Duey was born in Chicago, Illinois. He won the bronze medal at the 1932 Summer Olympics in Los Angeles.

== Career ==
At the 1932 Olympics, Duey won the bronze medal in the light-heavyweight division with ease however, he was not close to beating the first and second place competitors. This was Duey's only medal that he had won in an international competition.

== Death ==
Duey died on February 13, 1993, at the age of 84 in Chipley, Florida.
