= Alvin Moore (equestrian) =

American equestrian

Olympic medal record

Men's Equestrian
Bronze medal – third place	1932 Los Angeles	Team dressage

Alvin Hovy Moore (November 19, 1891 – November 9, 1972) was an American horse rider who competed in the 1932 Summer Olympics. In 1932 he and his horse Water Pat won the bronze medal as member of the American dressage team in the team dressage competition after finishing seventh in the individual dressage event.

Moore served in the United States Army during both World War I and II, earning a Bronze Star Medal. He retired from active duty as a colonel and was buried at Fort Bliss National Cemetery after his death.
