= Isaac Kitts =

American equestrian

Olympic medal record

Men's Equestrian
Bronze medal – third place	1932 Los Angeles	Team dressage

Isaac Leonard Kitts (January 15, 1896 – April 1, 1953) was an American horse rider who competed in the 1932 Summer Olympics and in the 1936 Summer Olympics. In 1932 he and his horse American Lady won the bronze medal as member of the American dressage team in the team dressage competition after finishing sixth in the individual dressage event.

Four years later he and his horse American Lady finished ninth as part of the American dressage team in the team dressage competition after finishing 25th in the individual dressage event.

Kitts was born in New York state. During World War I, he was commissioned as a field artillery officer in February 1918. After the war, Kitts joined the Regular Army in September 1920. He graduated from the United States Army Field Artillery School Battery Officer Course in 1926 and the Advanced Course in 1933. Kitts graduated from the United States Army Cavalry School Advanced Equitation Course in 1928 and the Command and General Staff School in 1939. After World War II, he retired from active duty as a colonel on October 31, 1946. During his career, Kitts as awarded the Legion of Merit and the Bronze Star Medal.

After his death in Indiana, Kitts was buried at Arlington National Cemetery on April 7, 1953.
