= Hiram Tuttle (equestrian) =

American equestrian

Hiram E. Tuttle
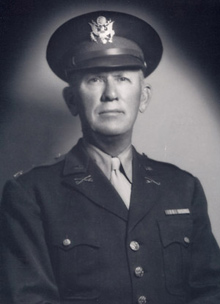

Medal record

Representing the United States

Men's Equestrian
Bronze medal – third place	1932 Los Angeles	Individual dressage
Bronze medal – third place	1932 Los Angeles	Team dressage

Hiram Edwin Tuttle (December 22, 1882 in Dexter, Maine – November 11, 1956 in Fort Riley, Kansas) was an American equestrian who competed in dressage at the 1932 Summer Olympics and in the 1936 Summer Olympics. He is the only American dressage rider to win an individual medal at an Olympic Games. Tuttle was a lawyer in Boston prior to being a US Army quartermaster officer from 1930 to 1944. He owned and trained his own horses, unusual in a time when the majority of Olympic competitors rode Army-owned horses, and is buried near three of them at the cemetery in Fort Riley.

== Biography ==
Tuttle originally trained and practiced as a lawyer in Boston, but in 1917 joined the US Army as a commissioned officer. Between 1930 and his retirement as a colonel in 1944, he held a post in Fort Riley, Kansas, at the Cavalry School. Tuttle's equestrian skills were largely self-taught, and he became the top dressage rider in the US before the majority of the country even knew such a sport existed. Army historian Louis DiMarco says, "Tuttle did so much with so little and was so little appreciated. He was the only officer to focus strictly on dressage. Everybody else in the Army world...who did dressage learned what to do and how to do it from him."

Tuttle owned and trained his own horses, partially so that the horses could focus strictly on dressage and not be used for other sports or cavalry exercises; this was unusual for the times. He was set apart from many of the Olympic riders of the time by being older, not a West Point graduate, a quartermaster officer, and riding in dressage when few other officers appreciated the formality and discipline of the sport. He trained many of the military dressage riders who followed in his footsteps, including Major Robert Borg who competed in dressage at the 1948 and 1952 Summer Games. After his retirement, Tuttle continued to ride and train, and never sold his Olympic mounts. He is buried along with three of his horses (Vast, Si Murray and Olympic) at the Fort Riley cemetery.

In 2002, Tuttle was inducted into the United States Dressage Federation Hall of Fame in "recognition of his seminal contributions as a Cavalry officer to the development of dressage in the U.S."

== Competition ==
In 1932 the Americans participated in the team dressage competition for the first time since 1920. Tuttle competed in his first Olympic Games at the 1932 Los Angeles Games. At this event, he took bronze in the individual dressage, becoming the first American dressage rider in Olympic history to win an individual medal. This distinction is one that he holds as of 2012. It is also the only Olympics where Americans won individual medals in all three equestrian events (dressage, show jumping and three-day eventing). The American team, which included Tuttle, also won a bronze. His horse in these events, named Olympic, had been purchased for $1. In 1936, Tuttle returned to Olympic competition in at the Berlin Games. However, he only placed 27th individually out of 29 riders, with the American team taking 9th out of nine teams entered. Two horses used by the Americans, Si Murray and Olympic, were trained by Tuttle. Tuttle stated in a post-Games report that a German coach had told him that a winning dressage team needed "European-bred horses, European competition experience and political clout in the host country; and that, having none of these, the Americans likely wouldn't fare well"; based on the American's performance, Tuttle concluded the coach was correct.
