= Nickolaus Hirschl =

Austrian wrestler (1906–1991)

Nickolaus "Mickey" Hirschl
- Born: March 20, 1906; Vienna, Austria
- Died: October 10, 1991 (aged 85)
- Known for: Austrian Shot put and Discus Junior Champion; Austrian Heavyweight Weightlifting Junior Champion; Austrian Pentathlon Champion (1923–30); Austrian Heavyweight Wrestling Champion (10 years); European Heavyweight Wrestling Champion (1932); Olympic bronze medals in Heavyweight Freestyle and Heavyweight Greco-Roman Wrestling (1932)
- Awards: International Jewish Sports Hall of Fame (1993)

Olympic medal record

Representing Austria

Men's Greco-Roman wrestling
Bronze medal – third place	1932 Los Angeles	Heavyweight

Men's freestyle wrestling
Bronze medal – third place	1932 Los Angeles	Heavyweight

Maccabiah Games
Gold medal – first place	1932 Palestine	Heavyweight

Nickolaus (also "Nikolaus") "Mickey" (also "Micki") Hirschl (March 20, 1906 – October 10, 1991) was an Austrian Olympic-medal-winning wrestler. He was also a European heavyweight wrestling champion, and for 10 years he held the title of Austrian heavyweight wrestling champion. He was also an Austrian shot put and discus junior champion, Austrian heavyweight weightlifting junior champion, and for seven years the Austrian pentathlon champion.

== Early life ==
Hirschl was Jewish, and was born in Vienna, Austria. His parents were kosher butchers, and his father was president of a synagogue.

== Sports career ==
At 15 years of age, he won the Austrian junior championship in shot put and discus. At 16 years of age, he won the Austrian junior championship in heavyweight weightlifting.

At 17 years of age, he became the pentathlon champion of Austria, winning the title in 1923. He held it for seven years.

At the age of 18, he won the Austrian heavyweight wrestling championship. He was the Austrian champion for the following 10 years. In 1932, Hirschl won the gold medal in the European Wrestling Championships heavyweight championship. He wrestled for the Hakoah Vienna wrestling team, which won 127 international titles from 1929 to 1934.

At the 1932 Olympics in Los Angeles, he won a bronze medal in heavyweight freestyle, and a bronze medal in heavyweight Greco-Roman.

At the 1932 Maccabiah Games in Mandatory Palestine, he won a gold medal in Greco-Roman wrestling in the heavyweight category.

In 1936, he boycotted the Olympics which were to be held in Berlin, Nazi Germany, refusing to participate due to the racial policies of the Nazis.

== Life after sports career ==
Hirschl left Austria to escape the Nazis before the start of World War II. Most of his family was killed in the Holocaust.

He first moved to pre-Israel Palestine. He joined the British Commandos, and served fighting the Germans in North Africa. After the war, he married and moved to Australia in 1947, where he ran a meat business.

He was inducted into the International Jewish Sports Hall of Fame in 1993.

== See also ==
- List of select Jewish wrestlers
- List of Olympic medalists in Greco-Roman wrestling
- List of 1932 Summer Olympics medal winners
