= Equestrian at the 1932 Summer Olympics – Individual eventing =

Equestrian at the Olympics

Individual eventing at the Games of the X Olympiad
- Venue: Riviera Country Club; Westchester; Olympic Stadium
- Date: 10–13 August 1932
- Competitors: 14 from 6 nations
- Winning total: 1813.333 points

Medalists
1st place, gold medalist(s)		Charles Pahud de Mortanges	Netherlands
2nd place, silver medalist(s)		Earl Foster Thomson	United States
3rd place, bronze medalist(s)		Clarence von Rosen, Jr.	Sweden

The individual eventing in equestrian at the 1932 Summer Olympics in Los Angeles was held at the Riviera Country Club (dressage), a specially built course in Westchester (cross-country), and the Olympic Stadium (jumping) from 10 to 13 August. NOCs were limited to three horse and rider pairs.

Charles Pahud de Mortanges and Marcroix, the defending gold medalists, became the first equestrian pair to repeat as champions. They did so despite not winning any of the three stages.

== Competition format ==
The team and individual eventing competitions used the same scores. Eventing consisted of a dressage test, a cross-country test, and a jumping test. The total maximum score was 2000 points, with 400 available in dressage, 1300 in cross-country, and 300 in jumping. In the dressage portion, three juries gave scores out of 400; the average of the three was the score for the segment. In the cross-country section, penalties were issued for faults and for going over the time limit (with small bonuses available for finishing early); the total penalties minus bonuses were subtracted from 1300 to give the score for the round. Penalties were also given for faults and slow performances in jumping, with the total penalties subtracted from 300 for that round. The three segment scores were summed to give a final score.

== Schedule ==
Date	Round
Wednesday, 10 August 1932; Thursday, 11 August 1932	Dressage
Friday, 12 August 1932	Cross-country
Saturday, 13 August 1932	Jumping

== Results ==
=== Standings after dressage ===
Chamberlin won the first portion of the eventing competition, taking a lead slightly over 7 points against his countryman Argo.

Rank	Rider	Horse	Nation	Dressage
1	Harry Chamberlin	Pleasant Smiles	United States	340.333
2	Edwin Argo	Honolulu Tomboy	United States	333.000
3	Charles Pahud de Mortanges	Marcroix	Netherlands	311.833
4	Clarence von Rosen Jr.	Sunnyside Maid	Sweden	310.667
5	Arne Francke	Fridolin	Sweden	303.333
6	Earl Foster Thomson	Jenny Camp	United States	300.000
7	Ernst Hallberg	Marokan	Sweden	290.333
8	Aernout van Lennep	Henk	Netherlands	277.500
9	Karel Schummelketel	Duiveltje	Netherlands	267.500
10	Morishige Yamamoto	Kingo	Japan	257.333
11	Tara Naro	Sonshin	Japan	242.000
12	Shunzo Kido	Kyu Gun	Japan	212.833
13	José Pérez Allende	El Torero	Mexico	171.167
14	Armando Barriguete	Monza	Mexico	119.167

=== Standings after cross country ===
With 1300 points available, the cross country competition was by far the largest contributor to the eventing scores. The dressage leaders did not fare well in the cross country portion, with Chamberlin finishing fifth in the segment with 192.5 penalties and Argo finishing eighth with 392.5 penalties. Thomson, sixth after dressage, vaulted to the lead with a nearly clean round--incurring 35 time penalties in the open country but earning 6 bonus time points in the steeplechase. De Mortanges and von Rosen, second and third in the round with 58.0 and 58.5 penalties, moved into second and third place overall. The gap between von Rosen and Chamberlin--now in fourth place--was over 100 points, a very difficult distance to close with only the jumping portion remaining; barring disaster for one of the three, the medalists had largely been decided at this point and were competing with each other for final placement. Barriguete did not start the cross country portion; four others did not finish it.

Rank	Rider	Horse	Nation	Dressage	Cross Country	Total
1	Earl Foster Thomson	Jenny Camp	United States	300.000	1271.000	1571.000
2	Charles Pahud de Mortanges	Marcroix	Netherlands	311.833	1242.000	1553.833
3	Clarence von Rosen Jr.	Sunnyside Maid	Sweden	310.667	1241.500	1552.167
4	Harry Chamberlin	Pleasant Smiles	United States	340.333	1107.500	1447.833
5	Ernst Hallberg	Marokan	Sweden	290.333	1129.000	1419.333
6	Karel Schummelketel	Duiveltje	Netherlands	267.500	1105.000	1372.500
7	Morishige Yamamoto	Kingo	Japan	257.333	1092.500	1349.833
8	Edwin Argo	Honolulu Tomboy	United States	333.000	907.500	1240.500
9	Aernout van Lennep	Henk	Netherlands	277.500	797.500	1075.000
5	Arne Francke	Fridolin	Sweden	303.333	Eliminated	
11	Tara Naro	Sonshin	Japan	242.000	Eliminated	
12	Shunzo Kido	Kyu Gun	Japan	212.833	Eliminated	
13	José Pérez Allende	El Torero	Mexico	171.167	Eliminated	
14	Armando Barriguete	Monza	Mexico	119.167	Did not start	

=== Final results after jumping ===
Argo had a clean round, with no faults and only 0.75 time penalties, to make up significant ground on the field; nobody else had fewer than 40 penalties in the round. However, the three leaders after the cross country segment did well enough to each medal. Thomson, who had the lead, fared worst, incurring 60 penalties. This allowed de Mortanges, with only 40 penalties in the round, to overtake him and successfully repeat the Olympic championship. Von Rosen, with 40 jumping penalties as well, would also have passed Thomson if not for von Rosen's 2.75 time penalties--just enough to keep the Swede in the third position and give the American the silver medal.

Rank	Rider	Horse	Nation	Dressage	Cross-country	Jumping	Total
1st place, gold medalist(s)	Charles Pahud de Mortanges	Marcroix	Netherlands	311.833	1242.000	260.000	1813.833
2nd place, silver medalist(s)	Earl Foster Thomson	Jenny Camp	United States	300.000	1271.000	240.000	1811.000
3rd place, bronze medalist(s)	Clarence von Rosen Jr.	Sunnyside Maid	Sweden	310.667	1241.500	257.250	1809.417
4	Harry Chamberlin	Pleasant Smiles	United States	340.333	1107.500	240.000	1687.833
5	Ernst Hallberg	Marokan	Sweden	290.333	1129.000	260.000	1679.333
6	Karel Schummelketel	Duiveltje	Netherlands	267.500	1105.000	242.000	1614.500
7	Morishige Yamamoto	Kingo	Japan	257.333	1092.500	259.750	1609.583
8	Edwin Argo	Honolulu Tomboy	United States	333.000	907.500	299.250	1539.250
9	Aernout van Lennep	Henk	Netherlands	277.500	797.500	185.750	1260.750
