= Equestrian at the 1932 Summer Olympics – Team eventing =

Equestrian at the Olympics

Team eventing at the Games of the X Olympiad
- Venue: Riviera Country Club; Westchester; Olympic Stadium
- Date: 10–13 August 1932
- Competitors: 12 from 4 nations
- Winning total: 5038.083

Medalists
1st place, gold medalist(s)		Earl Foster Thomson; Harry Chamberlin; Edwin Argo	United States
2nd place, silver medalist(s)		Charles Pahud de Mortanges; Karel Schummelketel; Aernout van Lennep	Netherlands

The team eventing in equestrian at the 1932 Summer Olympics in Los Angeles was held at the Riviera Country Club (dressage), a specially built course in Westchester (cross-country), and the Olympic Stadium (jumping) from 10 to 13 August. NOCs were limited to three horse and rider pairs.

Of the four teams that entered the competition, two had all three members finish. No bronze medal was awarded.

== Competition format ==
The team and individual eventing competitions used the same scores. Eventing consisted of a dressage test, a cross-country test, and a jumping test. The total individual maximum score was 2000 points, with 400 available in dressage, 1300 in cross-country, and 300 in jumping. In the dressage portion, three juries gave scores out of 400; the average of the three was the score for the segment. In the cross-country section, penalties were issued for faults and for going over the time limit (with small bonuses available for finishing early); the total penalties minus bonuses were subtracted from 1300 to give the score for the round. Penalties were also given for faults and slow performances in jumping, with the total penalties subtracted from 300 for that round. The three segment scores were summed to give a final score.

The scores of the three team members were added to give a team score. All three members of the team had to finish the competition to receive a team score.

== Schedule ==
Date	Round
Wednesday, 10 August 1932; Thursday, 11 August 1932	Dressage
Friday, 12 August 1932	Cross-country
Saturday, 13 August 1932	Jumping

== Results ==
=== Standings after dressage ===
Team rank	Nation	Individual results			Team penalties
Team rank	Nation	Rider	Horse	Score	Team penalties
1	United States	Harry Chamberlin	Pleasant Smiles	340.333	973.333
1	United States	Edwin Argo	Honolulu Tomboy	333.000	973.333
1	United States	Earl Foster Thomson	Jenny Camp	300.000	973.333
2	Sweden	Clarence von Rosen Jr.	Sunnyside Maid	310.667	904.333
2	Sweden	Arne Francke	Fridolin	303.333	904.333
2	Sweden	Ernst Hallberg	Marokan	290.333	904.333
3	Netherlands	Charles Pahud de Mortanges	Marcroix	311.833	856.833
3	Netherlands	Aernout van Lennep	Henk	277.500	856.833
3	Netherlands	Karel Schummelketel	Duiveltje	267.500	856.833
4	Japan	Morishige Yamamoto	Kingo	257.333	712.166
4	Japan	Tara Naro	Sonshin	242.000	712.166
4	Japan	Shunzo Kido	Kyu Gun	212.833	712.166

=== Standings after cross-country ===
Team rank	Nation	Individual results					Total team score
Team rank	Nation	Rider	Horse	Dressage score	Cross country score	Total score	Total team score
1	United States	Earl Foster Thomson	Jenny Camp	300.000	1271.000	1571.000	3661.666
1	United States	Harry Chamberlin	Pleasant Smiles	340.333	1107.500	1447.833	3661.666
1	United States	Edwin Argo	Honolulu Tomboy	333.000	907.500	1240.500	3661.666
2	Netherlands	Charles Pahud de Mortanges	Marcroix	311.833	1242.000	1553.833	4001.383
2	Netherlands	Karel Schummelketel	Duiveltje	267.500	1105.000	1372.500	4001.383
2	Netherlands	Aernout van Lennep	Henk	277.500	797.500	1075.00	4001.383
–	Sweden	Clarence von Rosen Jr.	Sunnyside Maid	310.667	1241.500	1552.167	Eliminated
–	Sweden	Ernst Hallberg	Marokan	290.333	1129.000	1419.333	Eliminated
–	Sweden	Arne Francke	Fridolin	303.333	Eliminated		Eliminated
–	Japan	Morishige Yamamoto	Kingo	257.333	1092.500	1349.833	Eliminated
–	Japan	Tara Naro	Sonshin	242.000	Eliminated		Eliminated
–	Japan	Shunzo Kido	Kyu Gun	212.833	Eliminated		Eliminated

=== Final standings ===
Final results below, determined by combining the three overall scores for each team.

Team rank	Nation	Individual results						Total team score
Team rank	Nation	Rider	Horse	Dressage score	Cross country score	Jumping score	Total score	Total team score
1st place, gold medalist(s)	United States	Earl Foster Thomson	Jenny Camp	300.000	1271.000	240.000	1811.000	5038.083
1st place, gold medalist(s)	United States	Harry Chamberlin	Pleasant Smiles	340.333	1107.500	240.000	1687.833	5038.083
1st place, gold medalist(s)	United States	Edwin Argo	Honolulu Tomboy	333.000	907.500	299.250	1539.250	5038.083
2nd place, silver medalist(s)	Netherlands	Charles Pahud de Mortanges	Marcroix	311.833	1242.000	260.000	1813.833	4689.083
2nd place, silver medalist(s)	Netherlands	Karel Schummelketel	Duiveltje	267.500	1105.000	242.000	1614.500	4689.083
2nd place, silver medalist(s)	Netherlands	Aernout van Lennep	Henk	277.500	797.500	185.750	1260.750	4689.083
