= Equestrian at the 1932 Summer Olympics – Individual jumping =

Equestrian at the Olympics

Individual jumping at the Games of the X Olympiad
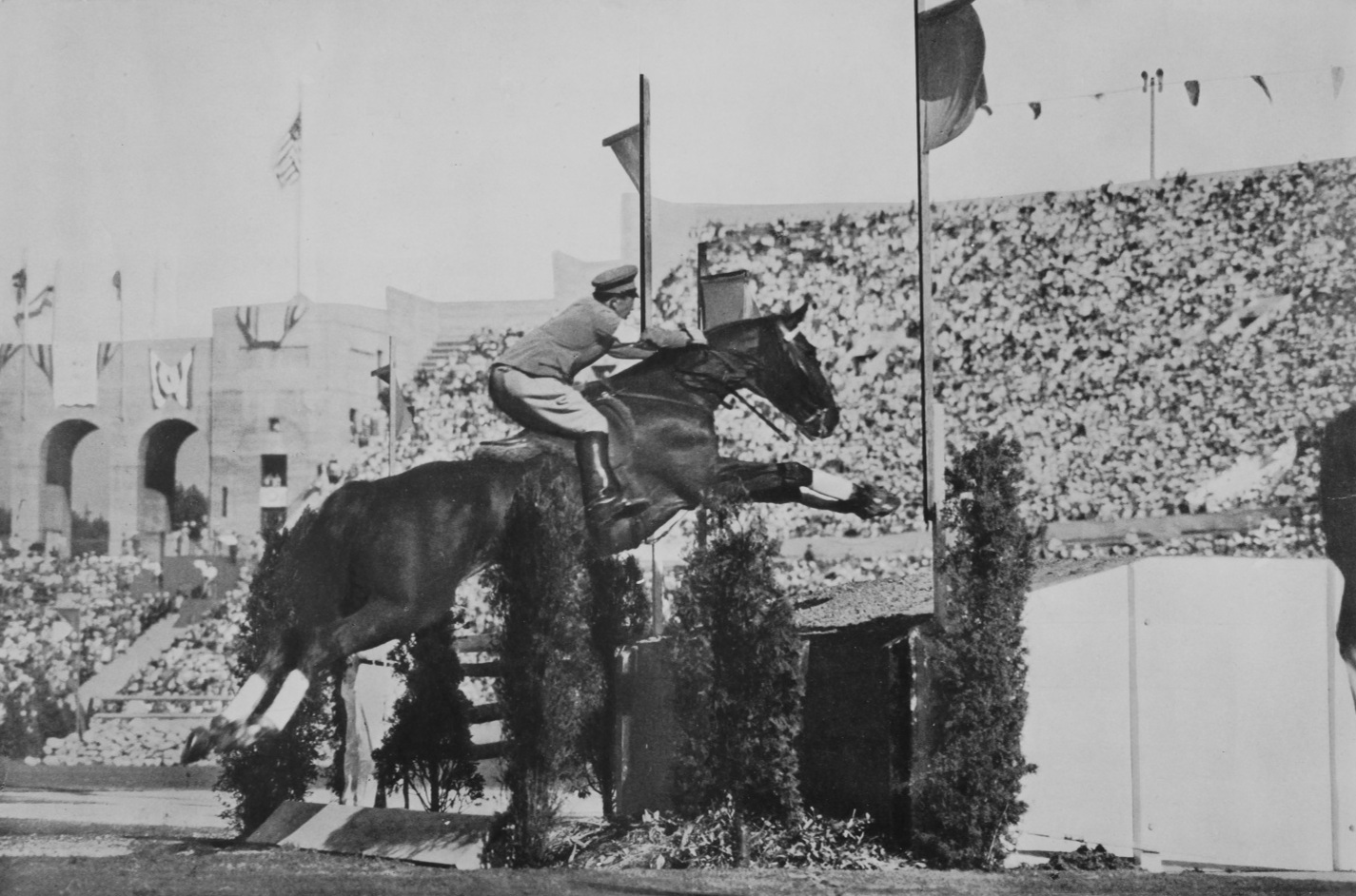
- Takeichi Nishi, the gold medalist, competing
- Venue: Los Angeles Memorial Coliseum
- Date: 14 August 1932
- Competitors: 11 from 4 nations
- Winning total: 8 penalties

Medalists
1st place, gold medalist(s)		Takeichi Nishi	Japan
2nd place, silver medalist(s)		Harry Chamberlin	United States
3rd place, bronze medalist(s)		Clarence von Rosen, Jr.	Sweden

The individual show jumping in equestrian at the 1932 Summer Olympics in Los Angeles was held on 14 August. The event was called the "Prix des Nations" at the time. There were 14 competitors from 4 nations.

The difficulty of transporting horses between Europe and Los Angeles meant that only one European nation, Sweden, participated. The team competition was decided by summing the scores of each nation's three riders in the individual competition. While individual medals were awarded, none of the teams managed to have three riders finish the course so team medals were not awarded. The 18-obstacle, 20-effort course was 1,060 meters in length, and included two fences at 1.60 meters, a very difficult wall, and a water that was 5 meters in width. 100,000 spectators were present at the show jumping competition. The event was won by Takeichi Nishi of Japan, the nation's first medal in individual jumping. The United States also earned its first medal in the event, with Harry Chamberlin's silver. Clarence von Rosen, Jr. put Sweden on the podium for the first time since 1920 with his bronze.

== Background ==
This was the sixth appearance of the event, which had first been held at the 1900 Summer Olympics and has been held at every Summer Olympics at which equestrian sports have been featured (that is, excluding 1896, 1904, and 1908). It is the oldest event on the current programme, the only one that was held in 1900.

Two riders from the 1928 competition returned: eighteenth-place finisher Harry Chamberlin of the United States and twenty-fifth-place finisher Ernst Hallberg of Sweden.

Mexico made its debut in the event. Sweden competed for the fifth time, the most of any nation competing and tying Belgium and France for most of any nation; Sweden had missed only the inaugural 1900 competition, while Belgium and France were missing the individual jumping for the first time in 1932.

== Competition format ==
The course, designed by former American competitors John Burke Barry and Sloan Doak, was 1060 metres long with 18 obstacles (20 jumps). The maximum height of the jumps increased from 1.4 metres in previous editions to 1.6 metres in 1932; the long jumps increased from 4 metres to 5 metres. This resulted in a "brutally difficult" course that eliminated six of 11 riders.

A single run was held, with the rider with the fewest faults winning.

== Schedule ==
Date	Time	Round
Sunday, 14 August 1932	14:30	Final

== Results ==
Only five of the riders finished the course, with each of the other six disqualified for having three refusals. The Mexican team was eliminated before the halfway mark (Mejia on jump 2, Bocanegra on jump 5, and Ortíz on jump 8). The tenth jump claimed two pairs, Francke and Imamura. Wofford made it the furthest of the eliminated riders, reaching the third refusal on jump 11.

Von Rosen rode early and took the lead with 16 faults. Chamberlin bettered that with 12. Nishi was the final rider; he took the course slower than the others (incurring a 1-point time penalty) and finished with only 7 jumping penalties, giving him a total of 8 penalties and the gold medal.

Rank	Rider	Horse	Nation	Penalties		
Rank	Rider	Horse	Nation	Jump	Time	Total
1st place, gold medalist(s)	Takeichi Nishi	Uranus	Japan	7	1	8
2nd place, silver medalist(s)	Harry Chamberlin	Show Girl	United States	12	0	12
3rd place, bronze medalist(s)	Clarence von Rosen, Jr.	Empire	Sweden	16	0	16
4	William Bradford	Joe Aleshire	United States	24	0	24
5	Ernst Hallberg	Kornett	Sweden	37	13.5	50.5
—	Andrés Bocanegra	El As	Mexico	DNF	DNF	DNF
—	Arne Francke	Urfe	Sweden	DNF	DNF	DNF
—	Yasushi Imamura	Sonny Boy	Japan	DNF	DNF	DNF
—	Carlos Mejia	Kanguro	Mexico	DNF	DNF	DNF
—	Procopio Ortíz	Pinello	Mexico	DNF	DNF	DNF
—	John William Wofford	Babe Wartham	United States	DNF	DNF	DNF
