= Equestrian at the 1932 Summer Olympics – Team jumping =

Equestrian at the Olympics

Team jumping at the Games of the X Olympiad
- Venue: Olympic Stadium
- Date: 14 August 1932
- Competitors: 9 from 3 nations
- Winning total: None

The team jumping in equestrian at the 1932 Summer Olympics in Los Angeles was held on 14 August. The event was called the Prix des Nations at the time.

The team competition was decided by summing the scores of each nation's three riders in the individual competition. While individual medals were awarded, none of the teams managed to have three riders finish the course so team medals were not awarded.

== Results ==
Rank	Nation	Riders	Horses	Penalties		Total penalties
Rank	Nation	Riders	Horses	Jump	Time	Total penalties
–	Sweden	Clarence von Rosen, Jr.	Empire	16	0	DNF
–	Sweden	Ernst Hallberg	Kornett	37	13.5	DNF
–	Sweden	Arne Francke	Urfe	DNF	DNF	DNF
–	United States	Harry Chamberlin	Show Girl	12	0	DNF
–	United States	William Bradford	Joe Aleshire	24	0	DNF
–	United States	John William Wofford	Babe Wartham	DNF	DNF	DNF
–	Mexico	Andres Bocanegra	El As	DNF	DNF	DNF
–	Mexico	Carlos H. Mejia	Kanguro	DNF	DNF	DNF
–	Mexico	Procopio Ortiz Reyes	Pinello	DNF	DNF	DNF
