= 1932 Summer Olympics medal table =

1932 Summer Olympics medals
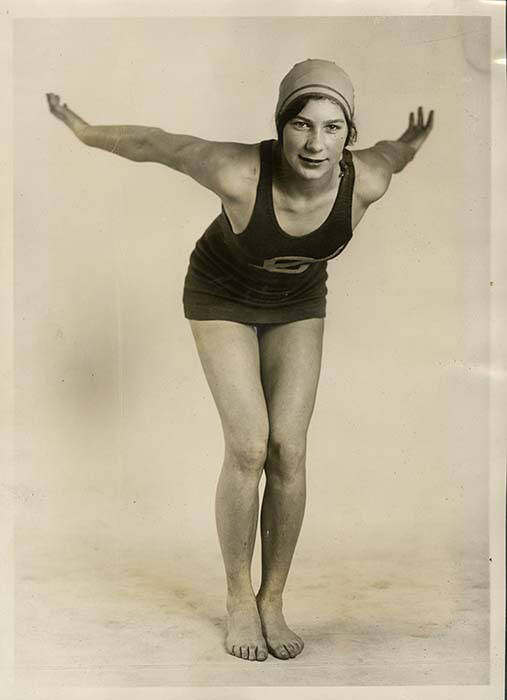
- American swimmer Helene Madison won three gold medals at the 1932 Summer Olympics, tied for the most of any competing athlete.
- Location: Los Angeles, United States

Highlights
- Most gold medals: United States (44)
- Most total medals: United States (110)
- Medalling NOCs: 28

World map showing the medal achievements of each country during the 1932 Summer Olympics Legend: represents countries that won at least one gold medal. represents countries that won at least one silver medal but no gold medals. represents countries that won at least one bronze medal (no gold or silver). represents participating countries that did not win medals. represents entities that did not participate at the 1932 Summer Olympics.

The 1932 Summer Olympics, officially known as the Games of the X Olympiad, were an international multi-sport event held in Los Angeles, California, United States, from July 30 to August 14. A total of 1,334 athletes representing 37 National Olympic Committees (NOCs) participated, including Colombia and the Republic of China, who took part for the first time. The games featured 117 events in 14 sports across 20 disciplines. The games also featured 9 medal events in various art competitions Germany was also awarded a gold medal in alpinism for a climb that took place before the games, which is counted in the official medal count.

Athletes representing 28 NOCs received at least one medal, with 19 NOCs winning at least one gold medal. The United States won the most overall medals, with 110, and the most gold medals, with 44. Latvia and Mexico won their first Summer Olympic medals of any kind. Among individual participants, Italian fencer Giulio Gaudini (three silver, one bronze), Hungarian gymnast István Pelle (two gold, two silver), and Finnish gymnast Heikki Savolainen (one silver, three bronze) had the most total medals with four each. Italian gymnast Romeo Neri and American swimmer Helene Madison tied for the most gold medals, with three each.

== Medal table ==
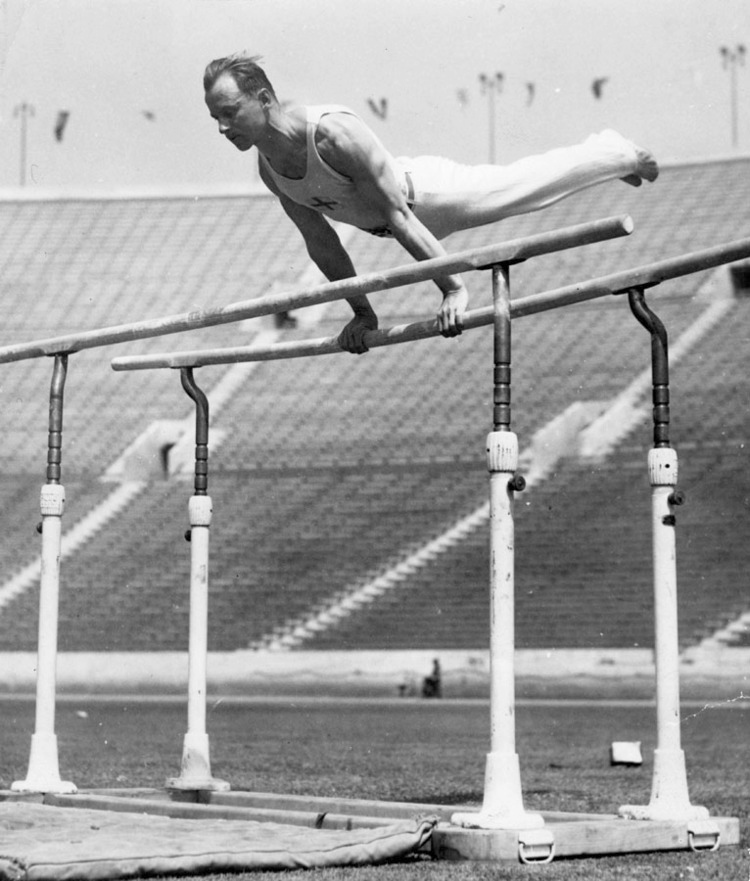
Finnish gymnast Heikki Savolainen won four medals at the 1932 games (one silver, three bronze), tied for the most among individual participants.

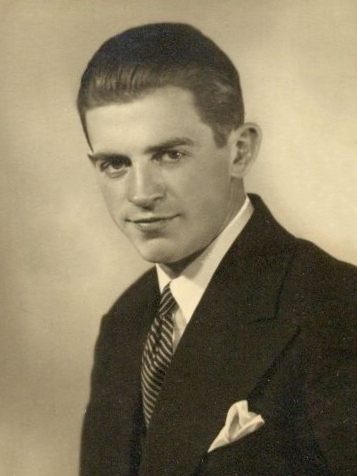
Latvian race walker Jānis Daliņš won the first ever Olympic medal for Latvia, taking silver in the men's 50 kilometres walk.

The medal table is based on information provided by the International Olympic Committee (IOC) and is consistent with IOC conventional sorting in its published medal tables. The table uses the Olympic medal table sorting method. By default, the table is ordered by the number of gold medals the athletes from a nation have won, where a nation is an entity represented by a NOC. The number of silver medals is taken into consideration next and then the number of bronze medals. If teams are still tied, equal ranking is given and they are listed alphabetically by their IOC country code.

The literature and paintings portion of the arts competitions did not award a bronze medal, while the music event did not award bronze or gold, awarding only a silver medal.

In 8 Metre sailing, there were only two teams competing, which resulted in a bronze medal not being awarded in the event. In equestrian team jumping, no medals were awarded due to all involved teams failing to finish with enough riders to qualify for a medal. In equestrian team eventing, only two teams finished, resulting in a bronze medal going unclaimed. In alpinism, only a gold medal and no silver or bronze medal were awarded.

* Host nation (United States)

1932 Summer Olympics medal table
Rank	NOC	Gold	Silver	Bronze	Total
1	United States*	44	36	30	110
2	Italy	12	12	12	36
3	France	11	5	4	20
4	Sweden	10	5	9	24
5	Japan	7	7	4	18
6	Hungary	6	5	5	16
7	Germany	5	12	7	24
8	Finland	5	8	12	25
9	Great Britain	5	7	5	17
10	Poland	3	2	4	9
11	Australia	3	1	1	5
12	Argentina	3	1	0	4
13	Canada	2	5	9	16
14	Netherlands	2	5	1	8
15	South Africa	2	0	3	5
16	Ireland	2	0	0	2
17	Czechoslovakia	1	3	2	6
18	Austria	1	1	3	5
19	India	1	0	0	1
20	Denmark	0	5	3	8
21	Mexico	0	2	0	2
22	Latvia	0	1	0	1
22	New Zealand	0	1	0	1
22	Switzerland	0	1	0	1
25	Philippines	0	0	3	3
26	Belgium	0	0	1	1
26	Spain	0	0	1	1
26	Uruguay	0	0	1	1
Totals (28 entries)		125	125	120	370

== See also ==
- All-time Olympic Games medal table
- List of 1932 Summer Olympics medal winners
- 1932 Winter Olympics medal table
