= Netherlands at the 1932 Summer Olympics =

- Flag of the Netherlands
- IOC code: NED
- NOC: Dutch Olympic Committee

in Los Angeles
- Competitors: 45 (31 men and 14 women) in 9 sports
- Flag bearer: Charles Pahud de Mortanges
- Medals Ranked 13th: Gold 2 Silver 5 Bronze 0 Total 7

Summer Olympics appearances (overview)
- 1900; 1904; 1908; 1912; 1920; 1924; 1928; 1932; 1936; 1948; 1952; 1956; 1960; 1964; 1968; 1972; 1976; 1980; 1984; 1988; 1992; 1996; 2000; 2004; 2008; 2012; 2016; 2020; 2024

Other related appearances
- 1906 Intercalated Games

The Netherlands, the previous host of the 1928 Summer Olympics in Amsterdam, competed at the 1932 Summer Olympics in Los Angeles, United States. 45 competitors, 31 men and 14 women, took part in 29 events in 9 sports.

== Medalists ==
=== Gold ===
- Jacques van Egmond — Cycling, Men's 1000m Sprint (Scratch)
- Charles Pahud de Mortanges — Equestrian, Three-Day Event Individual Competition

=== Silver ===
- Jacques van Egmond — Cycling, Men's 1000m Time Trial
- Aernout van Lennep, Karel Schummelketel, and Charles Pahud de Mortanges — Equestrian, Three-Day Event Team Competition
- Willy den Ouden — Swimming, Women's 100m Freestyle
- Corrie Laddé, Willy den Ouden, Puck Oversloot, and Marie Vierdag — Swimming, Women's 4 × 100 m Freestyle Relay
- Bob Maas — Sailing, Men's Monotype Class

== Cycling ==
Two cyclists, both men, represented the Netherlands in 1932.

Sprint

- Jacobus van Egmond

Time trial

- Jacobus van Egmond

Tandem

- Bernard Leene
- Jacobus van Egmond

== Fencing ==
Two fencers, one man and one woman, represented the Netherlands in 1932.

Men's foil

- Doris de Jong

Men's épée

- Doris de Jong

Men's sabre

- Doris de Jong

Women's foil

- Jo de Boer

== Modern pentathlon ==
One male pentathlete represented the Netherlands in 1932.

- Willem van Rhijn

== Swimming ==
Women

Athlete	Event	Heat		Semifinal		Final	
Athlete	Event	Time	Rank	Time	Rank	Time	Rank
Willy den Ouden	100 m freestyle	1:09.2	4 Q	1:07.6 OR	1 Q	1:07.8	2nd place, silver medalist(s)
Corrie Laddé	100 m freestyle	1:12.1	9 Q	1:11.8	8	Did not advance	
Maria Vierdag	100 m freestyle	1:13.3	12	Did not advance			
Marie Braun	400 m freestyle	5:50.5	4 Q	DNS		Did not advance	
Puck Oversloot	400 m freestyle	5:50.3	3 Q	DNS		Did not advance	
Marie Braun	100 m backstroke	—N/a		1:23.8	7 Q	DNS	
Puck Oversloot	100 m backstroke	—N/a		1:23.5	6	Did not advance	
Maria Vierdag; Puck Oversloot; Corrie Laddé; Willy den Ouden	4 × 100 m freestyle relay	—N/a				4:47.5	2nd place, silver medalist(s)
