= Laddé =

Laddé is a surname. Notable people with the surname include:

- M.H. Laddé (1866–1932), Dutch photographer and film director
- Corrie Laddé (1915–1996), Dutch swimmer
