= Helen Varcoe =

English swimmer (1907–1995)

Personal information
- Full name: Helen Gradwell Varcoe
- National team: Great Britain
- Born: 18 February 1907 Croydon, England
- Died: 7 May 1995 (aged 88) Truro, England

Sport
- Sport: Swimming
- Strokes: Freestyle
Medal record
Women's swimming
Representing Great Britain
Olympic Games
Bronze medal – third place	1932 Los Angeles	4×100 m freestyle

Helen Gradwell Varcoe (18 February 1907 – 7 May 1995), later known by her married name Helen Nicholls, was an English competitive swimmer who represented Great Britain at the 1932 Summer Olympics in Los Angeles. Varcoe won a bronze medal swimming the anchor leg for the British women's team in the 4×100-metre freestyle relay, together with her teammates Joyce Cooper, Valerie Davies and Edna Hughes. The British women finished third with a time of 4:52.4, behind the Americans (4:38.0) and Dutch (4:47.5), and ahead of the Canadians (5:05.7).

Varcoe was born in Croydon, London, and died in Truro, Cornwall.

== See also ==
- List of Olympic medalists in swimming (women)
