= Armando Barriguete =

Mexican equestrian

Personal information
- Full name: Armando Edmundo José Barriguete y San Germán
- Nationality: Mexican
- Born: 7 May 1901; Ocotlán de Morelos, Oaxaca, México

Sport
- Sport: Equestrian

Armando Edmundo José Barriguete y San Germán (born 7 May 1901) was a Mexican equestrian. He competed in the individual eventing at the 1932 Summer Olympics.
