= Yasushi Imamura =

Japanese equestrian

Personal information
- Nationality: Japanese
- Born: 30 January 1890

Sport
- Sport: Equestrian

Yasushi Imamura (born 30 January 1890, date of death unknown) was a Japanese equestrian. He competed in the individual jumping event at the 1932 Summer Olympics.
