= Helen Johns (swimmer) =

American swimmer (1914–2014)

Personal information
- Full name: Helen Eileen Johns
- National team: United States
- Born: September 25, 1914 East Boston, Massachusetts, U.S.
- Died: July 23, 2014 (aged 99) Sumter, South Carolina, U.S.

Sport
- Sport: Swimming
- Strokes: Freestyle
- Club: Brookline Women's Swimming Association; Boston Swimming Association
Medal record
Women's swimming
Representing the United States
Olympic Games
Gold medal – first place	1932 Los Angeles	4×100 m freestyle

Helen Eileen Johns (September 25, 1914 – July 23, 2014), later known by her married name Helen Carroll, was an American competition swimmer, Olympic champion, and former world record-holder.

== Career ==
Johns was born in East Boston, but grew up in nearby Medford, Massachusetts. At the 1932 Summer Olympics in Los Angeles, Johns represented the United States at the age of 17. She won a gold medal in the women's 4×100-meter freestyle relay with U.S. teammates Eleanor Garatti, Helene Madison and Josephine McKim. The American women set a new world record in the event with a time of 4:38.0, beating teams from the Netherlands (silver) and Great Britain (bronze) by nine and fourteen seconds, respectively.

In 1936 Johns graduated from Pembroke College, the former women's college of Brown University, with a bachelor's degree in psychology and economics. She later received her master's degree in special education.

Johns married Eugene Carroll in 1937 and moved to Swansea, Massachusetts wherein they had two daughters, Deborah and Judith. In 1957 they moved to Sumter, South Carolina.

In addition to coaching swimming, she became a special education teacher in the Sumter School District in Sumter, South Carolina in 1957 and retired from that position in 1980. In 1996 Johns carried the Olympic torch for a stretch in the Olympic torch relay for the 1996 Summer Olympics. She was inducted into the Rhode Island Heritage Hall of Fame for her achievements as an Olympic swimmer in 2004.

Johns died on July 23, 2014, at the age of 99, in Sumter.

== See also ==
- List of Olympic medalists in swimming (women)
- World record progression 4 × 100 metres freestyle relay
