= Ria van der Horst =

Dutch swimmer (born 1932)

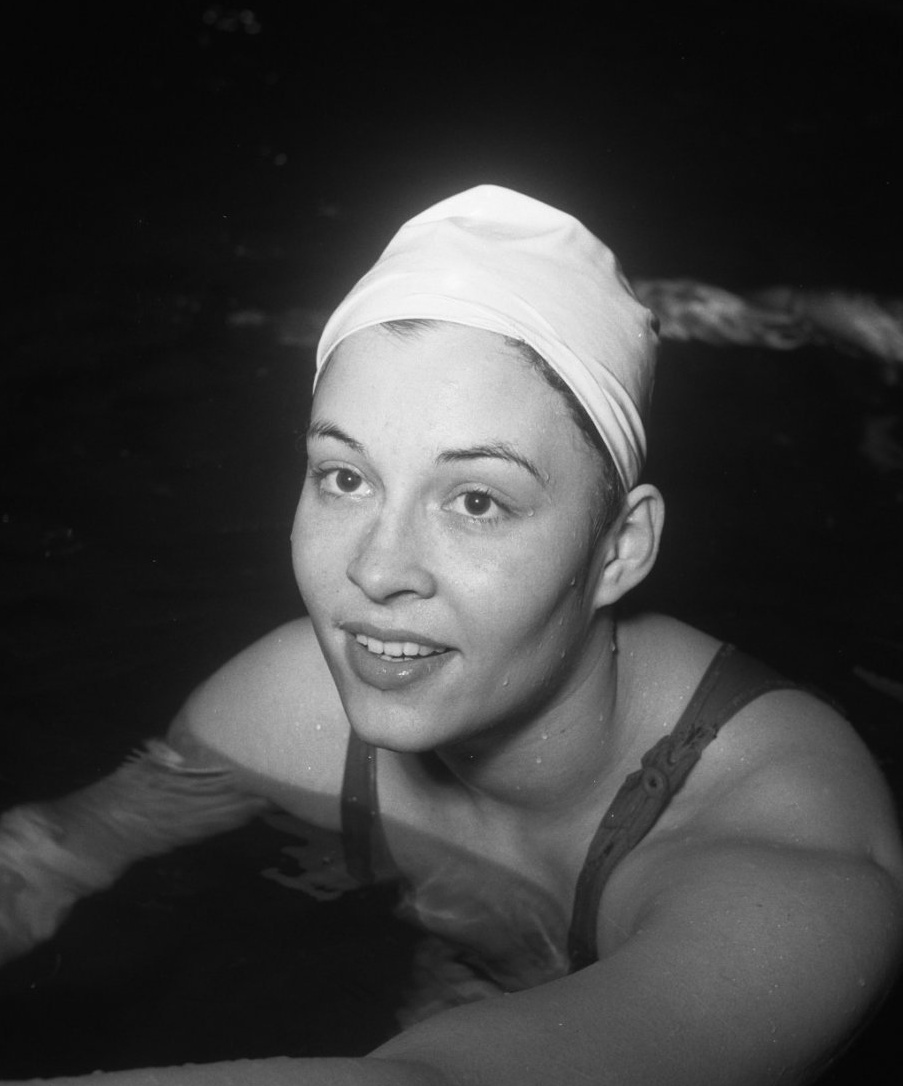
- Ria van der Horst in 1952

Personal information
- Full name: Hendrika Anna Maria van der Horst
- Born: 10 August 1932 (age 93) Rotterdam, the Netherlands

Sport
- Sport: Swimming
- Club: RDZ, Rotterdam
- Coach: Ma Braun
Medal record
Representing the Netherlands
European Championships
Gold medal – first place	1950 Vienna	100 m backstroke

Hendrika Anna Maria "Ria" van der Horst (born 10 August 1932) is a former Dutch backstroke swimmer who participated in the 1948 and 1952 Summer Olympics. In 1948, she was fifth in 100 m backstroke, and in 1952 she was disqualified for an incorrect turn. She won the gold medal in the same event at the 1950 European Aquatics Championships.
