= José Pérez Allende =

Mexican equestrian

Personal information
- Born: 19 March 1906 Oaxaca, Oaxaca, Mexico

Sport
- Sport: Equestrian

José Pérez Allende (born 19 March 1906, date of death unknown) was a Mexican equestrian. He competed in the individual eventing at the 1932 Summer Olympics. He won two gold medals and a silver at the Central American and Caribbean Games, and a gold medal at the 1955 Pan American Games.
