= Swimming at the 1932 Summer Olympics – Women's 4 × 100 metre freestyle relay =

Women's 1 × 100 metre freestyle relay at the Games of the X Olympiad
- Venue: LA84 Foundation/John C. Argue Swim Stadium
- Date: August 12, 1932 (final)
- Competitors: 20 from 5 nations
- Winning time: 4:38.0 WR

Medalists
1st place, gold medalist(s)		Josephine McKim, Helen Johns, Eleanor Saville, Helene Madison	United States
2nd place, silver medalist(s)		Maria Vierdag, Puck Oversloot, Corrie Laddé, Willy den Ouden	Netherlands
3rd place, bronze medalist(s)		Valerie Davies, Helen Varcoe, Joyce Cooper, Edna Hughes	Great Britain

The women's 4 × 100 metre freestyle relay was a swimming event held as part of the swimming at the 1932 Summer Olympics programme. It was the fifth appearance of the event, which was established in 1912. The competition was held on Friday, 12 August 1932. Twenty swimmers from five nations competed.

== Records ==
These were the standing world and Olympic records (in minutes) prior to the 1932 Summer Olympics.

World record	4:47.6	(United States) Adelaide Lambert (United States) Albina Osipowich (United States) Eleanor Garatti (United States) Martha Norelius	Amsterdam (NED)	9 August 1928
Olympic record	4:47.6	(United States) Adelaide Lambert (United States) Albina Osipowich (United States) Eleanor Garatti (United States) Martha Norelius	Amsterdam (NED)	9 August 1928

The United States set a new world record with 4:38.0 minutes.

== Results ==
As only five nations competed in this event there were no heats.

Final

Place	Swimmers	Time
1	Josephine McKim, Helen Johns, Eleanor Saville, and Helene Madison (USA)	4:38.0 WR
2	Maria Vierdag, Puck Oversloot, Corrie Laddé, and Willy den Ouden (NED)	4:47.5
3	Valerie Davies, Helen Varcoe, Joyce Cooper, and Edna Hughes (GBR)	4:52.4
4	Irene Pirie, Irene Mullen, Ruth Kerr, and Betty Edwards (CAN)	5:05.7
5	Kazue Kojima, Hatsuko Morioka, Misao Yokota, and Yukie Arata (JPN)	5:06.7 NR
