= Ma Braun =

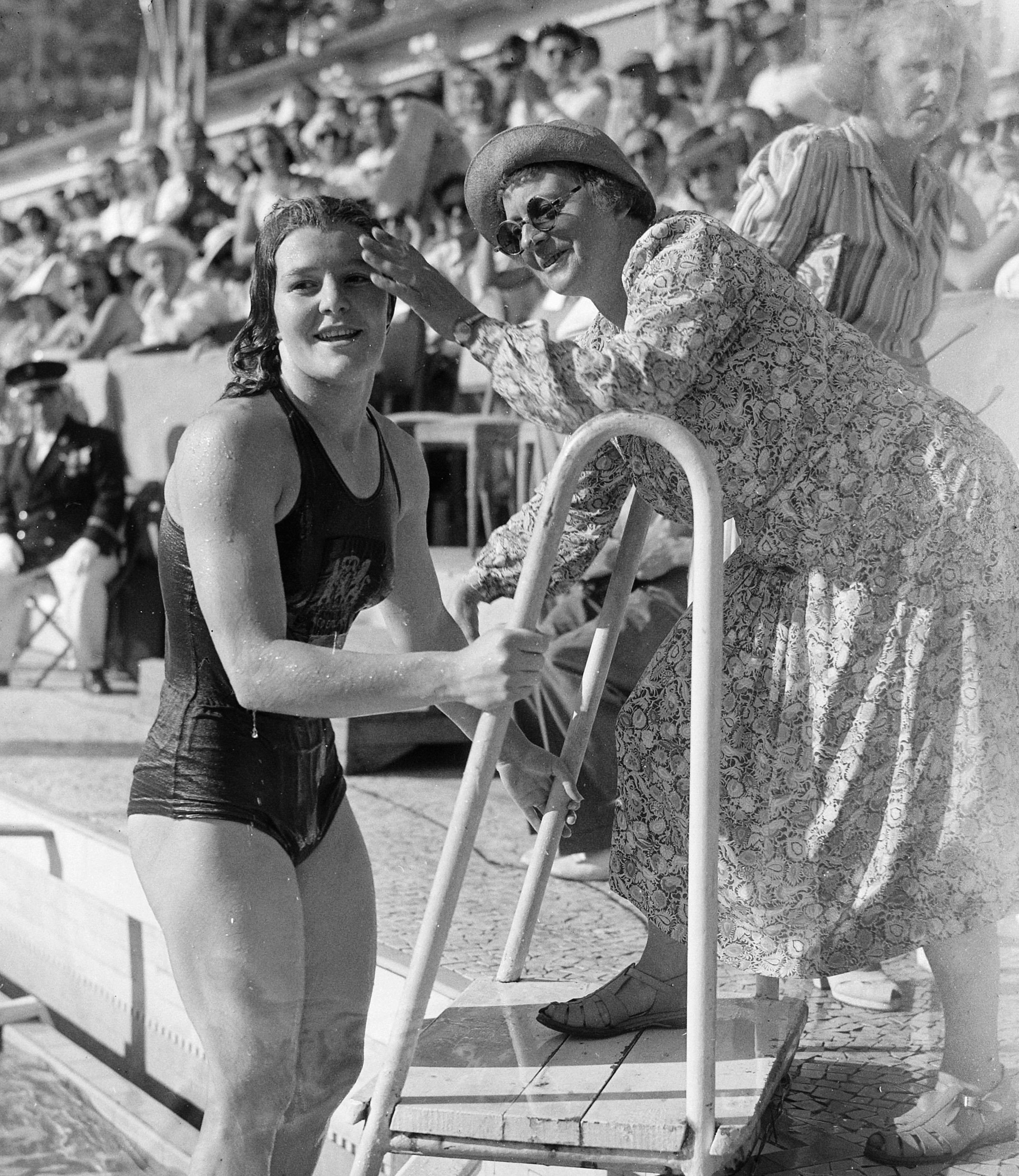
Ma Braun with Nel van Vliet at the 1947 European Aquatics Championships.

Maria Johanna "Ma" Braun (Delfshaven, 28 December 1881 – Rotterdam, 9 October 1956) was a Dutch swimming coach. She led the Dutch women's swimming team at the 1928–1952 Olympics and at the European championships in between, with her trainees winning medals at each of these competitions. Owing to her efforts, later supported by another prominent Dutch coach Jan Stender, the Netherlands was one of the leading women's swimming nations of the 1930s–1960s. Throughout her career Braun tried new strokes and training methods, and traveled throughout Europe to learn from competitors. In 1967 she was inducted into the International Swimming Hall of Fame.

Her trainees included Marie Baron, Willy den Ouden, Rie Mastenbroek, her daughter Marie Braun, Puck Oversloot, Ria van der Horst, Irma Schuhmacher and Jopie van Alphen. Her daughter won the 100 m backstroke at the 1928 Summer Olympics, and Mastenbroek remains the only woman to win both the 100 and 400 meter Olympic freestyle, which she had done in 1936.

== See also ==
- List of members of the International Swimming Hall of Fame
