= Morishige Yamamoto =

Japanese equestrian

Personal information
- Nationality: Japanese
- Born: 20 December 1882
- Died: 27 January 1962 (aged 79) Tokyo, Japan

Sport
- Sport: Equestrian

Morishige Yamamoto (20 December 1882 – 27 January 1962) was a Japanese equestrian. He competed in two events at the 1932 Summer Olympics.
