= Earl Foster Thomson =

American equestrian (1900–1971)

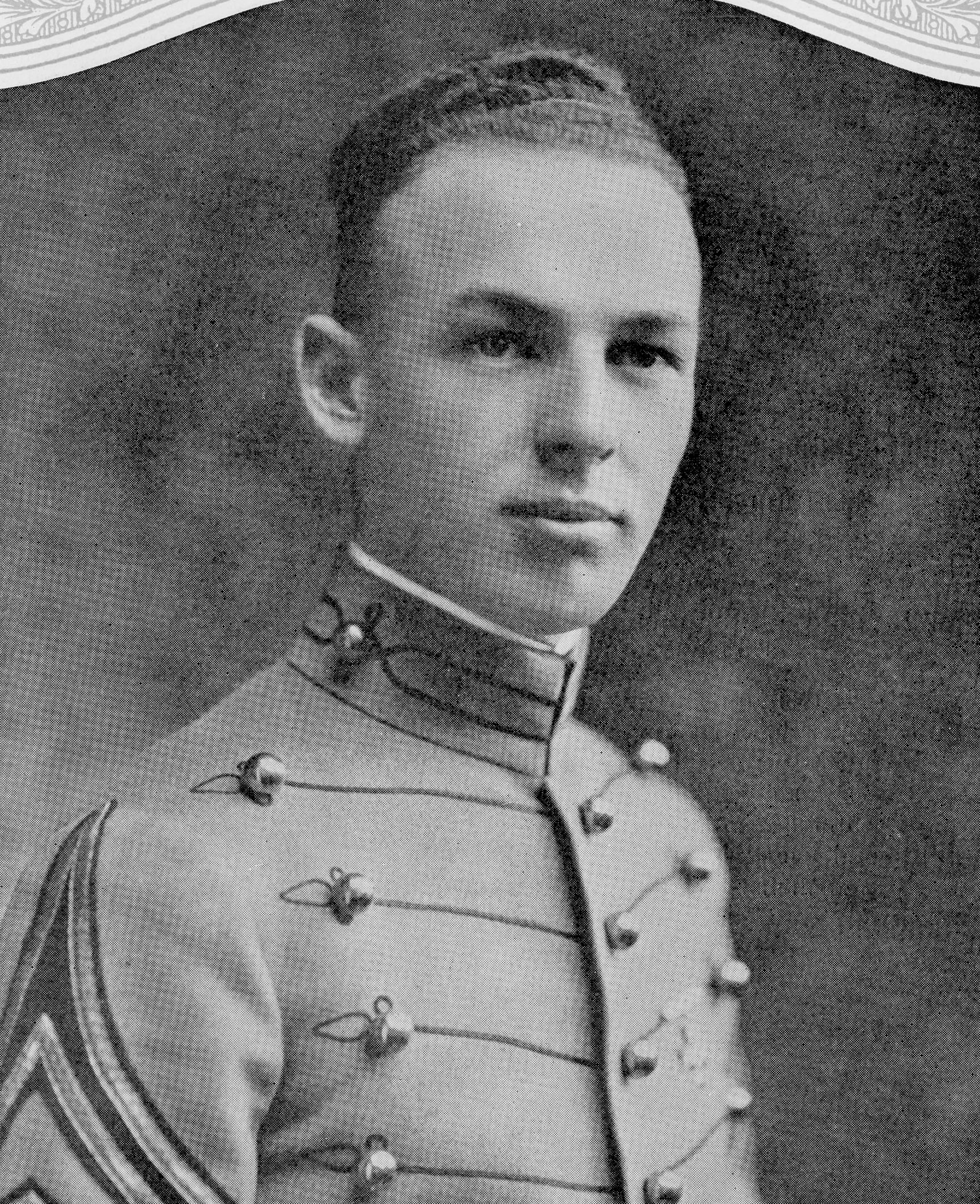
- At West Point in 1922

Medal record

Equestrian

Representing the United States

Olympic Games
Gold medal – first place	1932 Los Angeles	Team eventing
Gold medal – first place	1948 London	Team eventing
Silver medal – second place	1932 Los Angeles	Individual eventing
Silver medal – second place	1936 Berlin	Individual eventing
Silver medal – second place	1948 London	Team dressage

Lieutenant Earl "Tommy" Thomson (August 14, 1900 – July 5, 1971) was an American Olympic equestrian who won 5 medals during his international career.

== Biography ==
Thomson was born in Cleveland on August 14, 1900. Graduating from West Point in 1922, Thomson earned the Silver Star in World War II while he was serving as chief of staff to the 10th Mountain Division in Italy.

Trained under Harry Chamberlin, Thomson had an extremely successful equestrian Olympic career. He finished individually second, and won team gold, at his first Olympic competition in 1932.

At the 1936 Olympics, he won the team gold and individual silver in eventing on the legendary mare Jenny Camp, being one of the few riders, and the only American, to successfully negotiate the 4th obstacle on cross-country, a water jump. This obstacle included a 3' jump into the water and, for most of the competitors, they found that the footing on the bottom was slippery and it was much deeper than it looked. This obstacle created considerable controversy as the entire German team made it through, suggesting that the home team could have had prior knowledge regarding the footing.

In 1948, Thomson competed in the dressage competition with Pancraft to win the team silver (after the gold medal-winning Swedish team was disqualified due to one of its members being an enlisted man rather than an officer). This is, to-date, the highest team medal the US has won in a dressage competition. That same year, he finished with the team gold medal on Reno Rhythm.

He also served as the chef d'equipe for the eventing team at the 1960 Olympics in Rome, and was a judge at the 1952 Olympic Games.

Thomson died on July 5, 1971, at the age of 70.

== Sources ==
- Bryant, Jennifer O. Olympic Equestrian, A Century of International Horse Sport. Lexington, KY: Blood-Horse Publications, 2008
