= Carlos Mejia (equestrian) =

Mexican equestrian

Personal information
- Full name: Carlos Helario Mejia
- Born: 1894 Mexico City, Mexico
- Died: Unknown

Sport
- Sport: Equestrian

Carlos Helario Mejia (born 1894, date of death unknown) was a Mexican equestrian. He competed in two events at the 1932 Summer Olympics.
