= Tara Naro =

Japanese equestrian

Personal information
- Nationality: Japanese
- Born: 22 May 1896

Sport
- Sport: Equestrian

Tara Naro (born 22 May 1896, date of death unknown) was a Japanese equestrian. He competed in two events at the 1932 Summer Olympics.
