= Puck Oversloot =

Dutch swimmer (1914–2009)

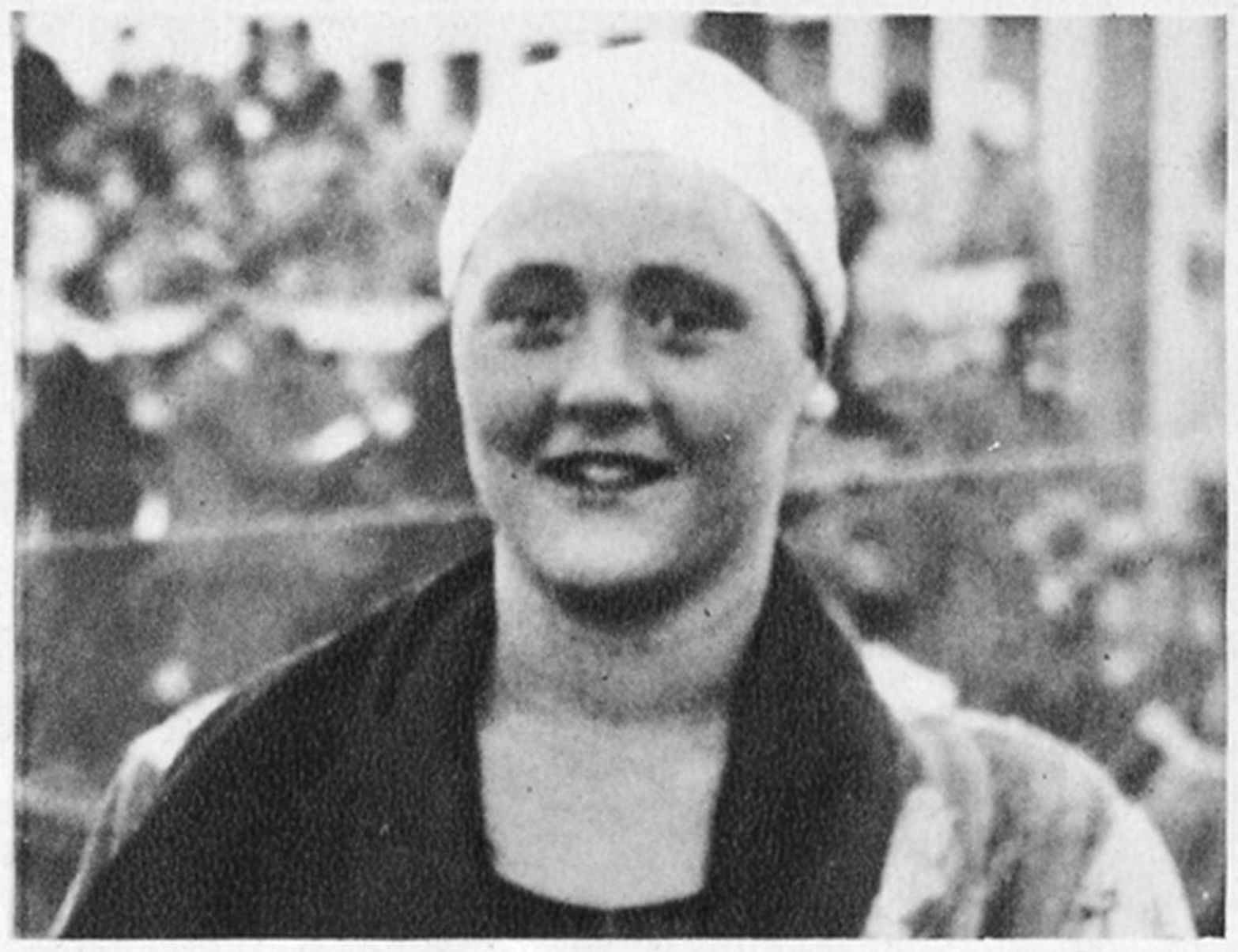
- Oversloot in 1932

Personal information
- Full name: Maria Petronella Oversloot
- Born: 22 May 1914 Rotterdam, Netherlands
- Died: 7 January 2009 (aged 94) Rotterdam, Netherlands
- Height: 1.70 m (5 ft 7 in)

Sport
- Sport: Swimming
- Club: ODZ, Rotterdam
- Coach: Ma Braun
Medal record
Representing the Netherlands
Olympic Games
Silver medal – second place	1932 Los Angeles	4×100 m freestyle
European Championships
Bronze medal – third place	1934 Magdeburg	100 m backstroke

Maria Petronella "Puck" Oversloot (22 May 1914 – 7 January 2009) was a Dutch swimmer. Together with Marie Braun, she was the top national backstroke and freestyle competitor. At the 1932 Summer Olympics, Braun was listed for the 4 × 100 m freestyle relay, but fell ill and was replaced by Oversloot. The team won a silver medal, setting a new European record. Both Braun and Oversloot qualified for the 400 m freestyle semifinals, but because Braun could not participate, Oversloot withdrew from the event, in solidarity.

In 1933, Oversloot broke the national record in the 100 m backstroke set by Braun and became the national champion. She won a bronze medal in the same event at the 1934 European Aquatics Championships.

She was born and died in Rotterdam.
