= John William Wofford =

American equestrian

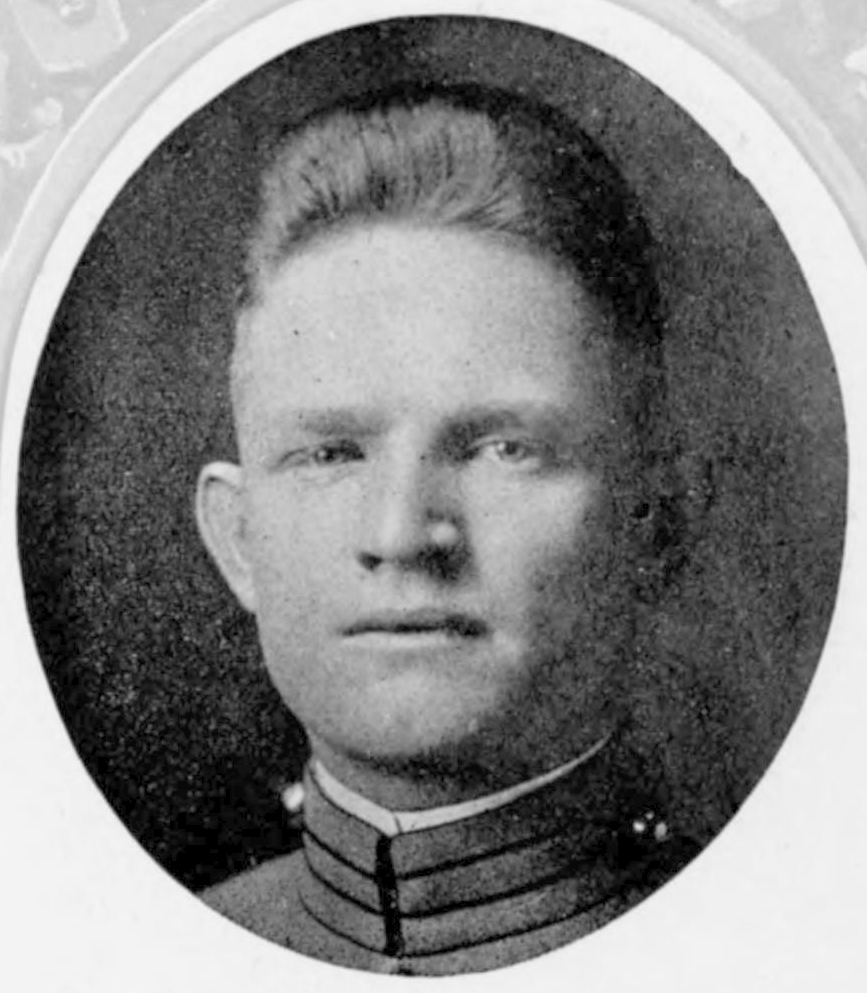
- At West Point in 1920

Personal information
- Born: January 1, 1898 High Point, North Carolina, U.S.
- Died: February 27, 1955 (aged 57) Rochester, Minnesota, U.S.

Sport
- Sport: Equestrian

John William Wofford (January 1, 1898 – February 27, 1955) was an American equestrian. He competed in two events at the 1932 Summer Olympics.

== Biography ==
John William Wofford was born in High Point, North Carolina on January 1, 1898. He moved to Laurens, South Carolina in his youth and graduated from Clemson University in 1918 with a degree in botany. He would go on to be the first Olympian to attend Clemson University.

He earned another degree from the United States Military Academy at West Point, graduating on June 15, 1920, and was commissioned as a 2nd lieutenant of infantry. He retired from the Army in 1943 with the rank of colonel.

He died from cancer at the Mayo Clinic in Rochester, Minnesota on February 27, 1955.
