= Charles Pahud de Mortanges =

Dutch equestrian

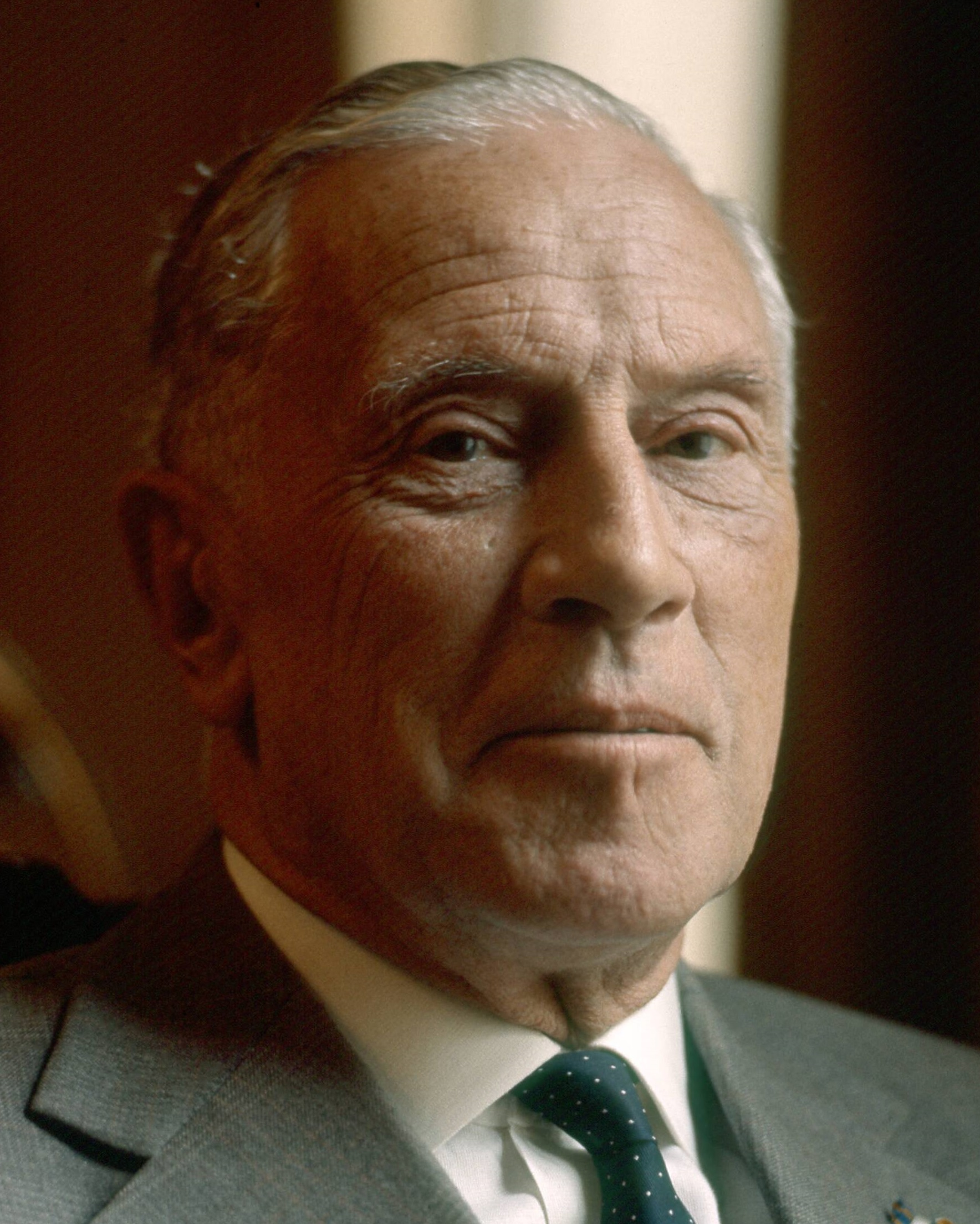
- Charles Pahud de Mortanges in 1964

Medal record

Equestrianism

Olympic Games

Representing the Netherlands
Gold medal – first place	1924 Paris	Team 3 day event
Gold medal – first place	1928 Amsterdam	Team 3 day event
Gold medal – first place	1928 Amsterdam	Individual 3 day event
Gold medal – first place	1932 Los Angeles	Individual 3 day event
Silver medal – second place	1932 Los Angeles	Team 3 day event

Charles Ferdinand Pahud de Mortanges (13 May 1896 in The Hague – 8 April 1971 in Leiden) was a Dutch horse rider who competed at the 1924, 1928, 1932 and 1936 Olympics and was the flag bearer for the Netherlands in 1932. He is only one of three equestrians (with Mark Todd and Michael Jung) to win two consecutive Olympic titles in the individual three-day event. Besides his riding achievements, de Mortanges was president or vice president of the National Olympic Committee (1946–1961) and a member of the International Olympic Committee (1946–1964). He was also a top commanding officer of the Royal Netherlands Motorized Infantry Brigade in 1944–1945 and later a senior army official overseeing the official ceremonies involving the Dutch royal family.

== Early life ==
De Mortanges was the son of Sophia Kol from the family of Bank Vlaer & Kol financiers and Charles Ferdinand Pahud de Mortanges, a military officer overseeing the Dutch colonies. He and his elder sister were raised by their mother after their father died in 1903. From an early age, de Mortanges was fascinated with horse riding and the military, and in 1915 he was accepted to the Royal Military Academy. After graduating with honors on 12 August 1918, he was assigned to The Hague regiment, where in 1919 he became a horse riding instructor. In 1922 he was noticed by K. F. Quarles van Ufford, who headed the sports section of the Dutch military. Van Ufford became his mentor and enlisted him to the riding school of the Dutch cavalry in Amersfoort, where de Mortanges later worked as an instructor between July 1925 and October 1927. In 1924 he was selected for the national Olympic team.

== Olympic career ==
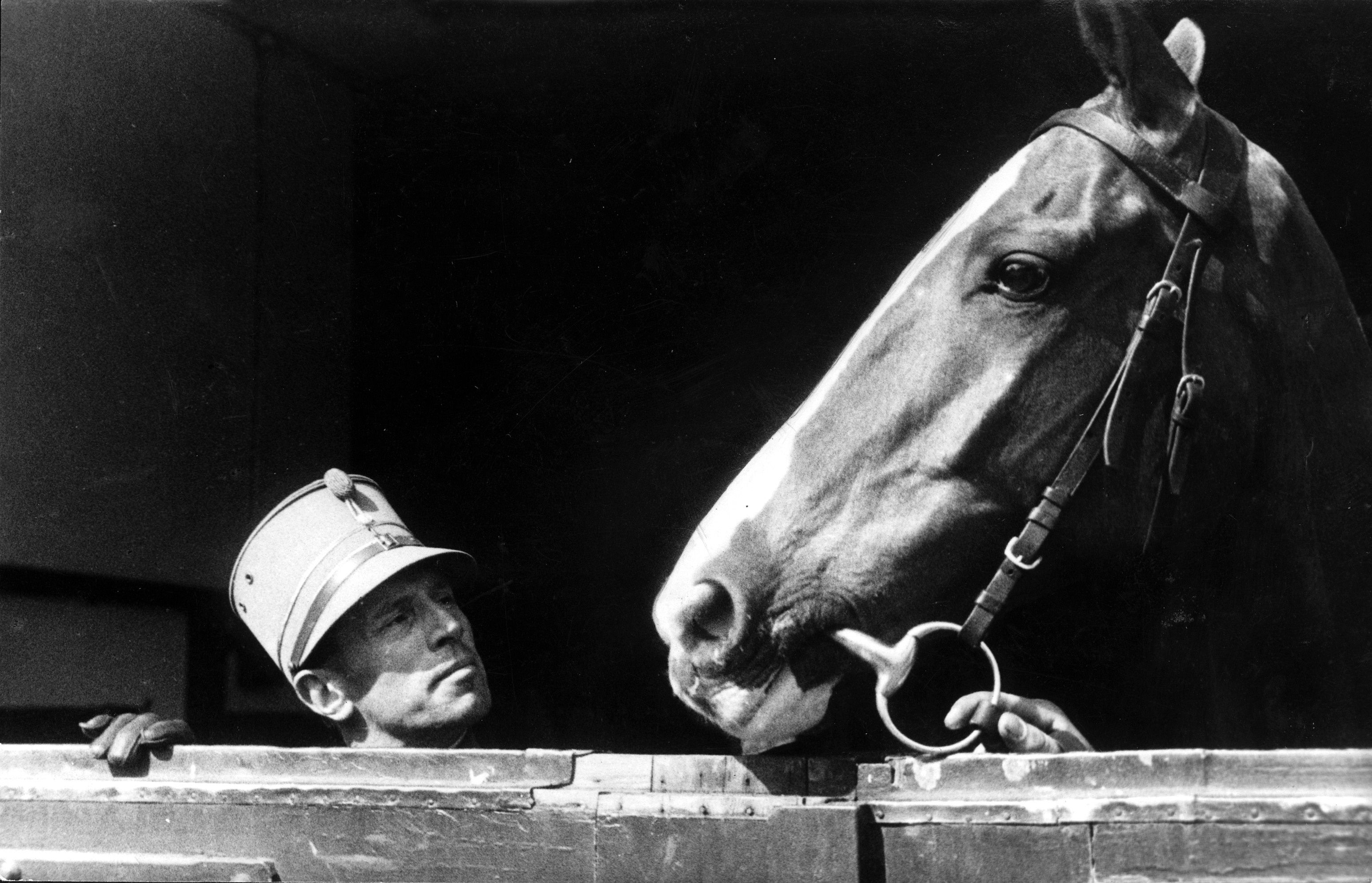
Pahud de Mortanges and Mädel (1936)

In 1924 de Mortanges won the gold medal in the team three-day event and placed fourth in the individual three-day event.

Four years later he won the gold medals in the team three-day event as well as in the individual three-day event.

In 1932 he won again the gold medal in the individual three-day event and the silver medal in the team three-day event.

At the 1936 Summer Olympics he finished out of medals at the individual and team three-day events.

== Later life ==
Besides the Olympics, between 1924 and 1936 de Mortanges took part in various international competitions and acted as a riding instructor with the Dutch cavalry. In 1938 he severely injured his right wrist in a riding accident, which halted his military and riding career. In 1942 he became a German prisoner of war. He escaped in Summer 1943 during a train transfer, and, after traveling through the occupied Belgium and France and through Spain and Portugal to Gibraltar, in February 1944 was flown to England. The same year, upon advice of his admirer Prince Bernhard, de Mortanges became a leading officer of the Royal Netherlands Motorized Infantry Brigade and later participated in the Normandy landings and liberation of the Netherlands.

After the war de Mortanges returned to sport events. On 6 July 1946 he became president of the Dutch Olympic Committee, and remained in this position until 7 April 1961, with a break between 1951 and 1958 when he acted as a vice-president. He was also a member of the International Olympic Committee between 4 September 1946 and 7 October 1964. In parallel, upon recommendation of Prince Bernhard, he acted as Inspector General of the Royal Army (1946–1953). In 1953 after promotion to brigadier general he became vice-head and then head of the Royal Military House, where he was responsible for the organization of ceremonies involving the Dutch royal family until his retirement in December 1961.

During his late years de Mortanges suffered from rheumatism and became eventually unable to walk. He died in 1971 at the Leiden University Hospital.

== Family ==
On 16 December 1920 de Mortanges married Irma Clara baroness Snouckaert van Schauburg. They had one son, who was executed by the German military after a failed attempt to cross the Franco-Swiss border in 1942. After a divorce on 4 July 1949, on 23 July 1949 de Mortanges married Theresia Gijsbertha Bernardina Daamen.

Olympic Games
Preceded by Sam Olij	Flagbearer for Netherlands; Los Angeles 1932	Succeeded by Rein de Waal
