= Procopio Ortíz =

Mexican equestrian

Personal information
- Nationality: Mexican
- Born: 8 July 1904
- Died: 12 January 1980 (aged 75)

Sport
- Sport: Equestrian

Procopio Ortíz (8 July 1904 – 12 January 1980) was a Mexican equestrian. He competed in two events at the 1932 Summer Olympics.
