= Andrés Bocanegra =

Mexican equestrian

Personal information
- Nationality: Mexican
- Born: 30 November 1900
- Died: 27 May 1973 (aged 72)

Sport
- Sport: Equestrian

Andrés Bocanegra (30 November 1900 – 27 May 1973) was a Mexican equestrian. He competed in two events at the 1932 Summer Olympics.
