= Shunzo Kido =

Japanese equestrian

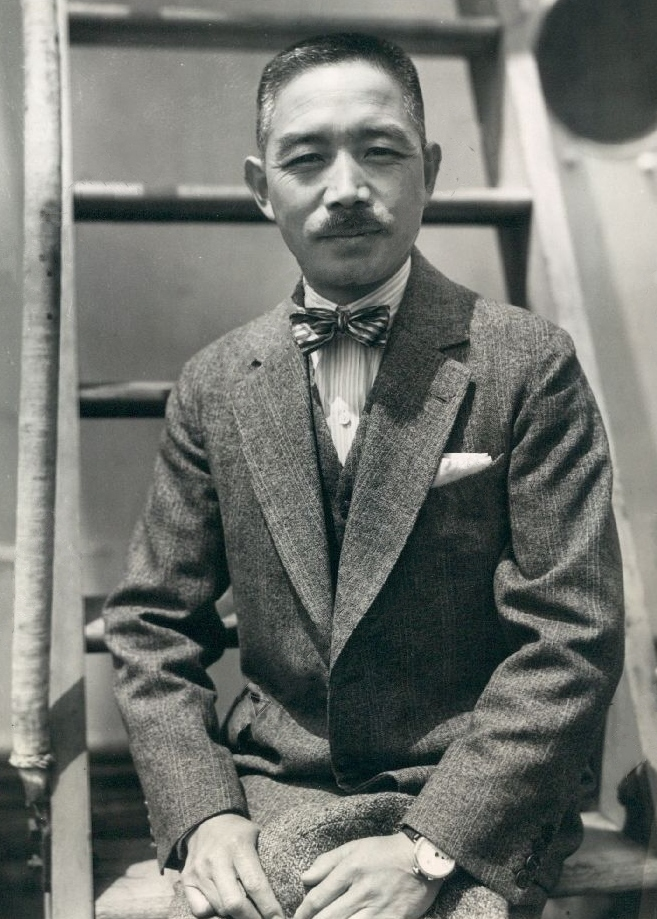
- Kido in 1932

Personal information
- Born: July 4, 1889 Miyagi Prefecture, Japan
- Died: October 3, 1986 (aged 97)

Sport
- Sport: Equestrian
- Event: Eventing

Shunzo Kido (城戸 俊三, July 4, 1889 – October 3, 1986) was a Japanese equestrian who competed in eventing at the 1928 and 1932 Summer Olympics. In 1932, while leading the tournament with one jump left, he felt that his horse became lame and dismounted to save her from potential injury, abandoning his chances for a medal.
