= Corrie Laddé =

Dutch swimmer (1915–1996)

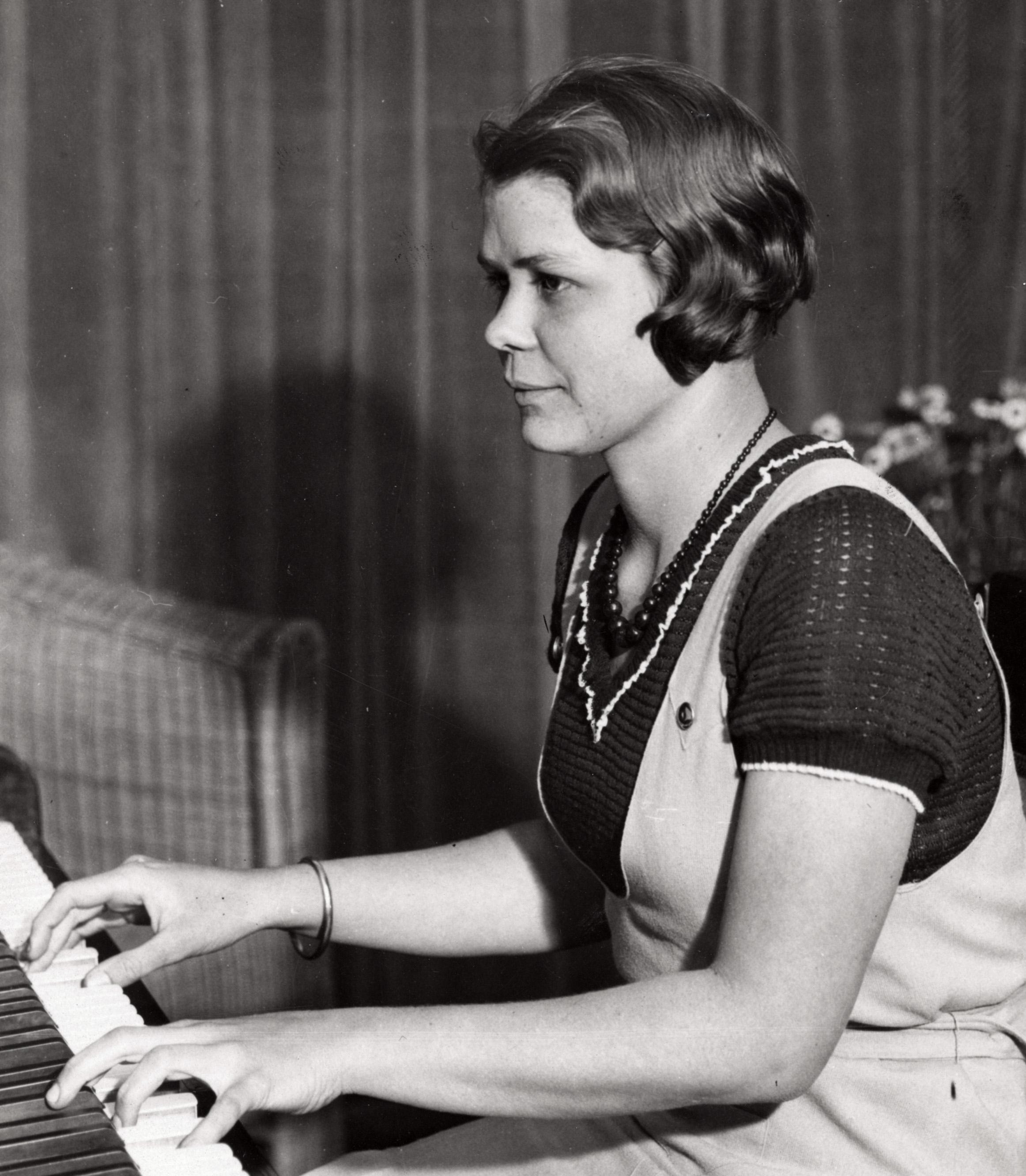
- Corrie Laddé in 1932

Personal information
- Born: October 27, 1915 Batavia, Dutch East Indies
- Died: September 18, 1996 (aged 80) Bad Ischl, Austria

Sport
- Sport: Swimming
Medal record
Representing Netherlands
Olympic Games
Silver medal – second place	1932 Los Angeles	4x100 m freestyle

Cornelia "Corrie" Laddé (27 October 1915 – 18 September 1996) was a Dutch swimmer who competed in the 1932 Summer Olympics.

In the 1932 Olympics she won a silver medal in the 4 × 100 m freestyle relay event. She was also fourth in the semifinal of the 100 m freestyle event and did not advance.

She was born in Batavia, Dutch East Indies and died in Bad Ischl, Austria.
