= Edwin Argo =

American equestrian

Olympic medal record

Men's equestrian

Representing the United States
| Gold medal – first place | 1932 Los Angeles | Team eventing |

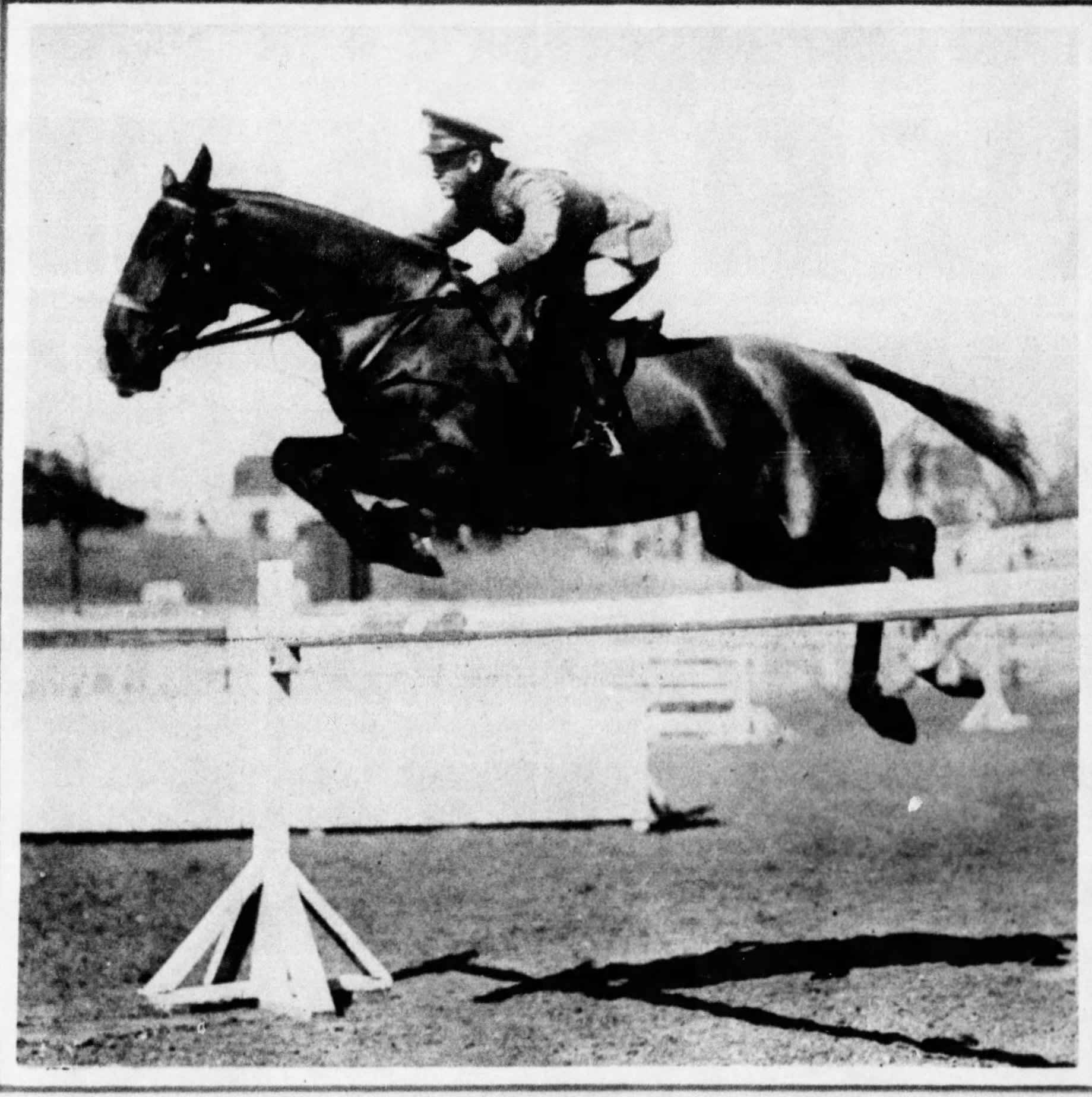
Argo in 1929

Edwin "Ed" Yancey Argo (September 22, 1895 – March 10, 1962) was an American horse rider who competed in the 1932 Summer Olympics.

== Early life and education ==
Argo was born in Hollis, Alabama, on September 22, 1895. He majored in electrical engineering from Alabama Polytechnic Institute.

== Career ==
In 1932, Argo participated in 1932 Summer Olympics, finishing 8th with his horse Honolulu Tomboy.

== Military service ==
He received an appointment to the U.S. Military Academy at West Point, New York, and started school there in 1915. When World War One began, he dropped out of school and enlisted in the Army as a private on May 12, 1917. After the war, in 1919, he returned to the Military Academy and graduated as a second lieutenant.

Argo was a field artillery officer in the U.S. Army at a time that the horse was as prominent a part of a successful unit as in a cavalry unit. In 1921, he married Marguerite Hughes of Texas and was transferred to the 8th Training Battery from the 82nd Field Artillery. In 1925, he was stationed at Fort Sill, Oklahoma, which was the home of the U.S. Army School of Fires. In 1928, he was selected to the military equestrian team that took part in a competition in Amsterdam, Netherlands. He returned to Europe in 1930 for the competition in Hamburg, Germany.

Argo continued his Army career long after his Olympic glory days. He was transferred to Fort Humphreys, D.C., on April 20, 1939, and promoted to major a few months later. He then served at Fort Riley, Kansas, and Camp Beauregard, Louisiana. Argo was promoted to lieutenant colonel at Camp Beauregard on April 20, 1941, and to full colonel soon after — February 1, 1942.

Argo retired after 27 years military service on December 31, 1944 as a colonel. and took up residence in Louisiana. He died in Shreveport, Louisiana, at the age of 66 on March 10, 1962.
