= Jenny Camp =

- Breed: Thoroughbred, with some Standardbred blood
- Sire: Gordon Russell (Thoroughbred)
- Grandsire: Marchmont (Thoroughbred)
- Sex: Mare
- Foaled: 1926 at Front Royal, Virginia Remount Depot
- Colour: Bay, white coronary on the left front

Olympic medal record

Equestrian
Gold medal – first place	1932 Los Angeles	Eventing team
Silver medal – second place	1932 Los Angeles	Eventing ind.
Silver medal – second place	1936 Berlin	Eventing ind.

Jenny Camp was a famous horse that competed in the sport of eventing.

Jenny Camp is possibly the most famous US army-bred horse. Her sire, the Thoroughbred Gordon Russell, was well known for his jumping ability, although her dam was of unknown breeding (thought to be part-Thoroughbred, part-Standardbred). Gordon Russell also produced the 1952 bronze medal-winning jumper Democrat. She was poorly conformed, being short-gaited with upright front pasterns, but was found to be very brave and agile. Due to her small size, 15.3 hands (63 inches, 160 cm), she was first used as a polo pony; when her jumping prowess was discovered, she was sent to be part of the three-day team.

The small mare was ridden by the great Captain Earl F. Thomson in two Olympics: the 1932 Los Angeles Games and the 1936 Berlin Games. She had great success, winning the individual silver medals at both Olympics as well as the team gold at the 1932 Games. This record makes her one of only three horses to win medals at consecutive Olympic Games; the others being Mark Todd's (NZ) Charisma and Marcroix, ridden by Holland's Lt. Charles F. Pahud de Mortanges.

Following her career, she was transferred to the Remount Depot at Fort Robinson to be bred.

== Pedigree ==
Pedigree of Jenny Camp
Sire Gordon Russell 1910	Marchmont; 1900	Martagon; 1887	Bend Or - 1877
Sire Gordon Russell 1910	Marchmont; 1900	Martagon; 1887	Tiger Lily - 1875
Sire Gordon Russell 1910	Marchmont; 1900	Primavera; 1881	Springfield - 1873
Sire Gordon Russell 1910	Marchmont; 1900	Primavera; 1881	Opaline - 1872
Sire Gordon Russell 1910	Tokalon; 1901	Tammany; 1889	Iroquois - 1878
Sire Gordon Russell 1910	Tokalon; 1901	Tammany; 1889	Tullahoma - 1880
Sire Gordon Russell 1910	Tokalon; 1901	Enid; 1889	Sir Modred - 1877
Sire Gordon Russell 1910	Tokalon; 1901	Enid; 1889	Miss Motley - 1884
Dam u/k			
