= Karel Schummelketel =

Dutch equestrian

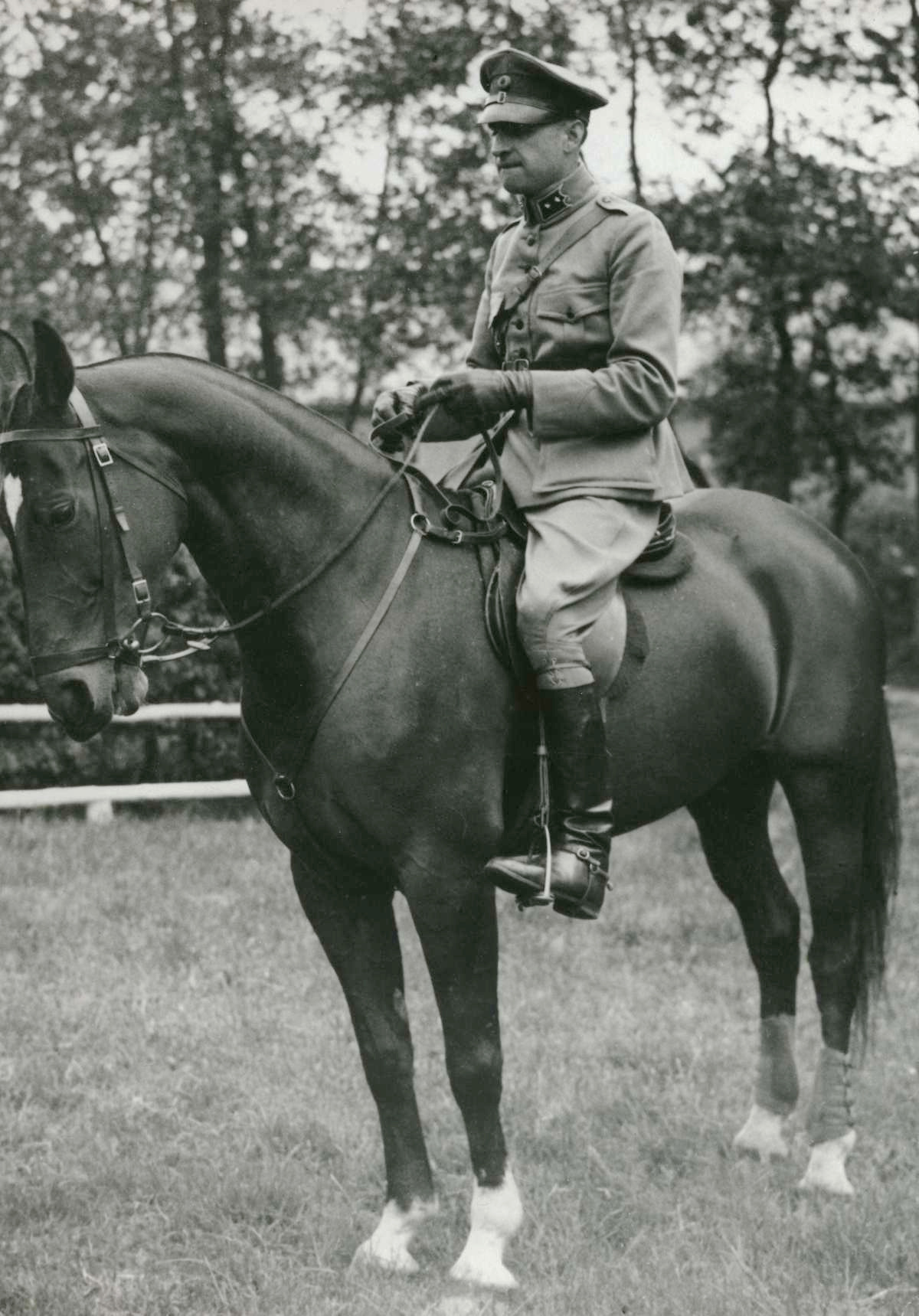
- Karel Schummelketel in 1932

Personal information
- Born: 24 September 1897 Breda, the Netherlands
- Died: 8 January 1981 (aged 83) Harderwijk, the Netherlands

Sport
- Sport: Horse riding
Medal record
Representing the Netherlands
Olympic Games
| Silver medal – second place | 1932 Los Angeles | Team eventing |

Karel Johan Schummelketel (24 September 1897 – 8 January 1981) was a Dutch horse rider. He competed in eventing at the 1932 Summer Olympics and won a team silver medal, finishing sixth individually.

Schummelketel graduated from the Cadet School in Alkmaar and from the Koninklijke Militaire Academie (KMA) in his hometown of Breda. Between 1920 and 1928 he served as a cavalry lieutenant and adjutant in the Dutch East Indies, and later became a riding instructor at KMA. He returned to the Dutch East Indies in the late 1930s, and was held there as a prisoner of war during World War II. In 1950 he returned to the Netherlands, and later founded and headed (in 1969–72) the Dutch Equestrian Centre (NHB) in Deurne.
