= Ernst Hallberg =

Swedish equestrian

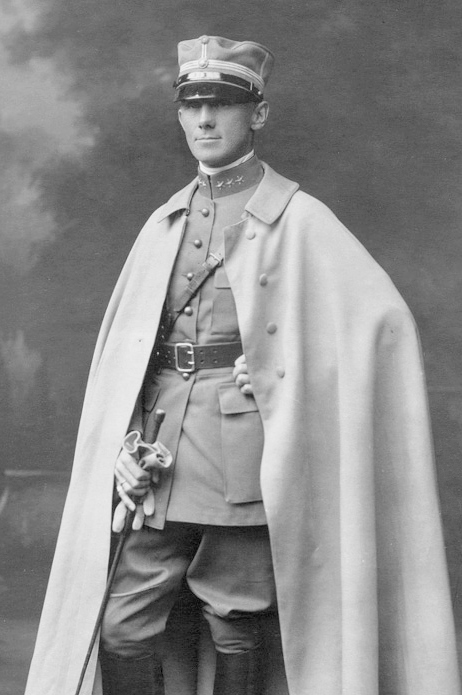

Personal information
- Born: 5 January 1894 Falkenberg, Sweden
- Died: 28 April 1944 (aged 50) Klippan, Skåne, Sweden

Sport
- Sport: Horse riding
- Club: K5 IF, Helsingborg; K2 IF, Helsingborg
Medal record
Representing Sweden
Olympic Games
Bronze medal – third place	1928 Amsterdam	Team jumping

Ernst Johan Emanuel Hallberg (5 January 1894 – 28 April 1944) was a Swedish Army officer and horse rider who competed in the 1928 and 1932 Summer Olympics. In 1928 he and his horse Loke finished 25th in the individual jumping and won a bronze medal with the Swedish jumping team. Four years later he finished fifth in the individual jumping on Kornett and in the individual eventing on Marokan.

Hallberg was major in the Swedish Army.
