= Harry Chamberlin =

Equestrian and Army U.S. Army brigadier general

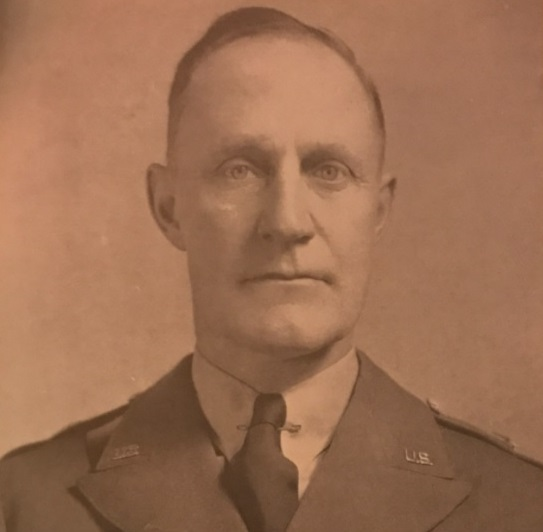
- Chamberlin as commander of the 4th Cavalry Brigade at Camp Funston in 1941
- Born: May 19, 1887; Elgin, Illinois
- Died: September 29, 1944 (aged 57); San Francisco, California
- Burial place: Post Cemetery, Presidio of Monterey, California
- Spouse(s): Sally Garlington (m. 1912–1933, divorced); Helen Elena Bradman (m. 1933–1944, his death)
- Children: 2
- Relatives: Ernest Albert Garlington (father-in-law)
- Military career
- Allegiance: United States
- Branch: United States Army
- Service years: 1910–1944
- Rank: Brigadier General
- Service number: O-2848
- Unit: Cavalry Branch
- Commands: 1st Squadron, 8th Cavalry Regiment; 1st Squadron, 14th Cavalry Regiment; 10th Forestry District, Civilian Conservation Corps; 2nd Cavalry Regiment; Cavalry Replacement Center, Fort Riley; 4th Cavalry Brigade, 2nd Cavalry Division; New Hebrides Task Force; Southwestern Security District; Fort Ord
- Conflicts: Moro Rebellion; Pancho Villa Expedition; World War I World War II
- Awards: Military Cross (Belgium)

Signature
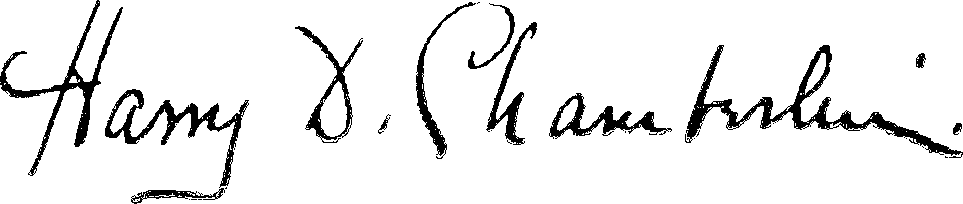

Olympic medal record

Equestrian

Representing the United States
Gold medal – first place	1932 Los Angeles	Team eventing
Silver medal – second place	1932 Los Angeles	Individual show jumping

Harry Dwight Chamberlin (May 19, 1887 – September 29, 1944) was a career officer in the United States Army. A veteran of the Moro Rebellion, Pancho Villa Expedition, World War I, and World War II, he attained the rank of brigadier general, and was most notable for his command of several Cavalry units, including 1st Squadron, 8th Cavalry Regiment, 1st Squadron, 14th Cavalry Regiment, 2nd Cavalry Regiment, the Cavalry Replacement Center at Fort Riley, and 4th Cavalry Brigade, 2nd Cavalry Division. During World War II, he commanded the New Hebrides Task Force, Southwestern Security District, and Fort Ord.

Chamberlin was also a notable equestrian, and participated in several Olympic games. His most noteworthy success came in 1932, when the U.S. contingent won the gold medal in team eventing and Chamberlin won the silver medal in individual show jumping.

== Early life ==
Harry D. Chamberlin was born in Elgin, Illinois on May 19, 1887, the son of Cora L. (Orth) Chamberlin and Dwight A. Chamberlin, a longtime member of the Kane County Board of Supervisors. He attended the schools of Elgin and graduated from Elgin High School in 1905. From 1905 to 1906, Chamberlin was a student at the Elgin Academy.

Chamberlin was appointed to the United States Military Academy in 1906. While at West Point, Chamberlin was a member of the track and boxing teams, played halfback on the football team, and was his class representative to the student athletic council. A highlight of Chamberlin's football career was his pickup of a fumbled Navy punt and 92-yard return during the 1908 Army–Navy game, which set up his three-yard run for the touchdown that enabled Army's 6–4 victory.

In 1910, Chamberlin graduated and was ranked 29th of 83. He received his commission as a second lieutenant of Cavalry and was assigned to the 7th Cavalry Regiment.

== Start of career ==
Chamberlin served with the 7th Cavalry at Fort Riley, Kansas until 1911, when the regiment was posted to Fort William McKinley, Philippines during the Moro Rebellion. In 1914, Chamberlin returned to the United States and was assigned to the 5th Cavalry Regiment at Fort Sheridan, Illinois. Later that year, he was posted to Fort Riley's Mounted Service School. Chamberlin completed the school's first and second year courses, and remained at Fort Riley until March 1916.

After graduating from the Mounted Service School, Chamberlin returned to the 5th Cavalry, which he joined in Columbus, New Mexico. He remained in the Columbus area until August as part of the U.S. military's Pancho Villa Expedition. He was promoted to first lieutenant in July 1916. In October 1916, Chamberlin was assigned to West Point as an instructor in the Department of Tactics. In May 1917, he received promotion to captain.

== World War I ==
In June 1918, Chamberlin was assigned to the 152d Depot Brigade at Camp Upton, New York and promoted to temporary major. In July, he was appointed adjutant of the 161st Infantry Brigade, a unit of the 81st Division. After training in France during the summer of 1918, the 81st Division was assigned to the front lines near Saint-Dié-des-Vosges in September 1918. In November, Chamberlin's brigade was assigned to the front lines in the Sommedieue sector, where it remained until the end of the war.

After the war, Chamberlin remained in France as an instructor at First United States Army's School for the Care of Animals. From February to March 1919, he was inspector of animal transportation on the First Army staff. In March and April, Chamberlin carried out an inspection trip in England, France, Belgium, and Germany, on which he visited British cavalry regiments and remount depots to learn their animal care techniques. He was promoted to temporary lieutenant colonel in April 1919.

== Post-World War I ==
During the spring of 1919, Chamberlin trained in Koblenz prior to participating in the Inter-Allied Games, which took place in Paris that summer. Chamberlin was a member of the U.S. equestrian team, and placed second in the individual championship. In August 1919, he was assigned as an instructor at the Cavalry School and posted to Fort Riley. In September, he was returned to his permanent rank of captain.

In 1920, Chamberlin was a member of the U.S. equestrian team that took part in the Olympic Games which were held in Antwerp, Belgium. He participated in both the Three Day Event, a military competition and the Prix de Nations (Prize of Nations), an individual show jumping contest. In July 1920, Chamberlin was promoted to major.

== Continued career ==
After the 1920 Olympics, Chamberlin continued on the staff of the Cavalry School until 1922, when he was selected to attend the Saumur Cavalry School in France. After graduating in early 1923, he enrolled in the Italian Cavalry School at Tor di Quinto, where he completed the program of instruction in late 1923. While in Italy, he was introduced to the forward seat, which became knows as the 'Chamberlin seat' in America and which now dominates hunter and jumper equestrian events. During his return to the United States, Chamberlin spent time in England during 1924 as an observer at the Army School of Equitation, Weedon.

From 1925 to 1926, Chamberlin commanded 1st Squadron, 8th Cavalry Regiment at Fort Bliss, Texas. Chamberlin was an accomplished polo player and was captain of the Army team that won the U.S. Junior Championship in 1926. From 1926 to 1927, Chamberlin attended the United States Army Command and General Staff College, and he completed the course as an honor graduate. After graduating, he was assigned to the 9th Cavalry Regiment at Fort Riley. In 1927, he trained the 1928 Olympic Team, which he captained. Chamberlin finished 21st in the event competition and 18th individually in the jumping competition. Overall, the U.S. team placed 8th of 16.

From 1929 to 1932, Chamberlin was captain of the U.S. equestrian team. He competed at the 1932 Olympic Games, again as a member of the event and jumping teams. In the eventing competition, he finished fourth, while the U.S. team was first overall and won its first-ever gold medal. Chamberlin finished second in the individual jumping event and won the silver medal.

== Later career ==
Chamberlin attended the United States Army War College from 1932 to 1933. After graduating, he was assigned to command 1st Squadron, 14th Cavalry Regiment at Fort Sheridan, Illinois and the Civilian Conservation Corps' Wisconsin-based 10th Forestry District. In November 1934, Chamberlin was promoted to lieutenant colonel. From 1936 to 1938, he was assistant chief of staff for operations, plans, and training (G-3) on the staff of the 1st Cavalry Division. From 1938 to 1939, he was the division's chief of staff, and in 1939, Chamberlin received promotion to colonel.

As the United States prepared for entry into World War II, Chamberlin commanded the 2nd Cavalry Regiment at Fort Riley from 1939 to 1941. In April 1941, he was promoted to brigadier general. From 1941 to 1942, Chamberlin commanded the 4th Cavalry Brigade at Fort Riley.

In 1942, Chamberlin commanded the combined services task force which occupied New Hebrides and defended the islands against attack from Japan. While serving in the Pacific theater, Chamberlin was taken ill and returned to California. Doctors attempted to treat Chamberlin as he commanded first the Southwestern Security District and later Fort Ord, but his illness proved to be terminal.

== Death and burial ==
Chamberlin died at the Presidio of San Francisco's Letterman Army Hospital on September 29, 1944. He was buried at the Presidio of Monterey, California's post cemetery.

== Career as author ==
Chamberlin was the author of several books on horsemanship and horse training, including: Riding and Schooling Horses (1934); Training Hunters, Jumpers, and Hacks (1939); and Breaking, Training and Reclaiming Cavalry Horses (1941).

== Family ==
In 1912, Chamberlin married Sally Garlington, the daughter of Ernest Albert Garlington. They divorced in 1933, and later that year Chamberlin married Helen Elena Bradman, the daughter of U.S. Marine Corps Brigadier General Frederic L. Bradman. With his second wife, Chamberlin was the father of two children, Lydia and Frederika.

During World War II, Sally Garlington Chamberlin was employed as General George C. Marshall's private secretary. Chamberlin's sister Marie E. Chamberlin was the wife of Army officer John Gray Thornell, who was killed while piloting the dirigible Roma in 1922 when it crashed in Norfolk, Virginia.

== Legacy ==
Fort Ord's Chamberlin Library, which was opened in 1970, is named for Harry Chamberlin and continues to serve as the library of the Monterey Peninsula's military community. Chamberlin was inducted into the United States Show Jumping Hall of Fame in 1990. In 2006, he was inducted into the Elgin Sports Hall of Fame.
