= Aernout van Lennep =

Dutch equestrian (1898–1974)

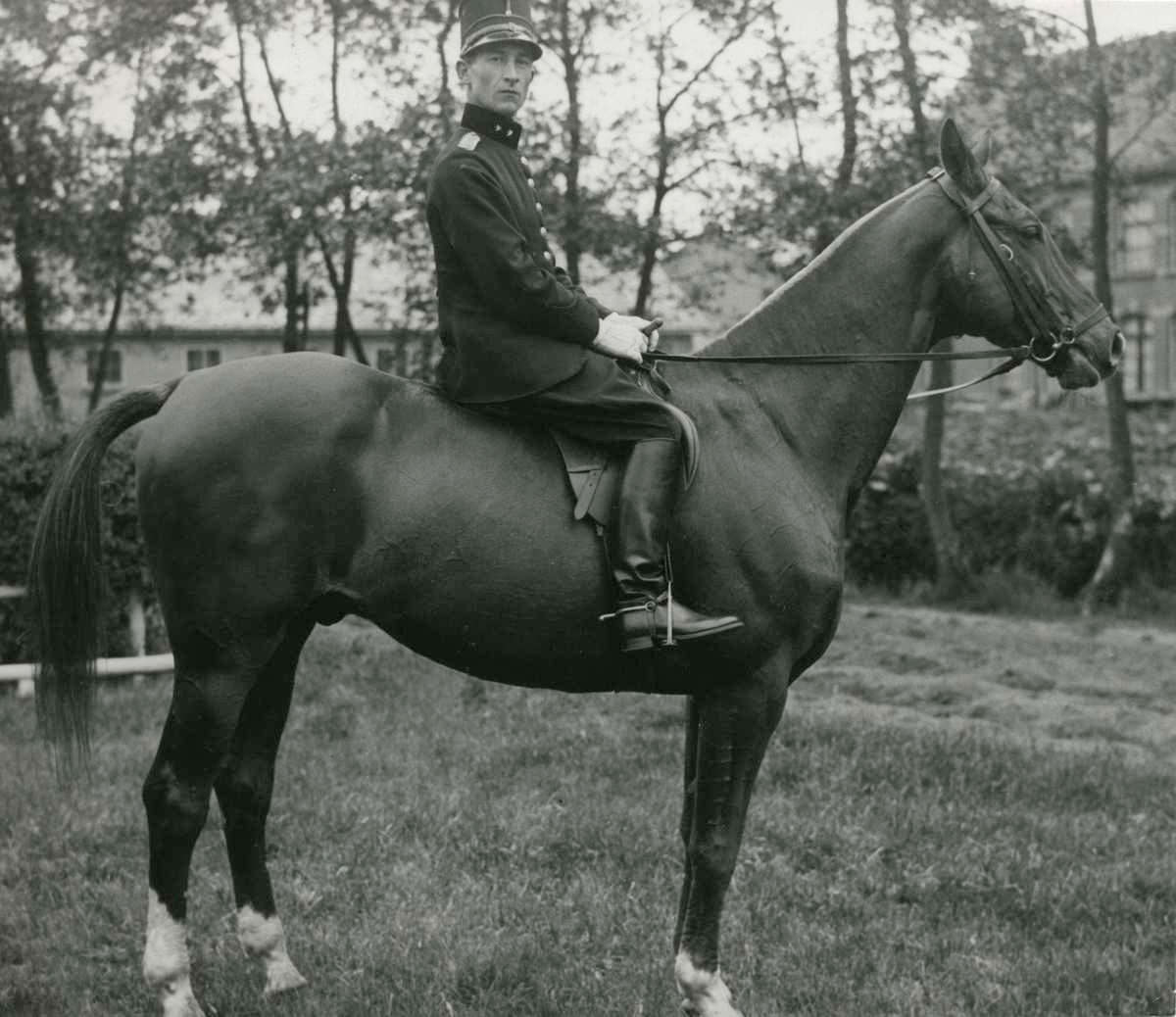
- Aernout van Lennep in 1932

Personal information
- Born: 23 February 1898 Den Helder, the Netherlands
- Died: 17 December 1974 (aged 76) The Hague, the Netherlands

Sport
- Sport: Horse riding
Medal record
Representing the Netherlands
Olympic Games
Silver medal – second place	1932 Los Angeles	Team eventing

Aernout van Lennep (23 February 1898 – 17 December 1974) was a Dutch horse rider. He competed in eventing at the 1932 Summer Olympics and won a team silver medal, finishing ninth individually.

Van Lennep was a career artillery officer, and won the Dutch military championships in 1931. He was a prisoner of war in Germany during World War II, and later became a lieutenant colonel in the 1950s.
