= Clarence von Rosen Jr. =

Swedish equestrian

Olympic medal record

Men's Equestrian
Bronze medal – third place	1932 Los Angeles	Individual eventing
Bronze medal – third place	1932 Los Angeles	Individual jumping

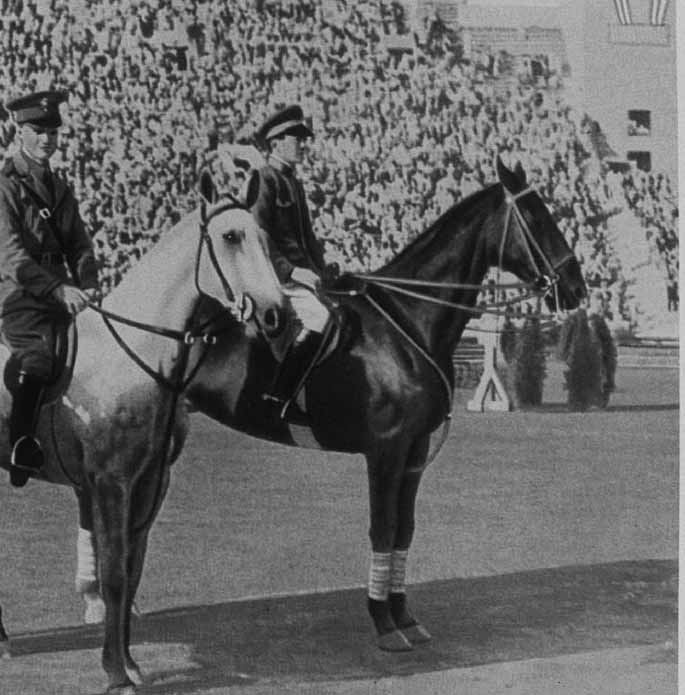
Clarence von Rosen 1932

Clarence von Rosen Jr. (November 10, 1903 – July 7, 1933) was a Swedish horse rider who competed in the 1932 Summer Olympics. In 1932, he and his horse Sunnyside Maid won the bronze medal in the individual eventing.

At the same Olympics, he also won the bronze medal in the individual jumping competition with his horse Empire. In both events, the Swedish team was not able to complete the competition with three riders, therefore he was unable to win team medals.

He was the son of Clarence von Rosen. Rosen died in a plane crash in 1933 while the passenger of an aircraft during an airshow.
