= Arne Francke =

Swedish officer & equestrian (1904–1973)

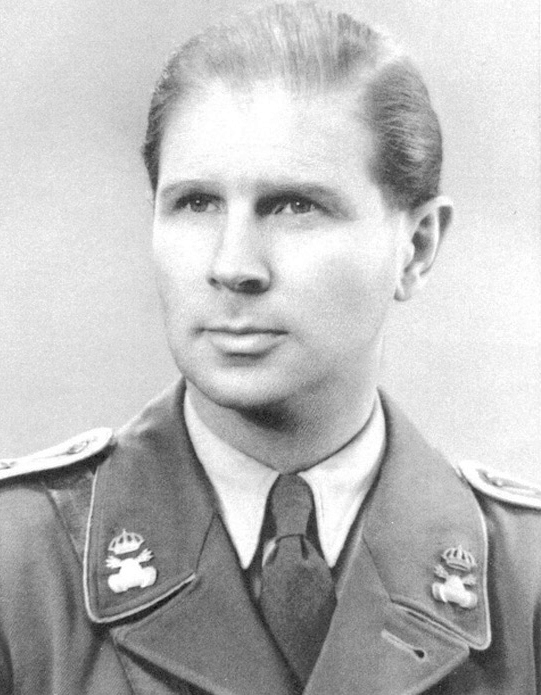
- Francke in 1930s
- Born: Arne Eduard Francke; 6 May 1904; Stockholm, Sweden
- Died: 11 March 1973 (aged 68); Stockholm, Sweden
- Military career
- Allegiance: Swedish Armed Forces
- Branch: Swedish Army
- Service years: 1924–1950
- Rank: Lieutenant colonel
- Commands: Chief of staff, VII. milo Neutral Nations Repatriation Commission
- Sports career
- Sport: Horse riding
- Club: K1 IF, Stockholm

Arne Eduard Francke (6 May 1904 – 11 March 1973) was a Swedish Army officer and horse rider. Francke had a military career that began in 1924 as a second lieutenant and progressed to lieutenant colonel by 1946. He served as Adjutant to the King, Chief of Staff for the VII Military District, and defence and military attaché in London, The Hague, and Brussels. In 1953–1954, he led the Swedish contingent in the Neutral Nations Repatriation Commission in Korea.

He was active in several organizations related to equestrian sports, including the Swedish Equestrian Federation and the committee for the 1956 Olympic equestrian events. As a rider, he trained in Italy and competed internationally, winning in Lucerne in 1929 and Aachen in 1930 with his horse Urfé. From 1925 to 1938, he won 58 show jumping events and placed in more than 130, and he also competed in eventing and steeplechase. Francke took part in the 1932 and 1936 Summer Olympics, with a best result of 25th place in individual jumping in 1936.

== Early life ==
Francke was born on 6 May 1904 in Stockholm, Sweden, the son of Eduard Francke, a wholesaler, and his wife Hedvig Möller.

== Career ==
=== Military career ===
Francke was commissioned as a second lieutenant in the Scanian Hussar Regiment in 1924. He became a lieutenant in the Life Regiment of Horse in 1932, a captain in the General Staff Corps in 1937, and a major in the Swedish Armoured Troops in 1942. He was promoted to lieutenant colonel in the General Staff Corps in 1946 and transferred to the reserve in 1950.

He served as Adjutant to the King in 1943, Chief of Staff for the VII Military District in 1944, and from 1946 to 1950 held the position of Defense and Military Attaché in London, The Hague, and Brussels. In 1953–1954, he headed the Swedish contingent in the Neutral Nations Repatriation Commission in Korea.

Francke was an honorary member of the International Federation for Equestrian Sports, chairman of the Jönköping district of the Swedish Red Cross, and a member of the executive committee for the 1956 Olympic equestrian events. He also held roles in the Swedish Thoroughbred Breeding Association (Svenska fullblodsavelsföreningen), served on the national council of the Swedish Equestrian Federation (Svenska ridsportens centralförbund), and was a member of the Jockey Club (Jockeyklubben), the Horse Owners' Association (Hästägareföreningen), the Nya Sällskapet, and the Timmermansorden.

=== Equestrian career ===
Francke’s most notable international victories came in Lucerne in 1929 on Fridolin and in Aachen in 1930 on Urfé. He also earned significant wins riding Kornett, a horse from the Vittskövle Stud Farm. Having trained at the prestigious Italian riding school in Pinerolo, Francke was regarded in the early 1930s as one of Europe’s finest equestrians. His elegant pairing with Urfé was particularly admired—and feared—on the international competition circuit.

Between 1925 and 1938, Francke competed in a wide range of show jumping events, winning 58 and placing in 131. In eventing, he entered 13 competitions, winning four and placing in six. He also competed in and placed in three dressage events. Among his Swedish victories were the King's Cup in 1930 (on Kornett), the Swedish Riding Club’s Grand Prix in 1934–1936, and Prince Carl's Prize in the 1930 army eventing championship (on Fridolin).

Francke began his riding career as a steeplechase jockey while attending the Strömsholm Riding School in 1925. Between 1925 and 1928, he achieved several victories with his horses Drinkmore and Clan Robert, including the King’s and Crown Prince's honorary prizes. In total, he recorded eight wins and twenty placings on the racetrack.

He competed in jumping at the 1932 and 1936 Summer Olympics, both times with the same horse Urfé, and in eventing at the 1932 Olympics. His best result was 25th place in individual jumping in 1936.

== Personal life ==
In 1930, Francke married Baroness Elsa Wrede (born 1907), the daughter of the Crown Equerry, Count Fabian Wrede and Gerda Burén.

== Dates of rank ==
- 1924 – Second lieutenant
- 1932 – Lieutenant
- 1937 – Captain
- 1942 – Major
- 1946 – Lieutenant colonel

== Awards and decorations ==
- (Sweden) King Gustaf V's Jubilee Commemorative Medal (1948)
- (Sweden) King Gustaf V's Commemorative Medal (1951)
- (Sweden) Knight of the Order of the Sword
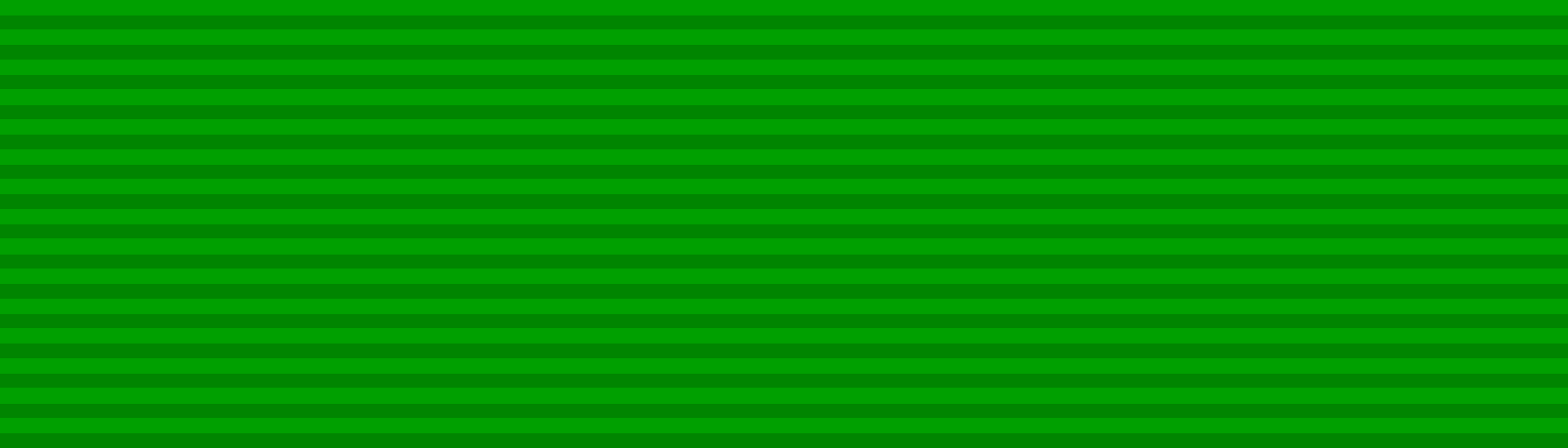
- (Sweden) Knight of the Order of Vasa
