= Equestrian events at the 1932 Summer Olympics =

Equestrian at the Games of the X Olympiad
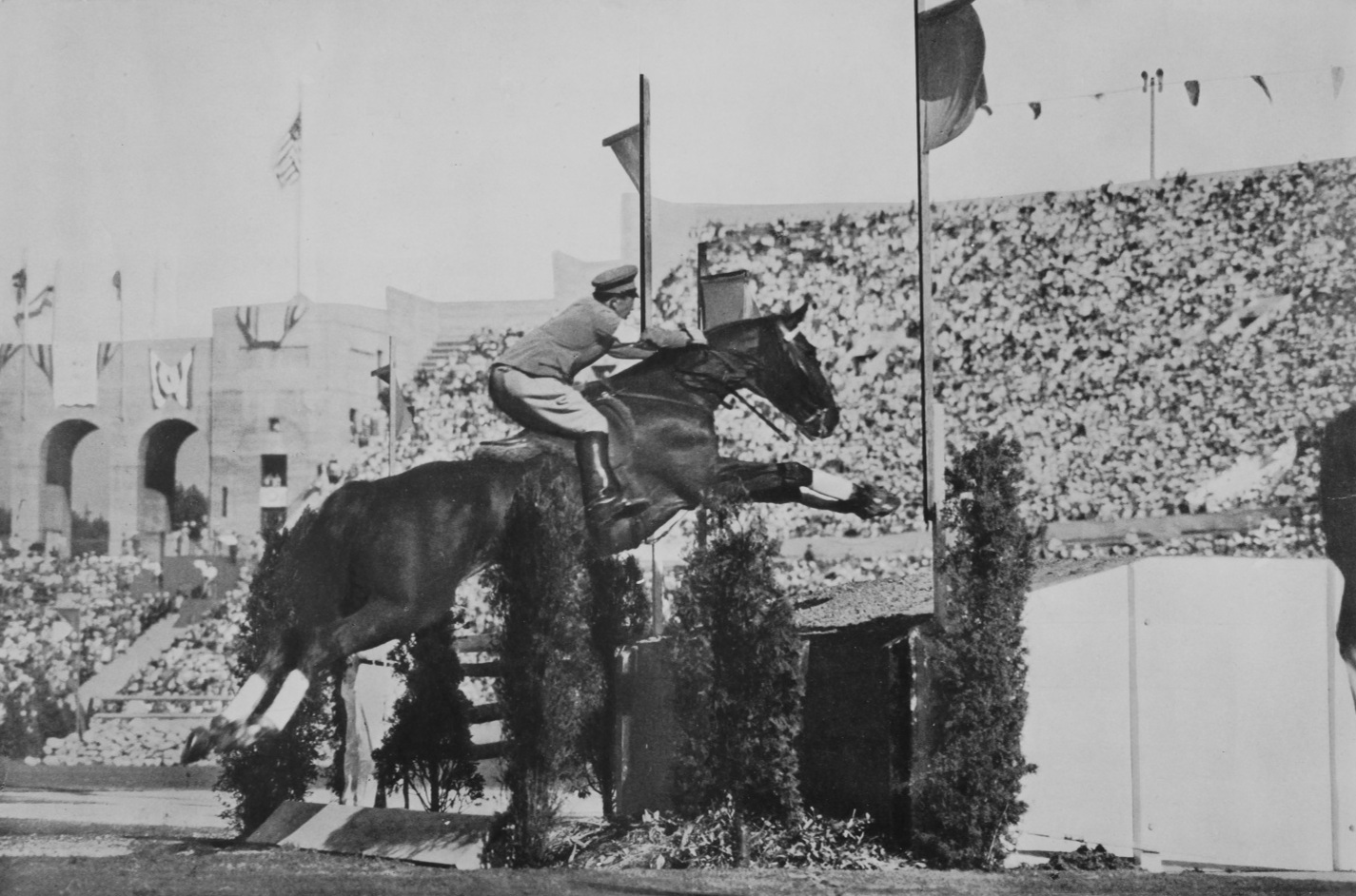
- Takeichi Nishi with Uranus at the 1932 Summer Games
- Venue: Riviera Country Club; Westchester; Olympic Stadium
- Dates: 10–14 August 1932
- No. of events: 6
- Competitors: 31 from 6 nations

The equestrian events at the 1932 Los Angeles Summer Games included dressage (team and individual medals), eventing (team and individual medals), and show jumping (individual medals while team medals were not awarded). The competitions were held from 10 to 14 August 1932. Due to the worldwide Great Depression, only 31 entries from 6 nations competed—which was to be the lowest participation of any Olympic Games.

== Disciplines ==
=== Jumping ===
The jumping competition had 11 riders from 4 nations. While individual medals were awarded, none of the teams managed to have three riders finish the course so team medals were not awarded. The 18-obstacle, 20-effort course was 1,060 meters in length, and included two fences at 1.60 meters, a very difficult wall, and a water that was 5 meters in width. 100,000 spectators were present at the show jumping competition.

=== Dressage ===
The dressage had 10 riders from 4 nations, and was held on the Riviera Country Club's polo field. 25,000 spectators watched the 16-minute tests, which now for the first time included piaffe and passage. A controversy arose after Swedish rider Bertil Sandström was accused of clicking to his horse, which was not allowed under FEI rules. Sandström claimed it was simply his new saddle squeaking. After being reviewed by the Appeals Committee consisting of FEI President Guy Henry, FEI Vice President Clarence von Rosen of Sweden, and FEI Secretary General Georges Hector of France, the decision was made to place Sandström, who was in silver position, last individually but to allow his score to count for his team. This resulted in a French rider moving into individual silver position and an American moving into bronze.

=== Eventing ===
14 riders competed with only 3 teams starting: the United States, The Netherlands, and Sweden. Sweden's Arne Francke was eliminated during the cross-country phase, so only team gold (United States) and silver (The Netherlands) were awarded. Pahud de Mortanges won his second consecutive individual gold medal, while individual silver went to Earl Foster Thomson on Jenny Camp who was to repeat that performance at the 1936 Olympic Games. The bronze winner in the eventing competition, Clarence von Rosen junior, also won bronze in the Jumping competition.

== Medal summary ==
Games	Gold	Silver	Bronze
Individual dressage	Xavier Lesage and Taine; France	Charles Marion and Linon; France	Hiram Tuttle and Olympic; United States
Team dressage	France; Xavier Lesage and Taine; Charles Marion and Linon; André Jousseaume and Sorelta	Sweden; Bertil Sandström and Kreta; Thomas Byström and Gulliver; Gustaf Adolf Boltenstern, Jr. and Ingo	United States; Hiram Tuttle and Olympic; Isaac Kitts and American Lady; Alvin Moore and Water Pat
Individual eventing	Charles Pahud de Mortanges and Ferdinand; Netherlands	Earl Foster Thomson and Jenny Camp; United States	Clarence von Rosen, Jr. and Sunnyside Maid; Sweden
Team eventing	United States; Earl Foster Thomson and Jenny Camp; Harry Chamberlin and Pleasant Smiles; Edwin Argo and Honolulu Tomboy	Netherlands; Charles Pahud de Mortanges and Marcroix; Karel Schummelketel and Duiveltje; Aernout van Lennep and Henk	Only two nations completed the course with three riders
Individual jumping	Takeichi Nishi and Uranus; Japan	Harry Chamberlin and Show Girl; United States	Clarence von Rosen, Jr. and Empire; Sweden
Team jumping	Event declared void: no nation completed the course with three riders		

== Participating nations ==
Each country was allowed to enter three riders in every event. A total number of 35 riders were originally entered.

A total of 31 horse riders from 6 nations competed at the Los Angeles Games:

- France (3)
- Japan (5)
- Mexico (6)
- Netherlands (3)
- Sweden (6)
- United States (8)

== Medal table ==
Rank	Nation	Gold	Silver	Bronze	Total
1	France	2	1	0	3
2	United States	1	2	2	5
3	Netherlands	1	1	0	2
4	Japan	1	0	0	1
5	Sweden	0	1	2	3
Totals (5 entries)		5	5	4	14

== Officials ==
Appointment of officials was as follows:

Dressage

- (United States) Col. Sloan Doak (Ground Jury President)
- (France) Gen. Lafont (Ground Jury Member)
- (Sweden) Count Carl Bonde (Ground Jury Member)

Jumping

- (United States) Col. Sloan Doak (Ground Jury President)
- (Sweden) Count Carl Bonde (Ground Jury Member)
- (Japan) Col. Kohei Yusa (Ground Jury Member)
- (United States) John A. Barry (Course Designer)

Eventing

- (Sweden) Count Carl Bonde (Ground Jury President)
- (United States) Col. Sloan Doak (Ground Jury Member)
- (Netherlands) Charles H. Labouchere (Ground Jury Member)
