= Jane Fauntz =

American swimmer and diver

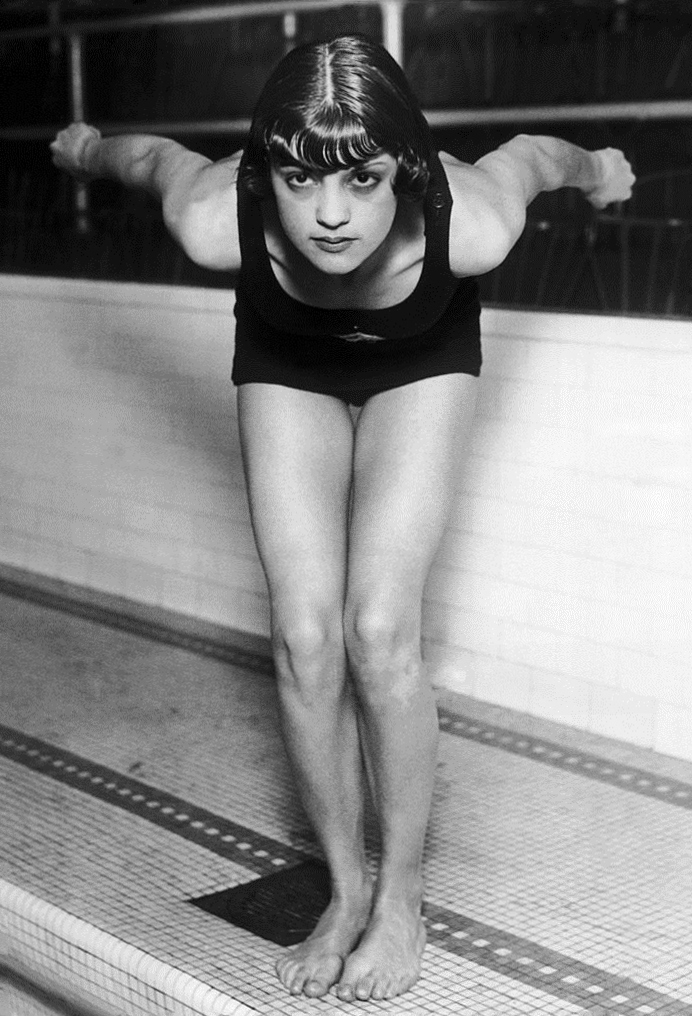
- Fauntz in 1928

Personal information
- Full name: Jane Fauntz
- National team: United States
- Born: December 19, 1910 New Orleans, Louisiana, US
- Died: May 30, 1989 (aged 78) Escondido, California, US
- Height: 5 ft 10 in (1.78 m)

Sport
- Sport: Diving, swimming
- Event(s): Breaststroke, 3 m springboard
- Club: Illinois Women's Athletic Club
Medal record
Women's diving
Representing the United States
Olympic Games
Bronze medal – third place	1932 Los Angeles	3 m springboard

Jane Fauntz (December 19, 1910 – May 30, 1989), also known by her married name Jane Manske, was a national champion swimmer and diver, and a member of the United States Olympic teams in 1928 (swimming) and 1932 (springboard diving). She was the bronze medalist for springboard diving at the 1932 Summer Olympics in Los Angeles.

Fauntz was born in New Orleans, and raised in Chicago, where she attended Hyde Park High School. Unable to compete in high school swimming competitions because of a ban on female interscholastic athletics in Illinois, Fauntz competed as a teenager first for Hirsch Center and then for the Illinois Women's Athletic Club swimming and diving teams. In March 1928 she set new world records for the 100-yard breaststroke (1:20.3) and 100-meter breaststroke (1:29.3) at a dual meet against a Canadian team. About six months before that she was hit by a car and severely injured the radial nerve in her right arm.

At the age of 17 at the 1928 Summer Olympics in Amsterdam, Fauntz finished in fifth place in the women's 200-meter breaststroke. Her specialty, however, was diving. Describing Fauntz during the Olympic diving competition, author Paul Gallico wrote in the New York Daily News:

"..Her marvelous body flowed through the dives with the smoothness of running quicksilver."

That "marvelous body" became a source of mild controversy at the Los Angeles games, when a Hungarian diving judge, Dr. Leo Donath, ordered the diving competition halted until the American divers changed their suits; he had objected to the near-backless cut of the team-supplied swimsuit.

At the Amateur Athletic Union (AAU) swimming indoor national championships in Chicago in 1929, Fauntz won two national titles within 30 minutes, winning the one-meter springboard and 100-meter breaststroke titles.

Fauntz captured the three-meter springboard bronze medal at the 1932 Los Angeles Olympics, finishing 5 points behind gold medalist Georgia Coleman and a single point behind silver medalist Katherine Rawls, helping the United States team to a sweep of the event. Fauntz led the competition after the compulsory dives, but slipped to third after mistiming the entry on her next-to-last optional dive. (Fauntz later said this dive was "the worst one I'd ever done. There went my world; I didn't even want to come up from the pool.")

Fauntz parlayed her Olympic success to a career in marketing, modeling, and professional aquatic exhibitions. She became one of the first female athletes to appear on the Wheaties cereal box; she was also one of many celebrities of the time recruited to endorse cigarettes (in her case, Camels) and beer (Falstaff). Jane also appeared as cover girl for Life and Ladies Home Journal. She worked as a model for Saks Fifth Avenue. As a professional diver, Fauntz appeared in exhibitions at the Chicago World's Fair in 1933, where she met future husband Edgar "Eggs" Manske, an All-American football star at Northwestern University; they married in 1936.

An artist by training (B.A., art education, University of Illinois) and vocation, Fauntz was a painter and sculptor. While her husband was serving in the United States Navy during World War II, she made ceramic figurines for California Faience in Berkeley, California, and later sold her figurines under the trade name "Jane Fauntz Original". She taught high school art classes for 20 years at Las Lomas High School in Walnut Creek, California, where she also coached boys' diving. Her bronze bust of former University of California football coach Lynn "Pappy" Waldorf is on display at the university's Sports Hall of Fame.

Fauntz died of leukemia on May 30, 1989. In 1991 she was posthumously inducted into the International Swimming Hall of Fame.

== See also ==
- List of members of the International Swimming Hall of Fame
- List of Olympic medalists in diving
