= Etsuko Kamakura =

Japanese diver

Personal information
- Nationality: Japanese
- Born: 1914 Yamaguchi Prefecture, Japan

Sport
- Sport: Diving

Etsuko Kamakura (鎌倉悦子, Kamakura Etsuko; born 1914, date of death unknown) was a Japanese diver. She competed in two events (3 metre springboard & 10 metre platform) at the 1932 Summer Olympics. She scored 60.78 points in the Women's 3M springboard and 31.54 points in the Women's 10M platform.
