= Maxine McCormick =

American fly casting champion

Maxine McCormick (born 2004) is the youngest world champion in fly casting history. In 2016, at age 12, she won the women's World Casting Championship in fly-fishing. She is America's No. 1 female caster. She is the first child to participate in and win a gold medal at a world-class event since 13-year old American diver Marjorie Gestring won the 1936 Berlin Olympics.

== Career ==
=== National Casting Championships ===
At the 2017 National Casting Championships, held in San Jose, California, McCormick beat her hall of fame mentor and coach Chris Korich. Maxine ranked fourth in North America in flycasting accuracy, and she earned a spot on the All America team for her third year (she first made the team at age 11).

=== All American Team ===
The following Bay Area casters won spots on the All American Team: Maxine McCormick, Chris Korich, John Thiele and Rene Gillibert. McCormick is the youngest person to ever make the team.

=== 2016 World Championships of Flycasting ===
Held in Estonia, Maxine won the gold medal in the women's "trout accuracy" event. She became the youngest gold medal winner at age 12.

=== 2018 World Championships of Flycasting ===
In the 2018 championships, which were held on the coast of England, McCormick won the women's Trout Accuracy again, with a score of 52pts in 30-50 mph wind gusts. She also won gold in the women's Salmon Distance with a cast of 57.5m or 189 ft, and won SILVER in the Sea Trout Distance, with a cast of 47.5m or 161 ft!

== Personal life ==
McCormick grew up in San Francisco, California and now lives in Portland, Oregon. McCormick's father took her fly fishing for the first time when she was 9. McCormick has a younger brother named Tobias.
