= Olga Jensch-Jordan =

German diver

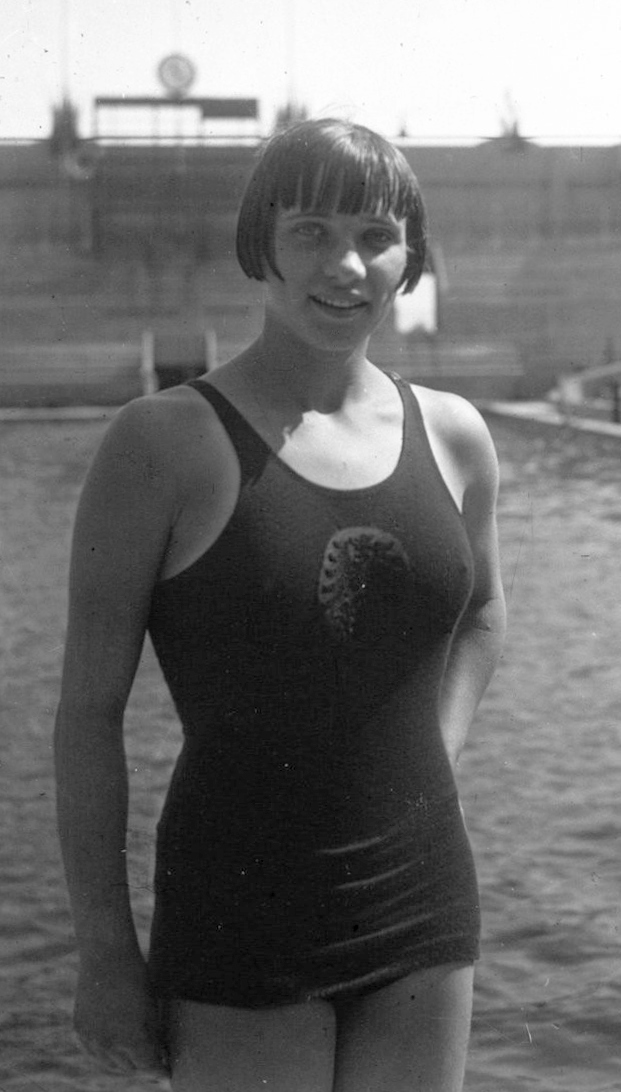
- Jensch-Jordan at the 1931 European Championships

Personal information
- Born: 13 March 1913 Nürnberg, Germany
- Died: 13 February 2000 (aged 86) Berlin, Germany

Sport
- Sport: Diving
- Club: SB Bayern 07, Nürnberg
Medal record
Women's diving
European Championships
Representing Germany
Gold medal – first place	1931 Paris	3 m springboard
Representing Germany
Gold medal – first place	1934 Magdeburg	3 m springboard

Olga Jensch-Jordan (née Jordan, 13 March 1913 – 13 February 2000) was a German diver who specialized in the 3-meter springboard. In this event she won the European title in 1931 and 1934, and competed at the 1932 and 1936 Summer Olympics, finishing fourth and fifth, respectively.

Her future husband, Dr. Arthur Jensch, was the vice Chef de Mission of Germany at the 1932 Olympics. During World War II he fought as an SS stormtrooper and was killed in action in 1945 near Berlin.

After retiring from competitions, Jensch-Jordan became a renowned diving coach. In 1948 she co-founded the German Sports Federation and in 1951 the National Olympic Committee of East Germany. Her son-in-law Hans-Dieter Pophal also became an Olympic diver, competing in the springboard at the 1960 and 1964 Olympics.
