= Diving at the 1932 Summer Olympics – Women's 10 metre platform =

Women's 10 metre platform at the Games of the X Olympiad

Medalists
1st place, gold medalist(s)		Dorothy Poynton-Hill	United States
2nd place, silver medalist(s)		Georgia Coleman	United States
3rd place, bronze medalist(s)		Marion Roper	United States

The women's 10 metre platform, also reported as high diving, was one of four diving events on the diving at the 1932 Summer Olympics programme. The competition was actually held from both 10 metre and 5 metre platforms. Divers performed a total of four compulsory dives – running plain header forward, standing backward spring and forward dive with pike (10 metre), standing forward plain header, running forward plain header (5 metre). The competition was held on Friday 12 August 1932. Seven divers from five nations competed.

== Results ==
Since there were only seven entries, instead of groups, a direct final was contested.

=== Final ===
Place	Diver	Nation	Score
1st place, gold medalist(s)	Dorothy Poynton-Hill	United States	40.26
2nd place, silver medalist(s)	Georgia Coleman	United States	35.56
3rd place, bronze medalist(s)	Marion Roper	United States	35.22
4	Ingeborg Sjöqvist	Sweden	34.52
5	Ingrid Larsen	Denmark	31.96
6	Etsuko Kamakura	Japan	31.36
7	Magdalena Epply	Austria	26.76

== Sources ==
- Xth Olympiad Committee of the Games of Los Angeles, U.S.A. 1932, Ltd. (1933). "The Games of the Xth Olympiad Los Angeles 1932 - Official Report" (PDF). Xth Olympiad Committee of the Games of Los Angeles, U.S.A. 1932, Ltd. pp. p. 668.
