= Ingrid Larsen =

Danish diver

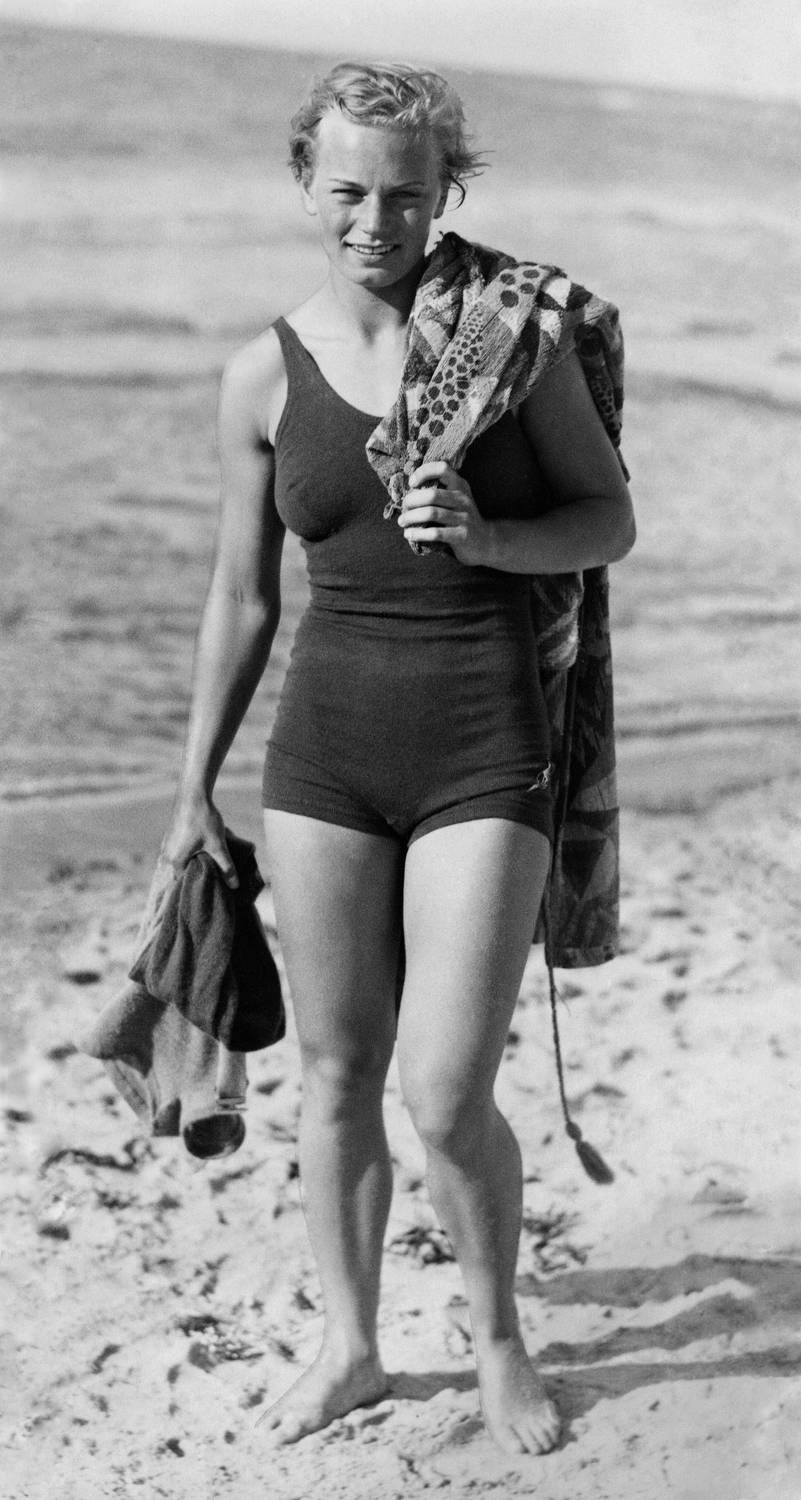
- Ingrid Larsen in 1931

Personal information
- Born: 12 July 1912 Rudkøbing, Denmark
- Died: 18 February 1997 (aged 84)

Sport
- Sport: Diving
- Club: DKG, København

Ingrid Larsen (later Sabroe; 12 July 1912 – 18 February 1997) was a Danish diver who competed in the 1932 Summer Olympics. She finished fifth in the 10 metre platform and eighth in the 3 metre springboard events.

She married Povl Sabroe on 10 February 1945 with whom she had two sons.
