= Diving at the 1936 Summer Olympics – Women's 3 metre springboard =

Women's 3 metre springboard at the Games of the XI Olympiad

Medalists
1st place, gold medalist(s)		Marjorie Gestring	United States
2nd place, silver medalist(s)		Katherine Rawls	United States
3rd place, bronze medalist(s)		Dorothy Poynton-Hill	United States

The women's 3 metre springboard, also reported as springboard diving, was one of four diving events on the diving at the 1936 Summer Olympics programme.

The competition, held on Wednesday 12 August, was split into two sets of dives held on the same day:

1. Compulsory dives
  Divers performed three pre-chosen dives – a running straight somersault forward, standing header backward with pike, and running straight isander-half gainer.
2. Facultative dives
  Divers performed three dives of their choice (from different categories and different from the compulsory).

Sixteen divers from nine nations competed.

At the age of 13 years and 268 days, Marjorie Gestring won the gold medal in 3-meter springboard diving at the 1936 Summer Olympics in Berlin, making her at the time the youngest person ever to win an Olympic gold medal. She remains the second-youngest Olympic gold medalist, as of 2026. (Note: In the 1900 men's coxed pair rowing, an unidentified boy aged 12 or less coxed the winning pair in the final; however, only semifinal cox Hermanus Brockmann is listed by the IOC. Winners received silver medals at the 1900 games.)

== Results ==
Place	Diver	Nation	Score
1st place, gold medalist(s)	Marjorie Gestring	United States	89.27
2nd place, silver medalist(s)	Katherine Rawls	United States	88.35
3rd place, bronze medalist(s)	Dorothy Poynton-Hill	United States	82.36
4	Gerda Daumerlang	Germany	78.27
5	Olga Jensch-Jordan	Germany	77.98
6	Masayo Osawa	Japan	73.94
7	Suse Heinz	Germany	71.49
8	Fusako Kono	Japan	70.27
9	Betty Slade	Great Britain	69.95
10	Lynda Adams	Canada	67.44
11	Inger Nordbø	Norway	65.94
12	Magdalene Epply-Staudinger	Austria	65.76
13	Katinka Larsen	Great Britain	64.00
14	Annie Villiger	Switzerland	62.38
15	Thelma Boughner	Canada	60.04
16	Cécile Lesprit-Poirier	France	58.86

== Sources ==
- Organisationskomitee für die XI. Olympiade Berlin 1936 e.V. (1937). "The XIth Olympic Games, Berlin 1936 - Official Report, Volume II" (PDF). Wilhelm Limpert, Berlin, S.W. 68. pp. pp.338–41. Archived from the original (pdf) on 9 July 2007.
- Herman de Wael (9 October 2002). "Diving - women's springboard (Berlin 1936)".
