= 1932 Summer Olympics opening ceremony =

- Part of 1932 Summer Olympics
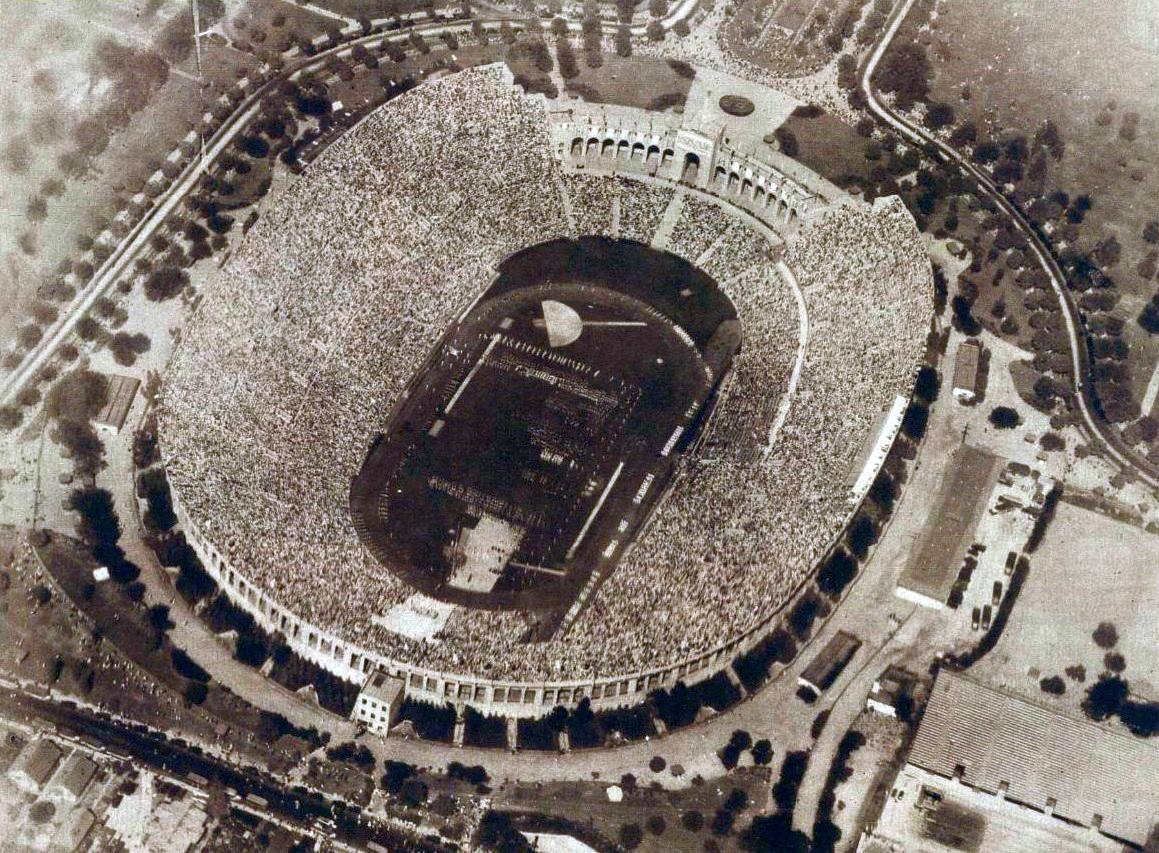
- 1932 Summer Olympics opening ceremony
- Date: 30 July 1932; 94 years ago
- Time: 14:30 – 16:30 PDT (UTC–7)
- Venue: Los Angeles Olympic Stadium
- Location: Los Angeles, California, United States; 34°0′51″N 118°17′16″W
- Also known as: Xth Olympiad
- Participants: 2,000

The opening ceremony of the 1932 Summer Olympics took place at 14:30 PDT, on Saturday, July 30, 1932, at the Los Angeles Memorial Coliseum. Then known as "Los Angeles Olympic Stadium". As mandated by the Olympic Charter, the proceedings of this international sporting event included welcoming speeches, hoisting of the flags and the parade of nations. It was held in-front of a crowd of over 101,000 people in attendance, a record not broken until the Sydney 2000 Summer Games.

The Games were officially opened by Vice-President of the United States of America Charles Curtis.

The master of ceremonies was prominent Los Angeles journalist Bill Henry. He was technical director and stadium announcer. The production team was kept in-house by the organizing committee.

== Dignitaries ==
The ceremony was attended by many local and foreign dignitaries.

=== Dignitaries from international organizations ===
  - IOC President Count Henri de Baillet-Latour
  - Members of the International Olympic Committee

=== Host nation dignitaries ===
- United States –
  - Vice-President Charles Curtis
  - California Governor James Rolph
  - Mayor of Los Angeles John Clinton Porter
  - Organizing Committee President William May Garland
  - actors Douglas Fairbanks, Tallulah Bankhead, Joan Crawford, Norma Shearer, John Barrymore, the Marx Brothers, Gary Cooper, Marlene Dietrich, Charlie Chaplin, Bing Crosby, and Cary Grant.
  - Head of MGM Studios Louis B. Mayer

== Proceedings ==
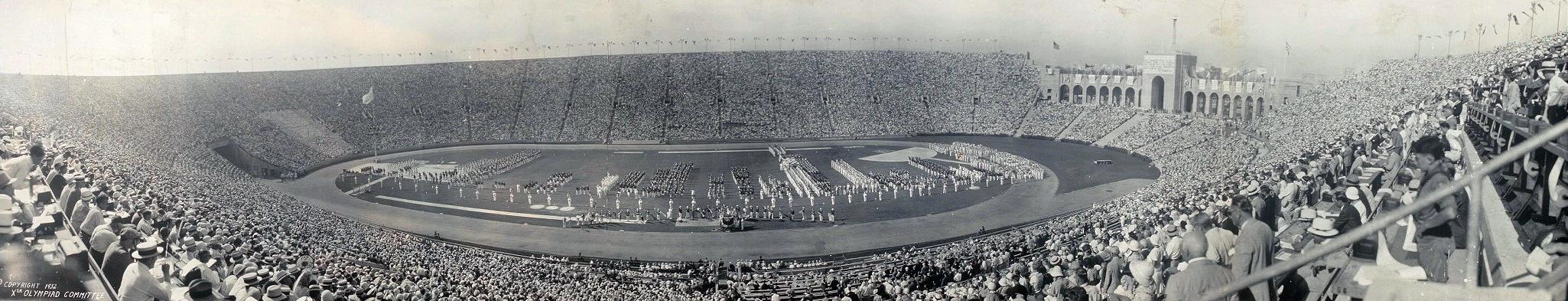
The Coliseum during the opening ceremony

Attended by 101,022 people. The ceremony included a 300-person orchestra, a choir of 1,200 singers. They performed national anthems and Olympic anthems. The ceremony began at exactly 2:30 pm with the introduction of vice-president Curtis entering the stadium thru the peristyle steps, accompanied by an IOC delegation. He was escorted to his box suite, while "Stars and Stripes forever" march played. Upon arrival to his suite, he greeted the crowd. The national anthem of the United States was played. The parade of nations then proceeded with Greece, per tradition.

Upon completion of the parade, organizing committee President William May Garland provided opening remarks of welcome to California and the City of Los Angeles before introducing Vice President Curtis to officially open the games. Vice President Curtis proclaimed: "In the name of the President of the United States, I proclaim open the Olympic Games of Los Angeles, celebrating the tenth olympics of the modern era".

As he completed his remarks, six trumpeters blared their horns from the ramparts atop the peristyle. A ten-cannon salute began, ten blasts to mark the opening from outside the main gates. Hundreds of homing pigeons were released. The cauldron torch was lit above the Coliseum peristyle after the tenth cannon blast. The chorus began to sing Walter Bradley-Keelers "Hymne Olympique", an anthem written specifically for the Xth Olympiad. As the anthem played, the Olympic flag was raised in the stadium.

Dr. Robert Gordon Sproul, UCLA president provided a dedication and benediction to the games. Next, American fencer George Calnan gave the Olympic Oath. The chorus then sang the poem Recessional by Rudyard Kipling. The athletes then exited the stadium, officially ending the ceremony.

The ceremony lasted two hours, 2,000 athletes, coaches, and officials from 37 nations participated. There was no specific final torchbearer or individual cauldron lighter at the ceremony. An uncredited stadium employee (often noted in operational logs as a hidden "torch man") manually lit the cauldron.

Also, 800 journalists, including 200 from abroad were issued press passes. Tickets were sold for US$3 (equivalent to US$56.02 in 2024) to the general crowd. It was estimated that an additional 50,000 people were not able to enter the stadium and lingered around Exposition Park.

== Anthems ==
The anthems were performed by the 1932 Los Angeles Choir and Orchestra.

- National Anthem of the United States
- (International Olympic Committee) Hymne Olympique
