= Gerda Daumerlang =

German diver (1920–2006)

Personal information
- Born: May 2, 1920 Nuremberg, Germany
- Died: March 16, 2006 (aged 85) Tettenweis, Germany

Sport
- Sport: Diving
Medal record
Representing Germany
European Championship
Silver medal – second place	1938 London	3m springboard

Gerda Daumerlang (2 May 1920 – 16 March 2006) was a German diver who competed in the 3 metre springboard event at the 1936 Summer Olympics. She finished fourth.
