= Suse Heinze =

German diver (1920–2018)

Personal information
- Full name: Susanne Margarete Charlotte Heinze
- Nationality: German
- Born: 25 May 1920 Berlin, Germany
- Died: 26 November 2018 (aged 98) Bad Honnef, Germany

Sport
- Sport: Diving
Medal record
Women's diving
Representing Germany
European Championships
Bronze medal – third place	1938 London	10 m highboard

Susanne "Suse" Heinze (May 25, 1920 – November 26, 2018) was a German diver who competed in the 1936 Summer Olympics. She was born in Berlin. In 1936 she finished seventh in the 3 metre springboard event. Heinze died in November 2018 at the age of 98.

Nationally, she won a total of seven titles in the platform (4) and the springboard (3) events.
