= Diving at the 1932 Summer Olympics – Women's 3 metre springboard =

Women's 3 metre springboard at the Games of the X Olympiad

Medalists
1st place, gold medalist(s)		Georgia Coleman	United States
2nd place, silver medalist(s)		Katherine Rawls	United States
3rd place, bronze medalist(s)		Jane Fauntz	United States

The women's 3 metre springboard, also reported as springboard diving, was one of four diving events on the diving at the 1932 Summer Olympics programme. For the first time, the competition was held exclusively from the 3 metre springboard. Divers performed three compulsory dives – running pike dive forward, standing backward straight somersault, running forward half-screw – and three dives of the competitor's choice (different from the compulsory) for a total of six dives. The competition was held on Wednesday 10 August 1932. Eight divers from six nations competed.

== Results ==
Since there were only eight entries, instead of groups, a direct final was contested.

Place	Diver	Nation	Score
1st place, gold medalist(s)	Georgia Coleman	United States	87.52
2nd place, silver medalist(s)	Katherine Rawls	United States	82.56
3rd place, bronze medalist(s)	Jane Fauntz	United States	82.12
4	Olga Jensch-Jordan	Germany	77.60
5	Doris Ogilvie	Canada	70.00
6	Magdalene Epply-Staudinger	Austria	63.70
7	Etsuko Kamakura	Japan	60.78
8	Ingrid Larsen	Denmark	57.26

== Sources ==
- Xth Olympiad Committee of the Games of Los Angeles, U.S.A. 1932, Ltd. (1933). "The Games of the Xth Olympiad Los Angeles 1932 - Official Report" (PDF). Xth Olympiad Committee of the Games of Los Angeles, U.S.A. 1932, Ltd. pp. p. 665.
