= Diving at the 1932 Summer Olympics =

Diving at the Games of the X Olympiad
- Venue: LA84 Foundation/John C. Argue Swim Stadium
- Dates: August 8–13, 1932
- No. of events: 4
- Competitors: 28 from 9 nations

At the 1932 Summer Olympics in Los Angeles, four diving events were organized, two for men, and two for women. The competitions were held from Monday, August 8, 1932 to Saturday, August 13, 1932.

== Medal summary ==
The events are labelled as 3 metre springboard and 10 metre platform by the International Olympic Committee, and appeared on the 1932 Official Report as springboard diving and high diving, respectively. The platform events included dives from both 10 metre and 5 metre platforms, but, from now on, the springboard events were reduced to dives from the 3 metre board.

=== Men ===
Event	Gold	Silver	Bronze
3 m springboard	Michael Galitzen (USA)	Harold Smith (USA)	Richard Degener (USA)
10 m platform	Harold Smith (USA)	Michael Galitzen (USA)	Frank Kurtz (USA)

=== Women ===
Event	Gold	Silver	Bronze
3 m springboard	Georgia Coleman (USA)	Katherine Rawls (USA)	Jane Fauntz (USA)
10 m platform	Dorothy Poynton (USA)	Georgia Coleman (USA)	Marion Roper (USA)

== Participating nations ==
A total of 28 divers (17 men and 11 women) from nine nations (men from seven nations – women from seven nations) competed at the Los Angeles Games:

- Austria (2) (men:1 women:1)
- Canada (3) (men:2 women:1)
- Denmark (1) (men:0 women:1)
- France (1) (men:1 women:0)
- Germany (2) (men:1 women:1)
- Japan (4) (men:3 women:1)
- Mexico (5) (men:5 women:0)
- Sweden (1) (men:0 women:1)
- United States (9) (men:4 women:5)

== Medal table ==
Rank	Nation	Gold	Silver	Bronze	Total
1	United States	4	4	4	12
Totals (1 entries)		4	4	4	12
