= Annie Villiger =

Swiss diver

Personal information
- Nationality: Swiss
- Born: 4 April 1914
- Died: 13 June 1987 (aged 73)

Sport
- Sport: Diving

Annie Villiger (4 April 1914 – 13 June 1987) was a Swiss diver. She competed in the women's 3 metre springboard event at the 1936 Summer Olympics.
