= Hans-Dieter Pophal =

German diver

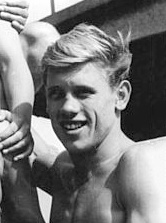
- Pophal in 1960

Personal information
- Born: 22 November 1937 (age 88) Berlin, Germany
- Height: 1.76 m (5 ft 9 in)
- Weight: 68 kg (150 lb)

Sport
- Sport: Diving
- Club: SC Einheit Berlin; Berliner TSC
Medal record
Representing East Germany
European Championships
Silver medal – second place	1962 Leipzig	Springboard

Hans-Dieter Pophal (born 22 November 1937) is a retired German diver. He competed in the springboard at the 1960 and 1964 Summer Olympics and finished in eighth and fourth place, respectively.

Pophal dominated the 3 m springboard event in the 1960s in Germany, winning all national titles in 1958 and 1960–1967; he also won a silver medal at the 1962 European Aquatics Championships.

He returned to competitions in the 1990s, winning world titles in the 1 m and 3 m springboard in the masters category in 1994; he also finished second in the 10 m platform.

He is a son-in-law of Olga Jensch-Jordan, who competed in the springboard at the 1932 and 1936 Olympics and later became a well-known diving coach in East Germany.
