= LA84 Foundation/John C. Argue Swim Stadium =

Aquatics center in California, US

Coordinates: 34.01229°N 118.28951°W

LA84/John C. Argue Swim Stadium
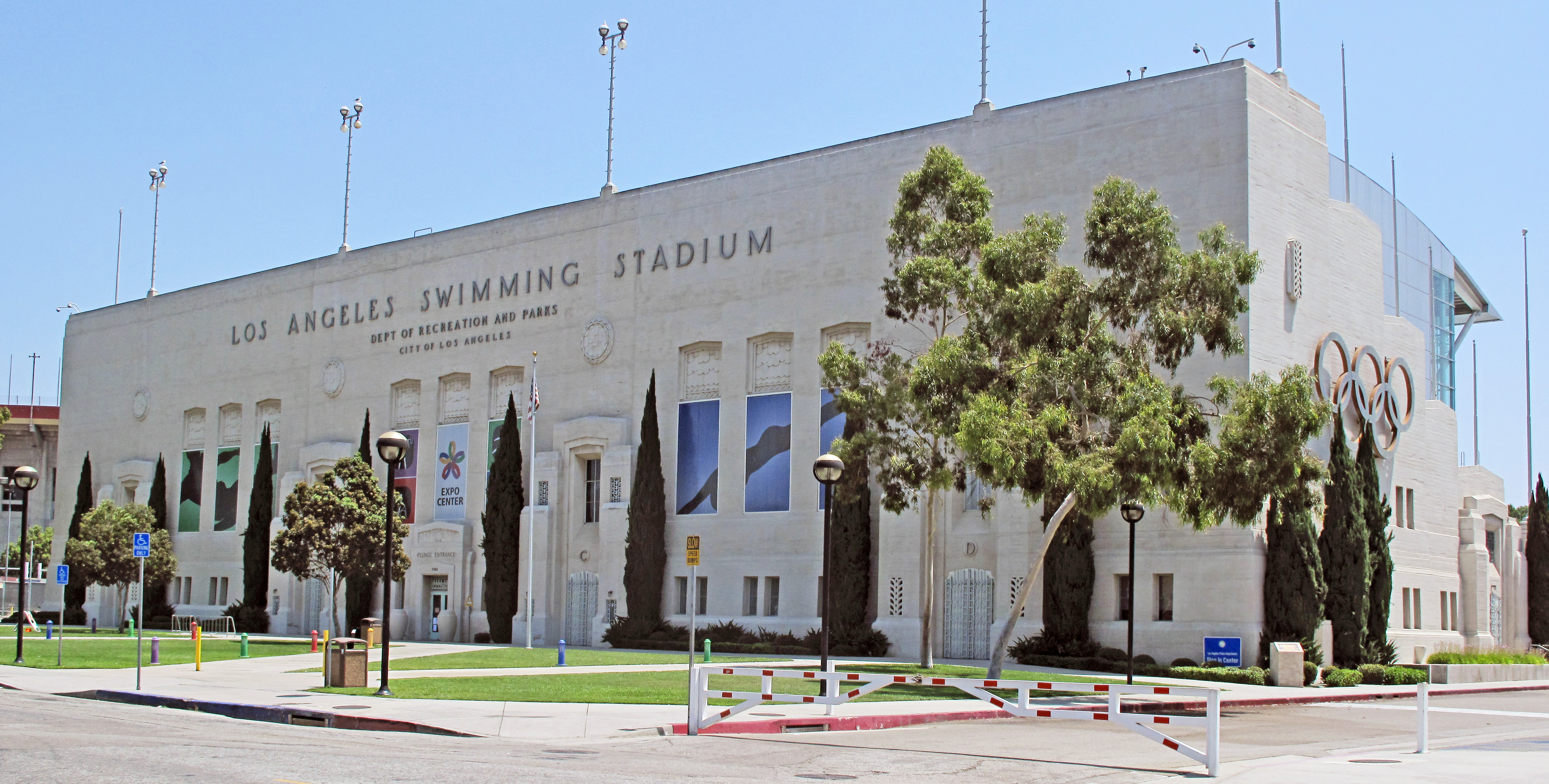
- The front of the LA84 Foundation/John C. Argue Swim Stadium in 2014
- Interactive map of LA84/John C. Argue Swim Stadium
- Owner: Los Angeles Coliseum Commission

Construction
- Opened: 1932

The LA84 Foundation/John C. Argue Swim Stadium (originally the Los Angeles Swimming Stadium) is an outdoor aquatics center that was originally constructed for the 1932 Summer Olympics in Los Angeles, California. Located adjacent to the Los Angeles Memorial Coliseum, the venue hosted the diving, swimming, water polo, and the swimming part of the modern pentathlon events.

The venue originally seated 10,000 people, including 5,000 in wooden bleacher seats that were removed after the 1932 games. The main swimming pool measures 165 ft (50 m) long by 64 ft (20 m) wide. A children's pool is adjacent to the main pool. The permanent grandstands at their top point was 15 ft (4.6 m) high spread over a length of 256 ft (78 m) and a width of 98 ft (30 m).

The facility was featured by Huell Howser in California's Gold Episode 702.

The venue was renovated from 2002 to 2003. Bentley Management Group was hired in 2006 to refurbish and install the Olympic Rings on the south side of the Swim Stadium. The Rings were used in the 1984 Summer Olympics and were lit by Rafer Johnson during the Opening Ceremony at the LA Coliseum.

The Swim Stadium was later renamed in honor of the LA84 Foundation and for John C. Argue (1931 or 1932–2002), a Los Angeles-based lawyer who served as a key board member for bringing the Olympics back to Los Angeles 52 years later. Argue also served as chair of the board of trustees for the University of Southern California from 2000 until his death in 2002, and was part of the unsuccessful effort to bring the 2016 Summer Olympics to Los Angeles.

The swim stadium was initially set to host diving during the 2028 Summer Olympics but the competition was moved to the nearby Rose Bowl Aquatics Center in Pasadena. As part of the agreement to move the diving competition, the swim stadium will undergo a series of renovation to improve the facility for future community use.
