= Marjorie Gestring =

American diver

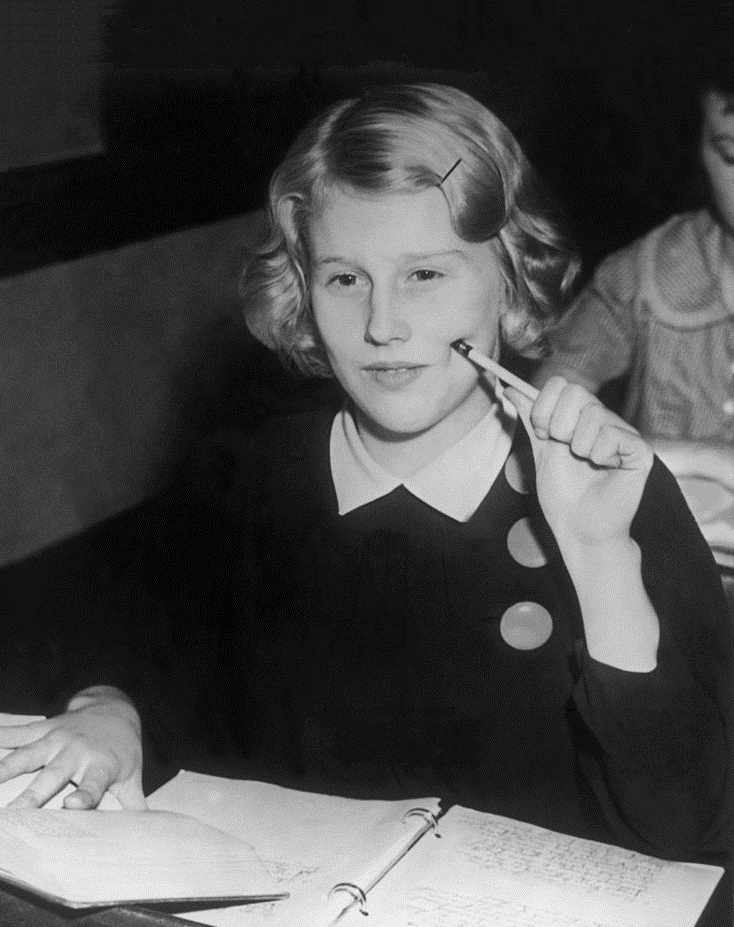
- Gestring in 1936

Personal information
- Nationality: American
- Born: November 18, 1922 Los Angeles, California, U.S.
- Died: April 20, 1992 (aged 69) Hillsborough, California, U.S.

Sport
- Country: United States
- Sport: Diving

Achievements and titles
- Olympic finals: 1936 Summer Olympics: 3 m springboard – Gold
- National finals: 1938 US Nationals:3 m springboard – Gold; 1939 US Nationals:3 m springboard – Gold; 1940 US Nationals:3 m springboard – Gold
Medal record
Representing the United States
Olympic Games
Gold medal – first place	1936 Berlin	3 m springboard

Marjorie Gestring (November 18, 1922 – April 20, 1992) was a competitive springboard diver from the United States. At the age of 13 years and 268 days, she won the gold medal in 3-meter springboard diving at the 1936 Summer Olympics in Berlin, making her at the time the youngest person ever to win an Olympic gold medal. She remains the second-youngest Olympic gold medalist, as of 2026. (Note: after South Korean speed skater Kim Yun-mi, who was 13 years and 85 days when she won gold at the 1994 Winter Olympics) A multi-time national diving champion in the United States, she was given a second Olympic gold medal by the United States Olympic Committee after the 1940 Summer Olympics were called off due to the advent of World War II. Gestring attempted to return to the Olympics at the 1948 Games, but failed to qualify for the US team. She has been inducted into the International Swimming Hall of Fame and the Stanford Athletic Hall of Fame.

== Diving career ==
Gestring won her first major title at the Amateur Athletic Union meeting at Chicago in 1936.

In the tryouts for the 1936 Summer Olympics for the United States team, she placed second behind Katherine Rawls in qualifying in the 3-meter springboard event. Gestring became the youngest person ever (Note: In the 1900 men's coxed pair rowing, an unidentified boy aged 12 or less coxed the winning pair in the final; however, only semifinal cox Hermanus Brockmann is listed by the IOC. Winners received silver medals at the 1900 games.) to win an Olympic gold medal at the age of 13 years and 268 days, in what was considered to be an upset, given her competition. Her final dive won her the competition, and her rival Rawls, who had already recognised that the dive had given the gold medal to Gestring instead of her, greeted Gestring as she left the pool. The winning score was 89.27, while Rawls' score was 88.35. Gestring was part of an all-American top three in the final round, with Rawls winning silver and Dorothy Poynton-Hill winning bronze. Rawls and Gestring were described as being in a "duel" for the gold medal, in front of 15,000 spectators.

Following her Olympic victory, Gestring competed in national championships in the run-up to the next Games. She won the US national title for 3-meter springboard in both 1938 and 1939. She also won the regional Far Western and Arizona State swimming championships in 1937.

Despite the cancellation of the 1940 Summer Olympics due to the advent of World War II, Gestring continued to compete at the national level within the United States. She was US National Women's High Diving Champion for 1939, and retained the title in 1940. She also retained the title for the 3-meter springboard that same year. A fellow diver of the same era, Margaret Ambrosia, stated that she would have expected Gestring to win the gold medal once more had the 1940 Olympic Games been held as planned. The United States Olympic Committee evidently agreed when they handed out gold, silver and bronze medals in lieu of the Games taking place, giving as they did the gold medal to Gestring. She attempted to make the US team once more in the 1948 Summer Olympics, but did not qualify, finishing in fourth place in the team trials.

== Marriage ==
In 1943, at the age of 19, Gestring married Edward Harrison Carter, then a student at UCLA.

== Later life and legacy ==
Gestring died on April 20, 1992, after an accident in her home in Hillsborough, California. She was 69.

She was inducted into the International Swimming Hall of Fame in 1976, and the Stanford Athletic Hall of Fame. Sports Illustrated listed Gestring when deciding California's Best Women Athlete, though it eventually named the tennis player Billie Jean King. Gestring's age record at the Olympics was broken by Kim Yun-mi at the 1994 Winter Olympics.

== See also ==
- List of members of the International Swimming Hall of Fame
