= Marion Roper =

American diver

Personal information
- Born: September 15, 1910 Chicago, Illinois, United States
- Died: February 10, 1991 (aged 80) Los Angeles, California, United States

Sport
- Sport: Diving
Medal record
Representing United States
Olympic Games
Bronze medal – third place	1932 Los Angeles	10 metre platform

Marion Charlotte Dale Roper (September 15, 1910 – February 10, 1991) was an American diver who competed in the 1932 Summer Olympics.

In the 1932 Olympics she won a bronze medal in the 10 meter platform event at the Los Angeles Olympics. She was born Marion Charlotte Dale, Chicago. She married William Roper and lived in the Los Angeles area until her death.
