= Georgia Coleman =

American diver

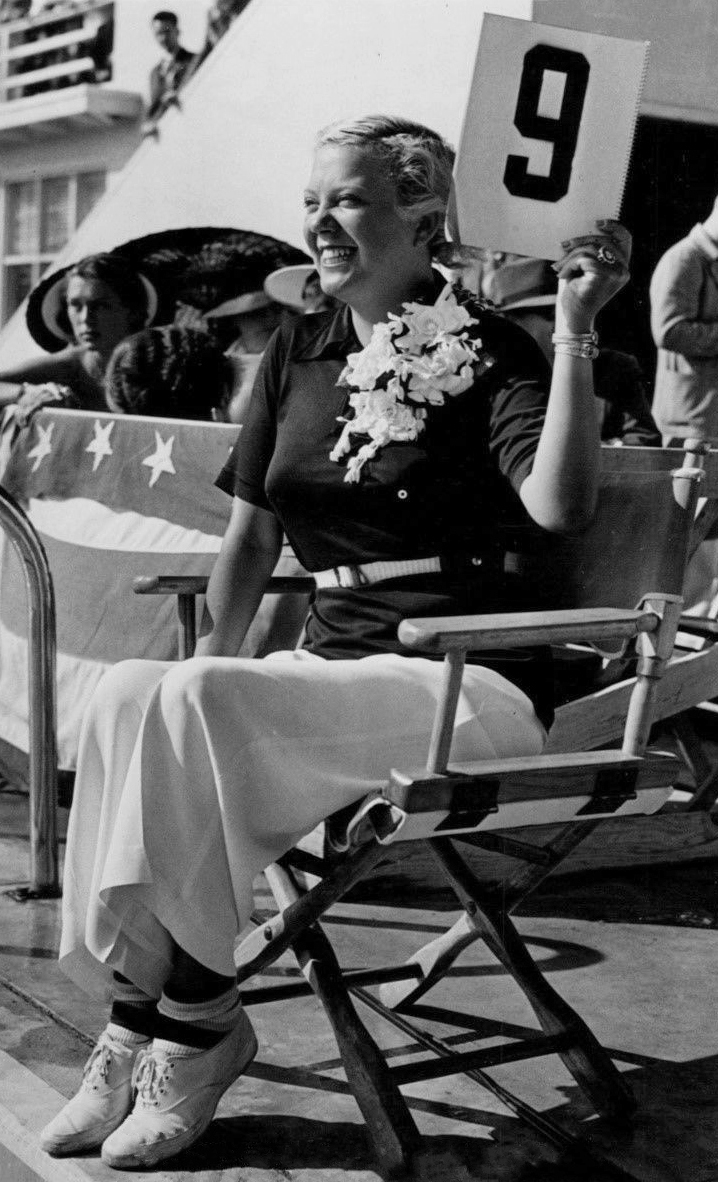
- Coleman in 1938

Personal information
- Born: January 23, 1912 St. Maries, Idaho, U.S.
- Died: September 14, 1940 (aged 28) Los Angeles, California, U.S.

Sport
- Sport: Diving
- Club: Los Angeles Athletic Club
Medal record
Representing the United States
Olympic Games
Gold medal – first place	1932 Los Angeles	3 m springboard
Silver medal – second place	1928 Amsterdam	10 m platform
Silver medal – second place	1932 Los Angeles	10 m platform
Bronze medal – third place	1928 Amsterdam	3 m springboard

Georgia V. Coleman (January 23, 1912 – September 14, 1940) was an American diver. She competed in the 3 m springboard and 10 m platform at the 1928 and 1932 Olympics and won one gold, one bronze and two silver medals. Domestically she collected 11 AAU titles.

At the 1932 Olympics, where she won the gold medal in the 3 metre springboard, Coleman announced her engagement to the Olympic diver Mickey Riley, but the marriage was cancelled. In 1937, she contracted polio. She learned to swim again, but two years later developed pneumonia as an after-effect of the polio, and died at the age of twenty-eight.

== See also ==
- List of members of the International Swimming Hall of Fame
