= Dorothy Poynton-Hill =

American diver

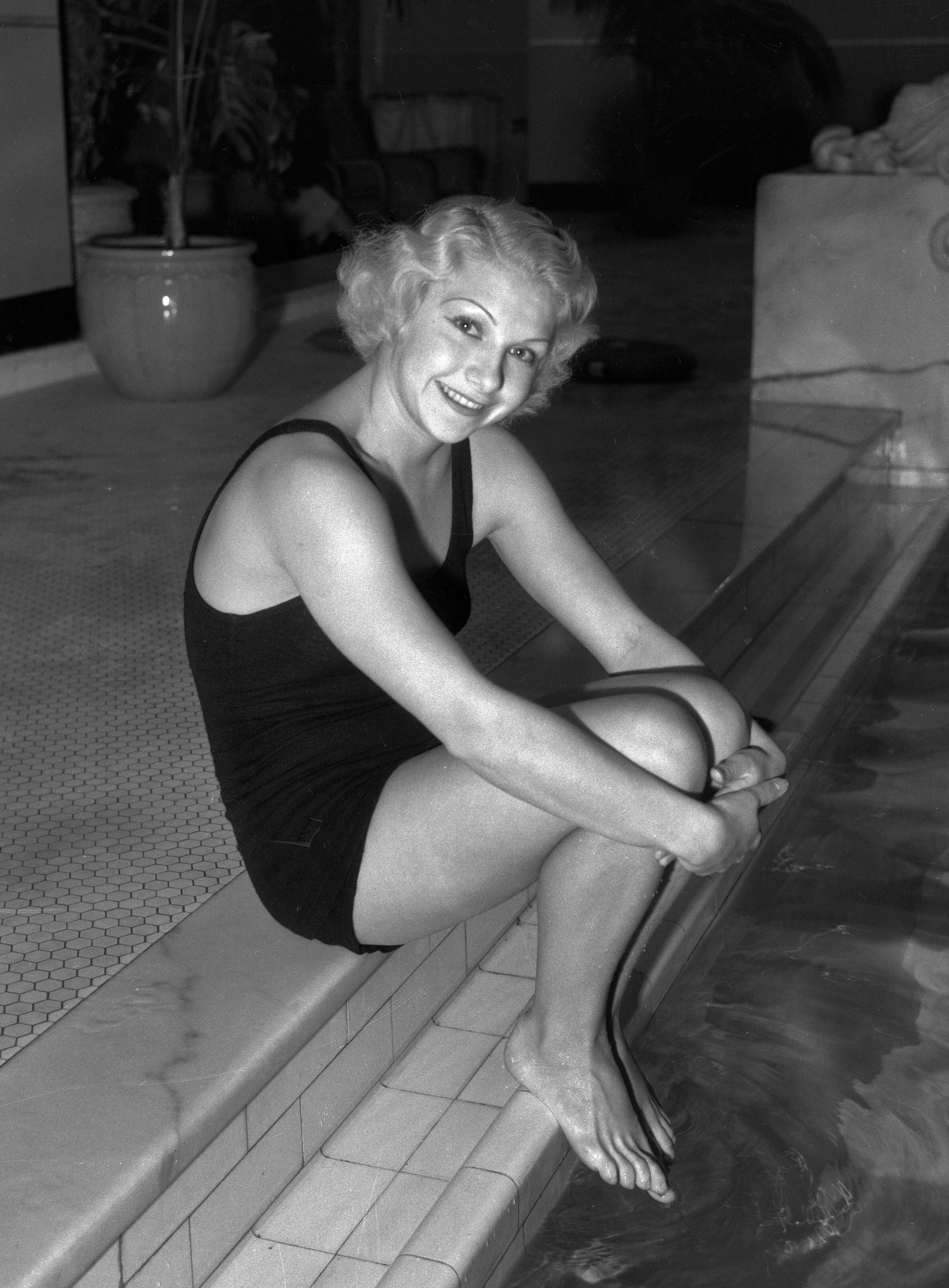
- Poynton-Hill in 1932

Personal information
- Born: July 17, 1915 Salt Lake City, Utah, U.S.
- Died: May 18, 1995 (aged 79) Riverside, California, U.S.

Sport
- Sport: Diving
- Club: LAAC, Los Angeles
Medal record
Representing the United States
Olympic Games
Silver medal – second place	1928 Amsterdam	3 m springboard
Gold medal – first place	1932 Los Angeles	10 metre platform
Gold medal – first place	1936 Berlin	10 metre platform
Bronze medal – third place	1936 Berlin	3 m springboard

Dorothy Poynton-Hill (née Poynton, later Teuber; July 17, 1915 – May 18, 1995) was an American diver who competed at the 1928, 1932 and 1936 Summer Olympics. She won the 10 m platform event in 1932 and 1936, while in the 3 m springboard she won a silver medal in 1928 and a bronze medal in 1936. In 1928, at age 13 she became the youngest Olympian to win a medal and, in 1936, the first Olympic diver to win the 10 m platform twice.

After retiring from competition, Poynton-Hill ran an aquatic club in Los Angeles and appeared in several TV commercials. In 1968, she was inducted into the International Swimming Hall of Fame.

== See also ==
- List of members of the International Swimming Hall of Fame
