= Rose Bowl Aquatics Center =

Aquatics facility in Pasadena, California

Coordinates: 34.151342°N 118.164386°W

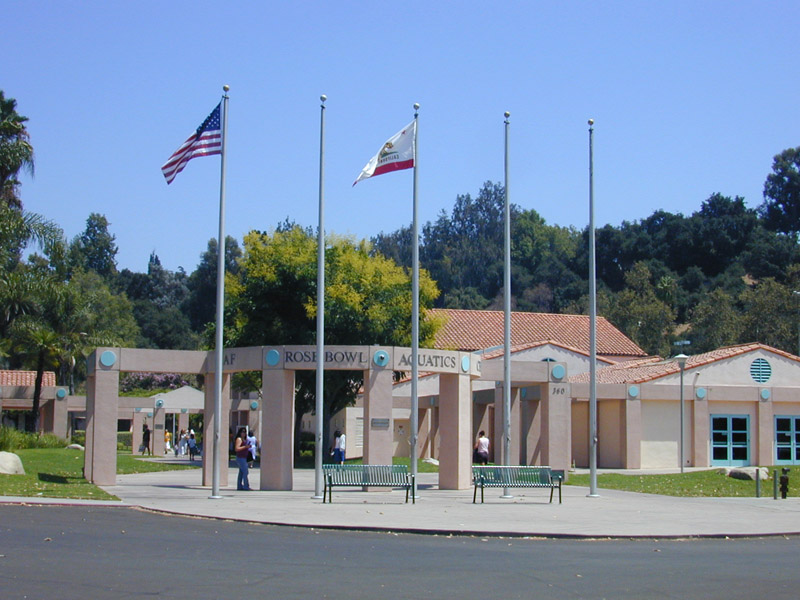
Rose Bowl Aquatics Center

The Rose Bowl Aquatics Center is a pool facility located in Pasadena, California, adjacent to the Rose Bowl Stadium. It is best known as the training facility for the Rose Bowl Aquatics swim club, as well as Rose Bowl Masters swimming, Rose Bowl diving teams, and the Rose Bowl water polo club. It will host the diving competition at the 2028 Summer Olympics.

== History ==
The Rose Bowl Aquatics Center opened in 1990 in the former site of the city's defunct Brookside Plunge. The project was funded with a $4.5-million city loan and $2 million in private donations, including a crucial final $430,000 from Pasadena neighbor, Eugene Scott, who was also vice-chairman of the Board of the Rose Bowl Aquatics Center and one of its founding directors.

== Events and usage ==
=== 2028 Summer Olympics ===
During the 2028 Summer Olympics, the venue will stage the diving competition. The LA84 Foundation/John C. Argue Swim Stadium was initially slated to host diving but was moved to Pasadena for logistical reasons. The venue will temporarily close in April 2027 for renovations as it prepares for the Olympic diving competition. It will reopen to the public in the fall of 2028 after the conclusion of the Olympics.

=== Use by Olympic teams ===
The pools hosted the final practices of the 2000 US Olympic swimming and diving team. In 2008, the facility held the US National Diving Championships. The USA Men's water polo team held a training game vs. the Croatia team at the Rose Bowl Aquatics Center on June 1, 2012, prior to the 2012 Olympics.

=== Water polo ===
Collegiate men's water polo competitions have been held for many years at the aquatics center. It was the home-away-home of the UCLA men's water polo team.

=== In popular culture ===
The famous cover art to Nirvana's Nevermind album, a photo of a baby floating in a pool, was shot at the center. In 2008, the photo was recreated at the center by the same person as a teenager. ABC's TV show Splash was filmed at the center.

== Rose Bowl Aquatics swim club ==
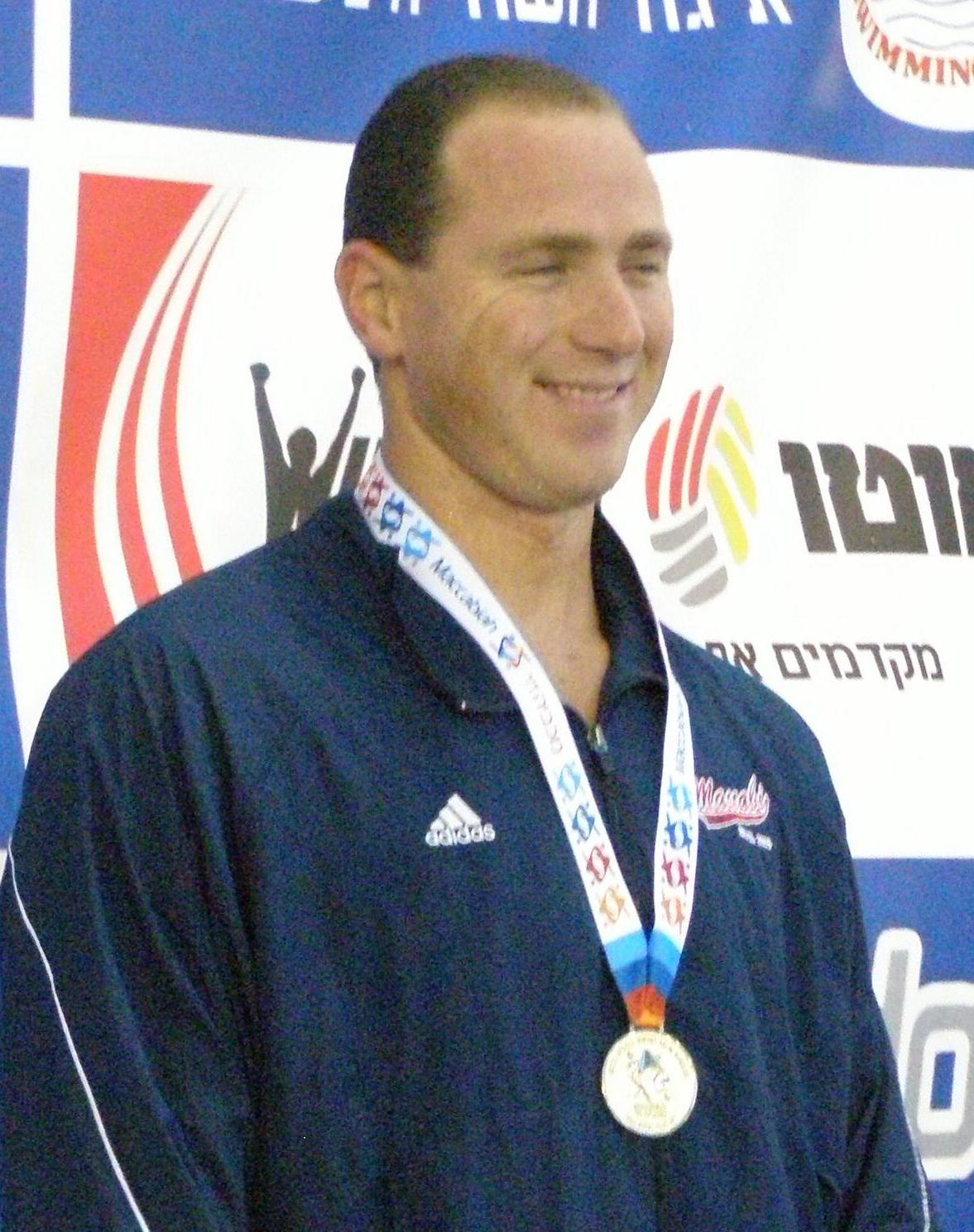
Jason Lezak

The Rose Bowl Aquatics swim club is home to many well-known athletes, including Jason Lezak, Emily Adamczyk, and Kevin Kuhn. All three athletes have qualified for the world champions trials teams. Kristine Quance, an Olympic gold medalist, is currently a coach with the team.

Rose Bowl Masters Swimming Team consisting of ex-Olympians, former NCAA champions, and those with a desire to compete, coached by Chad Durieux, who placed 4th overall in the 2010 SPMA Short Course Meters Masters Championships at Belmont Plaza.
