= 1932 Summer Olympics =

Multi-sport event in Los Angeles, California, US

Games of the X Olympiad
- Emblem of the 1932 Summer Olympics
- Location: Los Angeles, United States
- Motto: Citius, Altius, Fortius (English: Swifter, Higher, Stronger.)
- Nations: 37
- Athletes: 1,332 (1,206 men, 126 women)
- Events: 117 in 14 sports (20 disciplines)
- Opening: July 30, 1932
- Closing: August 14, 1932
- Opened by: Vice President Charles Curtis
- Stadium: Los Angeles Memorial Coliseum

The 1932 Summer Olympics (officially the Games of the X Olympiad and also known as Los Angeles 1932) were an international multi-sport event held from July 30 to August 14, 1932, in Los Angeles, California, United States. The Games were held during the worldwide Great Depression, with some nations not traveling to Los Angeles as a result; 37 countries competed, compared to the 46 at the 1928 Games in Amsterdam, (Note: Nations competing at the Amsterdam Olympics but not the 1932 Los Angeles Games were Bulgaria, Chile, Cuba, Egypt, Lithuania, Luxembourg, Malta, Panama, Rhodesia, Romania and Turkey.) and even then-U.S. President Herbert Hoover did not attend the Games. (Note: Hoover, who also skipped the 1932 Winter Olympics in Lake Placid, New York, was the second U.S. president to miss a Games in the United States held during his term. The first was President Theodore Roosevelt, who decided not to attend the 1904 Summer Olympics, held in St. Louis, Missouri, because St. Louis mayor David R. Francis declined to let Roosevelt help officiate.) The organizing committee was led by William May Garland, a local sports enthusiast and real estate developer.

Los Angeles will host the Summer Olympics for the third time in 2028, becoming the third city in the world—following London and Paris—to do so.

== Host city selection ==
The selection of the host city for the 1932 Summer Olympics was made at the 23rd IOC Session in Rome, Italy, in 1923. Remarkably, the selection process consisted of a single bid, from Los Angeles's Olympic bid Committee led by William May Garland, and as there were no bids from any other city, Los Angeles was selected by default to host the 1932 Games.

== Development and preparations ==
=== Budget ===
Los Angeles was awarded the games on April 9, 1923. William May Garland led the Organizing Committee for the Olympic Games (OCOG), officially titled the "Xth Olympiad Committee" with a staff of 70 employees. The Games were originally heavily backed by local corporate interests and L.A. business elites. They were primarily underwritten by a US $1 million (equivalent to US $19.19 million in 2025) state bond act, the “California Olympic Bond Act of 1927″. Later approved as "Proposition 2" by CA voters with 73% of the vote in 1928. The OCOG raised funds from various sources. 1,247,580 million event tickets sold, 42.4% of venues capacity bringing in US $1.48 million (equivalent to US $28.46 million in 2025). A total of 331,518 programs were sold at ten cents each, bringing in over US $33,152 (equivalent to US $636,301.33 in 2025). The OCOG received a share of venue concessions run by a local firm at each venue bringing in sales revenue. The OCOG charged US $2 (equivalent to US $38.39 in 2025) a day for male athletes and coaches to stay at the Olympic Village. Lastly, corporate sponsors like, Omega, Helms Bakery and Coca-Cola provided a revenue source.

Most venues were rented out or leased at no cost to the OCOG. The OCOG paid for the dredging of Alamitos Bay in Long Beach for rowing events. They paid for the Olympic Village, a pool for swimming events and paid for temporary stands at city parks and golf courses used. Including concessions, post-games equipment sales and the bond, estimates of earnings have been placed as high as US $2.7 million (equivalent to US $51.82 million in 2025). The OCOG did not report the financial details of the Games, although contemporary newspapers stated that the Games had made a profit of US $1 million (equivalent to US $19.19 million in 2025) at closing ceremony.

=== Security ===
Los Angeles Police (LAPD) Chief Roy E. Steckel and the four other committee members deployed 650 police officers dedicated to traffic control every day of the Games. The Chief ordered police officers to work 12-hour days and to postpone vacations. 150 university students assisted the police as traffic officers. The L.A.P.D. employed 800 duly sworn police officers. According to the L.A.P.D.'s official site, crime was very low during the Olympics.

=== Transportation ===
Automobiles were the primary method of transportation. The DeSoto Six Sedan, a part of General Motors was named the official car of the Olympic Village. A five-member traffic committee was organized by the OCOG with the Los Angeles Police Department (LAPD) and traffic management experts. Athletes were transported in sixty eight bus carriages to competition venues and the Olympic Village in Baldwin Hills. Police escorts were provided by LAPD. The OCOG urged attendees to use the red car trolleys to avoid congestion at venues, the Pacific Electric trolleys were the largest rail network in the world at the turn of the century.

=== Venues ===
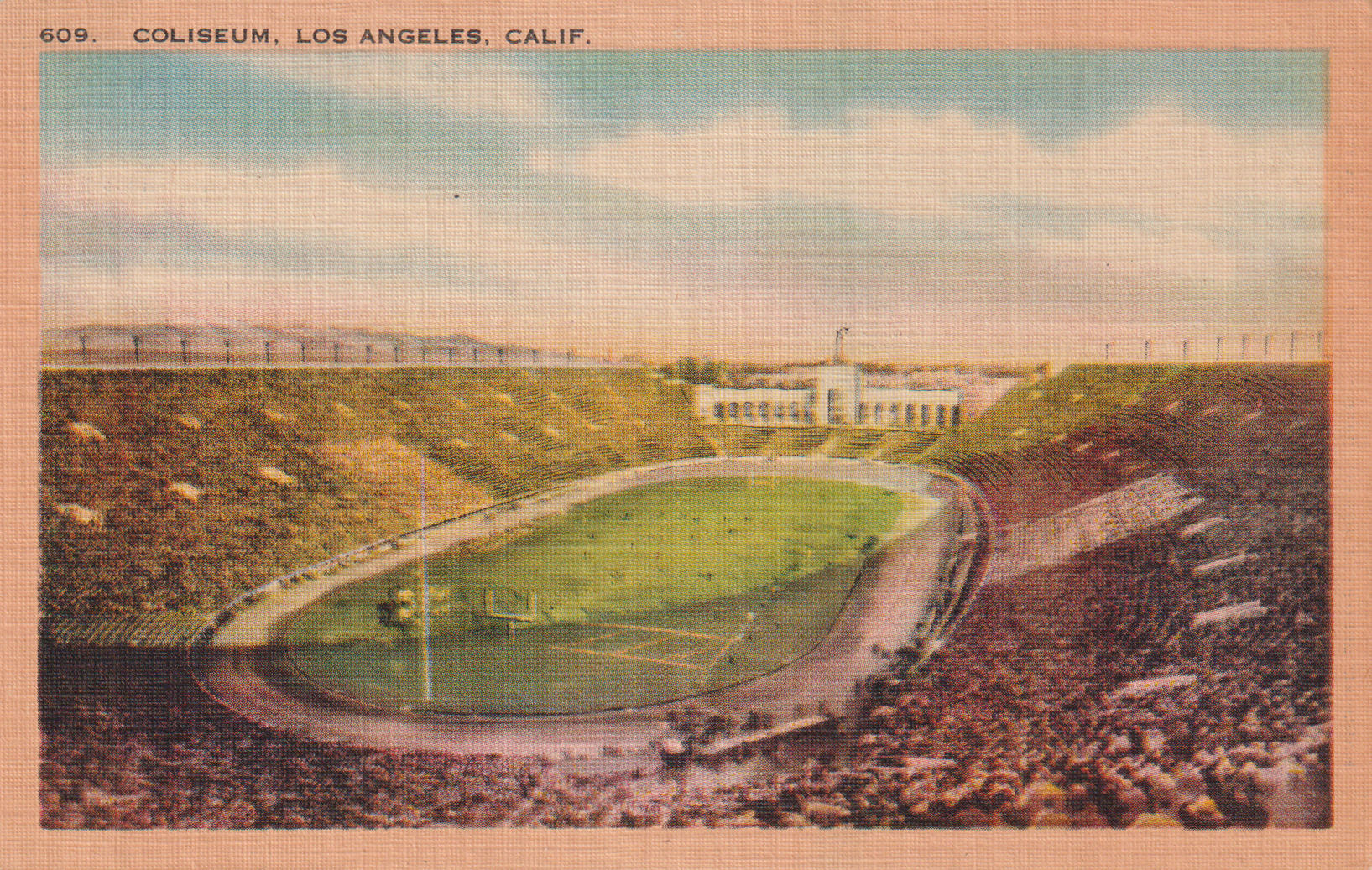
The Los Angeles Memorial Coliseum hosted ceremonies, athletics, equestrian and field hockey events.

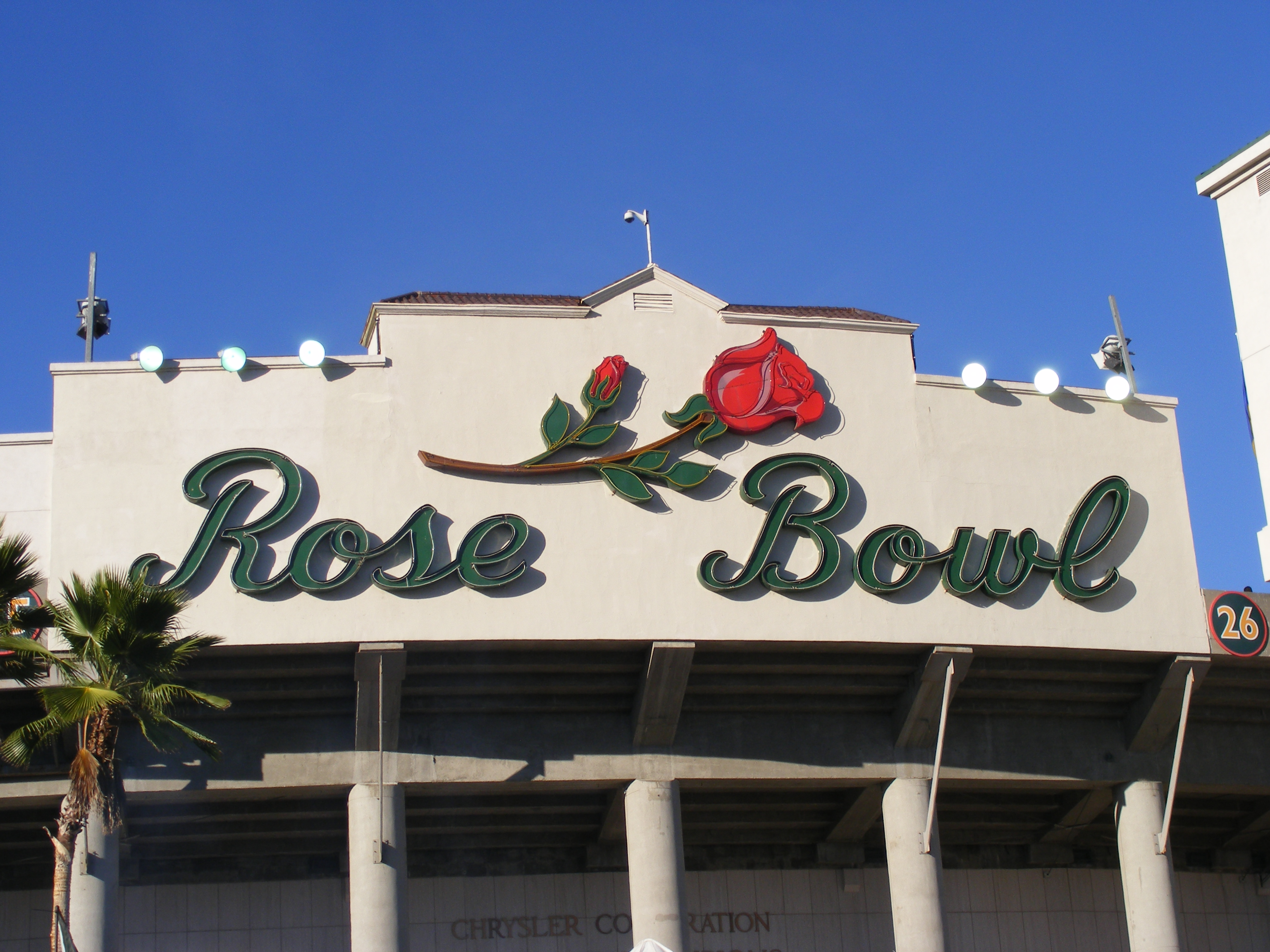
The Rose Bowl hosted the track cycling events.

Fifteen sports venues were used for the 1932 Summer Olympics. In order to control costs in the wake of the Great Depression, existing venues were used. They included two golf courses, two city parks, three public highways, and a city road. The Swimming Stadium was the only new venue constructed for these games.

The Rose Bowl, constructed in 1921, was made into a temporary velodrome for track cycling events under the auspices of the Union Cycliste Internationale (UCI).

The Los Angeles Memorial Coliseum, constructed in 1923, was used as the Olympic Stadium.

The Olympic Auditorium was constructed in 1924 in preparation for Los Angeles being awarded the Games; it was modified to meet the specifications of the boxing, weightlifting, and wrestling federations.

Long Beach Marine Stadium was created in 1925 when Alamitos Bay was dredged, then further dredged seven years later in time for the 1932 Games.

Elysian Park, the oldest city park in Los Angeles, was founded in 1886, and has been part of the Los Angeles Police Department (LAPD) training academy since 1925.

The Riviera Country Club opened in 1926 as the Los Angeles Athletic Club Golf Course and was renamed Riviera by the time of the 1932 Games.

Equestrian events were held in various locations. The equestrian cross country route was designed by U.S. Cavalry officers John Burke Barry and Sloan Doak, members of the IFE and former Olympians. It was known for being brutally difficult and bisecting multiple rural highways, starting from the Riviera Country Club, thru Santa Monica, West Los Angeles, the Olympic Village and ending at Sunset Fields Gold Club. Named the "Westchester course", although the course did not enter the modern-day neighborhood boundaries of Westchester. Dressage was held at the Riviera Country Club and show jumping at the Coliseum.

The Swimming Stadium, constructed adjacent to the Coliseum in 1932, was intended to be a temporary structure.

Riverside Drive, Los Angeles Avenue, Vineyard Avenue, and the Pacific Coast Highway were common driving routes in California at the time of the 1932 Games

LA introduced the first Olympic Village, providing housing for male athletes. The accommodations provided in Los Angeles Baldwin Hills neighborhood is considered to be the first official modern Olympic Village, with a capacity of 2,000 people and located to the west of the city. Consisting of a group of buildings with rooms to lodge athletes (men only), as well as providing a place to eat and train, it serves as the model for today's Olympic Villages. It also provided certain community services for the first time, including a hospital, a fire station, and a post office. Female athletes were housed at the Chapman Park Hotel on Wilshire Boulevard

Venue	City/Neighborhood	Sports	Capacity	Ref.
Olympic Stadium (Los Angeles Memorial Coliseum)	Exposition Park (Los Angeles)	Athletics, Equestrian (eventing, jumping), Field hockey, Gymnastics	105,000	
Swimming Stadium (LA84 Foundation/John C. Argue Swim Stadium)	Exposition Park (Los Angeles)	Diving, Modern pentathlon (swimming), Swimming, Water polo	10,000	
160th Regiment State Armory (Wallis Annenberg Building)	Exposition Park (Los Angeles)	Fencing, Modern pentathlon (fencing)	1,800	
Grand Olympic Auditorium (Glory Church of Jesus Christ Building)	Downtown Los Angeles (Los Angeles)	Boxing, Weightlifting, Wrestling	10,000.	
Los Angeles Police Pistol Range (Los Angeles Police Academy)	Elysian Park (Los Angeles)	Modern pentathlon (shooting), Shooting	Not listed	
Riverside Drive at Griffith Park	Los Feliz (Los Angeles)	Athletics (50 km walk)	Not listed	
Riviera Country Club	Pacific Palisades (Los Angeles)	Equestrian (dressage, eventing), Modern pentathlon (riding)	9,500	
Sunset Fields Golf Club	Baldwin Hills (Los Angeles)	Equestrian (cross country), Modern pentathlon (running)	Not listed	
"Westchester Course"	Riviera Country Club (start)/ (thru) West Los Angeles/ (end) Sunset Fields Golf Club (Los Angeles)	Equestrian (cross country)	Not listed	
Los Angeles Harbor	San Pedro (Los Angeles)	Sailing	Not listed	
Long Beach Marine Stadium	Long Beach	Rowing	17,000	
Los Angeles Avenue / Vineyard Avenue / Pacific Coast Highway	Moorpark (start) / (thru) Oxnard, Santa Monica (end)	Cycling (road)	Not listed	
Rose Bowl	Pasadena	Cycling (track)	85,000	

=== Olympic Arts Festival ===
The Art competitions at the 1932 Summer Olympics awarded medals for works inspired by sport-related themes in five categories: architecture, literature, music, painting, and sculpture.

=== Olympic Music ===
American pianist Walter Bradley-Keeler composed "Hymne Olympique", an anthem written specifically for the Xth Olympiad. The IOC would make it the official anthem before the current Olympic anthem was created in 1958.

=== Tickets ===
Opening ceremony tickets were sold for US $3 (equivalent to US $57.58 in 2025) each. Events tickets ranged between US $1 (equivalent to US $19.19 in 2025) to US $3 (equivalent to US $57.58 in 2025) per individual event. A US $22 (equivalent to US $422.26 in 2025) pass was available to enter the Coliseum for all events. Children's tickets were available for US $0.5 (equivalent to US $9.6 in 2025) cents for all events.

== Marketing ==
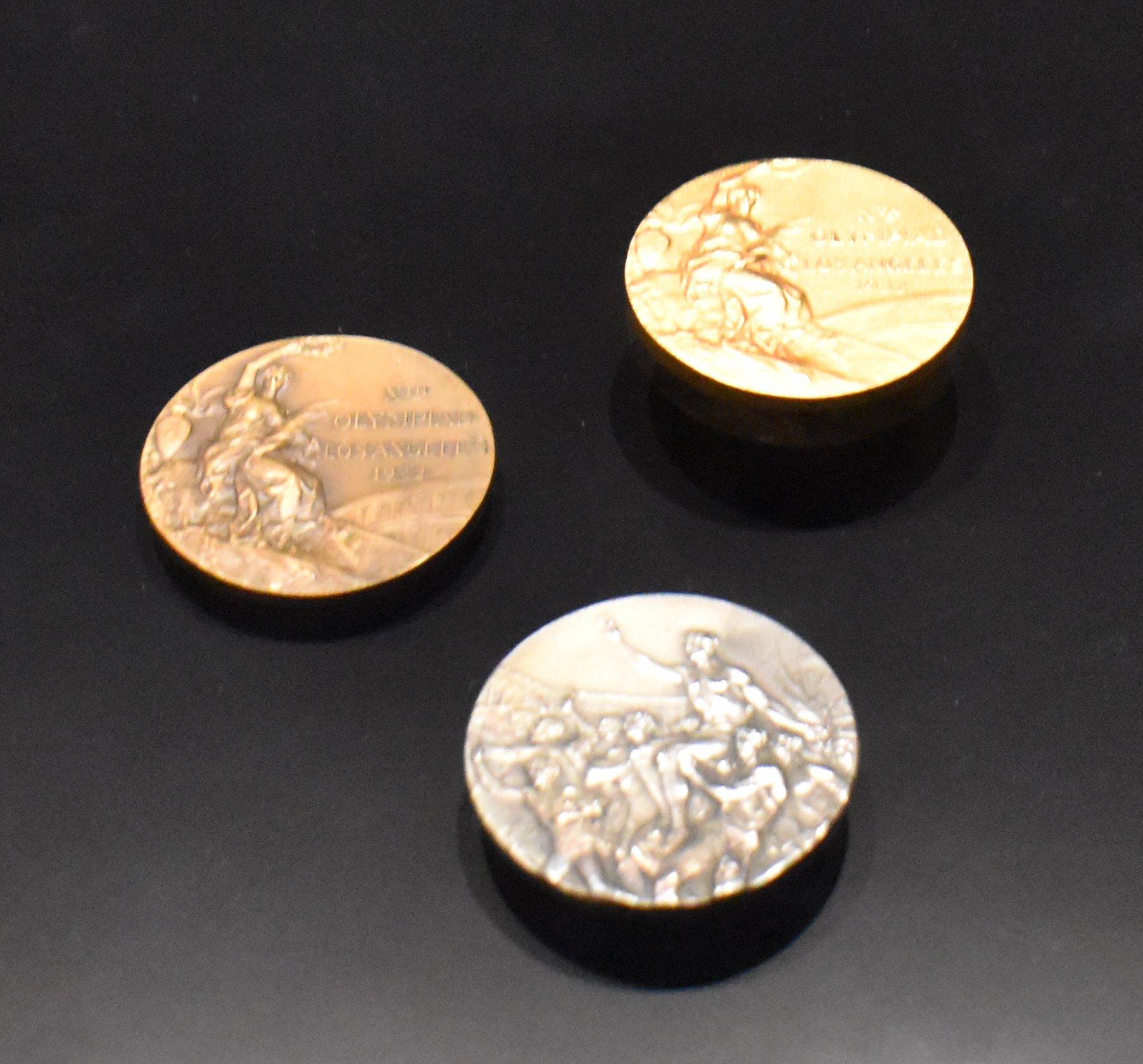
1932 Olympics Medals with the traditional Trionfo design.

=== Emblem and Branding ===
The emblem was created by Harry Muir Kurtzworth and the OCOG's in-house art department. It featured the coat of arms of the United States holding the Olympic rings, along with the Olympic motto Citius, Altius, Fortius (Faster, Higher, Stronger) and a laurel branch.

The main colors used were red, white and blue, representing the flag of the United States.

Main Colors	:	Red	White	Blue

For the first time, colors were assigned to each sport discipline. Colors were used for programs, badges, athlete identifications and event venue branding. Although not a sport discipline, the Art Festival was assigned "Mocha Brown" as the designated color.

Sport Discipline	Color assigned	Sport Discipline	Color assigned
Athletics	Sunset Orange	Modern Pentathlon	Magenta-Red
Boxing	Crimson-Red	Rowing	Vivid Blue
Cycling	Earthy Brown	Sailing	Dark Green
Equestrian	Dark Navy Blue	Shooting	Warm Orange
Fencing	Dusty Pink	Swimming	Teal
Gymnastics	Pink	Wrestling	Light Yellow
Field Hockey	Olive Green	Weightlifting	Beige

=== Mascot ===
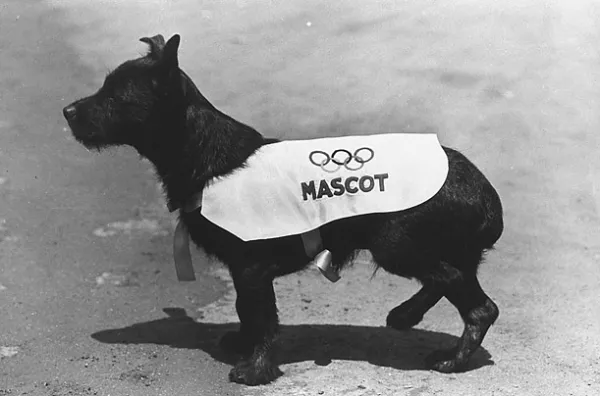

An Olympic mascot, Scottish Terrier Smoky, was featured for the first time in history, albeit unofficially.

=== Corporate sponsorship ===
The games introduced consumer culture to the Olympics, relying on local corporate sponsorships and partnerships with the Hollywood film industry of the time. Iconic brands like Coca-Cola expanded their early Olympic presence in 1932 serving as the "official soft drink" of the Games. Local baked goods maker Helms Bakery provided baked food items, including Helms Olympic Bread, the "official baker"." Omega SA also debuted as the "official timekeeper" of the games; they provided one watchmaker and thirty chronographs for officials. The Jeffries Printing Co. was the official printing supplier for the games.

== Participating nations ==
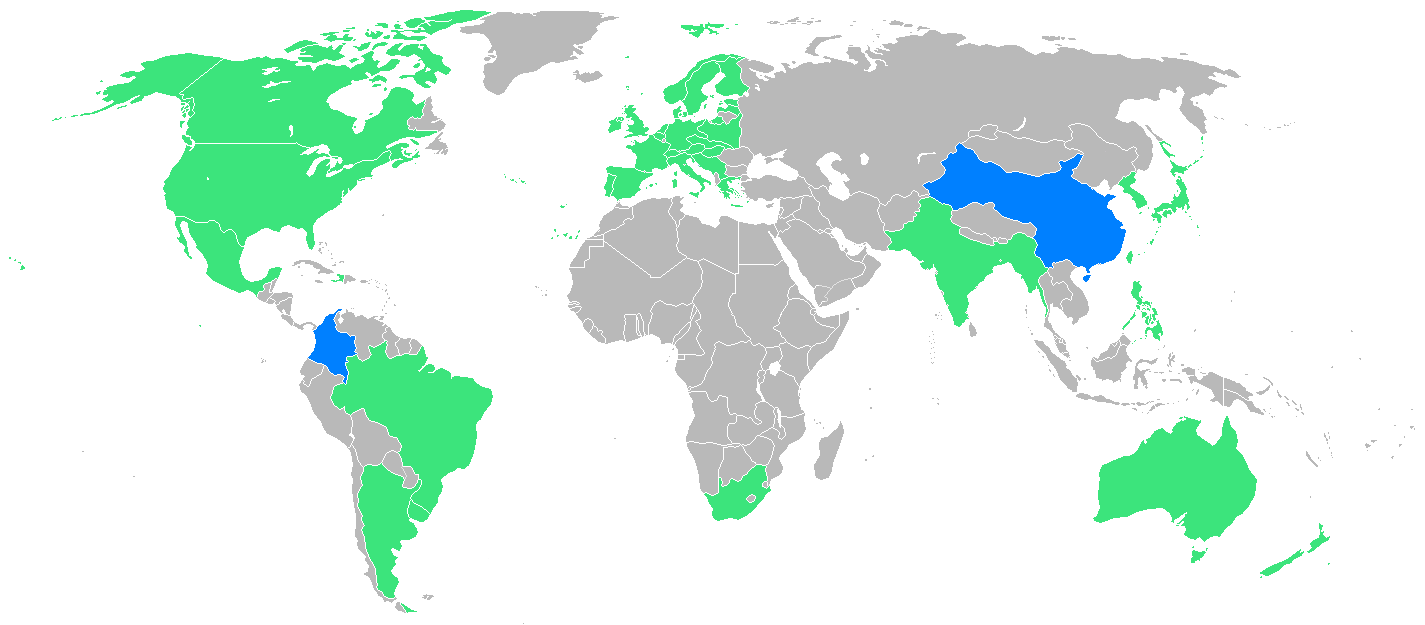
Participants (blue = first-time)

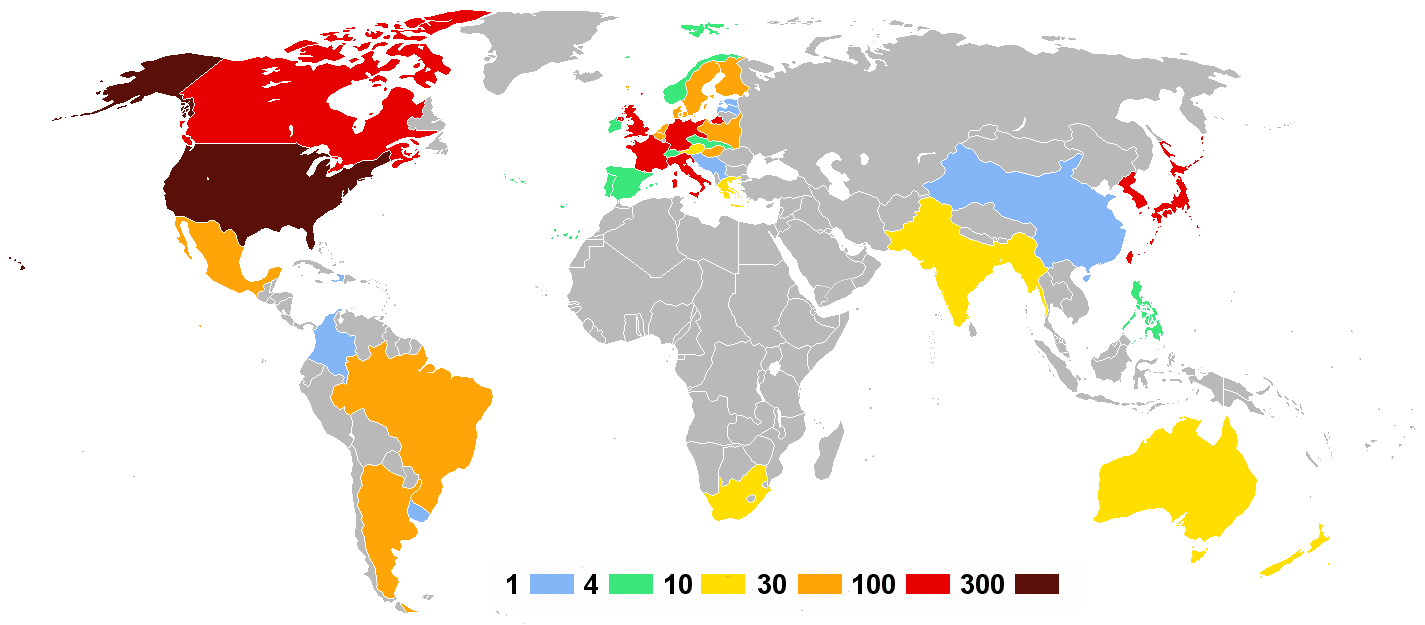
Number of athletes

A total of 37 nations were represented at the 1932 Games. Colombia made its first appearance at the Olympic Games, and the Republic of China competed for the first time after its failed appearance at the 1924 Games.

Participating National Olympic Committees
- Argentina (32)
- Australia (12)
- Austria (19)
- Belgium (36)
- Brazil (82)
- Canada (102)
- Republic of China (1)
- Colombia (1)
- Czechoslovakia (7)
- Denmark (43)
- Estonia (2)
- Finland (40)
- France (103)
- Germany (134)
- Great Britain (108)
- Greece (10)
- Haiti (2)
- Hungary (58)
- India (19)
- Ireland (8)
- Italy (112)
- Japan (157)
- Latvia (2)
- Mexico (73)
- Netherlands (45)
- New Zealand (21)
- Norway (5)
- Philippines (8)
- Poland (51)
- Portugal (6)
- South Africa (12)
- Spain (6)
- Sweden (81)
- Switzerland (6)
- United States (474) (host)
- Uruguay (1)
- Yugoslavia (1)

=== Number of athletes by National Olympic Committees ===
Country	Athletes	
United States	474	
Germany	144	
Japan	131	
Italy	112	
Great Britain	108	
France	103	
Canada	102	
Sweden	81	
Mexico	73	
Brazil	67	
Hungary	58	
Poland	51	
Netherlands	45	
Denmark	43	
Finland	40	
Belgium	36	
Argentina	33	
New Zealand	21	
Austria	19	
India	19	
Australia	13	
South Africa	12	
Greece	10	
Ireland	8	
Philippines	8	
Czechoslovakia	7	
Norway	7	
Spain	7	
Portugal	6	
Switzerland	6	
Colombia	2	
Estonia	2	
Haiti	2	
Latvia	2	
Uruguay	2	
Republic of China	1	
Yugoslavia	1	
Total		1,332

== Calendar ==
For the first time, all discipline events were held within 16 days, 3 weekends within the opening and closing ceremonies. A pattern that has been kept ever since. No previous Summer Olympics had lasted less than 79 days. LAOOC organized 117 events in 14 sports across 20 disciplines. As none of the equestrian teams managed to have three riders finish the Team jumping event course on the 14th day of August, no team medal was awarded.

All dates are in Pacific Standard Time (UTC-7)

OC	Opening ceremony	●	Event competitions	1	Gold medal events	CC	Closing ceremony

July/August 1932		30th Sat	31st Sun	1st Mon	2nd Tue	3rd Wed	4th Thu	5th Fri	6th Sat	7th Sun	8th Mon	9th Tue	10th Wed	11th Thu	12th Fri	13th Sat	14th Sun	Events
Ceremonies		OC															CC	—N/a
Aquatics	Diving										1	●	1	●	1	1		16
Aquatics	Swimming								●	1	1	1	1	1	2	4		16
Aquatics	Water polo						●		●	●	●	●		●	1			16
Athletics			4	3	3	5	4	4	2	5								29
Boxing												●	●	●	●	8		8
Cycling	Road cycling			1	1	1												6
Cycling	Track cycling			1	1	1												6
Equestrian													2	●	●	2	2	6
Fencing								●	●	●	●	7						7
Field hockey							●	●	●	●	●	●	●	1				1
Gymnastics											1	2	3	5				11
Modern pentathlon					●	●	●	●	1									1
Rowing												●	●	●	●	7		7
Sailing								●	●	●	●	●	4					4
Shooting															1	1		2
Weightlifting		3	2															5
Wrestling				●	●	7	●	●	●	7								14
Daily medal events		3	6	5	5	14	4	4	3	13	3	10	11	7	5	22	2	117
Cumulative total		3	9	14	19	33	37	41	44	57	60	70	81	88	93	115	116	117
July/August 1932		30th Sat	31st Sun	1st Mon	2nd Tue	3rd Wed	4th Thu	5th Fri	6th Sat	7th Sun	8th Mon	9th Tue	10th Wed	11th Thu	12th Fri	13th Sat	14th Sun	Total events

== The Games ==
=== Ceremonies ===
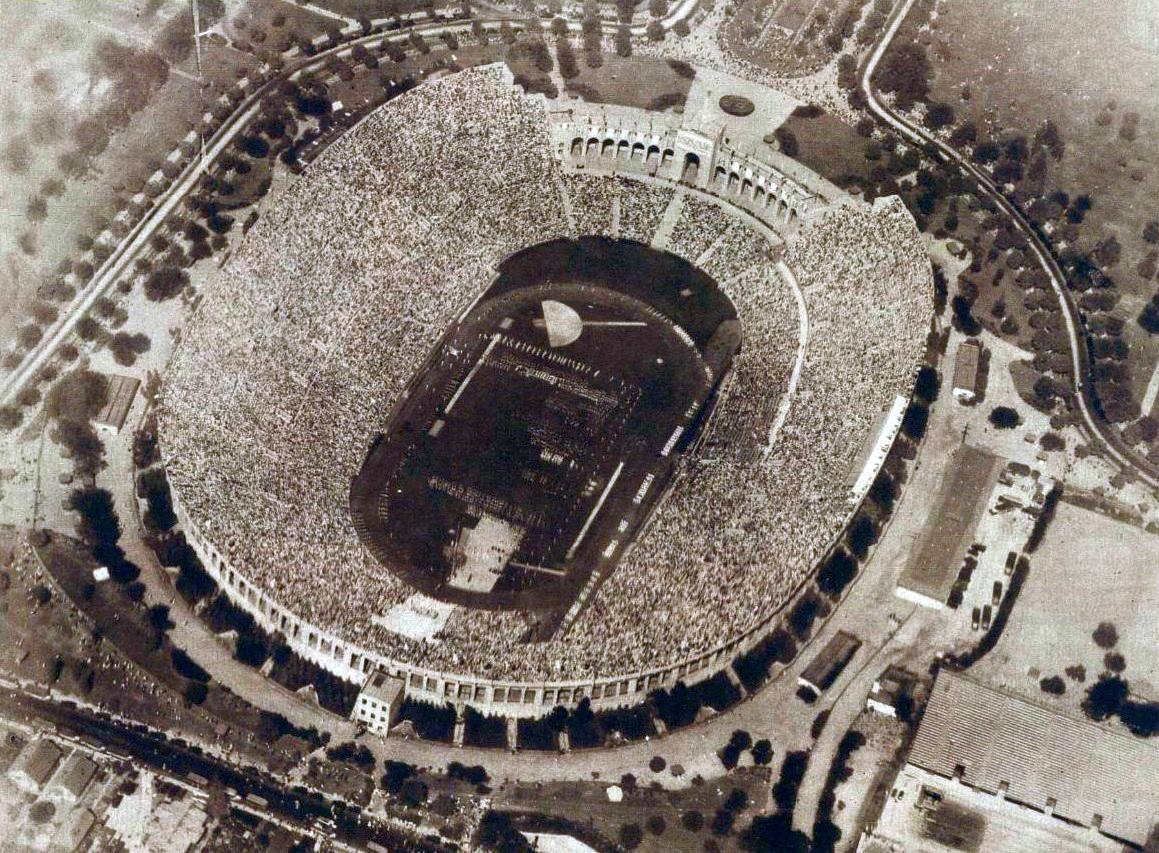
The Coliseum during the opening ceremony

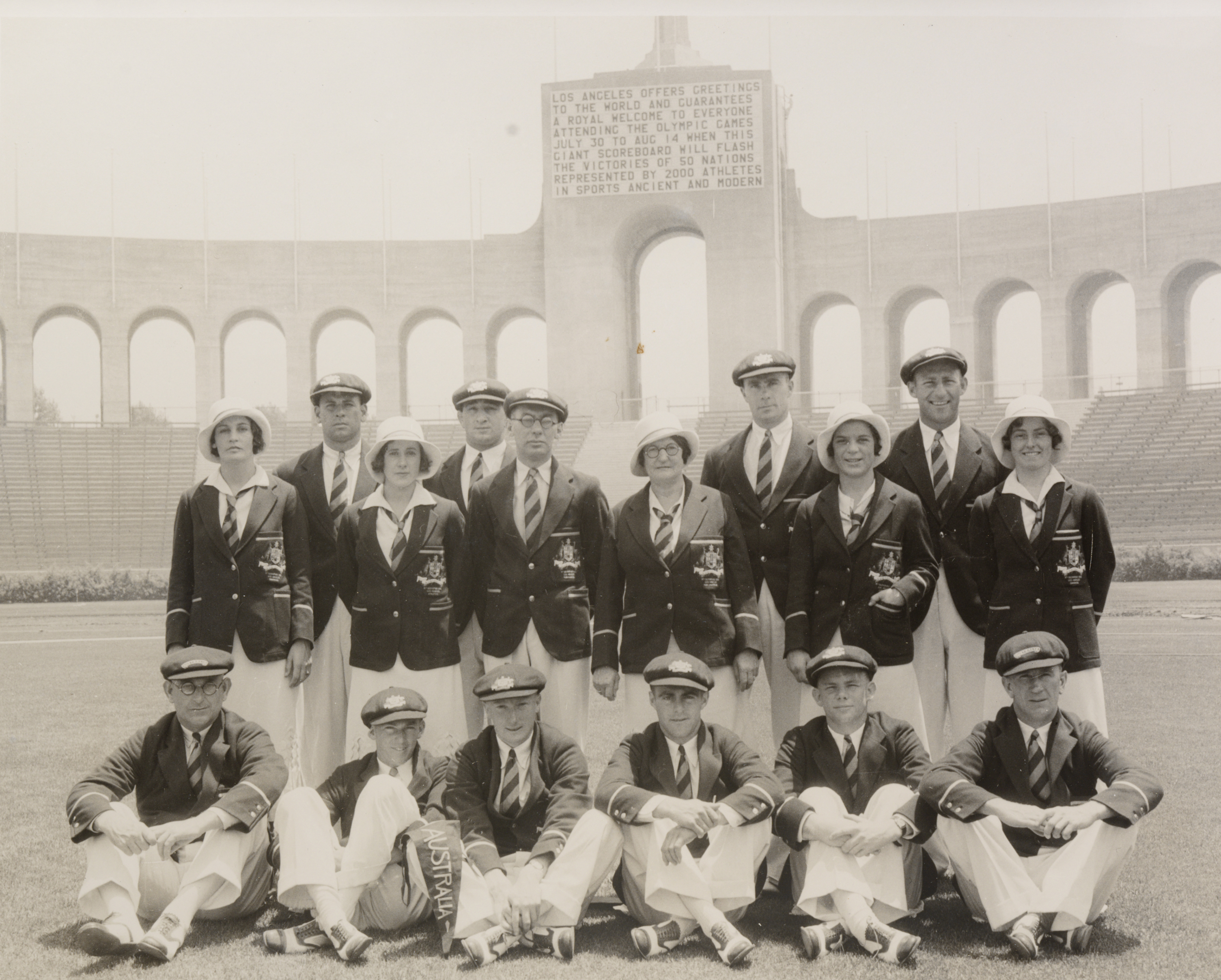
The Australian Olympic Team at the Olympic Stadium, Los Angeles, 1932

==== Opening ====
Attended by 101,022 people. The ceremony included a 300-person orchestra, and a choir of 1,200 singers. Organizing committee President William May Garland provided opening remarks of welcome on behaf of California and the City of Los Angeles before introducing Vice President Curtis to officially open the games.

"In the name of the President of the United States, I proclaim open the Olympic Games of Los Angeles, celebrating the X Olympiad of the modern era."

— Charles Curtis, Vice-President of the United States of America

The ceremony lasted two hours, 2,000 athletes, coaches, and officials from 37 nations participated. Also, 800 journalists, including 200 from abroad were issued press passes.

==== Closing ====
The closing ceremony was celebrated on Sunday, August 14, 1932, also at the Coliseum. The coliseum hosted Equestrian (Prix des Nations) Jumping and dressage events at 2:30 PM. After the conclusion of the event, the crowd of just under 100,000 remained to witness the closure of the games.

The games orchestra was present, they commenced the start of the parade of nations at sunset. Placards with country names with their respected flag entered the Coliseum. Once complete, IOC president Billet-Latour proclaimed the "youth of the world to assemble in Berlin", in four years time. The Olympic flag was lowered and presented to Major George van Rossem, President of the Dutch Olympic committee, he then forwarded the flag to the IOC president who then gave it to Los Angeles Mayor Porter, to safe keep until the next Olympic Games in Berlin. Trumpets, fanfare and cannons boomed as the nations flags exited the stadium. The orchestra played "Aloha ʻOe", a farewell song as the remaining flag bearer exited. The orchestra then played "taps", the olympic flame was extinguished ending the ceremony and the games.

=== Sports ===
117 events in 20 disciplines, comprising 14 sports, were part of the Olympic program in 1932. Football was introduced in Paris 1900 Games. Following Jules Rimet's proposal in 1929 to initiate a professional World Championship tournament of football, the sport was then dropped from the 1932 Games by FIFA in an attempt to promote the new World Cup tournament of 1930. Football returned for the 1936 Games in Berlin. In one of two Equestrian jumping events (team competitions) no medals were awarded. The number of events in each discipline is noted in parentheses.

- Aquatics
  - Diving (4)
  - Swimming (11)
  - Water polo (1)
- Athletics (29)
- Boxing (8)
- Cycling
  - Road (2)
  - Track (4)
- Equestrian
  - Dressage (2)
  - Eventing (2)
  - Show jumping (2)
- Fencing (7)
- Field hockey (1)
- Gymnastics (11)
- Modern pentathlon (1)
- Rowing (7)
- Sailing (4)
- Shooting (2)
- Weightlifting (5)
- Wrestling
  - Freestyle (7)
  - Greco-Roman (7)

=== Demonstration sports ===
- American football (1)
- Lacrosse (1)

=== Athletic achievements ===
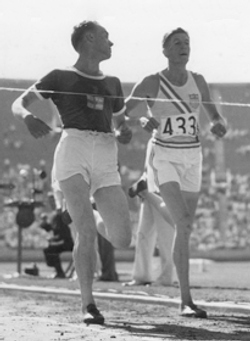
Lauri Lehtinen (left) and Ralph Hill finishing the 5000 m race at the 1932 Olympics

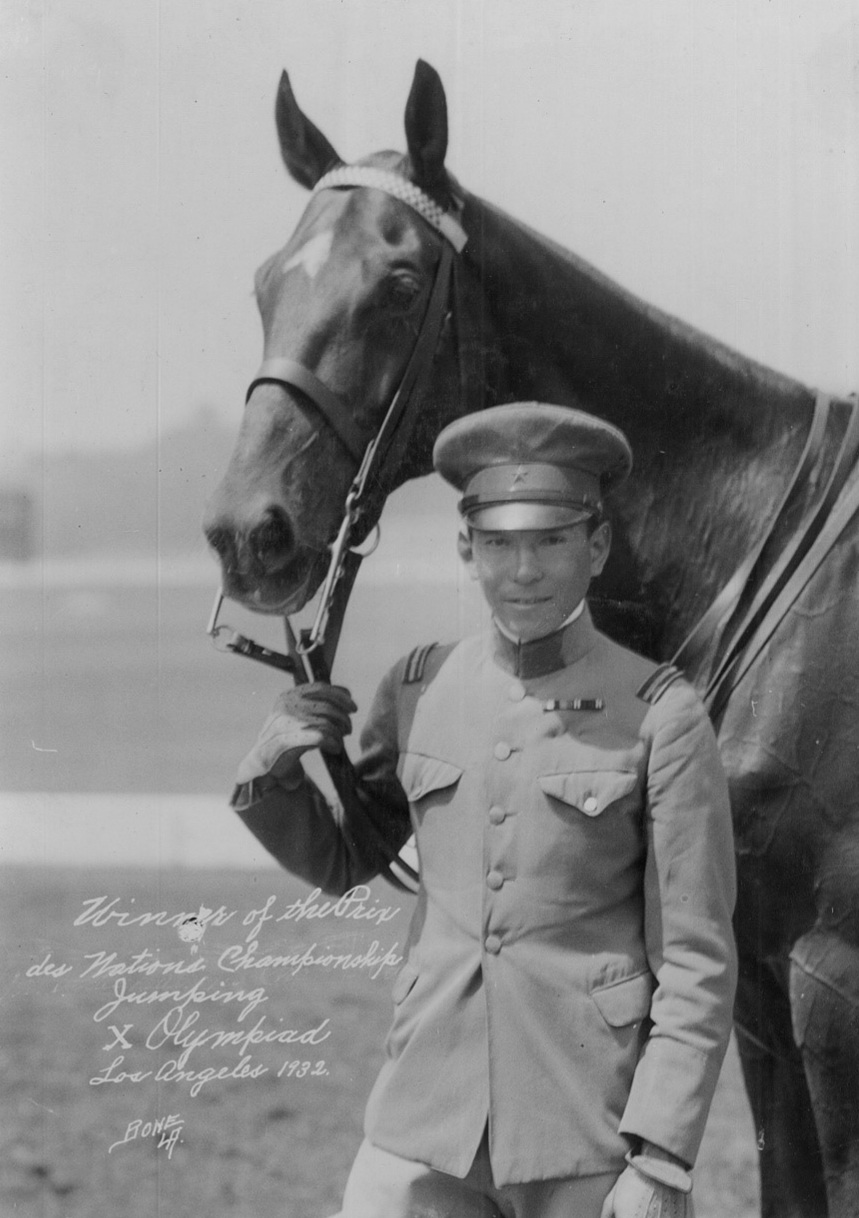
Takeichi Nishi with Olympic steed, Uranus

- In athletics, Babe Didrikson of the United States won two gold medals in the javelin and the hurdles event. She also competed in a jump-off for a gold in the high jump. Her technique in the jump-off was ruled illegal, leaving Didrikson with second place.
- Finland's Paavo Nurmi was suspended from competition by the IAAF for alleged violation of amateur rules. Finns charged that the Swedish officials had used devious tricks in their campaign against Nurmi's amateur status, and ceased all athletic relations with Sweden. A year earlier, controversies on the track and in the press had led Finland to withdraw from the Finland-Sweden athletics international. After Nurmi's suspension, Finland did not agree to return to the event until 1939.
- American Eddie Tolan won both the 100 m and 200 m sprint events, and became the first Black athlete to be receive the title of the "world's fastest human" as a result of this unique double. Poland's Stanisława Walasiewicz won the gold medal in the women's 100 m; she also won the silver medal in the event four years later. After her death in 1980, it was discovered that she was intersex and would have been ineligible to participate under modern rules.
- Due to an official's error, the 3,000 m steeplechase went for 3,460 m, or one extra lap.
- Several women's events debuted at these games, among them the 80 meters hurdles and javelin throw. American Babe Didrikson won both events and also competed in the high jump where she was controversially denied gold, leaving her with silver. Unlike men, women were only allowed to enter a maximum of three events by the IOC, and Didrikson could not compete in the discus throw, long jump, and relay where she would have likely medaled based on her prior results. Had the 200 meters and pentathlon been contested at these games (they debuted in 1964), Didrikson would have won them easily based on her performances prior to the Olympics.
- In field hockey, only three nations took part. The host nation lost both matches, 1–24 to India and 2–9 to Japan, but still won a bronze medal.
- Romeo Neri of Italy won three gold medals in gymnastics. Although women's team gymnastics debuted in the previous Olympics, the event was not held at these games; however, there were women gymnasts who traveled to Los Angeles and participated in exhibition events at the 1932 games.
- Helene Madison of the United States won three gold medals in women's swimming, while the Japanese swimmers swept the men's events and took all but one title. Kusuo Kitamura of Japan won the gold medal in the men's 1500 meter freestyle swimming race. He was and continues to be the youngest ever male swimmer to win a gold medal at the Olympic Games.
- Takeichi Nishi (Baron Nishi) was the gold medalist with his horse Uranus in the equestrian show jumping individual event. Nishi's gold medal is Japan's only gold medal in the equestrian event to this day. Nishi died in 1945 as an officer stationed in the defense of the island of Iwo Jima, and as such is an important character in Clint Eastwood's film, Letters from Iwo Jima.
- Dunc Gray won Australia's first cycling gold medal; he set a world record of 1m 13s in the 1000 time trial. The Dunc Gray Velodrome, built for the 2000 Sydney Olympic Games, was named after him.

=== Medal count ===
These are the top ten nations that won medals at the 1932 Games.

Rank	Nation	Gold	Silver	Bronze	Total
1	United States*	44	36	30	110
2	Italy	12	12	12	36
3	France	10	5	4	19
4	Sweden	9	5	9	23
5	Japan	7	7	4	18
6	Hungary	6	5	5	16
7	Finland	5	8	12	25
8	Great Britain	5	7	5	17
9	Germany	3	12	5	20
10	Australia	3	1	1	5
Totals (10 entries)		104	98	87	289

Before the 1932 Games, all the medals were awarded at the closing ceremony, with the athletes wearing evening dress for the occasion. The presenting dignitary was stationary while the athletes filed past to receive their medals. The presentation of the medals and awards varied significantly until the 1932 Summer Olympics. Los Angeles introduced protocol that has now become standard. In Los Angeles, athletes were honored by introducing the first true victory podium, the raising of the medalists' national flags, and the playing of the winner's national anthem. These ceremonies were held immediately following events at the Memorial Coliseum.

== Broadcasting rights ==
No television rights were offered as TV technology was not available until 1936. Live, real-time radio broadcasts of the Games were severely restricted. The OCOG attempted to sell the live radio feed to NBC Radio Network and CBS News Radio for US $100,000 (equivalent to US $1.92 million in 2025). They refused to pay the fee, relying instead on reports and summaries by local newspaper affiliates for a 15-minute nightly summary. The primary visual medium for the 1932 Games were theater newsreels. Spectators globally could watch highlights of events in movie theaters after the fact.

== Legacy ==
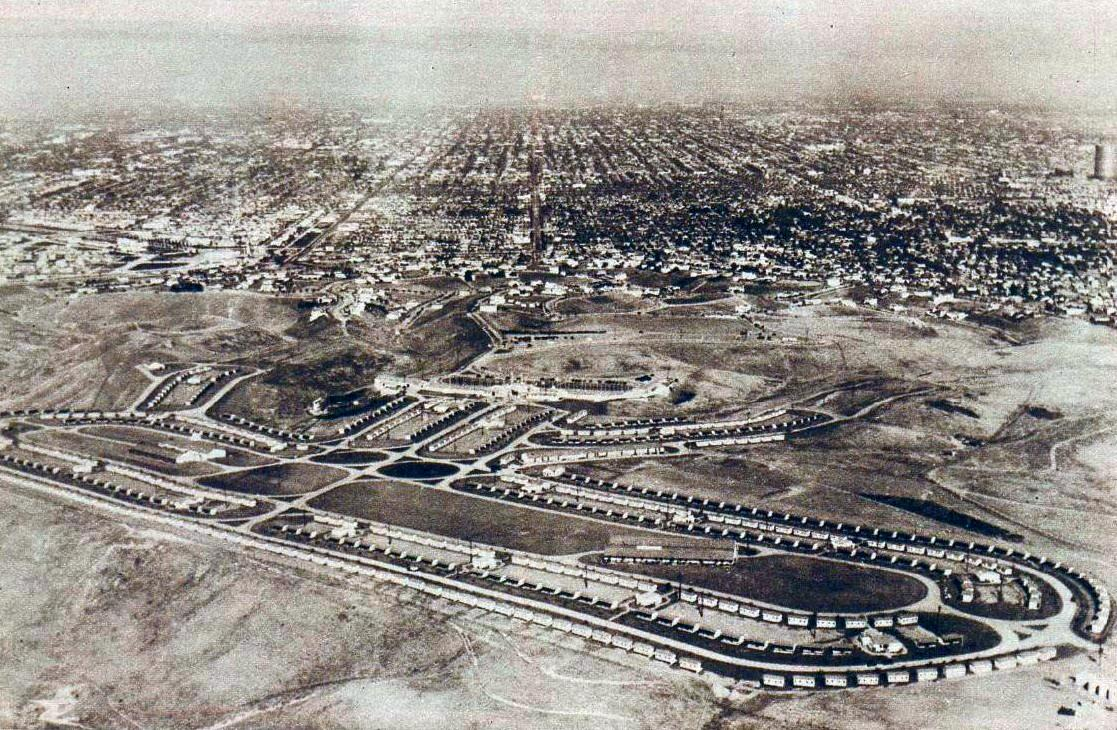
Aerial view looking north of the first official men's Olympic Village in Baldwin Hills area of Los Angeles

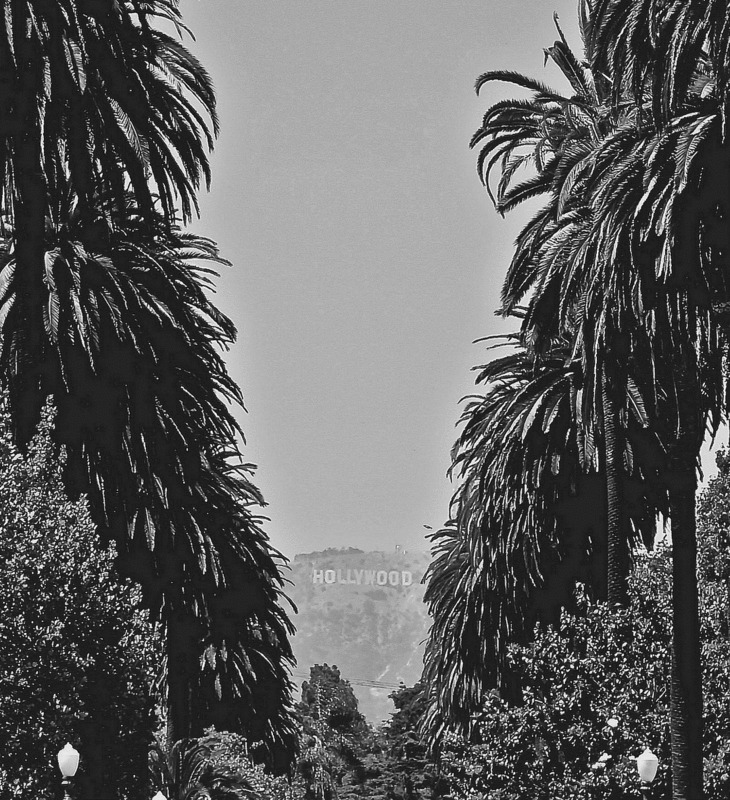
Palm Trees planted throughout Los Angeles during the 1920s

- The games were considered a success and a model for future Olympic Games. The Coliseum set attendance records, including a record 101,022 attended the opening ceremony. A record not broken until Sydney 2000 summer games.
- For the first time, the Games lasted 16 days, a pattern that has been kept ever since.
- When the OCOG announced a surplus after the games, the City of Los Angeles, The USOC and the State of California filed a lawsuit for access to the surplus. Los Angeles Superior Court ruled the surplus belonged solely to the OCOG in 1935. The Bureau of Internal Revenue reported a possible surplus was around $1.2 million. The OCOG decided to repay the state bond and then donated the rest to the local community redevelopment agency, which funded the Southern California Committee for the Olympic Games. No documentation of a final accounting was released, but re-constructed by local journalism.
- An Olympic Village was built for the first time and became a model for future games, occupied by male athletes. Was located around where L.A. city park called, Montieth Park is today in the View Park–Baldwin Hills neighborhoods.
- For the 1984 Summer Olympics, the Coliseum and the Rose Bowl were used as venues. Both will become the first stadiums to have ever hosted three different Olympiads during the 2028 Summer Olympics in Los Angeles. Other venues that were used as Olympic venues in 1932 will also host Olympic events in 2028. Those venues include Los Angeles Harbor, the Long Beach Marine Stadium and the Riviera Country Club.
- Los Angeles Harbor continues to be a major sea port in the Western United States, employing 919,000 people and generating US$39.1 billion in annual wages and tax revenues as of 2007.
- The Riveria Country Club continues to host golf events, hosting the 1948 U.S. Open and the PGA Championship in 1983 and 1995.
- The Coliseum was the first (and temporary) Los Angeles home for the National League (NL) Dodgers baseball team when it moved from Brooklyn, New York before the 1958 season. The following year, it hosted the 2nd 1959 MLB All-Star Game and games 3, 4 and 5 of the 1959 World Series. When Dodger Stadium was completed in 1962, the Dodgers moved there where they have been since. The National Football League (NFL) Los Angeles Rams used the Coliseum as its host stadium from 1946 to 1979 when it moved to Anaheim, located southeast of Los Angeles. It also hosted what became known as Super Bowl I in 1967. Even the American Football League's Chargers used the Coliseum as a venue in 1960 until their move to San Diego the following year. The Coliseum continues to host USC Trojans football games to this day, and also hosted UCLA Bruins football for a number of years. The Rams returned to the Coliseum for a span of four years from 2016 to 2019 while SoFi Stadium was being built.
- The track constructed in the Rose Bowl was given to the Tournament of Roses Association upon completion of the 1932 Games. The Bowl was expanded between 1932 and the 1984 Summer Olympics three times, increasing its capacity from 83,000 in 1931 to 104,594 in 1972. It hosted Super Bowl XI in 1977, where the Oakland Raiders defeated the Minnesota Vikings 32–14. It is the current home of UCLA Bruins football and the Rose Bowl Game, and was the home of the Major League Soccer (MLS) Los Angeles Galaxy from 1996 to 2003.
- The Swim Stadium was renovated in 2003 and continues to be in use as of the 2020s. It was originally selected to be the venue for diving at the 2028 Olympics, however the event was later relocated to the Rose Bowl Aquatics Center in Pasadena.
- Tenth Street, a major thoroughfare in Los Angeles, was renamed Olympic Boulevard in honor of the Games of the Tenth Olympiad.
- Palm trees are not native to Los Angeles. Thousands were planted for the Xth Olympiad. More than 25,000 were planted in 1931 along city boulevards. Palm trees are now common in Los Angeles.
- First olympics to use stopwatches and a photo finish camera, which enabled officials to time competitions more precise. An important innovative feature of the watches was the split-seconds function, which made it possible to record both the total elapsed time and intermediate (lap) times posted by each competitor.
- The victory podium was used for the first time at the Summer Games (a podium was also used earlier in the year at the 1932 Winter Olympics in Lake Placid). (Note: In a letter dated May 1931, the IOC president, Count Henri de Baillet-Latour, advised the organizing committees of both Summer and Winter games that athletes should "stand on three pedestals, with the centre one higher than the two others". See Martin (2000) and Olympic.org article "1932: THE PODIUM MAKES ITS OLYMPIC DEBUT".)
- Elysian Park's shooting range was left intact for the LAPD to use.
- All of the road courses were returned to public usage after the Olympics.
- The Olympic Auditorium continued to be of use for boxing and roller derby events until June 2005 when it was bought to be used as a megachurch.

== See also ==
- 1932 Winter Olympics
- Olympic Games held in the United States
  - 1904 Summer Olympics – St. Louis
  - 1932 Summer Olympics – Los Angeles
  - 1932 Winter Olympics – Lake Placid
  - 1960 Winter Olympics – Squaw Valley
  - 1980 Winter Olympics – Lake Placid
  - 1984 Summer Olympics – Los Angeles
  - 1996 Summer Olympics – Atlanta
  - 2002 Winter Olympics – Salt Lake City
  - 2028 Summer Olympics – Los Angeles
  - 2034 Winter Olympics – Salt Lake City
- List of IOC country codes

== Notes ==
Summer Olympics
Preceded by Amsterdam	X Olympiad; Los Angeles; 1932	Succeeded by Berlin
