= Deaths in July 1994 =

The following is a list of notable deaths in July 1994.

Entries for each day are listed alphabetically by surname. A typical entry lists information in the following sequence:

- Name, age, country of citizenship at birth, subsequent country of citizenship (if applicable), reason for notability, cause of death (if known), and reference.

== July 1994 ==
=== 1 ===
- Markus Barth, 78, Swiss scholar of theology.
- George Cannon, 62, Canadian pro wrestler and wrestling manager, cancer.
- Helena Grossówna, 89, Polish actress and dancer.
- Asif Maharammov, 42, Azerbaijani lieutenant colonel, tuberculosis.
- Graham Williams, 49, English rugby league footballer and coach.

=== 2 ===
- Lucio Amelio, 62, Italian art dealer, curator, and actor.
- Roberto Balado, 25, Cuban amateur boxer and Olympic champion (1992), railway accident.
- Andrés Escobar, 27, Colombian football player, homicide.
- Pat Hand, 70, Australian rules footballer.
- Maung Maung, 69, President of Burma and writer, heart attack.
- Ralph Rinzler, 59, American mandolin player, folksinger, and festival organizer.
- Marion Williams, 66, American gospel singer.

=== 3 ===
- Anton Eisgruber, 81, German Olympic skier (1936).
- Zelma Watson George, 90, American opera singer and philanthropist.
- Lew Hoad, 59, Australian tennis player, leukemia.
- Felix Kelly, 80, New Zealand-British graphic designer, painter, stage designer, and illustrator.
- John Aloysius Marshall, 66, American prelate of the Catholic Church.
- Petey Sarron, 87, American boxer.
- Héctor Xavier, 73, Mexican sketch artist.

=== 4 ===
- Almiro Bergamo, 81, Italian rower and Olympian (1936).
- Cal Cooper, 71, American baseball player (Washington Senators).
- Stevan Dohanos, 87, American artist and illustrator, pneumonia.
- Alfred Harvey, 80, American comic book publisher and comic book character creator (Richie Rich, Little Dot).
- Tex Hoyle, 72, American baseball player (Philadelphia Athletics).
- Joey Marella, 31, American professional wrestling referee, traffic collision.
- Sam Segraves, 74, American baseball player.
- Gerard C. Smith, 80, American attorney and defense expert.
- Hedda Zinner, 90, German actress, comedian, journalist and radio director.

=== 5 ===
- Vaikom Muhammad Basheer, 86, Indian independence activist and writer.
- Robert Blatt, 72, American Olympic alpine skier (1948).
- Charles Comfort, 93, Scottish-Canadian painter, sculptor, and writer.
- Dan Cunningham, 86, Australian rules footballer.
- Bernie DeViveiros, 93, American baseball player (Chicago White Sox, Detroit Tigers).
- Frank Donnellan, 86, Australian rules footballer.
- Ju Do-il, 72, North Korean army officer, politician and the personal guard of Kim Il Sung.
- Mammadali Huseynov, 72, Azerbaijani/Soviet archaeologist.
- Lennart Klingström, 78, Swedish sprint canoeist and Olympian (1948).
- Ron Law, 48, Canadian baseball player (Cleveland Indians).
- Tawfiq Ziad, 65, Palestinian Israeli politician, traffic collision.

=== 6 ===
- Alfonso Casasempere, 84, Chilean Olympic swimmer (1936).
- Geoff McQueen, 46, British television screenwriter, aneurysm.
- Cameron Mitchell, 75, American actor (Death of a Salesman, How to Marry a Millionaire, The High Chaparral), lung cancer.
- Baruch Osnia, 88, Israeli politician.
- Jim Stott, 74, English rugby player.
- Franklin F. Wing Jr., 86, American Olympic equestrian (1948).

=== 7 ===
- Aspy Adajania, 52, Indian officer and boxing administrator.
- Aaron Antonovsky, 70, Israeli-American sociologist and academic.
- Bruno Bartholome, 66, German Olympic long-distance runner (1960).
- Carlo Chiti, 69, Italian racing car and engine designer.
- Anita Garvin, 88, American stage performer and film actress.
- Friedrich August Freiherr von der Heydte, 87, German paratroop officer during World War II and academic.
- Anna Kostrova, 84, Soviet/Russian painter, graphic artist, and book illustrator.
- John S. R. Shad, 71, American diplomat and ambassador.
- Ka. Mu. Sheriff, 79, Indian writer and poet.

=== 8 ===
- Junius Driggs, 87, American businessman.
- Christian-Jaque, 89, French filmmaker, heart attack.
- Robert B. Hauser, 75, American cinematographer.
- Kim Il Sung, 82, founder and first leader of North Korea, heart attack.
- Robert Edwin Lee, 75, American playwright and lyricist.
- Lars-Eric Lindblad, 70, Swedish-American entrepreneur and explorer.
- José García Narezo, 71, Mexican painter.
- Dick Sargent, 64, American actor (Bewitched, Operation Petticoat, Down to Earth), prostate cancer.
- Luis Scally, 79, Argentine Olympic field hockey player (1948).

=== 9 ===
- Enrico Airoldi, 70, Italian Olympic bobsledder (1948).
- Trevor King, 41, British Ulster loyalist and UVF member.
- Sabby Lewis, 79, American jazz pianist, band leader, and arranger.
- Bill Mosienko, 72, Ukrainian Canadian ice hockey player (Chicago Black Hawks).
- Paul M. Naghdi, 70, Iranian-American engineer, lung cancer.
- Surendra Nath, 68, Indian police officer and politician, Governor of Punjab (since 1991) and Governor of Himachal Pradesh (since 1993), plane crash.
- Bill Ryan, 82, Australian rugby league footballer.
- W. L. Warren, 64, British historian and medievalist.

=== 10 ===
- Bert Carey, 89, Australian rules footballer.
- Lélia Gonzalez, 59, Brazilian politician, anthropologist and human rights activist.
- André Joseph Guillaume Henri Kostermans, 88, Indonesian botanist.
- Robert Mellin, 91, Ukrainian-American composer, lyricist and music publisher.
- Zbigniew Piórkowski, 65, Polish Olympic boxer (1956).
- Earl Strom, 66, American National Basketball Association referee, brain cancer.

=== 11 ===
- Jack Dennington, 86, Australian rules footballer.
- Lex Humphries, 57, American jazz drummer.
- Gary Kildall, 52, American computer scientist and microcomputer entrepreneur, injury.
- Rama Raghoba Rane, 76, Indian Army officer.
- Savannah, 23, American pornographic film actress, suicide.
- Frieda Tiltsch, 72, Austrian Olympic discus thrower (1948, 1952).

=== 12 ===
- Abdul Jamil Abdul Rais, 82, Malaysian civil servant.
- James H. Aitchison, 85-86, Canadian academic and politician.
- Elder Paisios of Mount Athos, 69, Greek Eastern Orthodox monk, cancer.
- Yevhen Cherepovsky, 59, Soviet Ukrainian Olympic fencer (1956, 1960).
- James Joll, 76, British historian.
- Irena Krzywicka, 95, Polish feminist, writer, and women's rights activist .
- David Malcolm Lewis, 66, English historian.
- Wal-Berg, 83, French composer and conductor.

=== 13 ===
- Eddie Boyd, 79, American blues pianist, singer and songwriter.
- Anita Bärwirth, 75, German Olympic gymnast (1936).
- Gerry Couture, 68, Canadian ice hockey player (Detroit Red Wings, Montreal Canadiens, Chicago Black Hawks).
- John Kramer, 59, Danish football player.
- Juozas Miltinis, 86, Lithuanian actor and theatre director.
- Jimmie Reese, 92, American Major League Baseball player (New York Yankees, St. Louis Cardinals).
- Murray Tyrrell, 80, Australian public servant.
- Marik Vos-Lundh, 71, Swedish costume designer.
- Olin Chaddock Wilson, 85, American astronomer.

=== 14 ===
- Martin Crue, 74, American baseball player.
- Robert Jungk, 81, Austrian writer, journalist, historian and pacifist.
- Eric Linden, 84, American actor (Big City Blues, The Crowd Roars, Gone with the Wind).
- Alberto Lionello, 64, Italian film actor (The Birds, the Bees and the Italians, Pigsty), singer and presenter (Canzonissima), cancer.
- Américo Montanarini, 76, Brazilian Olympic basketball player (1936).
- Earl Murray, 67, American football player (Baltimore Colts, New York Giants, Pittsburgh Steelers).
- Jeanne Bieruma Oosting, 96, Dutch engraver, visual artist, and book designer.
- César Tovar, 54, Venezuelan baseball player, pancreatic cancer.

=== 15 ===
- Patricio Carvajal, 77, Chilean admiral and member of the military dictatorship, suicide.
- Harald Molander, 84, Swedish film producer.
- Edward Mulcock, 85, New Zealand cricketer.
- Mona Rico, 87, Mexican-American actress.
- William Walters, 86, South African athlete and Olympian (1932).

=== 16 ===
- Madzy Rollin Couquerque, 91, Dutch hockey- and tennis player.
- Robert Médus, 65, French rugby union and rugby league football player.
- William Revelli, 92, American conductor.
- Julian Schwinger, 76, American theoretical physicist and Nobel Prize laureate, pancreatic cancer.

=== 17 ===
- Sutan Takdir Alisjahbana, 86, Indonesian novelist and poet.
- Krešimir Arapović, 69, Croatian football player and manager.
- André Blusset, 90, French Olympic cross-country skier (1924).
- Jean Borotra, 95, French tennis champion and Olympian (1924).
- Sergey Chumakov, 66, Soviet Russian Olympic canoeist (1952).
- Horrie Gorringe, 99, Australian rules football player.
- Harry Harris, 74, British-American biochemist and geneticist.
- Billy Hillenbrand, 72, American gridiron football player (Chicago Rockets, Baltimore Colts).
- Henry Maier, 76, American politician, pneumonia.
- Jerry Mays, 54, American gridiron football player (Dallas Texans/Kansas City Chiefs), melanoma.
- António Rodrigues, 88, Portuguese Olympic sprinter (1932).
- Enrique San Pedro, 66, Cuban-American Roman Catholic bishop and missionary.
- Gozo Shioda, 78, Japanese master of aikido.

=== 18 ===
- Predrag Golubović, 59, Serbian film director and screenwriter.
- Merle Hapes, 75, American gridiron football player (New York Giants).
- Karl-Heinz Kunkel, 67, German footballer.
- Molly McGee, 41, American football player (Atlanta Falcons).
- Leonas Petrauskas, 75, Lithuanian basketball player.
- Jens Scheer, 59, German physicist and anti-nuclear activist.
- Michele Zaza, 49, Italian member of the Camorra criminal organisation, heart attack.

=== 19 ===
- Idona Crigler, 72, American baseball player.
- Eilís Dillon, 74, Irish author.
- Rudolf Firkušný, 82, Moravian-American classical pianist.
- Ray Flaherty, 90, American NBA football player (New York Giants) and coach (Boston/Washington Redskins).
- Ernst Müller-Hermann, 78, German politician.
- Andy Penman, 51, Scottish football player.
- Anatoly Raznochintsev, 66, Soviet Russian Olympic swimmer (1952).
- Gottfried Reinhardt, 81, Austrian-American film director and producer, pancreatic cancer.
- W. L. Warren, 64, British historian and medievalist .
- Han Xu, 70, Chinese diplomat.

=== 20 ===
- Paul Delvaux, 96, Belgian painter.
- Patrick J. Hillings, 71, American politician, member of the United States House of Representatives (1951-1959).
- Suzanne Juyol, 74, French opera soprano.
- Laila Shahzada, 68, Pakistani abstract painter, killed in gas explosion.
- Choi Yung-keun, 71, South Korean football player.

=== 21 ===
- Pere Calders, 80, Spanish writer and cartoonist.
- Dorothy Collins, 67, Canadian-American singer, actress, and recording artist, asthma.
- John Ernest, 72, American abstract artist.
- Clarissa Kaye, 63, Australian actress, cancer.
- Charles Lynch, 74, Canadian journalist and author.
- Marijac, 85, French comics writer, artist, and editor.
- Henri Mouillefarine, 83, French Olympic cyclist (1932).
- George Munger, 85, American college athlete, coach, and athletic director (Penn Quakers).
- Václav Pantůček, 59, Czech Olympic ice hockey player (1956, 1960).
- Hugh Scott, 93, American lawyer and politician, heart attack.

=== 22 ===
- Colin Cole, 78, English cricket player.
- Jack Harrold, 74, American opera singer.
- Jim Healy, 70, American sports commentator, complications of liver cancer.
- Alexandre Hogue, 96, American artist.
- Kho Ping Hoo, 67/68, Indonesian writer.

=== 23 ===
- Jorge André, 75, Costa Rican Olympic sports shooter (1968).
- Eva Bacon, 85, Austrian-Australian activist and feminist.
- Mario Brega, 71, Italian actor, heart attack.
- Umberto Cerati, 83, Italian long-distance runner and Olympian (1936).
- Hans J. Salter, 98, Austrian-American film composer (A Fistful of Dollars, For a Few Dollars More, The Good, the Bad and the Ugly).
- Lennox Sebe, 67, President of Ciskei.
- John Marlow Thompson, 79, British RAF officer and flying ace during World War II.
- Leroy Williams, 67, American baseball player.

=== 24 ===
- Clarence Behling, 78, Canadian ice hockey player (Detroit Red Wings).
- Leo Brongersma, 87, Dutch zoologist, herpetologist, and author.
- Helen Cordero, 79, American Cochiti Pueblo potter.
- Utaro Hashimoto, 87, Japanese 9-dan Go player.
- Tom Murphy, 93, American football player.
- Robert Wangila, 26, Kenyan boxer and Olympic champion (1988), injuries sustained during boxing match.

=== 25 ===
- Walter Baxter, 79, English novelist.
- Gerald Eades Bentley, 92, American academic and literary scholar.
- Jack Clemo, 78, British poet and writer.
- David Regan, 55, British academic, suicide.
- William E. Schevill, 88, American paleontologist.

=== 26 ===
- James Luther Adams, 92, American theologian.
- Roland Gladu, 83, Canadian baseball third baseman (Boston Braves).
- Christy Henrich, 22, American artistic gymnast, anorexia nervosa.
- Herm Holshouser, 87, American baseball player (St. Louis Browns).
- W. Dorr Legg, 89, American landscape architect gay rights activist.
- Tonia Marketaki, 51, Greek film director and screenwriter.
- Ernst Schröder, 79, German actor, suicide.
- Terry Scott, 67, English actor and comedian, cancer.
- Junnosuke Yoshiyuki, 70, Japanese novelist and short-story writer, liver cancer.

=== 27 ===
- Kevin Carter, 33, South African photojournalist and Pulitzer Prize winner, suicide.
- Rosa Chacel, 96, Spanish writer.
- Irving Folwartshny, 80, American hammer thrower and weight thrower.
- Eduard Kolmanovsky, 71, Soviet/Russian composer.
- Howie Livingston, 72, American gridiron football player.
- Paul Roebling, 60, American actor.
- Tai Solarin, 71, Nigerian educator and author.

=== 28 ===
- Lajos Bencze, 75, Hungarian Olympic wrestler (1948, 1952).
- Bernard Delfont, 84, Russian-British theatrical impresario.
- Arthur Holt, 83, British cricket player.
- Alfred Phillips, 86, Canadian diver and Olympian (1928, 1932).
- Erwin Ringel, 73, Austrian psychiatrist and neurologist.
- Colin Turnbull, 69, British-American anthropologist, AIDS-related complications.
- Munawwaruz Zaman, 44, Pakistani field hockey player and Olympian (1972, 1976), heart attack.

=== 29 ===
- Grigol Abashidze, 79, Georgian poet.
- John Britton, 69, American physician, homicide.
- Dorothy Hodgkin, 84, British chemist and Nobel Prize laureate, cerebral haemorrhage.
- Alessandro Manzo, 80, Italian sculptor.
- Leo McPartland, 74, Australian rules footballer.
- Mussum, 53, Brazilian actor and musician, cardiovascular disease.
- Paul Francis Tanner, 89, American Roman Catholic bishop.

=== 30 ===
- Ipče Ahmedovski, 28, Serbian and Macedonian folk singer, road accident.
- John Barnabas, 64, Indian evolutionary biologist.
- Janis Carter, 80, American actress, heart attack.
- Lionel Deraniyagala, 53, Sri Lankan actor.
- Tommy Joe Eagles, 45, American college basketball coach (Louisiana Tech Bulldogs, Auburn Tigers), heart attack.
- Konstantin Kalser, 73, German-American film producer and advertising executive.
- Derek Raymond, 63, English crime writer.
- Ryszard Riedel, 37, Polish singer and songwriter.
- Helmut Schäfer, 85, German Olympic weightlifter (1932).
- Theo van Scheltinga, 80, Dutch chess player.

=== 31 ===
- Joe Bratty, 33, Northern Irish loyalist paramilitary, shot by the IRA.
- Raymond Elder, 32, Northern Irish loyalist paramilitary, shot by the IRA.
- Carlos A. Santos-Viola, 82, Filipino architect .
- Anne Shelton, 70, English vocalist, heart attack.
- Reginald Sutton, 85, English swimmer, water polo player, and Olympian (1928, 1932, 1936).
- Caitlin Thomas, 80, English author and the wife of writer Dylan Thomas.
- Hy Vandenberg, 88, American baseball player (Boston Red Sox, New York Giants, Chicago Cubs).

== Sources ==
- Liebman, Roy (2000). The Wampas Baby Stars: A Biographical Dictionary, 1922–1934. Jefferson, North Carolina: McFarland. ISBN 0-7864-0756-5.
