= Athletics at the 1932 Summer Olympics – Men's 200 metres =

Men's 200 metres at the Games of the X Olympiad
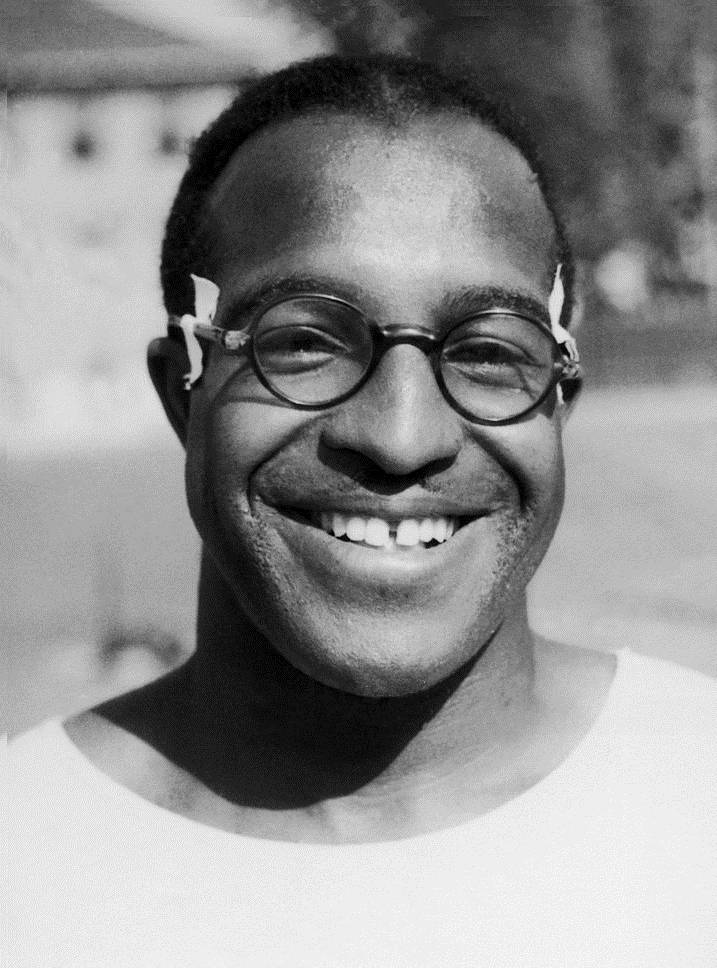
- Eddie Tolan
- Venue: Los Angeles Memorial Coliseum
- Dates: August 2, 1932 (heats and quarterfinals); August 3, 1932 (semifinals and final)
- Competitors: 25 from 13 nations
- Winning time: 21.2 OR

Medalists
1st place, gold medalist(s)		Eddie Tolan; United States
2nd place, silver medalist(s)		George Simpson; United States
3rd place, bronze medalist(s)		Ralph Metcalfe; United States

The men's 200 metres sprint event at the 1932 Summer Olympics took place on August 2 and August 3 at the Los Angeles Memorial Coliseum. There were 25 athletes from 13 nations. The 1930 Olympic Congress in Berlin had reduced the limit from 4 athletes per NOC to 3 athletes. After missing the podium entirely in 1928, the United States swept the medals in the event in 1932. It was the second medal sweep in the event by the United States (after 1904), as well as the nation's sixth victory in eight Games. Eddie Tolan won gold by 0.2 seconds, with George Simpson winning silver and Ralph Metcalfe winning bronze.

Afterwards, the film of the race revealed that Metcalfe had run 201.5 meters due to a measurement error: despite being offered a re-run by race officials, Metcalfe graciously declined.

== Background ==
This was the eighth appearance of the event, which was not held at the first Olympics in 1896 but has been on the program ever since. None of the six finalists from the 1928 Games returned. The Americans were favored coming into the Games, particularly Eddie Tolan and Ralph Metcalfe. Tolan had won the 100 metres over Metcalfe two days before the final of the 200 metres.

The Republic of China made its debut in the event. The United States made its eighth appearance, the only nation to have competed at each edition of the 200 metres to date.

== Competition format ==
The competition used the four round format introduced in 1920: heats, quarterfinals, semifinals, and a final. There were 7 heats of between 2 and 5 runners each, with the top 3 men in each advancing to the quarterfinals. The quarterfinals consisted of 4 heats of 5 athletes each; the 3 fastest men in each heat advanced to the semifinals. There were 2 semifinals, each with 6 runners. Again, the top 3 athletes advanced. The final had 6 runners. The races were run on a now-standard 400 metre track.

== Records ==
Prior to this competition, the existing world and Olympic records were as follows:

World record		20.6^{*}		
Olympic record	Archie Hahn (USA)	21.6	St. Louis, United States	31 August 1904

^{*}On a straightaway; no world record existed for running on a curve at the time.

Ralph Metcalfe set a new Olympic record in the first quarterfinal with a time of 21.5 seconds. Eddie Tolan matched the new record in the second quarterfinal. Carlos Bianchi broke it in the third, with 21.4 seconds; Arthur Jonath matched Bianchi's time in the fourth quarterfinal. That record survived the semifinals, but Tolan bettered it with 21.2 seconds in the final.

== Schedule ==
Date	Time	Round
Tuesday, 2 August 1932	15:00; 17:30	Heats; Quarterfinals
Wednesday, 3 August 1932	14:30; 17:00	Semifinals; Final

== Results ==
=== Heats ===
Seven heats were held; the fastest three runners advanced to the quarterfinal round.

==== Heat 1 ====
Rank	Athlete	Nation	Time	Notes
1	Erich Borchmeyer	Germany	22.1	Q
2	Takayoshi Yoshioka	Japan	22.3	Q
3	Stanley Engelhart	Great Britain		Q

==== Heat 2 ====
Rank	Athlete	Nation	Time	Notes
1	Willie Walters	South Africa	21.9	Q
2	Eddie Tolan	United States	22.0	Q
3	Stanley Fuller	Great Britain	22.4	Q
4	Enrique Sánchez	Mexico	22.8	

==== Heat 3 ====
Rank	Athlete	Nation	Time	Notes
1	Harold Wright	Canada	22.8	Q
2	Ralph Metcalfe	United States	22.9	Q
3	Stuart Black	New Zealand	23.1	Q
4	Liu Changchun	(Taiwan) China	23.4	

==== Heat 4 ====
Rank	Athlete	Nation	Time	Notes
1	Itaro Nakajima	Japan	22.2	Q
2	Fritz Hendrix	Germany	22.9	Q

==== Heat 5 ====
Rank	Athlete	Nation	Time	Notes
1	Roberto Genta	Argentina	25.3	Q
2	Chris Berger	Netherlands	26.1	Q
3	George Simpson	United States	29.0	Q

==== Heat 6 ====
Rank	Athlete	Nation	Time	Notes
1	Arthur Jonath	Germany	21.9	Q
2	Allan Elliot	New Zealand	22.2	Q
3	Carlos Bianchi	Argentina	22.3	Q
4	Andrej Engel	Czechoslovakia	22.3	
5	Everardo Múzquiz	Mexico	23.0	

==== Heat 7 ====
Rank	Athlete	Nation	Time	Notes
1	Bert Pearson	Canada	22.3	Q
2	Danie Joubert	South Africa	22.3	Q
3	Teiichi Nishi	Japan	22.4	Q
4	Ronald Vernieux	India	22.8	

=== Quarterfinals ===
Four heats were held; the three fastest runners in each heat advanced to the semifinal round.

==== Quarterfinal 1 ====
Rank	Athlete	Nation	Time	Notes
1	Ralph Metcalfe	United States	21.5	Q, OR
2	Willie Walters	South Africa	21.5	Q
3	Erich Borchmeyer	Germany	21.6	Q
4	Itaro Nakajima	Japan	21.9	
5	Chris Berger	Netherlands	22.0	

==== Quarterfinal 2 ====
Rank	Athlete	Nation	Time	Notes
1	Eddie Tolan	United States	21.5	Q, =OR
2	Bert Pearson	Canada	21.7	Q
3	Roberto Genta	Argentina	21.8	Q
4	Fritz Hendrix	Germany	21.9	
5	Stanley Fuller	Great Britain	22.0	

==== Quarterfinal 3 ====
Rank	Athlete	Nation	Time	Notes
1	Carlos Bianchi	Argentina	21.4	Q, OR
2	George Simpson	United States	21.5	Q
3	Danie Joubert	South Africa	21.7	Q
4	Takayoshi Yoshioka	Japan	21.8	
5	Stuart Black	New Zealand	22.0	

==== Quarterfinal 4 ====
Rank	Athlete	Nation	Time	Notes
1	Arthur Jonath	Germany	21.4	Q, =OR
2	Harold Wright	Canada	21.7	Q
3	Allan Elliot	New Zealand	21.8	Q
4	Stanley Engelhart	Great Britain	21.9	
5	Teiichi Nishi	Japan	22.1	

=== Semifinals ===
Two heats were held; the fastest three runners advanced to the final round.

==== Semifinal 1 ====
Rank	Athlete	Nation	Time	Notes
1	Ralph Metcalfe	United States	21.5	Q
2	George Simpson	United States	21.5	Q
3	Carlos Bianchi	Argentina	21.6	Q
4	Danie Joubert	South Africa	21.7	
5	Erich Borchmeyer	Germany	21.8	
6	Bert Pearson	Canada	21.9	

==== Semifinal 2 ====
Rank	Athlete	Nation	Time	Notes
1	Arthur Jonath	Germany	21.5	Q
2	Willie Walters	South Africa	21.7	Q
3	Eddie Tolan	United States	21.7	Q
4	Harold Wright	Canada	21.8	
5	Allan Elliot	New Zealand	21.9	
6	Roberto Genta	Argentina	22.0	

=== Final ===
Rank	Athlete	Nation	Time	Notes
1st place, gold medalist(s)	Eddie Tolan	United States	21.2	OR
2nd place, silver medalist(s)	George Simpson	United States	21.4	
3rd place, bronze medalist(s)	Ralph Metcalfe	United States	21.5	
4	Arthur Jonath	Germany	21.5	
5	Carlos Bianchi	Argentina	21.6	
6	Willie Walters	South Africa	21.9	
