= Eddie Tolan =

US Olympic sprinter

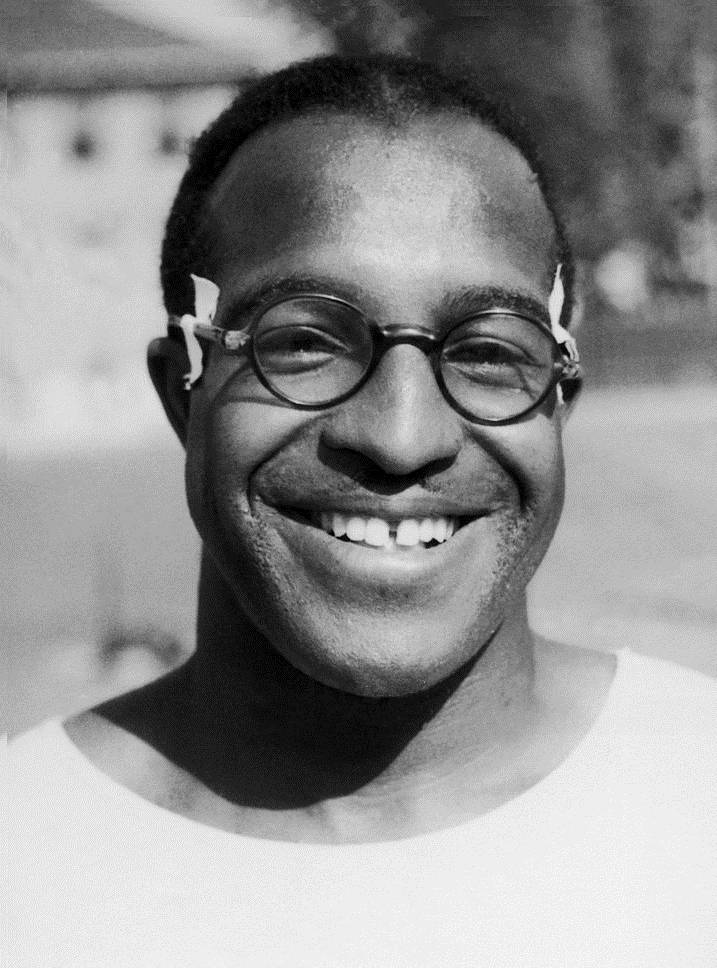
- Tolan in 1932

Personal information
- Born: September 29, 1908 Denver, Colorado, U.S.
- Died: January 30, 1967 (aged 58) Detroit, Michigan, U.S.
- Height: 5 ft 7 in (1.70 m)
- Weight: 143 lb (65 kg)

Sport
- Sport: Athletics
- Events: 100 m, 200 m

Achievements and titles
- Personal bests: 100 m – 10.38 (1932); 200 m – 20.9y (1931)
Medal record
Representing the United States
Olympic Games
Gold medal – first place	1932 Los Angeles	100 meters
Gold medal – first place	1932 Los Angeles	200 meters

Thomas Edward Tolan (September 29, 1908 – January 30, 1967), nicknamed the "Midnight Express", was an American track and field athlete who competed in sprints. He set world records in the 100-yard dash and 100 meters event and Olympic records in the 100 meters and 200 meters events. He was the first non-Euro-American to receive the title of the "world's fastest human" after winning gold medals in the 100 and 200 meters events at the 1932 Summer Olympics in Los Angeles. In March 1935, Tolan won the 75, 100 and 220-yard events at the World Professional Sprint Championships in Melbourne to become the first man to win both the amateur and professional world sprint championships. In his full career as a sprinter, Tolan won 300 races and lost only 7.

== Early years ==
Tolan was born in Denver, Colorado, one of four children. Tolan's father was Thomas Tolan. The family moved to Salt Lake City, Utah, when Tolan was young, and moved again to Detroit, Michigan, in 1924, when Tolan was 15 years old. Tolan later recalled, "My father read about better opportunities for Negroes here, so he packed up Mom and the four kids and we came here."

== Cass Tech High School ==
Tolan attended Cass Technical High School in Detroit where he was an outstanding football player and sprinter. While at Cass Tech, Tolan set state records in the 100- and 220-yard dashes. While still in high school, Tolan ran the 100-yard dash in 9.8 seconds and the 220-yard dash in 21.5 seconds. Aged 16, Tolan was a member of a two-man team from Cass Tech that won the 1925 National Interscholastic indoor meet in Chicago. He won his first sprint double at the state meet as a sophomore, and in 1927 he won the 100- and 220-yard dashes at the National Interscholastic Championship at Soldier Field in Chicago. Despite his accomplishments as a sprinter, Tolan's first love was football, and he often said "the six touchdowns he scored in one game as a 131-pound quarterback at Detroit's Cass Tech High School was his greatest thrill, rather than his double win in the Olympics."

== University of Michigan ==
=== Football ===
Tolan was recruited by several major universities as a football player and chose the University of Michigan. There are differing accounts as to why Tolan never played on the varsity football team at Michigan. According to a published account in The Detroit News in 2002, Tolan joined the freshman football team as a freshman in 1927. At that time, no African-American had played on Michigan's varsity football team since George Jewett in the 1890s. Tolan was initially allowed to play, but on the third day of practice, the freshman football coach told him, "Some of the coaches are disagreeing on your chances. Some of them think that you shouldn't be allowed to play football. I'd be tickled to have you, but I'm afraid I'm going to be outvoted." The Detroit News noted that the freshman coach was outvoted: "They took away Eddie Tolan's football uniform and handed him a track suit in exchange."

Other accounts indicate it was an injury that prevented Tolan from playing football at Michigan. An Associated Press story on Tolan in 1958 stated: "He would have been a football great as a quarterback, had a knee injury in his junior year in high school not forced him to channel all his energies to track." In his obituary, the Associated Press reported that the coaches at Michigan "talked the pint-sized speedster into going out for track." Tolan was also quoted as saying, "The track team did a lot more traveling then, so I saw the opportunity to travel on a Pullman and see the country."

=== Big Ten and world sprint champion ===
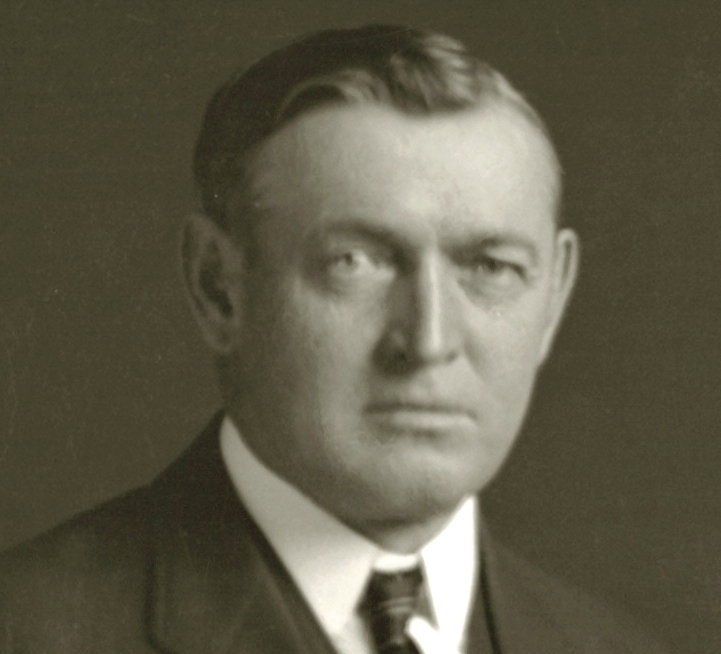
Tolan's coach, Steve Farrell, was considered "the greatest professional footracer this country has ever known"

At Michigan, Tolan ran track under the mentorship of two of the great sprinters of their generations. Michigan's head coach, Steve Farrell, was considered "the greatest professional footracer this country has ever known" in the 1880s and 1890s. And Michigan's assistant coach Charles B. Hoyt, who took over from Farrell in 1930, was rated "America's best sprinter" in 1913, but lost his opportunity to compete in the 1916 Olympics due to World War I. Coaches at Michigan weren't supportive in the face of racism Tolan faced while traveling, and even told him he'd be the last black athlete on the team if he complained.

As a sophomore in May 1929, Tolan broke the Big Ten Conference record and tied the world's record for the 100-yard dash with a time of 9.6. Press coverage starting with this world record run, and throughout his career, focused on three features – Tolan's race, his eyeglasses, and his short stocky build. Tolan was one of the first African-Americans to have success in sprinting, and he raced with eyeglasses taped to his head. Various accounts put his height anywhere from 5 feet, 4 inches, to 5 feet, 7 inches. One writer noted that Tolan "looks like a church deacon." Another writer described Tolan's appearance this way:

Tolan, known as the 'Midnight Express,' was five feet six inches (1.68 m) tall and weighed 130 pounds (59 kg). He smiled often, raced while chewing gum, and could be easily identified by a bandage around his left knee to protect an old football injury. In addition he wore horn-rimmed glasses held in place with adhesive tape.

Tolan's gum-chewing became part of his routine. He chewed gum before a race to relieve stress. After accidentally running with the gum in his mouth, Tolan found that he was chewing in sync with his stride. Tolan later began chewing gum as part of his routine, chewing the gum faster when he needed to accelerate his leg movements.

At the Big Ten championships in May 1930, Tolan broke the world's record in the 100-yard dash with a time of 9.5. Tolan's performance was accepted by the International Amateur Athletic Federation as the new official world's record.

Seven weeks after breaking the world's record in the 100-yard dash, Tolan also broke the world's record in the 100 meters race. Competing in Vancouver, British Columbia, Tolan shaved two-tenths of a second off the record with a time of 10-1/5 seconds. Track officials in Vancouver announced after the race, that Tolan's record-setting performance was "all the more remarkable in the fact that he ran uphill, the finish mark being thirty inches higher than the starting point."

Tolan's world-record performances in 1930 brought him international fame, as he became known as the "Midnight Express." In May 1931, Tolan again broke the world's record in the 100 meters event with a time of 10.3 seconds in Vancouver. Southern California sprinter Frank Wykoff jumped to a slight lead, but Tolan came from behind to pass Wykoff at the 100-yard mark.

Tolan graduated from the University of Michigan in 1931.

== Double gold medals at the 1932 Summer Olympics ==
=== Lead-up to the Olympics ===
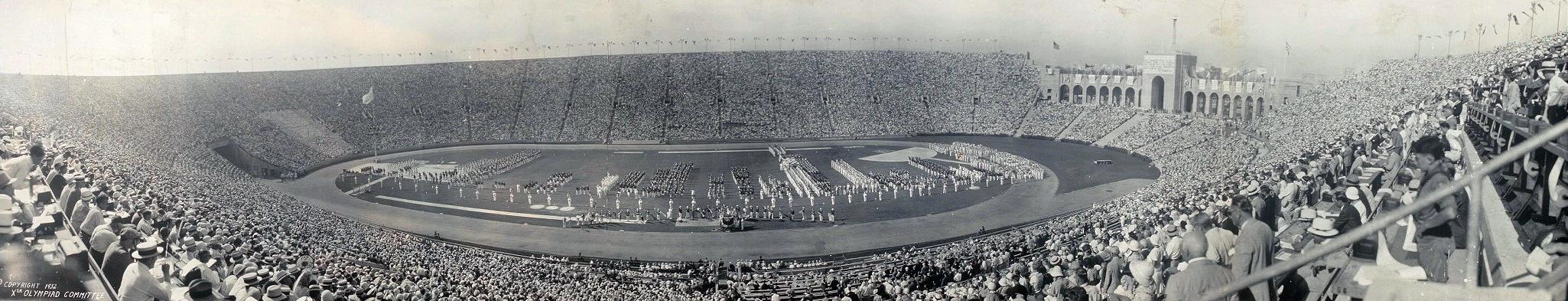
The Los Angeles Memorial Coliseum on the opening day of the 1932 Olympics

After graduating from Michigan, Tolan enrolled at West Virginia State College, where he did "graduate work preparatory to teaching and coaching at a Negro institution." Early in 1932, Tolan was not running at his prior level. Despite the slow start, Dean Cromwell, Chairman of the All American Board of Track and Field, predicted great things for Tolan in his column on 1932's "Olympic Prospects." Cromwell wrote of Tolan:

Just as spring warms into summer Tolan slides from the class of mediocre sprinters to that of the champions. He is a slow starter, but when the weather gets warm so does Eddie, and off he goes.

While press reports regularly referred to Tolan as "stocky," Cromwell took issue with that characterization:

Eddie is now 24 years of age, five feet six inches tall and weights about 130 pounds. Although he has always been termed 'stocky' by the press, a comparison of his weight and height will show that he cannot properly be so styled. He is well muscled, though, and in action gives the impression of great running power, with his arms and legs working smoothly and strongly in a machine piston-like manner.

The Olympic trials were held at Stanford University, and Ralph Metcalfe won both the 100 and 200 meters finals, with Tolan finishing second to Metcalfe in each case. The results meant that the top two American sprinters in the 1932 Olympics would for the first time be African-Americans. As a result, much of the press attention focused on race. Los Angeles Times sports columnist Braven Dyer wrote: "Metcalfe and Tolan make the ace of spades look positively pale by comparison … But how these boys can run … And they figure to do even better here than they did at Palo Alto because it's warmer now and they enjoy the heat."

=== 100 meters race ===
The 100 meters contest at the 1932 Olympics was one of the closest races in Olympic history. Tolan broke the Olympic record in the first heat of the second round with a time of 10.4 seconds, but Metcalfe remained the favorite. In the finals, Japanese sprinter Takayoshi Yoshioka jumped out to a four-yard lead after 40 meters. Tolan passed Yoshioka at the 60 meter mark and had a two-yard lead over Metcalfe at the 100-yard mark. But Metcalfe passed Tolan at the tape and appeared to the crowd to be the winner. Sports writer Maxwell Stiles described the last strides as follows:

His powerful legs churning wildly, Metcalfe swept down upon little Tolan like an avenging angel full of fury. Tolan, his left knee in an elastic bandage and his glasses taped to his head near his ears, dug in for one last desperate stride in his effort to hold the lead. Just at the tape, Metcalfe rushed past Tolan and was well ahead a yard beyond the finish. Almost everyone thought Metcalfe had won.

It was hours later, after review of films taken with a "Kirby two-eyed camera," that officials were able to declare Tolan the winner with a time of 10.3 seconds. The films showed that Tolan and Metcalfe hit the finish line in a dead heat, but Tolan was declared the winner, because he had his entire torso past the line on the ground before Metcalfe.

=== 200 meters race ===
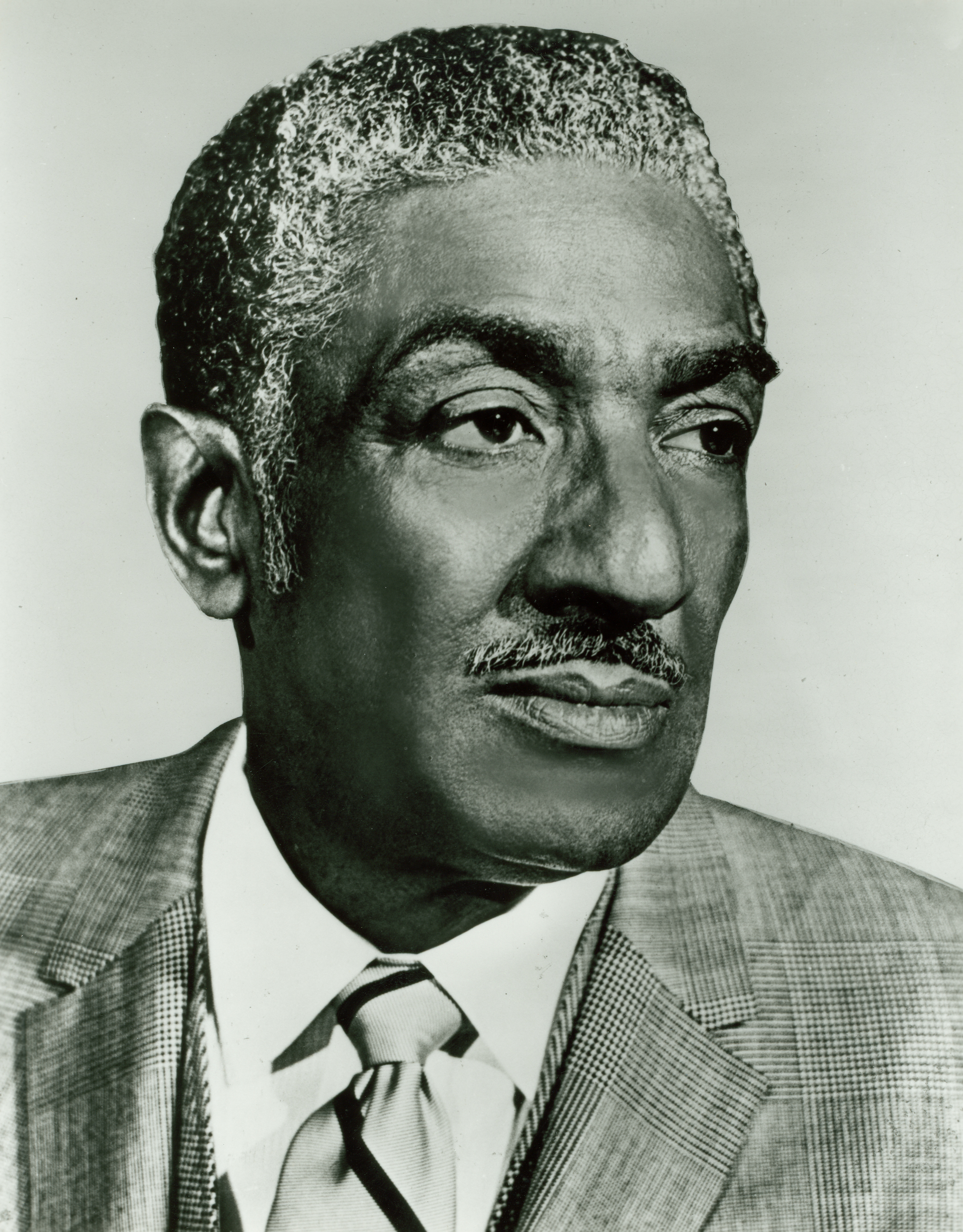
Tolan's rival and roommate at the 1932 Olympics, Ralph Metcalfe, later became a U.S. Congressman.

The 200 meters race was held on the fourth day of competition, and this time the race was not close, as Tolan beat Metcalfe easily with an Olympic record time of 21.2 seconds – four-tenths of a second better than the prior record of 21.6 seconds. Tolan stumbled slightly with three yards to go, but righted himself and finished with a four-foot lead. With double wins in the 100 and 200 meters contests, Tolan was dubbed the "world's fastest human." Tolan was the first African-American to have that distinction, and press coverage of his Olympic wins focused on his race. The Associated Press called him the "spectacled little American Negro" and "the dusky little thunderbolt." Braven Dyer referred to him as "the stubby colored boy," and noted that "the chunky Detroit Negro" had defeated Arthur Jonath of Germany, "the white-skinned Teuton." Another writer described how the "little black man with horn-rimmed glasses" crossed the finish line, being chased by "a white man of America, George Simpson," and "a brother black, Ralph Metcalfe."

Commentators also noted, that the only other two sprinters to win double gold in the 100 and 200 meters races were also University of Michigan athletes, Ralph Craig and Archie Hahn.

=== Reaction to Tolan's accomplishments ===
After the sprint competition concluded, a reporter interviewed Tolan and Metcalfe in their shared room at the Olympic Village. When Metcalfe teased Tolan for being lucky, Tolan replied, "Yeah, I had it all right – but it's 'bout time, Ralph; first little ol' luck I had in eight years!" Still in bed at noon wearing pajamas and with a stocking cap on his head, Tolan said he was "in the best condition of my life when the 200 meters final started," and he vowed to give his gold medals to his mother.

Back in Detroit, Mayor Frank Murphy appointed a reception committee to meet Tolan at the train station, and Michigan Governor Wilber M. Brucker declared September 6, 1932 as "Eddie Tolan Day" throughout the state. The governor issued a proclamation stating that Tolan had "brought honor to our commonwealth" and encouraging communities throughout the state to arrange ceremonies "as an expression of Michigan's pride in his achievement."

Tolan's mother noted, that she was proud of her son's accomplishments. She noted that, though she had worked hard as the sole provider for the family, it was worth it. She added, "If my menfolk could only find jobs I could ease up a bit and a mighty big worry would be off Eddie's mind."

In April 1936, Tolan, along with many other sports champions and stand outs, were honored at a banquet in Detroit, MI. This Banquet was the first celebration of Champions Day.

== Vaudeville and hard times ==
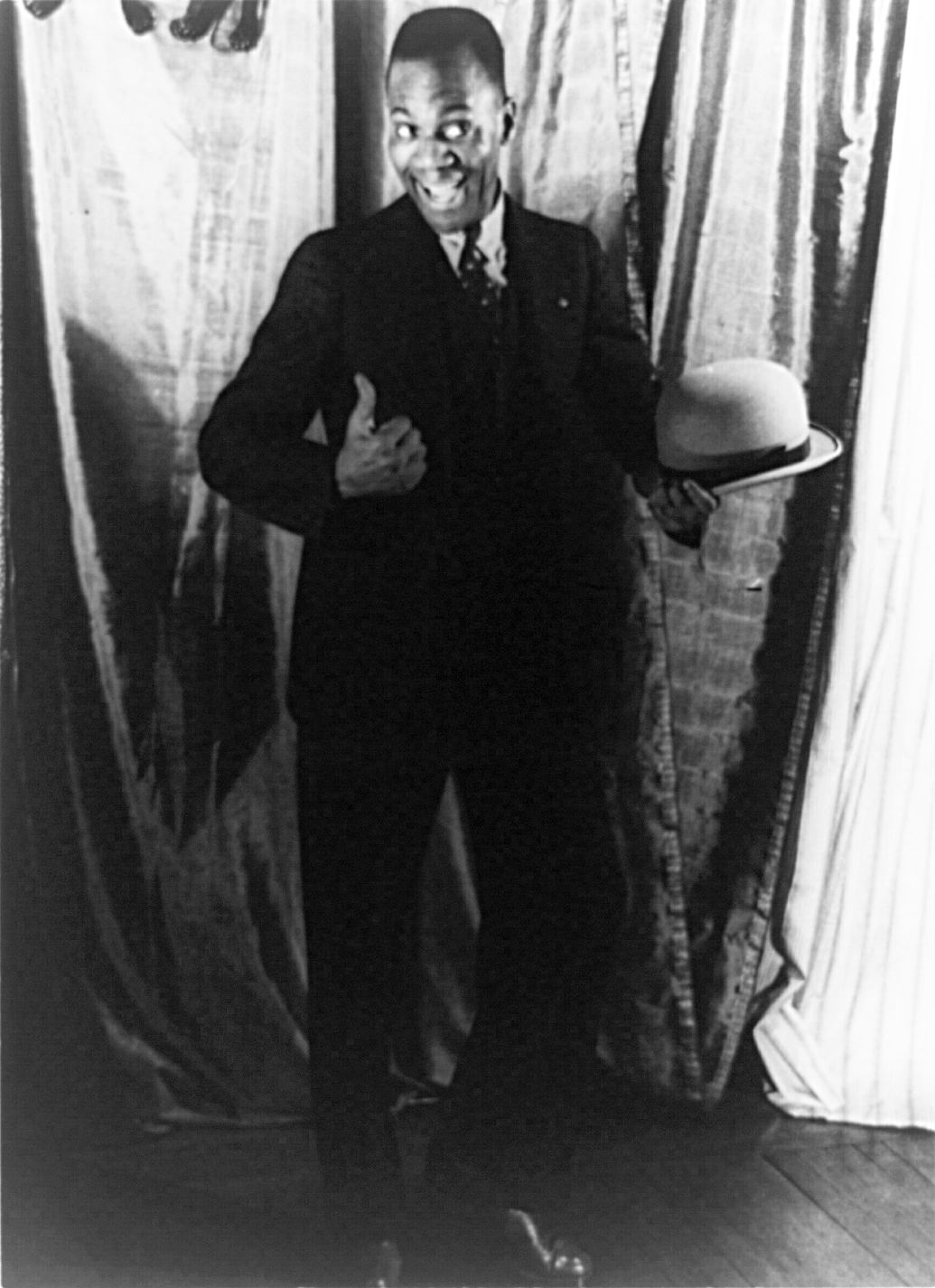
After the 1932 Olympics, Tolan appeared in vaudeville with Bill "Bojangles" Robinson.

Less than six months after winning Olympic gold medals and the title of the "world's fastest human," Tolan garnered national press when he fell on hard times. Syndicated columnist William H. Beatty wrote that "the heady wine of victory has turned overnight to vinegar" for Tolan. Tolan noted that, when he was met at the train station by a welcoming committee, his half-brother was collecting waste paper in the grass of the park in front of the train station. Tolan noted that his half-brother was "luckier than I am," because he had a job. His parents had both been unemployed for many months, and it was not until January 1933 that Tolan was able to get a low-paying job as a filing clerk in a county office. Tolan's lifetime dream of becoming a physician was waning, as he had been "unable to make enough to support himself and his parents."

Desperate to earn a living, Tolan "walked the streets of many cities, seeking work," and even briefly appeared in vaudeville in 1932 with Bill "Bojangles" Robinson. They made a good team; Tolan had set world records for running forwards, and Robinson had set world's records for running backwards: 50 yards backward sprint (6 seconds), 75 yards backwards sprint (8.2 seconds), and 100 yards backwards sprint (13.2 seconds).

Because of his brief appearance in vaudeville, the Michigan Amateur Athletic Association stripped Tolan of his amateur status in June 1933. And in April 1934, Tolan's bad luck continued as an automobile he was driving struck and seriously injured an 80-year-old pedestrian.

== Professional sprinting career ==
In November 1934, Tolan took a leave of absence from his job as assistant county registrar of deeds to compete in the Australian sprint program, a series of five professional races, including the Stawell Gift handicap. Tolan returned in April 1935 after having set new Australian records of 21.5 seconds in the 220-yard dash on a full curve track and 7.5 seconds for the 75-yard dash. He won the 75, 100, and 220-yard events at the World Professional Sprint Championships in March 1935 in Melbourne, defeating Austin Robertson Sr. and became the first man to win both the amateur and professional world sprint championships.

In January 1935, Tolan attempted to break the 90-yard world record time of 8 & 7/10th seconds in Wangaratta, Victoria, at the Wangaratta Athletic Carnival on the fast Wangaratta Showgrounds track. Tolan unfortunately pulled a leg muscle on the day in a prior running event and was then unable to attempt to break the record.

In his full career as a sprinter, Tolan won 300 races and lost only 7. Throughout his career as a sprinter, Tolan worked by a simple creed: "Start fast, run easily, stay in your lane and finish strong."

== Civil service and teaching career ==
After returning from Australia, Tolan returned to his job in Detroit as a clerk to the Register of Deeds. During World War II he worked as a material checker for Packard Motor Car Company and worked at a variety of jobs in the 1940s and 1950s. The 1950 census shows that he owned a gas station. In 1956, Tolan became a school teacher in physical and health education. He taught at the Irving Elementary School on Detroit's West Side for several years.

== Death and family ==
Tolan never married. He was, however, briefly engaged in 1938 to Johnnie Mae McConcico as was noted in the New Pittsburgh Courier on July 9, 1938.

In 1965, Tolan's kidneys failed, and he was required to undergo weekly dialysis treatments for the rest of his life. In 1967, Tolan died from heart failure at age 58 at Detroit's Mt. Carmel Hospital, while undergoing one of his weekly treatments. At the time of his death, Jesse Owens paid him tribute in Jet magazine:

When I was in high school, Eddie and Ralph (Metcalfe) were my idols. Eddie and I later became close friends. I used to live in Detroit and every time I'd go back Eddie was one of the first ones I'd look up.

Tolan was survived by his sisters, June Brown and Martha Lombard, and a brother, Hart H. Tolan. Though the two never met, Tolan was also a cousin of former Major League Baseball player Bobby Tolan. Eddie Tolan is interred at United Memorial Gardens in Plymouth, Michigan.

== Honors and awards ==
In 1958, Tolan was inducted into the Michigan Sports Hall of Fame. He was one of the first 18 persons inducted. He was inducted into the University of Michigan Athletic Hall of Honor in 1980. Only 17 individuals were inducted into the Hall before Tolan.

Tolan was one of many athletes honored in 1936 for Champions Day in Detroit, Michigan.

Tolan was a member of Alpha Phi Alpha fraternity.

Eddie Tolan was inducted into the National Track and Field Hall of Fame in 1982.

== See also ==
- University of Michigan Athletic Hall of Honor
