= Stuart Black (sprinter) =

New Zealand sprinter

Personal information
- Full name: Stuart Alexander Black
- Born: 8 February 1908 Stratford, New Zealand
- Died: 20 February 1989 (aged 81) New Plymouth, New Zealand

Sport
- Country: New Zealand
- Sport: Athletics

Achievements and titles
- National finals: 440 yards champion (1932, 1933)
- Personal best(s): 200 m – 22.0 s 440 yards – 48.8 s

Stuart Alexander Black (8 February 1908 – 20 February 1989) was a New Zealand sprinter who represented his country at the 1932 Olympic Games in Los Angeles.

== Biography ==
Born in Stratford in 1908, Black was the son of Maud Harriet (née Shalders) and Wilfred Alick Black, a solicitor.

At the 1932 national amateur athletics championships in Auckland, Black won the 440 yards title with a New Zealand record time of 48.8 s, and finished second behind Allan Elliot in the 220 yards. As a member of the New Zealand team at the 1932 Olympics, Black competed in both the 200 m and 400 m events. In the 200 m, he placed third in his heat and progressed to the quarter-final where he clocked a personal-best time of 22.0 s, which, however, was not good enough to progress further. In the 400 m, Black was eliminated in the first round, placing fourth in his heat in a time of 49.9 s.

The following year, Black successfully defended his national 440 yards title, defeating Geoff Broadway, in a time of 49.6 s, and placed third in the 220 yards.

Black died in New Plymouth in 1989.
