= Ricardo Guimarães =

Ricardo Guimarães may refer to:

- Ricardo Guimarães (athlete) (1909–1974), Brazilian sprinter
- Cadum (born 1959), Ricardo Cardoso Guimarães, Brazilian basketball player and coach
- Guima (footballer, born 1995), Ricardo Martins Guimarães, Portuguese footballer
