= Liu Changchun =

Chinese sprinter (1909–1983)

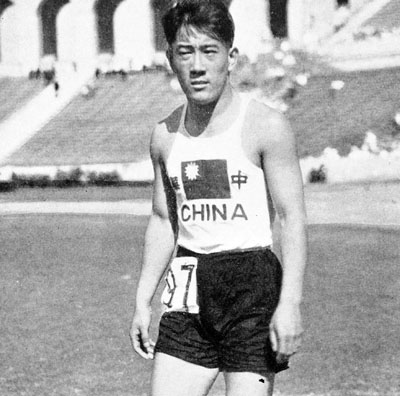
- Born: November 25, 1909; Ping Island, Jin County, Fengtian, Qing Empire
- Died: March 25, 1983 (aged 73); Dalian, Liaoning, People's Republic of China
- Occupations: Sprinter, athletics coach, teacher, sports administrator
- Known for: First Chinese athlete at the Olympic Games

Chinese name
- Traditional Chinese: 劉長春
- Simplified Chinese: 刘长春
Transcriptions
Standard Mandarin
- Hanyu Pinyin: Liú Chángchūn
- Wade–Giles: Liu Ch'ang-Ch'un

Liu Changchun (Chinese: 劉長春; listed in official Olympic records as "Liu, Chang-Chun"; November 25, 1909 – February 21, 1983) was a Chinese sprinter. Liu was the first athlete to represent China in competition at an Olympic Games. He was the sole competitor from the Republic of China at the 1932 Summer Olympics in Los Angeles; four years later he again represented the Republic of China at the 1936 Summer Olympics in Berlin. Later in life, he was also an athletics coach, a physical education teacher, and a sports administrator.

== 1932 Summer Olympics ==
Due to the Second Sino-Japanese War, the Kuomintang of the Republic of China decided to abstain from attending the 1932 Summer Olympics in Los Angeles. The Japanese puppet state of Manchukuo announced that two athletes, Liu Changchun and Yu Xiwei would represent Manchukuo at the 1932 Summer Olympics. In May 1932, Liu announced in the newspaper Ta Kung Pao his refusal to represent Manchukuo and his wish to represent China. As the Kuomintang refused to finance his journey, General Zhang Xueliang provided 8,000 silver dollars which made it possible for him to compete in the games.

On the July 31, 1932, Liu competed in the 100m preliminaries, where he was assigned to group 2 which had 5 athletes. Liu wrote about the race in his diary: "The winner ran faster than me about 4 yards at the end, his time was 10.9 sec. I was the fourth runner-up, the time was about 11 sec. In this competition, I got ahead before 60m, however, other competitors overtook me after 80m. I cannot get a better result due to exhaustion from a month-long journey to U.S., and lack of exercise during the journey." Liu registered for the Men's 100m, 200m, and 400m; where he failed to qualify for the Finals of the Men's 100m and 200m, and he did not compete in the Men's 400m due to exhaustion.

== Teaching and administrative career ==
Liu began his teaching career in the 1930s. He taught as an assistant instructor, lecturer, associate professor, and professor of physical education at Northeastern University, Beijing Normal University, Northeastern Chung-Cheng University, and Dalian University of Technology.

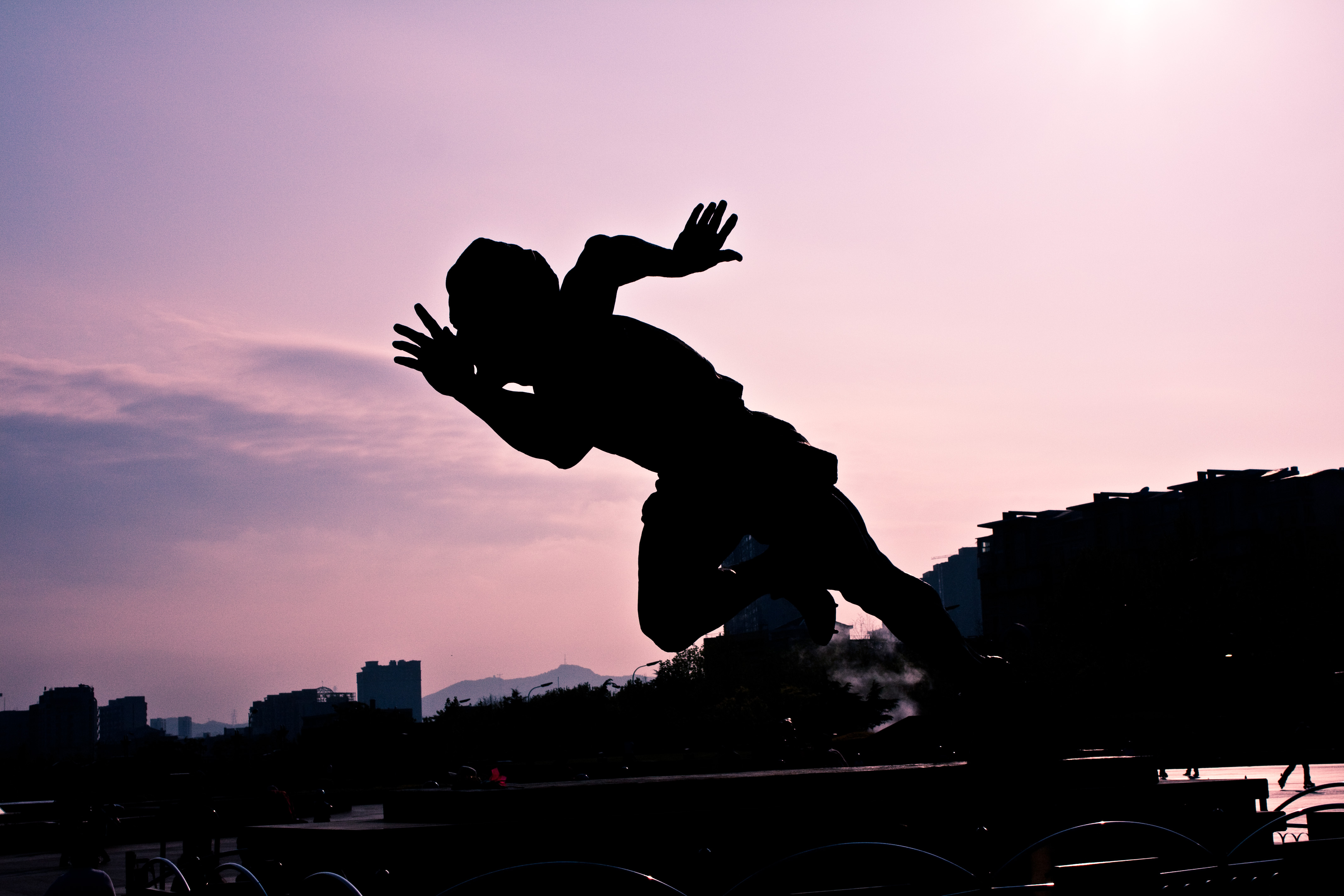
Liu Changchun's statue at the Olympic Square in Dalian

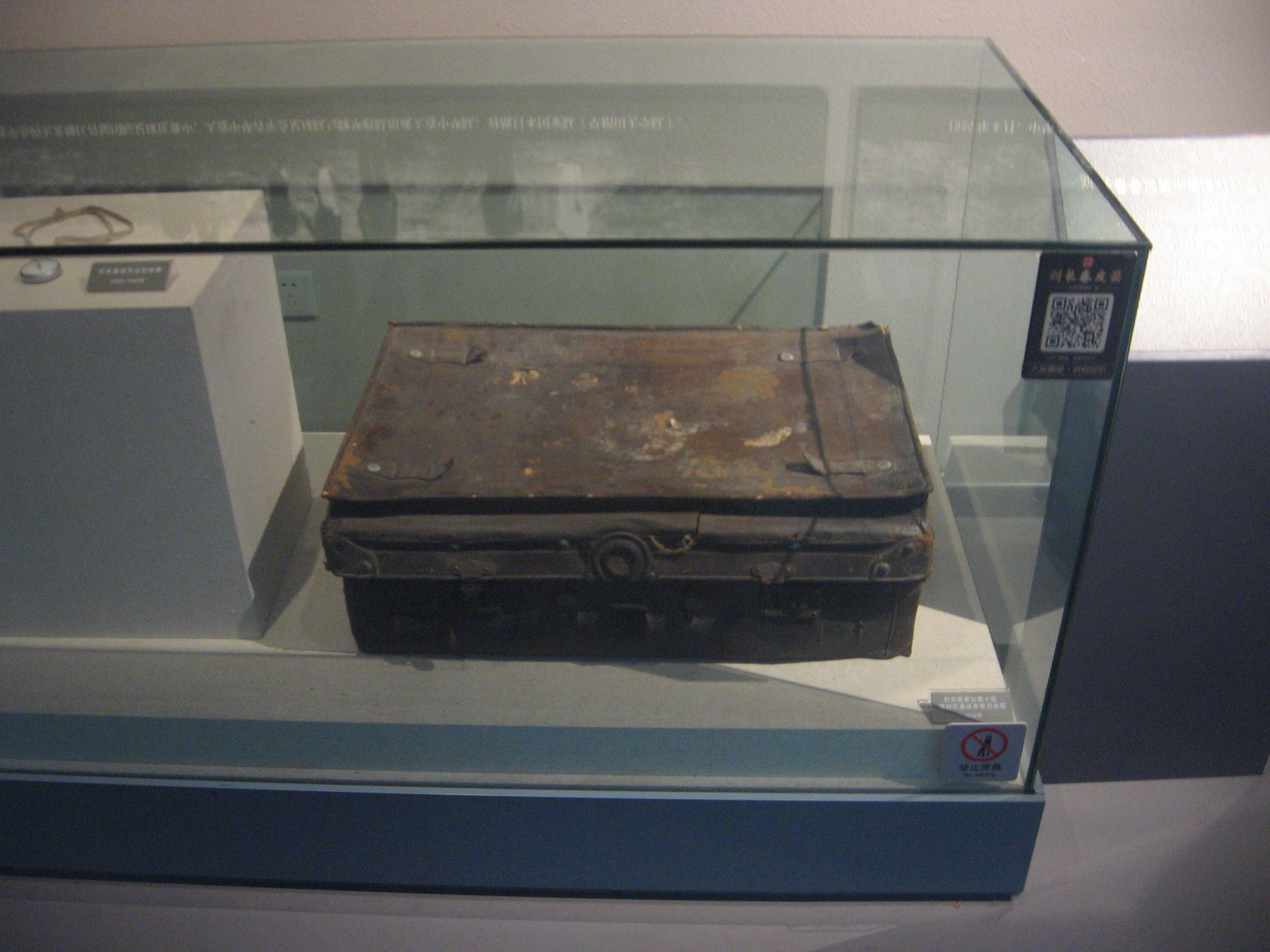
Liu Changchun's suitcase during the 1932 Summer Olympics in Los Angeles, displayed at Dalian Museum.

The Liu Changchun Gymnasium at the Dalian University of Technology is named in honor of Liu.

As a sports administrator, Liu served in many capacities:

- In 1964 Liu was elected as a Member of the Fourth Committee of the All-China Sports Federation, and later became a permanent committee member of the sports federation.
- In 1978 Liu served as Member of the Fifth Chinese People's Political Consultative Conference.
- Liu was vice chairman of the Chinese Olympic Committee

Liu is the author of the books Track and Field Instructional Methodology (Chinese: 田径指导法) and Track and Field Judging Methodology (Chinese: 田径裁判法).

== Legacy ==
Liu's life was made into the film The One Man Olympics. It was released in 2008.

== See also ==
- Republic of China at the 1932 Summer Olympics
- Republic of China at the 1936 Summer Olympics
- Yang Chuan-Kwang
