= Athletics at the 1932 Summer Olympics – Men's 100 metres =

Men's 100 metres at the Games of the X Olympiad
- Venue: Los Angeles Memorial Coliseum; Los Angeles, California, U.S.
- Dates: July 31, 1932 (heats, quarterfinals); August 1, 1932 (semifinals, final)
- Competitors: 33 from 17 nations
- Winning time: 10.3 seconds

Medalists
1st place, gold medalist(s)		Eddie Tolan	United States
2nd place, silver medalist(s)		Ralph Metcalfe	United States
3rd place, bronze medalist(s)		Arthur Jonath	Germany

Official Video on YouTube

The men's 100 metres sprint event at the 1932 Summer Olympics in Los Angeles, California, United States, were held at the Los Angeles Memorial Coliseum on July 31 and August 1. Thirty-three runners from 17 nations competed. The 1930 Olympic Congress in Berlin had reduced the limit from 4 athletes per NOC to 3 athletes.

The photo finish final was won by American Eddie Tolan in a world record-equalling time of 10.38 seconds. Teammate Ralph Metcalfe won the silver and was credited with the same time as Tolan. It was the first American victory since 1920, after the United States was kept off the podium entirely in 1928. Germany won its second consecutive bronze medal in the event. Defending Olympic champion and world record holder Percy Williams of Canada did not advance past the semifinals. Takayoshi Yoshioka was the first Asian to make the final.

== Background ==
This was the ninth time the event was held, having appeared at every Olympics since the first in 1896. Notable entrants included Canada's Percy Williams, the defending gold medalist and world record holder, and American Ralph Metcalfe, NCAA champion and U.S. Olympic trial winner.

Two electrical timing devices, one hand-operated and one camera-based, were introduced to "double check" the stop watches.

China was represented in the event for the first time. The United States was the only nation to have appeared at each of the first nine Olympic men's 100 metres events.

== Competition format ==
The event retained the four round format from 1920–1928: heats, quarterfinals, semifinals, and a final. There were 7 heats, of 4–6 athletes each, with the top 3 in each heat advancing to the quarterfinals. The 21 quarterfinalists (19 after two withdrawals) were placed into 4 heats of 4 or 5 athletes. Again, the top 3 advanced. There were 2 heats of 6 semifinalists, once again with the top 3 advancing to the 6-man final.

== Records ==
These are the standing world and Olympic records (in seconds) prior to the 1932 Summer Olympics.

World record	10.3	(Canada) Percy Williams	Toronto (CAN)	August 9, 1930
Olympic Record	10.6	(United States) Donald Lippincott	Stockholm (SWE)	July 6, 1912
Olympic Record	10.6	(United States) Charlie Paddock	Antwerp (BEL)	August 16, 1920
Olympic Record	10.6	(United Kingdom) Harold Abrahams	Paris (FRA)	July 6/7 1924
Olympic Record	10.6	(United States) Robert McAllister	Amsterdam (NED)	July 29/30 1928
Olympic Record	10.6	(Canada) Percy Williams	Amsterdam (NED)	July 30, 1928
Olympic Record	10.6	(South Africa) Wilfred Legg	Amsterdam (NED)	July 30, 1928

Arthur Jonath equalled the standing Olympic record with 10.6 in the third heat of the first round. Eddie Tolan set a new Olympic record with 10.4 in the first heat of the quarterfinals, and in the final, Tolan and Ralph Metcalfe equalled the world record of 10.3.

== Results ==
=== Heats ===
==== Heat 1 ====
Rank	Athlete	Nation	Time	Notes
1	Eddie Tolan	United States	10.9	Q
2	José de Almeida	Brazil	11.0	Q
3	Fernando Ortíz	Mexico	11.2	Q
4	André Théard	Haiti	11.4	
5	António Rodrigues	Portugal	11.5	
–	Fred Reid	Great Britain	DNF	

==== Heat 2 ====
Rank	Athlete	Nation	Time	Notes
1	George Simpson	United States	10.9	Q
2	Ernie Page	Great Britain	11.1	Q
3	Andrej Engel	Czechoslovakia	11.2	Q
4	Bunoo Sutton	India	11.4	
5	Liu Changchun	(Taiwan) China	11.5	

==== Heat 3 ====
Rank	Athlete	Nation	Time	Notes
1	Arthur Jonath	Germany	10.6	Q, OR
2	Allan Elliot	New Zealand	10.8	Q
3	Izuo Anno	Japan	10.9	Q
4	Ronald Vernieux	India	11.0	
5	Samuel Giacosa	Argentina	11.1	

==== Heat 4 ====
Rank	Athlete	Nation	Time	Notes
1	Carlos Bianchi	Argentina	10.8	Q
2	Helmut Körnig	Germany	11.0	Q
3	Percy Williams	Canada	11.1	Q
4	Jesús Moraila	Mexico	11.2	

==== Heat 5 ====
Rank	Athlete	Nation	Time	Notes
1	Ralph Metcalfe	United States	11.0	Q
2	Birchall Pearson	Canada	11.1	Q
3	Angelos Lambrou	Greece	11.3	Q
4	Fernando Ramírez	Mexico	11.4	

==== Heat 6 ====
Rank	Athlete	Nation	Time	Notes
1	Danie Joubert	South Africa	11.0	Q
2	Harold Madison Wright	Canada	11.2	Q
3	Ernst Geerling	Germany	11.3	Q
4	Ricardo Guimarães	Brazil	11.4	

==== Heat 7 ====
Rank	Athlete	Nation	Time	Notes
1	Takayoshi Yoshioka	Japan	10.9	Q
2	Chris Berger	Netherlands	11.1	Q
3	Héctor Berra	Argentina	11.2	Q
4	Stanley Fuller	Great Britain	11.3	
5	Mario Marques	Brazil	11.5	

=== Quarterfinals ===
Berra and Lambrou withdrew before the quarterfinals.

==== Quarterfinal 1 ====
Rank	Athlete	Nation	Time	Notes
1	Eddie Tolan	United States	10.53	Q, OR
2	Carlos Bianchi	Argentina	10.5	Q
3	Percy Williams	Canada	10.7	Q
4	Chris Berger	Netherlands	10.7	
5	Fernando Ortíz	Mexico	11.0	

==== Quarterfinal 2 ====
Rank	Athlete	Nation	Time	Notes
1	George Simpson	United States	10.74	Q
2	Harold Wright	Canada	10.9	Q
3	Helmut Körnig	Germany	11.0	Q
4	Andrej Engel	Czechoslovakia	11.1	

==== Quarterfinal 3 ====
Rank	Athlete	Nation	Time	Notes
1	Ralph Metcalfe	United States	10.77	Q
2	Takayoshi Yoshioka	Japan	10.8	Q
3	Allan Elliot	New Zealand	10.9	Q
4	Ernie Page	Great Britain	10.9	
5	Ernst Geerling	Germany	11.1	

==== Quarterfinal 4 ====
Rank	Athlete	Nation	Time	Notes
1	Arthur Jonath	Germany	10.68	Q
2	Danie Joubert	South Africa	10.6	Q
3	Bert Pearson	Canada	10.7	Q
4	José de Almeida	Brazil	10.8	
5	Izuo Anno	Japan	10.9	

=== Semifinals ===
==== Semifinal 1 ====
The finish was so close that the timing system displayed errors.

Film of the race indicates that Yoshioka won with Joubert second and Tolan third, while officials clocked Tolan at 10.81 seconds, with Joubert also at 10.81 seconds, and Yoshioka at 10.83 seconds.

However, this discrepancy was a moot point, as all three men advanced to the final in any event.

Rank	Athlete	Nation	Time	Notes
1	Eddie Tolan	United States	10.81	Q
2	Danie Joubert	South Africa	10.81	Q
3	Takayoshi Yoshioka	Japan	10.83	Q
4	Percy Williams	Canada	10.91	
5	Allan Elliot	New Zealand	11.0	
6	Helmut Körnig	Germany	11.2	

==== Semifinal 2 ====
Rank	Athlete	Nation	Time	Notes
1	Ralph Metcalfe	United States	10.65	Q
2	George Simpson	United States	10.70	Q
3	Arthur Jonath	Germany	10.71	Q
4	Carlos Bianchi	Argentina	10.73	
5	Bert Pearson	Canada	10.95	
6	Harold Wright	Canada	11.1	

=== Final ===
Under the rules in force at the time, runners were judged to have finished the race when they had crossed the line; in 1933, this was changed so that runners finished the race when they reached the line.

The final was close enough that had this rule been in force at the Games, Metcalfe would have been the winner: Melcalfe reached the finish line first, but Tolan, who was shorter, crossed the line first.

Rank	Athlete	Nation	Time	Notes
1st place, gold medalist(s)	Eddie Tolan	United States	10.38	=WR
2nd place, silver medalist(s)	Ralph Metcalfe	United States	10.38	=WR
3rd place, bronze medalist(s)	Arthur Jonath	Germany	10.50	
4	George Simpson	United States	10.53	
5	Danie Joubert	South Africa	10.60	
6	Takayoshi Yoshioka	Japan	10.79	
