= Tom Cunningham (Australian footballer) =

Australian rules footballer, born 1901

Personal information
- Full name: Thomas Gregory Cunningham
- Born: 30 November 1901; Werribee, Victoria
- Died: 5 December 1964 (aged 63); Pakenham, Victoria
- Original team: Nar Nar Goon
- Height: 175 cm (5 ft 9 in)
- Weight: 73 kg (161 lb)

Playing career^{1}
Years	Club	Games (Goals)
1925	St Kilda	2 (3)
1931	Richmond	2 (2)
Total		4 (5)
- ^{1} Playing statistics correct to the end of 1931.

Thomas Gregory Cunningham (30 November 1901 – 5 December 1964) was an Australian rules footballer who played with St Kilda and Richmond in the Victorian Football League (VFL).

== Family ==
He is the brother of Melbourne footballer Dan Cunningham, the father of Hawthorn footballer Jack Cunningham, and the grandfather of Geelong footballer John Cunningham.

== Football ==
He played his last game of football, for Nar Nar Goon, at the age of 43.

== Death ==
He died at Pakenham, Victoria on 5 December 1964.
