= Teiichi =

- Gender: Male

Origin
- Origin: Japanese
- Meaning: Different meanings depending on the kanji used

Teiichi (written: 貞一) is a masculine Japanese given name. Notable people with the name include:

- Teiichi Matsumaru (松丸 貞一; 1909–1997), Japanese footballer
- Teiichi Nishi (西 貞一; 1907–2001), Japanese sprinter
- Teiichi Okano (岡野 貞一; 1878–1941), Japanese composer
- Teiichi Suzuki (鈴木 貞一; 1888–1989), Japanese general
- Teiichi Yoshimoto (吉本 貞一; 1887–1945), Japanese general

== Fictional characters ==
- Teiichi Niiya (新谷 貞一), protagonist of the manga series Dusk Maiden of Amnesia
