= Andrej Engel =

Slovak sprinter

Personal information
- Nationality: Slovak
- Born: 10 February 1910 Selmecbánya, Austria-Hungary
- Died: 3 December 1991 (aged 81) Malmö, Sweden

Sport
- Country: Czechoslovakia
- Sport: Sprinting
- Event: 100 metres

Andrej Engel (10 February 1910 – 3 December 1991) was a Slovak sprinter who competed at the 1932 Summer Olympics.

== Biography ==
Engel finished third behind Robin Murdoch in the 220 yards event at the 1931 AAA Championships.

At the 1932 Olympics, Engel competed for Czechoslovakia in the men's 100 metres and men's 200 metres
