= Itaro Nakajima =

Japanese sprinter

Personal information
- Nationality: Japanese
- Born: 13 March 1911
- Died: 1993 (aged 81–82)

Sport
- Sport: Sprinting
- Event: 200 metres

Itaro Nakajima (13 March 1911 – 1993) was a Japanese sprinter. He competed in the men's 200 metres, the men's 4 x 100 meters relay, and the men's 4 x 400 meters relay events at the 1932 Summer Olympics events at the 1932 Summer Olympics.
