= Jack Cunningham (footballer) =

Australian rules footballer

Personal information
- Born: 22 November 1940
- Original team: University Blues (VAFA)
- Height: 171 cm (5 ft 7 in)
- Weight: 64 kg (141 lb)

Playing career^{1}
| Years | Club | Games (Goals) |
| 1961–1963 | Hawthorn | 17 (14) |
- ^{1} Playing statistics correct to the end of 1963.

John Cunningham (born 22 November 1940) is a former Australian rules footballer who played for Hawthorn in the VFL. He was a member of the first ever Hawthorn premiership side, playing in the forward pocket in the Grand Final, in only his 7th senior game.

His father Tom Cunningham played for St Kilda and Richmond in the 1920s.
