= Samuel Giacosa =

Argentine sprinter

Personal information
- Nationality: Argentine
- Born: 12 August 1905

Sport
- Sport: Sprinting
- Event: 100 metres

Samuel Giacosa (born 12 August 1905, date of death unknown) was an Argentine sprinter. He competed in the men's 100 metres at the 1932 Summer Olympics.
