= Ernst Geerling =

German sprinter

Personal information
- Nationality: German
- Born: 25 July 1909 Frankfurt, Germany
- Died: 18 August 1971 (aged 62) Frankfurt, Germany

Sport
- Sport: Sprinting
- Event: 100 metres

Ernst Geerling (25 July 1909 – 18 August 1971) was a German sprinter. He competed in the men's 100 metres at the 1932 Summer Olympics.
