= Mario Marques (athlete) =

Brazilian sprinter

Personal information
- Nationality: Brazilian
- Born: 15 May 1909
- Died: 26 July 1975 (aged 66)

Sport
- Sport: Sprinting
- Event: 100 metres

Mario Marques (15 May 1909 – 26 July 1975) was a Brazilian sprinter. He competed in the men's 100 metres at the 1932 Summer Olympics.
