= Republic of China at the 1932 Summer Olympics =

- Flag of the Republic of China
- IOC code: ROC (CHN used at these Games)
- NOC: Chinese Olympic Committee (Note: See Chinese Olympic Committee#Timeline concerning Olympic recognition and Chinese Taipei Olympic Committee#History.)

in Los Angeles
- Competitors: 1 in 1 sport
- Flag bearer: Cheng-Chun Liu
- Medals: Gold 0 Silver 0 Bronze 0 Total 0

Summer Olympics appearances (overview)
- 1924; 1928; 1932; 1936; 1948

Other related appearances
- China (1952–pres.); Chinese Taipei (1956–pres.)

China, as the Republic of China, competed in the Summer Olympic Games for the first time at the 1932 Summer Olympics in Los Angeles, United States.

== Delegation ==
The delegation representing the Republic of China at the Games included the following personnel, as listed in the Official Report of the Games; the names in Chinese are given where known.

=== Executive Officers ===
- C. T. Wang (王正廷), IOC Member for China, President of the Chinese National Olympic Committee (did not attend)
- Wm. Z. L. Sung (沈嗣良), Honorary Secretary General and Acting President of the Chinese NOC, Chef de Mission
- J. C. Shen (申國權), Member of the Chinese NOC
- C. M. Tobin (托平), Member of the Chinese NOC

=== Attaché ===
- Snowpine Liu (劉雪松)

=== Athletes ===
Only one athlete, the sprinter Liu Changchun (劉長春), competed for the Republic of China. He competed in the 100 m and 200 m sprints, and also bore the flag of the ROC.

Yu Hsi-Wei (于希渭), a long-distance runner, was also registered for the Games on 26 June 1932 but was detained by Japanese officials in Manchukuo and did not attend the Games. He is not listed on the roster in the Official Report.

=== Official ===
- Carl F. Song (宋君復), coach of Cheng-Chun Liu

=== Medical ===
- G. L. Chee, M.D., foreign consultant, medical staff of the Games

=== Press ===
- Paul Fung
- James I. Park
- P. M. Slovo Pachinsky
- Aleksandra Kunicka-Sun

=== Film ===
In 2008, a Chinese-language film based on the story of China's participation in the 1932 Olympic games was released, titled The One Man Olympics.

== Athletics ==
Athlete	Event	Heat		Quarterfinal		Semifinal		Final	
Athlete	Event	Result	Rank	Result	Rank	Result	Rank	Result	Rank
Liu Changchun	100 m	11.5	6	Did Not Advance					
Liu Changchun	200 m	23.4	4	Did Not Advance					
