= Fernando Ortiz (athlete) =

Mexican sprinter

Fernando Ortíz
Personal information
- Nationality: Mexican
- Born: 1905

Sport
- Sport: Sprinting
- Event: 100 metres

Fernando Ortiz (born 1905, date of death unknown) was a Mexican sprinter from Baja California. He competed in the men's 100 metres at the 1932 Summer Olympics in Los Angeles.
