= Bert Pearson =

Bert Pearson may refer to:

- Bert Pearson (American football) (1905–1945), American football player
- Birchall Pearson (1914–1960), Canadian athlete
