= José García Narezo =

Mexican artist (1922–1994)

José García Narezo (November 26, 1922 – July 8, 1994) was a Mexican painter and a founding member of the Salón de la Plástica Mexicana.

== Life ==
García Narezo was born in Madrid, Spain. His Mexican mother was Amelia Narezo Dragonné and his father was a Spanish writer, artist and critic, Gabriel García Maroto. José García Narezo went to Mexico in 1928 to study, and later (in 1938) returned to Mexico again to escape from the Spanish Civil War. After that, García Narezo remained permanently in Mexico and received citizenship there. During 1931 and 1932, he studied at the Escuela de Pintura al Aire Libre in Tlalpan, and studied drawing and watercolor in 1935 in Spain. José García Narezo died at age 70 in his home in the Xochimilco borough of Mexico City.

== Career ==
García Narezo made oil paintings, watercolors and drawings, but is known especially for his murals. These include La electricidad al servicio de Sonora in Ciudad Obregón, Sonora and an Italian mosaic at the Plaza Cívica in Lomas de Cuernavaca, Morelos named Juego con luna (1958). One of his murals from 1938, Un niño y la Guerra, is located in the Ministerio de Instrucción in Madrid. García Narezo participated in a large number of collective exhibitions, the most important ones were held at the Arden Gallery in New York (1938), the Museum of Contemporary Art, Los Angeles (1939), the Institute of Modern Art in Boston (1951) and the Salón de la Plástica Mexicana (1951, 1970, 1971).

The artist also had numerous individual exhibitions of his work, including those held at the Spanish embassy in Washington DC (1937), the Gallaudet College Gallery (1937), the Casa de la Cultura in Havana (1938), the Arden Gallery, New York (1938), the Palacio de Bellas Artes (1938), the Stendhal Gallery, Los Angeles (1939), the Los Angeles Museum of Art (1939), the Modern Art Institute in Boston (1940), the Young Memorial Museum in San Francisco (1944), the Fine Arts Gallery in San Francisco (1945), the Pan American Union Gallery in Washington (1949), the ARS Gallery in Mexico City (1953), the Galería de Arte Moderno and the Galería ECO in Mexico City (1956), the Galería Proteo and Galerái ACA in Mexico City (1960), the Galería Diana in Mexico City (1963), the Librería Cristal in Mexico City (1965) and the Salón de la Plástica Mexicana (1970 and 1975). His work was also featured in exhibitions held in Mexico, Europe, Canada and the United States.

In 1945 García Narezo illustrated a reprinted version of the "Book of the People" or Popol Vuh (edited by Ermilio Abreu Gómez) with a series of fourteen watercolors and thirteen drawings.
