= Izuo Anno =

Japanese sprinter (1909–1939)

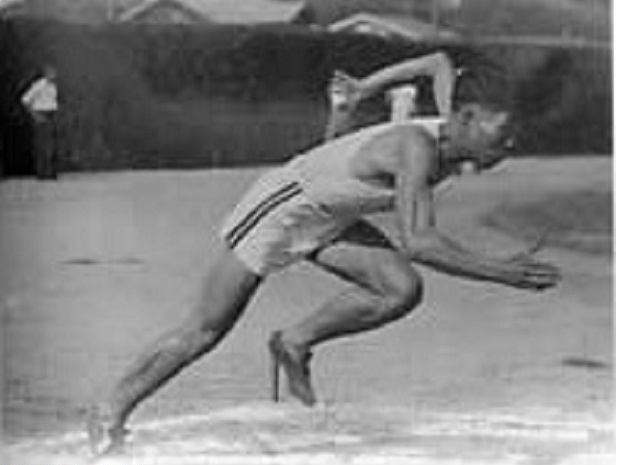
Anno running

Izuo Anno (Japanese: 阿武巌夫) (December 2, 1909 – December 18, 1939) was a Japanese Olympic athlete who participated in the 1932 Summer Olympics in Los Angeles. He was born in Yamaguchi Prefecture. He competed in the 100m and 200m sprints. He was 169 cm tall and weighed 63 kg. He was a graduate of Keio University. During the Second Sino-Japanese War, while undergoing his military service, he was killed in action in Nanning, Guangxi, Republic of China.

== See also ==
- Japan at the 1932 Summer Olympics
