= Edward Mulcock =

New Zealand cricketer (1909–1994)

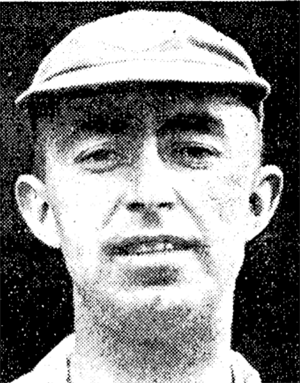
- Mulcock in 1936

Personal information
- Born: 6 July 1909; Christchurch, New Zealand
- Died: 15 July 1994 (aged 85); Christchurch, New Zealand
- Batting: Right-handed
- Bowling: Right-arm medium
- Role: Bowler

Domestic team information
- Years: Team
- 1936/37–1938/39: Canterbury
- 1943/44: Otago
- FC debut: 25 December 1936 Canterbury v Auckland
- Last FC: 25 December 1943 Otago v Canterbury

Career statistics
Competition	First-class
Matches	12
Runs scored	47
Batting average	6.71
100s/50s	0/0
Top score	8 not out
Balls bowled	3,635
Wickets	55
Bowling average	22.43
5 wickets in innings	5
10 wickets in match	0
Best bowling	8/61
Catches/stumpings	8/–
- Source: ESPNcricinfo, 29 January 2020

Edward Mulcock (6 July 1909 – 15 July 1994) was a New Zealand cricketer. He played first-class cricket for Canterbury and Otago between the 1936–37 and 1943–44 seasons.

Ted Mulcock was born at Christchurch in 1909 and educated at Christchurch Boys' High School. A tall, medium-paced in-swing bowler with an "easy" bowling action, he became the third bowler to take a hat-trick in the Plunket Shield when he took 8 for 61 for Canterbury in Otago's second innings in December 1937. In his next representative match a few days later, (Note: Mulcock's Wisden obituary states that this was the previous match he had played, but this is not the case.) he took 6 for 53 in Wellington's first innings. Despite Mulcock's bowling figures, Canterbury lost both matches.

Mulcock played in a total of 12 first-class matches, nine of which were for Canterbury. He made his first-class debut in December 1936, playing in a fixture which started on Christmas Day against Auckland at Lancaster Park, Canterbury's home ground. He played in all three of Canterbury's fixtures in the Punket Shield during the season and was also selected for a combined Canterbury and Otago side to play the touring MCC side in March 1937. (Note: During this period touring English international sides played as under the Marylebone Cricket Club name when they were not playing Test matches against other national sides. The team that toured New Zealand in 1937 had played five Test matches against Australia before arriving in New Zealand to play three additional first-class matches, including one against a New Zealand representative side. They did not play a Test match in New Zealand on the tour.) He played in all of Canterbury's Shield fixtures for the following two seasons, taking 44 wickets for the side in his nine representative matches for the province.

During World War II Mulcock served in the New Zealand Army. He played some wartime cricket, appearing twice in minor matches for a Combined Services XI against Canterbury and once for the provincial side against an Otago XI. In February 1943 he played a first-class fixture for a South Island Army side against North Island Army, taking two wickets in the match. (Note: This was one of only two first-class fixtures played in New Zealand in the 1943–44 season.) His final first-class match was for Otago (Note: A number of the members of the Otago side were unable to travel to Christchurch for this match and local players, including Mulcock, were made available for selection in their place.) against Canterbury at Lancaster Park in December 1943. (Note: The Plunket Shield was not contested after the 1939–40 season until the war was over, returning in the 1945–46 season.) Despite Mulcock's five-wicket haul in the first innings of the match, Otago lost by an innings. In total, he took 55 wickets in first-class matches at a bowling average of 22.43 runs per wicket. Generally batting last in an innings, he scored 47 runs with a highest score of eight not out.

Mulcock worked as a teacher, working away from Canterbury for five cricket seasons in the early 1930s. He retired in 1974, having been the headteacher of Banks Avenue primary school in Christchurch for 18 years. He played club cricket until he was more than 65. He died at Christchurch in July 1994 aged 85.
