= Carlos Bianchi (athlete) =

Argentine sprinter

Personal information
- Nationality: Argentine
- Born: 19 December 1910
- Died: 20 October 1935 (aged 24)

Sport
- Sport: Sprinting
- Event: 100 metres

Carlos Bianchi (19 December 1910 – 20 October 1935) was an Argentine sprinter. He competed in the men's 100 metres at the 1932 Summer Olympics.
