= Danie Joubert =

South African sprinter (1909–1997)

Personal information
- Nationality: South African
- Born: 8 February 1909 Dundee, Colony of Natal
- Died: 2 March 1997 (aged 88) Pretoria, South Africa

Sport
- Sport: Sprinting
- Event: 100 yards

Danie Joubert (8 February 1909 – 2 March 1997) was a South African sprinter. He competed in the men's 100 metres at the 1932 Summer Olympics.
