= António Rodrigues =

Portuguese sprinter

Personal information
- Nationality: Portuguese
- Born: 29 October 1905
- Died: 17 July 1994 (aged 88)

Sport
- Sport: Sprinting
- Event: 100 metres

António Rodrigues (29 October 1905 – 17 July 1994) was a Portuguese sprinter. He competed in the men's 100 metres at the 1932 Summer Olympics.
