= Willie Walters =

South African sprinter

Medal record

Men's athletics

Representing South Africa

British Empire Games
Silver medal – second place	1930 Hamilton	440 yards
Bronze medal – third place	1930 Hamilton	220 yards
Bronze medal – third place	1930 Hamilton	4×110 yards
Bronze medal – third place	1930 Hamilton	4×440 yards

William John Walters (31 July 1907 – 15 July 1994) was a South African athlete who competed in the 1932 Summer Olympics.

He was born in Wakkerstroom and died in Scottburgh.

In 1932 he finished fourth the 400 metres event and sixth in the 200 metres competition.

At the 1930 Empire Games he won the silver medal in the 440 yards event and the bronze medal in the 200 yards. With the South African relay team he won the bronze medal in the 4×110 yards contest as well as in the 4×440 yards event.
