= Ricardo Guimarães (athlete) =

Brazilian sprinter

Personal information
- Nationality: Brazilian
- Born: 4 January 1909
- Died: 14 January 1974 (aged 65)

Sport
- Sport: Sprinting
- Event: 100 metres

Ricardo Guimarães (4 January 1909 – 14 January 1974) was a Brazilian sprinter. He competed in the men's 100 metres at the 1932 Summer Olympics.
