= George Simpson (sprinter) =

American sprinter (1908–1961)

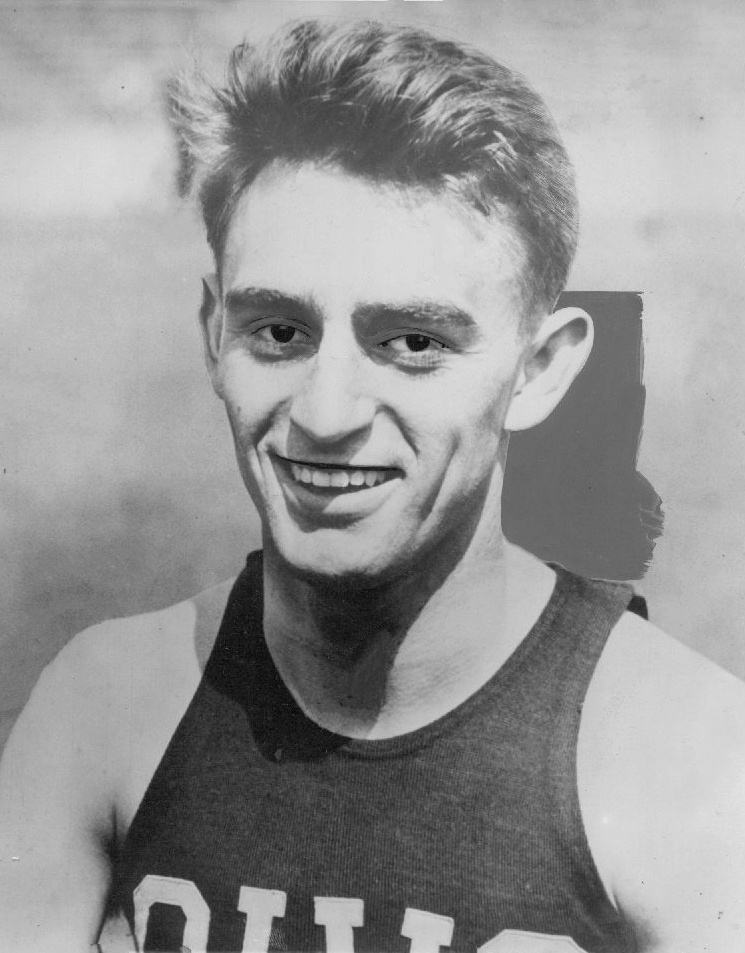
- Simpson in 1929

Personal information
- Full name: George Sidney Simpson
- Born: September 21, 1908 Columbus, Ohio, U.S.
- Died: December 2, 1961 (aged 53) Columbus, Ohio, U.S.
- Height: 5 ft 11 in (1.80 m)
- Weight: 165 lb (75 kg)

Sport
- Country: United States
- Sport: Athletics
- Event: Sprint
- Club: Cincinnati Athletic Club

Achievements and titles
- Personal bests: 100 yd – 9.4 (1929); 100 m – 10.3 (1930); 200 m – 21.0 (1929)
Medal record
Men's athletics
Representing the United States
Olympic Games
Silver medal – second place	1932 Los Angeles	200 m

George Sidney Simpson (September 21, 1908 – December 2, 1961) was an American sprinter. He competed at the 1932 Olympics and won a silver medal in the 200 m, placing fourth in the 100 m event. Simpson was the first to run 100 yards in 9.4 seconds, but because he used starting blocks, the record was never ratified. He won the 220 yards (200 m) in both NCAA and AAU in 1930. He was also fourth in the 100 meters at the 1932 Olympics. In 1929 he unofficially equaled the 200 meters World Record 20.6 seconds. Simpson attended Ohio State and won a national title in 1929.

== Competition record ==
Year	Competition	Venue	Position	Event	Notes
Representing United States
1932	Olympics	Los Angeles, United States	4th	100 m	10.53
1932	Olympics	Los Angeles, United States	2nd	200 m	21.4
