= Allan Elliot =

New Zealand sprinter (1906–1973)

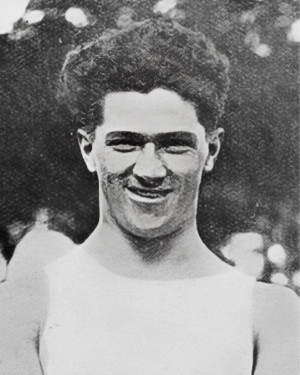
- Elliot in 1929

Personal information
- Born: Allan John Elliot; 1 February 1906 Thames, New Zealand
- Died: 5 January 1973 (aged 66) Auckland, New Zealand
- Occupation: Grocer
- Height: 1.78 m (5 ft 10 in)
- Spouses: Eunice Elva Edwina Macdonald (m. 1933; died 1958) Barbara Ann Elliot

Sport
- Country: New Zealand
- Sport: Athletics

Achievements and titles
- National finals: 100 yds champion (1929, 1930, 1932); 220 yds champion (1929, 1932)

Allan John Elliot (1 February 1906 – 5 January 1973), sometimes Elliott, was a New Zealand athlete, who represented his country in the sprint events at the 1930 British Empire Games in Hamilton, Ontario, and the 1932 Olympic Games in Los Angeles.

== Early life and family ==
Born in Thames on 1 February 1906, Elliot was the son of Matthew Halliday Elliot and Edith Amy Elliot (née Cryer). On 8 June 1933 he married Eunice Elva Edwina Macdonald, but they later separated, and Eunice Elliot died in 1958. Elliot's second wife was Barbara Ann Elliot.

== Athletics ==
Regarded as a "brilliant sprinter" who was "heavily muscled", Elliot won five New Zealand national athletics titles: the 100 yards in 1929, 1930, and 1932; and the 220 yards in 1929 and 1932. Elliot 's best time of 9.8 second for 100 yards stood as the New Zealand record for over 20 years.

At the 1930 British Empire Games, Elliot did not progress beyond the heats of the 100 yards and 220 yards. However, at the 1932 Olympics he reached the semi-finals of both the 100 m and 200 m events.

Elliot later continued his involvement in athletics as an administrator, and served as president of the Waitakere Golf Club for five years.

== Later life and death ==
Elliot spent most of his working life as a grocer, and was a relieving manager at various shops in Auckland during his last five years. He died on 5 January 1973, and his body was cremated at Waikumete.

== Legacy ==
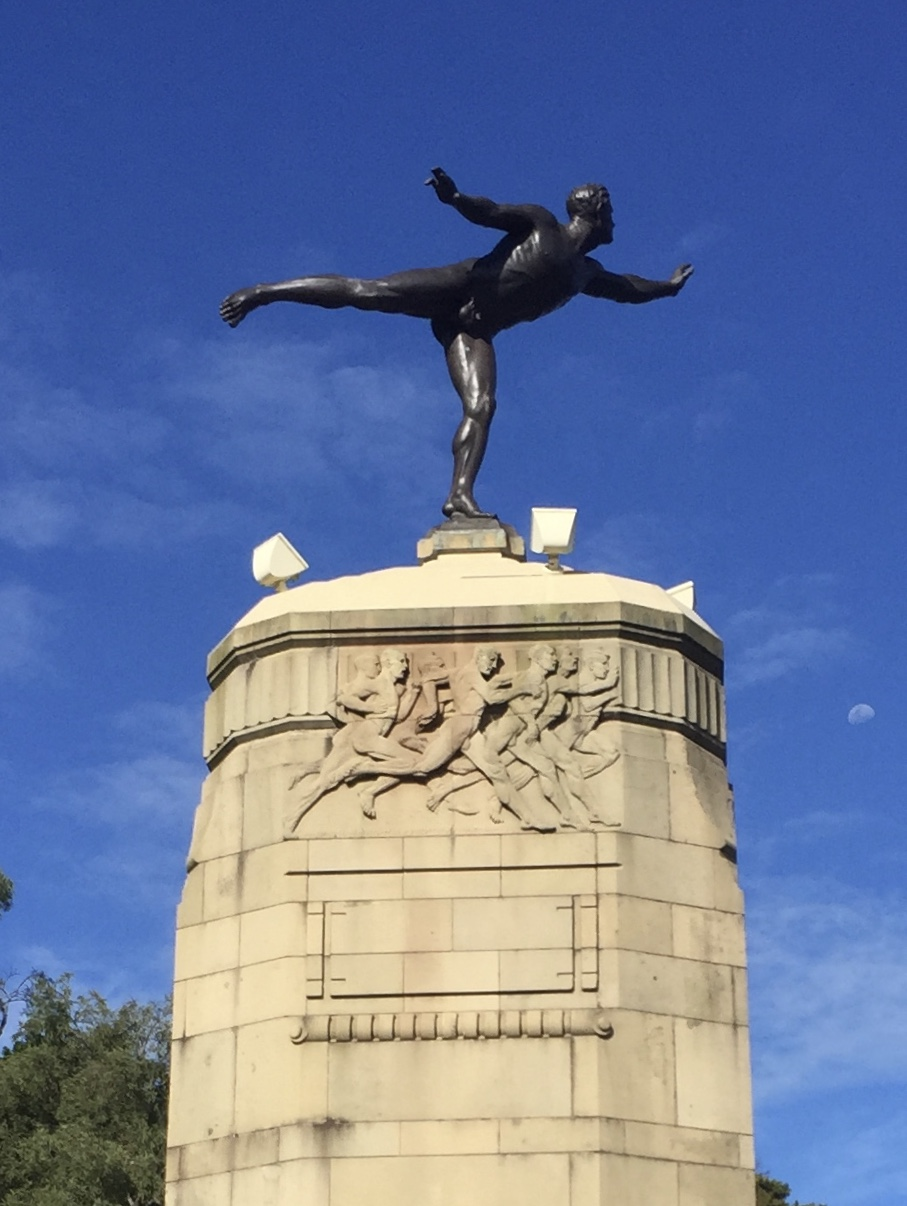
Sculpture of an athlete by Richard Oliver Gross at the Auckland Domain gate, for which Elliot was the model

Elliot modelled for the sculpture of an athlete by Richard Oliver Gross at the Auckland Domain gates.

== Competition record ==
Year	Competition	Venue	Position	Event	Notes
Representing New Zealand
1930	British Empire Games	Hamilton, Canada	3rd (ht 3)	100 y	NT
