= Teiichi Nishi =

Japanese sprinter

Personal information
- Nationality: Japanese
- Born: 31 August 1907
- Died: 3 February 2001 (aged 93)

Sport
- Sport: Sprinting
- Event: 200 metres

Teiichi Nishi (西貞一, 31 August 1907 – 3 February 2001) was a Japanese sprinter. He competed in the men's 200 metres and the men's 4 x 400 meters relay events at the 1932 Summer Olympics.
