= Yu Xiwei =

Chinese middle-distance runner

Personal information
- Nationality: Chinese
- Born: 1909-1980 Jinzhou, Liaoning Province, China

Sport
- Country: People's Republic of China
- Sport: Long-distance running

Yu Xiwei 于希谓 (1909–1980) was a Chinese middle-distance runner. He was born in Jinzhou, located in the southwest of Liaoning Province. In 1942 and 1943, in the sports meeting held in Tokyo Shinto shrine Athletic Center, he won several times. So he earned the title of "The Far East" (远东之雄).

== Introduction ==
He attended the Jinzhou agricultural school. After graduating from Jinzhou at twenty, he chose to teach in a local school. After "9 · September 18" (九一八事变), he interrupted college and went home to teach at the national excellent school. In June 1933, he went to new Beijing (in Changchun) to get jobs, he has worked in the state council and the people's livelihood puppet of will and went to Taiwan before the founding of the People's Republic went to Taiwan.

== Early life ==
Yu Xiwei became enthusiastic about running in his childhood, especially long distance and middle-distance running. Once, he had a race with the train. They set out at the same time and arrived at destination at the same time. So during that time he was called "The Scud" (飞毛腿).

In 1930, in the track and field track of Dalian China Youth Association, Yu Xiwei made a new record for the 800 meters long-distance race with only 2 minutes grade. He had participated in many sports meetings. Yu Xiwei had attended sports meetings held at home and abroad about 34 times through his life and achieved 50 championships. Therefore, he was worthy of the name "Iron Feet" (铁脚)

== Achievements ==
- Broke the record of 800 meters with 2 minutes grade in Dalian China Youth Association
- Won the champion of the 800 and 1500 meters in the nationwide seventh sports meeting when he was at the age of 40
- Achieved 50 championships
