= Dan Cunningham (footballer) =

Australian rules footballer (born 1907)

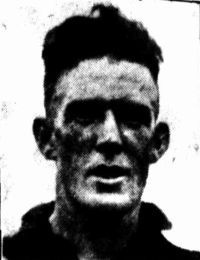

Personal information
- Full name: Dan Cunningham
- Born: 23 November 1907
- Died: 5 July 1994 (aged 86)
- Original team: Nar Nar Goon

Playing career^{1}
Years	Club	Games (Goals)
1932	Melbourne	1 (0)
- ^{1} Playing statistics correct to the end of 1932.

Dan Cunningham (23 November 1907 – 5 July 1994) was an Australian rules footballer who played with Melbourne in the Victorian Football League (VFL).
