= Harold Madison Wright =

Canadian engineer and athlete

Harold Wright CC

President, Canadian Field Hockey Association
- In office 1966–1969

President, Canadian Olympic Association
- In office 1969–1977

Director, Organizing Committee, Montreal Olympic Games
- In office 1970–1977

Governor, Olympic Trust
- In office 1970–1997

Director, Commonwealth Games Association of Canada
- In office 1972–1977

Personal details
- Born: Harold Madison Wright; December 10, 1908 Winnipeg, Manitoba
- Died: December 11, 1997 (aged 89) Vancouver, British Columbia
- Education: University of Utah; University of British Columbia
- Profession: Engineer

Harold Madison Wright, CC (December 10, 1908 – December 11, 1997) was a Canadian engineer and athlete.

Born in Winnipeg, Manitoba, he received a B.Sc in geological engineering and a M.Sc in metallurgical engineering from the University of Utah. He also received an MA in geology from the University of British Columbia. In 1947 he established a consulting firm called Wright Engineers.

He competed in athletics (100 m, 200 m and 4 × 100 m relay) at the 1932 Summer Olympics.

From 1964 to 1968 he was president of the Canadian Field Hockey Association. From 1969 to 1977 he was president of the Canadian Olympic Association, during the first Olympic Games to be hosted in Canada. He also served as director of the Commonwealth Games Association of Canada and the British Columbia Sports Federation.

== Honours ==
Wright is the recipient of the following honours and awards:

- In 1977 he was made an Officer of the Order of Canada and was promoted to Companion in 1986.
- In 1979 he was awarded the Olympic Order in silver.
- In 1981 he was awarded an honorary degree of Doctor of Laws from the University of British Columbia.
- In 1987 he was inducted into the Canadian Amateur Sports Hall of Fame.
- In 2003 he was inducted into Canadian Olympic Hall of Fame.
- He was inducted into the Canadian Mining Hall of Fame.
