= Wrestling at the 1932 Summer Olympics – Men's Greco-Roman welterweight =

Men's Greco-Roman welterweight at the Games of the X Olympiad
- Venue: Grand Olympic Auditorium
- Dates: 4–7 August 1932
- Competitors: 8 from 8 nations

Medalists
1st place, gold medalist(s)		Ivar Johansson	Sweden
2nd place, silver medalist(s)		Väinö Kajander	Finland
3rd place, bronze medalist(s)		Ercole Gallegati	Italy

The men's Greco-Roman welterweight competition at the 1932 Summer Olympics in Los Angeles took place from 4 August to 7 August at the Grand Olympic Auditorium. Nations were limited to one competitor. It was the first appearance of the event; at the previous two Olympics, the welterweight class had been exclusive to freestyle wrestling. This weight class was limited to wrestlers weighing up to 72 kg.

This Greco-Roman wrestling competition followed the same format that was introduced at the 1928 Summer Olympics, using an elimination system based on the accumulation of points. Each round featured all wrestlers pairing off and wrestling one bout (with one wrestler having a bye if there were an odd number). The loser received 3 points. The winner received 1 point if the win was by decision and 0 points if the win was by fall. At the end of each round, any wrestler with at least 5 points was eliminated.

== Schedule ==
Date	Event
4 August 1932	Round 1
5 August 1932	Round 2
6 August 1932	Round 3 Round 4
7 August 1932	Final round

== Results ==
=== Round 1 ===
Johansson and Kajander won by fall, earning 0 points in the first round. Jensen and Käpp won by decision, earning 1 point. Dahl, Gallegati, and Yoshida's losses put them at 3 points each, while Zombori was injured in his loss and abandoned the competition.

Bouts

Winner	Nation	Victory Type	Loser	Nation
Børge Jensen	Denmark	Decision	Arild Dahl	Norway
Ivar Johansson	Sweden	Fall	Gyula Zombori	Hungary
Osvald Käpp	Estonia	Decision	Ercole Gallegati	Italy
Väinö Kajander	Finland	Fall	Shuichi Yoshida	Japan

Points

Rank	Wrestler	Nation	Start	Earned	Total
1	Ivar Johansson	Sweden	0	0	0
1	Väinö Kajander	Finland	0	0	0
3	Børge Jensen	Denmark	0	1	1
3	Osvald Käpp	Estonia	0	1	1
5	Arild Dahl	Norway	0	3	3
5	Ercole Gallegati	Italy	0	3	3
5	Yoshida Shiichi	Japan	0	3	3
8	Julius Zombori	Hungary	0	3	3r

=== Round 2 ===
Johansson and Kajander both stayed at 0 points, the former with a second win by fall and the latter with a bye. Kapp won a second consecutive bout by decision, earning a second point; the other decision-winner from the first round, Jensen, lost to move to 4 points. Gallegati stayed at 3 points by following his initial loss with a win by fall. Dahl and Yoshida were both eliminated at 0–2.

Bouts

Winner	Nation	Victory Type	Loser	Nation
Ivar Johansson	Sweden	Fall	Arild Dahl	Norway
Osvald Käpp	Estonia	Decision	Børge Jensen	Denmark
Ercole Gallegati	Italy	Fall	Yoshida Shiichi	Japan
Väinö Kajander	Finland	Bye	N/A	N/A

Points

Rank	Wrestler	Nation	Start	Earned	Total
1	Ivar Johansson	Sweden	0	0	0
1	Väinö Kajander	Finland	0	0	0
3	Osvald Käpp	Estonia	1	1	2
4	Ercole Gallegati	Italy	3	0	3
5	Børge Jensen	Denmark	1	3	4
6	Arild Dahl	Norway	3	3	6
6	Yoshida Shiichi	Japan	3	3	6

=== Round 3 ===
Johansson (3–0) and Kajander (2–0 with a bye) both stayed perfect, with all wins by fall. Their opponents in this round, Käpp and Jensen, both were eliminated. Gallegati moved on with 3 points still after a bye in this round.

Bouts

Winner	Nation	Victory Type	Loser	Nation
Ivar Johansson	Sweden	Fall	Osvald Käpp	Estonia
Väinö Kajander	Finland	Fall	Børge Jensen	Denmark
Ercole Gallegati	Italy	Bye	N/A	N/A

Points

Rank	Wrestler	Nation	Start	Earned	Total
1	Ivar Johansson	Sweden	0	0	0
1	Väinö Kajander	Finland	0	0	0
3	Ercole Gallegati	Italy	3	0	3
4	Osvald Käpp	Estonia	2	3	5
5	Børge Jensen	Denmark	4	3	7

=== Round 4 ===
Johansson and Kajander still had all of their wins by fall, with Kajander eliminating Gallegati and Johansson having a bye.

Bouts

Winner	Nation	Victory Type	Loser	Nation
Väinö Kajander	Finland	Fall	Ercole Gallegati	Italy
Ivar Johansson	Sweden	Bye	N/A	N/A

Points

Rank	Wrestler	Nation	Start	Earned	Total
1	Ivar Johansson	Sweden	0	0	0
1	Väinö Kajander	Finland	0	0	0
3rd place, bronze medalist(s)	Ercole Gallegati	Italy	3	3	6

=== Final round ===
In the bout between the last two wrestlers, each of whom had won all previous bouts by fall, Johansson won by decision.

Bouts

Winner	Nation	Victory Type	Loser	Nation
Ivar Johansson	Sweden	Decision	Väinö Kajander	Finland

Points

Rank	Wrestler	Nation	Start	Earned	Total
1st place, gold medalist(s)	Ivar Johansson	Sweden	0	1	1
2nd place, silver medalist(s)	Väinö Kajander	Finland	0	3	3
