= Estonia at the 1932 Summer Olympics =

- IOC code: EST
- NOC: Estonian Olympic Committee

in Los Angeles
- Competitors: 2 (men) in 2 sports
- Flag bearer: Osvald Käpp
- Medals: Gold 0 Silver 0 Bronze 0 Total 0

Summer Olympics appearances (overview)
- 1920; 1924; 1928; 1932; 1936; 1948–1988; 1992; 1996; 2000; 2004; 2008; 2012; 2016; 2020; 2024

Other related appearances
- Russian Empire (1908–1912); Soviet Union (1952–1988)

Estonia competed at the 1932 Summer Olympics in Los Angeles, United States.

== The 1932 Estonian Olympic Team ==
Estonian Olympic Committee did not send a full team to the Olympic games due to financial problems and tried to recruit Estonians living in the United States. Most of them were not prepared to compete on short notice, and only Alfred Maasik and Osvald Käpp agreed.

Representatives

Estonian National Olympic representative was professor Ants Piip. Estonian attaché was an electrical engineer Charles Kodil.

Other delegations

Estonians in other delegations were Kalevi Kotkas for Finland in athletics; August Lootus was a reserve for the United States in sailing; the 1924 Summer Olympics bronze medalist Aleksander Klumberg was an athletics coach for Poland; and Valter Palm was a boxing coach for Finland.

== Athletics ==
Men
Track & road events

Athlete	Event	Heat		Quarterfinal		Semifinal		Final	
Athlete	Event	Result	Rank	Result	Rank	Result	Rank	Result	Rank
Alfred Maasik	50 km walk	—N/a						6:19.00	10

== Wrestling ==
Men's Greco-Roman

Athlete	Event	Elimination Pool					Final round	
Athlete	Event	Round 1 Result	Round 2 Result	Round 3 Result	Round 4 Result	Rank	Final round Result	Rank
Osvald Käpp	−72 kg	Ercole Gallegati (ITA); W	Børge Jensen (DEN); W	Ivar Johansson (SWE); L F 8:39	—N/a	4	Did not advance	

Men's Freestyle

Athlete	Event	Elimination Pool					Final round	
Athlete	Event	Round 1 Result	Round 2 Result	Round 3 Result	Round 4 Result	Rank	Final round Result	Rank
Osvald Käpp	−66 kg	Charles Pacôme (FRA); L	Károly Kárpáti (HUN); L	—N/a		6	Did not advance	
