= Wrestling at the 1932 Summer Olympics – Men's freestyle welterweight =

Athletic competition

Men's freestyle welterweight at the Games of the X Olympiad
- Venue: Grand Olympic Auditorium
- Dates: 1–3 August 1932
- Competitors: 9 from 9 nations

Medalists
| 1st place, gold medalist(s) | | Jack van Bebber | United States |
| 2nd place, silver medalist(s) | | Daniel MacDonald | Canada |
| 3rd place, bronze medalist(s) | | Eino Leino | Finland |

The men's freestyle welterweight competition at the 1932 Summer Olympics in Los Angeles took place from 1 August to 3 August at the Grand Olympic Auditorium. Nations were limited to one competitor. This weight class was limited to wrestlers weighing up to 72kg.

This freestyle wrestling competition did not use the single-elimination bracket format previously used for Olympic freestyle wrestling but instead followed the format that was introduced at the 1928 Summer Olympics for Greco-Roman wrestling, using an elimination system based on the accumulation of points. Each round featured all wrestlers pairing off and wrestling one bout (with one wrestler having a bye if there were an odd number). The loser received 3 points. The winner received 1 point if the win was by decision and 0 points if the win was by fall. At the end of each round, any wrestler with at least 5 points was eliminated.

== Schedule ==
| Date | Event |
|---|---|
| 1 August 1932 | Round 1 |
| 2 August 1932 | Round 2 Round 3 |
| 3 August 1932 | Round 4 Final round |

== Results ==
=== Round 1 ===
Of the four bouts, three were won by fall to give the victors 0 points, along with Zombori who had a bye. Földeak had the only win by decision, starting with 1 point. The four losers each received 3 points. Lopez withdrew after his loss.

Bouts

| Winner | Nation | Victory Type | Loser | Nation |
|---|---|---|---|---|
| Daniel MacDonald | Canada | Fall | Yoshio Kono | Japan |
| Eino Leino | Finland | Fall | Ludvig Lindblom | Sweden |
| Jack van Bebber | United States | Fall | Raúl López | Mexico |
| Jean Földeak | Germany | Decision | Børge Jensen | Denmark |
| Julius Zombori | Hungary | Bye | N/A | N/A |

Points

| Rank | Wrestler | Nation | Start | Earned | Total |
|---|---|---|---|---|---|
| 1 | Jack van Bebber | United States | 0 | 0 | 0 |
| 1 | Eino Leino | Finland | 0 | 0 | 0 |
| 1 | Daniel MacDonald | Canada | 0 | 0 | 0 |
| 1 | Julius Zombori | Hungary | 0 | 0 | 0 |
| 5 | Jean Földeak | Germany | 0 | 1 | 1 |
| 6 | Børge Jensen | Denmark | 0 | 3 | 3 |
| 6 | Kohno Yoshio | Japan | 0 | 3 | 3 |
| 6 | Ludvig Lindblom | Sweden | 0 | 3 | 3 |
| 9 | Raul Lopez | Mexico | 0 | 3 | 3r |

=== Round 2 ===
All three of the remaining first-round losers lost again and were eliminated. In the bout between two 0-point wrestlers, MacDonald won by fall to stay at 0 points.

Bouts

| Winner | Nation | Victory Type | Loser | Nation |
|---|---|---|---|---|
| Daniel MacDonald | Canada | Fall | Julius Zombori | Hungary |
| Eino Leino | Finland | Decision | Kohno Yoshio | Japan |
| Jean Földeak | Germany | Decision | Ludvig Lindblom | Sweden |
| Jack van Bebber | United States | Decision | Børge Jensen | Denmark |

Points

| Rank | Wrestler | Nation | Start | Earned | Total |
|---|---|---|---|---|---|
| 1 | Daniel MacDonald | Canada | 0 | 0 | 0 |
| 2 | Jack van Bebber | United States | 0 | 1 | 1 |
| 2 | Eino Leino | Finland | 0 | 1 | 1 |
| 4 | Jean Földeak | Germany | 1 | 1 | 2 |
| 5 | Julius Zombori | Hungary | 0 | 3 | 3 |
| 6 | Børge Jensen | Denmark | 3 | 3 | 6 |
| 6 | Kohno Yoshio | Japan | 3 | 3 | 6 |
| 6 | Ludvig Lindblom | Sweden | 3 | 3 | 6 |

=== Round 3 ===
Leino won by default (Zombori defaulting and being eliminated) and Földeak had a bye, staying at 1 and 2 points, respectively. The only contested bout featured van Bebber and MacDonald, with the American beating the Canadian by decision.

Bouts

| Winner | Nation | Victory Type | Loser | Nation |
|---|---|---|---|---|
| Jack van Bebber | United States | Decision | Daniel MacDonald | Canada |
| Eino Leino | Finland | Default | Julius Zombori | Hungary |
| Jean Földeak | Germany | Bye | N/A | N/A |

Points

| Rank | Wrestler | Nation | Start | Earned | Total |
|---|---|---|---|---|---|
| 1 | Eino Leino | Finland | 1 | 0 | 1 |
| 2 | Jack van Bebber | United States | 1 | 1 | 2 |
| 2 | Jean Földeak | Germany | 2 | 0 | 2 |
| 4 | Daniel MacDonald | Canada | 0 | 3 | 3 |
| 5 | Julius Zombori | Hungary | 3 | 3 | 6 |

=== Round 4 ===
MacDonald eliminated Földeak in this round, leaving three wrestlers. The bout between Leino and van Bebber therefore became the final and was considered part of the final round.

Bouts

| Winner | Nation | Victory Type | Loser | Nation |
|---|---|---|---|---|
| Daniel MacDonald | Canada | Decision | Jean Földeak | Germany |
| Eino Leino | Finland | Bye | N/A | N/A |
| Jack van Bebber | United States | Bye | N/A | N/A |

Points

| Rank | Wrestler | Nation | Start | Earned | Total |
|---|---|---|---|---|---|
| 1 | Eino Leino | Finland | 1 | 0 | 1 |
| 2 | Jack van Bebber | United States | 2 | 0 | 2 |
| 3 | Daniel MacDonald | Canada | 3 | 1 | 4 |
| 4 | Jean Földeak | Germany | 2 | 3 | 5 |

=== Final round ===
Van Bebber defeated Leino to win the gold medal. Leino then faced MacDonald for the silver and bronze; the Canadian prevailed.

Bouts

| Winner | Nation | Victory Type | Loser | Nation |
|---|---|---|---|---|
| Jack van Bebber | United States | Decision | Eino Leino | Finland |
| Daniel MacDonald | Canada | Fall | Eino Leino | Finland |

Points

| Rank | Wrestler | Nation | Start | Earned | Total |
|---|---|---|---|---|---|
| 1st place, gold medalist(s) | Jack van Bebber | United States | 2 | 1 | 3 |
| 2nd place, silver medalist(s) | Daniel MacDonald | Canada | 4 | 0 | 4 |
| 3rd place, bronze medalist(s) | Eino Leino | Finland | 1 | 6 | 7 |
