= Timothy H. Ball =

Indiana writer (1826–1913)

Timothy Horton Ball
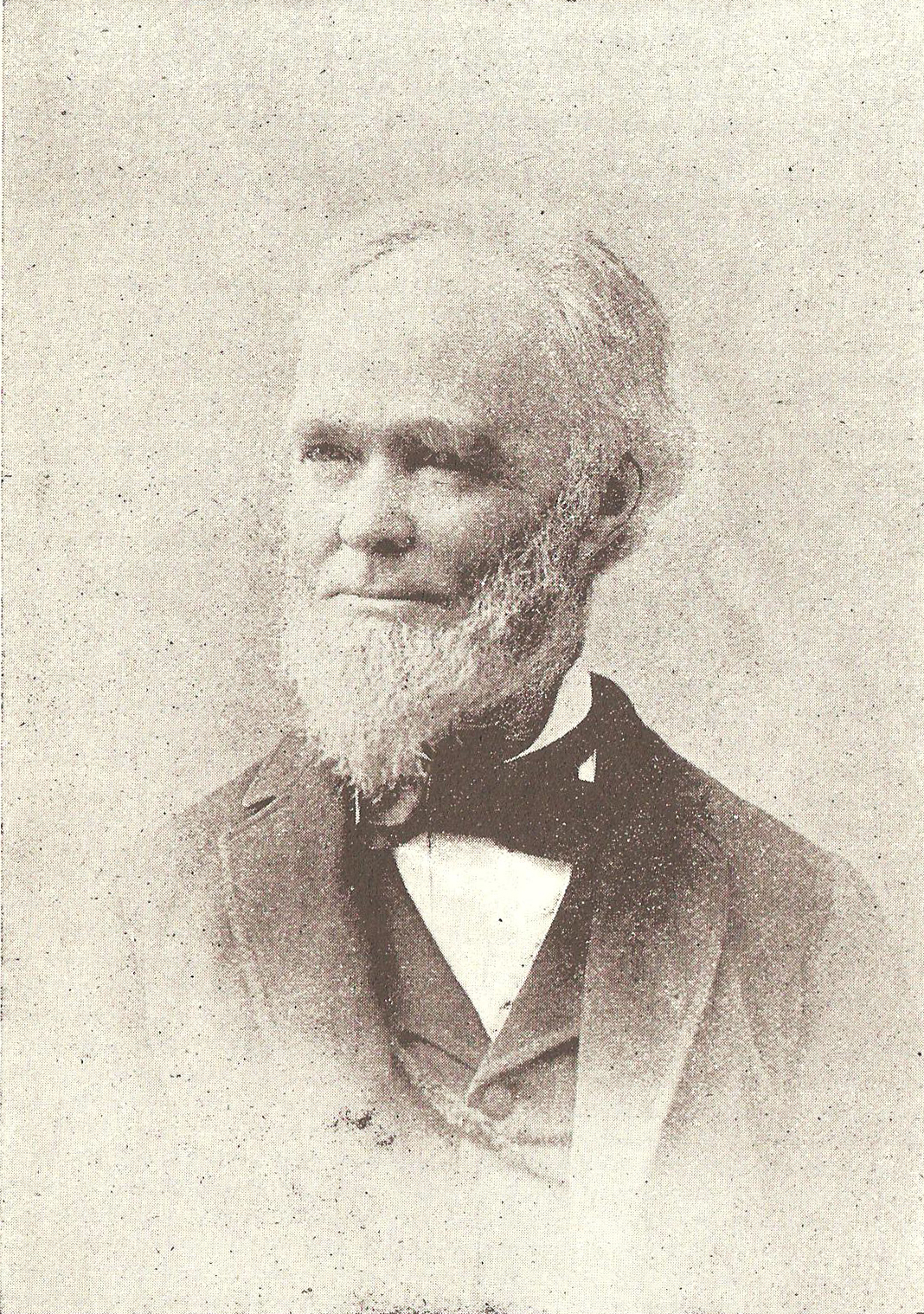
- Born: February 16, 1826; Agawam, Hampden County, Massachusetts
- Died: November 8, 1913 (aged 87); Sheffield, Colbert County, Alabama
- Occupation: Historian
- Spouse: Martha Caroline Creighton
- Writing career
- Notable works: The Creek War of 1813 and 1814

Timothy Horton Ball (February 16, 1826 – November 8, 1913) was an American historian, missionary, preacher, author, and teacher. He is known for writing The Creek War of 1813 and 1814. The book is a well-known source for Choctaw and Creek Indian history.

== Personal life ==
Ball was born on February 16, 1826, in Massachusetts. Ball came from a wealthy New England family and was able to receive a baccalaureate and master's degree from Franklin College. He later earned a divinity degree from Newton Theological Institution in 1863.

Ball was a prolific writer. As a historian, he made intricate notes with former settlers. Many of his books are hundreds of pages in length. His works can be found in the Library of Congress.

Ball died on November 8, 1913, at Sheffield, Alabama. He was buried in Clarke County, Alabama.

== Works ==
- Ball, Timothy H.Lake County, Indiana, from 1834 to 1872. Chicago : J.W. Goodspeed, 1873.
- Ball, Timothy H. and Henry S. Halbert.The Creek War of 1813 and 1814. Chicago, Illinois: Donohue & Henneberry; Montgomery, Alabama: White, Woodruff, & Fowler, 1895.
- Ball, Timothy H. Northwestern Indiana from 1800 to 1900; or, A view of our region through the nineteenth century. Chicago: Donohue & Henneberry, printers, 1900.
- Ball, Timothy H. Francis Ball's Descendants, Or, the West Springfield Ball Family from 1640 to 1902. Press of J. J. Wheeler, 1902.
- Ball, Timothy H. Encyclopedia of genealogy and biography of Lake County, Indiana, with a compendium of history, 1834-1904 : a record of the achievements of its people in the making of a commonwealth and the founding of a nation. Evansville, Ind. : Unigraphic, 1904.
- Ball, T. H. (Timothy Horton), A Glance into the Great South-East, or, Clarke County, Alabama, and Its Surroundings, from 1540 to 1877. Grove Hill, Ala.: J.F. McMoy, 1882.

== See also ==
- William Bartram
- Cyrus Byington
- Horatio B. Cushman
- Angie Debo
- Henry S. Halbert
- Gideon Lincecum
- John R. Swanton
- Library of Congress, Works by Timothy Horton Ball
