= Raúl López =

Raúl López may refer to:

- Raúl López del Castillo (1893–1963), Cuban lawyer
- Raúl López (baseball) (born 1929), Cuban baseball player
- Raúl López (wrestler) (fl. 1932), Mexican wrestler
- Raül López (basketball) (born 1980), Spanish basketball player
- Raúl López (footballer, born 1976), Spanish football left-back
- Raúl López (footballer, born 1993), Mexican football winger
- Raúl López Mayorga, Ecuadorian Roman Catholic bishop
