= Angie Debo =

American historian (1890–1988)

- Born: January 30, 1890; Beattie, Kansas, U.S.
- Died: February 21, 1988 (aged 98); Enid, Oklahoma, U.S.
- Education: University of Chicago; University of Oklahoma
- Occupations: Historian, librarian
- Writing career
- Period: 20th century
- Genre: Nonfiction
- Subjects: Native American History; History of Oklahoma
- Notable works: The Rise and Fall of the Choctaw Republic (1934); And Still the Waters Run (1940) "The Road to Disappearance: A History of the Creek Indians" (1941) "Tulsa: From Creek Town to Oil Capital" (1943) "The Diary of Charles Hazelrigg" (1947) "Oklahoma: Foot-loose and Fancy-free" (1949) "The Five Civilized Tribes of Oklahoma: Report on Social and Economic Conditions" (1951) "Prairie City: The Story of an An American Community" (1969); A History of the Indians of the United States (Civilization of the American Indian Series) (1974); Geronimo: The Man, His Time, His Place (1976)
- Movement: Anti-Turnerian

Angie Elbertha Debo (January 30, 1890 – February 21, 1988), was an American historian who wrote 13 books and hundreds of articles about Native American and Oklahoma history. After a long career marked by difficulties (ascribed both to her gender and to the controversial content of some of her books), she was acclaimed as Oklahoma's "greatest historian" and acknowledged as "an authority on Native American history, a visionary, and an historical heroine in her own right."

== Biography ==
=== Early life and education ===
Born in Beattie, Kansas, in 1890, Angie Debo moved with her parents, Edward P. and Lina E. in a covered wagon to the Oklahoma Territory when she was nine years old. Her family settled in the rural community of Marshall, where Debo would live, on and off, for the rest of her life. She earned a teacher's certificate and began teaching when she was 16. Because Marshall did not have a high school until 1910, Debo did not receive her high school diploma until 1913, when she was 23 years old.

=== Education and early career ===
She soon went on to the University of Oklahoma, where she earned an A.B. degree in history in 1918. She taught history at Enid High School for four years before taking time to study at the University of Chicago, where she earned a master's degree in international relations in 1924. Her master's thesis (co-authored with her thesis supervisor J. Fred Rippy) was published in 1924 as part of the Smith College Studies in History, under the title The Historical Background of the American Policy of Isolationism. The historian Manfred Jonas has written that this was the first "scholarly literature" on the subject of American isolationism.

Despite this early success, Debo said that she found it difficult to obtain a teaching position because most college history departments at the time would not consider hiring a woman. Nevertheless, from 1924 until 1933, she taught at West Texas State Teachers College in Canyon, Texas, and was curator of its Panhandle-Plains Historical Museum, while working towards a PhD in history at the University of Oklahoma, which she received in 1933.

=== The Rise and Fall of the Choctaw Republic ===
Debo's dissertation, published by the University of Oklahoma Press as The Rise and Fall of the Choctaw Republic (1934), examined the effects of the American Civil War on the Choctaw Tribe. It received the John H. Dunning Prize of the American Historical Association. University of Oklahoma Press director Savoie Lottinville later described this book as a "pioneering effort" in Native American history that gave the effect of "seeing events from inside the tribe, rather than from a purely Anglo-American perspective."

=== And Still the Waters Run ===
Debo's next book was more controversial. Completed in 1936, And Still the Waters Run detailed how, after their forced removal from the southeastern United States, the Five Civilized Tribes were systematically deprived in Indian Territory of the lands and resources granted to them by federal treaty. Debo wrote that these treaties were supposed to protect the tribal lands "as long as the waters run, as long as the grass grows"; but, after the 1887 Dawes Act enacted a policy of private ownership that was eventually forced on the tribes, the system was manipulated by whites to swindle the Indians out of their property. In the words of historian Ellen Fitzpatrick, Debo's book "advanced a crushing analysis of the corruption, moral depravity, and criminal activity that underlay white administration and execution of the allotment policy."

Debo's charges were controversial; and many of the actors were still alive. The book's conclusions were strongly resisted by some parties. The University of Oklahoma Press withdrew as publisher, and Debo's academic career was sidetracked. She took a position writing for the Federal Writers' Project in Oklahoma during the Great Depression, but her work for the travel guide Oklahoma: A Guide to the Sooner State was extensively revised without her permission.

And Still the Waters Run: The Betrayal of the Five Civilized Tribes was finally published in 1940 by Princeton University Press. Joseph A. Brandt, the former director of the University of Oklahoma Press, had moved to Princeton and published the book there. The seminal book is now described as a classic and a major influence on writers of Native American history, from Oliver LaFarge to Vine Deloria, Jr. and Larry McMurtry.

=== Later career ===
Debo "never found a permanent position in an academic history department." For a time after publication of And Still the Waters Run, she was barred from teaching in Oklahoma. But, in her later years she received increasing acclaim and recognition. Her work was seen as a rebuttal to the Frontier Thesis of Frederick Jackson Turner, presenting a history of westward expansion based not on the ideal of manifest destiny but on the exploitation of the Native Americans. She was a lifelong Democrat, and said Henry Bellmon was the only Republican ever to receive her vote. Debo served on the board of directors of the Association on American Indian Affairs, and of the Oklahoma chapter of the American Civil Liberties Union.

She also continued to publish extensively. She wrote one novel, Prairie City, the Story of an American Community (1944), based on the history of her hometown Marshall. She finished her last history book, Geronimo: The Man, His Time, His Place, at the age of 85, and it was first published by University of Oklahoma Press in 1976. It has been reissued in new editions.

== Honors and legacy ==
- Her last book received a Western Wrangler award from the National Cowboy Hall of Fame and Western Heritage Center (now called the National Cowboy & Western Heritage Museum).
- Debo was inducted into the Oklahoma Hall of Fame in 1950.
- She was inducted into the Oklahoma Women's Hall of Fame in 1984.
- She received honorary degrees from Wake Forest University and Phillips University.
- She received awards from the American Historical Association, Western History Association, American Indian Historians Association, and American Association for State and Local History, among many others.
- 1985, the State of Oklahoma commissioned an official portrait of Debo by artist Charles Banks Wilson; it was placed in the rotunda of the Oklahoma State Capitol building in Oklahoma City.
- 1987 – The American Historical Association gave her its Award for Scholarly Distinction. Governor Henry Bellmon presented this award to her at a January 1988 ceremony in Marshall.
- 1988 - Profiled in the first season of the PBS documentary series American Experience.

Debo died a few weeks later, on February 21, 1988, at the age of 98. She left her papers, books, and literary rights to Oklahoma State University, where she had worked as a librarian and researcher.

=== Posthumous recognition ===
- 1994, Edmond Public Schools named an elementary school after her.
- 1997 – Debo received the Ralph Ellison Award from the Oklahoma Center for the Book.
- She is one of the 21 Oklahoma writers featured on the state's official Literary Map of Oklahoma.
- 1988 – Debo was the subject of an episode entitled "Indians, Outlaws, and Angie Debo", of the PBS series The American Experience.
- 2000 – The University of Oklahoma Press published a biography of Debo written by Shirley A. Leckie and entitled Angie Debo: Pioneering Historian.
- Her work has been the subject of numerous monographs and articles.
- 2007 – In his inaugural address, Oklahoma Governor Brad Henry called Debo "our state's greatest historian." He quoted Debo's 1949 observation about Oklahoma's unusual history:

Oklahoma is more than just another state. It is a lens in which the long rays of time are focused into the brightest of light. In its magnifying clarity, dim facets of the American character stand more clearly revealed. For in Oklahoma all the experiences that went into the making of the nation have been speeded up. Here all the American traits have been intensified. The one who can interpret Oklahoma can grasp the meaning of America in the modern world.

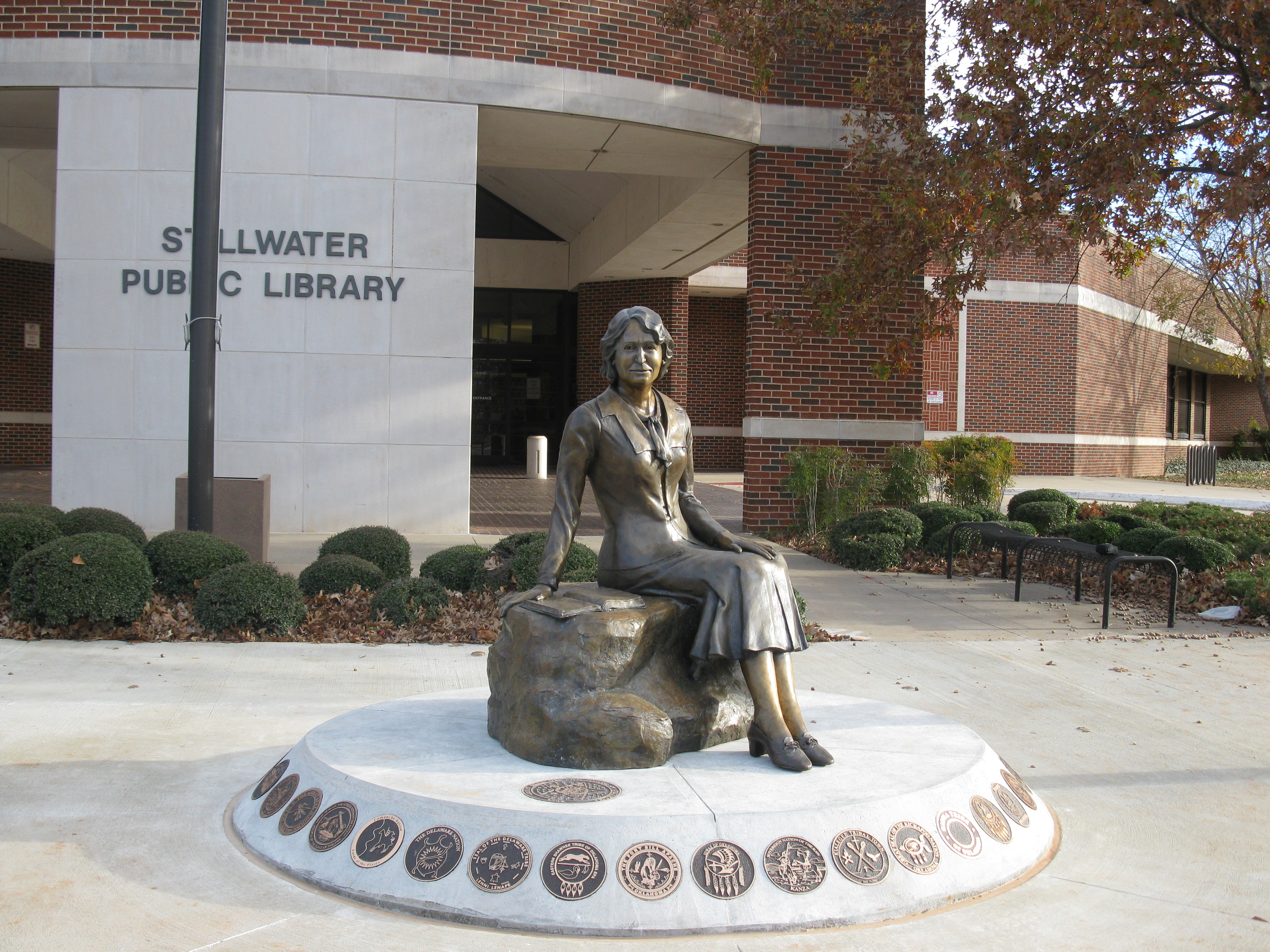
Angie Debo statue by Phyllis Mantik

- 2010 – The Stillwater Public Library in Stillwater, Oklahoma, dedicated a bronze statue of Angie Debo on Nov 18, 2010. Created by local artist, Phyllis Mantik, the statue depicts a young Angie Debo sitting on a rock with several books by her side. The artist chose the young Debo to focus on her character and highlight that at an early age, she chose the life of a scholar rather than what was expected of a woman of her time. To symbolize the importance of Debo's work to Oklahoma's Native American tribes, the base of the statue has replicas of the seals of Oklahoma's 38 federally recognized Native American tribes. The state seal of Oklahoma is located at the top of the base. Near the statue is a plaque describing Angie Debo's life and her importance to the community, the state and the nation.

== Bibliography ==
=== Books written by Debo ===
Following is a list of books written by Angie Debo. Works she edited are listed in the next section below:

- The Historical Background of the American Policy of Isolation, by J. Fred Rippy & Angie Debo (Northampton, Mass.: Smith College Studies in History, 1924).
- The Rise and Fall of the Choctaw Republic (Norman: University of Oklahoma Press, 1934, 2nd edition, 1961), ISBN 0-585-19818-7.
- And Still the Waters Run: The Betrayal of the Five Civilized Tribes (Princeton: Princeton University Press, 1940; new edition, Norman: University of Oklahoma Press, 1984), ISBN 0-691-04615-8.
- The Road to Disappearance: A History of the Creek Indians (Norman: University of Oklahoma Press, 1941; new edition, 1979), ISBN 0-8061-1532-7.
- Tulsa: From Creek Town to Oil Capital (Norman: University of Oklahoma Press, 1943).
- Novel: Prairie City: The Story of an American Community (New York: Knopf, 1944; new edition, Tulsa: Council Oak Books, 1986; new edition, Norman: University Press of Oklahoma, 1998), ISBN 0-8061-2066-5.
- Oklahoma: Foot-Loose and Fancy-Free. Norman: University of Oklahoma Press, 1949; new edition, 1987, ISBN 0-8061-2066-5.
- The Five Civilized Tribes of Oklahoma: A Report on Social and Economic Conditions (Philadelphia: Indian Rights Association, 1951).
- A History of the Indians of the United States (Norman: University of Oklahoma Press, 1970), ISBN 0-8061-1888-1, (new edition, 2013), available online at Googlebooks.
- Geronimo: The Man, His Time, His Place (Norman: University of Oklahoma Press, 1976/1982), ISBN 0-8061-1828-8, almost all available online at Googlebooks.

=== Books edited by Debo ===
- Oklahoma: A Guide to the Sooner State, edited by Angie Debo and John M. Oskison (Norman: University of Oklahoma Press, 1941).
- The Cowman's Southwest: Being the Reminiscences of Oliver Nelson, Freighter, Camp Cook, Cowboy, Frontiersman in Kansas, Indian Territory, Texas, and Oklahoma, 1878–1893, by Oliver Nelson, edited by Angie Debo, The Western Frontiersman Series, 4 (Glendale, Ca.: A.H. Clark Co., 1953; new edition, Lincoln: University of Nebraska Press, 1986), ISBN 0-8032-8356-3.
- History of the Choctaw, Chickasaw, and Natchez Indians, by Horatio B. Cushman, edited by Angie Debo (Stillwater, Ok.: Redlands Press, 1962; new edition, Norman: University of Oklahoma Press, 1999), ISBN 0-8061-3127-6.
- With Five Reservations, by Dell O'Hara, edited by Angie Debo and Harold H. Leake (Aurora, Mo.: Creekside Publications, 1986).

== See also ==
- Timothy H. Ball
- William Bartram
- Daniel Boone
- Cyrus Byington
- Horatio B. Cushman
- Henry S. Halbert
- Gideon Lincecum
- John R. Swanton
