= Wrestling at the 1932 Summer Olympics – Men's freestyle lightweight =

Men's freestyle lightweight at the Games of the X Olympiad
- Venue: Grand Olympic Auditorium
- Dates: 1–3 August 1932
- Competitors: 8 from 8 nations

Medalists
1st place, gold medalist(s)		Charles Pacôme	France
2nd place, silver medalist(s)		Károly Kárpáti	Hungary
3rd place, bronze medalist(s)		Gustaf Klarén	Sweden

The men's freestyle lightweight competition at the 1932 Summer Olympics in Los Angeles took place from 1 August to 3 August at the Grand Olympic Auditorium. Nations were limited to one competitor. This weight class was limited to wrestlers weighing up to 66kg.

This freestyle wrestling competition did not use the single-elimination bracket format previously used for Olympic freestyle wrestling but instead followed the format that was introduced at the 1928 Summer Olympics for Greco-Roman wrestling, using an elimination system based on the accumulation of points. Each round featured all wrestlers pairing off and wrestling one bout (with one wrestler having a bye if there were an odd number). The loser received 3 points. The winner received 1 point if the win was by decision and 0 points if the win was by fall. At the end of each round, any wrestler with at least 5 points was eliminated.

== Schedule ==
Date	Event
1 August 1932	Round 1 Round 2
2 August 1932	Round 3
3 August 1932	Round 4 Final round

== Results ==
=== Round 1 ===
Kárpáti was the only winner by fall and therefore the only wrestler to advance with 0 points. The other three winners each received 1 point for wins by decision. The four losers each received 3 points.

Bouts

Winner	Nation	Victory Type	Loser	Nation
Gustaf Klarén	Sweden	Decision	Howard Thomas	Canada
Melvin Clodfelter	United States	Decision	Kustaa Pihlajamäki	Finland
Károly Kárpáti	Hungary	Fall	Eitaro Suzuki	Japan
Charles Pacôme	France	Decision	Osvald Käpp	Estonia

Points

Rank	Wrestler	Nation	Start	Earned	Total
1	Károly Kárpáti	Hungary	0	0	0
2	Melvin Carl Clodfelter	United States	0	1	1
2	Gustaf Klarén	Sweden	0	1	1
2	Charles Pacôme	France	0	1	1
4	Osvald Käpp	Estonia	0	3	3
4	Kustaa Pihlajamäki	Finland	0	3	3
4	Suzuki Eitaro	Japan	0	3	3
4	Howard Thomas	Canada	0	3	3

=== Round 2 ===
Klarén against Clodfelter was a bout between two first-round winners, each of whom were safe from elimination. Klarén won by fall to stay at 1 point; Clodfelter's loss took him to 4 points. Both bouts pitting a 1–0 wrestler against an 0–1 wrestler ended in the first-round winner winning again (Pacôme staying at 1 point with a win by fall, Kárpáti picking up his first point via win by decision) and the first-round loser eliminated. The bout between two first-round losers resulted in Thomas being the man eliminated and Pihlajamäki holding on at 4 points.

Bouts

Winner	Nation	Victory Type	Loser	Nation
Gustaf Klarén	Sweden	Fall	Melvin Carl Clodfelter	United States
Kustaa Pihlajamäki	Finland	Decision	Howard Thomas	Canada
Charles Pacôme	France	Fall	Suzuki Eitaro	Japan
Károly Kárpáti	Hungary	Decision	Osvald Käpp	Estonia

Points

Rank	Wrestler	Nation	Start	Earned	Total
1	Károly Kárpáti	Hungary	0	1	1
1	Gustaf Klarén	Sweden	1	0	1
1	Charles Pacôme	France	1	0	1
4	Melvin Carl Clodfelter	United States	1	3	4
4	Kustaa Pihlajamäki	Finland	3	1	4
6	Osvald Käpp	Estonia	3	3	6
6	Suzuki Eitaro	Japan	3	3	6
6	Howard Thomas	Canada	3	3	6

=== Round 3 ===
Pacôme had a bye this round, staying at 1 point. The two contested bouts each featured a 1-point wrestler against a 4-point wrestler; in both cases, the 4-point wrestler won. Clodfelter initially won by fall, which would have resulted in his staying in the competition, but the officials declared a rematch. This time, Clodfelter won by decision. Pihlajamäki also won by decision. Both winners, therefore, picked up their fifth point and were the only wrestlers eliminated in the round despite each winning.

Bouts

Winner	Nation	Victory Type	Loser	Nation
Kustaa Pihlajamäki	Finland	Decision	Gustaf Klarén	Sweden
Melvin Carl Clodfelter	United States	Decision	Károly Kárpáti	Hungary
Charles Pacôme	France	Bye	N/A	N/A

Points

Rank	Wrestler	Nation	Start	Earned	Total
1	Charles Pacôme	France	1	0	1
2	Károly Kárpáti	Hungary	1	3	4
2	Gustaf Klarén	Sweden	1	3	4
4	Melvin Carl Clodfelter	United States	4	1	5
4	Kustaa Pihlajamäki	Finland	4	1	5

=== Round 4 ===
Pacôme defeated Klarén to eliminate the latter, who received the bronze medal. Pacôme and Kárpáti (who had a bye) advanced to the final.

Bouts

Winner	Nation	Victory Type	Loser	Nation
Charles Pacôme	France	Decision	Gustaf Klarén	Sweden
Károly Kárpáti	Hungary	Bye	N/A	N/A

Points

Rank	Wrestler	Nation	Start	Earned	Total
1	Charles Pacôme	France	1	1	2
2	Károly Kárpáti	Hungary	4	0	4
3rd place, bronze medalist(s)	Gustaf Klarén	Sweden	4	3	7

=== Final round ===
Pacôme defeated Kárpáti in the final to take the gold medal.

Bouts

Winner	Nation	Victory Type	Loser	Nation
Charles Pacôme	France	Decision	Károly Kárpáti	Hungary

Points

Rank	Wrestler	Nation	Start	Earned	Total
1st place, gold medalist(s)	Charles Pacôme	France	2	1	3
2nd place, silver medalist(s)	Károly Kárpáti	Hungary	4	3	7
