= Marshall, Oklahoma =

- Town
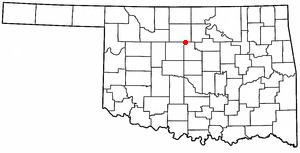
- Location of Marshall, Oklahoma
- Coordinates: 36°08′58″N 97°37′23″W
- Country: United States
- State: Oklahoma
- County: Logan

Area
  - Total: 0.64 sq mi (1.65 km^{2})
  - Land: 0.64 sq mi (1.65 km^{2})
  - Water: 0 sq mi (0.00 km^{2})
- Elevation: 1,053 ft (321 m)

Population (2020)
  - Total: 210
  - Density: 330.4/sq mi (127.56/km^{2})
- Time zone: UTC-6 (Central (CST))
  - Summer (DST): UTC-5 (CDT)
- ZIP code: 73056
- Area code: 580
- FIPS code: 40-46650
- GNIS feature ID: 2412958

Marshall is a rural town in Logan County, Oklahoma, United States, and is an outer suburb/exurb on the northern edge of the Oklahoma City Metropolitan Statistical Area. The population was 210 as of the 2020 United States census.

== History ==
Marshall began as a community when the Unassigned Lands were opened for settlement in 1889. Sylvan T. Rice opened a post office in 1890. Rice was from Marshalltown, Iowa and named the new town Marshall after his home town. He also opened the first store in 1894. The town boomed after the opening of the Cherokee Strip in 1893.

The Denver, Enid and Gulf Railroad built a track nearby a few years later in 1902 a half-mile from town so the entire town moved to be near the railroad. Marshall was incorporated in 1903. The railroad was bought by the Eastern Oklahoma Railway in 1907, which resold it to the Atchison, Topeka & Santa Fe Railroad in the same year.

Famous Oklahoma author Dr. Angie Debo was from Marshall, Oklahoma. She died in 1988. She had written many books about the fate of Indians. Her portrait hangs in the Oklahoma Capitol. Miss Debo wrote a book called Prairie City which was loosely based on Marshall, and Marshall started a town celebration in 1968 in honor of Miss Debo called Prairie City Days.

Marshall was known as the school band "capital" of the world in the 1940s. Area schools would come to compete and march down main street. It was known as "The Biggest Little Band Festival in the World" and was held from 1938 to 1951. It was founded by Tibby Shades (school superintendent) and Ashley Alexander Sr. (band director). It was cancelled in 1952 due to the state band contest being scheduled on the same date and was never revived. It grew to such magnitude that WKY radio out of Oklahoma City broadcast the marching band performances held on main street. The Oklahoma Highway Patrol increased participation on festival day to assist with the traffic situation. Fifty-Seven towns converged on Marshall in 1951 to participate in the festival with sixty-five performing groups. It is believed 5,000 participated in the 1951 festival.

Marshall's two-story brick school was built in 1904 and in the 1950s the second story was torn down and classes was built around the first story.

Marshall's had its last high school graduating class in 1976. It continued as a middle school (grades 5–8) until 1988 when the school closed its doors for good. Today most of the roof has fallen in. The gymnasium is the only part of the school that is still in good shape. Today it is used for the annual volunteer firemen's rib dinner. People come from all around to attend and it averages over 1000 people.

Marshall is said to have the widest main street in the USA. It is said that a team of horses made a "U" turn and that determined how wide they made main street. Also, it is said that when the town was moved 1/2 mile west in order to be located adjacent to the railroad, the city fathers, when laying out the town site, decided to make the streets wide enough to accommodate angle parking at the curbs, two lanes of traffic, and sufficient room for street cars. It was thought if Marshall should ever become a large city like Chicago that having the streets wide enough would be of great benefit. The main street lacks six feet being as wide as a football field which was perfect for marching band performances during the band festival.

Outlaw Dick Yeager alias Zip Wyatt was shot and killed 5 miles (8.0 km) SW of Marshall. Miss Debo wrote in one of her books that the Dalton gang stopped in one time and bought supplies from the general merchandise store and left with no problems.

There are two cemeteries in Marshall. One that used to be called Pleasant Ridge or today called South Marshall IOOF and the North Marshall IOOF.

Back in the town's prime between 1900 and 1980 it had two gas stations, a hotel, 5-dime store, drug store, cafe, bar, grocery store, laundromat, hardware store, lawyer office, bank, doctor office, blacksmith, barber shop, beauty shop, fire station, arcade, movie theatre, two car dealers and farmers' co-op. Today all that is left is the co-op and post office. Where main street was once lined with cars on Saturdays is now pretty much a ghost town. Most of the building downtown are or have fallen down or empty. During the 1980s the oil bust happened and the town hasn't been the same ever since.

Marshall is mostly populated by farmers and people who commute to nearby cities to work. The main agriculture is wheat and cattle.

In 1927, SW of Marshall, an oil field was found called Roxanna. Production was found in the Ordovician Wilcox Sand at depths of ~6000' with initial production rates as high as 2,450 bbl/d (390 m^{3}/d). A boom town started and oil hands filtered into Marshall. There is nothing left of Roxanna today.

== Geography ==
According to the United States Census Bureau, the town has a total area of 0.5 square mile (1.3 km^{2}), all land.

== Demographics ==
Historical population
Census	Pop.	Note	%±
1910	622		—
1920	434		−30.2%
1930	695		60.1%
1940	382		−45.0%
1950	386		1.0%
1960	363		−6.0%
1970	420		15.7%
1980	372		−11.4%
1990	288		−22.6%
2000	258		−10.4%
2010	272		5.4%
2020	210		−22.8%
U.S. Decennial Census

=== 2020 census ===
As of the 2020 census, Marshall had a population of 210. The median age was 44.1 years. 21.9% of residents were under the age of 18 and 15.2% of residents were 65 years of age or older. For every 100 females there were 110.0 males, and for every 100 females age 18 and over there were 115.8 males age 18 and over.

There were 92 households in Marshall, of which 43.5% had children under the age of 18 living in them. Of all households, 50.0% were married-couple households, 20.7% were households with a male householder and no spouse or partner present, and 23.9% were households with a female householder and no spouse or partner present. About 21.8% of all households were made up of individuals and 4.3% had someone living alone who was 65 years of age or older.

There were 104 housing units, of which 11.5% were vacant. The homeowner vacancy rate was 1.3% and the rental vacancy rate was 0.0%.

Racial composition as of the 2020 census
Race	Number	Percent
White	176	83.8%
Black or African American	1	0.5%
American Indian and Alaska Native	7	3.3%
Asian	0	0.0%
Native Hawaiian and Other Pacific Islander	0	0.0%
Some other race	6	2.9%
Two or more races	20	9.5%
Hispanic or Latino (of any race)	17	8.1%

=== 2000 census ===
As of the census of 2000, there were 258 people, 105 households, and 78 families residing in the town. The population density was 511.1 inhabitants per square mile (197.3/km^{2}). There were 134 housing units at an average density of 265.5 per square mile (102.5/km^{2}). The racial makeup of the town was 93.02% White, 3.88% Native American, 1.55% from other races, and 1.55% from two or more races. Hispanic or Latino of any race were 3.88% of the population.

There were 105 households, out of which 26.7% had children under the age of 18 living with them, 61.9% were married couples living together, 9.5% had a female householder with no husband present, and 24.8% were non-families. 22.9% of all households were made up of individuals, and 17.1% had someone living alone who was 65 years of age or older. The average household size was 2.46 and the average family size was 2.86.

In the town, the population was spread out, with 20.5% under the age of 18, 10.9% from 18 to 24, 24.0% from 25 to 44, 22.5% from 45 to 64, and 22.1% who were 65 years of age or older. The median age was 40 years. For every 100 females, there were 95.5 males. For every 100 females age 18 and over, there were 95.2 males.

The median income for a household in the town was $25,000, and the median income for a family was $28,056. Males had a median income of $27,188 versus $19,167 for females. The per capita income for the town was $11,585. About 19.4% of families and 19.0% of the population were below the poverty line, including 14.0% of those under the age of 18 and 23.2% of those 65 or over.

=== Historic sites ===
(Main article: National Register of Historic Places listings in Logan County, Oklahoma)

Marshall has two NRHP-registered sites, being the Methodist Church of Marshall off State Highway 74, and Angie Debo House at 200 Oklahoma Ave.

== Notable people ==
- Melvin Clodfelter (1904–1983), NCAA wrestling champion and Olympic wrestler (1932)
- Angie Debo (1890–1988), writer of Oklahoma and Native American history
- Ike Williams (1902–1988), football player at Georgia Tech and in the AFL (1926) and NFL (1929)
