= Clodfelter =

Clodfelter is a surname. Notable people with the surname include:

- Dan Clodfelter (born 1950), American politician and attorney
- Mark Clodfelter (born 1950), American politician
- Melvin Clodfelter (1904–1983), American wrestler
- Todd Clodfelter (born 1957), American politician
