= Eitarō =

- Gender: Male

Origin
- Origin: Japanese
- Meaning: Different meanings depending on the kanji used

Eitarō, Eitaro, Eitarou or Eitaroh (written: 英太郎, 栄太郎, 榮太郎 or 鋭太郎) is a masculine Japanese given name. Notable people with the name include:

- Eitaro Deguchi (出口 栄太郎; born 1948), Japanese golfer
- Hitachiiwa Eitarō (常陸岩 英太郎; 1900–1957), Japanese sumo wrestler
- Eitaro Ishigaki (石垣 栄太郎; 1893–1958), Japanese-born American artist
- Eitaro Itoyama (糸山 英太郎; born 1942), Japanese businessman and politician
- Eitaro Mabuchi (馬淵 鋭太郎; 1867–1943), Japanese politician
- Eitaro Matsuda (松田 詠太郎; born 2001), Japanese footballer
- Eitaro Noro (野呂 榮太郎; 1900–1934), Japanese economic historian
- Eitaro Okano (岡野 栄太郎; born 1930), Japanese sprinter
- Eitaro Ozawa (小沢 栄太郎; 1909–1988), Japanese actor
- Eitarō Shindō (進藤 英太郎; 1899–1977), Japanese actor
- Eitaro Suzuki (鈴木 英太郎), Japanese sport wrestler
- Eitaro Uchiyama (内山 英太郎; 1887–1973), Japanese general
