= Klaren =

Klaren or Klarén is a surname. Notable people with the surname include:

- Georg C. Klaren (1900–1962), Austrian screenwriter and film director
- Gustaf Klarén (1906–1984), Swedish wrestler
