= Cyrus Byington =

American missionary linguist (1793–1868)

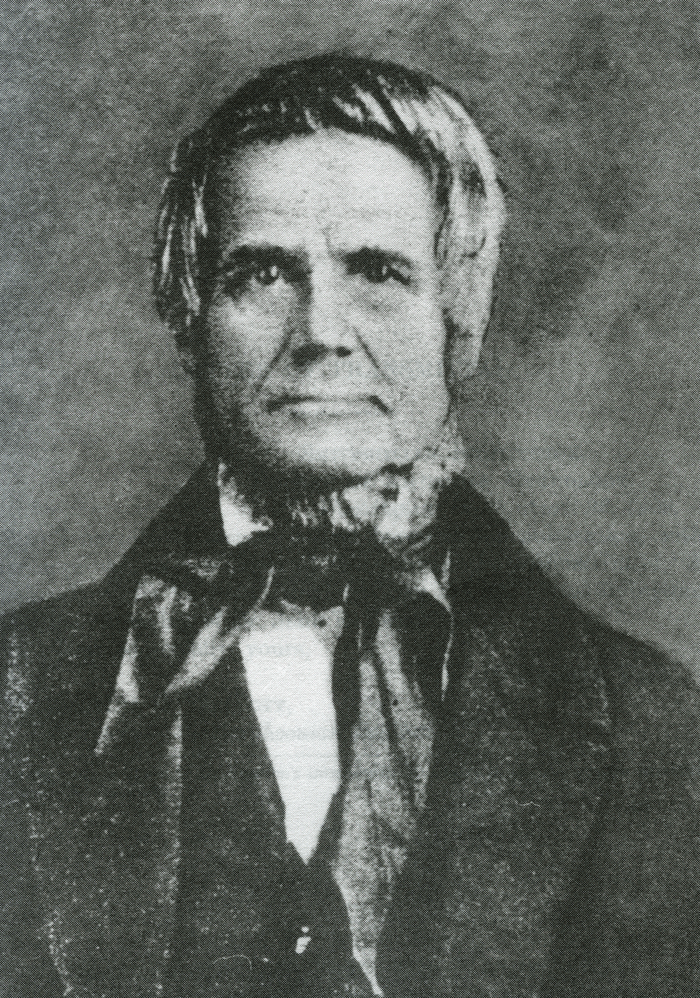
- Born: March 11, 1793
- Died: December 31, 1868 (aged 75)
- Occupations: Minister, linguist
- Employer: American Board of Commissioners for Foreign Missions
- Spouse: Sophia Nye (m. 1827)
- Children: 3

Cyrus Byington (March 11, 1793 – December 31, 1868) was an American Christian missionary from Massachusetts who began working with the Choctaw in Mississippi in 1821. Although he had been trained as a lawyer, he abandoned law as a career and became a minister affiliated with the American Board of Commissioners for Foreign Missions. During this period he learned the Choctaw language, which was then entirely unwritten. He also began to develop a Choctaw orthography.

After the U.S. government began enforcing its Indian Removal policy to relocate Native Americans from their lands in the Southeastern states to Indian Territory, later called Oklahoma, during the 19th century, in 1835, Byington and his family returned to the new Choctaw homeland and founded a mission near Eagletown. (Note: When the Choctaw Nation created administrative subdivision, Eagletown fell in Eagle County, and was designated the capital (equivalent to the county seat). It remained an important town until the Choctaw Nation was dissolved at the time Oklahoma became a state and new counties replaced the Choctaw subdivisions. Thereafter, Eagletown was included in McCurtain County, Oklahoma, and lost its former status as a county seat.) He sought to construct a lexicon and develop other linguistic tools for the Choctaw language to translate Christian prayers, hymns, and bible passages. Byington's work is considered one of the most complete lexicons for a Native American language. He worked nearly 50 years translating Choctaw as a written language.

== Family ==
Cyrus met Sophia Nye (1800–1880), the daughter of a prosperous family living in Marietta, Ohio, in October 1827. Less than a week after their meeting, he proposed marriage to her (which she apparently did not accept immediately), then left for a preaching tour. During their separation, he wrote passionate letters to her, asking her again to marry him and accompany him back to Mississippi, where he served as a minister to the Choctaws. The letters were obviously persuasive, for the couple married in December 1827 and set off on their lifelong partnership shortly afterward.

The Byington family was very susceptible to local illnesses during the early part of their tenure at Eagletown. Cyrus and his wife both fell critically ill several times. Cyrus's sister joined the mission in 1839, but died of illness a few weeks later. Their elder son died in 1840, at the age of eleven, while their younger son died in 1846 at the age of two and a half.

== Career ==
Cyrus Byington spent much of his adult life at Eagletown. Like many of his fellow missionaries, he worried over conflicting loyalties between his church superiors, who were adamantly opposed to slavery, and his Choctaw followers, whose families were slave owners. Arguments over slavery intensified throughout the 1850s. Sponsors of the missions, such as the ABCFM, demanded that their missionaries speak out against slavery. However, the government of the Choctaw Nation threatened to expel any who did so. When the missionaries declared they would remain, the sponsors cut off financial support. Byington reportedly said this experience was "like death." Byington defiantly stayed at his post. He published his Choctaw Definer, made up of English words and Choctaw equivalents, in 1852 but his Grammar and Dictionary were not printed until after his death. Meanwhile he continued his normal missionary duties and medical work. Byington expected to continue working at the mission after the end of the Civil War. However, he became so seriously ill, that people at the mission feared he was about to die. His sole surviving son, Cyrus N., brought a carriage and drove him to Little Rock, 200 miles (320 km) away, so that he could travel by steamboat, where he could stay with his now-married daughter. He caught smallpox during the trip and had to be quarantined for a month after arriving in Ohio. His wife, who had remained in charge of the Eagleton mission while awaiting the arrival of a new missionary, finally rejoined Cyrus in the spring of 1867.

== Death and legacy ==
Somehow, Byington completed his translation of the first five books of the Bible into Choctaw and personally delivered them to the printer in New York City. He returned to Ohio in the spring of 1868, and resumed work on the 7th edition of his Choctaw Grammar. He was still working on this when he died on December 31, 1868. The grammar book could not be published until 1871, but handwritten copies were made by others for missionaries to use in the meanwhile.

== Byington's linguistic work ==
The Choctaw language is a member of the Muskogean family and was well known among the frontiersmen, such as US President Andrew Jackson and William Henry Harrison. The language is closely related to Chickasaw; some linguists consider the two varieties a single language. The following table is an example of Choctaw text and its translation:

Chata Anumpa: Hattak yuka keyu hokυtto yakohmit itibachυfat hieli kυt, nan isht imaiυlhpiesa atokmυt itilawashke; yohmi ha hattak nana hohkia, keyukmυt kanohmi hohkia okla moma nana isht aim aiυlhpiesa, micha isht aimaiυlhtoba he aima ka kanohmi bano hosh isht ik imaiυlhpieso kashke. Amba moma kυt nana isht imachukma chi ho tuksυli hokmakashke.

English Language: That all free men, when they form a special compact, are equal in rights, and that no man or set of men are entitled to exclusive, separate public emolument or privileges from the community, but in consideration of public services.

=== Orthography ===
The written Choctaw language is based upon English version of the Roman alphabet and was developed in conjunction with the civilization program of the United States in the early 19th century. Byington's alphabet and a version modified by John Swanton is seen here.

==== Byington (Original) ====
The Choctaw "Speller" alphabet as found in the Chahta Holisso Ai Isht Ia Vmmona, 1800s.

==== Byington/Swanton (Linguistic) ====
The Choctaw linguistic alphabet as found in the Choctaw Language Dictionary by Cyrus Byington and modified by John Swanton, 1909.

== Works ==
- English and Choctaw Definer (Holisso Anumpa Tosholi), 1852
- Grammar of the Choctaw Language, 1870
- "A dictionary of the Choctaw language" (Choctaw/English and English/Choctaw), 1915

== See also ==
- Timothy H. Ball
- William Bartram
- Horatio B. Cushman
- Angie Debo
- Frances Densmore
- Albert Gatschet
- Henry S. Halbert
- Gideon Lincecum
- John R. Swanton
