= Yoshio Kono =

Japanese wrestler

Personal information
- Nationality: Japanese
- Born: c.1909

Sport
- Sport: Wrestling

Yoshio Kono (河野 芳男, Kōno Yoshio) (born c.1909) was a Japanese wrestler. He competed in the men's freestyle welterweight at the 1932 Summer Olympics.
