= Daniel MacDonald (wrestler) =

Canadian wrestler (1908–1979)

Personal information
- Born: October 9, 1908 Toronto, Ontario, Canada
- Died: October 10, 1979 (aged 71) Toronto, Ontario, Canada

Professional wrestling career
- Sport: Amateur wrestling
- Event: Freestyle
- Billed weight: 87 kg (192 lb)
Medal record
Men's freestyle wrestling
Representing Canada
Olympic Games
Silver medal – second place	1932 Los Angeles	Welterweight

Daniel McDonald (October 9, 1908 – October 10, 1979) was a Canadian wrestler. He was born in Toronto, Ontario in 1908. McDonald was as Olympic silver medalist in freestyle wrestling in 1932, and also competed at the 1928 Olympics.
