= Horatio B. Cushman =

American historian

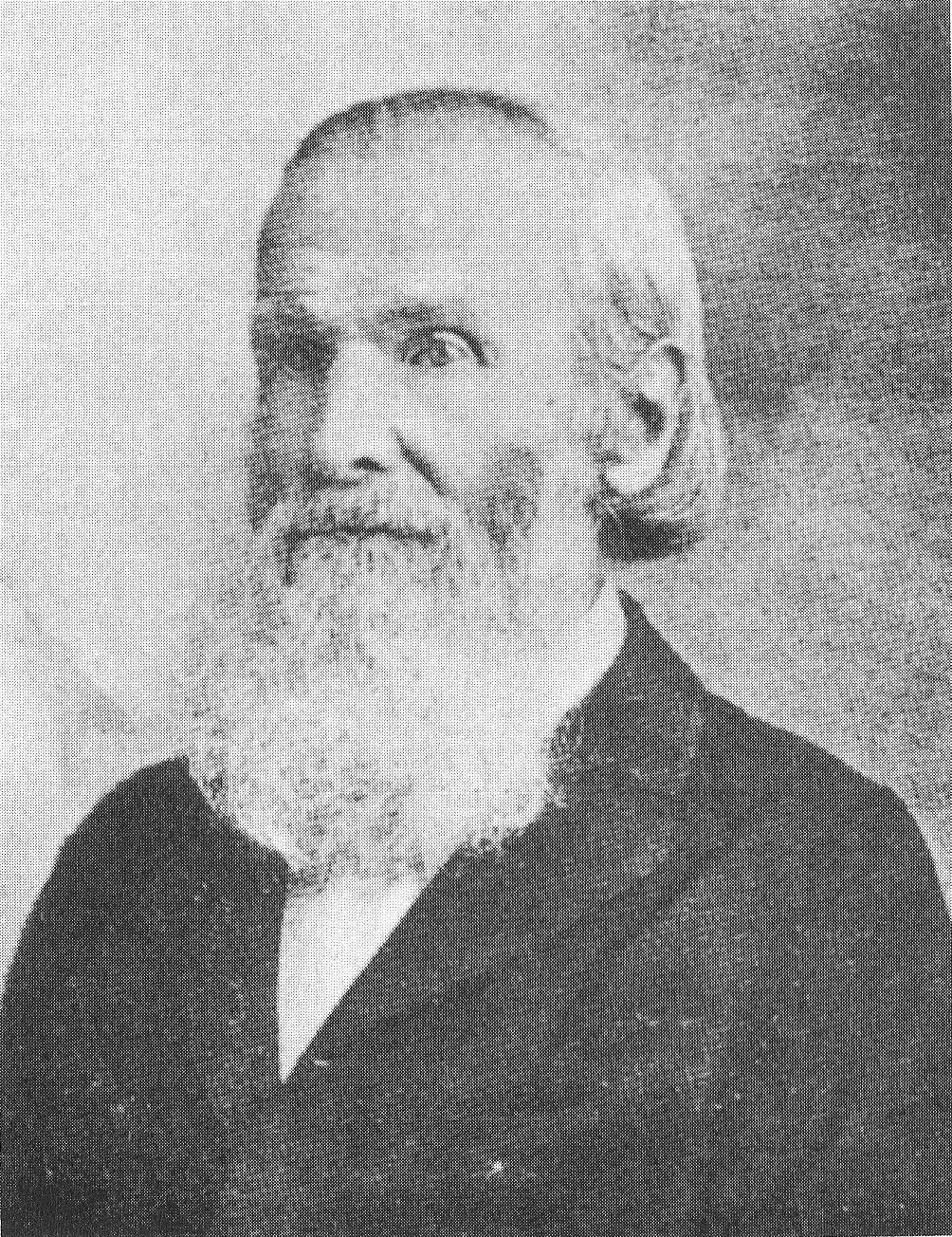
- Born: August 13, 1820; Oktibbeha County, Mississippi, United States
- Died: October 18, 1904 (aged 84); Greenville, Texas, United States
- Occupation: historian
- Writing career
- Notable works: History of the Choctaw, Chickasaw, and Natchez Indians.

Horatio Bardwell Cushman (August 13, 1820 – October 18, 1904) was an American historian. He is known for writing a History of the Choctaw, Chickasaw, and Natchez Indians. The book is well known source for Choctaw, Chickasaw, and Natchez Indian history.

== Personal life ==
Cushman was born on August 13, 1820, in Oktibbeha County, Mississippi. He was the son of missionaries who worked at Mayhew, Mississippi. Cushman, as a child, witnessed the Choctaw Indians' removal from 1831 to 1833. During the American Civil War, Cushman served as a private in the 43rd Mississippi Infantry. After the War in 1868, Cushman moved to Texas near the Red River where the Choctaw Nation was found. In 1884, Cushman began writing his Choctaw and Chickasaw history. He spent six years researching for the book. It was first printed in 1899. He died on October 18, 1904, and was buried in Greenville, Texas.

== Works ==
- 1899. History of the Choctaw, Chickasaw, and Natchez Indians. Norman: University of Oklahoma.

== See also ==
- Timothy H. Ball
- William Bartram
- Daniel Boone
- Cyrus Byington
- Angie Debo
- Henry S. Halbert
- Gideon Lincecum
- John R. Swanton
