= Henry S. Halbert =

American historian (1837–1916)

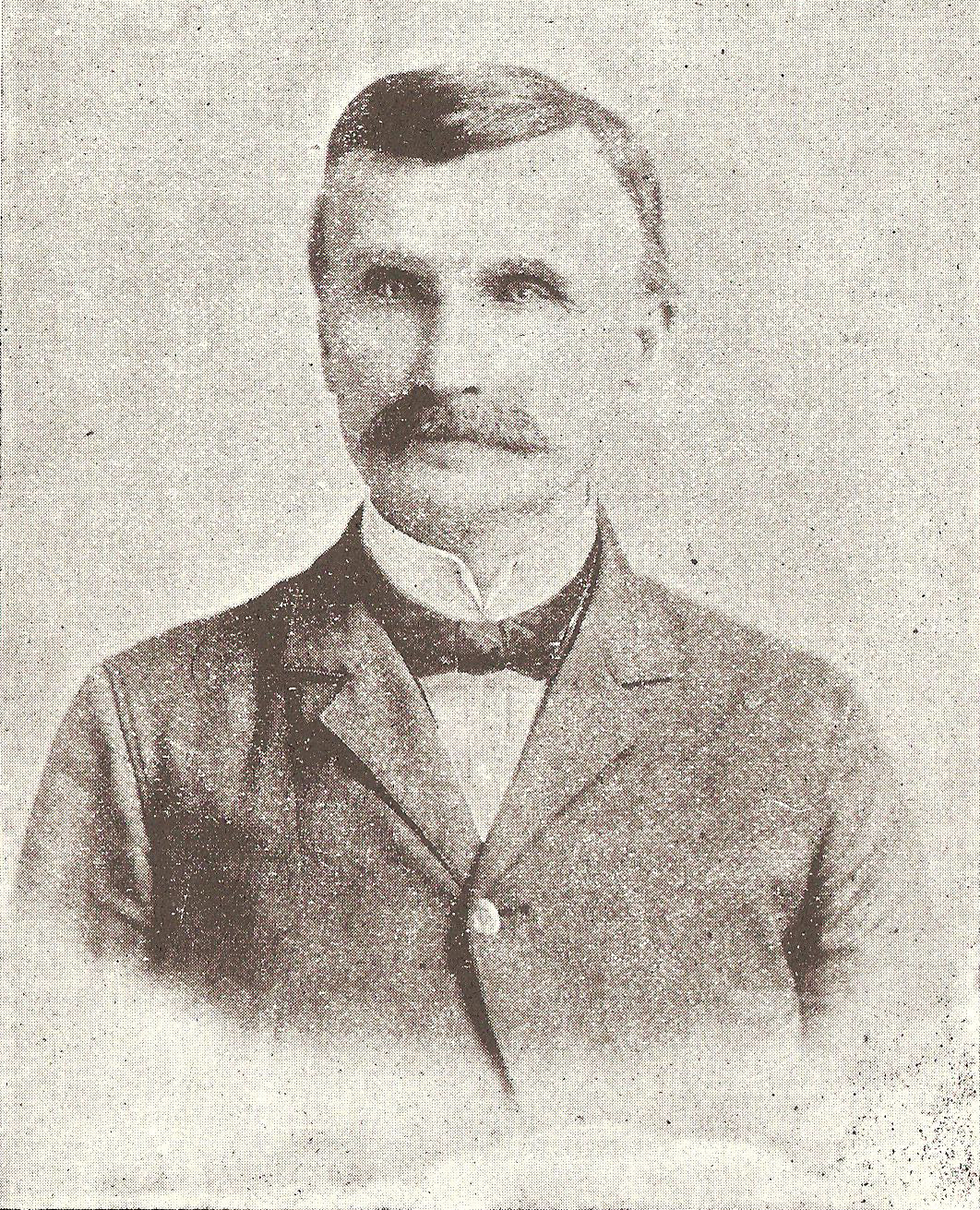
- Born: January 14, 1837; Pickens County, Alabama, U.S.
- Died: May 9, 1916 (aged 79); Montgomery, Alabama, U.S.
- Occupation: historian
- Spouse: Never married
- Writing career
- Notable works: The Creek War of 1813 and 1814

Henry Sale Halbert (January 14, 1837 – May 9, 1916) was an American historian. He is known for writing The Creek War of 1813 and 1814. The book is a well known source for Choctaw and Creek Indian history.

== Personal life ==
Halbert was born in Pickens County, Alabama, and was raised in Lowndes County, Mississippi. In 1857, Halbert earned an M.A. from Tennessee's Union University. He served with the Texas State troops in 1860. Most of his Texas military action was against Indians. When the American Civil War began, Halbert enrolled with the 6th Texas Cavalry Regiment, Confederate Army. He was wounded at New Hope, Georgia in 1864.

From 1866 to 1872, Halbert taught at Waco University in Texas. He also taught at other academic institutions in Texas, Mississippi, and Alabama. From 1884 to 1899, Halbert was involved with the Mississippi Choctaws. Halbert became acquainted with the Indian's knowledge during his time among the Choctaws. Much of this information formed the bases of his works and helped him become an authority on the Choctaw and Creek Indians.

In 1904, he began to work at the Alabama Department of Archives and History. He was the author of numerous publications for the American Antiquarian, The American Anthropologist, and many others. He was co-editor of a dictionary of the Choctaw language.

Halbert died of tuberculosis on May 9, 1916. He was buried in Montgomery, Alabama.

== Works ==
- 1895. The Creek War of 1813 and 1814. Chicago, Illinois: Donohue & Henneberry; Montgomery, Alabama: White, Woodruff, & Fowler. Co-written with Timothy H. Ball.

== See also ==
- Timothy H. Ball
- William Bartram
- Cyrus Byington
- Horatio B. Cushman
- Angie Debo
- Gideon Lincecum
- John R. Swanton
