= Methodist Church of Marshall =

Historic church in Oklahoma, United States

- U.S. National Register of Historic Places
- Location within Oklahoma Location within the United States
- Location: Off OK 74, Marshall, Oklahoma
- Coordinates: 36°9′17″N 97°37′22″W
- Area: less than one acre
- Built: 1898; 128 years ago
- Architectural style: Carpenter Gothic
- MPS: Territorial Era Carpenter Gothic Churches TR
- NRHP reference No.: 84003143
- Added to NRHP: September 28, 1984

The Methodist Church of Marshall is a historic church off OK 74 in Marshall, Oklahoma. It was added to the National Register in 1984.

The congregation was organized in 1895. Its building was constructed in 1898. The church was moved in 1902, along with many other buildings of the town, about .75 miles (1.21 km) to be near the new Santa Fe Railroad depot.
