= Shuichi Yoshida (wrestler) =

Japanese wrestler

Personal information
- Nationality: Japanese
- Born: c.1906 Hyōgo Prefecture, Japan

Sport
- Sport: Wrestling

Shuichi Yoshida (吉田 四一, Yoshida Shūichi) (born c.1906) was a Japanese wrestler. He competed in the men's Greco-Roman welterweight at the 1932 Summer Olympics.
