= Longpoint, Texas =

Ghost town in Texas, US

- Unincorporated community
- Location within Texas
- Coordinates: 30°14′12″N 96°31′41″W
- Country: United States
- State: Texas
- County: Washington
- Elevation: 456 ft (139 m)
- Time zone: UTC-6 (Central (CST))
  - Summer (DST): UTC-5 (CDT)
- Area code: 979
- GNIS feature ID: 1378608

Longpoint is an unincorporated community in Washington County, Texas, United States. According to the Handbook of Texas, the community had a population of 80 in 2000. It is located within the Greater Houston metropolitan area.

== Education ==
Longpoint had its own school in 1882. Today, the community is served by the Brenham Independent School District.
