= Alfred Maasik =

Estonian athlete

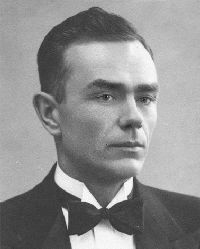

Personal information
- Born: 26 January 1897 Tallinn, Estonia
- Died: 6 July 1990 (aged 93) St. Petersburg, Florida, U.S.
- Height: 165 cm (5 ft 5 in)
- Weight: 66 kg (146 lb)

Sport
- Sport: Athletics
- Event: Race walking
- Club: Estonian Athletic Club, USA

Achievements and titles
- Personal best: 50 kmW – 6:19:00 (1932)

Alfred Alexander Maasik (26 January 1897 – 6 July 1990) was an Estonian race walker and long-distance runner.

== Biography ==
Maasik took up sports in 1912 and had his first major competitions ten years later. From 1926 to 1934 he lived between Estonia and United States, competing in cross-country, 10,000 m and marathon running events. In 1930 he finished second in the New York City Marathon with a time of 2:40:01. Shortly before the 1932 Summer Olympics he was approached by Estonian officials, who could not afford to send a team to Los Angeles and were looking for Estonians residing in the United States. Only Osvald Käpp and Maasik agreed to compete on a short notice, with Maasik placing tenth in the 50 km walk. After 1934 he permanently stayed in the United States. He died at St. Anthony's Hospital in St. Petersburg, Florida in 1990.
