= Raúl López (wrestler) =

Mexican wrestler

Personal information
- Nationality: Mexican

Sport
- Sport: Wrestling

Raúl López was a Mexican wrestler. He competed in the men's freestyle welterweight at the 1932 Summer Olympics.
