= Väinö Kajander =

Finnish wrestler (1893–1978)

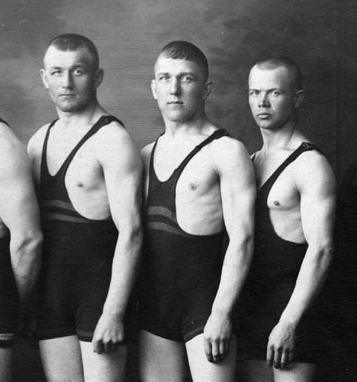
- Kajander (left) in 1921

Personal information
- Born: 30 November 1893 Elimäki, Finland
- Died: 16 September 1978 (aged 84) Helsinki, Finland

Sport
- Sport: Greco-Roman wrestling
- Club: Helsingin Jyry
Medal record
Men's Greco-Roman wrestling
Representing Finland
Olympic Games
Silver medal – second place	1932 Los Angeles	Welterweight

Väinö Viktor Kajander (later Kajukorpi, 30 November 1893 – 16 September 1978) was a welterweight Greco-Roman wrestler from Finland who won a silver medal at the 1932 Olympics. Kajander was a machinist by profession. He retired from wrestling in 1936, aged 43.
