= Eitaro Suzuki =

Japanese wrestler (1899 – 1979)

Personal information
- Nationality: Japanese
- Born: 20 April 1899 Shizuoka, Japanese Empire
- Died: May 1979 (aged 80) Japan

Sport
- Sport: Wrestling

Eitaro Suzuki (鈴木 英太郎, Suzuki Eitarō) (20 April 1899 – May 1979) was a Japanese wrestler. He competed in the men's freestyle lightweight at the 1932 Summer Olympics.
