= Gideon Lincecum =

American historian (1793–1874)

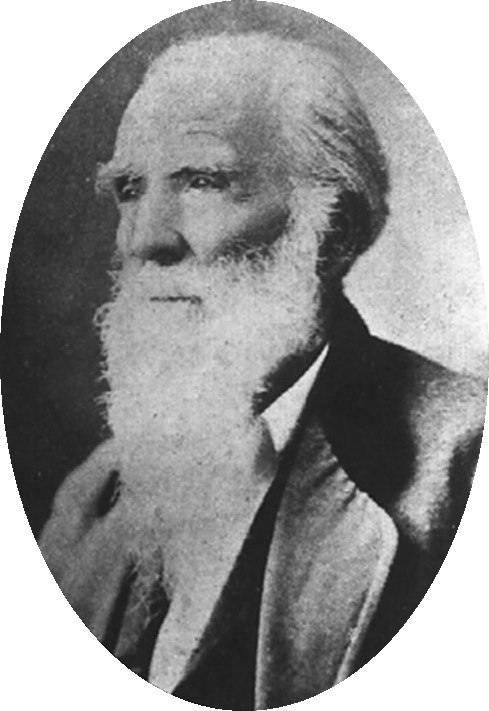
- Born: April 22, 1793; Warren County, Georgia, U.S.A.
- Died: November 28, 1874 (aged 81); Longpoint, Texas
- Occupations: historian, naturalist
- Writing career
- Notable works: Traditional History of the Chahta Nation, Translated from the Chahta

Gideon Lincecum (22 April 1793 – 28 November 1874) was an American pioneer, historian, medical doctor, philosopher, and naturalist. Lincecum is known for his exploration and settlement of what are now the U.S. states of Alabama, Mississippi, and Texas, which was then beyond the western borders of the Thirteen Colonies. Lincecum had good relations with Native Americans as he explored the wilderness in the American South. He was the son of Hezekiah and Sally (Hickman) Lincecum and was born in Warren County, Georgia, on April 22, 1793. Lincecum was self-educated. He spent his boyhood principally in the company of Muskogees. After successive moves, he and his wife, the former Sarah Bryan, moved in 1818 with his parents and siblings to the Tombigbee River, above the site of present Columbus, Mississippi.

While living among the Choctaw in Mississippi, he recorded their legends and traditions in the Choctaw language. After moving to Texas, he translated it to English as the Chahta Tradition.

He sought a new frontier in 1868 and, at the age of seventy-six, with a widowed daughter and her seven children, joined a Confederate colony in Tuxpan, Veracruz, Mexico. He died on November 28, 1874, after a long illness at his Longpoint, Texas, home.

== Historian ==
Lincecum had contact with Chickasaw, Creek (Muscogee), and Choctaw peoples before the Indian removals of the 1830s began. He learned how to speak and write their languages, learned about their medicine, and recorded their history. Lincecum frequently visited an elderly Choctaw man named Chahta Immataha, who gave him a detailed account of Choctaw's oral history. Historian Patricia Galloway notes that Lincecum's "narrative is not reliable."

I remember now, though the time has long passed, with feelings of unfeigned gratitude the many kindnesses bestowed on me and my little family in 1818 and 1819 when we were in their neighborhood before the country began to fill up with other white people ... . We met often, hunted together, fished together, swam together, and they were positively and I have no hesitation in declaring it here, the most truthful, most reliable and best people I have ever dealt with. ... The time is long gone, and I may never have the pleasure of meeting with any of that most excellent race of people again. But so long as the life pendulum swings in this old time-shattered bosom, I shall remember their many kindnesses to me and mine, with sentiments of kindest affection and deepest gratitude.

— - Gideon Lincecum, 1831 - Gideon Lincecum (1793–1874): Mississippi Pioneer and Man of Many Talents

== Naturalist ==
Lincecum was a self-taught naturalist. Lincecum would spend "countless hours observing birds, insects, weather, rocks, and plants. He regularly corresponded with like-minded individuals, including Charles Darwin on two occasions. He published numerous articles in scholarly scientific journals and came to be recognized as a thorough and respectable researcher, despite his lack of formal education."

== Works ==
- “Autobiography of Gideon Lincecum”, Publications of the Mississippi Historical Society. 8 (1905), 443–519.
- “Choctaw Traditions about Their Settlement in Mississippi and the Origin of Their Mounds.”Publications of the Mississippi Historical Society. 8 (1904), 521-542.
- “Life of Apushimataha.” Publications of the Mississippi Historical Society. 9 (1906), 415–485.
- "Pushmataha: A Choctaw Leader and His People." Tuscaloosa, Alabama: University of Alabama Press, 2004.
- Science on the Texas Frontier: Observations of Dr. Gideon Lincecum, Edited by Jerry Bryan Lincecum, Edward Hake Phillips, and Peggy A. Redshaw. College Station, Texas: Texas A&M University Press, 1997.
- Traditional History of the Chahta Nation, Translated from the Chahta, Eugene C. Barker Texas History Center, University of Texas, 1861.

== See also ==
- William Bartram
- Daniel Boone
- Cyrus Byington
- Horatio B. Cushman
- Henry S. Halbert
- John R. Swanton
