= Melvin Clodfelter =

American wrestler (1904–1983)

Personal information
- Full name: Melvin Carl Clodfelter
- Born: June 26, 1904 Marshall, Oklahoma, U.S.
- Died: January 19, 1983 (aged 78) Oklahoma City, Oklahoma, U.S.

Sport
- Country: United States
- Sport: Wrestling
- Events: Freestyle and Folkstyle
- College team: Oklahoma A&M
- Team: USA
- Coached by: Edward C. Gallagher
Medal record
Collegiate Wrestling
Representing Oklahoma A&M
NCAA Championships
Gold medal – first place	1928 Ames	145 lb

Melvin Carl Clodfelter (June 26, 1904 – January 19, 1983) was an American wrestler. He competed in the men's freestyle lightweight at the 1932 Summer Olympics. He also won an NCAA wrestling championship at Oklahoma A&M.
