= Gyula Zombori =

Hungarian wrestler

Personal information
- Nationality: Hungarian
- Born: 20 July 1902; Szenta, Austria-Hungary
- Died: 8 May 1946 (aged 43)

Sport
- Sport: Wrestling

Gyula Zombori (20 July 1902 – 8 May 1946) was a Hungarian wrestler. He competed in two events at the 1932 Summer Olympics.
