= Gustaf Klarén =

Swedish wrestler (1906–1984)

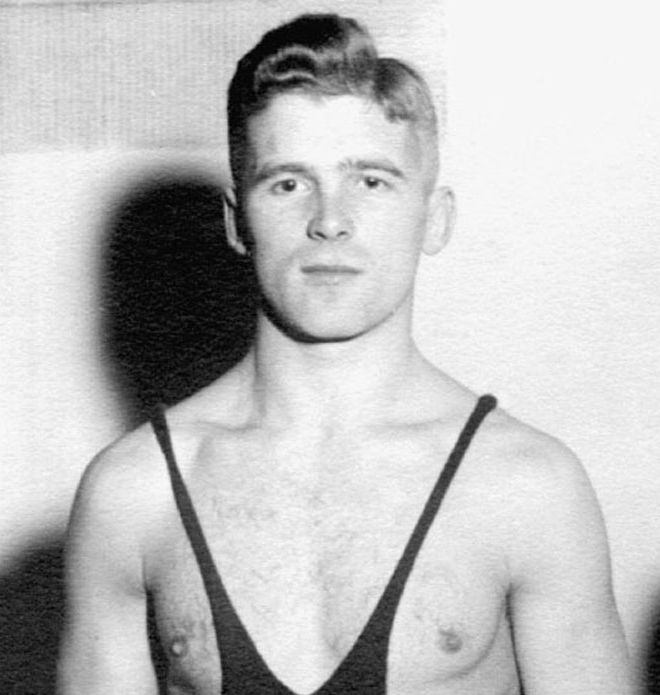

Personal information
- Born: 30 March 1906 Fritsla, Sweden
- Died: 27 September 1984 (aged 78) Borås, Sweden

Sport
- Sport: Freestyle wrestling
- Club: GAK Enighet, Malmö; Eslövs AIF; BK Viking, Broby
Medal record
Men's freestyle wrestling
Representing Sweden
Olympic Games
Bronze medal – third place	1932 Los Angeles	Lightweight

Gustaf Vilhelm Klarén (30 March 1906 – 27 September 1984) was a Swedish freestyle wrestler who won a bronze medal in the lightweight division at the 1932 Summer Olympics. He initially could not afford traveling to the Olympics, but the inhabitants of Borås helped him by raising money. He later owned and ran a cigar store in Borås.
