= Børge Jensen =

Danish wrestler (1911–1967)

Personal information
- Nationality: Danish
- Born: 18 June 1911; Aalborg, Denmark
- Died: 12 January 1967 (aged 55)

Sport
- Sport: Wrestling

Børge Jensen (18 June 1911 – 12 January 1967) was a Danish wrestler. He competed in two events at the 1932 Summer Olympics.
