= Osvald Käpp =

Estonian wrestler (1905–1995)

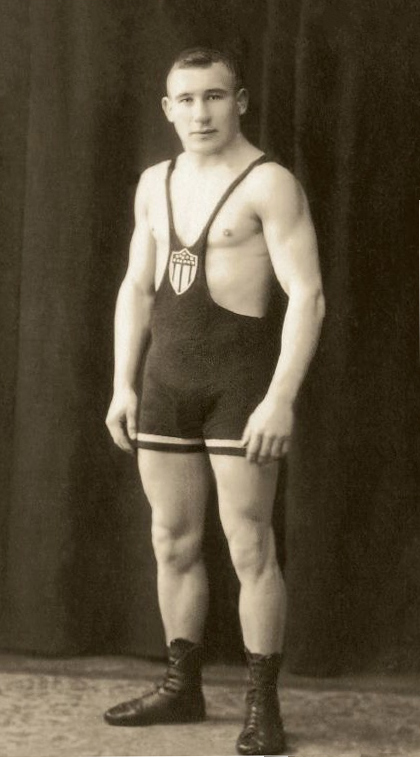

Personal information
- Born: 17 February 1905 Tallinn, Governorate of Estonia, Russian Empire
- Died: 22 December 1995 (aged 90) New York, New York, U.S.
- Height: 173 cm (5 ft 8 in)

Sport
- Sport: Wrestling
- Club: Kalev Tallinn
Medal record
Men's freestyle wrestling
Representing Estonia
Olympic Games
Gold medal – first place	1928 Amsterdam	66 kg
Men's Greco-Roman wrestling
European Championships
Silver medal – second place	1926 Riga	67.5 kg
Bronze medal – third place	1927 Budapest	67.5 kg

Osvald Käpp (17 February 1905 – 22 December 1995) was an Estonian wrestler who competed in freestyle and Greco-Roman lightweight events at the 1924, 1928 and 1932 Summer Olympics. He won the freestyle contest in 1928 and served as the Olympic flag bearer for Estonia in 1932. He also won two medals in Greco-Roman wrestling at the European championships in 1926–27.

Käpp trained as a gymnast and basketball player before changing to wrestling in 1923. In 1929, during the Great Depression, he immigrated to New York City, and won the AAU Greco-Roman (1929) and freestyle titles (1930–31). He retired in 1931, but was convinced to compete in the 1932 Summer Olympics, as Estonia could not afford to send an Olympic team to Los Angeles and was recruiting Estonians living in the United States (only Käpp and Alfred Maasik agreed). Lack of preparation took its toll, and Käpp was eliminated after three rounds in both freestyle and Greco-Roman wrestling.

Käpp was a pastry-chef. While living in Tallinn, he worked at a candy factory and later opened a bakery in New York.
