= List of 1932 Summer Olympics medal winners =

The 1932 Summer Olympics, referred to by the International Olympic Committee as the Games of the X Olympiad, were held in Los Angeles, California, United States, from July 30 through August 14, 1932.

A total of individual athletes won medals. Athletes from the United States were the most successful, winning 103 medals during the games, 41 of which were gold. Italy and Finland, won the second and third most medals, with 36 and 25 respectively. France finished third in the gold medal count (behind Italy and the United States) having achieved 10 golds in their haul of 19 medals.

Medals were awarded in a total of 116 events across 16 sports. In addition, American football and lacrosse were held as demonstration events.

== Athletics ==
Event	Gold	Silver	Bronze
Men's 100m	Eddie Tolan; United States	Ralph Metcalfe; United States	Arthur Jonath; Germany
Men's 200m	Eddie Tolan; United States	George Simpson; United States	Ralph Metcalfe; United States
Men's 400m	Bill Carr; United States	Ben Eastman; United States	Alex Wilson; Canada
Men's 800m	Tommy Hampson; Great Britain	Alex Wilson; Canada	Phil Edwards; Canada
Men's 1500m	Luigi Beccali; Italy	Jerry Cornes; Great Britain	Phil Edwards; Canada
Men's 5000m	Lauri Lehtinen; Finland	Ralph Hill; United States	Lauri Virtanen; Finland
Men's 10000m	Janusz Kusociński; Poland	Volmari Iso-Hollo; Finland	Lauri Virtanen; Finland
Men's 110m hurdles	George Saling; United States	Percy Beard; United States	Donald Finlay; Great Britain
Men's 400m hurdles	Bob Tisdall; Ireland	Glenn Hardin; United States	Morgan Taylor; United States
Men's 3000m steeplechase	Volmari Iso-Hollo; Finland	Thomas Evenson; Great Britain	Joe McCluskey; United States
Men's 4 × 100 m relay	United States; Bob Kiesel; Hector Dyer; Emmett Toppino; Frank Wykoff	Germany; Friedrich Hendrix; Erich Borchmeyer; Arthur Jonath; Helmut Körnig	Italy; Giuseppe Castelli; Gabriele Salviati; Ruggero Maregatti; Edgardo Toetti
Men's 4 × 400 m relay	United States; Ivan Fuqua; Ed Ablowich; Karl Warner; Bill Carr	Great Britain; Crew Stoneley; Tommy Hampson; David Burghley; Godfrey Rampling	Canada; James Ball; Ray Lewis; Phil Edwards; Alex Wilson
Men's 50 km walk	Tommy Green; Great Britain	Jānis Daliņš; Latvia	Ugo Frigerio; Italy
Men's marathon	Juan Carlos Zabala; Argentina	Sam Ferris; Great Britain	Armas Toivonen; Finland
Men's long jump	Ed Gordon; United States	Lambert Redd; United States	Chuhei Nambu; Japan
Men's triple jump	Chuhei Nambu; Japan	Erik Svensson; Sweden	Kenkichi Oshima; Japan
Men's high jump	Duncan McNaughton; Canada	Bob Van Osdel; United States	Simeon Toribio; Philippines
Men's pole vault	Bill Miller; United States	Shuhei Nishida; Japan	George Jefferson; United States
Men's shot put	Leo Sexton; United States	Harlow Rothert; United States	František Douda; Czechoslovakia
Men's discus throw	John Anderson; United States	Henri LaBorde; United States	Paul Winter; France
Men's hammer throw	Pat O'Callaghan; Ireland	Ville Pörhölä; Finland	Peter Zaremba; United States
Men's javelin throw	Matti Järvinen; Finland	Matti Sippala; Finland	Eino Penttilä; Finland
Men's decathlon	James Bausch; United States	Akilles Järvinen; Finland	Wolrad Eberle; Germany
Women's 100m	Stanisława Walasiewicz; Poland	Hilda Strike; Canada	Wilhelmina von Bremen; United States
Women's 4 × 100 m relay	United States; Mary Carew; Evelyn Furtsch; Annette Rogers; Wilhelmina von Bremen	Canada; Mary Frizzell; Mildred Fizzell; Lillian Palmer; Hilda Strike	Great Britain; Nellie Halstead; Eileen Hiscock; Gwendoline Porter; Violet Webb
Women's 80m hurdles	Babe Didrikson; United States	Evelyne Hall; United States	Marjorie Clark; South Africa
Women's high jump	Jean Shiley; United States	Babe Didrikson; United States	Eva Dawes; Canada
Women's discus throw	Lillian Copeland; United States	Ruth Osburn; United States	Jadwiga Wajs; Poland
Women's javelin throw	Babe Didrikson; United States	Ellen Braumüller; Germany	Tilly Fleischer; Germany

== Boxing ==
Event	Gold	Silver	Bronze
Flyweight (-50.8 kg / 112 lb)	István Énekes; Hungary	Francisco Cabañas; Mexico	Louis Salica; United States
Bantamweight (-53.5 kg / 118 lb)	Horace Gwynne; Canada	Hans Ziglarski; Germany	José Villanueva; Philippines
Featherweight (-57.2 kg / 126 lb)	Carmelo Robledo; Argentina	Josef Schleinkofer; Germany	Allan Carlsson; Sweden
Lightweight (-61.2 kg / 135 lb)	Lawrence Stevens; South Africa	Thure Ahlqvist; Sweden	Nathan Bor; United States
Welterweight (-66.7 kg / 147 lb)	Edward Flynn; United States	Erich Campe; Germany	Bruno Ahlberg; Finland
Middleweight (-72.6 kg / 160 lb)	Carmen Barth; United States	Amado Azar; Argentina	Ernest Peirce; South Africa
Light heavyweight (-79.4 kg / 175 lb)	David Carstens; South Africa	Gino Rossi; Italy	Peter Jørgensen; Denmark
Heavyweight (over 79.4 kg/175 lb)	Santiago Lovell; Argentina	Luigi Rovati; Italy	Frederick Feary; United States

== Cycling ==
Event	Gold	Silver	Bronze
Individual time trial	Attilio Pavesi; Italy	Guglielmo Segato; Italy	Bernhard Britz; Sweden
Team time trial	Italy; Giuseppe Olmo; Attilio Pavesi; Guglielmo Segato	Denmark; Henry; Leo Nielsen; Frode Sørensen	Sweden; Arne Berg; Bernhard Britz; Sven Höglund
1000m time trial	Dunc Gray; Australia	Jacobus van Egmond; Netherlands	Charles Rampelberg; France
Sprint	Jacobus van Egmond; Netherlands	Louis Chaillot; France	Bruno Pellizzari; Italy
Tandem	France; Louis Chaillot; Maurice Perrin	Great Britain; Ernest Chambers; Stanley Chambers	Denmark; Harald Christensen; Willy Gervin
Team pursuit	Italy; Paolo Pedretti; Nino Borsari; Marco Cimatti; Alberto Ghilardi	France; Henri Mouillefarine; Paul Chocque; Amédée Fournier; René Legrèves	Great Britain; Frank Southall; William Harvell; Charles Holland; Ernest Johnson

== Diving ==
Men

Event	Gold	Silver	Bronze
3 metre springboard	Michael Galitzen; United States	Harold Smith; United States	Richard Degener; United States
10 metre platform	Harold Smith; United States	Michael Galitzen; United States	Frank Kurtz; United States

Women

Event	Gold	Silver	Bronze
3 metre springboard	Georgia Coleman; United States	Katherine Rawls; United States	Jane Fauntz; United States
10 metre platform	Dorothy Poynton; United States	Georgia Coleman; United States	Marion Roper; United States

== Equestrian ==
Event	Gold	Silver	Bronze
Individual dressage	Xavier Lesage and Taine; France	Charles Marion and Linon; France	Hiram Tuttle and Olympic; United States
Team dressage	France; Xavier Lesage and Taine; Charles Marion and Linon; André Jousseaume and Sorelta	Sweden; Bertil Sandström and Kreta; Thomas Byström and Gulliver; Gustaf Adolf Boltenstern, Jr. and Ingo	United States; Hiram Tuttle and Olympic; Isaac Kitts and American Lady; Alvin Moore and Water Pat
Individual eventing	Charles Pahud de Mortanges and Ferdinand; Netherlands	Earl Foster Thomson and Jenny Camp; United States	Clarence von Rosen, Jr. and Sunnyside Maid; Sweden
Team eventing	United States; Earl Foster Thomson and Jenny Camp; Harry Chamberlin and Pleasant Smiles; Edwin Argo and Honolulu Tomboy	Netherlands; Charles Pahud de Mortanges and Marcroix; Karel Schummelketel and Duiveltje; Aernout van Lennep and Henk	No Bronze awarded
Individual jumping	Takeichi Nishi and Uranus; Japan	Harry Chamberlin and Show Girl; United States	Clarence von Rosen, Jr. and Empire; Sweden

- Note:The scheduled team jumping event was declared void as no nation completed the course with three riders

== Fencing ==
Event	Gold	Silver	Bronze
Men's épée	Giancarlo Cornaggia Medici; Italy	Georges Buchard; France	Carlo Agostoni; Italy
Men's team épée	France; Fernand Jourdant; Bernard Schmetz; Georges Tainturier; Georges Buchard; Jean Piot; Philippe Cattiau	Italy; Saverio Ragno; Giancarlo Cornaggia Medici; Franco Riccardi; Carlo Agostoni; Renzo Minoli	United States; George Charles Calnan; Gustave Marinius Heiss; Frank Stahl Jr. Righeimer; Tracy Jaeckel; Curtis Charles Shears; Miguel Angel De Capriles
Men's foil	Gustavo Marzi; Italy	Joseph L. Levis; United States	Giulio Gaudini; Italy
Men's team foil	France; Edward Gardère; René Bondoux; René Bougnol; René Lemoine; Philippe Cattiau; Jean Piot	Italy; Giulio Gaudini; Gustavo Marzi; Ugo Pignotti; Gioachino Guaragna; Rodolfo Terlizzi; Giorgio Pessina	United States; George Charles Calnan; Richard Clarke Steere; Joseph L. Levis; Dernell Every; Hugh Vincent Alessandroni; Frank Stahl Jr. Righeimer
Men's sabre	György Piller; Hungary	Giulio Gaudini; Italy	Endre Kabos; Hungary
Men's team sabre	Hungary; Endre Kabos; Attila Petschauer; Ernő Nagy; Gyula Glykais; György Piller; Aladár Gerevich	Italy; Gustavo Marzi; Giulio Gaudini; Renato Anselmi; Emilio Salafia; Arturo De Vecchi; Ugo Pignotti	Poland; Tadeusz Friedrich; Marian Suski; Władysław Dobrowolski; Władysław Segda; Leszek Lubicz; Adam Papée
Women's foil	Ellen Preis; Austria	Judy Guinness; Great Britain	Erna Bogen; Hungary

== Field hockey ==
Event	Gold	Silver	Bronze
Men's tournament	India; Richard Allen; Muhammad Aslam; Lal Bokhari; Frank Brewin; Richard Carr; Dhyan Chand; Leslie Hammond; Arthur Hind; Sayed Jaffar; Masud Minhas; Broome Pinniger; Gurmit Singh Kullar; Roop Singh; William Sullivan; Carlyle Tapsell	Japan; Shunkichi Hamada; Junzo Inohara; Sadayoshi Kobayashi; Haruhiko Kon; Kenichi Konishi; Hiroshi Nagata; Eiichi Nakamura; Yoshio Sakai; Katsumi Shibata; Akio Sohda; Toshio Usami	United States; William Boddington; Harold Brewster; Roy Coffin; Amos Deacon; Horace Disston; Samuel Ewing; James Gentle; Henry Greer; Lawrence Knapp; David McMullin; Leonard O'Brien; Charles Sheaffer; Frederick Wolters

== Gymnastics ==
Event	Gold	Silver	Bronze
All-Around, Individual	Romeo Neri; Italy	István Pelle; Hungary	Heikki Savolainen; Finland
All-Around, Team	Italy; Oreste Capuzzo; Savino Guglielmetti; Mario Lertora; Romeo Neri; Franco Tognini	United States; Frank Haubold; Frank Cumiskey; Al Jochim; Fred Meyer; Michael Schuler	Finland; Mauri Nyberg-Noroma; Ilmari Pakarinen; Heikki Savolainen; Einari Teräsvirta; Martti Uosikkinen
Floor	István Pelle; Hungary	Georges Miez; Switzerland	Mario Lertora; Italy
Horizontal bar	Dallas Bixler; United States	Heikki Savolainen; Finland	Einari Teräsvirta; Finland
Indian clubs	George Roth; United States	Philip Erenberg; United States	William Kuhlemeier; United States
Parallel bars	Romeo Neri; Italy	István Pelle; Hungary	Heikki Savolainen; Finland
Pommel horse	István Pelle; Hungary	Omero Bonoli; Italy	Frank Haubold; United States
Rings	George Gulack; United States	Bill Denton; United States	Giovanni Lattuada; Italy
Rope climbing	Raymond Bass; United States	William Galbraith; United States	Thomas F. Connolly; United States
Tumbling	Rowland Wolfe; United States	Ed Gross; United States	William Herrmann; United States
Vault	Savino Guglielmetti; Italy	Al Jochim; United States	Ed Carmichael; United States

== Modern pentathlon ==
Event	Gold	Silver	Bronze
Men's	Johan Gabriel Oxenstierna; Sweden	Bo Lindman; Sweden	Richard Mayo; United States

== Rowing ==
Event	Gold	Silver	Bronze
single sculls	Bobby Pearce; Australia	William Miller; United States	Guillermo Douglas; Uruguay
double sculls	United States; Ken Myers; William Gilmore	Germany; Herbert Buhtz; Gerhard Boetzelen	Canada; Charles Pratt; Noël de Mille
coxless pairs	Great Britain; Lewis Clive; Hugh Edwards	New Zealand; Cyril Stiles; Rangi Thompson	Poland; Henryk Budziński; Jan Mikołajczak
coxed pairs	United States; Joseph Schauers; Charles Kieffer; Edward Jennings	Poland; Jerzy Braun; Janusz Ślązak; Jerzy Skolimowski	France; Anselme Brusa; André Giriat; Pierre Brunet
coxless four	Great Britain; John Badcock; Hugh Edwards; Jack Beresford; Rowland George	Germany; Karl Aletter; Ernst Gaber; Walter Flinsch; Hans Maier	Italy; Antonio Ghiardello; Francesco Cossu; Giliante D'Este; Antonio Garzoni Provenzani
coxed four	Germany; Hans Eller; Horst Hoeck; Walter Meyer; Joachim Spremberg; Carlheinz Neumann	Italy; Bruno Vattovaz; Giovanni Plazzer; Riccardo Divora; Bruno Parovel; Guerrino Scher	Poland; Jerzy Braun; Janusz Ślązak; Stanisław Urban; Edward Kobyliński; Jerzy Skolimowski
eight	United States; Edwin Salisbury; James Blair; Duncan Gregg; David Dunlap; Burton Jastram; Charles Chandler; Harold Tower; Winslow Hall; Norris Graham	Italy; Vittorio Cioni; Mario Balleri; Renato Bracci; Dino Barsotti; Roberto Vestrini; Guglielmo Del Bimbo; Enrico Garzelli; Renato Barbieri; Cesare Milani	Canada; Earl Eastwood; Joseph Harris; Stanley Stanyar; Harry Fry; Cedric Liddell; William Thoburn; Don Boal; Albert Taylor; Les MacDonald

== Sailing ==
Event	Gold	Silver	Bronze
Snowbird	Jacques Lebrun; France	Bob Maas; Netherlands	Santiago Amat; Spain
Star	United States; Jupiter; Gilbert Gray; Andrew Libano	Great Britain; Joy; George Colin Ratsey; Peter Jaffe	Sweden; Swedisk Star; Gunnar Asther; Daniel Sundén-Cullberg
6 metre	Sweden; Bissbi; Tore Holm; Martin Hindorff; Olle Åkerlund; Åke Bergqvist	United States; Gallant; Robert Carlson; Temple Ashbrook; Frederic Conant; Charles Smith; Donald Wills Douglas, Jr. Emmett Davis	Canada; Caprice; Philip Rogers; Gerald Wilson; Gardner Boultbee; Kenneth Glass
8 metre	United States; Angelita; John Biby; William Cooper; Carl Dorsey; Owen Churchill; Robert Sutton; Pierpont Davis; Alan Morgan; Alphonse Burnand; Thomas Webster; John Huettner; Richard Moore; Kenneth Carey	Canada; Santa Maria; Ernest Cribb; Harry Jones; Peter Gordon; Hubert Wallace; Ronald Maitland; George Gyles	none awarded

== Shooting ==
Event	Gold	Silver	Bronze
25 metre rapid fire pistol	Renzo Morigi; Italy	Heinz Hax; Germany	Domenico Matteucci; Italy
50 metre rifle prone	Bertil Rönnmark; Sweden	Gustavo Huet; Mexico	Zoltán Soós-Hradetzky; Hungary

== Swimming ==
Men

Event	Gold	Silver	Bronze
100 m freestyle	Yasuji Miyazaki; Japan	Tatsugo Kawaishi; Japan	Albert Schwartz; United States
400 m freestyle	Buster Crabbe; United States	Jean Taris; France	Tsutomu Ōyokota; Japan
1500 m freestyle	Kusuo Kitamura; Japan	Shozo Makino; Japan	Jim Cristy; United States
100 m backstroke	Masaji Kiyokawa; Japan	Toshio Irie; Japan	Kentaro Kawatsu; Japan
200 m breaststroke	Yoshiyuki Tsuruta; Japan	Reizo Koike; Japan	Teófilo Yldefonso; Philippines
4 × 200 m freestyle relay	Japan; Yasuji Miyazaki; Hisakichi Toyoda; Takashi Yokoyama; Masanori Yusa	United States; Frank Booth; George Fissler; Maiola Kalili; Manuella Kalili	Hungary; István Bárány; László Szabados; András Székely; András Wanié

Women

Event	Gold	Silver	Bronze
100 m freestyle	Helene Madison; United States	Willy den Ouden; Netherlands	Eleanor Saville; United States
400 m freestyle	Helene Madison; United States	Lenore Kight; United States	Jenny Maakal; South Africa
100 m backstroke	Eleanor Holm; United States	Bonnie Mealing; Australia	Valerie Davies; Great Britain
200 m breaststroke	Clare Dennis; Australia	Hideko Maehata; Japan	Else Jacobsen; Denmark
4 × 100 m freestyle relay	United States; Helen Johns; Helene Madison; Josephine McKim; Eleanor Saville	Netherlands; Corrie Laddé; Willy den Ouden; Puck Oversloot; Maria Vierdag	Great Britain; Joyce Cooper; Valerie Davies; Edna Hughes; Helen Varcoe

== Water polo ==
Event	Gold	Silver	Bronze
Men's tournament	Hungary; István Barta; György Bródy; Olivér Halassy; Márton Homonnai; Sándor Ivády; Alajos Keserű; Ferenc Keserű; János Németh; Miklós Sárkány; József Vértesy	Germany; Emil Benecke; Otto Cordes; Hans Eckstein; Fritz Gunst; Erich Rademacher; Joachim Rademacher; Hans Schulze; Heiko Schwartz	United States; Austin Clapp; Philip Daubenspeck; Charles Finn; Charles McCallister; Wally O'Connor; Cal Strong; Herbert Wildman

== Weightlifting ==
Event	Gold	Silver	Bronze
Featherweight –60 kg	Raymond Suvigny; France	Hans Wölpert; Germany	Anthony Terlazzo; United States
Lightweight –67.5 kg	René Duverger; France	Hans Haas; Austria	Gastone Pierini; Italy
Middleweight –75 kg	Rudolf Ismayr; Germany	Carlo Galimberti; Italy	Karl Hipfinger; Austria
Light-heavyweight –82.5 kg	Louis Hostin; France	Svend Olsen; Denmark	Henry Duey; United States
Heavyweight +82.5 kg	Jaroslav Skobla; Czechoslovakia	Václav Pšenička; Czechoslovakia	Josef Straßberger; Germany

== Wrestling ==
=== Greco-Roman ===
Event	Gold	Silver	Bronze
Bantamweight (- 56 kg)	Jakob Brendel; Germany	Marcello Nizzola; Italy	Louis François; France
Featherweight (- 61 kg)	Giovanni Gozzi; Italy	Wolfgang Ehrl; Germany	Lauri Koskela; Finland
Lightweight (- 66 kg)	Eric Malmberg; Sweden	Abraham Kurland; Denmark	Eduard Sperling; Germany
Welterweight (- 72 kg)	Ivar Johansson; Sweden	Väinö Kajander; Finland	Ercole Gallegati; Italy
Middleweight (- 79 kg)	Väinö Kokkinen; Finland	Jean Földeák; Germany	Axel Cadier; Sweden
Light Heavyweight (- 87 kg)	Rudolf Svensson; Sweden	Onni Pellinen; Finland	Mario Gruppioni; Italy
Heavyweight (+ 87 kg)	Carl Westergren; Sweden	Josef Urban; Czechoslovakia	Nikolaus Hirschl; Austria

=== Freestyle ===
Event	Gold	Silver	Bronze
Bantamweight (- 56 kg)	Robert Pearce; United States	Ödön Zombori; Hungary	Aatos Jaskari; Finland
Featherweight (- 61 kg)	Hermanni Pihlajamäki; Finland	Edgar Nemir; United States	Einar Karlsson; Sweden
Lightweight (- 66 kg)	Charles Pacôme; France	Károly Kárpáti; Hungary	Gustaf Klarén; Sweden
Welterweight (- 72 kg)	Jack van Bebber; United States	Daniel MacDonald; Canada	Eino Leino; Finland
Middleweight (- 79 kg)	Ivar Johansson; Sweden	Kyösti Luukko; Finland	József Tunyogi; Hungary
Light Heavyweight (- 87 kg)	Peter Mehringer; United States	Thure Sjöstedt; Sweden	Eddie Scarf; Australia
Heavyweight (+ 87 kg)	Johan Richthoff; Sweden	Jack Riley; United States	Nikolaus Hirschl; Austria

== Statistics ==
=== Medal leaders ===
Athletes who won multiple medals during the 1932 Winter Olympics are listed below.

Athlete	Nation	Sport	Gold	Silver	Bronze	Total

== See also ==
- 1932 Summer Olympics medal table
