= Rowing at the 1932 Summer Olympics =

Rowing at the Games of the X Olympiad
- Venue: Long Beach Marine Stadium
- Dates: August 9–13, 1932
- Competitors: 152 from 13 nations

Rowing at the 1932 Summer Olympics featured seven events. The competitions were held from August 9 to August 13 at the Marine Stadium in Long Beach, California.

== Medal summary ==
Event	Gold	Silver	Bronze
single sculls	Bobby Pearce; Australia	William Miller; United States	Guillermo Douglas; Uruguay
double sculls	Ken Myers and William Gilmore; United States	Herbert Buhtz and Gerhard Boetzelen; Germany	Charles Pratt and Noël de Mille; Canada
coxless pair	Lewis Clive and Hugh Edwards; Great Britain	Cyril Stiles and Rangi Thompson; New Zealand	Henryk Budziński and Jan Mikołajczak; Poland
coxed pair	United States; Joseph Schauers; Charles Kieffer; Edward Jennings	Poland; Jerzy Braun; Janusz Ślązak; Jerzy Skolimowski	France; Anselme Brusa; André Giriat; Pierre Brunet
coxless four	Great Britain; John Badcock; Hugh Edwards; Jack Beresford; Rowland George	Germany; Karl Aletter; Ernst Gaber; Walter Flinsch; Hans Maier	Italy; Antonio Ghiardello; Francesco Cossu; Giliante D'Este; Antonio Garzoni Provenzani
coxed four	Germany; Hans Eller; Horst Hoeck; Walter Meyer; Joachim Spremberg; Carlheinz Neumann	Italy; Bruno Vattovaz; Giovanni Plazzer; Riccardo Divora; Bruno Parovel; Guerrino Scher	Poland; Jerzy Braun; Janusz Ślązak; Stanisław Urban; Edward Kobyliński; Jerzy Skolimowski
eight	United States; Edwin Salisbury; James Blair; Duncan Gregg; David Dunlap; Burton Jastram; Charles Chandler; Harold Tower; Winslow Hall; Norris Graham	Italy; Vittorio Cioni; Mario Balleri; Renato Bracci; Dino Barsotti; Roberto Vestrini; Guglielmo Del Bimbo; Enrico Garzelli; Renato Barbieri; Cesare Milani	Canada; Earl Eastwood; Joseph Harris; Stanley Stanyar; Harry Fry; Cedric Liddell; William Thoburn; Don Boal; Albert Taylor; Les MacDonald

== Participating nations ==
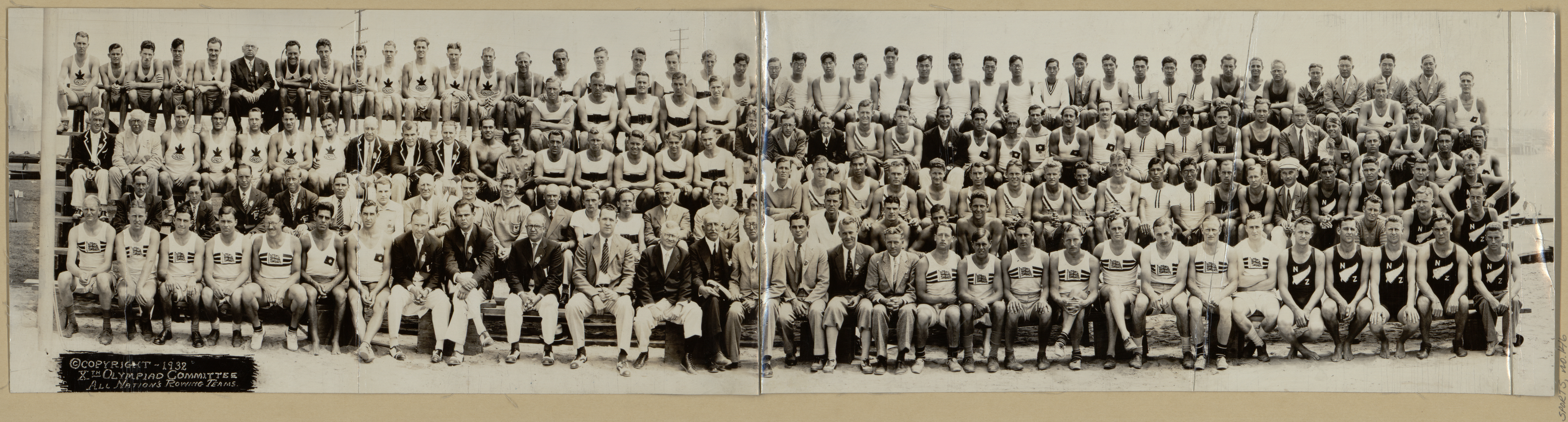
A group photo of all rowing teams competing at the 1932 Summer Olympics.

A total of 152 rowers from 13 nations competed at the Los Angeles Games:

- Australia (1)
- Brazil (18)
- Canada (16)
- France (5)
- Germany (16)
- Great Britain (15)
- Italy (20)
- Japan (14)
- Netherlands (2)
- New Zealand (11)
- Poland (7)
- United States (26)
- Uruguay (1)

== Medal table ==
Rank	Nation	Gold	Silver	Bronze	Total
1	United States	3	1	0	4
2	Great Britain	2	0	0	2
3	Germany	1	2	0	3
4	Australia	1	0	0	1
5	Italy	0	2	1	3
6	Poland	0	1	2	3
7	New Zealand	0	1	0	1
8	Canada	0	0	2	2
9	France	0	0	1	1
9	Uruguay	0	0	1	1
Totals (10 entries)		7	7	7	21
