= Italy at the 1932 Summer Olympics =

- IOC code: ITA
- NOC: Italian National Olympic Committee

in Los Angeles
- Competitors: 112 (all men) in 13 sports
- Flag bearer: Ugo Frigerio
- Medals Ranked 2nd: Gold 12 Silver 12 Bronze 12 Total 36

Summer Olympics appearances (overview)
- 1896; 1900; 1904; 1908; 1912; 1920; 1924; 1928; 1932; 1936; 1948; 1952; 1956; 1960; 1964; 1968; 1972; 1976; 1980; 1984; 1988; 1992; 1996; 2000; 2004; 2008; 2012; 2016; 2020; 2024

Other related appearances
- 1906 Intercalated Games

Italy competed at the 1932 Summer Olympics in Los Angeles, United States. It was their eighth time participating at the Summer Olympics. 112 competitors, all men, took part in 61 events in 13 sports.

== Medalists ==
Medal	Name	Sport	Event	Date
Gold	Luigi Beccali	Athletics	Men's 1500 m	August 4
Gold	Attilio Pavesi	Cycling	Men's individual road race	August 4
Gold	Giuseppe Olmo, Attilio Pavesi, Guglielmo Segato	Cycling	Men's team road race	August 4
Gold	Nino Borsari, Marco Cimatti, Alberto Ghilardi, Paolo Pedretti	Cycling	Men's team pursuit	August 2
Gold	Giancarlo Cornaggia-Medici	Fencing	Men's épée	August 9
Gold	Gustavo Marzi	Fencing	Men's foil	August 4
Gold	Romeo Neri	Gymnastics	Men's individual all-around	August 10
Gold	Romeo Neri	Gymnastics	Men's parallel bars	August 12
Gold	Oreste Capuzzo, Savino Guglielmetti, Mario Lertora, Romeo Neri, Franco Tognini	Gymnastics	Men's team all-around	August 10
Gold	Savino Guglielmetti	Gymnastics	Men's vault	August 10
Gold	Renzo Morigi	Shooting	Men's 25 m rapid fire pistol	August 12
Gold	Giovanni Gozzi	Wrestling	Men's Greco-Roman featherweight	August 7
Silver	Gino Rossi	Boxing	Men's light heavyweight	August 13
Silver	Luigi Rovati	Boxing	Men's heavyweight	August 13
Silver	Guglielmo Segato	Cycling	Men's individual road race	August 4
Silver	Carlo Agostoni, Giancarlo Cornaggia-Medici, Renzo Minoli, Saverio Ragno, Franco Riccardi	Fencing	Men's team épée	August 7
Silver	Giulio Gaudini, Gioacchino Guaragna, Gustavo Marzi, Giorgio Pessina, Ugo Pignotti, Rodolfo Terlizzi	Fencing	Men's team foil	August 1
Silver	Giulio Gaudini	Fencing	Men's sabre	August 13
Silver	Renato Anselmi, Arturo De Vecchi, Giulio Gaudini, Gustavo Marzi, Ugo Pignotti, Emilio Salafia	Fencing	Men's team sabre	August 11
Silver	Omero Bonoli	Gymnastics	Men's pommel horse	August 11
Silver	Riccardo Divora, Bruno Parovel, Giovanni Plazzer, Guerrino Scher, Bruno Vattovaz	Rowing	Men's coxed four	August 13
Silver	Mario Balleri, Renato Barbieri, Dino Barsotti, Renato Bracci, Vittorio Cioni, Guglielmo Del Bimbo, Enrico Garzelli, Cesare Milani, Roberto Vestrini	Rowing	Men's eight	August 13
Silver	Carlo Galimberti	Weightlifting	Men's 75 kg	July 31
Silver	Marcello Nizzola	Wrestling	Men's Greco-Roman bantamweight	August 7
Bronze	Giuseppe Castelli, Ruggero Maregatti, Gabriele Salviati, Edgardo Toetti	Athletics	Men's 4 × 100 m relay	August 7
Bronze	Ugo Frigerio	Athletics	Men's 50 km walk	August 3
Bronze	Bruno Pellizzari	Cycling	Men's sprint	August 3
Bronze	Carlo Agostoni	Fencing	Men's épée	August 9
Bronze	Giulio Gaudini	Fencing	Men's foil	August 4
Bronze	Mario Lertora	Gymnastics	Men's floor	August 8
Bronze	Giovanni Lattuada	Gymnastics	Men's rings	August 12
Bronze	Francesco Cossu, Giliante D'Este, Antonio Garzoni Provenzani, Antonio Ghiardello	Rowing	Men's coxless four	August 13
Bronze	Domenico Matteucci	Shooting	Men's 25 m rapid fire pistol	August 12
Bronze	Gastone Pierini	Weightlifting	Men's 67.5 kg	July 30
Bronze	Ercole Gallegati	Wrestling	Men's Greco-Roman welterweight	August 7
Bronze	Mario Gruppioni	Wrestling	Men's Greco-Roman light heavyweight	August 7

== Athletics ==
=== Results ===
Men (21)
Athlete	Age	Event	Rank	Medal
Luigi Facelli	34	Men's 400 metres Hurdles	5	
Luigi Beccali	24	Men's 1,500 metres	1	Gold
Alfredo Furia	26	Men's 3,000 metres Steeplechase	6 h2 r1/2	
Giuseppe Lippi	28	Men's 3,000 metres Steeplechase	7	
Nello Bartolini	28	Men's 3,000 metres Steeplechase	10	
Edgardo Toetti	22	Men's 4 × 100 metres Relay	3	Bronze
Gabriele Salviati	22	Men's 4 × 100 metres Relay	3	Bronze
Giuseppe Castelli	24	Men's 4 × 100 metres Relay	3	Bronze
Ruggero Maregatti	27	Men's 4 × 100 metres Relay	3	Bronze
Giacomo Carlini	27	Men's 4 × 400 metres Relay	6	
Giovanni Turba	26	Men's 4 × 400 metres Relay	6	
Luigi Facelli	34	Men's 4 × 400 metres Relay	6	
Mario De Negri	30	Men's 4 × 400 metres Relay	6	
Ettore Rivolta	27	Men's 50 kilometres Walk	5	
Francesco Pretti	28	Men's 50 kilometres Walk	AC	
Ugo Frigerio	30	Men's 50 kilometres Walk	3	Bronze
Francesco Roccati	24	Men's Marathon	AC	
Michele Fanelli	24	Men's Marathon	13	
Armando Poggioli	44	Men's Hammer Throw	8	
Fernando Vandelli	25	Men's Hammer Throw	9	
Angelo Tommasi	20	Men's High Jump	9T	
Francesco Tabai	24	Men's Triple Jump	10	

== Cycling ==
Ten cyclists, all men, represented Italy in 1932.

Individual road race

- Attilio Pavesi
- Guglielmo Segato
- Giuseppe Olmo
- Giovanni Cazzulani

Team road race

- Attilio Pavesi
- Guglielmo Segato
- Giuseppe Olmo

Sprint

- Bruno Pellizzari

Time trial

- Luigi Consonni

Team pursuit

- Marco Cimatti
- Paolo Pedretti
- Alberto Ghilardi
- Nino Borsari

== Fencing ==
14 fencers, all men, represented Italy in 1932.

Men's foil

- Gustavo Marzi
- Giulio Gaudini
- Gioacchino Guaragna

Men's team foil

- Giulio Gaudini, Gioacchino Guaragna, Gustavo Marzi, Ugo Pignotti, Rodolfo Terlizzi, Giorgio Pessina

Men's épée

- Giancarlo Cornaggia-Medici
- Carlo Agostoni
- Saverio Ragno

Men's team épée

- Carlo Agostoni, Franco Riccardi, Renzo Minoli, Saverio Ragno, Giancarlo Cornaggia-Medici

Men's sabre

- Giulio Gaudini
- Arturo De Vecchi
- Emilio Salafia

Men's team sabre

- Gustavo Marzi, Giulio Gaudini, Renato Anselmi, Emilio Salafia, Arturo De Vecchi, Ugo Pignotti

== Modern pentathlon ==
Three male pentathletes represented Italy in 1932.

- Carlo Simonetti
- Eugenio Pagnini
- Francesco Pacini

== Shooting ==
Six shooters represented Italy in 1932, winning a gold and bronze medal in the 25 m pistol event.

25 m rapid fire pistol

- Renzo Morigi
- Domenico Matteucci
- Walter Boninsegni

50 m rifle, prone

- Mario Zorzi
- Ugo Cantelli
- Amedeo Bruni

== Swimming ==
Men

Athlete	Event	Heat		Semifinal		Final	
Athlete	Event	Time	Rank	Time	Rank	Time	Rank
Paolo Costoli	400 m freestyle	5:06.7	9 Q	5:06.0	9	Did not advance	
Giuseppe Perentin	400 m freestyle	5:09.1	10 Q	5:10.5	10	Did not advance	
Paolo Costoli	1500 m freestyle	20:48.1	10 Q	20:58.7	10	Did not advance	
Giuseppe Perentin	1500 m freestyle	21:04.5	11	Did not advance			
