= Japan at the 1932 Summer Olympics =

- IOC code: JPN
- NOC: Japanese Olympic Committee

in Los Angeles
- Competitors: 157
- Flag bearer: Mikio Oda
- Medals Ranked 5th: Gold 7 Silver 7 Bronze 4 Total 18

Summer Olympics appearances (overview)
- 1912; 1920; 1924; 1928; 1932; 1936; 1948; 1952; 1956; 1960; 1964; 1968; 1972; 1976; 1980; 1984; 1988; 1992; 1996; 2000; 2004; 2008; 2012; 2016; 2020; 2024

The Empire of Japan competed at the 1932 Summer Olympics in Los Angeles, California. 131 athletes competed in 10 sports and also participated in art competitions.

Swimming became the most successful sport after collecting five gold medals, five silver medals and also two bronze medals. Takeichi Nishi also performed stunningly in equestrian and won Japan's first gold medal in the sport. The field hockey team also competed with two other teams from the United States and India, and won a silver medal.

With so many teams, Japan's delegation was the second largest, exceeded only by the United States.

== Medalists ==
Medal	Name	Sport	Event	Date
Gold	Chuhei Nambu	Athletics	Men's triple jump	August 4
Gold	Yasuji Miyazaki	Swimming	Men's 100 m freestyle	August 7
Gold	Yasuji Miyazaki; Masanori Yusa; Takashi Yokoyama; Hisakichi Toyoda	Swimming	Men's 4 × 200 m freestyle relay	August 9
Gold	Masaji Kiyokawa	Swimming	Men's 100 m backstroke	August 12
Gold	Yoshiyuki Tsuruta	Swimming	Men's 200 m breaststroke	August 13
Gold	Kusuo Kitamura	Swimming	Men's 1500 m freestyle	August 13
Gold	Takeichi Nishi	Equestrian	Individual jumping	August 14
Silver	Shuhei Nishida	Athletics	Men's pole vault	August 3
Silver	Tatsugo Kawaishi	Swimming	Men's 100 m freestyle	August 7
Silver	Hideko Maehata	Swimming	Women's 200 m breaststroke	August 9
Silver	Shunkichi Hamada; Junzo Inohara; Sadayoshi Kobayashi; Haruhiko Kon; Kenichi Konishi; Hiroshi Nagata; Eiichi Nakamura; Yoshio Sakai; Katsumi Shibata; Toshio Usami	Field hockey	Tournaments	August 11
Silver	Toshio Irie	Swimming	Men's 100 m backstroke	August 12
Silver	Reizo Koike	Swimming	Men's 200 m breaststroke	August 13
Silver	Shozo Makino	Swimming	Men's 1500 m freestyle	August 13
Bronze	Chuhei Nambu	Athletics	Men's long jump	August 2
Bronze	Kenkichi Oshima	Athletics	Men's triple jump	August 4
Bronze	Tsutomu Ōyokota	Swimming	Men's 400 m freestyle	August 10
Bronze	Kentaro Kawatsu	Swimming	Men's 100 m backstroke	August 12

Medals by sport
Sport	1st place, gold medalist(s)	2nd place, silver medalist(s)	3rd place, bronze medalist(s)	Total
Swimming	5	5	2	12
Athletics	1	1	2	4
Equestrian	1	0	0	1
Field hockey	0	1	0	1
Total	7	7	4	18

== Aquatics ==
=== Swimming ===
Men

Athlete	Event	Heat		Semifinal		Final	
Athlete	Event	Time	Rank	Time	Rank	Time	Rank
Tatsugo Kawaishi	100 m freestyle	59.8	6 q	59.0	2 Q	58.6	2nd place, silver medalist(s)
Yasuji Miyazaki	100 m freestyle	58.7	1 Q	58.0 OR	1 Q	58.2	1st place, gold medalist(s)
Zenjiro Takahashi	100 m freestyle	59.5	3 Q	59.5	7 Q	59.2	5
Tsutomu Ōyokota	400 m freestyle	5:06.3	8 Q	4:52.8	4 Q	4:52.3	3rd place, bronze medalist(s)
Noboru Sugimoto	400 m freestyle	5:00.2	6 Q	4:59.0	6 Q	4:56.1	5
Takashi Yokoyama	400 m freestyle	4:53.2 OR	1 Q	4:51.4 OR	1 Q	4:52.5	4
Sunao Ishiharada	1500 m freestyle	20:09.5	7 Q	20:31.2	9	Did not advance	
Kusuo Kitamura	1500 m freestyle	19:55.2	2 Q	19:51.6 OR	2 Q	19:12.4 OR	1st place, gold medalist(s)
Shozo Makino	1500 m freestyle	19:53.3	1 Q	19:38.7 OR	1 Q	19:14.1	2nd place, silver medalist(s)
Toshio Irie	100 m backstroke	1:11.3	5 Q	1:10.9	4 Q	1:09.8	2nd place, silver medalist(s)
Kentaro Kawatsu	100 m backstroke	1:10.9	4 q	1:10.2	3 Q	1:10.0	3rd place, bronze medalist(s)
Masaji Kiyokawa	100 m backstroke	1:08.9	1 Q	1:09.0	1 Q	1:08.6	1st place, gold medalist(s)
Reizo Koike	200 m breaststroke	2:46.2 =OR	=1 Q	2:44.9 OR	1 Q	2:46.6	2nd place, silver medalist(s)
Shigeo Nakagawa	200 m breaststroke	2:55.0	8 Q	2:52.4	7 Q	2:52.8	6
Yoshiyuki Tsuruta	200 m breaststroke	2:46.2 OR	=1 Q	2:45.4	2 Q	2:45.4	1st place, gold medalist(s)
Yasuji Miyazaki; Masanori Yusa; Hisakichi Toyoda; Takashi Yokoyama	4 × 200 metre freestyle relay	—N/a				8:58.4 WR	1st place, gold medalist(s)

Women

Athlete	Event	Heat		Semifinal		Final	
Athlete	Event	Time	Rank	Time	Rank	Time	Rank
Yukie Arata	100 m freestyle	1:16.1	15	Did not advance			
Kazue Kojima	100 m freestyle	1:16.2	16	Did not advance			
Hatsuho Matsuzawa	100 m freestyle	1:17.1	18	Did not advance			
Hatsuko Morioka	400 m freestyle	6:07.4	11	Did not advance			
Misao Yokota	100 m backstroke	—N/a		1:25.1	9	Did not advance	
Hideko Maehata	200 m breaststroke	—N/a		3:10.7	2 Q	3:06.4	2nd place, silver medalist(s)
Kazue Kojima; Hatsuko Morioka; Misao Yokota; Yukie Arata	4 × 100 metre freestyle relay	—N/a				5:06.7 NR	5

=== Diving ===
Men

Athlete	Event	Final	
Athlete	Event	Points	Rank
Kazuo Kobayashi	3 m springboard	133.76	6
Tetsutaro Namae	3 m springboard	125.18	8
Hidekatsu Ishida	10 m platform	75.92	8

Women

Athlete	Event	Final	
Athlete	Event	Points	Rank
Etsuko Kamakura	3 m springboard	60.78	7
Etsuko Kamakura	10 m platform	31.36	6

=== Water polo ===
- 7 August

United States	10 – 0	Japan

- 8 August

Hungary	18 – 0	Japan

- 12 August

Germany	10 – 0	Japan

=== Final standings ===
Pos	Team	Pld	W	D	L	GF	GA	GD	Pts	HUN	GER	USA	JPN
1st place, gold medalist(s)	Hungary	3	3	0	0	31	2	+29	6		6–2	7–0	18–0
2nd place, silver medalist(s)	Germany	3	1	1	1	16	10	+6	3	2–6		4–4	10–0
3rd place, bronze medalist(s)	United States	3	1	1	1	14	11	+3	3	0–7	4–4		10–0
4	Japan	3	0	0	3	0	38	−38	0	0–18	0–10	0–10	

== Field hockey ==
=== Standings ===
Pos	Team	Pld	W	D	L	GF	GA	GD	Pts
1st place, gold medalist(s)	India	2	2	0	0	35	2	+33	2
2nd place, silver medalist(s)	Japan	2	1	0	1	10	13	−3	1
3rd place, bronze medalist(s)	United States (H)	2	0	0	2	3	33	−30	0

Source: Sports Reference
(H) Hosts

=== Matches ===
4 August 1932

India	11–1	Japan
Roop Singh(3); Kullar(3); Carr (1); Chand (4)		Inohara(1)

8 August 1932

Japan	9–2	United States
Inohara(4)

== Rowing ==
Men

Athlete	Event	Heats		Repechage		Final	
Athlete	Event	Time	Rank	Time	Rank	Time	Rank
Rokuro Takahashi; Norio Ban; Umetaro Shibata; Daikichi Suzuki; Shokichi Nanba	Coxed four	7:16.8	3 R	7:47.0	4	Did not advance	6
Yoshio Enomoto; Shigeo Fujiwara; Saburo Hara; Kenzo Ikeda; Setsuo Matsura; Taro Nishidono; Hidemitsu Tanaka; Setsuji Tanaka; Toshi Sano	Eight	6:43.4	3 R	7:22.6	3	Did not advance	7
