= Brazil at the 1932 Summer Olympics =

- IOC code: BRA
- NOC: Brazilian Olympic Committee

in Los Angeles
- Competitors: 67 (66 men, 1 woman) in 6 sports
- Flag bearer: Antônio Lira
- Medals: Gold 0 Silver 0 Bronze 0 Total 0

Summer Olympics appearances (overview)
- 1920; 1924; 1928; 1932; 1936; 1948; 1952; 1956; 1960; 1964; 1968; 1972; 1976; 1980; 1984; 1988; 1992; 1996; 2000; 2004; 2008; 2012; 2016; 2020; 2024; 2028

Brazil competed at the 1932 Summer Olympics in Los Angeles, United States. Brazil returned to the Olympic Games after missing the 1928 Summer Olympics.

== Background ==
As the Great Depression had struck the country, the delegation of 82 athletes travelled in a ship, the Itaquicê, selling coffee along the way to fund the trip. Since the San Pedro authorities charged one dollar for each person who disembarked in the Port of Los Angeles, the organizers only let out of the ship the athletes they felt had a chance to win medals plus swimmer Maria Lenk – the first South American woman to compete in the Olympics – to spend less. Afterwards, the Itaquicê went to San Francisco to sell more coffee, and there the water polo, rowing and athletics competitors got financed.

== Athletics ==
18 men competed. The most notable case was Adalberto Cardoso, who hitched a ride from San Francisco to Los Angeles and only arrived at the Los Angeles Memorial Coliseum ten minutes prior to the 10,000 m race he would run. Cardoso competed barefoot and finished last, but was cheered by the audience and earned a special medal.

| Athlete | Event | Heats | | Quarterfinals | | Semifinals | | Final | |
| Athlete | Event | Result | Rank | Result | Rank | Result | Rank | Result | Rank |
|---|---|---|---|---|---|---|---|---|---|
| José de Almeida | 100 m | 11.0 | 2 | 10.8 | 4 | did not advance | | | |
| Mario Marques | 100 m | 11.5 | 5 | did not advance | | | | | |
| Ricardo Guimarães | 100 m | 11.4 | 4 | did not advance | | | | | |
| Domingos Puglisi | 400 m | 50.8 | 3 | 50.1 | 5 | did not advance | | | |
| Domingos Puglisi | 800 m | N/A | | | | 1:59.4 | 6 | did not advance | |
| Nestor Gomes | 800 m | N/A | | | | 2:00.5 | 5 | did not advance | |
| Nestor Gomes | 1500 m | N/A | | | | DNF | AC | did not advance | |
| Armando Bréa | 1500 m | N/A | | | | DNF | AC | did not advance | |
| Adalberto Cardoso | 10,000m | N/A | | | | | | Unknown | 13th |
| Antônio Giusfredi | 110 m hurdles | N/A | | 15.3 | 5 | did not advance | | | |
| Sylvio Padilha | 110 m hurdles | N/A | | 15.4 | 4 | did not advance | | | |
| Sylvio Padilha | 400 m hurdles | N/A | | 55.1 | 4 | did not advance | | | |
| Carlos dos Reis Filho | 400 m hurdles | N/A | | 55.8 | 4 | did not advance | | | |
| Carlos Woebcken | Decathlon | N/A | | | | | | DNF | AC |
| João Clemente da Silva | Marathon | N/A | | | | | | 3h02:06 | 19th |
| Matheus Marcondes | Marathon | N/A | | | | | | DNF | AC |
| Lúcio de Castro | Pole vault | N/A | | | | | | 3.90 | 6th |
| Carlos Joel Nelli | Pole vault | N/A | | | | | | NH | AC |
| Clóvis Raposo | Long jump | N/A | | | | | | 6.43 | 6th |
| Antônio Lira | Shot put | N/A | | | | | | NM | — |
| Carmine Giorgi | Hammer throw | N/A | | | | | | 36.45 | 13th |
| Heitor Medina | Javelin throw | N/A | | | | | | 58 | 11th |

== Rowing ==
18 men competed in four different boats.

Ranks given are within the heat.

| Rower | Cox | Event | Quarterfinals | | Semifinals | | Final | |
| Rower | Cox | Event | Result | Rank | Result | Rank | Result | Rank |
|---|---|---|---|---|---|---|---|---|
| Estevan Strata; José Ramalho | Francisco de Bricio | Coxed pair | N/A | | | | 8:53.2 | 4th |
| Osório Pereira; Olivério Popovitch; Durval Lima; João Francisco de Castro | Americo Fernandes | Coxed four | 7:29.4 | 4th | did not advance | | | |
| Henrique Tomassini; Adamor Gonçalves | N/A | Double sculls | 7:38.8 | 3 | 7:57.8 | 3 | did not advance | |
| Vasco de Carvalho; Joaquim Faria; Osório Pereira; Cláudionor Provenzano; Antônio Rebello Júnior; Fernando de Abreu; José de Campos; José Mò | Amaro da Cunha | Eight | N/A | | 6:52.4 | 4th | Withdrew | |

== Shooting ==
Six Brazilian shooters competed.

| Shooter | Event | Final | |
| Shooter | Event | Result | Rank |
|---|---|---|---|
| Eugenio do Amaral | 25 metre rapid fire pistol | 17 | 13th |
| Bráz Magaldi | 25 metre rapid fire pistol | 15 | 17th |
| Antônio da Silveira | 25 metre rapid fire pistol | 15 | 17th |
| Manoel Braga | 50 m rifle, prone | 284 | 19th |
| Antônio Guimarães | 50 m rifle, prone | 282 | 20th |
| José Castro | 50 m rifle, prone | 277 | 24th |

== Swimming ==
7 men and one woman competed.

Men

| Swimmer | Event | Quarterfinals | | Semifinals | | Final | |
| Swimmer | Event | Result | Rank | Result | Rank | Result | Rank |
|---|---|---|---|---|---|---|---|
| João Pereira | 100 metres Freestyle | 1:08.2 | 6th | did not advance | | | |
| Manoel Villar | 100 metres Freestyle | 1:08.4 | 6th | did not advance | | | |
| Jorge de Paula | 100 metres Backstroke | 1:29.2 | 3rd | did not advance | | | |
| Benvenuto Nuñes | 100 metres Backstroke | 1:21.0 | 5th | did not advance | | | |
| Harry Forsell | 200 metres Breaststroke | 3:14.6 | 6th | did not advance | | | |
| Manoel Lourenço; Isaac Moraes; Manoel Villar; Benvenuto Nuñes | 4 × 200 metres Freestyle | N/A | | | | 10:36.5 | 7th |

Women

| Swimmer | Event | Quarterfinals | | Semifinals | | Final | |
| Swimmer | Event | Result | Rank | Result | Rank | Result | Rank |
|---|---|---|---|---|---|---|---|
| Maria Lenk | Women's 100 metres Freestyle | 1:25.8 | 5th | did not advance | | | |
| Maria Lenk | Women's 100 metres Backstroke | N/A | | N/A | 4th | did not advance | |
| Maria Lenk | Women's 200 metres Breaststroke | N/A | | 3:26.6 | 4th | did not advance | |

== Water Polo ==
Brazil made its debut at water polo, but the team was disqualified after the players assaulted officials at the end of the match with Germany.

- Brazil vs. Germany: 3:7
- Brazil vs. United States: 1:6

Team: Mario De Lorenzo, Pedro Theberge, Salvador Amendola, Jefferson Maurity Souza, Luis Henrique Da Silva, Carlos Castello Branco, Antonio Ferreira Jacobina, Adhemar Serpa
