= Rowing at the 1932 Summer Olympics – Men's eight =

Men's eight at the Games of the X Olympiad
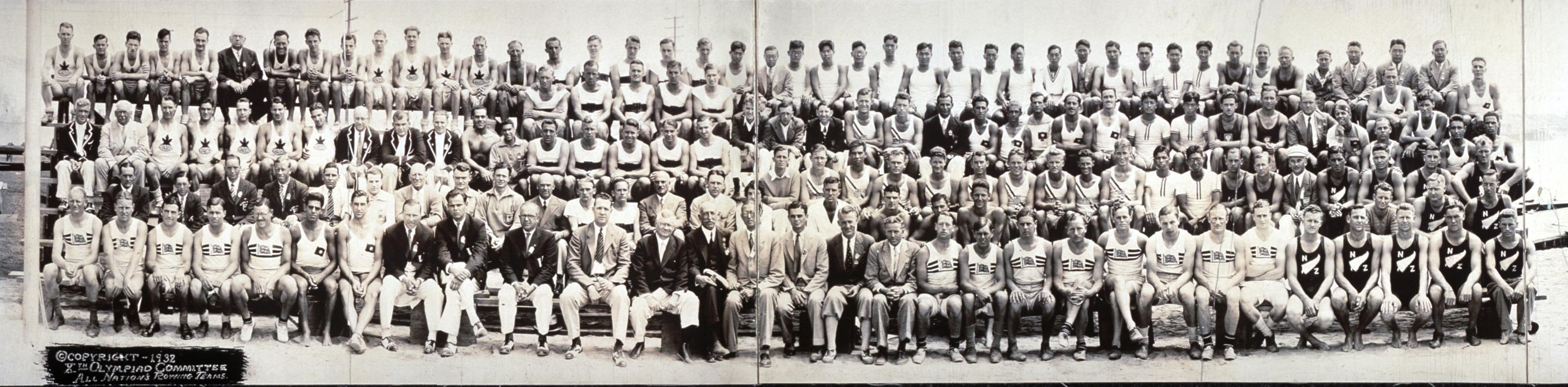
- National rowing teams at the 1932 Olympics
- Venue: Long Beach Marine Stadium
- Dates: August 10–13, 1932
- Competitors: 72 from 8 nations
- Winning time: 6:37.6

Medalists
1st place, gold medalist(s)		United States: James Blair; Charles Chandler; David Dunlap; Norris Graham; Duncan Gregg; Winslow Hall; Burton Jastram; Edwin Salisbury; Harold Tower (cox)
2nd place, silver medalist(s)		Italy: Mario Balleri; Renato Barbieri; Dino Barsotti; Renato Bracci; Vittorio Cioni; Guglielmo Del Bimbo; Enrico Garzelli; Cesare Milani; Roberto Vestrini (cox)
3rd place, bronze medalist(s)		Canada: Don Boal; Earl Eastwood; Harry Fry; Joseph Harris; Cedric Liddell; Les MacDonald; Stanley Stanyar; Albert Taylor; William Thoburn (cox)

The men's eight competition at the 1932 Summer Olympics in Los Angeles took place at the Long Beach Marine Stadium. It was held from 10 to 13 August. There were 8 boats (72 competitors) from 8 nations, with each nation limited to a single boat in the event. The event was won by the United States, the nation's fourth consecutive and sixth overall victory; the Americans had won every time they competed (missing 1908 and 1912). Silver went to Italy, that nation's second medal in the men's eight after a bronze in 1924. Canada repeated as bronze medalists, stretching their podium streak in the event to three Games.

== Background ==
This was the eighth appearance of the event. Rowing had been on the programme in 1896 but was cancelled due to bad weather. The men's eight has been held every time that rowing has been contested, beginning in 1900.

Great Britain and the United States were the dominant nations in the event, with the nations winning all seven prior Olympic men's eight competitions between them. The United States held a 5–2 edge and the reigning crown, having beaten the British team in the final in 1928 to take their third straight gold. The United States was again represented by the University of California, Berkeley (the 1928 winners), while Great Britain was now represented by the Leander Club. The Leander Club had won the Grand Challenge Cup at Henley in 1929 and 1932.

Brazil, Japan, and New Zealand each made their debut in the event. Canada, Great Britain, and the United States each made their sixth appearance, tied for most among nations to that point.

== Competition format ==
The "eight" event featured nine-person boats, with eight rowers and a coxswain. It was a sweep rowing event, with the rowers each having one oar (and thus each rowing on one side). The course used the 2000 metres distance that became the Olympic standard in 1912.

The 1932 competition had fewer boats than previous competitions and once again allowed more than two boats per race; this resulted in the event shrinking from 7 rounds in 1928 to 3 rounds. There were two main rounds (semifinals and a final), with one repechage round.

- The semifinals placed the 8 boats in 2 heats, with 4 boats per heat. The winner of each heat (2 boats total) advanced directly to the final, while the other boats (6 total) went to the repechage.
- The repechage had 6 boats. They were placed in 2 heats, with 3 boats each (before a withdrawal). The winner of each repechage heat (2 boats) rejoined the semifinal winners in the final, with the other boats (4 total, including the non-starter) eliminated.
- The final round consisted of a single final for the medals and 4th place.

== Schedule ==
Date	Time	Round
Wednesday, August 10, 1932	15:00	Heats
Friday, August 12, 1932		Repechage
Saturday, August 13, 1932	15:00	Final

== Results ==
=== Semifinals ===
The winners of each heat qualified to the final; the remainder went to the repechage.

==== Semifinal 1 ====
Rank	Rowers	Coxswain	Nation	Time	Notes
1	Mario Balleri; Renato Barbieri; Dino Barsotti; Renato Bracci; Vittorio Cioni; Guglielmo Del Bimbo; Enrico Garzelli; Roberto Vestrini	Cesare Milani	Italy	6:28.2	Q
2	Tom Askwith; David Haig-Thomas; Lewis Luxton; Donald McCowen; Kenneth Payne; Harold Rickett; Bill Sambell; Charles Sergel	John Ranking	Great Britain	6:34.4	R
3	Yoshio Enomoto; Shigeo Fujiwara; Saburo Hara; Kenzo Ikeda; Setsuo Matsura; Taro Nishidono; Hidemitsu Tanaka; Setsuji Tanaka	Toshi Sano	Japan	6:43.4	R
4	Fernando de Abreu; José de Campos; Vasco de Carvalho; Joaquim Faria; José Mò; Osório Pereira; Cláudionor Provenzano; Antônio Rebello Júnior	Amaro da Cunha	Brazil	6:52.2	R

==== Semifinal 2 ====
Rank	Rowers	Coxswain	Nation	Time	Notes
1	James Blair; Charles Chandler; David Dunlap; Duncan Gregg; Winslow Hall; Burton Jastram; Edwin Salisbury; Harold Tower	Norris Graham	United States	6:29.0	Q
2	Don Boal; Earl Eastwood; Harry Fry; Joseph Harris; Cedric Liddell; Stanley Stanyar; Albert Taylor; William Thoburn	Les MacDonald	Canada	6:33.2	R
3	Karl Aletter; Heinrich Bender; Walter Flinsch; Ernst Gaber; Hans-Wolfgang Heidland; Theodor Hüllinghoff; Hans Maier; Gerhard von Düsterlho	Fritz Bauer	Germany	6:36.8	R
4	George Cooke; Lawrence Jackson; Jack Macdonald; Bert Sandos; Charles Saunders; John Solomon; Cyril Stiles; Rangi Thompson	Delmont Gullery	New Zealand	6:38.2	R

=== Repechage ===
The winner from each heat qualified for the final.

==== Repechage heat 1 ====
Rank	Rowers	Coxswain	Nation	Time	Notes
1	Tom Askwith; David Haig-Thomas; Lewis Luxton; Donald McCowen; Kenneth Payne; Harold Rickett; Bill Sambell; Charles Sergel	John Ranking	Great Britain	6:49.0	Q
2	George Cooke; Lawrence Jackson; Jack Macdonald; Bert Sandos; Charles Saunders; John Solomon; Cyril Stiles; Rangi Thompson	Delmont Gullery	New Zealand	6:52.2	
—	Fernando de Abreu; José de Campos; Vasco de Carvalho; Joaquim Faria; José Mò; Osório Pereira; Cláudionor Provenzano; Antônio Rebello Júnior	Amaro da Cunha	Brazil	DNS	

==== Repechage heat 2 ====
Rank	Rowers	Coxswain	Nation	Time	Notes
1	Don Boal; Earl Eastwood; Harry Fry; Joseph Harris; Cedric Liddell; Stanley Stanyar; Albert Taylor; William Thoburn	Les MacDonald	Canada	7:03.2	Q
2	Karl Aletter; Heinrich Bender; Walter Flinsch; Ernst Gaber; Hans-Wolfgang Heidland; Theodor Hüllinghoff; Hans Maier; Gerhard von Düsterlho	Fritz Bauer	Germany	7:10.6	
3	Yoshio Enomoto; Shigeo Fujiwara; Saburo Hara; Kenzo Ikeda; Setsuo Matsura; Taro Nishidono; Hidemitsu Tanaka; Setsuji Tanaka	Toshi Sano	Japan	7:22.6	

=== Final ===
Rank	Rowers	Coxswain	Nation	Time
1st place, gold medalist(s)	James Blair; Charles Chandler; David Dunlap; Duncan Gregg; Winslow Hall; Burton Jastram; Edwin Salisbury; Harold Tower	Norris Graham	United States	6:37.6
2nd place, silver medalist(s)	Mario Balleri; Renato Barbieri; Dino Barsotti; Renato Bracci; Vittorio Cioni; Guglielmo Del Bimbo; Enrico Garzelli; Roberto Vestrini	Cesare Milani	Italy	6:37.8
3rd place, bronze medalist(s)	Don Boal; Earl Eastwood; Harry Fry; Joseph Harris; Cedric Liddell; Stanley Stanyar; Albert Taylor; William Thoburn	Les MacDonald	Canada	6:40.4
4	Tom Askwith; David Haig-Thomas; Lewis Luxton; Donald McCowen; Kenneth Payne; Harold Rickett; Bill Sambell; Charles Sergel	John Ranking	Great Britain	6:40.8
