= Jastram =

Jastram is a surname. Notable people with the surname include:

- Birgit Schnieber-Jastram (born 1946), German politician
- Burton Jastram (1910–1995), American rower
- Jo Jastram (1928–2011), German sculptor
