= Setsuo =

- Gender: Male

Origin
- Origin: Japanese
- Meaning: Different meanings depending on the kanji used

Setsuo (written: 節男, 節雄, 節生, 節夫 or 設雄) is a masculine Japanese given name. Notable people with the name include:

- Akinoumi Setsuo (安藝ノ海 節男; 1914–1979), Japanese sumo wrestler
- Hanahikari Setsuo (花光 節夫; born 1940), Japanese sumo wrestler
- Setsuo Itō (伊藤 節生; born 1991), Japanese voice actor
- Setsuo Matsura (松浦 設雄), Japanese rower
- Setsuo Nara (奈良 節雄; born 1936), Japanese basketball player
- Setsuo Yamada (山田 節男; 1898–1975), Japanese politician
- Setsuo Yokomichi (横路 節雄; 1911–1967), Japanese politician
