= Theodor Hüllinghoff =

German rower

Personal information
- Nationality: German
- Born: 18 October 1910; Frankfurt, Germany

Sport
- Sport: Rowing

Theodor Hüllinghoff (born 18 October 1910, date of death unknown) was a German rower. He competed in the men's eight event at the 1932 Summer Olympics.
