= Gerhard von Düsterlho =

German rower

Personal information
- Nationality: German
- Born: 13 March 1910; Magdeburg, German Empire
- Died: 13 February 1973 (aged 62); Mannheim, West Germany

Sport
- Sport: Rowing

Gerhard von Düsterlho (13 March 1910 – 13 February 1973) was a German rower. He competed in the men's eight event at the 1932 Summer Olympics.
