= Enrico Mariani =

Italian rower

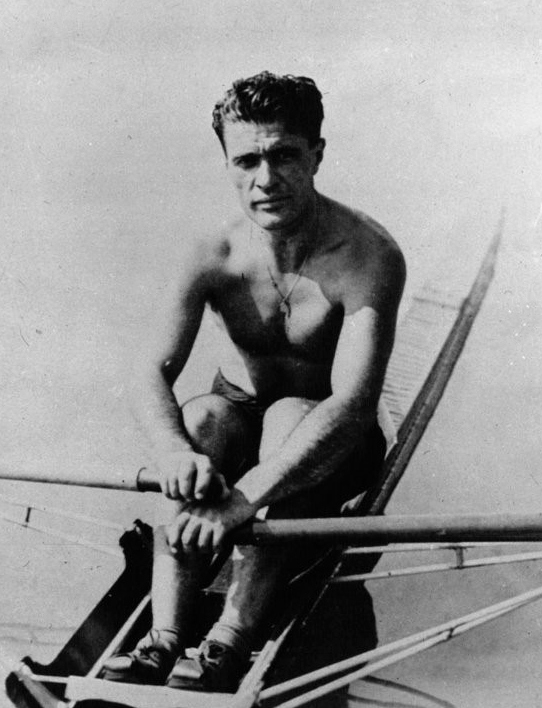
- Enrico Mariani at the 1932 European Championships

Sport
- Sport: Rowing
Medal record
Representing Italy
European Rowing Championships
Silver medal – second place	1931 Paris	Single sculls
Bronze medal – third place	1931 Paris	Double sculls
Gold medal – first place	1932 Belgrade	Single sculls

Enrico Mariani was an Italian rower who won a gold, a silver and a bronze medal at the European championships of 1931–1932.
