= Heinrich Bender =

German rower

Personal information
- Nationality: German
- Born: 2 December 1902; Mosbach, Germany
- Died: 10 July 1943 (aged 40); Gouria, Greece

Sport
- Sport: Rowing

Heinrich Bender (2 December 1902 – 10 July 1943) was a German rower. He competed in the men's eight event at the 1932 Summer Olympics. He was killed in action during World War II.
