= 1931 European Rowing Championships =

- Venue: Seine
- Location: Paris, France

The 1931 European Rowing Championships were rowing championships held on the Seine in the French capital city of Paris in the suburb of Suresnes. The competition was for men only and they competed in all seven Olympic boat classes (M1x, M2x, M2-, M2+, M4-, M4+, M8+).

== Medal summary ==
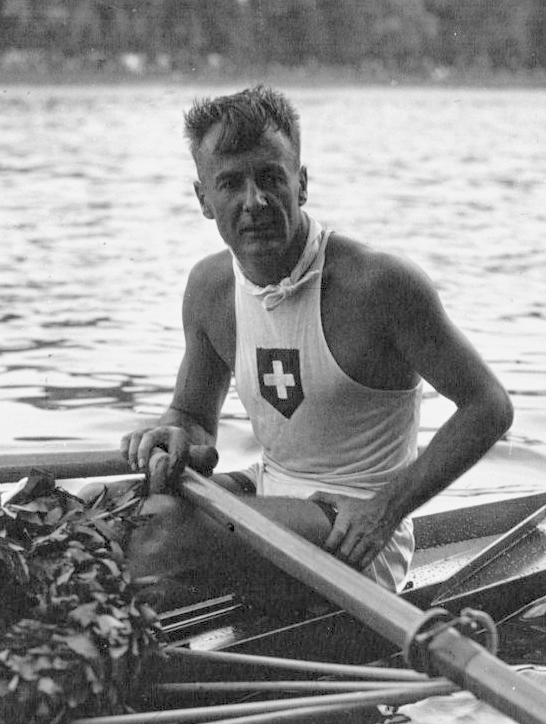
Édouard Candeveau won the single sculls

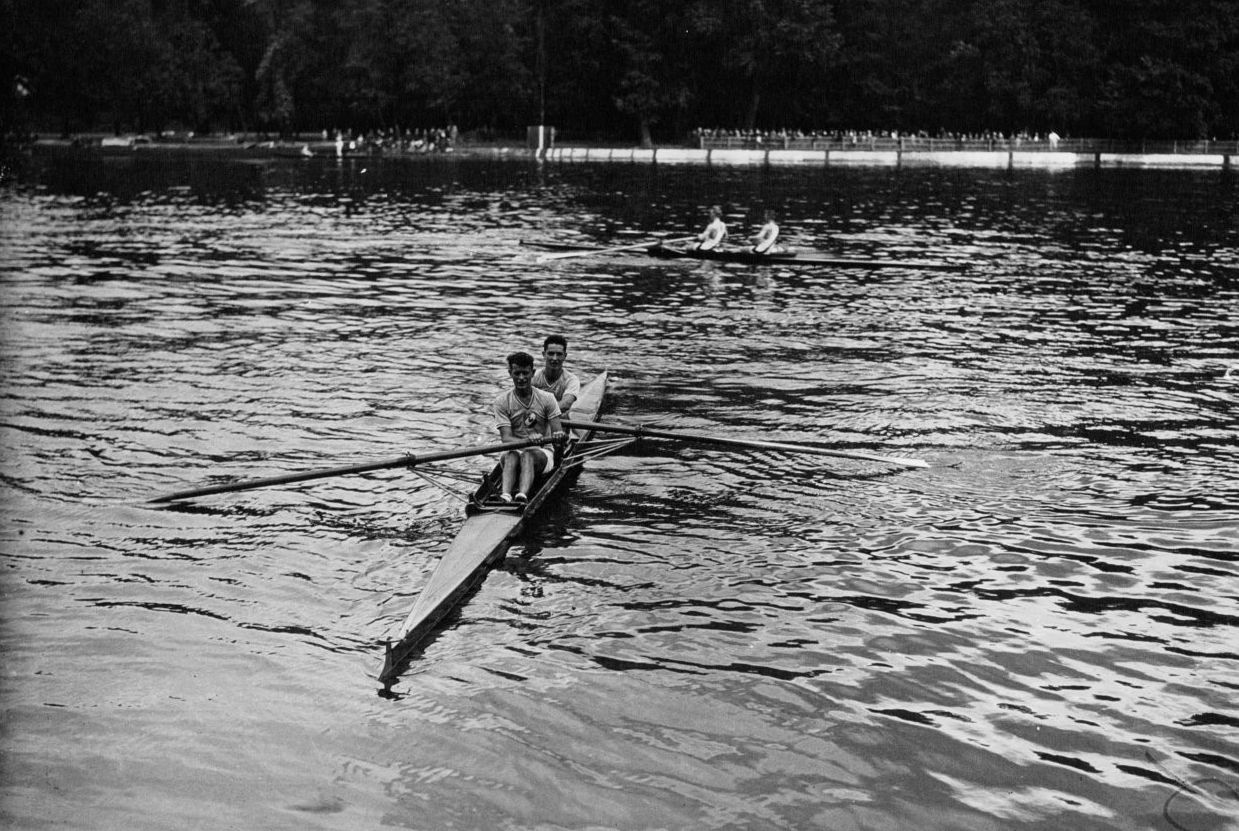
The French coxless pair of Edgard Chassaing and Robert Lefèvre won bronze

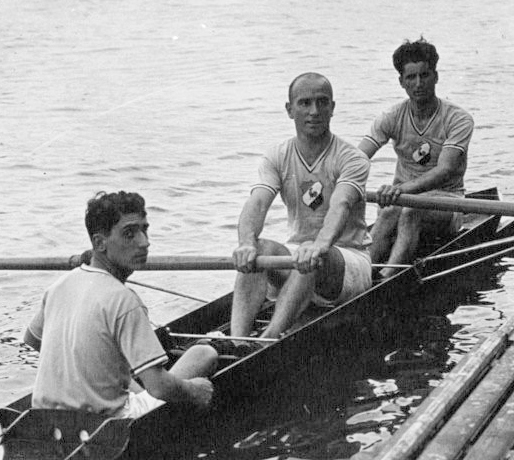
The French coxed pair Brusa, Giriat and Brunet (cox) won gold

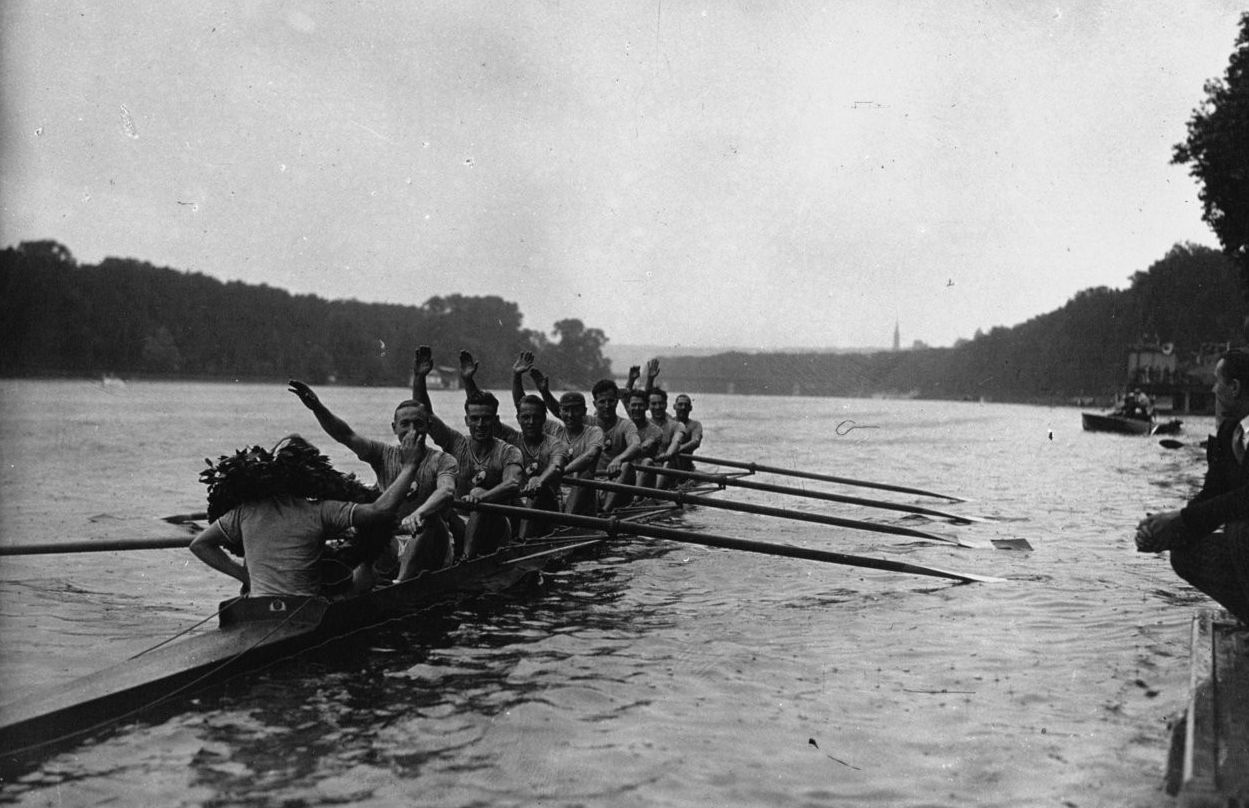
The French eight after winning their race

Event	Gold		Silver		Bronze	
Event	Country & rowers	Time	Country & rowers	Time	Country & rowers	Time
M1x	Switzerland; Édouard Candeveau		Italy; Enrico Mariani		France; Vincent Saurin	
M2x	Switzerland; Helmut von Bidder; Hans Hottinger		Hungary; Béla Szendey; Andras Szendey		Italy; Michelangelo Bernasconi; Enrico Mariani	
M2-	Netherlands; Pieter Roelofsen; Godfried Roëll		Italy; Rino Galeazzi; Vittorio Lucchini		France; Edgard Chassaing; Robert Lefèvre	
M2+	France; Anselme Brusa; André Giriat; Pierre Brunet (cox)		Italy; Romeo Sisti; Zemiro Siboni; Guido Spernazzati (cox)		Switzerland; Marcel Heitsch; Erwin Allemann; Julien Cotts (cox)	
M4-	Switzerland; Gustav Wachtel; Paul Wachtel; Ernst Bühler; Willy Müller		Poland; Henryk Budziński; Zygmunt Kasprzak; Karol Nowakowski; Jan Mikołajczak		Netherlands; P.S. Heerema; R.E.J. Weber; W.E.F. Winckel; G. Slotboom	
M4+	Italy; Antonio Garzoni Provenzani; Francesco Cossu; Giliante D'Este; Antonio Ghiardello; Emilio Gerolimini (cox)		Denmark; Aage Hansen; Christian Olsen; Walther Christiansen; Richard Olsen; Poul Richardt (cox)		Switzerland; Karl Schöchlin; Hans Schöchlin; Paul Käser; Hans Niklaus; Antoine Mambretti (cox)	
M8+	France; Albert Bonzano; Jean Tarcher; Maurice Bernin; Daniel Guilbert; Charles Luraud; Jean Cottez; Louis Devillié; Émile Lecuirot; Blondiau (cox)		Italy; Vittorio Cioni; Enrico Garzelli; Guglielmo Del Bimbo; Dino Barsotti; Renato Bracci; Eugenio Nenci; Mario Balleri; Renato Barbieri; Cesare Milani (cox)		Hungary; Pál Domonkos; Károly Gyurkóczy; Kornél Klima; László Bartók; Béla Blum; Hugó Ballya; László Szabó; Zoltán Török; Béla Zoltán (cox)	
