= Arthur Charles Hind =

Indian field hockey player (1904–1991)

Olympic medal record

Men's field hockey

Representing India
Gold medal – first place	1932 Los Angeles	Team competition

Arthur Charles Hind (22 December 1904 – 20 November 1991) was an Indian field hockey player who competed in the 1932 Summer Olympics. He was born in Delhi.

In 1932, he was a member of the Indian field hockey team, which won the gold medal. He played as a goalkeeper against Japan. India won 11-1, the goal by Inohara was the first conceded by India, who had won the gold in the 1928 Olympics without conceding a goal.
