= Hans-Wolfgang Heidland =

German rower

Personal information
- Nationality: German
- Born: 20 July 1912; Koblenz, Germany
- Died: 11 January 1992 (aged 79); Malsburg-Marzell, Germany

Sport
- Sport: Rowing

Hans-Wolfgang Heidland (20 July 1912 – 11 January 1992) was a German rower. He competed in the men's eight event at the 1932 Summer Olympics.
