= Misao Yokota =

Japanese swimmer (born 1917)

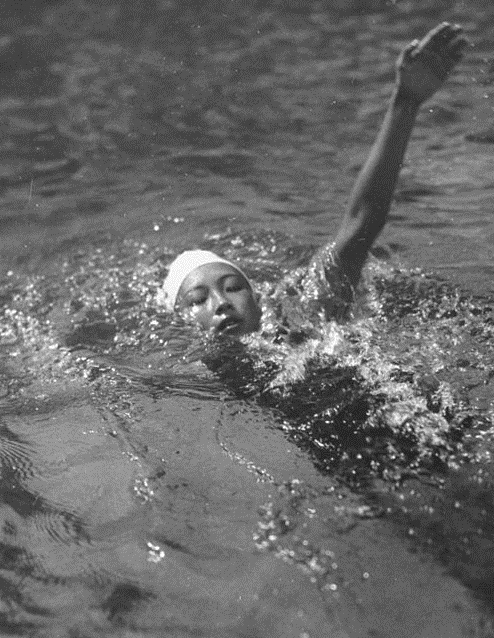
- Misao Yokota at the 1932 Summer Olympics

Personal information
- Born: 3 February 1917 Kyoto, Japan

Sport
- Sport: Swimming

Misao Yokota (横田 みさを, Yokota Misao; born 3 February 1917, date of death unknown) was a Japanese swimmer who competed at the 1932 Summer Olympics. She finished fifth in the 4×100 metre freestyle relay and was eliminated in the first round of the 100 m backstroke event.
