= Walter Flinsch =

German rower and WWII pilot

Personal information
- Nationality: German
- Born: 7 February 1903; New York City, New York, U.S.
- Died: 3 February 1943 (aged 39); Schwasdorf, Nazi Germany

Sport
- Sport: Rowing

Achievements and titles
- Olympic finals: Rowing at the 1932 Summer Olympics: Men's coxless four – Silver

Walter Flinsch (7 February 1903 – 3 February 1943) was a German rower who competed in the 1928 Summer Olympics and in the 1932 Summer Olympics.

In 1928 he was eliminated in the first repechage round of the single sculls event.

Four years later he won the silver medal as member of the German boat in the coxless fours competition. He was also part of the German boat which eliminated in the repechage of the eight event.

== Personal life ==
Flinsch worked as a pilot for Lufthansa before the Second World War. During the war, he served as a test pilot in the Luftwaffe. On 3 February 1943, Flinsch lost control piloting a Heinkel He 177 bomber. He successfully bailed out of the aircraft, but did not open his parachute and was killed.
