= Harry Forssell =

Brazilian swimmer

Personal information
- Full name: Harry Forssell
- Nationality: Brazil
- Born: October 1, 1907 São Paulo, São Paulo, Brazil
- Died: September 15, 2006 (aged 98) Itanhaém, São Paulo, Brazil
- Height: 1.80 m (5 ft 11 in)

Sport
- Sport: Swimming
- Strokes: Breaststroke
Medal record
Men's swimming
Representing Brazil

Harry Forssell (October 1, 1907 – September 15, 2006) was an Olympic breaststroke swimmer from Brazil, who participated at one Summer Olympics. He was also a politician.

Forssell lived in São Paulo until around age 20. He was a member of the Associação Atlética São Paulo, participating in swimming and water polo. He won the Travessia de São Paulo a Nado, contested on the Tietê River, several times, and broke Brazilian and South American records in the 100-metre and 200-metre breaststroke.

In 1927, he moved with his family to Itanhaém. The family wanted to invest in the cultivation and marketing of bananas, for the land and climate are extremely favorable for this. In 1930 Harry's mother, Lois Forssell built the municipality's first factory making banana products.

State champion and one of the top freestyle swimmers in the country in the 1930s, Forssell got good results and was selected for the Brazilian team that participated in the 1932 Summer Olympics in Los Angeles. He did not win a medal but retains the distinction of having been the first man from Itanhaém to have participated in the Olympics.

After his achievements as a sportsman, Forssell ran for mayor of Itanhaém in 1947 and was the first mayor elected by direct vote of the people in the city's history. He took office in 1948 when all the assets of the prefecture were the penitentiary (which also functioned as a chamber), a cart, and a donkey. The city had just four or five employees. Despite this precarious situation, Forssell oversaw the construction of the Benedito Calixto school which replaced the old, crumbling elementary school, then still in use. The new school was inaugurated in December 1951. He enabled the arrival of the first public telephone in the municipality. It opened in 1949, with a call to the State Governor. During his government, the city had emancipated. His first term was from 1948 to 1951.

He ran for the office of Alderman and served from 1952 to 1955. He ran again for mayor in 1959 and was re-elected. His second term ran from 1960 to 1963. In 2004 his son John Carlos Neto Forssell was also elected mayor of Itanhaém.

Forssell died of natural causes at the Regional Hospital of Itanhaém on September 15, 2006, at 98 years of age. In his honor, the Educational Complex and Sports Hall was named for him.
