= Toshi Sano =

Japanese rower

Personal information
- Nationality: Japanese
- Born: c. 1911

Sport
- Sport: Rowing

Toshi Sano (佐野 敏, Sano Toshi) (born c.1911) was a Japanese rower. He competed in the men's eight event at the 1932 Summer Olympics.
