= Osório Pereira =

Brazilian rower

Personal information
- Nationality: Brazilian
- Born: March 1905
- Died: 27 December 1991 (aged 86)

Sport
- Sport: Rowing

Osório Pereira (March 1905 – 27 December 1991) was a Brazilian rower. He competed in two events at the 1932 Summer Olympics.
