= José Mò =

Brazilian rower

Personal information
- Born: 22 September 1907; Rio de Janeiro, Brazil

Sport
- Sport: Rowing

José Rodriges Mò (born 22 September 1907, date of death unknown) was a Brazilian rower. He competed in the men's eight event at the 1932 Summer Olympics.
