= Hatsuko Morioka =

Japanese swimmer (born 1915)

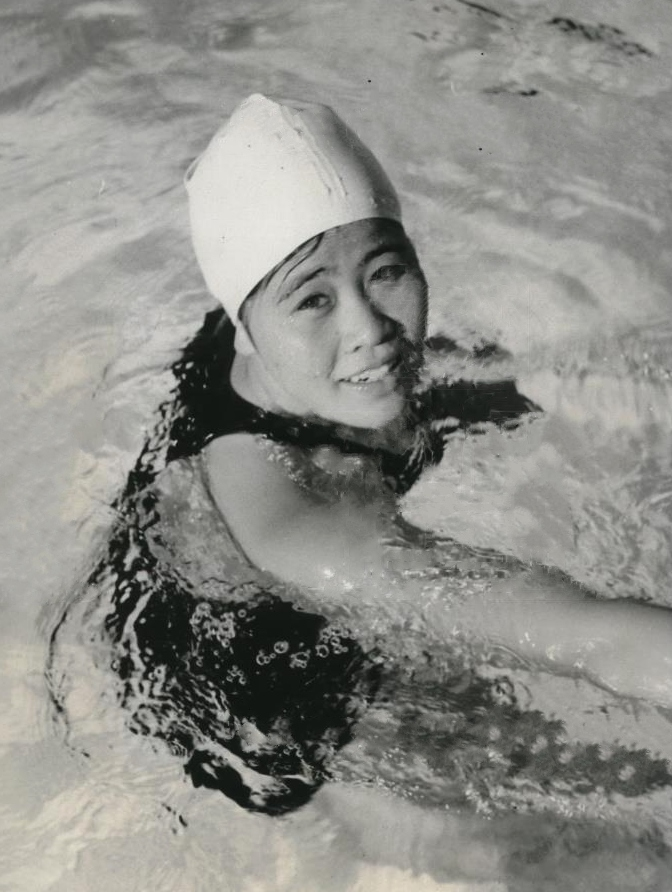
- Morioka at the 1932 Olympics

Personal information
- Full name: Morioka Hatsuko
- Born: June 22, 1915 Hashimoto, Wakayama, Japan

Sport
- Sport: Swimming
- Event: Freestyle

Hatsuko Morioka (守岡 初子, Morioka Hatsuko; born June 22, 1915, date of death unknown) was a Japanese freestyle swimmer. She participated in two Olympic Games with Hideko Maehata, both of whom were from the same area, and Morioka competed the individual 400 m and 4 × 100 m relay events at the 1932 and 1936 Summer Olympics with the best result of fifth place in the relay in 1932.
