= Antônio Rebello Júnior =

Brazilian rower

Personal information
- Born: 2 February 1906; Rio de Janeiro, Brazil
- Died: 14 May 1994 (aged 88)

Sport
- Sport: Rowing

Antônio Rebello Júnior (2 February 1906 – 14 May 1994) was a Brazilian rower. He competed in the men's eight event at the 1932 Summer Olympics.
