= Jorge de Paula =

Brazilian swimmer

Personal information
- Full name: Jorge Frias de Paula
- Nationality: Brazil
- Born: November 1906 Rio de Janeiro, Rio de Janeiro, Brazil
- Died: 2 January 1979 (aged 72)
- Height: 1.78 m (5 ft 10 in)

Sport
- Sport: Swimming
- Strokes: Backstroke
Medal record
Men's swimming
Representing Brazil

Jorge Frias de Paula (November 1906 – 2 January 1979) was an Olympic backstroke swimmer from Brazil, who participated at one Summer Olympics for his native country. He was born in Rio de Janeiro. At the 1932 Summer Olympics in Los Angeles, he swam the 100-metre backstroke, not reaching the finals.
