= Yoshio Enomoto =

Japanese rower

Personal information
- Nationality: Japanese
- Born: c. 1911; Muroran, Japan

Sport
- Sport: Rowing

Yoshio Enomoto (born c. 1911) was a Japanese rower. He competed in the men's eight event at the 1932 Summer Olympics.
