= Fernando de Abreu (rower) =

Brazilian rower (1906–1974)

Personal information
- Full name: Fernando Luiz Nabuco de Abreu
- Born: 23 July 1906; Rio de Janeiro, Brazil
- Died: 26 April 1974 (aged 67); São Paulo, Brazil

Sport
- Sport: Rowing

Fernando de Abreu (23 July 1906 – 26 April 1974) was a Brazilian rower. He competed in the men's eight event at the 1932 Summer Olympics.
