= Joaquim Faria =

Brazilian rower

Personal information
- Born: 14 July 1904; Rio de Janeiro, Brazil
- Died: 23 February 1977 (aged 72)

Sport
- Sport: Rowing

Joaquim Faria (14 July 1904 – 23 February 1977) was a Brazilian rower. He competed in the men's eight event at the 1932 Summer Olympics.
