= Kenzo Ikeda =

Japanese rower

Personal information
- Nationality: Japanese
- Born: c. 1905; Hiroshima, Japan

Sport
- Sport: Rowing

Kenzo Ikeda (c. 1905 – ?) was a Japanese rower. He competed in the men's eight event at the 1932 Summer Olympics.
