= Antônio Guimarães =

Brazilian sports shooter (1900–1975)

Personal information
- Born: 4 May 1900; Rio de Janeiro, Brazil
- Died: 27 February 1975 (aged 74); Rio de Janeiro, Brazil

Sport
- Sport: Sports shooting

Antônio Guimarães (4 May 1900 – 27 February 1975) was a Brazilian sports shooter. He competed at the 1932, 1936, 1948 and 1952 Summer Olympics.
