= Cláudionor Provenzano =

Brazilian rower

Personal information
- Born: 9 May 1893; Rio de Janeiro, Brazil
- Died: 2 February 1965 (aged 73)

Sport
- Sport: Rowing

Cláudionor Provenzano (9 May 1893 – 2 February 1965) was a Brazilian rower. He competed in the men's eight event at the 1932 Summer Olympics.
