= João Pereira (swimmer) =

Brazilian swimmer (1905–1984)

Personal information
- Full name: João Pedro Thomaz Pereira
- Nationality: Brazil
- Born: March 1905 São Paulo, São Paulo, Brazil
- Died: 27 June 1984 (aged 81)
- Height: 1.78 m (5 ft 10 in)

Sport
- Sport: Swimming
- Strokes: Freestyle

João Pedro Thomaz Pereira (March 1905 – 27 June 1984) was an Olympic freestyle swimmer from Brazil, who participated at one Summer Olympics for his native country. He was born in São Paulo.

At the 1932 Summer Olympics in Los Angeles, he swam the 100-metre freestyle, not reaching the finals.
