= John Ranking =

English rower

John Maurice Ranking (3 July 1910 – 9 November 1959) was an English rower who competed at the 1932 Summer Olympics.

Ranking was born at Holborn, London, the son of Dr. R. M. Ranking. He was educated at Cheltenham College where he was cox of the Cheltenham boat and at Pembroke College, Cambridge. In 1931 he was cox of the winning Cambridge boat in the Boat Race. He coxed the winning Cambridge boat in the Boat Race again in 1932. The 1932 crew won the Grand Challenge Cup at Henley, rowing as Leander Club. They were subsequently chosen to represent Great Britain at the 1932 Summer Olympics in Los Angeles, where they came fourth in the eights.

Ranking took his B.A. in the Natural Sciences Tripos in 1932 and completed his medical training at St Thomas's Hospital. He qualified by taking the London Conjoint diploma in 1936 and in the following year he obtained the degrees of M.B. and B.Chir. In 1938 was admitted a MRCP. After qualifying, he held a number of house appointments at St. Thomas's Hospital, and was also house-physician at the Great Ormond Street Hospital for Sick Children.

During the Second World War Ranking served in the R.A.M.C., with the rank of temporary major.

In 1948 Ranking became a consultant in general medicine at the Kent and Sussex Hospital, Tunbridge Wells and retained the post until his death. His expertise and skill was often publicly acknowledged. He maintained his interest in rowing and was a member of the Leander Club till his death.

In 1946 Ranking married Miss Patricia McLeod.

== See also ==
- List of Cambridge University Boat Race crews
