= Shigeo Fujiwara =

Japanese rower

Personal information
- Nationality: Japanese
- Born: c. 1908

Sport
- Sport: Rowing

Shigeo Fujiwara (born c. 1908) was a Japanese rower. He competed in the men's eight event at the 1932 Summer Olympics.
