= Amaro da Cunha =

Brazilian rower

Personal information
- Full name: Amaro Miranda da Cunha
- Born: 15 June 1912; Rio de Janeiro, Brazil
- Died: 15 March 1988 (aged 75)

Sport
- Sport: Rowing

Amaro Miranda da Cunha (15 June 1912 – 15 March 1988) was a Brazilian rower. He competed in the men's eight event at the 1932 Summer Olympics. He was the brother of Carmen Miranda.
