= Vasco de Carvalho =

Brazilian rower (1902–1990)

Personal information
- Nationality: Brazilian
- Born: 9 March 1902; Viseu, Portugal
- Died: 31 October 1990 (aged 88)

Sport
- Sport: Rowing

Vasco de Carvalho (9 March 1902 – 31 October 1990) was a Brazilian rower. He competed in the men's eight event at the 1932 Summer Olympics.
