= Donald McCowen =

British rower

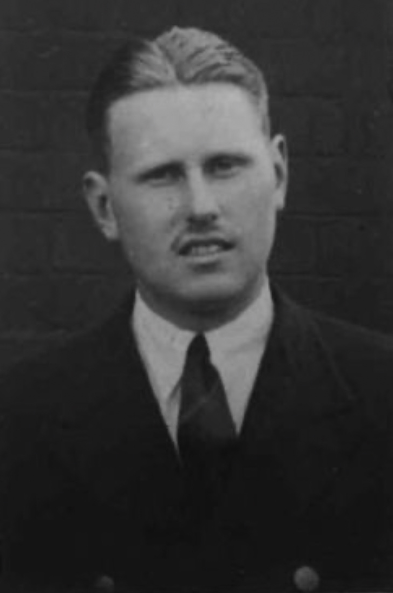
- Born: 26 February 1908; Dublin, Ireland
- Died: September 5, 1998; Bermuda
- Other name: Ritchie
- Occupations: Olympian, sailor, rower
- Known for: British Rowing Team at the 1932 Olympics
- Relatives: Mikey Bahen (great grandson)
- Military Service
- Allegiance: United Kingdom
- Branch: Royal Navy Volunteer Reserve
- Service years: 1939-45
- Rank: Lieutenant Commander
- Commands: HM Motor Torpedo Boat 693 (1943-44); 53rd Motor Torpedo Boat Flotilla (1944); HMS Beehive (1945)
- Conflicts: Second World War: Battle of the Atlantic; Normandy Landings
- Awards: Distinguished Service Order Distinguished Service Cross

Donald Henry Ewan McCowen DSO, DSC (26 February 1908 – 5 September 1998) was a British rower who competed in the 1932 Summer Olympics.

McCowen was born in Dublin, Ireland. He was educated at Cheltenham College and Pembroke College, Cambridge. In 1932 he was a member of the winning Cambridge boat in the Boat Race. The 1932 crew won the Grand Challenge Cup at Henley Royal Regatta rowing as Leander Club. They were subsequently chosen to represent Great Britain at the 1932 Summer Olympics in Los Angeles, where they came fourth in the eights.

During World War II McCowen joined the Royal Navy Volunteer Reserve and served in the coastal forces and on motor torpedo boats. He was awarded the DSO and DSC for actions in 1944, and received the surrender of the first surface craft (2 E-boats) from Rear Admiral Karl Bruning on 13 May 1945.

After the war in 1947 McCowen continued his connections with the sea and purchased the ocean sailing yacht Gemini. He also played golf.

McCowen lived at Bighton Manor, Alresford, Hampshire, and died in Bermuda at the age of 90.

== See also ==
- List of Cambridge University Boat Race crews
- Motor torpedo boat
- E-boat – includes a photo of one of the E-boats surrendering
- Normandy landings
