= Yukie Arata =

Japanese swimmer (born 1914)

Personal information
- Born: 25 October 1914

Sport
- Sport: Swimming

Yukie Arata (荒田 雪江, Arata Yukie; born 25 October 1914, date of death unknown) was a Japanese freestyle swimmer. She competed in the 1932 Summer Olympics.

In 1932 she was a member of the Japanese relay team which finished fifth in the 4 × 100 metre freestyle relay event. In the 100 metre freestyle competition she was eliminated in the first round.
