= Mario Zorzi =

Italian sports shooter

Personal information
- Born: 23 July 1910; Mattarello, Italy
- Died: 17 February 1944 (aged 33); Frascati, Italy

Sport
- Sport: Sports shooting

Mario Zorzi (23 July 1910 – 17 February 1944) was an Italian sports shooter. He competed at the 1932 Summer Olympics and 1936 Summer Olympics. He was killed in a bombing raid during World War II.
