= Taro Nishidono =

Japanese rower

Personal information
- Nationality: Japanese
- Born: c. 1910

Sport
- Sport: Rowing

Taro Nishidono (born c.1910) was a Japanese rower. He competed in the men's eight event at the 1932 Summer Olympics.
