= Manoel Braga =

Brazilian sports shooter

Personal information
- Born: 31 March 1902 Rio de Janeiro, Brazil
- Died: 7 June 1955 (aged 53)

Sport
- Sport: Sports shooting

Manoel Braga (31 March 1902 – 7 June 1955) was a Brazilian sports shooter. He competed at the 1932, 1936 and 1948 Summer Olympics.
