= Duncan Gregg =

American rower

Medal record

Men's rowing

Representing the United States

Olympic Games
Gold medal – first place	1932 Los Angeles	Men's eight

Duncan Smith Gregg (February 28, 1910 – February 14, 1989) was an American rower who competed in the 1932 Summer Olympics.

In 1932, he won the gold medal as member of the American boat in the eights competition.
