= Winslow Hall (rower) =

American rower (1912–1995)

Medal record

Men's rowing

Representing the United States

Olympic Games
Gold medal – first place	1932 Los Angeles	Men's eight

Winslow William Hall (May 15, 1912 – December 27, 1995) was an American rower, born in Oakland, California, who competed in the 1932 Summer Olympics.

In 1932, he won the gold medal as member of the American boat in the eights competition.
