= Cedric Liddell =

Canadian rower

Olympic medal record

Men's rowing

Representing Canada
Bronze medal – third place	1928 Amsterdam	Eight

Cedric Haswell Liddell (June 11, 1913 – June 4, 1981) was a Canadian rower who competed in the 1932 Summer Olympics and the 1936 Summer Olympics.

In 1932 he won the bronze medal as member of the Canadian boat in the eights competition. He also competed in the 1936 eights competition.
