= Attilio Pavesi =

Italian cyclist (1910–2011)

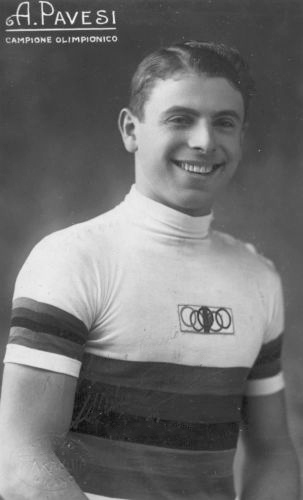
- Pavesi in 1931

Personal information
- Born: 1 October 1910 Caorso, Kingdom of Italy
- Died: 2 August 2011 (aged 100) Buenos Aires, Argentina

Cycling career
- Sport: Cycling
- Role: Rider

Amateur team
Medal record
Men's road bicycle racing
Representing Italy
Olympic Games
Gold medal – first place	1932 Los Angeles	Individual time trial
Gold medal – first place	1932 Los Angeles	Team time trial

Attilio Pavesi (1 October 1910 – 2 August 2011) was an Italian cyclist who won the individual and team road races at the 1932 Summer Olympics. The same year he placed second in the Giro di Sicilia, and in 1933–35 rode as professional, but with no success.

Pavesi was the 11th child in an affluent family in Caorso, Emilia-Romagna. At the beginning of World War II he immigrated to San Miguel, Buenos Aires, Argentina, where he continued racing, ran his bike shop, and organized cycling races. He died at the age of 100 in a retirement home in Buenos Aires. At the time of his death he was thought to be the oldest surviving Olympic champion and one of the oldest living Olympic competitors.
