= Don Boal =

Canadian rower

Medal record

Men's Rowing

Representing Canada

Olympic Games
Bronze medal – third place	1932 Los Angeles	Eights

British Empire Games
Bronze medal – third place	1930 Hamilton	Eights

Don Boal
- Born: Donald "Don" Gordon Boal; September 20, 1907
- Died: July 31, 1953 (aged 45); Ottawa

Donald Gordon Boal (September 20, 1907 – July 31, 1953) was a Canadian rower who competed in the 1932 Summer Olympics.

He was born in Toronto and died in a car accident in Ottawa.

In 1932 he was a crew member of the Canadian boat which won the bronze medal in the Olympic eights event.

At the 1930 Empire Games he won the bronze medal with the Canadian boat in the eights competition.
