= Toshio Usami =

Japanese field hockey player

Olympic medal record

Men's field hockey
Silver medal – second place	1932 Los Angeles	Team competition

Toshio Usami (Japanese: 宇佐美 敏夫, February 22, 1908 – June 1, 1991) was a Japanese field hockey player who competed in the 1932 Summer Olympics. He was born in Aichi Prefecture, Japan. In 1932 he was a member of the Japanese field hockey team, which won the silver medal. He played two matches as forward.
