= Setsuo Matsura =

Japanese rower

Personal information
- Nationality: Japanese
- Born: c. 1906; Hiroshima, Japan

Sport
- Sport: Rowing

Setsuo Matsura (松浦 設雄, Matsura Setsuo) (born c.1906) was a Japanese rower. He competed in the men's eight event at the 1932 Summer Olympics.
