= Charles Chandler (rower) =

American rower (1911–1982)

Olympic medal record

Men's rowing

Representing the United States
Gold medal – first place	1932 Los Angeles	Eight

Charles Robert Chandler (July 22, 1911 – June 22, 1982) was an American rower who competed in the 1932 Summer Olympics.

He was born in California and died in Alameda, California.

In 1932, he won the gold medal as member of the American boat in the eights competition.
