= Omero Bonoli =

Italian artistic gymnast

- Born: 17 September 1909 Ravenna, Kingdom of Italy
- Died: 17 October 1985 (aged 76) Ravenna, Italy
- Height: 1.67 m (5 ft 6 in)

Gymnastics career
- Discipline: Men's artistic gymnastics
- Country represented: Italy
- Gym: Forti e Liberi Ravenna
Medal record
Men's artistic gymnastics
Representing Italy
Olympic Games
Silver medal – second place	1932 Los Angeles	Pommel horse

Omero Bonoli (17 September 1909 – 17 October 1985) was an Italian artistic gymnast who competed in the 1932 Summer Olympics. He was born in Ravenna. In 1932 he won the silver medal in the pommel horse competition.
