= Renzo Minoli =

Italian fencer (1904–1965)

Personal information
- Born: 6 May 1904 Milan, Italy
- Died: 18 April 1965 (aged 60) Milan, Italy

Sport
- Sport: Fencing
Medal record
Men's fencing
Representing Italy
Olympic Games
Gold medal – first place	1928 Amsterdam	Épée, team
Silver medal – second place	1932 Los Angeles	Épée, team

Renzo Minoli (6 May 1904 – 18 April 1965) was an Italian fencer. He won a gold medal in the team épée event at the 1928 Summer Olympics and a silver in the same event at the 1932 Summer Olympics.
