= Haruhiko Kon =

Japanese field hockey player

Olympic medal record

Men's field hockey
Silver medal – second place	1932 Los Angeles	Team competition

Haruhiko Kon (今 治彦, Kon Haruhiko) (born August 17, 1910, date of death unknown) was a Japanese field hockey player who competed in the 1932 Summer Olympics. He was born in Tokyo, Japan. In 1932 he was a member of the Japanese field hockey team, which won the silver medal. He played two matches as forward.
