= Shunkichi Hamada =

Japanese field hockey player

Hamada Shunkichi
Personal information
- Native name: 浜田 駿吉
- Nationality: Japanese
- Born: October 19, 1910 Minamiawaji, Hyōgo, Japan
- Died: December 7, 2009 (aged 99). Shibuya, Tokyo, Japan
- Education: Keio University

Sport
- Sport: Men's field hockey
Medal record
Men's field hockey
Representing Japan
Olympic Games
Silver medal – second place	1932 Los Angeles	Team competition

Shunkichi Hamada (浜田 駿吉, Hamada Shunkichi) (October 19, 1910 – December 7, 2009) was a Japanese field hockey player who competed in the 1932 Summer Olympics and 1936 Summer Olympics.

Hamada was born in what is now part of Minamiawaji, Hyōgo, Japan. In 1932, while a student at Keio University, he was selected to be a member of the Japanese field hockey team at the 1932 Los Angeles Olympics. He played two matches as goalkeeper. Thirteen goals were scored against him, but the team won the silver medal.

Four years later, Hamada was a member of the Japanese field hockey team at the 1936 Berlin Olympics. The team won two games and lost one in elimination round and did not advance. Hamada played all three matches as goalkeeper, during which eleven goals were scored against him.

Hamada died of heart failure in Shibuya, Tokyo on December 7, 2009, at the age of 99.
