= Les MacDonald =

Canadian rower

Medal record

Men's rowing

Representing Canada

Olympic Games
Bronze medal – third place	1932 Los Angeles	Eight

British Empire Games
Bronze medal – third place	1930 Hamilton	Eight

George Leslie MacDonald (5 October 1906 – 25 September 1997), known as Les or Shorty MacDonald, competed for Canada in rowing events in the 1932 and 1936 Olympics, winning a bronze medal as coxswain in the men's eight event in the 1932 games in Los Angeles. He also won a bronze medal in the same event at the 1930 British Empire Games.

MacDonald was born in Hamilton, Ontario. His adult height of 5 ft 5 in (165 cm) brought him the nickname "Shorty", but he commenced his sporting career in basketball before joining Hamilton's Leander Rowing Club. Prior to his rowing career MacDonald worked for Dominion Power, now Ontario Hydro. At the age of 19 he received a commendation from the Governor General of Canada for rescuing and reviving a young boy who had fallen into the waters of Burlington Bay.

There was controversy over the result of the men's eight in the 1936 Olympics. Prior to the race the team was out practising when a spectator boat came too close to the rowing shell, and one of its occupants was hit and injured by an oar. The Canadian team's equipment was confiscated and they were forced to compete using old German equipment, and instructed by German officials not to leave the country until a full inquiry had taken place. The team finished fourth and left Germany immediately with the assistance of Olympic officials, who had concerns about the outcome of the proposed enquiry.

MacDonald served in the armed forces during World War II, and spent some time in London where he worked in bomb disposal. After the war he was decorated for his role.

He worked for Ontario Hydro until his retirement at age 65. In the mid-1960s he served as Head Coach of Leander Rowing Club. He died during a visit to Scotland in 1997, aged 90.
