= Kenichi Konishi =

Japanese field hockey player (1909–1986)

Olympic medal record

Men's field hockey
Silver medal – second place	1932 Los Angeles	Team competition

Kenichi Konishi (小西 健一, Konishi Ken'ichi; March 20, 1909 – March 20, 1986) was a Japanese field hockey player who competed in the 1932 Summer Olympics. He was born in Hamhung, Korea. In 1932 he was a member of the Japanese field hockey team which won the silver medal. He played two matches as forward.
