= James Blair (rower) =

American rower

Olympic medal record

Men's rowing

Representing the United States
Gold medal – first place	1932 Los Angeles	Eight

James Howard Blair (October 28, 1909 – May 23, 1992) was an American rower who competed in the 1932 Summer Olympics.

In 1932, he won the gold medal as member of the American boat in the eights competition.
