= Harry Fry (rower) =

Canadian rower (1905–1985)

Medal record

Men's rowing

Olympic Games
Bronze medal – third place	1932 Los Angeles	Eight

British Empire Games
Bronze medal – third place	1930 Hamilton	Eight

Harry Brittain Fry (September 13, 1905 – 1985) was a Canadian rower who competed in the 1932 Summer Olympics and in the 1936 Summer Olympics. He was a member of the men's heavy eights crew from Leander Boat Club of Ontario which won the Canadian Olympic trials in 1932, and went on to win the bronze medal at the Los Angeles Olympics.

At the 1930 Empire Games he won the bronze medal with the Canadian boat in the eights competition. In 1932 he was a crew member of the Canadian boat which won the bronze medal in the Olympic eights event. Four years later he was eliminated with the Canadian boat in the repêchage of the 1936 eights competition.

Fry was born and died in Dundas, Ontario.
