= Guglielmo Segato =

Italian cyclist (1906–1979)

Personal information
- Born: 23 March 1906 Piazzola sul Brenta, Kingdom of Italy
- Died: 19 July 1979 (aged 73) Motta di Livenza, Italy

Cycling career
- Sport: Cycling
Medal record
Representing Italy
Men's cycling
Olympic Games
Gold medal – first place	1932 Los Angeles	team road race
Silver medal – second place	1932 Los Angeles	individual road race

Guglielmo Segato (23 March 1906 – 19 July 1979) was an Italian cyclist who competed in the 1932 Summer Olympics. He won a gold medal in the team road race and a silver in the individual event.
