= Jerzy Braun (rower) =

Polish rower (1911–1968)

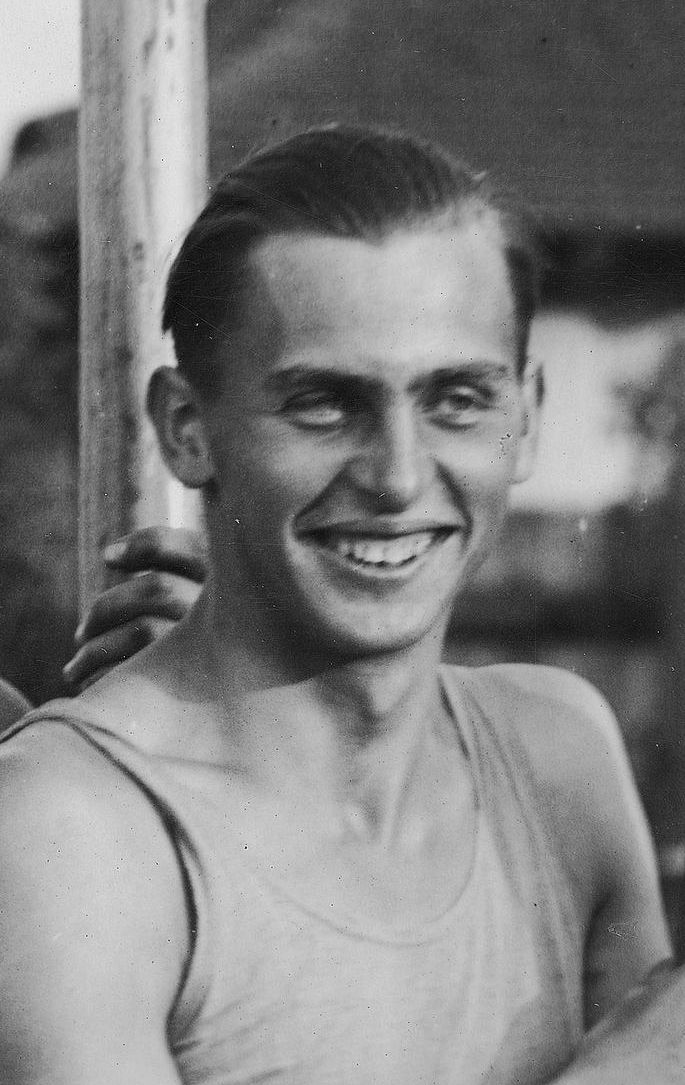
- Braun in 1932

Personal information
- Born: Jerzy Walerian Braun; 13 April 1911 Bromberg, Western Prussia, German Empire
- Died: 8 March 1968 (aged 56) Crawley, United Kingdom
- Height: 187 cm (6 ft 2 in)
- Weight: 90 kg (198 lb)

Sport
- Sport: Rowing
- Club: BTW, Bydgoszcz; WTW, Warszawa
Medal record
Men's rowing
Representing Poland
Olympic Games
Silver medal – second place	1932 Los Angeles	Coxed pair
Bronze medal – third place	1932 Los Angeles	Coxed four
European Rowing Championships
Bronze medal – third place	1929 Bydgoszcz	Coxless four
Silver medal – second place	1933 Budapest	Coxed pair

Jerzy Walerian Braun (13 April 1911 – 8 March 1968) was a Polish rower who competed in the 1932 Summer Olympics and in the 1936 Summer Olympics.

Braun was born in Bromberg in Western Prussia in 1911; the town was renamed Bydgoszcz when it became part of Poland.

He won the silver medal as member of the Polish boat in the coxed pairs competition as well as the bronze medal as member of the Polish boat in the coxed fours competition. Four years later he was part of the Polish boat which was eliminated in the repechage of the coxed pair event.

During World War II he fought in the Polish Armed Forces in the West as an officer in the Second Polish Army Corps. After the war Braun moved to England where he died aged 56 on 8 March 1968 at Crawley, he is buried at Snell Hatch Cemetery in West Green.
