= Burton Jastram =

American rower (1910–1995)

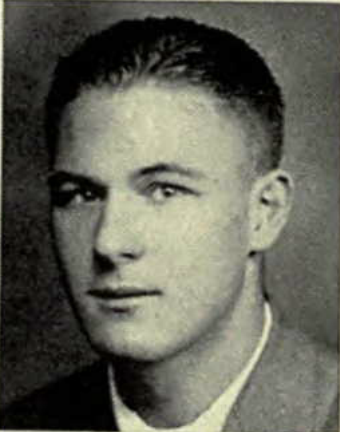
- Yearbook photo published online by ancestry.com as public domain, April 4, 2013.

Medal record

Men's rowing

Representing the United States

Olympic Games
Gold medal – first place	1932 Los Angeles	Men's eight

Burton Albert Jastram (June 5, 1910 – May 20, 1995) was an American rower who competed in the 1932 Summer Olympics and won the Gold Medal as a member of the American boat in the Eights Competition at the Long Beach Marine Stadium, beating the Italian crew from the University of Pisa by inches. Jastram won 1st Place in Eight Oared Shell - 6m. 6s. in the final tryouts at Worcester, MA held by The American Olympic Committee to select a team to represent the United States of America at the games of the X Olympiad Los Angeles, California 1932.

== Personal life ==
Burt Jastram was the son of Burton Albert Jastram Sr. and Alma Marie Smith of Lakeshore Avenue in Oakland and grandson of German immigrants, Joachim Christian Ludwig Jastram and Sophia Mernitz. He was born in San Francisco and raised as an only child. "Iron Man" Jastram, a graduate of Oakland High School, rowed in the No. 4 position and set the crew record of having more hours in the California university shell than any other oarsman at the time.

He graduated from the University of California, Berkeley with a degree in architecture and a seat on the United States' Olympic rowing crew. After winning his Olympic Gold Medal he did post-graduate work in Engineering and began a career with Standard Oil of California.

Jastram was Chief Architect with Standard Oil and supervised construction of the company's towers—one 20- and one 40-story building, as well as a garden plaza on Market Street in San Francisco.

On June 9, 1935, Jastram married Frances Wanless Christie. A daughter, Cathy Ann, was born to the couple on July 24, 1942.

Jastram belonged to the Museum Societies of both San Francisco and Oakland, Delta Sigma Chi Architectural Honor Society, National Trust for Historic Preservation, The Big "C" Society, and was a life member of the Mechanics' Institutes.
