= Bruno Parovel =

Italian rower (1913–1994)

Medal record

Men's rowing

Representing Italy

Olympic Games
Silver medal – second place	1932 Los Angeles	Coxed four

Bruno Francesco Parovel (6 October 1913 – 18 December 1994) was an Italian rower who competed in the 1932 Summer Olympics. In 1932, he won the silver medal as a member of the Italian boat in the coxed fours competition. He was born in Koper, Austria-Hungary.
