= José de Campos =

Brazilian rower

Personal information
- Born: 19 March 1908 Rio de Janeiro, Brazil
- Died: 31 January 1984 (aged 75)

Sport
- Sport: Rowing

José de Campos (19 March 1908 – 31 January 1984) was a Brazilian rower. He competed at the 1932 Summer Olympics and the 1936 Summer Olympics.
