= Domenico Matteucci =

Italian sport shooter

Personal information
- Born: 1 March 1895 Ravenna, Italy
- Died: 19 July 1976 (aged 81) Ravenna, Italy

Sport
- Sport: Sports shooting
Medal record
Men's shooting
Representing Italy
Olympic Games
Bronze medal – third place	1932 Los Angeles	25 m rapid fire pistol

Domenico Matteucci (1 March 1895 – 19 July 1976) was an Italian pistol sports shooter who competed in the 1932 Summer Olympics. In 1932 he won the bronze medal in the 25 metre rapid fire pistol event.
