= Norris Graham =

American rower

Medal record

Men's rowing

Representing the United States

Olympic Games
Gold medal – first place	1932 Los Angeles	Men's eight

Norris "Norey" James Graham (January 25, 1906 – July 9, 1980) was an American rower, born in Portland, Oregon, who competed in the 1932 Summer Olympics.

In 1932, he won the gold medal as coxswain of the American boat in the eights competition.
