= Giancarlo Cornaggia-Medici =

Italian fencer (1904–1970)

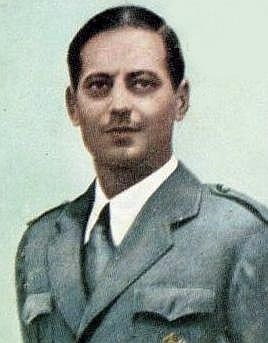

Personal information
- Born: 16 December 1904 Milan, Italy
- Died: 23 November 1970 (aged 65) Milan, Italy
Medal record
Representing Italy
Men's Fencing
Olympic Games
Gold medal – first place	1928 Amsterdam	Épée Team
Gold medal – first place	1932 Los Angeles	Épée Individual
Gold medal – first place	1936 Berlin	Épée Team
Silver medal – second place	1932 Los Angeles	Épée Team
Bronze medal – third place	1936 Berlin	Épée Individual

Giancarlo Cornaggia-Medici (16 December 1904 – 23 November 1970) was an Italian fencer and Olympic champion in épée competition.

He received a gold medal in épée individual at the 1932 Summer Olympics in Los Angeles. He received a gold medal in épée team in 1928 and in 1936, and a silver medal in 1932.
