= Stanley Stanyar =

Canadian rower

Olympic medal record

Men's rowing

Representing Canada
Bronze medal – third place	1932 Los Angeles	Eight

Stanley B. Stanyar (December 29, 1905 – June 5, 1983) was a Canadian rower who competed in the 1932 Summer Olympics.

In 1932, he won the bronze medal as member of the Canadian boat in the eights competition.
