= Katsumi Shibata =

Japanese field hockey player

Olympic medal record

Men's field hockey
Silver medal – second place	1932 Los Angeles	Team competition

Katsumi Shibata (Japanese: 柴田 勝巳, 1909 – August 1942) was a Japanese field hockey player who competed in the 1932 Summer Olympics. In 1932 he was a member of the Japanese field hockey team, which won the silver medal. He played two matches as halfback. He was born in Tokyo, Japan and was killed in action during World War II.
