= Yoshio Sakai =

Japanese field hockey player

Olympic medal record

Men's field hockey
Silver medal – second place	1932 Los Angeles	Team competition

Yoshio Sakai (Japanese: 酒井義雄, born May 2, 1910 – ?) was a Japanese field hockey player who competed in the 1932 Summer Olympics and in the 1936 Summer Olympics.

In 1932 he was a member of the Japanese field hockey team, which won the silver medal.

In the 1936 tournament he played all three matches as halfback for the Japanese field hockey team, when they were eliminated after the group stage.

He was born in Tokyo, Japan.
