= Hiroshi Nagata =

Japanese field hockey player

Olympic medal record

Men's field hockey
| Silver medal – second place | 1932 Los Angeles | Team competition |

Hiroshi Nagata (Japanese: 永田 寛, 30 August 1907 – 4 August 1961) was a Japanese field hockey player who competed in the 1932 Summer Olympics. He was born in Hiroshima Prefecture, Japan. In 1932 he was a member of the Japanese field hockey team, which won the silver medal. He played two matches as forward.
