= William Thoburn (rower) =

Canadian rower

Medal record

Men's Rowing

Olympic Games
Bronze medal – third place	1932 Los Angeles	Eights

British Empire Games
Bronze medal – third place	1930 Hamilton	Eights

William Thoburn (December 3, 1906 – June 20, 1997) was a Canadian rower who competed in the 1932 Summer Olympics. He was born in Dundas, Ontario. In 1932 he was a crew member of the Canadian boat which won the bronze medal in the Olympic eights event. At the 1930 Empire Games he won the bronze medal with the Canadian boat in the eights competition.
