= Earl Eastwood =

Canadian rower (1905–1968)

Medal record

Men's Rowing

Olympic Games
| Bronze medal – third place | 1932 Los Angeles | Eights |

British Empire Games
| Bronze medal – third place | 1930 Hamilton | Eights |

Earl Hamilton Richard Eastwood (November 2, 1905 – July 4, 1968) was a Canadian rower who competed in the 1932 Summer Olympics.

He was born in Hamilton, Ontario.

In 1932 he was a crew member of the Canadian boat which won the bronze medal in the eights event.

At the 1930 Empire Games he won the bronze medal with the Canadian boat in the eights competition.
