= Sadayoshi Kobayashi =

Japanese field hockey player

Olympic medal record

Men's field hockey
Silver medal – second place	1932 Los Angeles	Team competition

Sadayoshi Kobayashi (Japanese: 小林 定義; February 14, 1905 – May 23, 1997) was a Japanese field hockey player who competed in the 1932 Summer Olympics.

In 1932 he was a member of the Japanese field hockey team, which won the silver medal. He played two matches as back.

He was born in Kanagawa Prefecture, Japan.
