= Eiichi Nakamura (field hockey) =

Japanese field hockey player

Olympic medal record

Men's field hockey
Silver medal – second place	1932 Los Angeles	Team competition

Eiichi Nakamura (Japanese: 中村 英一, Nakamura Eiichi; 1909 – 27 May 1945) was a Japanese athlete and field hockey player from Kyoto Prefecture. Nakamura is best known for competing in the 1932 Summer Olympics.

Nakamura was a member of the Japanese field hockey team, which won the silver medal at the 1932 Summer Olympics in Los Angeles, California.

He was killed in action during World War II.
