= Edwin Salisbury =

American rower (1910–1986)

Medal record

Men's rowing

Representing the United States

Olympic Games
Gold medal – first place	1932 Los Angeles	Eight

Edwin Lyle Salisbury (May 31, 1910 – November 22, 1986) was an American rower who competed in the 1932 Summer Olympics.

Salisbury was born in California. In 1932, he won the gold medal as member of the University of California, Berkeley team, which competed for the US in the eights competition. In 1969 the team and its members were entered into the National Rowing Foundation's Rowing Hall of Fame.

Salisbury died in Sacramento at the age of 76.
