= Antonio Garzoni Provenzani =

Italian rower (1906–1989)

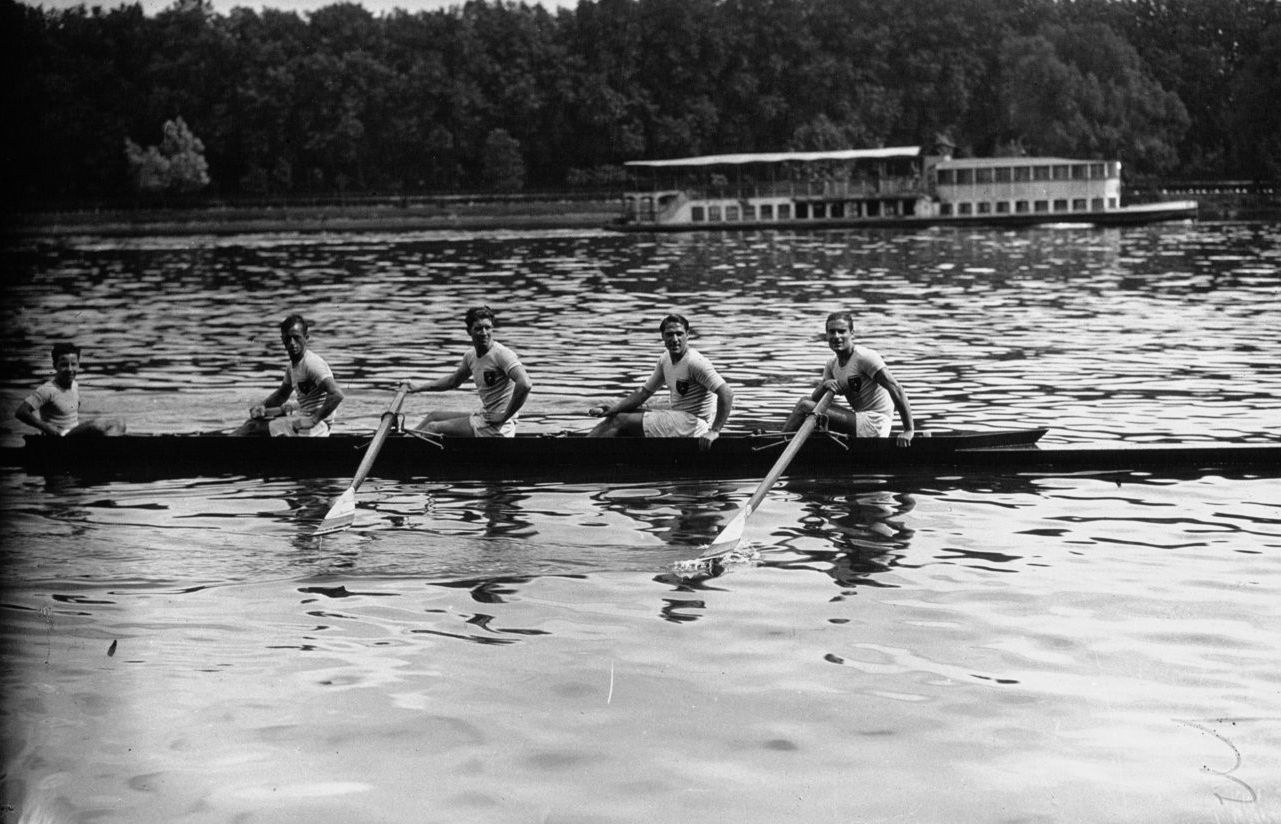
- The winning coxed four at the 1931 European Rowing Championships

Personal information
- Born: 2 December 1906 Rome, Italy
- Died: 15 February 1989 (aged 82) Rome, Italy
- Height: 167 cm (5 ft 6 in)

Sport
- Sport: Rowing
- Club: CC Aniene
Medal record
Men's rowing
Representing Hungary
Olympic Games
Bronze medal – third place	1932 Los Angeles	Coxless four
European Rowing Championships
Gold medal – first place	1931 Paris	Coxed four
Bronze medal – third place	1934 Lucerne	Eight

Antonio Garzoni Provenzani (2 December 1906 in Rome – 15 February 1989) was an Italian rower who competed in the 1932 Summer Olympics.

In 1932 he won the bronze medal as member of the Italian boat in the coxless four competition.
