= Antonio Ghiardello =

Italian rower (1898–1992)

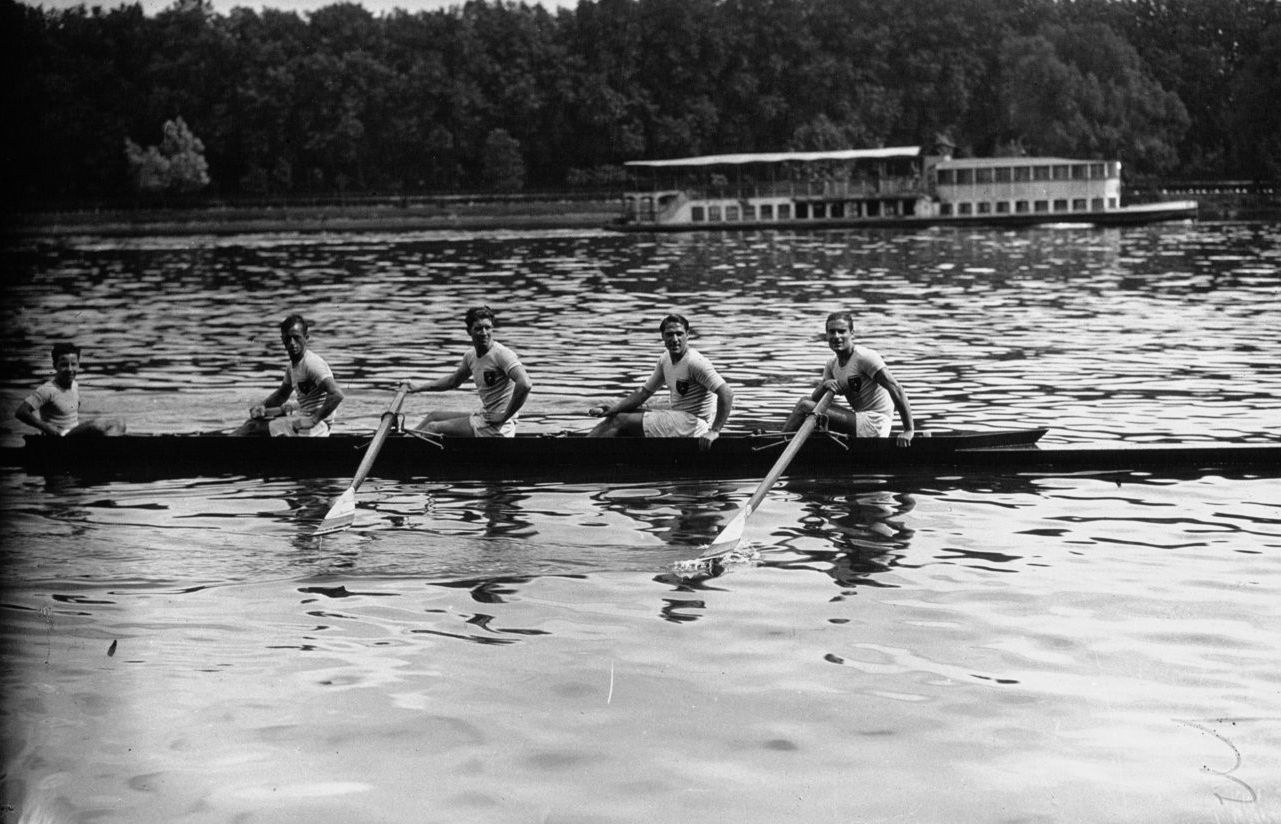
- The winning coxed four at the 1931 European Rowing Championships

Personal information
- Born: 21 April 1898 Santa Margherita Ligure, Italy
- Died: 4 January 1992 (aged 93)

Sport
- Sport: Rowing
- Club: CC Aniene
Medal record
Men's rowing
Representing Italy
Olympic Games
| Bronze medal – third place | 1932 Los Angeles | Coxless four |
European Rowing Championships
| Gold medal – first place | 1926 Lucerne | Coxed four |
| Gold medal – first place | 1927 Como | Coxed four |
| Gold medal – first place | 1931 Paris | Coxed four |
| Bronze medal – third place | 1934 Lucerne | Eight |

Antonio Ghiardello (21 April 1898 – 4 January 1992) was an Italian rower who competed in the 1932 Summer Olympics and in the 1936 Summer Olympics.

Ghiardello missed the Italian trials in 1928 due to appendicitis and could therefore not qualify for the 1928 Summer Olympics. In 1932 he won the bronze medal as member of the Italian boat in the coxless four competition. Four years later he finished fourth as part of the Italian boat in the coxless four event.
