= Renato Bracci =

Italian rower (1904–1975)

Personal information
- Born: 8 September 1904 Livorno, Italy
- Died: 2 March 1975 (aged 70) Livorno, Italy
- Height: 173 cm (5 ft 8 in)

Sport
- Sport: Rowing
- Club: U.C. Livornesi, Livorno
Medal record
Men's rowing
Representing Italy
Olympic Games
Silver medal – second place	1932 Los Angeles	Eight
European Rowing Championships
Silver medal – second place	1931 Paris	Eight
Silver medal – second place	1933 Budapest	Eight

Renato Bracci (8 September 1904 in Livorno – 2 March 1975) was an Italian rower who competed in the 1932 Summer Olympics.

In 1932 he won the silver medal as member of the Italian boat in the men's eight competition.
