= Francesco Cossu =

Italian rower

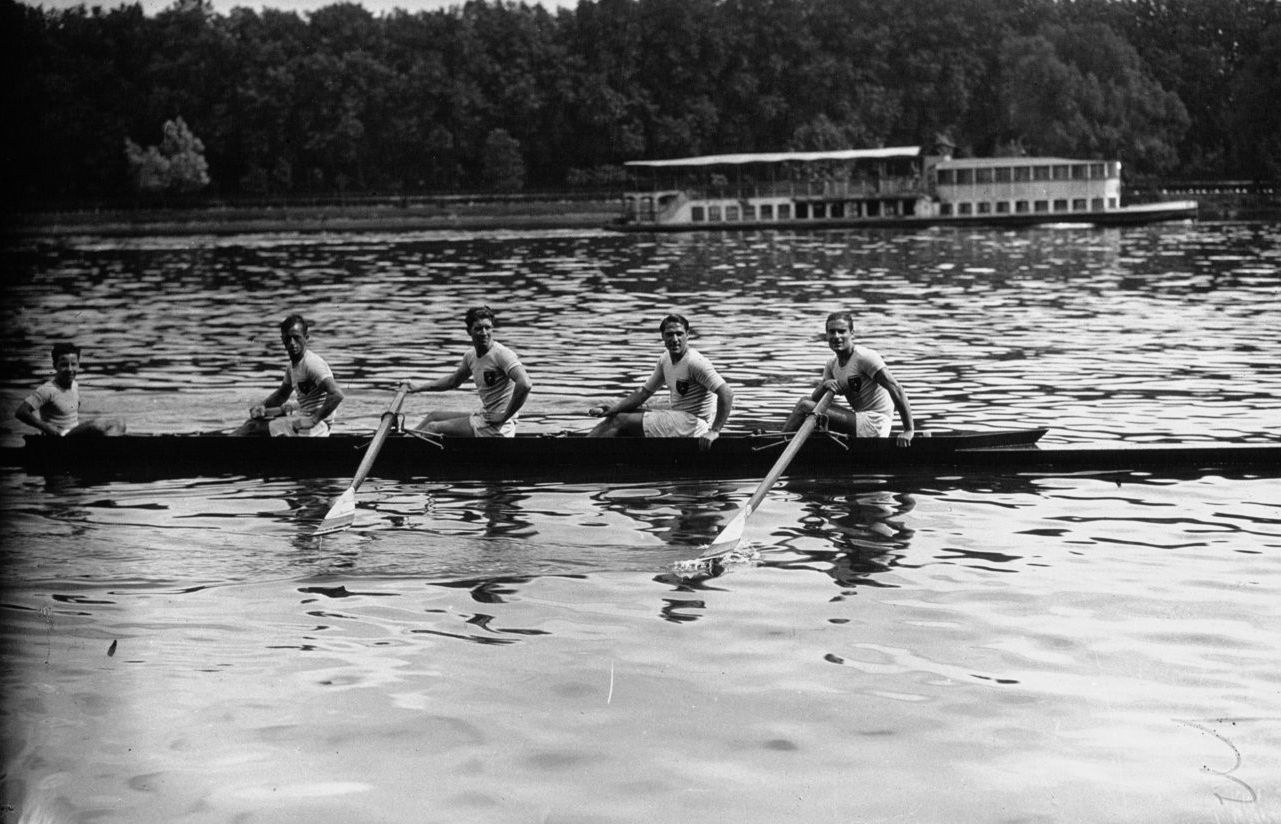
- The winning coxed four at the 1931 European Rowing Championships

Personal information
- Born: 11 January 1907 Rome, Kingdom of Italy
- Died: 4 November 1986 (aged 79) Rome, Italy

Sport
- Sport: Rowing
- Club: CC Aniene
Medal record
Men's rowing
Representing Italy
Olympic Games
Bronze medal – third place	1932 Los Angeles	Coxless four
European Rowing Championships
Gold medal – first place	1931 Paris	Coxed four

Francesco Cossu (11 January 1907 – 4 November 1986) was an Italian rower who competed in the 1932 Summer Olympics. In 1932 he won the bronze medal as member of the Italian boat in the coxless four competition.
