= Cesare Milani =

Italian rower

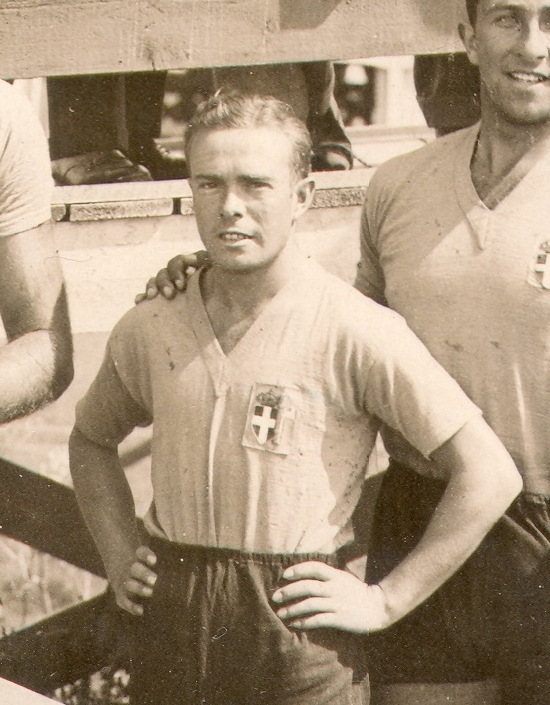
- Cesare Milani (1928)

Personal information
- Born: 4 January 1905 Livorno, Italy
- Died: 21 June 1956 (aged 51)
- Height: 170 cm (5 ft 7 in)

Sport
- Sport: Rowing
- Club: U.C. Livornesi, Livorno
Medal record
Men's rowing
Representing Italy
Olympic Games
Silver medal – second place	1932 Los Angeles	Eight
Silver medal – second place	1936 Berlin	Eight
European Rowing Championships
Silver medal – second place	1926 Lucerne	Coxed pair
Gold medal – first place	1927 Como	Coxed pair
Gold medal – first place	1929 Bydgoszcz	Coxed pair
Gold medal – first place	1929 Bydgoszcz	Eight
Silver medal – second place	1930 Liège	Eight
Silver medal – second place	1931 Paris	Eight
Silver medal – second place	1933 Budapest	Eight
Gold medal – first place	1937 Amsterdam	Eight
Bronze medal – third place	1938 Milan	Eight

Cesare Milani (4 January 1905 – 21 June 1956) was an Italian rowing coxswain who competed in the 1928 Summer Olympics, in the 1932 Summer Olympics, and in the 1936 Summer Olympics.

In 1928 he coxed the Italian boat which was eliminated in the quarter-finals of the coxed pair event. Four years later he won the silver medal as coxswain of the Italian boat in the men's eight competition. In 1936 he won his second silver medal as the coxswain of the Italian boat in the men's eight event.
