= Guglielmo Del Bimbo =

Italian rower

Personal information
- Born: 20 November 1903 Livorno, Italy
- Died: 3 November 1973 (aged 69)
- Height: 173 cm (5 ft 8 in)

Sport
- Sport: Rowing
- Club: U.C. Livornesi, Livorno
Medal record
Men's rowing
Representing Italy
Olympic Games
Silver medal – second place	1932 Los Angeles	Eight
Silver medal – second place	1936 Berlin	Eight
European Rowing Championships
Gold medal – first place	1929 Bydgoszcz	Eight
Silver medal – second place	1930 Liège	Eight
Silver medal – second place	1931 Paris	Eight
Silver medal – second place	1933 Budapest	Eight

Guglielmo Del Bimbo (20 November 1903 – 3 November 1973) was an Italian rower who competed in the 1932 Summer Olympics and in the 1936 Summer Olympics.

He was born in Livorno. In 1932 he won the silver medal as member of the Italian boat in the men's eight competition. Four years later he won his second silver medal as part of the Italian boat in the eight event.
