= Giliante D'Este =

Italian rower

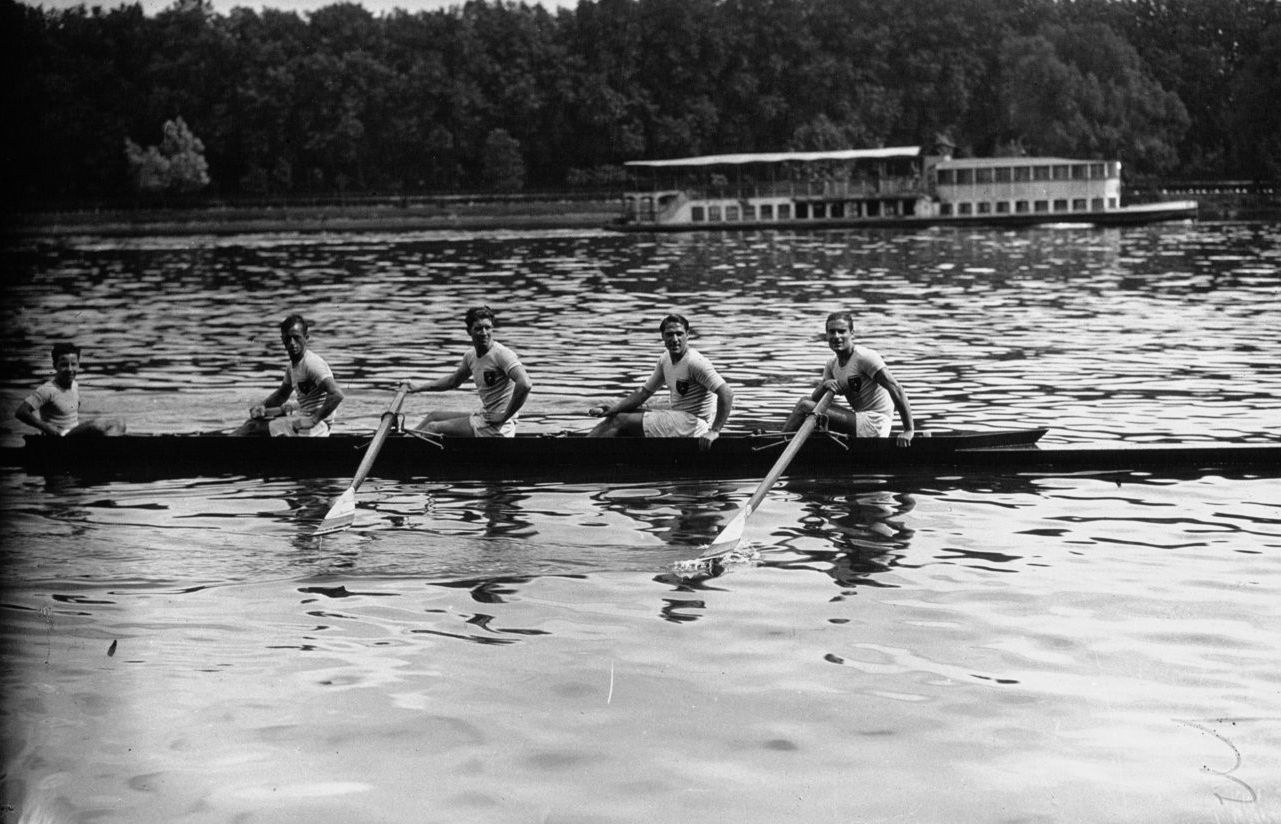
- The winning coxed four at the 1931 European Rowing Championships

Personal information
- Born: 23 March 1910 Izola, Austrian Empire
- Died: 24 April 1996 (aged 86) Rome, Italy
- Height: 170 cm (5 ft 7 in)

Sport
- Sport: Rowing
- Club: SN Pullino, Izola (SLO); CC Aniene, Rome
Medal record
Men's rowing
Representing Italy
Olympic Games
Gold medal – first place	1928 Amsterdam	Coxed four
Bronze medal – third place	1932 Los Angeles	Coxless four
European Rowing Championships
Gold medal – first place	1929 Bydgoszcz	Coxed four
Gold medal – first place	1931 Paris	Coxed four

Giliante D'Este (23 March 1910 – 24 April 1996) was an Italian rower who competed in the 1928 Summer Olympics, in the 1932 Summer Olympics, and in the 1936 Summer Olympics.

In 1928 he won the gold medal as a member of the Italian boat in the coxed four event. Four years later he won the bronze medal with the Italian boat in the coxless four event. In 1936 he was part of the Italian boat which was eliminated in the repechage of the coxed four competition.
