= Vittorio Cioni =

Italian rower (1900–1981)

Personal information
- Born: 12 October 1900 Pisa, Italy
- Died: 29 September 1981 (aged 80)
- Height: 170 cm (5 ft 7 in)

Sport
- Sport: Rowing
- Club: U.C. Livornesi, Livorno
Medal record
Men's rowing
Representing Italy
Olympic Games
| Silver medal – second place | 1932 Los Angeles | Eight |
European Rowing Championships
| Gold medal – first place | 1929 Bydgoszcz | Eight |
| Silver medal – second place | 1930 Liège | Eight |
| Silver medal – second place | 1931 Paris | Eight |

Vittorio Cioni (12 October 1900 in Pisa – 29 September 1981) was an Italian rower who competed in the 1932 Summer Olympics.

In 1932 he won the silver medal as member of the Italian boat in the men's eight competition.
