= Junzo Inohara =

Japanese field hockey player

Olympic medal record

Men's field hockey
Silver medal – second place	1932 Los Angeles	Team competition

Junzo Inohara (猪原 淳三, Inohara Junzō) (born January 31, 1910, date of death unknown) was a Japanese field hockey player who competed in the 1932 Summer Olympics. In 1932 he was a member of the Japanese field hockey team, which won the silver medal. He played two matches as forward. He was born in Hiroshima Prefecture, Japan.
