= Guerrino Scher =

Italian rower (1915–1992)

Medal record

Men's rowing

Representing Italy

Olympic Games
Silver medal – second place	1932 Los Angeles	Coxed four

Guerrino Giovanni Antonio Scher (21 October 1915 – 22 January 1992), also spelled Scherl, was an Italian rower who competed in the 1932 Summer Olympics. In 1932 he won the silver medal as coxswain of the Italian boat in the coxed fours competition. He was born in Koper, Austria-Hungary.
