= Cyril Stiles =

New Zealand rower

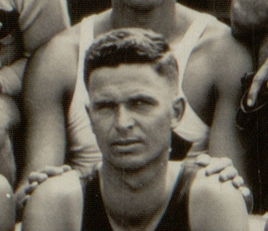
Medal record
Men's rowing
Representing New Zealand
Olympic Games
Silver medal – second place	1932 Los Angeles	Coxless pair
British Empire Games
Bronze medal – third place	1938 Sydney	Eight

Cyril Alec "Bob" Stiles (10 October 1904 – 5 March 1985) was a New Zealand rower. He won a silver medal at the 1932 Summer Olympics in Los Angeles in the coxless pairs with partner Rangi Thompson. He also won a bronze medal at the 1938 British Empire Games in Sydney in the eights.

Stiles Place, a Christchurch street, is named after Stiles. The street runs off Arnst Place, named after Richard Arnst, another New Zealand rower. Both are near a part of the Avon River used by rowers, locally known as Kerr's Reach.
