= Giovanni Plazzer =

Italian rower

Olympic medal record

Men's rowing
Silver medal – second place	1932 Los Angeles	Coxed four

Giovanni Plazzer (30 September 1909 in Koper, Austria-Hungary – 23 June 1983) was an Italian rower. He was a member of the silver medallion Italian coxed fours boat in the 1932 Summer Olympics.
