= Riccardo Divora =

Italian rower (1908–1951)

Medal record

Men's rowing

Representing Italy

Olympic Games
Silver medal – second place	1932 Los Angeles	Coxed four

Riccardo Antonio Giovanni Divora (22 December 1908 – 10 January 1951) was an Italian rower who competed in the 1932 Summer Olympics.

In 1932 he won the silver medal as a member of the Italian boat in the coxed fours competition.
