= Renato Barbieri =

Italian rower (1903–1980)

Personal information
- Born: 15 January 1903 Livorno, Italy
- Died: 11 November 1980 (aged 77) Livorno, Italy
- Height: 170 cm (5 ft 7 in)

Sport
- Sport: Rowing
- Club: U.C. Livornesi, Livorno
Medal record
Men's rowing
Representing Italy
Olympic Games
Silver medal – second place	1932 Los Angeles	Eight
European Rowing Championships
Gold medal – first place	1929 Bydgoszcz	Eight
Silver medal – second place	1930 Liège	Eight
Silver medal – second place	1931 Paris	Eight
Silver medal – second place	1933 Budapest	Eight

Renato Barbieri (15 January 1903 – 11 November 1980), also known as Attào, was an Italian rower who competed in the 1932 Summer Olympics.

In 1932 he won the silver medal as member of the Italian boat in the men's eight competition.
