= Bruno Vattovaz =

Italian rower

Olympic medal record

Men's rowing
Silver medal – second place	1932 Los Angeles	Coxed four

Bruno Vattovaz (20 February 1912 in Koper, Austria-Hungary – 5 October 1943) was an Italian rower who competed in the 1932 Summer Olympics.

In 1932, he won the silver medal as a member of the Italian boat in the coxed fours competition.
