= Fencing at the 1928 Summer Olympics – Men's team sabre =

Men's team sabre at the Games of the IX Olympiad
- Venue: Schermzaal
- Dates: 8-9 August 1928
- Competitors: 65 from 12 nations

Medalists
1st place, gold medalist(s)		Ödön von Tersztyánszky, János Garay, Attila Petschauer, József Rády, Sándor Gombos, Gyula Glykais	Hungary
2nd place, silver medalist(s)		Bino Bini, Oreste Puliti, Giulio Sarrocchi, Renato Anselmi, Emilio Salafia, Gustavo Marzi	Italy
3rd place, bronze medalist(s)		Adam Papée, Tadeusz Friedrich, Kazimierz Laskowski, Władysław Segda, Aleksander Małecki, Jerzy Zabielski	Poland

The men's team sabre was one of seven fencing events on the Fencing at the 1928 Summer Olympics programme. It was the fifth appearance of the event. The competition was held from 8 August 1928 to 9 August 1928. 65 fencers from 12 nations competed.

== Rosters ==
Belgium

- Modeste Cuypers
- Jacques Kesteloot
- Édouard Yves
- Gaston Kaanen

Chile

- Jorge Garretón
- Abelardo Castro
- Tomás Goyoaga
- Oscar Novoa
- Efrain Díaz
- Nemoroso Riquelme

France

- Raoul Fristeau
- Roger Ducret
- Jean Lacroix
- Maurice Taillandier
- Jean Piot
- Paul Oziol de Pignol

Germany

- Erwin Casmir
- Heinrich Moos
- Hans Halberstadt
- Hans Thomson

Great Britain

- Edward Brookfield
- Archie Corble
- Alex Forrest
- Guy Harry
- Robin Jeffreys
- Barry Notley

Greece

- Konstantinos Botasis
- Georgios Ambet
- Tryfon Triantafyllakos
- Konstantinos Nikolopoulos

Hungary

- Ödön von Tersztyánszky
- János Garay
- Attila Petschauer
- József Rády
- Sándor Gombos
- Gyula Glykais

Italy

- Bino Bini
- Oreste Puliti
- Giulio Sarrocchi
- Renato Anselmi
- Emilio Salafia
- Gustavo Marzi

Netherlands

- Cornelis Ekkart
- Hendrik Hagens
- Maarten van Dulm
- Jan van der Wiel
- Arie de Jong
- Henri Wijnoldy-Daniëls

Poland

- Adam Papée
- Tadeusz Friedrich
- Kazimierz Laskowski
- Władysław Segda
- Aleksander Małecki
- Jerzy Zabielski

Turkey

- Muhuttin Okyavuz
- Fuat Balkan
- Nami Yayak
- Enver Balkan

United States

- Ervin Acel
- Norman Cohn-Armitage
- John Huffman
- Arthur Lyon
- Nickolas Muray
- Harold Van Buskirk

== Results ==
Source: Official results; De Wael

=== Round 1 ===
Each pool was a round-robin (with matches not being held where unnecessary to the overall result). Bouts were to five touches, and each fencer from one nation had a bout against each from the opponent. The nation which won the most individual bouts took the team bout (with total touches as the tie-breaker if the teams split 8-8). The top two nations in each pool advanced to the semifinals.

Pool A
Rank	Nation	Wins	Losses	Qual.
1	France	1	0	Q
1	Italy	1	0	Q
3	Greece	0	2	

Pool B
Rank	Nation	Wins	Losses	Qual.
1	Hungary	2	0	Q
1	Poland	2	0	Q
3	Great Britain	0	2	
3	United States	0	2	

Pool C
Rank	Nation	Wins	Losses	Qual.
1	Netherlands	1	0	Q
2	Turkey	0	1	Q

Pool D
Rank	Nation	Wins	Losses	Qual.
1	Belgium	1	0	Q
1	Germany	1	0	Q
3	Chile	0	2	

=== Semifinals ===
Each pool was a round-robin (with matches not being held where unnecessary to the overall result). Bouts were to five touches, and each fencer from one nation had a bout against each from the opponent. The nation which won the most individual bouts took the team bout (with total touches as the tie-breaker if the teams split 8-8). The top two nations in each pool advanced to the final.

Pool A
Rank	Nation	Wins	Losses	Qual.
1	Italy	2	0	Q
2	Poland	2	1	Q
3	Netherlands	1	2	
4	Belgium	0	2	

Pool B
Rank	Nation	Wins	Losses	Qual.
1	Hungary	2	0	Q
2	Germany	2	1	Q
3	France	1	2	
4	Turkey	0	2	

=== Final ===
The final was a round-robin. Bouts were to five touches, and each fencer from one nation had a bout against each from the opponent. The nation which won the most individual bouts took the team bout (with total touches as the tie-breaker if the teams split 8-8).

Hungary beat both Italy and Poland, which had each beaten Germany; therefore, the Hungary-Germany match was unnecessary as Hungary would win gold and Germany take fourth regardless of the results. The reason for not holding the Italy-Poland match is less clear; the official report says it was not necessary, but presumably the winner would be the silver medalist while the loser would take the bronze. Italy had defeated Poland 16-0 in the semifinals, which may have been how the final placing was decided.

Rank	Nation	Wins	Losses
1st place, gold medalist(s)	Hungary	2	0
2nd place, silver medalist(s)	Italy	1	1
3rd place, bronze medalist(s)	Poland	1	1
4	Germany	0	2
