= Fencing at the 1932 Summer Olympics – Men's team sabre =

Men's team sabre at the Games of the X Olympiad
- Venue: 160th Regiment State Armory
- Dates: 10–11 August 1932
- Competitors: 32 from 6 nations

Medalists
1st place, gold medalist(s)		Attila Petschauer, Ernő Nagy, Gyula Glykais, György Piller-Jekelfalussy, Aladár Gerevich, Endre Kabos	Hungary
2nd place, silver medalist(s)		Gustavo Marzi, Giulio Gaudini, Renato Anselmi, Emilio Salafia, Arturo De Vecchi, Ugo Pignotti	Italy
3rd place, bronze medalist(s)		Tadeusz Friedrich, Marian Suski, Władysław Dobrowolski, Władysław Segda, Adam Papée, Leszek Lubicz-Nycz	Poland

The men's team sabre was one of seven fencing events on the fencing at the 1932 Summer Olympics programme. It was the sixth appearance of the event. The competition was held from 10 August 1932 to 11 August 1932. 32 fencers from six nations competed. Each team could have a maximum of six fencers, with four participating in any given match. France and Cuba entered, but withdrew before competition.

The competition format continued the pool play round-robin from prior years. Each of the four fencers from one team would face each of the four from the other, for a total of 16 bouts per match (with bouts unnecessary to determining the match winner sometimes not being played). The team that won more bouts won the match. Matches not necessary to determining qualification were not played.

== Rosters ==
Denmark

- Ivan Osiier
- Erik Kofoed-Hansen
- Aage Leidersdorff
- Axel Bloch

Hungary

- Attila Petschauer
- Ernő Nagy
- Gyula Glykais
- György Piller-Jekelfalussy
- Aladár Gerevich
- Endre Kabos

Italy

- Gustavo Marzi
- Giulio Gaudini
- Renato Anselmi
- Emilio Salafia
- Arturo De Vecchi
- Ugo Pignotti

Mexico

- Antonio Haro
- Francisco Valero
- Gerónimo Delgadillo
- Nicolás Reyero

Poland

- Tadeusz Friedrich
- Marian Suski
- Władysław Dobrowolski
- Władysław Segda
- Adam Papée
- Leszek Lubicz-Nycz

United States

- Peter Bruder
- John Huffman
- Norman Cohn-Armitage
- Nickolas Muray
- Harold Van Buskirk
- Ralph Faulkner

== Results ==
=== Round 1 ===
The top two teams in each pool advanced to the final. Cuba and France both withdrew, leaving the first pool with only two teams–automatically advancing both.

==== Pool 1 ====
Rank	Country	MW	ML	BW	BL	Notes
1	Italy	0	0	0	0	Q
1	United States	0	0	0	0	Q
–	Cuba	DNS	DNS	DNS	DNS	
–	France	DNS	DNS	DNS	DNS	

==== Pool 2 ====
Rank	Country	MW	ML	BW	BL	Notes
1	Hungary	2	0	25	3	Q
2	Poland	2	0	19	11	Q
3	Denmark	0	2	6	20	
4	Mexico	0	2	8	24	

=== Final ===
Rank	Country	MW	ML	BW	BL
1st place, gold medalist(s)	Hungary	3	0	31	6
2nd place, silver medalist(s)	Italy	2	1	20	14
3rd place, bronze medalist(s)	Poland	1	2	10	26
4	United States	0	3	15	30
