= Fencing at the 1932 Summer Olympics – Men's sabre =

Olympic fencing event

Men's sabre at the Games of the X Olympiad
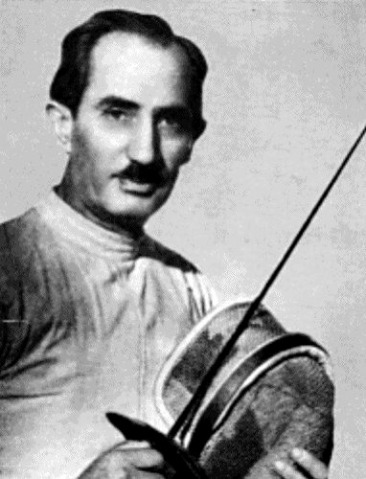
- György Piller
- Venue: 160th Regiment State Armory
- Dates: 12–13 August 1932
- Competitors: 25 from 12 nations

Medalists
1st place, gold medalist(s)		György Piller	Hungary
2nd place, silver medalist(s)		Giulio Gaudini	Italy
3rd place, bronze medalist(s)		Endre Kabos	Hungary

The men's sabre was one of seven fencing events on the fencing at the 1932 Summer Olympics programme. It was the ninth appearance of the event. The competition was held from 12 August 1932 to 13 August 1932. 25 fencers from 12 nations competed. Five additional fencers entered but did not start. Each nation was limited to three fencers. The event was won by György Piller of Hungary, the third of nine straight Games in which a Hungarian would win the event. Giulio Gaudini of Italy took silver, while another Hungarian (Endre Kabos) earned bronze.

== Background ==
This was the ninth appearance of the event, which is the only fencing event to have been held at every Summer Olympics. Three of the twelve finalists from 1928 returned: silver medalist Attila Petschauer of Hungary, sixth-place finisher Erwin Casmir of Germany, and seventh-place finisher Arturo De Vecchi of Italy. The reigning gold medalist, Ödön Tersztyánszky, had been killed in a car accident in 1929. György Piller of Hungary was the two-time reigning world champion and favored among a strong Hungarian team.

Canada, Mexico, and Poland each made their debut in the men's sabre. Italy and Denmark each made their seventh appearance in the event, tied for most of any nation, each having missed two of the first three events but having appeared every Games since 1908.

== Competition format ==
The competition format was a round-robin for each pool, with three rounds (preliminary, semifinals, and final). Bouts were to five touches. Pool placement depended on bouts won; not all bouts in a round-robin were played if unnecessary to determine qualification for the next round; Erwin Casmir, for example, fenced only three bouts rather than seven in an eight-person preliminary pool because his three wins were sufficient to put him in fourth place and qualify him for the semifinals. Touches against was typically used as a tie-breaker for placement (including breaking a tie for the bronze medal), but fence-off barrages were used to determine qualification in the semifinals.

- Quarterfinals: There were 3 pools of between 8 and 9 fencers each (after withdrawals). The top 6 fencers in each quarterfinal advanced to the semifinals.
- Semifinals: There were 2 pools of 9 fencers each. The top 5 fencers in each semifinal advanced to the final.
- Final: The final pool had 10 fencers.

== Schedule ==
Date	Time	Round
Friday, 12 August 1932	8:00; 13:00	Quarterfinals; Semifinals
Saturday, 13 August 1932	13:00	Final

== Results ==
=== Quarterfinals ===
The top six fencers in each pool qualified for the semifinals.

==== Quarterfinal 1 ====
Rank	Fencer	Nation	Wins	Losses	TS	TR	Notes
1	Attila Petschauer	Hungary	5	0	25	12	Q
2	Giulio Gaudini	Italy	5	1	29	16	Q
3	Ivan Osiier	Denmark	3	2	21	17	Q
4	Jean Piot	France	3	3	21	20	Q
5	Peter Bruder	United States	3	3	26	21	Q
6	Władysław Segda	Poland	3	3	23	23	Q
7	Gerónimo Delgadillo	Mexico	1	5	12	29	
8	Patrick Farrell	Canada	0	6	11	30	
—	Barbier	Belgium	DNS				

==== Quarterfinal 2 ====
Rank	Fencer	Nation	Wins	Losses	TS	TR	Notes
1	Endre Kabos	Hungary	6	0	30	18	Q
2	Emilio Salafia	Italy	4	2	25	16	Q
3	Norman Cohn-Armitage	United States	4	2	24	18	Q
4	Erwin Casmir	Germany	3	0	15	5	Q
5	Adam Papée	Poland	3	3	22	19	Q
6	Francisco Valero	Mexico	2	5	20	29	Q
7	Axel Bloch	Denmark	1	6	12	33	
8	Georges de Bourguignon	Belgium	1	6	24	34	
—	Marzi	Italy	DNS				
—	Oziol de Pignol	France	DNS				

==== Quarterfinal 3 ====
Rank	Fencer	Nation	Wins	Losses	TS	TR	Notes
1	Edward Gardère	France	5	2	30	16	Q
2	György Piller	Hungary	5	1	26	21	Q
3	Antonio Haro	Mexico	5	3	33	28	Q
4	Arturo De Vecchi	Italy	4	2	27	17	Q
5	Leszek Lubicz-Nycz	Poland	4	2	23	22	Q
6	John Huffman	United States	4	4	34	25	Q
7	Carmelo Merlo	Argentina	1	4	20	27	
8	Doris de Jong	Netherlands	1	6	14	33	
9	Aage Leidersdorff	Denmark	1	7	19	37	
—	Mund	Belgium	DNS				
—	Anselmi	Italy	DNS				

=== Semifinals ===
The top five fencers in each semifinal advanced to the final.

Rank	Fencer	Nation	Wins	Losses	TS	TR	Notes
1	Endre Kabos	Hungary	6	1	34	20	Q
2	Attila Petschauer	Hungary	6	2	37	24	Q
3	John Huffman	United States	6	2	36	25	Q
4	Ivan Osiier	Denmark	4	3	30	24	Q
5	Arturo De Vecchi	Italy	4	4	32	31	Q
6	Edward Gardère	France	3	5	27	37	
7	Leszek Lubicz-Nycz	Poland	2	6	26	35	
8	Adam Papée	Poland	2	6	27	36	
9	Francisco Valero	Mexico	2	6	20	37	

==== Semifinal 2 ====
The three-way tie for fourth place was broken through a barrage rather than by touches against. Cohn-Armitage placed first in that barrage (fourth in the overall pool), with Salafia second (fifth overall) and Bruder third (sixth overall, and not qualified for the final). The Official Report contains no explanation why Piot, who won no bouts, was ranked higher than Haro, who won one.

Rank	Fencer	Nation	Wins	Losses	TS	TR	Notes
1	György Piller	Hungary	6	0	30	12	Q
2	Giulio Gaudini	Italy	5	1	29	19	Q
3	Erwin Casmir	Germany	4	1	23	14	Q
4	Norman Cohn-Armitage	United States	3	4	27	24	Q
5	Emilio Salafia	Italy	3	4	25	30	Q
6	Peter Bruder	United States	3	4	23	27	
7	Jean Piot	France	0	5	11	25	
8	Antonio Haro	Mexico	1	5	16	29	
9	Władysław Segda	Poland	0	1	1	5	

=== Final ===
Rank	Fencer	Nation	Wins	Losses	TS	TR
1st place, gold medalist(s)	György Piller	Hungary	8	1	42	19
2nd place, silver medalist(s)	Giulio Gaudini	Italy	7	2	39	28
3rd place, bronze medalist(s)	Endre Kabos	Hungary	5	4	36	29
4	Erwin Casmir	Germany	5	4	32	30
5	Attila Petschauer	Hungary	5	4	37	32
6	John Huffman	United States	5	4	38	35
7	Ivan Osiier	Denmark	4	5	32	35
8	Arturo De Vecchi	Italy	3	6	27	36
9	Norman Cohn-Armitage	United States	3	6	23	37
10	Emilio Salafia	Italy	0	9	20	45
