= Fencing at the 1928 Summer Olympics – Men's sabre =

Olympic fencing event

Men's sabre at the Games of the IX Olympiad
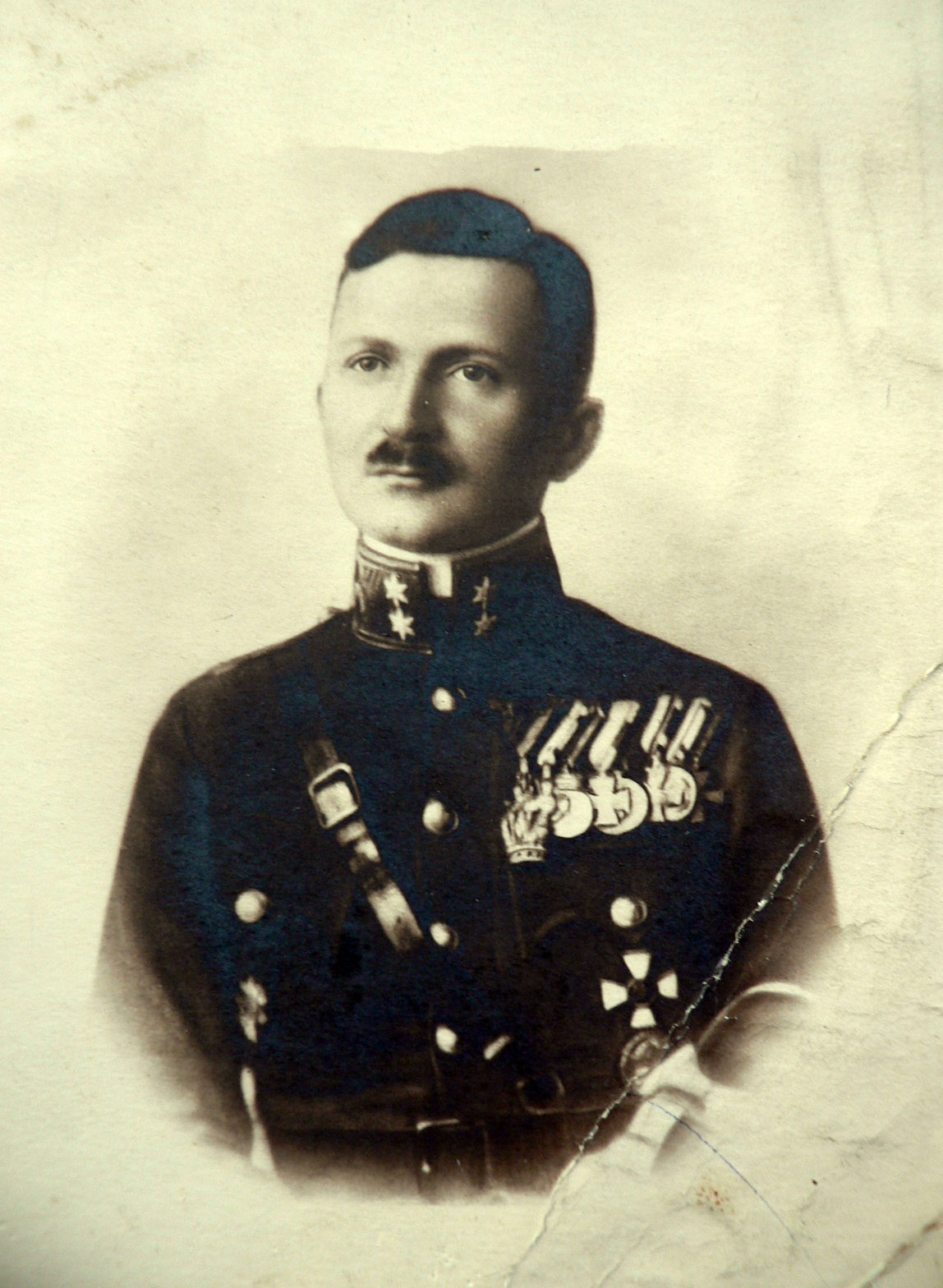
- Ödön von Tersztyánszky
- Venue: Schermzaal
- Dates: 10–11 August 1928
- Competitors: 44 from 17 nations

Medalists
1st place, gold medalist(s)		Ödön von Tersztyánszky	Hungary
2nd place, silver medalist(s)		Attila Petschauer	Hungary
3rd place, bronze medalist(s)		Bino Bini	Italy

The men's sabre was one of seven fencing events on the Fencing at the 1928 Summer Olympics programme. It was the eighth appearance of the event. The competition was held from 10 August 1928 to 11 August 1928. 44 fencers from 17 nations competed. For the third straight Games, the limit of fencers per nation was reduced (from 12 to 8 in 1920, from 8 to 4 in 1924, and from 4 to 3 in 1928). The event was won by Ödön von Tersztyánszky of Hungary, the second in a nine-Games streak of Hungarian wins. Attila Petschauer, also of Hungary, took silver. Italy's Bino Bini earned bronze.

== Background ==
This was the eighth appearance of the event, which is the only fencing event to have been held at every Summer Olympics. Four of the twelve finalists from 1924 returned: silver medalist Roger Ducret of France, fifth-place finisher Adrianus de Jong of the Netherlands, sixth-place finisher Ivan Osiier of Denmark (now in his fifth Olympics), and Bino Bini of Italy, who had withdrawn from the 1924 final after Oreste Puliti had been disqualified for threatening a judge who ruled that Bini and others had thrown matches to Puliti. The Hungarian team had experience complete turnover from 1924, but was still expected to dominate; two-time defending world champion Sándor Gombos over teammates Ödön von Tersztyánszky and Attila Petschauer.

Bulgaria, Egypt, Romania, and Yugoslavia each made their debut in the men's sabre. Italy and Denmark each made their sixth appearance in the event, tied for most of any nation.

== Competition format ==
The event used a three-round format. In each round, the fencers were divided into pools to play a round-robin within the pool. Bouts were to five touches (up from three in 1920 and four in 1924). Standard sabre rules applied.

- Quarterfinals: There were 8 pools of between 3 and 7 fencers each. The top 3 fencers in each quarterfinal advanced to the semifinals.
- Semifinals: There were 3 pools of 8 fencers each. The top 4 fencers in each semifinal advanced to the final.
- Final: The final pool had 12 fencers.

== Schedule ==
Date	Time	Round
Friday, 10 August 1928	9:00	Quarterfinals
Saturday, 11 August 1928	11:00	Semifinals; Final

== Results ==
Source: Official results; De Wael

=== Quarterfinals ===
Each pool was a round-robin. Bouts were to five touches. The top three fencers in each pool advanced to the semifinals.

==== Quarterfinal A ====
Rank	Fencer	Nation	Wins	Notes
1	Edward Brookfield	Great Britain	N/A	Q
1	Abelardo Castro	Chile	N/A	Q
1	Mohamed Charaoui	Egypt	N/A	Q

==== Quarterfinal B ====
Rank	Fencer	Nation	Wins	Notes
1	Bino Bini	Italy	4	Q
2	Ivan Osiier	Denmark	3	Q
3	Raoul Fristeau	France	3	Q
4	Hamad Niazi	Egypt	2	
5	Franjo Fröhlich	Yugoslavia	2	
6	Barry Notley	Great Britain	1	

==== Quarterfinal C ====
Rank	Fencer	Nation	Wins	Notes
1	Attila Petschauer	Hungary	5	Q
2	Roger Ducret	France	3	Q
3	Jens Berthelsen	Denmark	3	Q
4	Guy Harry	Great Britain	2	
5	Nickolas Muray	United States	1	
6	Henri Wijnoldy-Daniëls	Netherlands	1	

==== Quarterfinal D ====
Rank	Fencer	Nation	Wins	Notes
1	Adrianus de Jong	Netherlands	5	Q
2	Heinrich Moos	Germany	4	Q
3	Jean Lacroix	France	2	Q
4	Dimitar Vasilev	Bulgaria	2	
5	Viggo Stilling-Andersen	Denmark	2	
6	Nami Yayak	Turkey	0	

==== Quarterfinal E ====
Rank	Fencer	Nation	Wins	Notes
1	Jan van der Wiel	Netherlands	4	Q
2	Henri Brasseur	Belgium	2	Q
3	John Huffman	United States	2	Q
4	Isidro González	Spain	1	
5	Muhuttin Okyavuz	Turkey	1	

==== Quarterfinal F ====
Rank	Fencer	Nation	Wins	Notes
1	Sándor Gombos	Hungary	5	Q
2	Arturo De Vecchi	Italy	4	Q
3	Denis Dolecsko	Romania	2	Q
4	Édouard Yves	Belgium	2	
5	Tomás Goyoaga	Chile	2	
6	Asen Lekarski	Bulgaria	0	

==== Quarterfinal G ====
Rank	Fencer	Nation	Wins	Notes
1	Erwin Casmir	Germany	4	Q
2	Norman Cohn-Armitage	United States	3	Q
3	Jacques Kesteloot	Belgium	2	Q
4	Sigurd Akre-Aas	Norway	1	
5	Fidel González	Spain	0	

==== Quarterfinal H ====
Rank	Fencer	Nation	Wins	Notes
1	Gustavo Marzi	Italy	6	Q
2	Ödön von Tersztyánszky	Hungary	5	Q
3	Hans Thomson	Germany	4	Q
4	Mihai Raicu	Romania	2	
5	Efrain Díaz	Chile	2	
6	Juan Jesús García	Spain	2	
7	Enver Balkan	Turkey	0	

=== Semifinals ===
Each pool was a round-robin. Bouts were to five touches. The top four fencers in each pool advanced to the final.

==== Semifinal A ====
Rank	Fencer	Nation	Wins	Notes
1	Bino Bini	Italy	7	Q
2	Ödön von Tersztyánszky	Hungary	5	Q
3	Jan van der Wiel	Netherlands	5	Q
4	Roger Ducret	France	5	Q
5	Jens Berthelsen	Denmark	3	
6	Heinrich Moos	Germany	2	
7	Denis Dolecsko	Romania	1	
8	Henri Brasseur	Belgium	0	

==== Semifinal B ====
Rank	Fencer	Nation	Wins	Notes
1	Attila Petschauer	Hungary	6	Q
2	Erwin Casmir	Germany	6	Q
3	Arturo De Vecchi	Italy	6	Q
4	Jean Lacroix	France	3	Q
5	John Huffman	United States	3	
6	Edward Brookfield	Great Britain	2	
7	Mohamed Charaoui	Egypt	1	
8	Abelardo Castro	Chile	1	

==== Semifinal C ====
Rank	Fencer	Nation	Wins	Notes
1	Gustavo Marzi	Italy	6	Q
2	Hans Thomson	Germany	4	Q
3	Sándor Gombos	Hungary	4	Q
4	Adrianus de Jong	Netherlands	4	Q
5	Ivan Osiier	Denmark	3	
6	Raoul Fristeau	France	3	
7	Norman Cohn-Armitage	United States	2	
8	Jacques Kesteloot	Belgium	2	

=== Final ===
The final was a round-robin. Bouts were to five touches. A tie for first-place was broken with a single barrage bout, with von Tersztyánszky defeating Petschauer 5-2.

Rank	Fencer	Nation	Wins	Losses
1st place, gold medalist(s)	Ödön von Tersztyánszky	Hungary	9	2
2nd place, silver medalist(s)	Attila Petschauer	Hungary	9	2
3rd place, bronze medalist(s)	Bino Bini	Italy	8	3
4	Gustavo Marzi	Italy	8	3
5	Sándor Gombos	Hungary	8	3
6	Erwin Casmir	Germany	6	5
7	Arturo De Vecchi	Italy	5	6
8	Roger Ducret	France	5	6
9	Adrianus de Jong	Netherlands	4	7
10	Jean Lacroix	France	2	9
11	Jan van der Wiel	Netherlands	2	9
12	Hans Thomson	Germany	0	11
