= Chile at the 1928 Summer Olympics =

- IOC code: CHI
- NOC: Chilean Olympic Committee

in Amsterdam
- Competitors: 38 in 6 sports
- Flag bearer: Manuel Plaza
- Medals Ranked 30th: Gold 0 Silver 1 Bronze 0 Total 1

Summer Olympics appearances (overview)
- ~~1896~~; 1900–1908; 1912; 1920; 1924; 1928; 1932; 1936; 1948; 1952; 1956; 1960; 1964; 1968; 1972; 1976; 1980; 1984; 1988; 1992; 1996; 2000; 2004; 2008; 2012; 2016; 2020; 2024; 2028

Chile competed at the 1928 Summer Olympics in Amsterdam, Netherlands, the nation's fifth appearance out of eight editions of the Summer Olympic Games. The all-male national team of 38 athletes competed in 22 events in 6 sports. This edition marked Chile's first Olympic medal in the silver category.

== Medalists ==
Medal	Name	Sport	Event	Date
Silver	Manuel Plaza	Athletics	Men's Marathon	August 5

== Athletics ==
8 athletes, all men, represented Chile in 1928. It was the nation's 5th appearance in the sport, in which Chile had competed each time the nation appeared at the Games. Chile won its first Olympic medal—in any sport—when Manuel Plaza took silver in the men's marathon.

Track and road events

Athlete	Event	Heat		Quarterfinal		Semifinal		Final	
Athlete	Event	Result	Rank	Result	Rank	Result	Rank	Result	Rank
Óscar Alvarado	Men's 100 metres	Unknown	4	Did not advance					
Rodolfo Wagner	Men's 100 metres	Unknown	3	Did not advance					
Alejandro Hannig	Men's 200 metres	Unknown	5	Did not advance					
Alejandro Hannig	Men's 400 metres	Unknown	5	Did not advance					
José Vicente Salinas	Men's 400 metres	Unknown	3	Did not advance					
Alfredo Ugarte	Men's 110 metres hurdles	—N/a		Unknown	3	Did not advance			
Manuel Plaza	Men's marathon	—N/a						2:33:23	2nd place, silver medalist(s)

Field events

Athlete	Event	Qualification		Final	
Athlete	Event	Distance	Position	Distance	Position
Óscar Alvarado	Men's long jump	6.51	8	Did not advance	
Héctor Benaprés	Men's discus throw	38.18	8	Did not advance	
Ricardo Bayer	Men's hammer throw	46.23	5	Did not advance	

== Boxing ==
4 boxers, all men, represented Chile in 1928. It was the nation's 2nd appearance in the sport. Díaz matched Chile's best ever finish in boxing, reaching the quarterfinals.

Boxer	Event	Round of 32	Round of 16	Quarterfinals	Semifinals	Final / Bronze match	
Boxer	Event	Opposition Result	Opposition Result	Opposition Result	Opposition Result	Opposition Result	Rank
José Turra	Men's flyweight	Nikolaos Felix (GRE); L points	Did not advance				17
Osvaldo Sánchez	Men's bantamweight	Stefan Glon (POL); W points	John Daley (USA); L points	Did not advance			9
Jorge Díaz	Men's lightweight	William O'Shea (IRL); W points	Georges Carcagne (FRA); W points	Gunnar Berggren (SWE); L points	Did not advance		5
Sergio Ojeda Dóren	Men's light heavyweight	—N/a	Víctor Avendaño (ARG); L points	Did not advance			9

== Cycling ==
Five cyclists (all in track), all men, represented Chile in 1928. It was the nation's 3rd appearance in the sport.

=== Track cycling ===
Time trial

Cyclist	Event	Time	Rank
Edmond Maillard	Men's time trial	1:20.1	14

Match races

Cyclist	Event	1st Round		Repechage 1		Repechage Final		Quarterfinals		Semifinals		Final / Bronze match	
Cyclist	Event	Time	Rank	Time	Rank	Time	Rank	Time	Rank	Time	Rank	Time	Rank
Jorge Gamboa	Men's team pursuit	Unknown	2	—N/a				Did not advance					
Edmond Maillard	Men's team pursuit	Unknown	2	—N/a				Did not advance					
Carlos Rocuant	Men's team pursuit	Unknown	2	—N/a				Did not advance					
Alejandro Vidal	Men's team pursuit	Unknown	2	—N/a				Did not advance					
Francisco Juillet	Men's sprint	Unknown	3 R	Unknown	2	Did not advance							

== Fencing ==
Six fencers, all men, represented Chile in 1928. It was the nation's 2nd appearance in the sport.

Fencer	Event	Round 1		Quarterfinals		Semifinals		Final	
Fencer	Event	Result	Rank	Result	Rank	Result	Rank	Result	Rank
Tomás Goyoaga	Men's épée	3 wins	8	Did not advance					
Tomás Goyoaga	Men's foil	—N/a		1 win	7	Did not advance			
Abelardo Castro	Men's sabre	—N/a		Bye		1 win	8	Did not advance	
Efrain Díaz	Men's sabre	—N/a		2 wins	5	Did not advance			
Tomás Goyoaga	Men's sabre	—N/a		2 wins	5	Did not advance			
Abelardo Castro	Men's team sabre	—N/a		0–2	3	Did not advance			
Efrain Díaz	Men's team sabre	—N/a		0–2	3	Did not advance			
Jorge Garretón	Men's team sabre	—N/a		0–2	3	Did not advance			
Tomás Goyoaga	Men's team sabre	—N/a		0–2	3	Did not advance			
Oscar Novoa	Men's team sabre	—N/a		0–2	3	Did not advance			
Nemoroso Riquelme	Men's team sabre	—N/a		0–2	3	Did not advance			

== Football ==
;Summary

Team	Event	Prelim.	Round of 16	Quarterfinals	Semifinals	Final / BM	
Team	Event	Opposition Score	Opposition Score	Opposition Score	Opposition Score	Opposition Score	Rank
Chile men's	Men's tournament	Portugal; L 4–2	Did not advance				17

Men's tournament

Chile competed in men's football for the first time in 1928. The team lost its first match against Portugal, 4–2, and were eliminated from the single-elimination tournament. Chile also played in a consolation tournament, defeating Mexico before playing the Netherlands to a full-time draw. After a coin toss the Netherlands were declared winners and were handed the trophy which had been on offer (by the NVB), but gave it to Chile to take home as a 'memento' of the Netherlands, the Olympic Games and their Dutch football friends.

Team roster

Head coach: (England) Frank Powell

No.	Pos.	Player	Date of birth (age)	Caps	Club
-	FW	Oscar Alfaro Saavedra			(Chile) San Luis Quillota
-	FW	Manuel Bravo Paredes	17 February 1897 (aged 31)		(Chile) Santiago Wanderers
-	FW	Alejandro Carbonell			(Chile) Valparaíso Ferroviarios
-	DF	Ernesto Chaparro	4 January 1901 (aged 27)		(Chile) Colo-Colo
-	MF	Humberto Contreras Canales			(Chile) Unión Española
-	GK	Roberto Cortés	2 February 1905 (aged 23)		(Chile) Colo-Colo
-	FW	José Arias			(Chile) The Comercial, city Talcahuano
-	GK	Juan Ibacache Pizarro			(Chile) Carioca FC Valparaíso
-	DF	Jorge Linford			(Chile) Colo-Colo
-	DF	Víctor Morales Sálas	10 May 1905 (aged 23)		(Chile) Colo-Colo
-	FW	José Miguel Olguin			(Chile) Colo-Colo
-	MF	Germán Reyes	20 November 1902 (aged 25)		(Chile) Colo-Colo
-	DF	Guillermo Riveros	10 February 1902 (aged 26)		(Chile) La Cruz FC city Quillota
-	MF	Guillermo Saavedra Tapia	5 November 1903 (aged 24)		(Chile) Colo-Colo
-	FW	Carlos Schneeberger	21 June 1902 (aged 25)		(Chile) Colo-Colo
-	FW	Guillermo Subiabre	25 February 1903 (aged 25)		(Chile) Colo-Colo
-	MF	Arturo Torres	20 October 1906 (aged 21)		(Chile) Everton de Viña del Mar
-	MF	Francisco Arellano			(Chile)

Preliminary round

27 May 1928
15:00

Portugal	4–2	Chile
Vítor Silva 38'; Pepe 40', 50'; Mota 63'	Report	Saavedra 14'; Carbonell 30'

Olympic Stadium, Amsterdam
Attendance: 2,309
Referee: Youssuf Mohamed (EGY)

Consolation tournament, First round

5 June 1928
14:00

Chile	3–1	Mexico
Subiabre 24', 48', 89'	Report	Sota 15'

Monnikenhuize, Arnhem
Attendance: 5,000
Referee: Johannes Mutters (Netherlands)

Consolation tournament, Final

8 June 1928
14:00

Netherlands	2–2 (a.e.t.)	Chile
Ghering 59'; Smeets 66'	Report	Bravo 55'; Alfaro 89'

Stadion Spangen, Rotterdam
Attendance: 18,000
Referee: Guillermo Comorera (Spain)

== Swimming ==
4 swimmers, all men, represented Chile in 1928. It was the nation's debut appearance in the sport.

Swimmer	Event	Heat		Semifinal		Final	
Swimmer	Event	Time	Rank	Time	Rank	Time	Rank
Mario Astaburuaga	Men's 100 m freestyle	unknown	4	did not advance			
Hernán Schüler	Men's 100 m freestyle	unknown	5	did not advance			
Faelo Zúñiga	Men's 100 m freestyle	unknown	4	did not advance			
Hernán Téllez	Men's 400 m freestyle	unknown	5	did not advance			
