= Poland at the 1932 Summer Olympics =

- IOC code: POL
- NOC: Polish Olympic Committee

in Los Angeles, United States 29 July 1932 – 14 August 1932
- Competitors: 51 in 4 sports
- Flag bearer: Janusz Ślązak
- Medals Ranked 14th: Gold 2 Silver 1 Bronze 4 Total 7

Summer Olympics appearances (overview)
- 1924; 1928; 1932; 1936; 1948; 1952; 1956; 1960; 1964; 1968; 1972; 1976; 1980; 1984; 1988; 1992; 1996; 2000; 2004; 2008; 2012; 2016; 2020; 2024

Other related appearances
- Russian Empire (1900, 1912); Austria (1908–1912)

Poland competed at the 1932 Summer Olympics in Los Angeles, United States. 51 competitors, 42 men and 9 women, took part in 21 events in 4 sports.

== Medalists ==
Medal	Name	Sport	Event
Gold	Janusz Kusociński	Athletics	Men's 10,000 metres
Gold	Stanisława Walasiewicz	Athletics	Women's 100 metres
Silver	Jerzy Braun; Janusz Ślązak; Jerzy Skolimowski	Rowing	Men's coxed pair
Bronze	Jadwiga Wajs	Athletics	Women's discus throw
Bronze	Henryk Budziński; Jan Mikołajczak	Rowing	Men's coxless pair
Bronze	Jerzy Braun; Janusz Ślązak; Stanisław Urban; Edward Kobyliński; Jerzy Skolimowski	Rowing	Men's coxed four
Bronze	Tadeusz Friedrich; Marian Suski; Władysław Dobrowolski; Władysław Segda; Adam Papée; Leszek Lubicz-Nycz	Fencing	Men's team sabre

== Athletics ==
Men
Track & road events

Athlete	Event	Heat		Final	
Athlete	Event	Result	Rank	Result	Rank
Janusz Kusociński	5000 m	DNS		Did not advance	
Janusz Kusociński	10000 m	—N/a		30:11.4 OR	Gold medal

Field events

Athlete	Event	Qualification		Final	
Athlete	Event	Distance	Position	Distance	Position
Zygmunt Heljasz	Shot put	—N/a		14.490	9
Zygmunt Heljasz	Discus throw	—N/a		42.59	13
Jerzy Pławczyk	High jump	—N/a		1.90	7

Combined events – Decathlon

Athlete	Event	100	LJ	SP	HJ	400 m	100H	JT	PV	JT	1500 m	Final	Rank
Zygmunt Siedlecki	Result	11.6	6.49	13.56	1.70	53.8	17.0	39.05	3.00	NM	DNS	DNF	
Zygmunt Siedlecki	Points	683	695	701	544	642	599	645	357	DNF		DNF	

Women
Track & road events

Athlete	Event	Heat		Semifinal		Final	
Athlete	Event	Result	Rank	Result	Rank	Result	Rank
Felicja Schabińska	80 m hurdles	12.8	8	—N/a		Did not advance	
Stanisława Walasiewicz	100 m	11.9	1 WR	11.9	1 WR	11.9 WR	Gold medal

Field events

Athlete	Event	Qualification		Final	
Athlete	Event	Distance	Position	Distance	Position
Jadwiga Wajs	Discus throw	—N/a		38.74	Bronze medal
Stanisława Walasiewicz	Discus throw	—N/a		33.60	6

== Fencing ==
Six fencers, all men, represented Poland in 1932.

Men

Ranks given are within the pool.

Fencer	Event	Round 1		Round 2		Quarterfinals		Semifinals		Final	
Fencer	Event	Result	Rank	Result	Rank	Result	Rank	Result	Rank	Result	Rank
Leszek Lubicz-Nycz	Men's sabre	4-2	5 Q	—N/a				2-6	8	Did not advance	13
Adam Papée	Men's sabre	3-3	5 Q	—N/a				2-6	7	Did not advance	15
Władysław Segda	Men's sabre	3-3	6 Q	—N/a				0-1	9	Did not advance	18
Tadeusz Friedrich; Adam Papée; Władysław Segda; Leszek Lubicz-Nycz; Marian Suski; Władysław Dobrowolski	Team sabre	Mexico; W 10-6; Denmark; W 9-5	2 Q	—N/a						Italy; L 1-9; United States; W 8-8; Hungary; L 1-9	Bronze medal

== Rowing ==
Men

Athlete	Event	Heats		Repechage		Final	
Athlete	Event	Time	Rank	Time	Rank	Time	Rank
Henryk Budziński; Jan Mikołajczak	Coxless pair	7:53.4	1 Q	BYE		8:08.2	Bronze medal
Jerzy Braun; Janusz Ślązak; Jerzy Skolimowski	Coxed pair	—N/a				8:31.2	Silver medal
Jerzy Braun; Janusz Ślązak; Stanisław Urban; Edward Kobyliński; Jerzy Skolimowski	Coxed four	7:04.2	1 Q	BYE		7:26.8	Bronze medal

== Art competitions ==
Athlete	Event	Category	Title	Rank
Janina Konarska	Painting	Prints	Narciarze (Skier)	Silver medal
Józef Klukowski	Sculpture	Medals and reliefs	Sport Sculpture II	Gold medal
