= Fencing at the 1932 Summer Olympics =

Fencing at the Games of the X Olympiad

At the 1932 Summer Olympics, seven fencing events were contested.

== Medal summary ==
=== Men's events ===
Event	Gold	Silver	Bronze
Épée, Individual	Giancarlo Cornaggia Medici; Italy	Georges Buchard; France	Carlo Agostoni; Italy
Épée, Team	France; Fernand Jourdant; Bernard Schmetz; Georges Tainturier; Georges Buchard; Jean Piot; Philippe Cattiau	Italy; Saverio Ragno; Giancarlo Cornaggia-Medici; Franco Riccardi; Carlo Agostoni; Renzo Minoli	United States; George Charles Calnan; Gustave Marinius Heiss; Frank Stahl Jr. Righeimer; Tracy Jaeckel; Curtis Charles Shears; Miguel Angel De Capriles
Foil, Individual	Gustavo Marzi; Italy	Joseph Levis; United States	Giulio Gaudini; Italy
Foil, Team	France; Edward Gardère; René Bondoux; René Bougnol; René Lemoine; Philippe Cattiau; Jean Piot	Italy; Giulio Gaudini; Gustavo Marzi; Ugo Pignotti; Gioachino Guaragna; Rodolfo Terlizzi; Giorgio Pessina	United States; George Charles Calnan; Richard Clarke Steere; Joseph Levis; Dernell Every; Hugh Vincent Alessandroni; Frank Stahl Jr. Righeimer
Sabre, Individual	György Piller; Hungary	Giulio Gaudini; Italy	Endre Kabos; Hungary
Sabre, Team	Hungary; Endre Kabos; Attila Petschauer; Ernő Nagy; Gyula Glykais; György Piller; Aladár Gerevich	Italy; Gustavo Marzi; Giulio Gaudini; Renato Anselmi; Emilio Salafia; Arturo De Vecchi; Ugo Pignotti	Poland; Tadeusz Friedrich; Marian Suski; Władysław Dobrowolski; Władysław Segda; Leszek Lubicz; Adam Papée

=== Women's events ===
Event	Gold	Silver	Bronze
Foil, Individual	Ellen Preis; Austria	Judy Guinness; Great Britain	Erna Bogen; Hungary

== Medal table ==
Rank	Nation	Gold	Silver	Bronze	Total
1	Italy	2	4	2	8
2	France	2	1	0	3
3	Hungary	2	0	2	4
4	Austria	1	0	0	1
5	United States	0	1	2	3
6	Great Britain	0	1	0	1
7	Poland	0	0	1	1
Totals (7 entries)		7	7	7	21

== Participating nations ==
A total of 108 fencers (91 men, 17 women) from 16 nations competed at the Los Angeles Games: Cuba had fencers entered, but none competed.

- Argentina (5)
- Austria (1)
- Belgium (7)
- Canada (5)
- Denmark (7)
- France (11)
- Germany (2)
- Great Britain (3)
- Hungary (10)
- Italy (14)
- Mexico (10)
- Netherlands (2)
- Poland (6)
- Switzerland (1)
- Sweden (3)
- United States (21)
