= Hungary at the 1932 Summer Olympics =

- IOC code: HUN
- NOC: Hungarian Olympic Committee

in Los Angeles
- Competitors: 58 (56 men, 2 women) in 11 sports
- Flag bearer: Péter Bácsalmási
- Medals Ranked 6th: Gold 6 Silver 4 Bronze 5 Total 15

Summer Olympics appearances (overview)
- 1896; 1900; 1904; 1908; 1912; 1920; 1924; 1928; 1932; 1936; 1948; 1952; 1956; 1960; 1964; 1968; 1972; 1976; 1980; 1984; 1988; 1992; 1996; 2000; 2004; 2008; 2012; 2016; 2020; 2024

Other related appearances
- 1906 Intercalated Games

Hungary competed at the 1932 Summer Olympics in Los Angeles, United States. 58 competitors, 56 men and 2 women, took part in 39 events in 11 sports.

== Medalists ==
Medal	Name	Sport	Event	Date
Gold	István Pelle	Gymnastics	Men's floor	8 August
Gold	István Pelle	Gymnastics	Men's pommel horse	11 August
Gold	Attila Petschauer; Ernő Nagy; Gyula Glykais; György Piller; Aladár Gerevich; Endre Kabos	Fencing	Men's team sabre	11 August
Gold	Hungary men's national water polo team: István Barta; György Bródy; Olivér Halassy; Márton Homonnai; Sándor Ivády; Alajos Keserű; Ferenc Keserű; János Németh; Miklós Sárkány; József Vértesy	Water polo	Men's tournament	12 August
Gold	György Piller	Fencing	Men's sabre	13 August
Gold	István Énekes	Boxing	Men's flyweight	13 August
Silver	Ödön Zombori	Wrestling	Men's freestyle bantamweight	3 August
Silver	Károly Kárpáti	Wrestling	Men's freestyle lightweight	3 August
Silver	István Pelle	Gymnastics	Men's artistic individual all-around	10 August
Silver	István Pelle	Gymnastics	Men's parallel bars	12 August
Bronze	József Tunyogi	Wrestling	Men's freestyle middleweight	3 August
Bronze	Erna Bogen	Fencing	Women's foil	4 August
Bronze	András Wanié; László Szabados; András Székely; István Bárány	Swimming	Men's 4 × 200 metre freestyle relay	9 August
Bronze	Endre Kabos	Fencing	Men's sabre	13 August
Bronze	Zoltán Soós-Hradetzky	Shooting	Men's 50 metre rifle prone	13 August

Default sort order: Medal, Date, Name

Medals by sport
Sport	1st place, gold medalist(s)	2nd place, silver medalist(s)	3rd place, bronze medalist(s)	Total
Gymnastics	2	2	0	4
Fencing	2	0	2	4
Boxing	1	0	0	1
Water polo	1	0	0	1
Wrestling	0	2	1	3
Shooting	0	0	1	1
Swimming	0	0	1	1
Total	6	4	5	15

Medals by gender
Gender	1st place, gold medalist(s)	2nd place, silver medalist(s)	3rd place, bronze medalist(s)	Total
Male	6	4	4	14
Female	0	0	1	1
Total	6	4	5	15

=== Multiple medalists ===
The following competitors won multiple medals at the 1932 Olympic Games.

Name	Medal	Sport	Event
István Pelle	Gold; Gold; Silver; Silver	Gymnastics	Men's floor Men's pommel horse Men's artistic individual all-around Men's parallel bars
György Piller	Gold; Gold	Fencing	Men's team sabre Men's sabre
Endre Kabos	Gold; Bronze	Fencing	Men's team sabre Men's sabre

== Cycling ==
One male cyclist represented Hungary in 1932.

Individual road race

- Sebestyén Schmidt

== Fencing ==
Ten fencers, eight men and two women, represented Hungary in 1932.

Men's épée

- Tibor Benkő
- Imre Petneházy

Men's sabre

- György Piller-Jekelfalussy
- Endre Kabos
- Attila Petschauer

Men's team sabre

- Attila Petschauer, Ernő Nagy, Gyula Glykais, György Piller-Jekelfalussy, Aladár Gerevich, Endre Kabos

Women's foil

- Erna Bogen-Bogáti
- Margit Danÿ

== Modern pentathlon ==
Three male pentathletes represented Hungary in 1932.

- Elemér Somfay
- Tibor Benkő
- Imre Petneházy

== Shooting ==
Three shooters represented Hungary in 1932, with Zoltán Soós-Ruszka Hradetzky winning a bronze medal.

50 m rifle, prone

- Zoltán Soós-Ruszka Hradetzky
- Tibor Tary
- Antal Barát-Lemberkovits

== Swimming ==
Men

Athlete	Event	Heat		Semifinal		Final	
Athlete	Event	Time	Rank	Time	Rank	Time	Rank
István Bárány	100 m freestyle	1:00.4		59.4		Did not advance	
András Székely	100 m freestyle	1:01.5		1:01.4		Did not advance	
András Wanié	100 m freestyle	1:02.8		Did not advance			
Gyula Kánásy	400 m freestyle	5:40.8		Did not advance			
András Wanié; László Szabados; András Székely; István Bárány	4 × 200 metre freestyle relay	—N/a				9:31.4	3rd place, bronze medalist(s)
