= Ernő Nagy =

Hungarian fencer (1898–1977)

Personal information
- Born: 2 August 1898 Făget, Austria-Hungary
- Died: 8 December 1977 (aged 79) Budapest, Hungary

Sport
- Sport: Fencing
Medal record
Men's fencing
Representing Hungary
Olympic Games
Gold medal – first place	1932 Los Angeles	Sabre, team

Ernő Nagy (2 August 1898 – 8 December 1977) was a Hungarian fencer. He won a gold medal in the team sabre event at the 1932 Summer Olympics. Other members of the team included Aladár Gerevich, Gyula Glykais, Endre Kabos, Attila Petschauer, and György Piller. He retired from competition in 1938, at which point he became head of the fencing section of the Hungarian Athletics Club.
