= Rowing at the 1932 Summer Olympics – Men's coxless pair =

Men's coxless pair at the Games of the X Olympiad
- Venue: Long Beach Marine Stadium
- Date: August 10–13, 1932
- Competitors: 12 from 6 nations
- Winning time: 8:00.0

Medalists
1st place, gold medalist(s)		Lewis Clive; Hugh Edwards	Great Britain
2nd place, silver medalist(s)		Cyril Stiles; Rangi Thompson	New Zealand
3rd place, bronze medalist(s)		Henryk Budziński; Jan Mikołajczak	Poland

The Men's coxless pair competition at the 1932 Summer Olympics in Los Angeles took place at the Long Beach Marine Stadium.

== Schedule ==
Date	Round
Wednesday, August 10, 1932	Heats
Thursday, August 11, 1932	Repechage
Saturday, August 13, 1932	Final

== Results ==
=== Heats ===
First boat of each heat qualified for the final, remainder go to repechage.

==== Heat 1 ====
Rank	Rowers	Country	Time	Notes
1	Henryk Budziński; Jan Mikołajczak	Poland	7:53.4	Q
2	Fernand Vandernotte; Marcel Vandernotte	France	7:54.6	
3	Eugene Clark; Thomas Clark	United States	8:03.2	

==== Heat 2 ====
Rank	Rowers	Country	Time	Notes
1	Lewis Clive; Hugh Edwards	Great Britain	7:47.0	Q
2	Cyril Stiles; Rangi Thompson	New Zealand	7:50.2	
3	Godfried Roëll; Pieter Roelofsen	Netherlands	7:51.8	

=== Repechage ===
First two qualify to the final.

Rank	Rowers	Country	Time	Notes
1	Godfried Roëll; Pieter Roelofsen	Netherlands	8:10.0	Q
2	Cyril Stiles; Rangi Thompson	New Zealand	8:11.4	Q
3	Fernand Vandernotte; Marcel Vandernotte	France	8:13.0	
4	Eugene Clark; Thomas Clark	United States	8:23.0	

=== Final ===
Rank	Rowers	Country	Time	Notes
1st place, gold medalist(s)	Lewis Clive; Hugh Edwards	Great Britain	8:00.0	
2nd place, silver medalist(s)	Cyril Stiles; Rangi Thompson	New Zealand	8:02.4	
3rd place, bronze medalist(s)	Henryk Budziński; Jan Mikołajczak	Poland	8:08.2	
4	Godfried Roëll; Pieter Roelofsen	Netherlands	8:08.4	
