= Alex Forrest =

Alex Forrest may refer to:

- Alex Forrest (fencer) (1881–1964), British fencer
- Alex Forrest (footballer) (born 1908), Scottish footballer
- Alex Forrest (curler) (born 1989), Manitoba curler
- Alexander Forrest (1849–1901), Australian explorer and politician
- Alex Forrest, antagonist in Fatal Attraction
