= Dániel Magay =

Hungarian Olympic champion fencer, chemical engineer

Personal information
- Born: 6 April 1932 (age 94) Szeged, Hungary

Sport
- Sport: Fencing
Medal record
Men's fencing
Representing Hungary
Olympic Games
Gold medal – first place	1956 Melbourne	Sabre, team

Dániel Magay (born April 6, 1932, in Szeged, Hungary) is a Hungarian former sabre fencer. He is known for being part of the Hungarian team which won the gold medal at the 1956 Melbourne Olympics.

== Early training ==
After completing his high school studies at the Piarista Gimnazium, Magay studied with the Italian fencing master Eduardo Armentano, who had immigrated to Hungary as part of the national effort to learn from fencing masters from other countries, dating back to Luigi Barbasetti and Italo Santelli. He also studied with Ferenc Marki in Szeged.

== Fencing success in Hungary ==
Magay was successful in local fencing competitions and became a member of the Hungarian National Sabre Team from 1953 to 1956. In 1953 he competed at the International World Championship Competition in Brussels.

By 1954, Magay had won a gold medal for first place saber team at the 1954 World Championship.

In 1955 he beat Hungary's best saber champion Rudolf Karpathy 5:0.

== The 1956 Melbourne Olympics ==
As a member of the Hungarian National Olympic Saber Team Fencing at the 1956 Summer Olympics in Melbourne, Australia, Magay won Olympic Gold for his country by taking first place in the Saber Team competition.

During this time, the invasion of Hungary and seizure control by Communist Russia forced many Hungarian Olympians to make the decision not to return home. Magay decided to immigrate to the Pacific Coast of the United States with his Hungarian Olympic saber team coach, and prior Olympian, György Piller. (Cohen 2002:402-403).

== Fencing in the United States ==
In 1957, Maestro Piller, Magay, and other Hungarian fencers founded Pannonia Athletic Club in San Francisco for teaching and learning the art of fencing. The Pannonia Athletic Club Saber Team with Magay took first place in the Pacific Coast Sectional Competitions in 1957 and 1959.

In 1957, 1958, and 1961, Magay won the gold medal for Individual Saber in the United States Individual Championships.

In 1958, György Piller became the fencing master of the University of California at Berkeley, and Dániel Magay joined the intercollegiate fencing team while continuing his education in engineering. This combination helped Cal Berkeley to the top of local intercollegiate competition. The University of California 1959 Cal Blue and Gold Yearbook stated: “Cal's Fencing Team, coached by famed Hungarian Master George Piller, enjoyed a successful 1958-59 The Bears beat Stanford, San Jose State, SF State, University of Arizona, and the Air Force Academy to emerge as champions of the Western Intercollegiate Fencing Conference. This feat earned them five first-place trophies.” (University of California 1959:262).

After the death of Maestro György Piller in 1960, Magay arranged for his old Maestro Ferenc Marki to come from Brazil and take over the stewardship of the Pannonia Athletic Club. As a result, the Pannonia Athletic Club victories in team saber continued with Magay in 1961, 1962, 1963, 1964, 1965, and 1966.

After this period, Magay retired and pursued his chosen field of the science of chemistry.

== See also ==
- List of USFA Division I National Champions

== Notes ==
*Cohen, Richard (2002). "By the Sword: A History of Gladiators, Musketeers, Samurai, Swashbucklers, and Olympic Champions." New York: The Modern Library. ISBN 0-330-48229-7. . *University of California (1958). "Blue and Gold Yearbook for 1958." Berkeley: University of California Press.

*University of California (1959). "Blue and Gold Yearbook for 1959." Berkeley: University of California Press.
