= Oflag IV-D =

World War II prisoner-of-war camp in Germany

- Nardt near Hoyerswerda
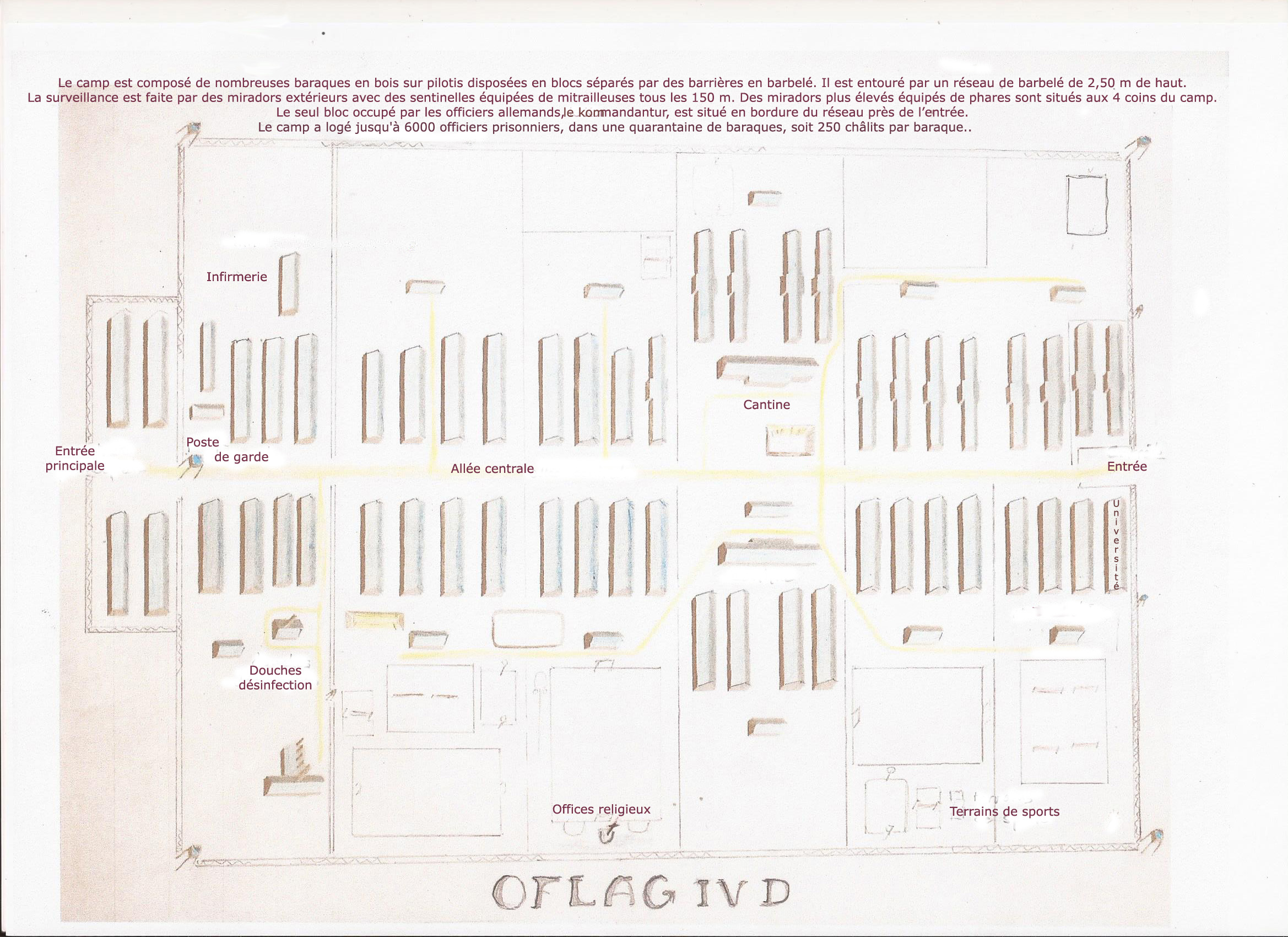
- Map of Oflag IV-D

Site information
- Type: Prisoner-of-war camp
- Controlled by: Nazi Germany

Location
- Coordinates: 51.4514°N 14.1944°E

Site history
- In use: 1940–1945
- Battles/wars: World War II

Garrison information
- Occupants: French, Belgian, Polish, Serbian, British and other Allied prisoners of war

Oflag IV-D was a World War II German Army prisoner-of-war camp located in Elsterhorst (now Nardt) near Hoyerswerda, then part of Lower Silesia, 44 km (27 mi) north-east of Dresden. It held mostly French, but also Belgian, Polish, Serbian, British and other Allied officers.

== History ==
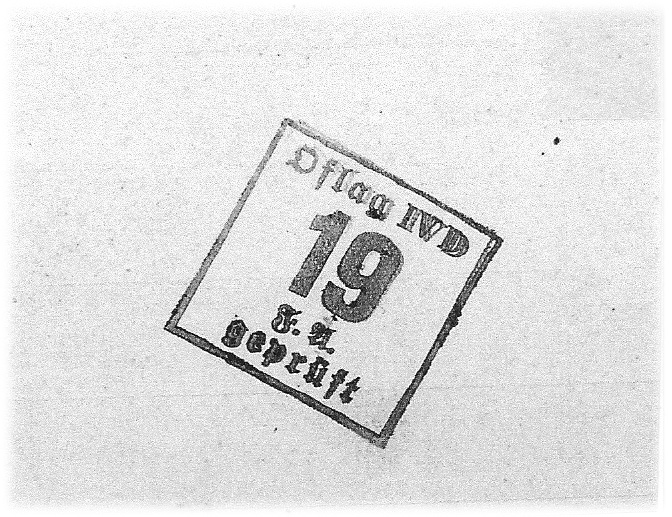
Stamp of Oflag IV-D

In June 1940, part of Stalag IV-A was separated and made into an Oflag for Belgian, British, and French officers taken prisoner during the Battle of France. Also a separate part of the camp was set aside as a hospital for prisoners Reserve Lazarett 742. There was a resistance movement in the camp. Several escape attempts occurred. On March 29–30, 1941, some 30 officers escaped through a tunnel. In September 1943 many British Commonwealth officers from the North Africa campaign. that had been held in Italian prisoner of war camps were transferred to Oflag IV-D

In February 1945, many prisoners were evacuated in death marches in various destinations, whereas some 600 sick officers and French officers-physicians were left in the camp. On April 20, 1945 the camp was liberated by the Red Army.

== Notable inmates ==
- Kazimierz Laskowski, Polish Olympic medalist in fencing

== See also ==
- List of German World War II POW camps

== Sources ==
- Elsterhorst camps in German
