= Eugene Clark (rower) =

American rower (1906–1981)

Personal information
- Born: March 21, 1906 Glenolden, Pennsylvania, United States
- Died: February 1981 (aged 74–75) Havertown, Pennsylvania, United States

Sport
- Sport: Rowing

Eugene Clark (March 21, 1906 – February 1981) was an American rower. He competed in the men's coxless pair event at the 1932 Summer Olympics, with his twin brother, Thomas.
