= Ferenc Marki =

Hungarian fencer and coach

Ferenc Marki

Ferenc Marki (7 November 1912 – 26 May 2008) was a Hungarian fencing master and fencing coach.

== Biography ==
Marki was a fencing master and fencing coach at San Francisco State University, City College of San Francisco, Mills College, and Pannonia Athletic Club who created champion fencers at every level. He died at the age of 95 on 26 May 2008 in Boulder, Colorado.

=== Early life in Hungary ===
Marki was born on 7 November 1912, to Ferenc Marki and Etelka Pinter in Szeged, southern Hungary. After his father died as a hero in World War I, he enrolled in military school at the age 14. He did so well in his studies and excelled so quickly at learning the art of fencing foil, épée, and saber that he was selected to attend at the prestigious Toldi Miklos Royal Hungarian Sports Institute to become a fencing master.

=== Training to be a fencing master at the Toldi Miklos Institute ===
His teacher was the Maestro László Borsody, (Note: Also spelled Borsodi.) who is acknowledged in Hungary as being one of the greatest fencing masters of all time and the creator of the modern Hungarian style of saber fencing. Julius Palffy-Alpar, in his book Sword and Masque states his "ability to build an artistic compromise from the simplest movements, his personal philosophy, and his natural psychological approach caused him to admired by his students." Maestro Borsody taught Olympic Saber Champions George György Piller, Pál Kovács, and most of the best Hungarian fencing masters. All of the great Hungarian fencers of those times were trained either by Italo Santelli or László Borsody. At Toldi Miklos, Marki was also taught by the famous Maestro Alfred Geller (spelled Gellert in Hungarian). Palffy-Alpar identifies Borsody and Geller as being among the top fencing masters in the world during the post World War I era. (Palffy-Alpar 1967:21). He states "Geller, the master of the thrusting weapon at the same institute and a follower of the Italian school, was the author of a book with Tomanoczy in 1942 titled Vivas Kezikonyve [Fencing Handbook]." (Palffy-Alpar 1967:22).

In 1935, Marki achieved the rank of fencing master or "maestro" when he graduated among the very best of his class and received the diploma of Maître d'Armes and Fencing Instructor.

=== Teaching as a fencing master in Hungary ===
After teaching at Toldi Miklos alongside of Maestros Borsody and Gellert until 1938, Marki entered the military and taught fencing at the Hungarian Military Academy.

By 1938, the threat of Germany's expansionist politics caused many Hungarians to join the military. When Germany's seizure of lands in neighboring Austria and Czechoslovakia was unopposed by cowering Allied nations, it became clear that resistance was futile. As a result of the German persecution of Jews in Hungary, in 1941 Maestro László Borsody (who had changed his name from Blum on converting to Catholicism) shot himself rather than be coerced into submission (Cohen 2002:339). Hungarian soldiers had to fight against Russia on its eastern border and Marki was taken as a prisoner of war in one of the major battles there. With the defeat of Germany at the end of World War II, Hungary came under the covert political control of its eastern neighbor, the Soviet Union.

In 1945, Marki returned to Szeged after his mother died to manage the family paprika business, and to resume his passion of teaching fencing.

=== Early success in Hungary as a fencing master ===
From 1948 to 1956, Marki became a very successful fencing master. He joined the SZTK Fencing Club, and began teaching at other leading sports and military fencing clubs, and at the University of Szeged. The value of his skills in teaching championship fencers was quickly recognized by those in power. In 1953, he was invited to teach East German and Czechoslovak fencers at the Tata Olympic Training Camp. In 1954-1955, when the Soviets launched their program to become the most dominant fencers in the world, he was asked to teach Soviet fencers at Budapest. His Soviet students in saber included Yevgeni Cherepovsky, Yakov Rylsky, and David Tyshler, who thereafter were among the first Soviet fencers to win medals at the World Championship in 1955 and in the Olympics a year later.

Meanwhile, his Hungarian students were excelling and becoming fencing champions. Daniel Magay won first place saber team at the 1954 World Championship and at the 1956 Olympics, Thomas Orley won the 1954 Junior World Championship, Katalin Juhász was a rising star in women's fencing who would later become an Olympic team medalist (1960 Silver medal, and 1964 Gold medal) and World Championship Gold medalist (1959, 1962, and 1967), and Jozsef Gyuricza won the 1955 World Championship Gold medal in foil by beating Olympic and World Champion Christian d'Oriola of France and who won an Olympic Bronze foil team medal in 1956.

In the 1955 international competition finals, the magnitude of his success became clear, at the end of a bout where Daniel Magay beat Hungary's best saber champion Rudolf Kárpáti 5 to 0, when his renowned Maestro Alfred Gellert congratulated Marki by stating "Now, I can proudly say that I was your fencing master at one time."

=== Exodus from Soviet takeover of Hungary ===
In 1956, Hungarians began challenging their Communist Russian-controlled government. When state police massacred protesting students, Hungarian soldiers came to their defense and Russia sent in tanks and troops to seize military control of Hungary and begin purging the opposition. Many Hungarians rushed to leave the country. With Russian tanks in the streets of Szeged, Marki with his wife and three children left their lives and home in Hungary behind in the night when they fled across the border at a time when a friend told them the border guards were away having dinner. The Marki family sought refuge in neighboring Yugoslavia, where they first lived for a few months in temporary refugee camps.

The exodus from Hungary caused the loss of its most talented fencing masters and fencers. At 1956 Olympics in Melbourne, Australia, the Hungarian fencing team refused to return to Communist-controlled Hungary. Richard Cohen, in his encyclopedic book "By the Sword: A History of Gladiators, Musketeers, Samurai, Swashbucklers, and Olympic Champions," lists Marki as among the most notable emigrants as one of "the best coaches from the Toldi Miklos Institute" along with others including György Piller, Csaba Elthes (see USFA Hall of Fame), Nicholas Toth (see USFA Hall of Fame), and Julius Palffy-Alpar. (Cohen 2002:402-403).

=== Teaching in Italy and Brazil ===
The Marki family moved west into Italy, where Marki resumed teaching fencing at the esteemed Club di Scherma in Turin. In Italy, he taught Olympic medalists Giuseppe Delfino (team épée Gold in 1952 and 1960, Silver in 1956 and 1964; and individual Gold 1964), Giorgio Anglesio (team épée Gold in 1956), Alberto Pellegrino (team épée Gold in 1956 and foil and épée team Silver in 1964), Fiorenzo Marini (épée team Gold for 1960, and Silver in 1948) and Pier-Luigi Chicca (saber team Silver in 1964 and 1968; and Bronze in 1960).

Again, the recognition came and he was offered the position of coach of the Italian National Team, which he turned down because he did not want to put his friend, who was already in that position, out of a job. As he came to realize that the future educational and occupational opportunities for his children were limited in Italy, he decided to accept an offer as a fencing master at newly constructed Paulistano Athletic Club in São Paulo, Brazil.

=== Teaching fencing in America ===
Marki remained in close contact with other Hungarian expatriate fencing masters and fencers, including Maestro George Piller, who was teaching at Pannonia Athletic Club in San Francisco and at U.C. Berkeley, and Olympic saber champion Daniel Magay.

After Maestro George Piller died, Daniel Magay sent to Brazil for the only fencing master of equal stature who could take Piller's place as Maestro of the Pannonia Athletic Club. Marki came to San Francisco in 1961, hoping to bring his family from Brazil once he established himself as a fencing master in the United States. On January 17, 1962, Marki reopened the Pannonia Athletic Club on the 5th Floor of California Hall in San Francisco.

As before, Marki's reputation for excellence soon spread. By the fall of 1963, Marki was offered a position as fencing master and instructor at Mills College, where his predecessor was Olympic Champion Helene Mayer(See USFA Hall of Fame). Every year, his fencers would do an annual fencing demonstration at Mills College. Marki soon became fencing master at City College of San Francisco, and San Francisco State University, as well.

At Pannonia Athletic Club, Marki continued to train many skilled fencers, including Olympic fencers and U.S. Champions Dániel Magay and Harriet King (See USFA Hall of Fame and Fencing at the 1964 Summer Olympics - Women's foil), and his Pannonia Athletic Club teams won Pacific Coast Championships in 1964, 1965, 1966, 1967, 1968, and 1979. Other well known fencers from Pannonia Athletic Club included Eleanor Turney (see USFA Hall of Fame), Tommy Angell (see Fencing at the 1964 Summer Olympics - Women's foil), and Girard Biagini.

Marki's success did not go unrecognized. As a result of Marki's insistence on the highest standards of excellence and self-discipline in teaching his fencing students, the individuals and teams he coached at City College of San Francisco (including the CCSF men's team of Raymond Chiu, Alan Fong, Chiu Dea, Tat-Ming Ko, and Robert Qwan, and the CCSF women's team of Kathy Aanestad, Jean Michaelis, Barbara Scott, Connie Louie, and Dolores Hong) and San Francisco State University (including the men's team of Carl Sundholm, Byron Streitz, and David Bardoff, and the SFSU women's team of Jan Lenzini, Laura Kryworchenko, Kathy Aanestad, and Jean Michaelis) rose to the top of the Northern California Intercollegiate Fencing Association and Western Intercollegiate Fencing Conferences, yielding many first place trophies and medals by both teams and individuals, even besting the teams of his Hungarian Maestro colleagues Julius Palffy-Alpar at the University of California Berkeley, Francis Zold at USC, and Nicholas Toth (see USFA Hall of Fame) of the Air Force Academy.

Teams and individuals coached by Marki won and medaled in many intercollegiate championships, including gold medal finishes in Northern California competitions in 1970, 1971, 1972, and 1973, and took first place in the Western Intercollegiate Conference in 1971 and 1973.

In 1987, Marki retired and, as he put it, exchanged his fencing sword for a fishing pole. A celebration was held at San Francisco State University, which over 200 of Maestro's students, family, and friends attended.

Marki had over a dozen Olympic Medalists and World Champions among his students, and he transformed fencing programs at the national, club, and collegiate levels into championship level fencing powers.
