= Kazimierz Laskowski =

Polish fencer (1899–1961)

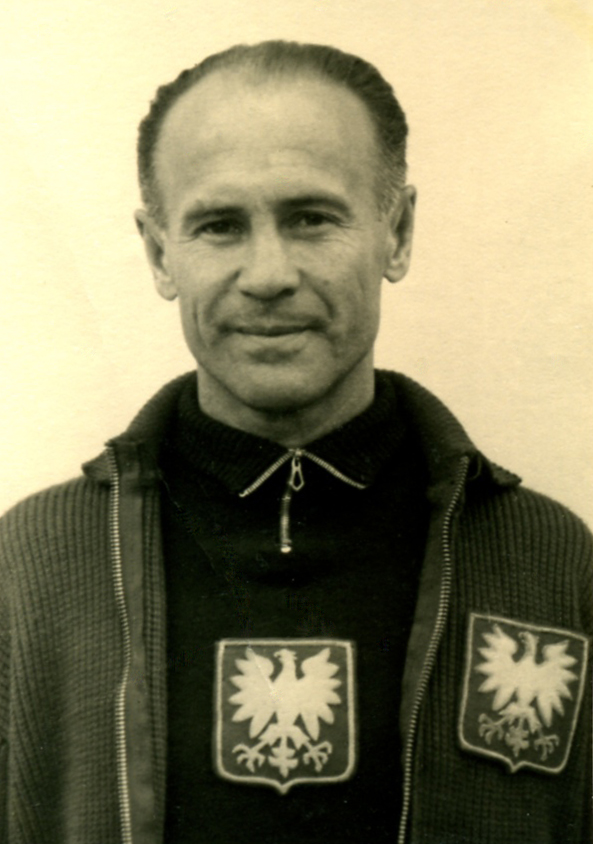
- Kazimierz Laskowski in 1959

Personal information
- Born: 7 November 1899 Troitsk, Russian Empire
- Died: 20 October 1961 (aged 61) Kraków, Poland

Sport
- Sport: Fencing
Medal record
Men's fencing
Representing Poland
Olympic Games
Bronze medal – third place	1928 Amsterdam	Sabre, team

Kazimierz Laskowski (7 November 1899 – 20 October 1961) was a Polish fencer and military officer. He won a bronze medal in the team sabre event at the 1928 Summer Olympics.

In 1916, Laskowski joined the Polish Gymnastic Society "Sokół" in Warsaw. He trained boxing, athletics and fencing. He won two épée Polish championships (1929, 1931), and one sabre Polish championship (1930). In the 1930s, he was a fencing and boxing coach at the Central Institute for Physical Exercise in Warsaw.

Laskowski served since 1918 in the Polish Army.

He commanded a company of the Polish 95th Infantry Regiment during the German invasion of Poland at the start of World War II. Afterwards, he was held by the Germans in the Oflag IV-D, Oflag IX-C, Oflag XI-B, Oflag II-C and Oflag II-A prisoner-of-war camps.
