= László Borsody =

Hungarian fencing master

László Borsody (born Béla Pfeffer; September 6, 1878 in Farmos, Kingdom of Hungary – January 25, 1939 in Budapest, Hungary) was a Hungarian fencing master who is acknowledged in Hungary as being one of the greatest fencing masters of all time. He is the primary creator of the modern Hungarian style of saber fencing which is believed to be the reason for Hungarian success for half a century, winning them gold medals at the World Championships and Olympics. He was the teacher of many excellent Hungarian fencing masters whose influence has been felt throughout the world.

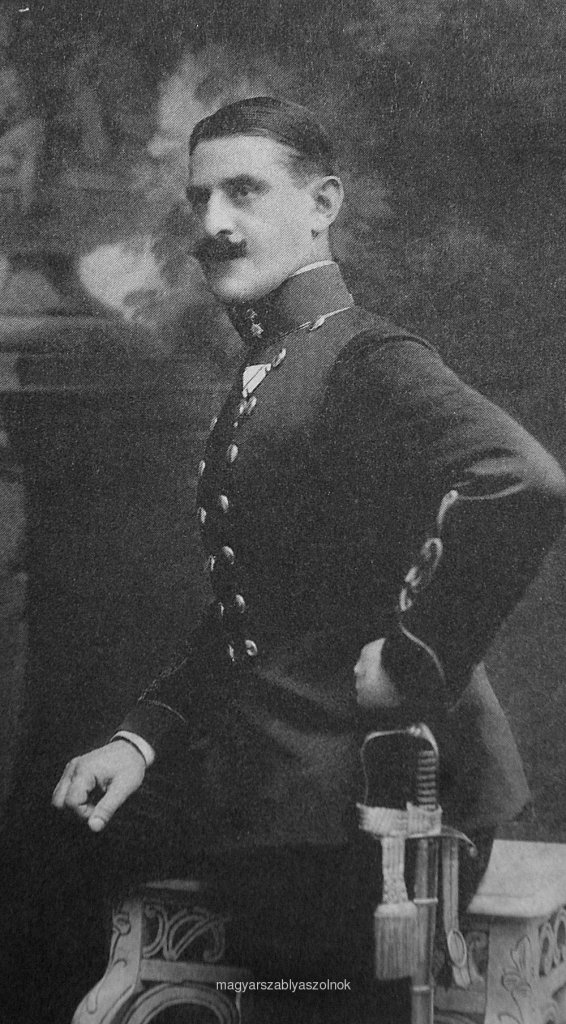
László Borsody

== Life ==
=== Early life ===
He was born László Pfeffer, but took on the name Borsody when he converted from Judaism to Catholicism and joined the army to pursue a military career (Cohen 2002:399). He became a captain and taught fencing at the prestigious Wiener-Neustadt military academy. (Gaugler 1998:418).

=== Borsody's Innovations ===
In the years between the World Wars, László Borsody, returning to earlier principles of Hungarian sabre fencing, developed a system of sabre play that depended upon the articulation of the wrist and fingers, and a defensive system that consisted of the parries of third, fourth, and fifth executed with the arm strongly bent to keep the advanced target well out of the antagonist's reach, as distinguished from the sabre defensive system of Italo Santelli comprising the three parries of second, first, and fifth, executed with the arm three quarters extended (Gaugler 1998:392; 418).

"In Borsody’s sabre technique, the cut was emphasized, and to counter this, he wanted the parries to be taken in close. Santelli, in contrast, took a greater interest in the point, and therefore stressed a defensive system that kept the parties at a distance, maintaining the point in a threatening position.” (Gaugler 1998:392; 418). The modern Hungarian saber style which led to so much success was modeled on Borsody's technique.

=== Toldi Miklos ===
Seeking to establish and maintain superiority, Hungary established the prestigious Toldi Miklos Royal Hungarian Sports Institute fencing masters training academy, under the directorship of László Borsody during the 1930s. (Cohen 2002:397). Borsody was a strict disciplarian. He was revered because he was such a fine teacher turning out a long line of champion fencers. (Cohen 2002:397). He worked with fencers who had already completed their basic training, and although he would correct his student’s technical errors he was more interested in tactics and strategy, teaching his students how to observe their students on the piste and how to exploit their weaknesses. (Cohen 2002:397).

Julius Palffy-Alpar, in his book Masque and Sword, stated that Maestro Borsody's “ability to build an artistic compromise from the simplest movements, his personal philosophy, and his natural psychological approach caused him to admired by his students.” (Palffy-Alpar 1967:21-22).

=== Borsody's Students ===
Maestro Borsody taught Olympic Saber Champions György Piller, Pál Kovács, Ödön Tersztyánszky, Imre Rajczy, and most of the best Hungarian fencing masters, including János Szűts, Csaba Elthes, Janos Kevey, Bela Bay, Ferenc Marki, Julius Palffy-Alpar, and Bela Imregi.(Cohen 2002:403).

=== A Tragic Ending ===
In 1939, Laszlo Borsody's life came to a tragic finish seven months before World War II when he ended his life with a pistol shot rather than be subjected to the Nazi treatment accorded to Jews. He received a funeral with full military honors. (Eisen 1998: n. 39).
