= Jerzy Zabielski =

Polish fencer (1897–1958)

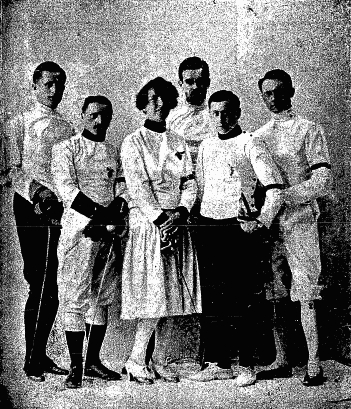
- Fencers team AZS Kraków in 1922. First from the right is Jerzy Zabielski.

Personal information
- Born: 28 March 1897 Warsaw, Congress Poland
- Died: 19 November 1958 (aged 61) Warsaw, Poland

Sport
- Sport: Fencing
Medal record
Men's fencing
Representing Poland
Olympic Games
Bronze medal – third place	1928 Amsterdam	Sabre, team

Jerzy Feliks Zabielski (28 March 1897 – 19 November 1958) was a Polish fencer. He won a bronze medal in the team sabre competition at the 1928 Summer Olympics.

He took part in the Polish-Soviet War. After the war Zabielski studied law at the Jagiellonian University in Kraków. In 1935, he was promoted to the rank of captain. He fought in the September Campaign of World War II, eventually fighting in the Polish Armed Forces in the West. After the war he stayed in the United Kingdom and returned to Poland in 1958.
