= Oflag X-B =

World War II German prisoner-of-war camp

Oflag X-B & Stalag X-C
- Nienburg, Lower Saxony

Site information
- Type: Prisoner-of-war camp
- Controlled by: Nazi Germany

Location
- Nienburg, Germany (pre-war borders, 1937)
- Coordinates: 52.63712°N 9.22566°E

Site history
- In use: 1940–1945
- Battles/wars: World War II

Garrison information
- Occupants: French & other Allied officers and soldiers

Oflag X-B was a World War II German prisoner-of-war camp for officers (Offizierlager) located in Nienburg/Weser, Lower Saxony, in north-western Germany. Adjacent to it was the enlisted men's camp (Stammlager) Stalag X-C.

== Camp history ==
=== Mudra-Kaserne ===
The Mudra-Kaserne ("Mudra Barracks"), named after World War I General Bruno von Mudra, was completed in 1936 in what were then the outskirts of Nienburg. It was occupied by Pionier-Bataillon 22 of the 22. Infanterie-Division until August 1939, when the unit was deployed to the Siegfried Line on the borders of France as part of 5. Armee. From September the Kaserne was used to temporarily house over 1,000 Polish officers captured during the September Campaign while Oflag X-B was being built immediately to the east. In March 1940, before the camp was complete, the Polish officers were transferred to a sub-camp of Oflag X-A at Itzehoe in Schleswig-Holstein.

=== Oflag X-B ===
Oflag X-B was opened in May 1940, and was used to hold French officers captured during the battle of France. The camp was roughly square, about 300 m (980 ft) to each side. Internally, it was divided in half by a road running east-west, the Ziegelkampstraße. To the north of the road were seven prisoner accommodation blocks. Six were built of brick, while the seventh was wood. To the south were four more blocks; three were for senior officers, while the fourth housed their Ordonnanzen ("orderlies"). The accommodation blocks were divided into rooms, each containing from 8 to 12 men. In the centre of the camp was camp kitchen and canteen. In the south-western corner of the camp, separated by a barbed-wire fence, were two hospital blocks, the shower/delousing block, and the detention block.

The camp was enclosed by 2.5 m (8 ft 2 in) double barbed-wire fence, with rolls of barbed-wire in between. About 4 m (13 ft) inside the fence, a strand of electrified wire delimited "no man's land" which it was strictly forbidden to enter. Armed guards manned watchtowers at each corner, and at the centre of each side, of the camp.

The administration buildings and accommodation blocks for the guards were located in a compound outside the main gate of the camp, west of the Oflag, and south of the Kaserne.

The camp was commanded by an elderly Oberst, himself a former prisoner-of-war in Russia during World War I. The inhabitants of each block formed a Kompagnie, and had a German-speaking French officer appointed "block leader" to act as liaison between the POWs and the camp authorities. Generally, the French officers ran much of the camp themselves, organising the cooking of food, and the distribution of fuel, post, and supplies, and also staffed the hospital.

Apart from a roll-call each day at 9 a.m. and 5 p.m, the prisoners were left to their own devices. They were encouraged to occupy their time in study or work, mending clothes and shoes. The prisoners performed plays and musical concerts, and open areas were used as vegetable gardens and to breed rabbits for food.

In June 1941 thirteen officers managed to escape through a 50 m (160 ft) tunnel that they had dug from the easternmost hut out under the fence. Two managed to return home, while the others were soon captured. As a countermeasure, a 3.5 m (11 ft) deep trench was dug alongside the barbed-wire fence.

On the evening of 4 February 1945 a British Lancaster bomber was hit by flak over Nienburg. The aircraft jettisoned its bombs, one of which hit the south-east corner of the camp. Three huts were destroyed, 98 prisoners were killed, and many more injured.

=== Stalag X-C ===
In mid-1940 a camp for sous-officiers and militaires du rang (NCOs and enlisted men), designated Stalag X-C, was opened directly to the north of the officers camp, separated from it by a road. The camp was only about a quarter of the size of the Oflag, and contained just six accommodation blocks, a kitchen, infirmary, post office, supply and detention blocks. Only the detention block was brick-built, with all the other buildings being wooden huts. Each block held between 160-200 POWs.

Initially Stalag X-C held only French soldiers, but later Poles, Belgians, Romanians and Serbs were sent there. In late 1943, following the armistice, Italians arrived. There were also Soviet POWs, who were housed in the easternmost hut which was isolated from the others by an additional barbed-wire fence.

Stalag X-C housed only about 1,000 prisoners, but there were up to 45,000 men in numerous Arbeitskommando scattered throughout the Weser-Ems region attached to it. These work details were assembled at the camps at Stalag X-B Sandbostel and Stalag X-D Wietzendorf, then sent to their place of work in agriculture or industry, before being handed over to the administration of Stalag X-C.

=== Liberation ===
On 5 April 1945 all the fit officers and men were marched to Oflag 83 at Wietzendorf about 65 km (40 mi) to the north-east. The Nienburg camps were liberated by the British Army on 9 April.

== Post-war use ==
In the immediate post-war period Oflag X-B was used to accommodate displaced persons and refugees. It was taken over by the Bundeswehr in the 1950s and housed a military technical school. The southern half was eventually abandoned, and was later built over with housing. Six accommodation blocks and some smaller buildings of the northern half of the camp still survive.

The administration compound was renamed the "Churchill Camp" and used as temporary accommodation until the 1960s. The site is now occupied by shops and office buildings. The buildings of Stalag X-C were demolished, and the site is now covered by woodland and a car-park.

The Mudra-Kaserne was taken over by the British Army of the Rhine and renamed "Assaye Barracks". It was the base of the 21st Regiment, Royal Engineers, from 1950 to 1996, and also of the 24th Missile Regiment, Royal Artillery (1959-1962) (operating the MGR-1 Honest John nuclear surface-to-surface missile), and the 1st Armoured Division Transport Regiment, Royal Corps of Transport (1976-1978). In 1996 the British left the Kaserne, and many of the buildings were demolished. It is currently the site of a hospital, police station, and sports grounds.

== Notable prisoners ==
- Władysław Dobrowolski, Polish Olympic medalist in fencing
- Émile Goué, French composer.
- Pierre Jacobsen, escaped October 1941. Later the first Deputy Director-General of the Intergovernmental Committee for European Migration (ICEM).
- Élie de Rothschild, banker and businessman.
- Józef Unrug, Polish vice admiral
- Marian Konopiński, Capuchin friar and Catholic priest. One of the 108 Blessed Polish Martyrs, beatified in 1999.

== See also ==
- Oflag
- List of prisoner-of-war camps in Germany
