= Thomas Clark (rower) =

American rower

Personal information
- Nationality: American
- Born: March 21, 1906 Glenolden, Pennsylvania, United States
- Died: February 7, 1990 (aged 83)

Sport
- Sport: Rowing

Thomas Clark (March 21, 1906 – February 7, 1990) was an American rower. He competed in the men's coxless pair event at the 1932 Summer Olympics, with his twin brother, Eugene.
