= Mihai Raicu =

Romanian fencer

Sport
- Sport: Fencing

Mihai Raicu was a Romanian fencer. He competed in the individual sabre event at the 1928 Summer Olympics. Raicu is deceased.
