= Óscar Alfaro (footballer) =

Chilean footballer (1904-1939)

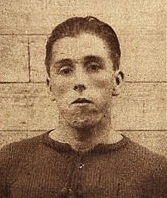
- Óscar Alfaro in 1928

Personal information
- Date of birth: 7 January 1904
- Place of birth: Quillota, Chile
- Date of death: 14 October 1939 (aged 35)

International career
| Years | Team | Apps | (Gls) |
- Chile

Óscar Alfaro (7 January 1904 – 14 October 1939) was a Chilean footballer. He competed in the men's tournament at the 1928 Summer Olympics.
