= Aleksander Małecki =

Polish fencer (1901–1939)

Personal information
- Born: 4 September 1901 Zarubyntsi, Austria-Hungary
- Died: September 1939 Hungary

Sport
- Sport: Fencing
Medal record
Men's fencing
Representing Poland
Olympic Games
Bronze medal – third place	1928 Amsterdam	Sabre, team

Aleksander Antoni Włodzimierz Małecki (4 September 1901 – September 1939) was a Polish fencer. He won a bronze medal in the team sabre event at the 1928 Summer Olympics.

Małecki served in the Polish Army and fought in the September Campaign of World War II. He was probably killed during an attempt to escape to Hungary.
