= Alejandro Hannig =

Chilean sprinter

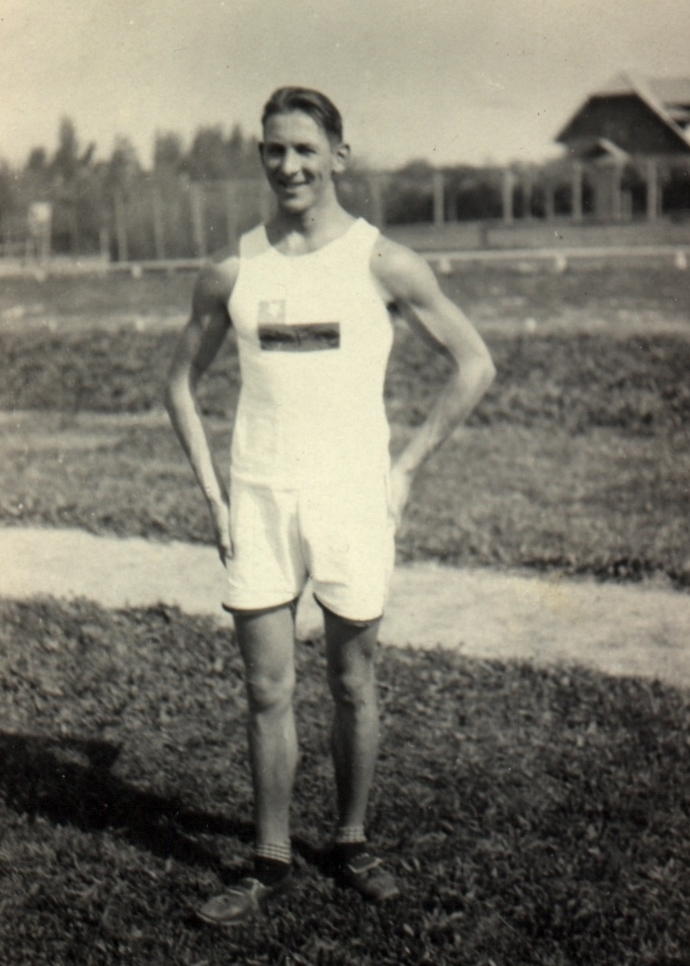
- Hannig at the 1928 Summer Olympics

Personal information
- Born: Alex Hannig; 21 October 1897 Concepción, Chile
- Died: 17 February 1987 (aged 89) Santiago, Chile

Sport
- Sport: Sprinting
- Event: 200 metres

Alejandro Hannig (21 October 1897 – 17 February 1987) was a Chilean sprinter. He competed in the men's 200 metres at the 1928 Summer Olympics.
