= Henri Brasseur =

Belgian fencer

Personal information
- Full name: Henri Robert Achilles Brasseur
- Nationality: Belgian
- Born: 17 October 1906 Hollogne-aux-Pierres
- Died: 10 March 2001 (aged 94)

Sport
- Sport: Fencing

Henri Brasseur (29 October 1906 – 10 March 2001) was a Belgian fencer. He competed at the 1928 and 1936 Summer Olympics.
