= Juan Jesús García =

Spanish fencer

Joaquín García
Personal information
- Born: 11 March 1905
- Died: December 1934 (aged 29)

Sport
- Sport: Fencing

Joaquín García Orcoyen (11 March 1905 – December 1934) was a Spanish fencer. He competed in the individual and team sabre events at the 1928 Summer Olympics.
