= Franjo Fröhlich =

Yugoslav fencer

Sport
- Sport: Fencing

Franjo Fröhlich was a Yugoslav fencer. He competed in the individual sabre event at the 1928 Summer Olympics. Fröhlich is deceased.
