= Tibor Tary =

Hungarian sports shooter

Personal information
- Born: 6 August 1909 Budapest, Austria-Hungary
- Died: 1945 (aged 35–36)

Sport
- Sport: Sports shooting

Tibor Tary (6 August 1909 – 1945) was a Hungarian sports shooter. He competed at the 1932 Summer Olympics and 1936 Summer Olympics.
