= Alejandro Carbonell =

Chilean footballer (1905–1965)

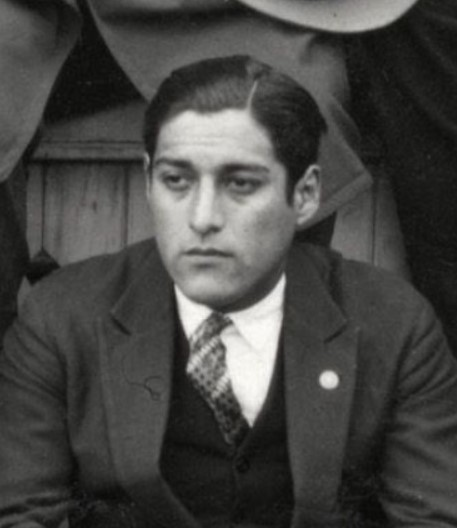

Personal information
- Date of birth: 9 November 1905
- Date of death: 8 September 1965 (aged 59)
- Position: Forward

International career
| Years | Team | Apps | (Gls) |
- Chile

Alejandro Carbonell (9 November 1905 – 8 September 1965) was a Chilean footballer. He competed in the men's tournament at the 1928 Summer Olympics.
