= Pieter Roelofsen =

Dutch rower

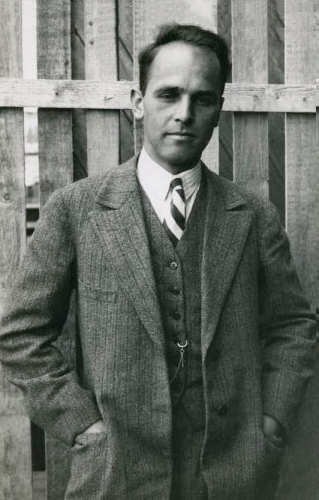
- Pieter Roelofsen in 1932

Personal information
- Born: 20 July 1908 Bandung, Dutch East Indies
- Died: 26 December 1966 (aged 58) Dobbiaco, Italy
- Height: 1.83 m (6 ft 0 in)

Sport
- Sport: Rowing
- Club: Triton, Utrecht
Medal record
Representing the Netherlands
European Rowing Championships
Gold medal – first place	1931 Paris	Coxless pair

Pieter Anthonie Roelofsen (20 July 1908 – 26 December 1966) was a Dutch rower. He competed at the 1932 Summer Olympics in the coxless pairs, together with Godfried Roëll, and finished fourth, 0.2 seconds behind the third place. Roëll and Roelofsen won the European title in 1931.
