= Renato Anselmi =

Italian fencer (1891–1973)

Personal information
- Born: 26 October 1891 Marigliano, Italy
- Died: 3 October 1973 (aged 81) Genoa, Italy

Sport
- Sport: Fencing
Medal record
Men's fencing
Representing Italy
Olympic Games
| Gold medal – first place | 1924 Paris | Sabre, team |
| Silver medal – second place | 1928 Amsterdam | Sabre, team |
| Silver medal – second place | 1932 Los Angeles | Sabre, team |

Renato Anselmi (26 October 1891 – 3 October 1973) was an Italian fencer. He won a gold and two silver medals at three Olympic Games in the team sabre competitions.
