= Juan Ibacache =

Chilean footballer (1903–1979)

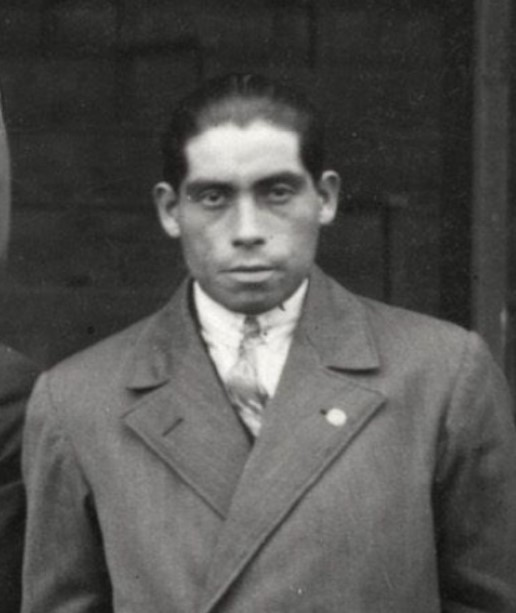

Personal information
- Full name: Juan Ibacache Pizarro
- Date of birth: 1 May 1903
- Place of birth: Cabildo, Chile
- Date of death: 3 August 1979 (aged 76)
- Position: Goalkeeper

Senior career*
Years	Team	Apps	(Gls)
- Deportes Magallanes

International career
- Chile
- * Club domestic league appearances and goals

Juan Ibacache Pizarro (1 May 1903 – 3 August 1979) was a Chilean footballer. He competed in the men's tournament at the 1928 Summer Olympics.
