= Robin Jeffreys =

British fencer

Personal information
- Born: 15 December 1890 Isle of Wight, England
- Died: 24 November 1963 (aged 72) Canterbury, Kent, England

Sport
- Sport: Fencing

Robin Jeffreys (15 December 1890 – 24 November 1963) was a British fencer. He competed in the team sabre event at the 1928 Summer Olympics.
