= Frank Powell (footballer) =

Welsh football manager (1883–1946)

Personal information
- Full name: Alfred Frank Powell
- Date of birth: October 1883
- Place of birth: Cardiff, Wales
- Date of death: December 1946 (aged 63)
- Position: Forward

Senior career*
Years	Team	Apps	(Gls)
- Nottingham Forest
1911–1912	Pontypridd		
- Portsmouth

Managerial career
- 1928: Chile
- * Club domestic league appearances and goals

Alfred Frank Powell (October 1883 – December 1946) was a Welsh football player and manager.

== Playing career ==
Powell played for Nottingham Forest and Pontypridd, playing in a number of positions but primarily as a forward. He later was a player-trainer at Portsmouth.

== Coaching career ==
Powell was a trainer at Portsmouth (where he also played occasionally), Cardiff City, Newport County and Clapton Orient.

Powell coached the Chile national team at the 1928 Summer Olympics. In the consolation final of the tournament, Chile drew 2–2 with the Netherlands, who were declared the winners after drawing lots.

Upon his return to the UK, Powell returned to work at Clapton Orient, and was later chairman at Lancing Athletic.
