= Nicolás Reyero =

Mexican fencer

Nicolás Reyero Manrique
Personal information
- Born: 1902 Mexico City, Mexico
- Died: 16 September 1983 (aged 80–81) Mexico City, Mexico

Sport
- Sport: Fencing

Nicolás Reyero Manrique (1902 – 16 September 1983) was a Mexican fencer. He competed in the team sabre event at the 1932 Summer Olympics.
