= Paul Oziol de Pignol =

French fencer

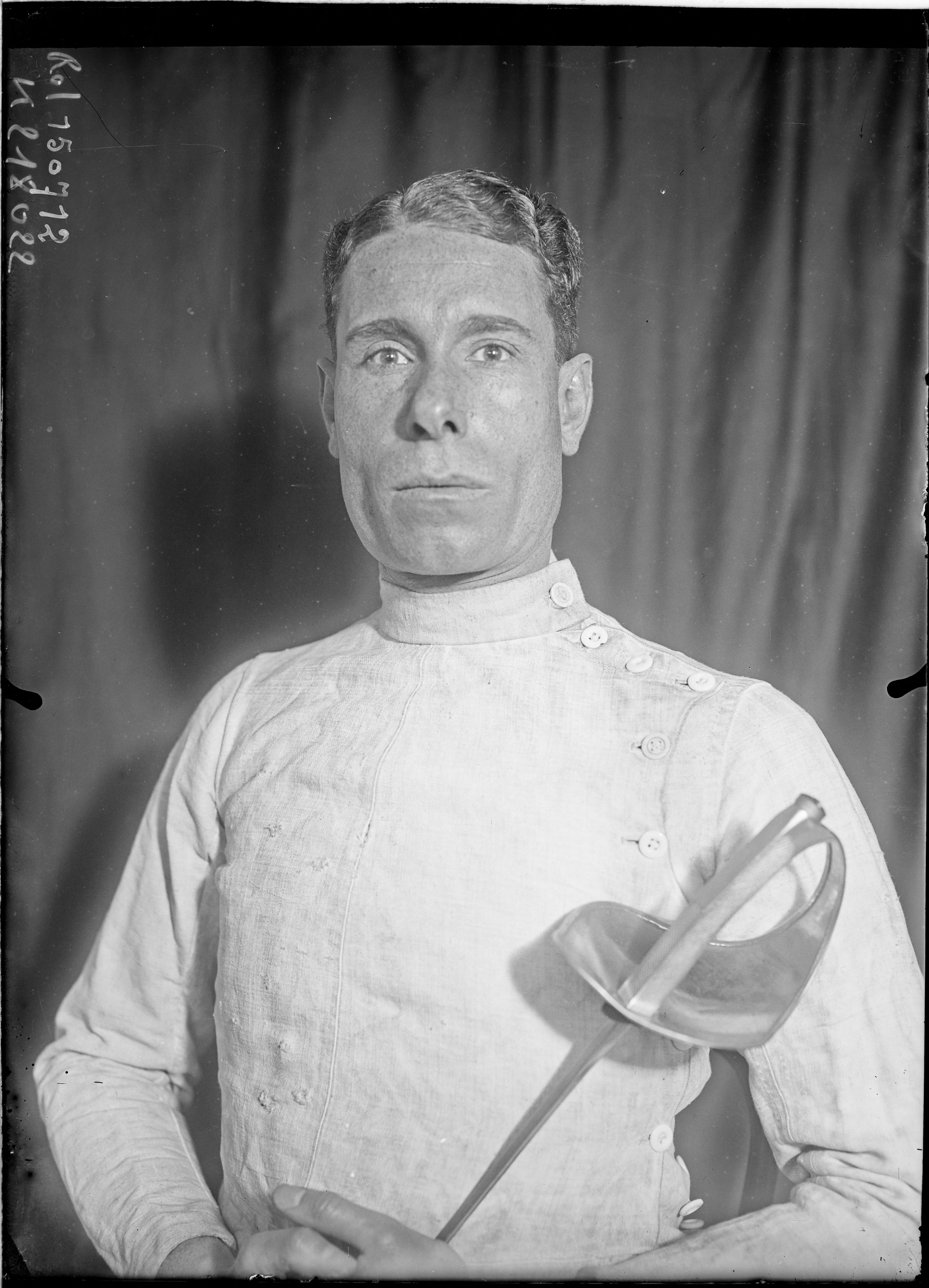

Personal information
- Born: 14 July 1892
- Died: Unknown

Sport
- Sport: Fencing

Paul Oziol de Pignol (born 14 July 1892, date of death unknown) was a French fencer. He competed in the team sabre event at the 1928 Summer Olympics.
