= Humberto Contreras (footballer) =

Chilean footballer

Personal information
- Full name: Humberto Contreras Canales

International career
Years	Team	Apps	(Gls)
- Chile

Humberto Contreras Canales was a Chilean footballer. He competed in the men's tournament at the 1928 Summer Olympics.
