= Ugo Pignotti =

Italian fencer (1898–1989)

Personal information
- Born: 19 November 1898 Florence, Italy
- Died: 22 January 1989 (aged 90) Rome, Italy

Sport
- Sport: Fencing
Medal record
Men's fencing
Representing Italy
Olympic Games
Gold medal – first place	1928 Amsterdam	Foil, team
Silver medal – second place	1932 Los Angeles	Foil, team
Silver medal – second place	1932 Los Angeles	Sabre, team

Ugo Pignotti (19 November 1898 – 22 January 1989) was an Italian fencer. He won a gold medal in the team foil event at the 1928 Summer Olympics and two silver medals at the 1932 Summer Olympics.
