= Godfried Roëll =

Dutch rower (1908–1934)

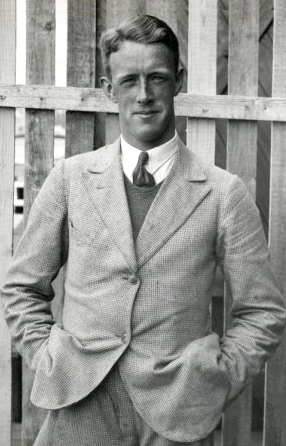
- Godfried Roëll in 1932

Personal information
- Born: 5 April 1908 Utrecht, the Netherlands
- Died: 17 March 1934 (aged 25) Utrecht, the Netherlands
- Height: 1.90 m (6 ft 3 in)

Sport
- Sport: Rowing
- Club: Triton, Utrecht
Medal record
Representing the Netherlands
European Rowing Championships
Gold medal – first place	1931 Paris	Coxless pair
Silver medal – second place	1933 Budapest	Coxless four

Godfried Leonard Roëll (5 April 1908 – 17 March 1934) was a Dutch rower. He competed at the 1932 Summer Olympics in the coxless pairs, together with Pieter Roelofsen, and finished fourth, 0.2 seconds behind the third place. Roëll and Roelofsen won the European title in 1931.

Roëll died in a motorcycle crash when he was aged 25.
