= Henryk Budziński =

Polish rower (1904–1983)

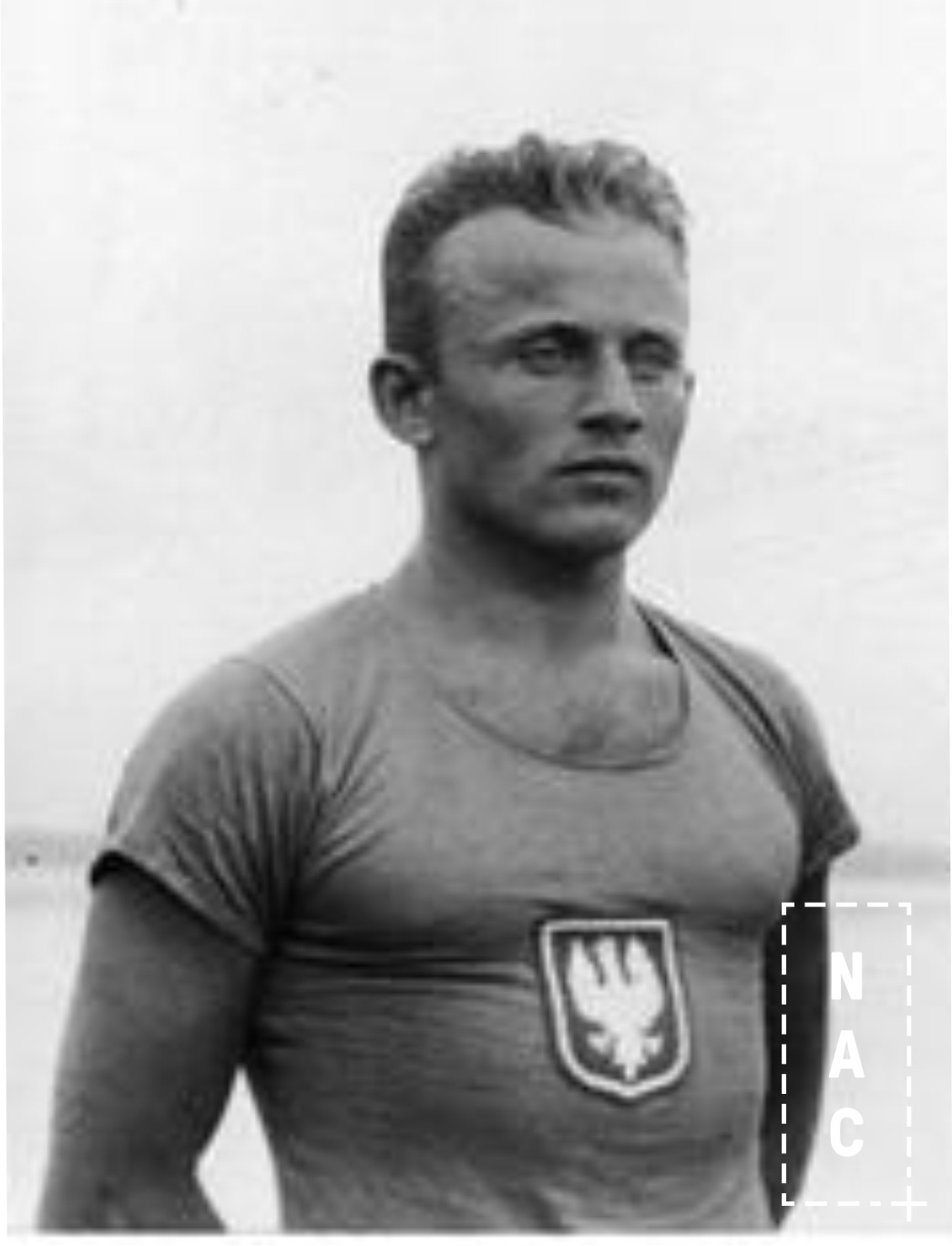
- Budziński in 1930

Personal information
- Born: 29 November 1904 Bobryk, Russian Empire
- Died: 18 March 1983 (aged 78) Gdańsk, Polish People’s Republic
- Height: 168 cm (5 ft 6 in)
- Weight: 68 kg (150 lb)

Sport
- Sport: Rowing
- Club: KW04, Poznań
Medal record
Men's rowing
Representing Poland
Olympic Games
Bronze medal – third place	1932 Los Angeles	Coxless pair
European Rowing Championships
Silver medal – second place	1929 Bydgoszcz	Coxless pair
Gold medal – first place	1930 Liège	Coxless pair
Silver medal – second place	1931 Paris	Coxless four

Henryk Budziński (29 November 1904 – 18 March 1983) was a Polish rower who competed in the 1932 Summer Olympics.

In 1932 he won the bronze medal with his partner Jan Mikołajczak in the coxless pair event. He was born in Bobryk, Belarus and died in Gdańsk.
