= Jan Mikołajczak =

Polish rower (1907–2002)

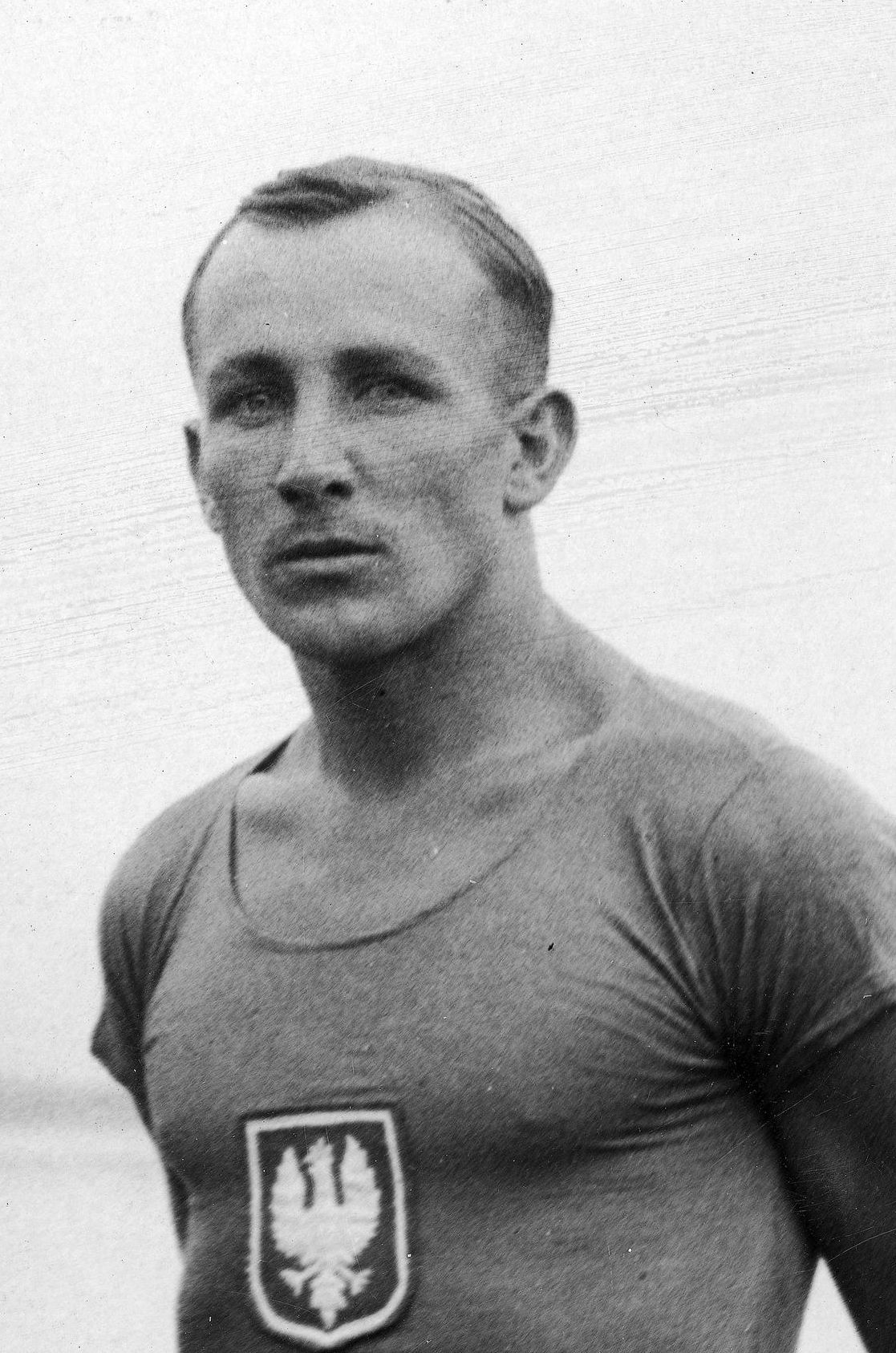
- Mikołajczak in 1930

Personal information
- Born: Janusz Stanisław Mikołajczak; 30 March 1907 Poznań, German Empire
- Died: 15 December 2002 (aged 95) Poznań, Poland
- Height: 172 cm (5 ft 8 in)
- Weight: 68 kg (150 lb)

Sport
- Sport: Rowing
- Club: AZS Poznań
Medal record
Men's rowing
Representing Poland
Olympic Games
Bronze medal – third place	1932 Los Angeles	Coxless pair
European Rowing Championships
Silver medal – second place	1929 Bydgoszcz	Coxless pair
Gold medal – first place	1930 Liège	Coxless pair
Silver medal – second place	1931 Paris	Coxless four

Janusz Stanisław Krenz-Mikołajczak (30 March 1907 – 15 December 2002) was a Polish rower who competed in the 1932 Summer Olympics.

In 1932, he won the bronze medal with his partner Henryk Budziński in the coxless pair event. He was born in Poznań and died in Poznań.
