= Edmond Maillard =

Chilean cyclist

Edmon Maillard
Personal information
- Full name: Edmond Maillard
- Born: 24 July 1896 Talca, Chile
- Died: 7 April 1969 (aged 72)

Cycling career
- Sport: Cycling
- Discipline: Cycling

Edmond Maillard (24 July 1896 – 7 April 1969) was a Chilean cyclist. He competed in the team pursuit and time trial events at the 1928 Summer Olympics.
