= Tadeusz Friedrich =

Polish fencer (1903–1976)

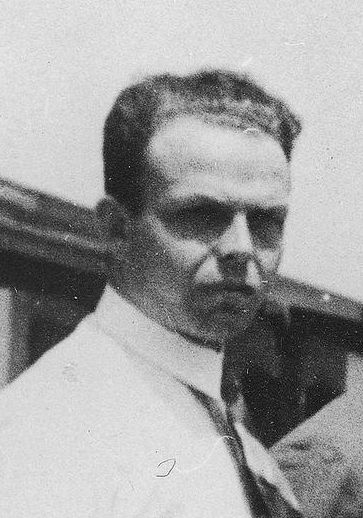
- Friedrich in 1932

Personal information
- Born: 7 July 1903 Nowy Sącz, Austria-Hungary
- Died: 10 October 1976 (aged 73) Kraków, Polish People's Republic
- Spouse: Felicja Schabińska

Sport
- Sport: Fencing
Medal record
Men's fencing
Representing Poland
Olympic Games
Bronze medal – third place	1928 Amsterdam	Sabre, team
Bronze medal – third place	1932 Los Angeles	Sabre, team

Tadeusz Friedrich (7 July 1903 – 10 October 1976) was a Polish fencer. He won a bronze medal in the team sabre event at the 1928 and 1932 Summer Olympics. Friedrich fought in the Warsaw Uprising in 1944. After the war he stayed in Kraków, where he worked as a sport coach. His wife was Felicja Schabińska, Polish athlete and Olympian.
