= Francisco Valero =

Mexican fencer

Personal information
- Born: 29 May 1906 Saltillo, Mexico
- Died: 15 September 1982 (aged 76) Mexico City
- Height: 170 cm (5 ft 7 in)

Sport
- Sport: Fencing

Francisco Valero (29 May 1906 – 15 September 1982) was a Mexican épée and sabre fencer. He competed at the 1932 and 1948 Summer Olympics.
