= Peter Bruder =

American fencer

Peter William Bruder
Personal information
- Born: March 14, 1908 Brooklyn, New York, United States
- Died: May 16, 1976 (aged 68) Freeport, New York, United States

Sport
- Sport: Fencing

Peter William Bruder (March 14, 1908 – May 16, 1976) was an American fencer. He competed in the individual and team sabre events at the 1932 and 1936 Summer Olympics.

== See also ==
- List of USFA Division I National Champions
