= Raoul Fristeau =

French fencer

Personal information
- Born: 11 June 1888
- Died: 25 November 1964 (aged 76)

Sport
- Sport: Fencing

Raoul Fristeau (11 June 1888 – 25 November 1964) was a French fencer. He competed in the individual and team sabre events at the 1928 Summer Olympics.
