= Jean Lacroix =

French fencer

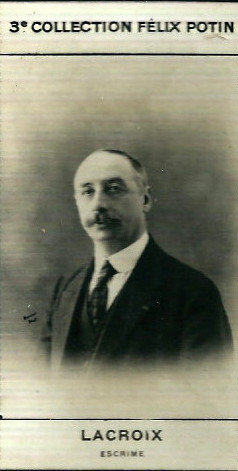

Personal information
- Born: 2 December 1884
- Died: 9 November 1971 (aged 86)

Sport
- Sport: Fencing

Jean Lacroix (2 December 1884 – 9 November 1971) was a French fencer. He competed in the individual and team sabre events at the 1928 Summer Olympics.
