= Felicja Schabińska =

Polish hurdler

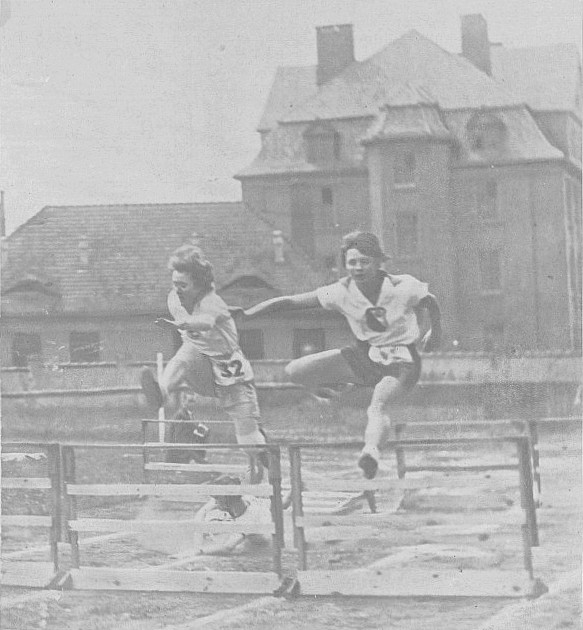
- in 1927

Personal information
- Nationality: Polish
- Born: 20 November 1909 Warsaw, Russian Empire
- Died: 5 June 1996 (aged 86)

Sport
- Sport: Track and field
- Event: 80 metres hurdles

Felicja Schabińska (20 November 1909 – 5 June 1996) was a Polish hurdler. She competed in the women's 80 metres hurdles at the 1932 Summer Olympics.
