= Władysław Dobrowolski =

Polish fencer and athlete (1896–1969)

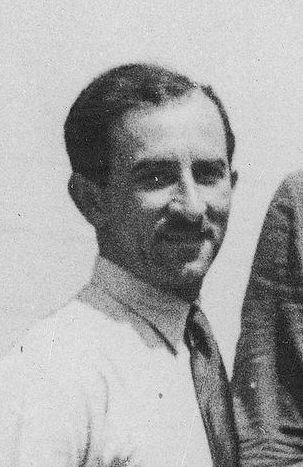
- Dobrowolski in 1932

Personal information
- Born: 2 January 1896 Małobądz, near Będzin, Congress Poland, Russian Empire
- Died: 25 February 1969 (aged 73) Warsaw, Polish People's Republic

Sport
- Sport: Fencing, athletics
Medal record
Men's fencing
Representing Poland
Olympic Games
Bronze medal – third place	1932 Los Angeles	Sabre, team

Władysław Dobrowolski (2 January 1896 – 25 February 1969) was a Polish fencer and track and field athlete and major of the Polish Army in the defense of Warsaw during World War II. During the interwar period, he won a bronze medal in the team sabre event at the 1932 Summer Olympics.

As a young man, active in the independence movement, Dobrowolski was a member of the Polish Military Organization. He fought in the Polish–Soviet War and in the September Campaign of World War II. He was held by the Germans in the Oflag X-A, Oflag X-B, Oflag X-C and Oflag VI-B prisoner-of-war camps.

He was decorated in post-war Poland in 1947.

== Honours and awards ==
- Silver Cross of the Virtuti Militari
- Cross of Independence
- Cross of Valour
- Silver Cross of Merit
