= Marian Suski =

Polish fencer (1905–1993)

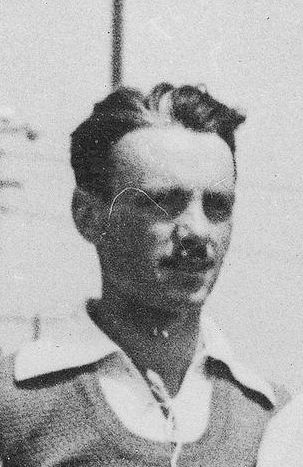
- Suski in 1932

Personal information
- Born: 2 November 1905 Kielce, Congress Poland, Russian Empire
- Died: 25 December 1993 (aged 88) Wrocław, Poland

Sport
- Sport: Fencing
Medal record
Men's fencing
Representing Poland
Olympic Games
Bronze medal – third place	1932 Los Angeles	Sabre, team

Marian Suski (2 November 1905 – 25 December 1993) was a Polish fencer and engineer. He won a bronze medal in the team sabre event at the 1932 Summer Olympics. He served in the Polish Army and commanded the communication during the defense of Warsaw in 1939. After capitulation he was sent to oflag and eventually to Oflag VII-A Murnau.
