= Nemoroso Riquelme =

Chilean fencer

Personal information
- Born: 2 October 1906

Sport
- Sport: Fencing

Nemoroso Riquelme (born 2 October 1906, date of death unknown) was a Chilean fencer. He competed in the team sabre event at the 1928 Summer Olympics.
