= Alex Forrest (fencer) =

British fencer

Personal information
- Born: 26 March 1881 Blackburn, Lancashire, England
- Died: 16 November 1964 (aged 83) Blackburn, Lancashire, England

Sport
- Sport: Fencing

Harry Alexander Forrest (26 March 1881 – 16 November 1964) was a British fencer. He competed in the team sabre event at the 1928 Summer Olympics.
