= Jorge Garretón =

Chilean fencer

Personal information
- Born: 2 April 1899
- Died: 19 August 1935 (aged 36)

Sport
- Sport: Fencing

Jorge Garretón (2 April 1899 – 19 August 1935) was a Chilean fencer. He competed in the team sabre event at the 1928 Summer Olympics.
