= Tomás Goyoaga =

Chilean fencer

Personal information
- Born: 28 June 1898 Santiago, Chile
- Died: 14 November 1937 (aged 39) Santiago, Chile

Sport
- Sport: Fencing

Tomás León Goyoaga Palacios (28 June 1898 – 14 November 1937) was a Chilean epée, foil and sabre fencer. He competed at the 1928 and 1936 Summer Olympics.
