= Arturo De Vecchi =

Italian fencer (1898–1988)

Personal information
- Born: 30 April 1898 Messina, Italy
- Died: 6 January 1988 (aged 89)

Sport
- Sport: Fencing
Medal record
Men's fencing
Representing Italy
Olympic Games
Silver medal – second place	1932 Los Angeles	Sabre, team

Arturo De Vecchi (30 April 1898 – 6 January 1988) was an Italian fencer. He won a silver medal in the team sabre event at the 1932 Summer Olympics.
