= Emilio Salafia =

Italian fencer (1910–1969)

Personal information
- Born: 10 October 1910 Palermo, Italy
- Died: 24 May 1969 (aged 58)

Sport
- Sport: Fencing
Medal record
Men's fencing
Representing Italy
Olympic Games
| Silver medal – second place | 1928 Amsterdam | Sabre, team |
| Silver medal – second place | 1932 Los Angeles | Sabre, team |

Emilio Salafia (10 October 1910 – 24 May 1969) was an Italian fencer. He won a silver medal in the team sabre event at the 1928 and 1932 Summer Olympics.
