= Leszek Lubicz-Nycz =

Polish fencer (1899–1939)

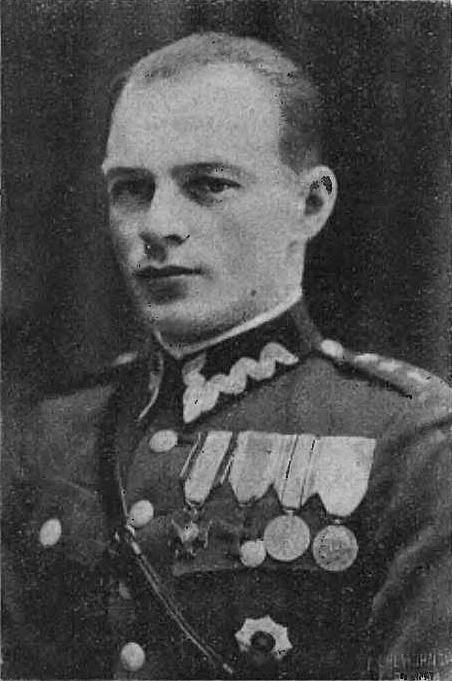

Personal information
- Born: 20 August 1899 Brzesko, Austria-Hungary
- Died: 22 September 1939 (aged 40) Buraków, Second Polish Republic

Sport
- Sport: Fencing
Medal record
Men's fencing
Representing Poland
Olympic Games
Bronze medal – third place	1932 Los Angeles	Sabre, team

Leszek Władysław Lubicz-Nycz (20 August 1899 – 22 September 1939) was a Polish fencer. He won a bronze medal in the team sabre event at the 1932 Summer Olympics. Lubicz-Nycz served in the Polish Army between 1918 and his death in 1939. He was killed in action near Warsaw during the September Campaign.
