= Efraín Díaz =

Chilean fencer

Personal information
- Born: 12 June 1904
- Died: 21 August 1979 (aged 75)

Sport
- Sport: Fencing

Efraín Díaz (12 June 1904 – 21 August 1979) was a Chilean sabre fencer. He competed at the 1928 and 1936 Summer Olympics.
