= Abelardo Castro =

Chilean fencer

Personal information
- Full name: Abelardo Castro Ramírez
- Born: 7 March 1901 (age 125)

Sport
- Sport: Fencing

Abelardo Castro Ramírez (Note: In this Spanish name, the first or paternal surname is Castro and the second or maternal family name is Ramírez.) (born 7 March 1901, date of death unknown) was a Chilean fencer. He competed in the individual and team sabre events during the 1928 Summer Olympics.
