= Gyula Glykais =

Hungarian fencer (1893–1948)

Personal information
- Born: 9 April 1893 Pomáz, Hungary
- Died: 12 June 1948 (aged 55) Szekszárd, Hungary

Sport
- Sport: Fencing
Medal record
Men's fencing
Representing Hungary
Olympic Games
Gold medal – first place	1928 Amsterdam	Sabre, team
Gold medal – first place	1932 Los Angeles	Sabre, team

Gyula Glykais (9 April 1893 – 12 June 1948) was a Hungarian fencer of Greek descent. He won a gold medal in the team sabre event at the 1928 and 1932 Summer Olympics.
