= Władysław Segda =

Polish fencer (1895–1994)

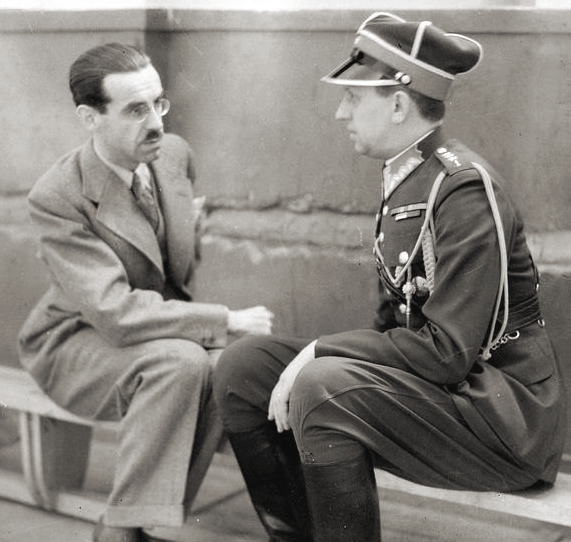
- Władysław Segda (right) with fencer Adam Papee in 1934

Personal information
- Born: 23 May 1895 Przemyśl, Austria-Hungary
- Died: 10 November 1987 (aged 92) Larbert, Scotland

Sport
- Sport: Fencing
Medal record
Men's fencing
Representing Poland
Olympic Games
Bronze medal – third place	1928 Amsterdam	Sabre, team
Bronze medal – third place	1932 Los Angeles	Sabre, team

Władysław Hipolit Segda (23 May 1895 – 10 November 1987) was a Polish fencer and military officer. He won a bronze medal in the team sabre event at the 1928 and 1932 Summer Olympics.

Segda served in the Austrian Army during World War I. Since 1918 he served in the Polish Army. He later fought in the September Campaign of World War II and eventually served in the Polish Armed Forces in the West. After war he remained in emigration. Polish stage, film, TV actress Dorota Segda is his granddaughter. Segda died in Scotland on 10 November 1987.
