= György Piller =

Hungarian fencer (1899–1960)

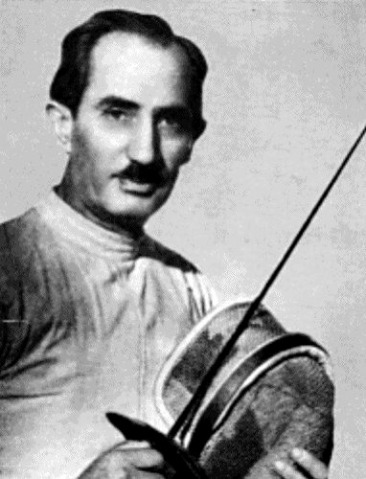

Personal information
- Born: 19 June 1899 Eger, Hungary
- Died: 6 September 1960 (aged 61) San Francisco, California, United States

Sport
- Sport: Fencing
Medal record
Men's fencing
Representing Hungary
Olympic Games
Gold medal – first place	1932 Los Angeles	Sabre, individual
Gold medal – first place	1932 Los Angeles	Sabre, team

George Piller (born György Jekelfalussy-Piller) (June 19, 1899 – September 6, 1960) was an Olympic and world champion fencer from Hungary in the 1920s and 1930s who became an internationally respected world-class fencing master in Hungary and the United States in the 1950s.

== Early life ==
He was born György Jekelfalussy-Piller on June 19, 1899 in Eger, Hungary. Early on he decided on a military career. By 1920, he had graduated from the Ludovica Military Academy where he began training at the fencing school. He became an army officer, but continued his fencing career. He subsequently attended the fencing academy at the Toldi Miklos Royal Hungarian Sports Institute where he became a pupil of the legendary fencing master László Borsody.

== Olympic and world champion fencer ==
His talent led to championships and Olympic gold. In 1930 and 1931, and 1933 he won the gold medal in individual saber at the World Championship. In the fencing events at the 1932 Olympics, in Los Angeles, Piller took 1st place individually in saber and 1st place in team saber. He was awarded the saber team gold medal at the 1933 International Fencing Championship in Budapest. He was Hungarian foil champion six times.

== World-class fencing master ==
In 1951, Piller became a coach and fencing master. He was the coach of the 1956 Melbourne Olympic Gold Medal Hungarian Saber Team Fencing at the 1956 Summer Olympics and defected with the team to the United States after Soviet suppression of Hungarian Uprising in 1956. He Americanized his name to George Piller.

By 1958 he had become the fencing master at the University of California at Berkeley. His success there, aided by World Champion saberman Daniel Magay, was immediate.

The University of California 1958 Cal Blue and Gold Yearbook stated: "Coach George Piller in his first year at Cal, trained a championship team. The future looks very promising for fencing at the University of California. After a long struggle for survival without the services of a coach, Cal fencers were fortunate in getting George Piller to serve as their coach, since Mr. Piller is considered one of the world's greatest fencing masters.". The 1959 Yearbook continued: "Cal's Fencing Team, coached by famed Hungarian Master George Piller, enjoyed a successful 1958-59 The Bears beat Stanford, San Jose State, SF State, University of Arizona, and the Air Force Academy to emerge as champions of the Western Intercollegiate Fencing Conference. This feat earned them five first-place trophies."

Piller also became the fencing master at the Pannonia Athletic Club, whose fencers also won many championships at the amateur level. Some of his notable students included Daniel Magay, Maestro Charles Selberg and John McDougall.

Piller died from a terminal illness in San Francisco, California, on September 6, 1960. The high calibre of his successors was a testament to his greatness: he was followed at University of California Berkeley by Maestro Julius Palffy-Alpar and his successor at Panonia Athletic Club was Maestro Ferenc Marki.
