= Norman Armitage =

American fencer (1907–72)

Norman Cudworth Armitage

Personal information
- Born: Norman Cudworth Cohn; January 1, 1907 Albany, New York, United States
- Died: March 14, 1972 (aged 65) New York City, United States
- Education: Columbia BS, PHd Chemistry; NYU JD Patent Law
- Occupations: Chem. Eng., Patent Lawyer; VP Deering-Miliken Textiles
- Height: 185 cm (6 ft 1 in)
- Weight: 81 kg (179 lb) (Olympics)
- Spouse: Constance Roberta Dean

Sport
- Sport: Fencing
- College team: Columbia University
- Club: Fencer's Club NYC

Achievements and titles
- Olympic finals: 1928, 1932, 1936, 1948, 1952, 1956
Medal record
Men's fencing
Representing United States
Men's fencing
Bronze medal – third place	1948 London	Sabre team

Norman Armitage (January 1, 1907, as Norman Cudworth Cohn – March 14, 1972) was an American patent lawyer, and chemical engineer who became an accomplished textile executive. He was an exceptional saber fencer who competed in six Olympics from 1928 to 1956 and won a bronze Team medal in Sabre in the 1948 London Olympics. Considered one of the greatest sabremen ever produced in America because of his long reign in the sport, after 1930 he was the American Sabre Champion ten times indoors and seven times outdoors, taking an unprecedented seventeen titles in sixteen years.

== Early life ==
Armitage, who was Jewish, was born on January 1, 1907, as Norman Cudworth Cohen in Albany, New York. He changed his name to Armitage after 1928. He later was affiliated with the Episcopal Church of the Advent in Spartanburg, South Carolina.

== Fencing career ==
=== College ===
Remarkably, Armitage had never fenced before he became a member of the Columbia Lions fencing team while a student at Columbia University. Showing noteworthy talent at twenty-one, he won the 1928 Intercollegiate Fencing Association sabre championship. In the Class of 1927, he completed an A.B. a B.S., and later a Doctorate in Chemistry from Columbia.

He later attended New York University Law School, where in 1937 he earned a law degree, and in 1939 earned a Doctor of Jurisprudence (JD) degree in patent law.

=== Marriage ===
On September 20, 1941, at the Cathedral Church of St. Paul in Boston, Mass., he married Constance Roberta Dean Armitage of San Francisco, who became President of the National Federation of Republican Women from 1972-1975 and a leader in the Conservative movement. Mrs. Armitage later served on a number of government councils. The couple were married for over thirty years. She served as a professor of art history at Wofford College in Spartanburg, SC, for 29 years, after moving there in 1960. She was also, for half that time, Wofford's fencing coach for both men and women in saber, epee, and foil. She first learned fencing while a student at the University of California, Berkeley, later completing a Masters in Arabic and English Literature and a PHd in Art History. Mrs. Armitage competed in national fencing contests, ranking as high as sixth place, and represented the United States in team world championships. The couple had a son and a daughter.

=== National sabre championships ===
Norman Armitage won 10 times in 25 appearances at the National Sabre Championships: in 1930, from 1934 to 1936, from 1939 to 1943, and in 1945. He holds 17 national championship titles, more than any other US sabre fencer.

In Team competition, he was a member of the U.S. national three-weapon championship teams for the Fencers Club of New York four times (1929, 1932, 1933, and 1935), the team sabre champions in 1934 and the team epee champions in 1939. He remained in the New York area until 1960.

=== Olympics, 1928-36 ===
In a span of twenty-eight years, Armitage competed in six Olympics, 1928–36 and 1948–56, only taking a break for World War II. He competed for America in 1928, 1932, 1936, 1948, 1952, and 1956. He competed as both an individual and team competitor from 1928 to 1936, but only as a team competitor from 1948 to 1956. Besides the Bronze 3rd place medal in Sabre in 1948, the American Sabre team came in fourth, just out of medal contention, in 1932 and 1948. As an honor, he carried the U.S. flag in the Olympic opening ceremony in 1952 in Helsinki, and in 1956 in Melbourne.

At the 1928 Summer Olympics, he competed (as Norman Cohn) in the individual and team events. The American team was eliminated in the first round, and Armitage reached the semifinals in individual sabre. At the 1932 Summer Olympics, he reached the finals in the team event and finished fourth. In individual sabre, he placed ninth.

Armitage competed at the 1936 Summer Olympics in spite of severe chemical burns on his right hand suffered in January of that year. (He was a chemical engineer, a patent attorney and a textile executive.) He reached the semifinals in individual sabre, and placed fifth in the team sabre event.

==== Bronze olympic medal ====
He won his only medal, a bronze, at the 1948 Summer Olympics, in the team sabre event.

At the 1952 Summer Olympics, Armitage competed in the team sabre event but not the individual sabre. His American team finished fourth, just missing the bronze.

=== Late business life ===
Moving to Spartanburg in 1960, Armitage served as a Patent Lawyer and later Vice-President of Deering Milliken Research Corporation of Spartanburg, South Carolina, where he worked for over ten years, becoming a widely known and well-traveled textile professional.

He died on March 14, 1972, at Columbia Presbyterian Hospital in New York City, after being admitted two days earlier. He was buried at Greenlawn Memorial Gardens in Spartanburg. He was survived by a wife, daughter and son. His widow Constance Dean Armitage who he married in 1941, was President of the National Federation of Republican Women, and an art history professor at Wofford College in Spartanburg, where she served over ten years as the fencing coach.

=== Honors ===
Armitage was the first person to be inducted into the USFA Hall of Fame, in 1963 and was inducted to the Columbia University Athletics Hall of Fame in 2018. He was listed in "American Men of Science". The Armitage Plant of Deering-Milikin Inc. in Spartanberg County, South Carolina, was named in his honor and opened in December 1971. The New York Times called Armitage “one of the greatest fencing champions in modern competition,” and said that he had “probably participated in more Olympic Games than any other American athlete.”

== See also ==
- List of athletes with the most appearances at Olympic Games
- List of select Jewish fencers
- List of Jewish Olympic medalists
- List of USFA Division I National Champions
- List of USFA Hall of Fame members

Olympic Games
Preceded by James Bickford	Flagbearer for United States; Helsinki 1952	Succeeded by James Bickford
Olympic Games
Preceded by James Bickford	Flagbearer for United States; Melbourne 1956	Succeeded by Don McDermott
