= Endre Kabos =

Hungarian fencer (1906–1944)

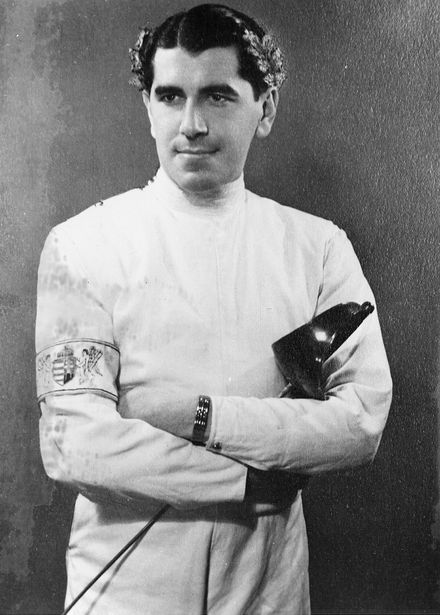

Personal information
- Born: 5 November 1906 Nagyvárad, Austria-Hungary
- Died: 4 November 1944 (aged 37) Budapest, Hungary

Sport
- Sport: Fencing
- Event: Sabre
- Club: Szolniki TIVC
Medal record
Representing Hungary
Gold medal – first place	1932 Los Angeles	Team sabre
Gold medal – first place	1936 Berlin	Individual sabre
Gold medal – first place	1936 Berlin	Team sabre
Bronze medal – third place	1932 Los Angeles	Individual sabre

Endre Kabos (5 November 1906 – 4 November 1944) was a Hungarian sabre fencer. He competed individually and with the team at the 1932 and 1936 Berlin Summer Olympics and won three gold and one bronze medals. In the fall of 1935, the Nazi regime in Germany had passed the antisemitic Nuremberg laws which stripped German Jews of citizenship, opportunities to receive a public education, and access to many professions and public facilities including municipal hospitals. Jewish businesses had been boycotted and Jews could not serve in the legal profession, the civil service, teach in secondary schools or universities or vote or hold public office.

Kabos was noticed internationally after winning the Slovak Championships in 1928. He then collected six gold and one silver medals in sabre at the European Championships in 1930–1935.

Kabos was Jewish. During World War II he was interned for five months in a forced labor camp in Vax. He was called up in June 1944 to work at labour camps for Jews at the village of Felsöhangony, where he was teaching army officers the use of sabre fencing. Later he was transferred to Budapest and was given two horses and a cart to transport food and provisions for others in camp. On 4 November, the day before his 38th birthday, he was driving on Margaret Bridge while German soldiers were preparing explosives to blow up the bridge prior to it being used by the advancing Red Army which at that time was about 150 kilometers to the East of Budapest. Kabos died with many others and only some non-identifiable skeleton parts were found in 2011, when the bridge was being extended.

Kabos was inducted into the International Jewish Sports Hall of Fame in 1986.

== See also ==
- List of select Jewish fencers
- List of Jewish Olympic medalists
