= Adam Papée =

Polish fencer (1895–1990)

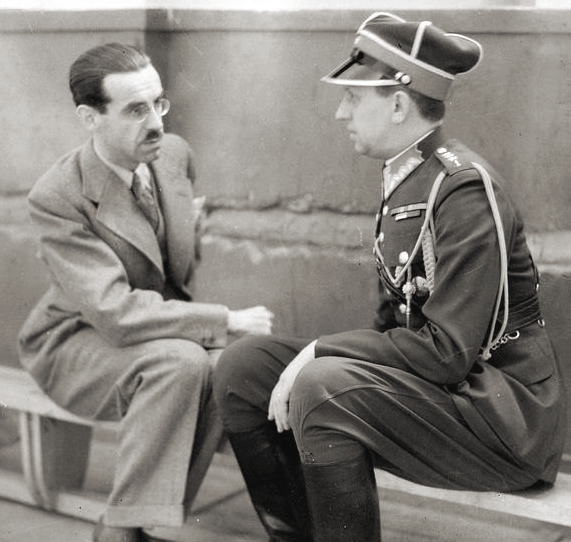
- Adam Papee (left) with fencer Władysław Segda in 1934

Personal information
- Born: 21 July 1895 Lemberg, Austria-Hungary
- Died: 6 March 1990 (aged 94) Bydgoszcz, Poland

Sport
- Sport: Fencing
Medal record
Men's fencing
Representing Poland
Olympic Games
Bronze medal – third place	1928 Amsterdam	Sabre, team
Bronze medal – third place	1932 Los Angeles	Sabre, team

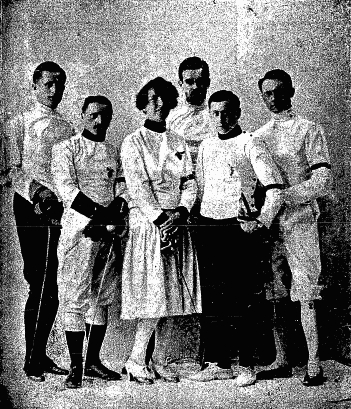
Fencers team AZS Kraków in 1922. Third from the right is Adam Papée.

Adam Stanisław Papée (21 July 1895 – 6 March 1990) was a Polish fencing champion, one of pioneers of fencing in Poland.

Papée was not only a sportsman, but also an official, one of founders of the Polish Fencing Association (Polski Związek Szermierczy). Between 1926 and 1930, he was the director of this association.

He was four times individual champion of Poland (1926, 1927, 1929, 1932), and four times took part in the Summer Olympic Games (1924–1936), winning two bronze medals in team sabre, in Amsterdam (1928) and Los Angeles (1932). He fenced for two clubs - AZS Kraków and Legia Warszawa. After retirement from active sports, he became a coach, also wrote memoirs Na białą broń, published in 1987.
