= Attila Petschauer =

Hungarian fencer (1904–1943)

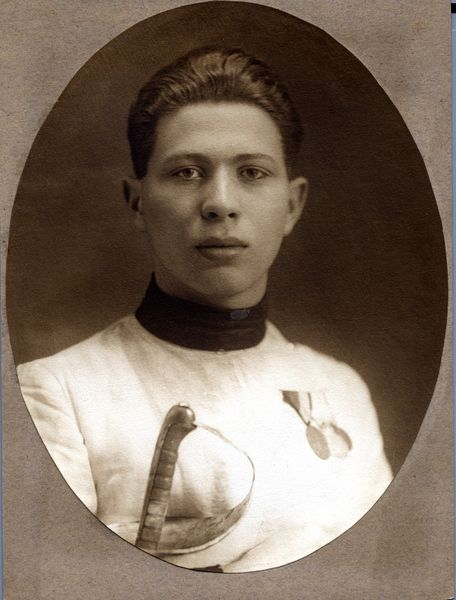

Personal information
- National team: Hungary
- Born: 14 December 1904 Budapest, Austria-Hungary
- Died: 30 January 1943 (aged 38) Davidovka, Reichskommissariat Ukraine

Sport
- Sport: fencing
- Event: sabre
Medal record
Representing Hungary
Men's Fencing
Olympic Games
Gold medal – first place	1928 Amsterdam	Team sabre
Gold medal – first place	1932 Los Angeles	Team sabre
Silver medal – second place	1928 Amsterdam	Individual sabre

Attila Petschauer (14 December 1904 – 30 January 1943) was a Hungarian Olympic champion sabre fencer of Jewish heritage.

== Fencing career ==
Petschauer was born in Budapest, and was Jewish.

He fenced first at a salle in Budapest opened in 1885 by Jewish maestro Károly Fodor (Mózes Freyberger) from the age of 8 to the age of 20, and then trained at Nemzeti Vivó Club (NVC) which was established by the Zionist lawyer Marcell Hajdu. He won four Hungarian National Youth Championships.

He was a member of the Hungarian fencing team in the 1928 and 1932 Olympics. Petschauer was regarded throughout the late 1920s and early 1930s as one of the world's top fencers. Between 1925 and 1931, at the saber world championships he was three times a silver medalist and three times a bronze medalist.

=== Olympic career ===
In Amsterdam in 1928 at the age of 23 he was part of the gold medal-winning Hungarian team in sabre, winning all 20 of his competition matches. In the individual sabre competition, Petschauer won the silver medal.

In the 1932 Summer Olympics in Los Angeles, Petschauer was again part of the champion Hungarian sabre team. The Hungarians won the gold medal in team sabre, and Petschauer finished 5th in individual sabre.

== Murder ==
Petschauer was arrested by the Nazis in 1943 and sent to a forced labor camp in Davidovka, Reichskommissariat Ukraine.

Some claimed that Petschauer was tortured and murdered under orders of a Hungarian officer, a fellow former Hungarian Olympian named Kálmán Cseh, during his service in a Hungarian-Jewish Forced Labor Battalion. A fellow inmate, Olympic champion wrestler Károly Kárpáti, recalled: “The guards shouted: ‘You, Olympic fencing medal winner . . . let’s see how you can climb trees.’ It was midwinter and bitter cold, but they ordered him to undress, and then climb a tree. The amused guards ordered him to crow like a rooster, and sprayed him with water. Frozen from the water, he died shortly after.”

A fictionalized account of his life and death was dramatised in the 1999 film Sunshine, starring Ralph Fiennes.

== Hall of Fame ==
He was inducted into the International Jewish Sports Hall of Fame in 1985.

== Memorial event ==
The Attila Petschauer Event was begun in 1995 as a memorial to Petschauer by his relative, Dr. Richard Markowitz. It is known across the United States as one of the top sabre events.

== See also ==
- List of select Jewish fencers
- List of Jewish Olympic medalists
