= France at the 1936 Summer Olympics =

- IOC code: FRA
- NOC: French Olympic Committee

in Berlin
- Competitors: 201 (190 men and 11 women) in 18 sports
- Flag bearer: Jules Noël
- Medals Ranked 5th: Gold 7 Silver 6 Bronze 6 Total 19

Summer Olympics appearances (overview)
- 1896; 1900; 1904; 1908; 1912; 1920; 1924; 1928; 1932; 1936; 1948; 1952; 1956; 1960; 1964; 1968; 1972; 1976; 1980; 1984; 1988; 1992; 1996; 2000; 2004; 2008; 2012; 2016; 2020; 2024

Other related appearances
- 1906 Intercalated Games

France competed at the 1936 Summer Olympics in Berlin, Germany. 201 competitors, 190 men and 11 women, took part in 100 events in 18 sports.

It was notable for an incident during the opening ceremonies. During the March of the Nations (when each national team with its flag parades on the field), the entire French team gave a straight-arm salute as it passed the box of Adolf Hitler (head of state of the host country for that Olympics, Germany). The French flag was also dipped in such a way as to drag it in the dirt in front of Hitlers box. There was a storm of protest in France after the incident was reported there, and accusations were made that the French Olympic committee was pro-Nazi. The committee stated that the salute (resembling the salute of Germany's ruling Nazi party) was an 'Olympic salute' (similar to Roman salute), and that dipping the colors was a tradition. The incident is recorded in Leni Riefenstahl's 1938 film Olympia.

== Medalists ==
=== Gold ===
- Jean Despeaux – Boxing, Men's Middleweight
- Roger Michelot – Boxing, Men's Light Heavyweight
- Robert Charpentier, Jean Goujon, Guy Lapébie, and Roger-Jean Le Nizerhy – Cycling, Men's 4.000m Team Pursuit
- Robert Charpentier – Cycling, Men's Individual Road Race
- Robert Charpentier, Robert Dorgebray, and Guy Lapébie – Cycling, Men's Team Road Race
- Louis Hostin – Weightlifting, Men's Light Heavyweight
- Emile Poilvé – Wrestling, Men's Freestyle Middleweight

=== Silver ===
- Henri Eberhardt – Canoeing, Men's F1 10.000m Folding Kayak Singles
- Pierre Georget – Cycling, Men's 1.000m Time Trial
- Guy Lapébie – Cycling, Men's Individual Road Race
- Gérard de Ballorre, Daniel Gillois, and André Jousseaume – Equestrian, Dressage Team
- Edward Gardère – Fencing, Men's Foil Individual
- René Bondoux, René Bougnol, Jaques Coutrot, André Gardère, Edward Gardère, and René Lemoine – Fencing, Men's Foil Team

=== Bronze ===
- Louis Chaillot – Cycling, Men's 1.000m Sprint (Scratch)
- Pierre Georget and Georges Maton – Cycling, Men's 2.000m Tandem
- Georges Buchard, Philippe Cattiau, Henri Dulieux, Michel Pécheux, Bernard Schmetz, and Paul Wormser – Fencing, Men's Épée Team
- Marceau Fourcade, Georges Tapie, and Noël Vandernotte – Rowing, Men's Coxed Pairs
- Marcel Chauvigné, Marcel Cosmat, Fernand Vandernotte, Marcel Vandernotte, and Noël Vandernotte – Rowing, Men's Coxed Fours
- Charles des Jammonières – Shooting, Men's Free Pistol

== Cycling ==
Eight cyclists, all men, represented France in 1936.

Individual road race

- Robert Charpentier
- Guy Lapébie
- Robert Dorgebray
- Jean Goujon

Team road race

- Robert Charpentier
- Guy Lapébie
- Robert Dorgebray
- Jean Goujon

Sprint

- Louis Chaillot

Time trial

- Pierre Georget

Tandem

- Pierre Georget
- Georges Maton

Team pursuit

- Robert Charpentier
- Jean Goujon
- Guy Lapébie
- Roger Le Nizerhy

== Diving ==
Men

Athlete	Event	Final	
Athlete	Event	Points	Rank
Roger Heinkelé	3 m springboard	117.72	12

Women

Athlete	Event	Final	
Athlete	Event	Points	Rank
Cécile Lesprit-Poirier	3 m springboard	58.86	16
Cécile Lesprit-Poirier	10 m platform	25.56	20

== Fencing ==
19 fencers, 16 men and 3 women, represented France in 1936.

Men's foil

- Edward Gardère
- André Gardère
- René Lemoine

Men's team foil

- André Gardère, Edward Gardère, René Lemoine, René Bondoux, Jacques Coutrot, René Bougnol

Men's épée

- Michel Pécheux
- Henri Dulieux

Men's team épée

- Philippe Cattiau, Bernard Schmetz, Georges Buchard, Michel Pécheux, Henri Dulieux, Paul Wormser

Men's sabre

- Marcel Faure
- Edward Gardère
- Jean Piot

Men's team sabre

- Marcel Faure, Maurice Gramain, Edward Gardère, Jean Piot, Roger Barisien, André Gardère

Women's foil

- Agathe Turgis
- Marguerite Reuche
- Andrée Boisson

== Field hockey ==
=== Men's team competition ===
- Preliminary Round (Group C)
  - Lost to the Netherlands (1–3)
  - Defeated Switzerland (1–0)
  - Drew with Belgium (2–2)
- Semi Finals
  - Lost to India (0–10)
- Final
  - Lost to the Netherlands (3–4) → Fourth Place

== Modern pentathlon ==
Three male pentathletes represented France in 1936.

- André Chrétien
- Béchir Bouazzat
- Paul Lavanga

== Rowing ==
France had 19 rowers participate in five out of seven rowing events in 1936.

Men's single sculls

- Henri Banos

Men's double sculls

- André Giriat
- Robert Jacquet

Men's coxed pair

- Georges Tapie
- Marceau Fourcade
- Noël Vandernotte (cox)

Men's coxed four

- Fernand Vandernotte
- Marcel Vandernotte
- Jean Cosmat
- Marcel Chauvigné
- Noël Vandernotte (cox)

Men's eight

- Émile Lecuirot
- Louis Devillié
- Henri Souharce
- Alphonse Bouton
- Camille Becanne
- Bernard Batillat
- Jean Cottez
- Marcel Charletoux
- Claude Lowenstein (cox)

== Shooting ==
Eight shooters represented France in 1936. Charles des Jammonières won a bronze medal in the 50 m pistol event.

25 m rapid fire pistol

- Élie Monnier
- Charles des Jammonières
- Édouard Lambert

50 m pistol

- Charles des Jammonières
- Marcel Bonin
- René Koch

50 m rifle, prone

- Jacques Mazoyer
- Raymond Durand
- Marcel Fitoussi

== Swimming ==
Men

Ranks given are within the heat.

Athlete	Event	Heat		Semifinal		Final	
Athlete	Event	Time	Rank	Time	Rank	Time	Rank
Claude Desusclade	100 m freestyle	1:07.2	5	Did not advance			
René Cavalero	100 m freestyle	1:02.2	5	Did not advance			
Jean Taris	400 m freestyle	4:53.9	2 Q	4:53.6	3 Q	4:53.8	6
Christian Talli	1500 m freestyle	21:03.0	4 q	21:09.8	7	Did not advance	
Artem Nakache; Christian Talli; René Cavalero; Jean Taris	4 × 200 m freestyle relay	—N/a		9:21.7	1 Q	9:18.2	4

Women

Ranks given are within the heat.

Athlete	Event	Heat		Semifinal		Final	
Athlete	Event	Time	Rank	Time	Rank	Time	Rank
Renée Blondeau	100 m freestyle	1:10.9	5	Did not advance			
Louisette Fleuret	400 m freestyle	5:46.8	3 Q	5:46.1	5	Did not advance	
Thérèse Blondeau	100 m backstroke	1:23.8	6	Did not advance			
