= Poland at the 1936 Summer Olympics =

- IOC code: POL
- NOC: Polish Olympic Committee

in Berlin, Germany 1 August 1936 – 16 August 1936
- Competitors: 144 (127 men, 17 women) in 15 sports
- Flag bearer: Klemens Biniakowski
- Medals Ranked 22nd: Gold 0 Silver 3 Bronze 3 Total 6

Summer Olympics appearances (overview)
- 1924; 1928; 1932; 1936; 1948; 1952; 1956; 1960; 1964; 1968; 1972; 1976; 1980; 1984; 1988; 1992; 1996; 2000; 2004; 2008; 2012; 2016; 2020; 2024

Other related appearances
- Russian Empire (1900, 1912); Austria (1908–1912)

Poland competed at the 1936 Summer Olympics in Berlin, Germany. 144 competitors, 127 men and 17 women took part in 55 events in 15 sports.

== Medalists ==
Medal	Name	Sport	Event
Silver	Stanisława Walasiewicz	Athletics	Women's 100 metres
Silver	Jadwiga Wajs	Athletics	Women's discus throw
Silver	Zdzisław Kawecki; Seweryn Kulesza; Henryk Leliwa-Roycewicz	Equestrian	Team eventing
Bronze	Maria Kwaśniewska	Athletics	Women's javelin throw
Bronze	Jerzy Ustupski; Roger Verey	Rowing	Men's double sculls
Bronze	Władysław Karaś	Shooting	Men's 50 metre rifle

== Athletics ==
Men
Track & road events

Athlete	Event	Heat		Quarterfinal		Semifinal		Final	
Athlete	Event	Result	Rank	Result	Rank	Result	Rank	Result	Rank
Teodor Bieregowoj	50 km walk	—N/a						4:42:49.0	9
Kazimierz Fiałka	Marathon	—N/a						DNF	
Bronisław Gancarz	Marathon	—N/a						3:03:11.0	33
Kazimierz Kucharski	800 m	1:55.7	2 Q	—N/a		1:54.7	2 Q	1:53.8	4
Józef Noji	5000 m	15:11.2	3 Q	—N/a				14:33.4	5
Józef Noji	10000 m	—N/a						32:13.0	14
Tadeusz Śliwak; Antoni Maszewski; Kazimierz Kucharski; Klemens Biniakowski	4 × 400 m relay	3:17.6	7	—N/a				did not advance	

Field events

Athlete	Event	Qualification		Final	
Athlete	Event	Distance	Position	Distance	Position
Karol Hoffmann	Triple jump	?	DNQ	did not advance	
Karol Hoffmann	High jump	1.70	32	did not advance	
Edward Luckhaus	Triple jump	?	Q	14.61	11
Jerzy Pławczyk	High jump	1.85	1 Q	1.80	22
Wilhelm Schneider	Pole vault	3.80	1 Q	4.00	6

Combined events – Decathlon

Athlete	Event	100 m	LJ	SP	HJ	400 m	110H	DT	PV	JT	1500 m	Final	Rank
Jerzy Pławczyk	Result	11.6	7.12	11.94	1.85	54.0	16.4	38.30	3.70	54.26	5:04.0	6871	9
Jerzy Pławczyk	Points	686	836	615	846	669	723	662	775	667	392	6871	9

Women
Track & road events

Athlete	Event	Heat		Quarterfinal		Semifinal		Final	
Athlete	Event	Result	Rank	Result	Rank	Result	Rank	Result	Rank
Stanisława Walasiewicz	100 m	12.5	1 Q	—N/a		12.0	2 Q	11.7	Silver medal

Field events

Athlete	Event	Qualification		Final	
Athlete	Event	Distance	Position	Distance	Position
Maria Kwaśniewska	Javelin throw	—N/a		41.80	Bronze medal
Jadwiga Wajs	Discus throw	—N/a		46.22	Silver medal

== Basketball ==
=== Men's tournament ===
Roster

Poland

Coach: Walenty Kłyszejko

- Zdzisław Filipkiewicz
- Florian Grzechowiak
- Zdzisław Kasprzak
- Jakub Kopf
- Ewaryst Łój
- Janusz Patrzykont
- Andrzej Pluciński
- Zenon Różycki
- Paweł Stok
- Edward Szostak

First round

7 August

Italy	44–28	Poland

Imperial Sports Field, Berlin

Second round

9 August

Japan	43–31	Poland

Imperial Sports Field, Berlin

Second consolation round

10 August

Poland	28–23	Latvia

Imperial Sports Field, Berlin

Third round

11 August

Poland	33–25	Brazil

Imperial Sports Field, Berlin

Fourth round

12 August

Poland	WOvs.	Peru

Imperial Sports Field, Berlin

Semifinals

13 August

Canada	42–15	Poland

Imperial Sports Field, Berlin

Bronze medal match

14 August

Mexico	26–12	Poland

Imperial Sports Field, Berlin

== Boxing ==
Men

Athlete	Event	Round of 32	Round of 16	Quarterfinals	Semifinals	Final	
Athlete	Event	Opposition Result	Opposition Result	Opposition Result	Opposition Result	Opposition Result	Rank
Edmund Sobkowiak	Flyweight	Henry C. Cooper (AUS); W KO2	Walter Siegfried (SUI); W PTS	Louis Laurie (USA); L PTS	did not advance		5
Antoni Czortek	Bantamweight	Pierre Bonnet (FRA); W PTS	Alec Hannan (RSA); L PTS	did not advance			
Aleksander Polus	Featherweight	BYE	BYE	Oscar Casanovas (ARG); L PTS	did not advance		5
Czesław Cyraniak	Lightweight	François Aupetit (FRA); W PTS	José Padilla (PHI); L PTS	did not advance			
Józef Pisarski	Welterweight	Leonard Cook (NZL); L PTS	did not advance				
Henryk Chmielewski	Middleweight	BYE	Jean De Schryver (BEL); W PTS	Jimmy Clark (USA); W PTS	Henry Tiller (NOR); L PTS	Raúl Villarreal (ARG); L WO	4
Stanisław Piłat	Heavyweight	BYE	José Feans (URU); L PTS	did not advance			

== Canoeing ==
=== Sprint ===
Men

Athlete	Event	Heats		Repechages		Final	
Athlete	Event	Time	Rank	Time	Rank	Time	Rank
Marian Kozłowski; Antoni Bazaniak	K-2 10000 m	—N/a				47:49.8	11

== Cycling ==
Four cyclists, all men, represented Poland in 1936.

=== Road ===
Athlete	Event	Time	Rank
Mieczysław Kapiak	Men's road race	DNF	
Wiktor Olecki	Men's road race	DNF	
Wacław Starzyński	Men's road race	2:33:08.0	16
Stanisław Zieliński	Men's road race	2:33:08.0	16
Wacław Starzyński; Stanisław Zieliński; Mieczysław Kapiak; Wiktor Olecki	Team time trial	DNF	

== Equestrian ==
=== Eventing ===
Athlete	Horse	Event	Dressage		Cross-country			Jumping			Total	
Athlete	Horse	Event	Dressage		Cross-country			Final			Total	
Athlete	Horse	Event	Penalties	Rank	Penalties	Total	Rank	Penalties	Total	Rank	Penalties	Rank
Henryk Leliwa-Roycewicz	Arlekin III	Individual	123.00	13	110.00	233.00	14	20.00	253.00	15	253.00	15
Zdzisław Kawecki	Bambino	Individual	127.70	15	133.00	260.70	17	40.00	300.70	18	300.70	18
Seweryn Kulesza	Tóska	Individual	138.00	26	300.00	438.00	23	0.00	438.00	21	438.00	21
Henryk Leliwa-Roycewicz; Zdzisław Kawecki; Seweryn Kulesza	See above	Team	388.70	1	543.00	931.70	3	60.00	991.70	2	991.70	Silver medal

=== Show jumping ===
Athlete	Horse	Event	Final	
Athlete	Horse	Event	Penalties	Rank
Janusz Komorowski	Dunkan	Individual	47.25	36
Michał Gutowski	Warszawianka	Individual	DNF	
Tadeusz Sokołowski	Zbieg II	Individual	DNF	
Janusz Komorowski; Michał Gutowski; Tadeusz Sokołowski	See above	Team	47.25	DNF

== Fencing ==
11 fencers, all men, represented Poland in 1936.

Men

Ranks given are within the pool.

Fencer	Event	Round 1		Round 2		Quarterfinals		Semifinals		Final	
Fencer	Event	Result	Rank	Result	Rank	Result	Rank	Result	Rank	Result	Rank
Roman Kantor	Men's épée	5–0	5 Q	—N/a		7–0	2 Q	4–0	6	did not advance	
Antoni Franz	Men's épée	2–1	6	did not advance							
Antoni Sobik	Men's sabre	5–2	2 Q	—N/a		3–1	3 Q	4–1	2 Q	2–6	7
Władysław Segda	Men's sabre	5–2	2 Q	—N/a		3–1	2 Q	2–3	4	did not advance	
Władysław Dobrowolski	Men's sabre	4–1	3 Q	—N/a		2–3	4	did not advance			
Alfred Staszewicz; Teodor Zaczyk; Rajmund Karwicki; Roman Kantor; Kazimierz Szempliński; Antoni Franz	Team epee	Portugal; W 9–7; Switzerland; L 8-8	1 Q	—N/a		Canada; W 8-8; Great Britain; W 8–3	2 Q	Belgium; L 2–14; France; L 4–12; Germany; L 2–8	4	Did not advance	5
Antoni Sobik; Władysław Segda; Władysław Dobrowolski; Adam Papée; Marian Suski; Teodor Zaczyk	Team sabre	Greece; W 9–3	2 Q	—N/a		Sweden; W 15–1; Turkey; W 9–2	1 Q	France; W 10–6; Austria; W 8-8	2 Q	Italy; L 6–10; Hungary; L 1–10; Germany; L 3–9	4

== Football ==
=== Men's tournament ===
Roster

Poland

Coach: Józef Kałuża

- Spirydion Albański
- Franciszek Cebulak
- Ewald Dytko
- Hubert Gad
- Antoni Gałecki
- Wilhelm Góra
- Walerian Kisieliński
- Józef Kotlarczyk
- Henryk Martyna
- Michał Matyas
- Walenty Musielak
- Teodor Peterek
- Ryszard Piec
- Friedrich Scherfke
- Władysław Szczepaniak
- Jan Wasiewicz
- Gerard Wodarz
- Marian Fontowicz
- Edward Madejski
- Wilhelm Piec
- Alojzy Sitko
- Jerzy Wostal

First round

August 5, 1936
17:30

Poland	3–0	Hungary
Gad 12' 27'; Wodarz 88'	Report

Berlin Poststadion
Attendance: 5.000
Referee: Raffaele Scorzoni (ITA)

Quarterfinals

August 8, 1936
17:30

Poland	5–4	Great Britain
Gad 33'; Wodarz 43' 48' 53'; Piec 56'	Report	Clements 26'; Shearer 71'; Joy 78' 80'

Berlin Poststadion
Attendance: 6.000
Referee: Rudolf Eklow (SWE)

Semifinals

August 11, 1936
17:00

Austria	3–1	Poland
Kainberger 14'; Laudon 55'; Mandl 88'	Report	Gad 73'

Berlin Olympic Stadium (Berlin)
Attendance: 82.000
Referee: Arthur Willoughby Barton (GBR)

Bronze medal match

August 13, 1936
16:00

Norway	3–2	Poland
Brustad 15' 21' 84'	Report	Wodarz 5'; Peterek 24' (pen.)

Berlin Olympic Stadium (Berlin)
Attendance: 95.000
Referee: Alfred Birlem (GER)

== Gymnastics ==
Women

Athlete	Event	Individual Standings								Group Exercises						Total	
Athlete	Event	Balance Beam		Uneven Bars		Horse Vault		Individual		Round 1		Round 2		Group		Total	
Athlete	Event	Score	Rank	Score	Rank	Score	Rank	Score	Rank	Score	Rank	Score	Rank	Score	Rank	Score	Rank
Klara Sierońska; Marta Majowska; Matylda Ossadnik; Wiesława Noskiewicz; Janina Skirlińska; Alina Cichecka; Julia Wojciechowska; Stefania Krupa	Women's Team all-around	371.55						371.55	5	51.90	7	46.85	5	98.75	6	470.30	6

== Rowing ==
Poland had eleven rowers (only men were competing at that time) participate in five out of seven rowing events in 1936.

Athlete	Event	Heats		Repechage		Semifinals		Final	
Athlete	Event	Time	Rank	Time	Rank	Time	Rank	Time	Rank
Roger Verey	Single sculls	7:11.01	2 Q	BYE		DNF		did not advance	
Roger Verey; Jerzy Ustupski	Double sculls	6:50.0	2 q	—N/a		8:02.8	2 Q	7:36.2	Bronze medal
Ryszard Borzuchowski; Edward Kobyliński	Coxless pair	7:29.9	1 Q	BYE				8:41.9	6
Jerzy Braun; Janusz Ślązak; Jerzy Skolimowski	Coxed pair	7:53.9	4 q	—N/a		8:56.2	3	did not advance	8
Włodzimierz Zawadzki; Bronisław Karwecki; Stanisław Kuryłłowicz; Witalis Leporowski; Jerzy Skolimowski	Coxed four	6:50.5	5 q	—N/a		8:12.2	2	did not advance	8

== Sailing ==
Open

Athlete	Event	Race														Final rank	
Athlete	Event	1		2		3		4		5		6		7		Final rank	
Athlete	Event	Score	Rank	Score	Rank	Score	Rank	Score	Rank	Score	Rank	Score	Rank	Score	Rank	Score	Rank
Leon Jensz	O-Jolle	18	8	3	23	18	8	13	13	19	7	20	6	20	6	71	18
Janusz Rajmund Zalewski; Jozef Klemens Langowski; Alfons Olszewski; Juliusz Wladyslaw Sieradzki; Stanislaw Zalewski	6 Metre	10	3	11	2	DNF	0	11	2	9	4	9	4	10	3	18	11

== Shooting ==
Men

Athlete	Event	Round 1	Round 2	Round 3	Round 4	Shoot off	Final	
Athlete	Event	Score	Score	Score	Score	Score	Score	Rank
Wojciech Bursa	25 m rapid fire pistol	NM	did not advance					29
Władysław Karaś	50 metre rifle prone	—N/a					296	Bronze medal
Antoni Pachla	50 metre rifle prone	—N/a					288	44
Zenon Piątkowski	25 m rapid fire pistol	18	3	did not advance				27
Kazimierz Suchorzewski	25 m rapid fire pistol	18	6	5	6	1	29	7
Jan Wrzosek	50 metre rifle prone	—N/a					289	40

== Swimming ==
Men

Athlete	Event	Heat		Semifinal		Final	
Athlete	Event	Time	Rank	Time	Rank	Time	Rank
Kazimierz Bocheński; Helmut Barysz; Joachim Karliczek; Ilja Szrajbman	4 × 200 m freestyle	—N/a		DSQ		Did not advance	

== Wrestling ==
Men's Greco-Roman

Athlete	Event	Elimination Pool							Final round	
Athlete	Event	Round 1 Result	Round 2 Result	Round 3 Result	Round 4 Result	Round 5 Result	Round 6 Result	Rank	Final round Result	Rank
Antoni Rokita	−56 kg	Alfred Gilles (BEL); W F 5:53	Ivar Stokke (NOR); L F 8:08	Egon Svensson (SWE); L F 4:49	—N/a			12	did not advance	
Henryk Szlązak	−61 kg	Gyula Móri (HUN); W F 11:25	Ernst Lehmann (SUI); W F 2:50	Einar Karlsson (SWE); L 0–3	Sebastian Hering (GER); L 0–3	—N/a		8	did not advance	
Zbigniew Szajewski	−66 kg	Imam Hassan Ali (EGY); W 2–1	Arild Dahl (NOR); L 0–3	Josef Grahsl (AUT); W F 7:41	Voldemar Väli (EST); L F 15:21	—N/a		7	did not advance	

== Art competitions ==
Athlete	Event	Category	Title	Rank
Jan Parandowski	Literature	Epic works	Dysk Olimpijski	Bronze medal
Stanisław Ostoja-Chrostowski	Painting	Commercial graphic art	Yachting Club Certificate	Bronze medal
Józef Klukowski	Sculpture	Reliefs	Ball	Silver medal
