= Rowing at the 1936 Summer Olympics – Men's coxed four =

Men's coxed four at the Games of the XI Olympiad
- Rowing pictogram
- Venue: Grünau
- Dates: 12–14 August 1936
- Competitors: 80 from 16 nations
- Winning time: 7:16.2

Medalists
1st place, gold medalist(s)		Germany: Hans Maier; Walter Volle; Ernst Gaber; Paul Söllner; Fritz Bauer
2nd place, silver medalist(s)		Switzerland: Hermann Betschart; Hans Homberger; Alex Homberger; Karl Schmid; Rolf Spring
3rd place, bronze medalist(s)		France: Fernand Vandernotte; Marcel Vandernotte; Jean Cosmat; Marcel Chauvigné; Noël Vandernotte

The men's coxed four competition at the 1936 Summer Olympics in Berlin took place are at Grünau on the Langer See. It was held from 12 to 14 August. There were 16 boats (80 competitors) from 16 nations, with each nation limited to a single boat in the event. The event was won by Germany, the second time the nation had won two consecutive gold medals in the men's coxed four (1900 and 1912 was the first; Switzerland also accomplished the feat in 1920 and 1924). Germany's four gold medals overall was the most any nation won in the event before it was discontinued; four nations (including two German teams, the United Team of Germany and East Germany) won two. Switzerland, which had won three straight medals in the 1920s before not competing in 1932, returned to the podium with a silver medal. Bronze went to France, the nation's first medal in the event since 1924. Both Italy (11th place) and Poland (9th place) had two-Games medal streaks broken.

== Background ==
This was the seventh appearance of the event. Rowing had been on the programme in 1896 but was cancelled due to bad weather. The coxed four was one of the four initial events introduced in 1900. It was not held in 1904 or 1908, but was held at every Games from 1912 to 1992 when it (along with the men's coxed pair) was replaced with the men's lightweight double sculls and men's lightweight coxless four.

Six of the seven nations from the 1932 Games returned, with only New Zealand missing; returning nations included gold medallists Germany, silver medallists Italy, and bronze medallists Poland. Switzerland, a perennial contender that had missed the 1932 Games in Los Angeles, competed once again. The favourites were Germany and Switzerland, with Italy also a strong contender.

Uruguay and Yugoslavia each made their debut in the event. Belgium, France, Germany, and the United States each made their fifth appearance, tied for most among nations to that point.

== Competition format ==
The coxed four event featured five-person boats, with four rowers and a coxswain. It was a sweep rowing event, with the rowers each having one oar (and thus each rowing on one side). The competition used the 2000 metres distance that became standard at the 1912 Olympics and which has been used ever since except at the 1948 Games.

Despite the field growing from 7 boats in 1932 to 16 in 1936, the tournament continued to use a three-round format: semifinals, repechage, final.

- There were three semifinal heats, with 5 or 6 boats each. The winner of each heat (3 boats) advanced directly to the final, while the remainder (13 boats) competed in the repechage.
- There were three repechage heats, with 4 or 5 boats each. The winner of each heat (3 boats) advanced to the final; others (10 boats) were eliminated.
- There was a single final, with 6 boats, to determine the medals and 4th–6th place.

== Schedule ==
Date	Time	Round
Wednesday, 12 August 1936	15:00	Semifinals
Thursday, 13 August 1936	14:00	Repechage
Friday, 14 August 1936	14:30	Final

== Results ==
=== Semifinals ===
The first boat of each heat qualified for the final, while the remainder went to the repechage.

==== Semifinal 1 ====
Rank	Rowers	Coxswain	Nation	Time	Notes
1	Mak Schoorl; Hotse Bartlema; Flip Regout; Simon de Wit	Gerard Hallie	Netherlands	6:59.0	Q
2	Nelson Ribeiro; Álvaro de Sá Freire; José de Campos; Wilson de Freitas	Henrique Camargo	Brazil	7:01.3	R
3	Chikara Shirasaka; Taichi Yamada; Takashi Hatakeyama; Yoichi Endo	Taro Teshima	Japan	7:03.2	R
4	Hans Mikkelsen; Gunnar Ibsen Sørensen; Flemming Jensen; Svend Aage Holm Sørensen	Aage Jensen	Denmark	7:04.5	R
5	František Maloň; Alfred Lerbretier; Jan Matoušek; Jaroslav Mysliveček	Josef Jabor	Czechoslovakia	7:04.7	R
6	Erik Johansson; Carl Sjöblom; Lars Larsson; Harry Sköld	Sven Tisell	Sweden	7:21.5	R

==== Semifinal 2 ====
Rank	Rowers	Coxswain	Nation	Time	Notes
1	Hans Maier; Walter Volle; Ernst Gaber; Paul Söllner	Fritz Bauer	Germany	6:41.1	Q
2	Fernand Vandernotte; Marcel Vandernotte; Jean Cosmat; Marcel Chauvigné	Noël Vandernotte	France	6:45.0	R
3	Stipe Krnčević; Rade Sunara; Vice Jurišić; Ćiril Ban	Pavao Ljubičić	Yugoslavia	6:50.2	R
4	William Haskins; Roger W. Cutler Jr.; J. Paul Austin; Robert B. Cutler	Edward Bennett	United States	6:50.5	R
5	Włodzimierz Zawadzki; Bronisław Karwecki; Stanisław Kuryłłowicz; Witalis Leporowski	Jerzy Skolimowski	Poland	6:50.5	R

==== Semifinal 3 ====
Rank	Rowers	Coxswain	Nation	Time	Notes
1	Hermann Betschart; Hans Homberger; Alex Homberger; Karl Schmid	Rolf Spring	Switzerland	6:41.9	Q
2	Valerio Perentin; Giliante D'Este; Nicolò Vittori; Umberto Vittori	Renato Petronio	Italy	6:50.2	
3	Miklós Mihó; Vilmos Éden; Ákos Inotay; Alajos Szilassy	László Molnár	Hungary	6:58.8	
4	León Sánchez; Juan Andrés Dutra; Julio Flebbe; Francisco Sunara	Isidoro Alonso	Uruguay	6:59.8	
5	René Vingerhoet; Harry Peeters; Paul Siebels; Willy Collet	Jean De Rode	Belgium	7:08.5	

=== Repechage ===
The first boat in each heat qualified for the final.

==== Repechage heat 1 ====
Rank	Rowers	Coxswain	Nation	Time	Notes
1	Hans Mikkelsen; Gunnar Ibsen Sørensen; Flemming Jensen; Svend Aage Holm Sørensen	Aage Jensen	Denmark	8:09.1	Q
2	Chikara Shirasaka; Taichi Yamada; Takashi Hatakeyama; Yoichi Endo	Taro Teshima	Japan	8:14.4	
3	František Maloň; Alfred Lerbretier; Jan Matoušek; Jaroslav Mysliveček	Josef Jabor	Czechoslovakia	8:20.9	
4	Nelson Ribeiro; Álvaro de Sá Freire; José de Campos; Wilson de Freitas	Henrique Camargo	Brazil	8:26.0	
5	Erik Johansson; Carl Sjöblom; Lars Larsson; Harry Sköld	Sven Tisell	Sweden	8:34.4	

==== Repechage heat 2 ====
Rank	Rowers	Coxswain	Nation	Time	Notes
1	Miklós Mihó; Vilmos Éden; Ákos Inotay; Alajos Szilassy	László Molnár	Hungary	8:08.4	Q
2	Włodzimierz Zawadzki; Bronisław Karwecki; Stanisław Kuryłłowicz; Witalis Leporowski	Jerzy Skolimowski	Poland	8:12.2	
3	Valerio Perentin; Giliante D'Este; Nicolò Vittori; Umberto Vittori	Renato Petronio	Italy	8:15.4	
4	Stipe Krnčević; Rade Sunara; Vice Jurišić; Ćiril Ban	Pavao Ljubičić	Yugoslavia	8:25.1	

==== Repechage heat 3 ====
Rank	Rowers	Coxswain	Nation	Time	Notes
1	Fernand Vandernotte; Marcel Vandernotte; Jean Cosmat; Marcel Chauvigné	Noël Vandernotte	France	8:00.6	Q
2	William Haskins; Roger W. Cutler Jr.; J. Paul Austin; Robert B. Cutler	Edward Bennett	United States	8:06.4	
3	León Sánchez; Juan Andrés Dutra; Julio Flebbe; Francisco Sunara	Isidoro Alonso	Uruguay	8:08.3	
4	René Vingerhoet; Harry Peeters; Paul Siebels; Willy Collet	Jean De Rode	Belgium	8:27.4	

=== Final ===
Rank	Rowers	Coxswain	Nation	Time
1st place, gold medalist(s)	Hans Maier; Walter Volle; Ernst Gaber; Paul Söllner	Fritz Bauer	Germany	7:16.2
2nd place, silver medalist(s)	Hermann Betschart; Hans Homberger; Alex Homberger; Karl Schmid	Rolf Spring	Switzerland	7:24.3
3rd place, bronze medalist(s)	Fernand Vandernotte; Marcel Vandernotte; Jean Cosmat; Marcel Chauvigné	Noël Vandernotte	France	7:33.3
4	Mak Schoorl; Hotse Bartlema; Flip Regout; Simon de Wit	Gerard Hallie	Netherlands	7:34.7
5	Miklós Mihó; Vilmos Éden; Ákos Inotay; Alajos Szilassy	László Molnár	Hungary	7:35.6
6	Hans Mikkelsen; Gunnar Ibsen Sørensen; Flemming Jensen; Svend Aage Holm Sørensen	Aage Jensen	Denmark	7:40.4
