= Sweden at the 1936 Summer Olympics =

- IOC code: SWE
- NOC: Swedish Olympic Committee

in Berlin
- Competitors: 171 in 17 sports
- Flag bearer: Bo Lindman
- Medals Ranked 7th: Gold 6 Silver 5 Bronze 9 Total 20

Summer Olympics appearances (overview)
- 1896; 1900; 1904; 1908; 1912; 1920; 1924; 1928; 1932; 1936; 1948; 1952; 1956; 1960; 1964; 1968; 1972; 1976; 1980; 1984; 1988; 1992; 1996; 2000; 2004; 2008; 2012; 2016; 2020; 2024

Other related appearances
- 1906 Intercalated Games

Sweden competed at the 1936 Summer Olympics in Berlin, Germany. 171 competitors, 163 men and 8 women, took part in 84 events in 17 sports.

== Medalists ==
Medal	Name	Sport	Event
Gold	Erik Bladström; Sven Johansson	Canoeing	Men's F2 10000 m
Gold	Torsten Ullman	Shooting	Men's free pistol
Gold	Rudolf Svedberg	Wrestling (Greco-Roman)	Men's welterweight
Gold	Ivar Johansson	Wrestling (Greco-Roman)	Men's middleweight
Gold	Axel Cadier	Wrestling (Greco-Roman)	Men's light-heavyweight
Gold	Knut Fridell	Wrestling (freestyle)	Men's light-Heavyweight
Silver	Gösta Almgren; Birger Cederin; Hans Drakenberg; Gustaf Dyrssen; Hans Granfelt; Sven Thofelt	Fencing	Men's team épée
Silver	Egon Svensson	Wrestling (Greco-Roman)	Men's bantamweight
Silver	John Nyman	Wrestling (Greco-Roman)	Men's heavyweight
Silver	Thure Andersson	Wrestling (freestyle)	Men's welterweight
Silver	Arvid Laurin; Uno Wallentin	Sailing	Men's star class
Bronze	Henry Jonsson	Athletics	Men's 5000 m
Bronze	Fred Warngård	Athletics	Men's Hammer throw
Bronze	Erik Ågren	Boxing	Men's lightweight
Bronze	Tage Fahlborg; Helge Larsson	Canoeing	Men's K2 10000 m
Bronze	Gregor Adlercreutz; Sven Colliander; Folke Sandström	Equestrian	Team dressage
Bronze	Torsten Ullman	Shooting	Men's rapid-fire pistol
Bronze	Einar Karlsson	Wrestling (Greco-Roman)	Men's featherweight
Bronze	Gösta Jönsson	Wrestling (freestyle)	Men's featherweight
Bronze	Lennart Ekdahl; Martin Hindorff; Torsten Lord; Dagmar Salén; Sven Salén	Sailing	Men's 6 metre class

== Cycling ==
Five cyclists, all men, represented Sweden in 1936.

Individual road race

- Arne Berg
- Berndt Carlsson
- Ingvar Ericsson
- Sven Johansson

Team road race

- Arne Berg
- Berndt Carlsson
- Ingvar Ericsson
- Sven Johansson

Time trial

- Jonas Persson

== Diving ==
Men

Athlete	Event	Final	
Athlete	Event	Points	Rank
Gösta Ölander	10 m platform	76.84	23

Women

Athlete	Event	Final	
Athlete	Event	Points	Rank
Ann-Margret Nirling	10 m platform	29.20	10
Ingeborg Sjöqvist	10 m platform	29.67	9

== Fencing ==
13 fencers, 11 men and 2 women, represented Sweden in 1936.

Men's foil

- Bengt Ljungquist
- Ivar Tingdahl
- Hubert de Bèsche

Men's épée

- Hans Drakenberg
- Hans Granfelt
- Gustaf Dyrssen

Men's team épée

- Hans Granfelt, Sven Thofelt, Gustav Almgren, Gustaf Dyrssen, Hans Drakenberg, Birger Cederin

Men's sabre

- Ivar Tingdahl
- Hubert de Bèsche
- Bengt Ljungquist

Men's team sabre

- Bengt Ljungquist, Knut Nordholm, Hubert de Bèsche, Ivar Tingdahl, Carl Johan Wachtmeister

Women's foil

- Berit Granquist
- Ebba Gripenstedt

== Football ==
Summary

Key:

- W – Win D – Draw L – Loss
- A.E.T – After extra time.
- RP – Game replayed

Team	Event	First round	Quarterfinal	Semifinal	Final / BM	
Team	Event	Opposition Score	Opposition Score	Opposition Score	Opposition Score	Rank
Sweden men's	Men's tournament	Japan; L 2–3	Did not advance			=9

Round of 16

4 August 1936
17:30

Japan	3–2	Sweden
Kamo 49'; Ukon 62'; Matsunaga 85'	Report	Persson 24', 37'

Hertha-BSC Field, Berlin
Attendance: 5,000
Referee: Wilhelm Peters (Germany)

== Modern pentathlon ==
Three male pentathletes represented Sweden in 1936.

- Sven Thofelt
- Georg von Boisman
- Ebbe Gyllenstierna

== Rowing ==
Sweden had five rowers participate in one out of seven rowing events in 1936.

Men's coxed four

- Erik Johansson
- Carl Sjöblom
- Lars Larsson
- Harry Sköld
- Sven Tisell (cox)

== Shooting ==
Seven shooters represented Sweden in 1936. Torsten Ullman won a gold medal in 50 m pistol and a bronze in the 25 m pistol.

25 m rapid fire pistol

- Torsten Ullman
- Helge Meuller
- Henrik Lönnberg

50 m pistol

- Torsten Ullman
- Helge Meuller
- Gustaf Bergström

50 m rifle, prone

- Bertil Rönnmark
- Erland Koch
- Karl August Larsson

== Swimming ==
Men

Ranks given are within the heat.

Athlete	Event	Heat		Semifinal		Final	
Athlete	Event	Time	Rank	Time	Rank	Time	Rank
Björn Borg	100 m backstroke	1:15.2	3 Q	1:16.3	8	Did not advance	
Björn Borg; Sten-Olof Bolldén; Sven-Pelle Pettersson; Gunnar Werner	4 × 200 m freestyle relay	—N/a		9:35.3	3 q	9:37.5	8

Women

Ranks given are within the heat.

Athlete	Event	Heat		Semifinal		Final	
Athlete	Event	Time	Rank	Time	Rank	Time	Rank
Kerstin Isberg	200 m breaststroke	3:08.7	2 Q	3:11.4	4	Did not advance	

== Water polo ==
Summary

Team	Event	First round				Semifinal			Final		Rank
Team	Event	Opposition Result	Opposition Result	Opposition Result	Rank	Opposition Result	Opposition Result	Rank	Opposition Result	Opposition Result	Rank
Sweden men	Men's tournament	Austria; L 1–2	Iceland; W 11–0	Switzerland; W 6–0	2 Q	France; L 1–2	Germany; L 1–4	4	Great Britain; W 4–2	Netherlands; L 3–4	7
