= Vandernotte =

Vandernotte is a surname. Notable people with the surname include:

- Fernand Vandernotte (1902–1990), French rower, brother of Marcel
- Marcel Vandernotte (1909–1993), French rower
- Noël Vandernotte (1923–2020), French rower, son of Fernand
