= Jean Cosmat =

French rower (1910–2010)

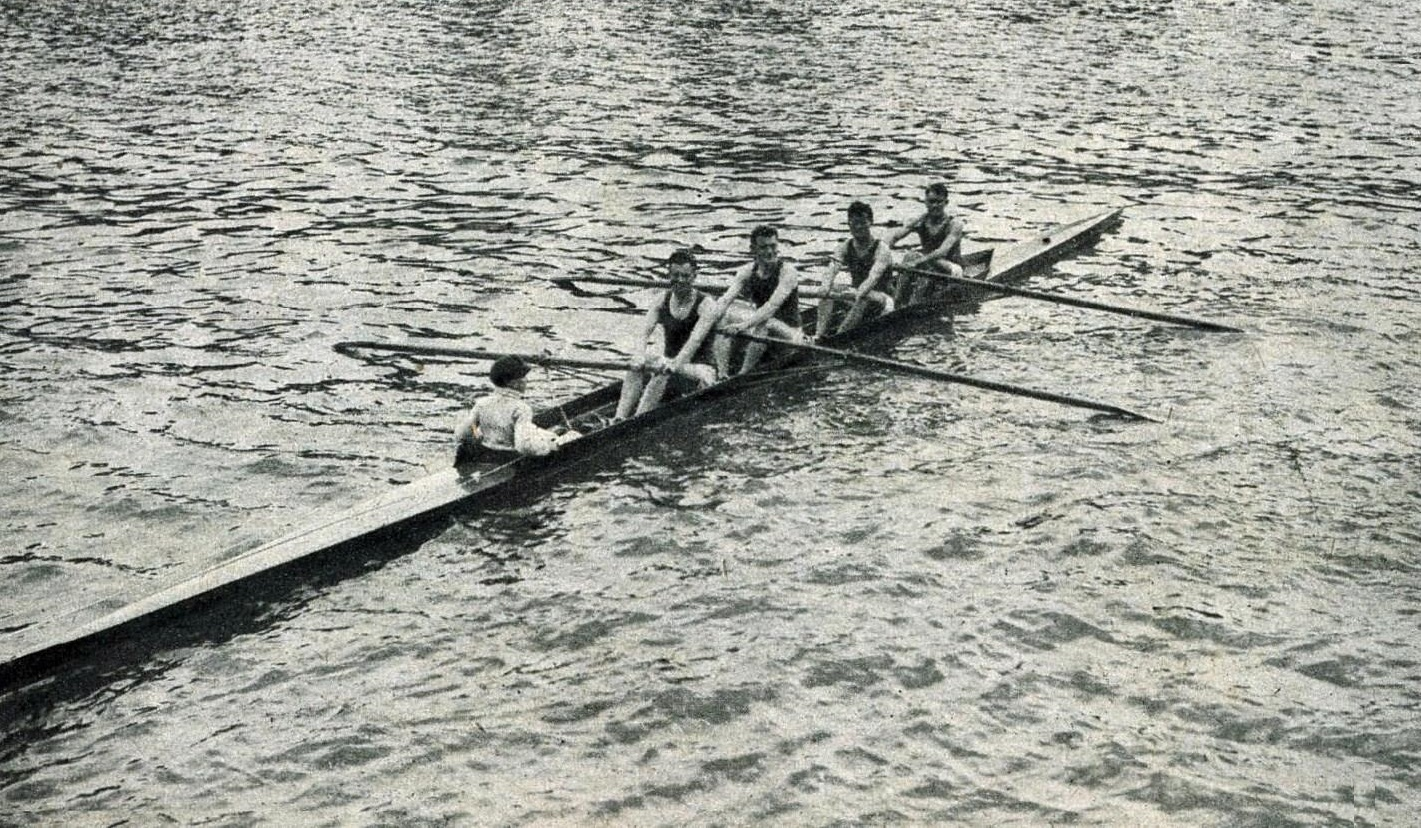
- Coxed four in July 1936 (from left): Noël Vandernotte (cox), Fernand and Marcel Vandernotte, Cosmat, and Marcel Chauvigné

Personal information
- Born: 3 July 1910 Nantes, France
- Died: 29 March 2010 (aged 99) Nantes, France

Sport
- Sport: Rowing
- Club: CA Nantes
Medal record
Men's rowing
Representing FRA
Olympic Games
Bronze medal – third place	1936 Berlin	Coxed four
European Rowing Championships
Silver medal – second place	1934 Lucerne	Coxed four

Jean Georges Cosmat (3 July 1910 – 29 March 2010) was a French rower who competed in the 1936 Summer Olympics.

In 1936 he won the bronze medal as crew member of the French boat in the coxed four competition.
