= 1933 European Rowing Championships =

- Venue: Danube
- Location: Budapest, Hungary
- Dates: August

The 1933 European Rowing Championships were rowing championships held on the Danube in the Hungarian capital city of Budapest. The competition was for men only and they competed in all seven Olympic boat classes (M1x, M2x, M2-, M2+, M4-, M4+, M8+).

== Medal summary ==
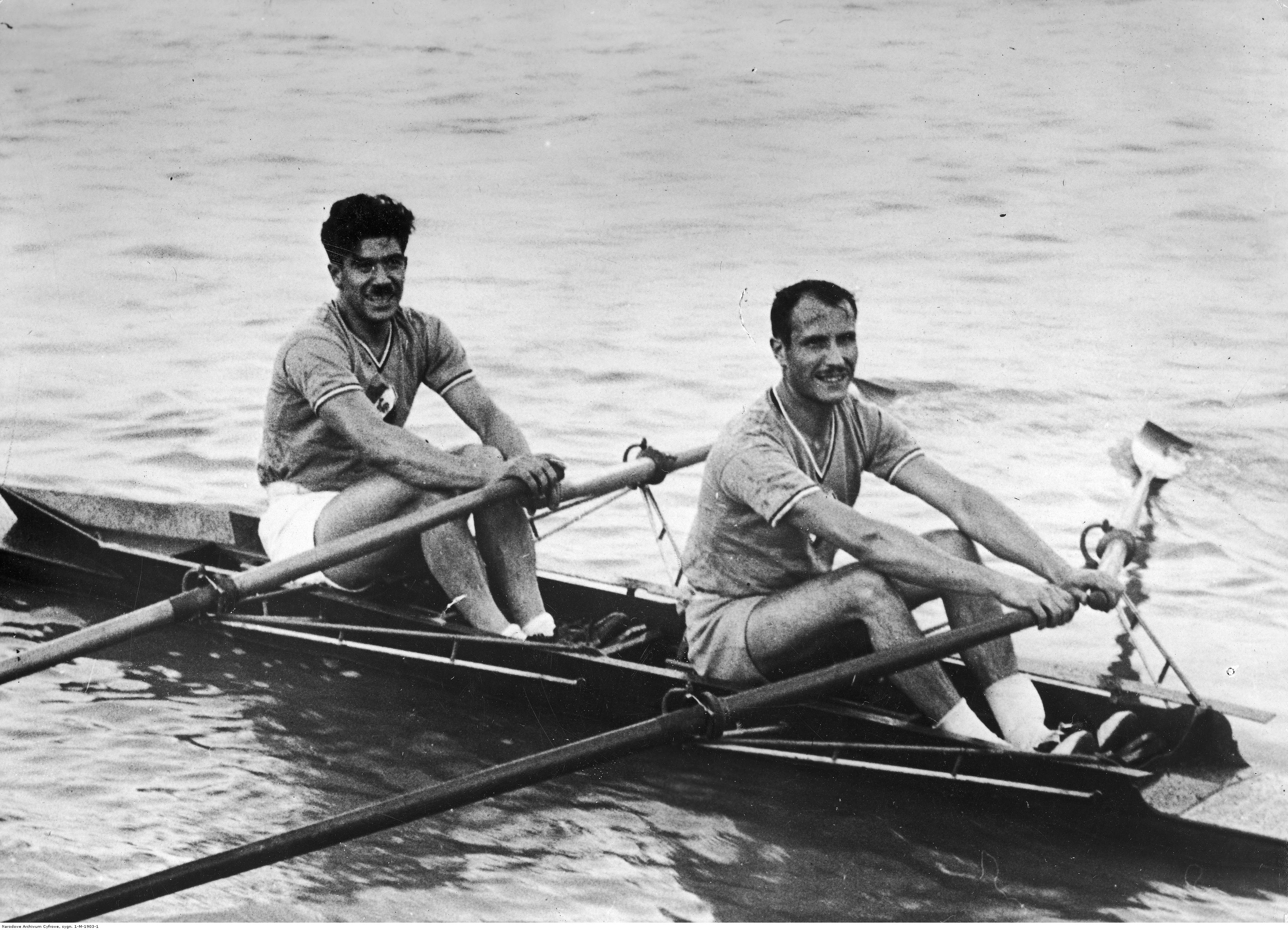
The French double scull team won gold

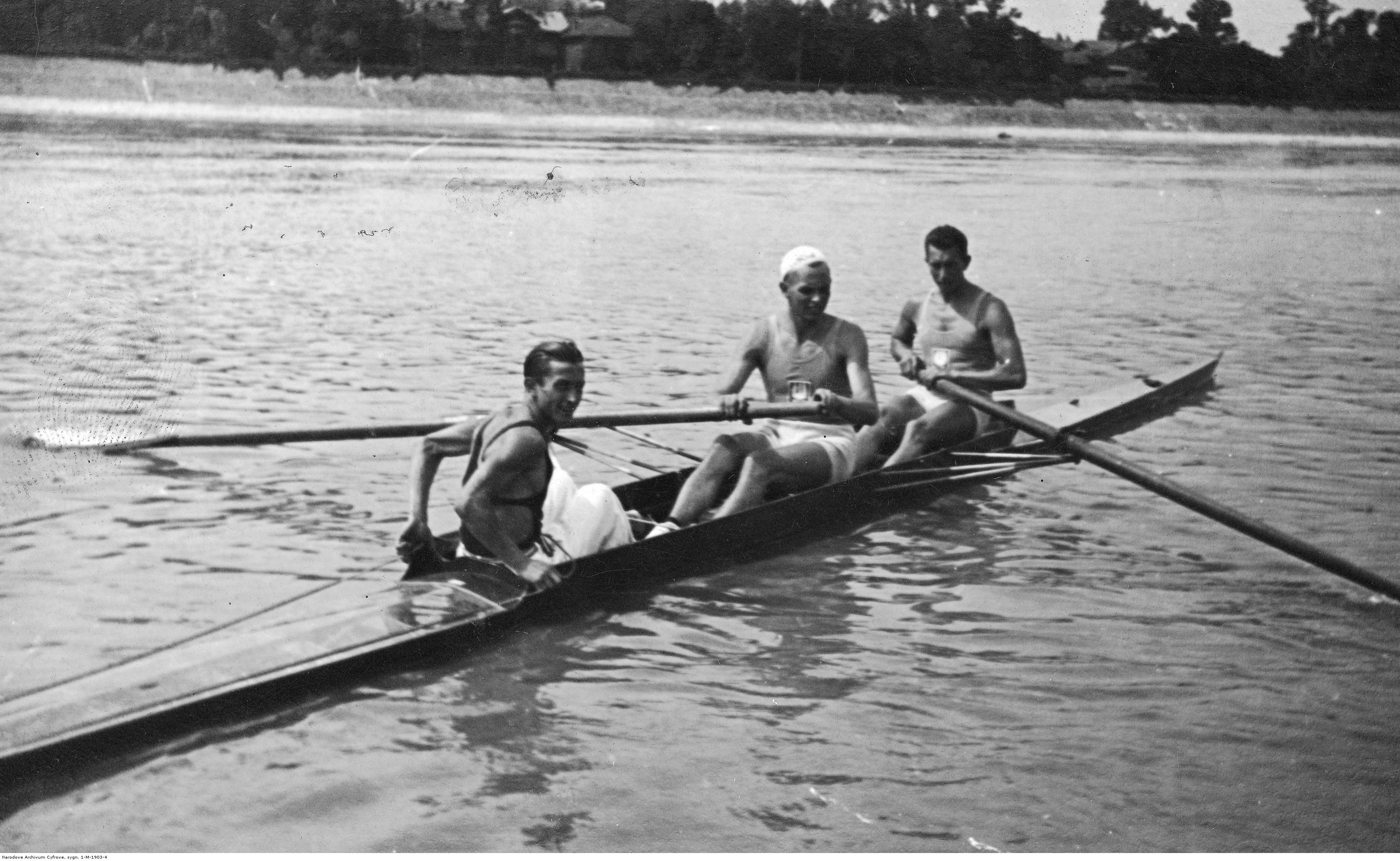
The Polish coxed pair won silver

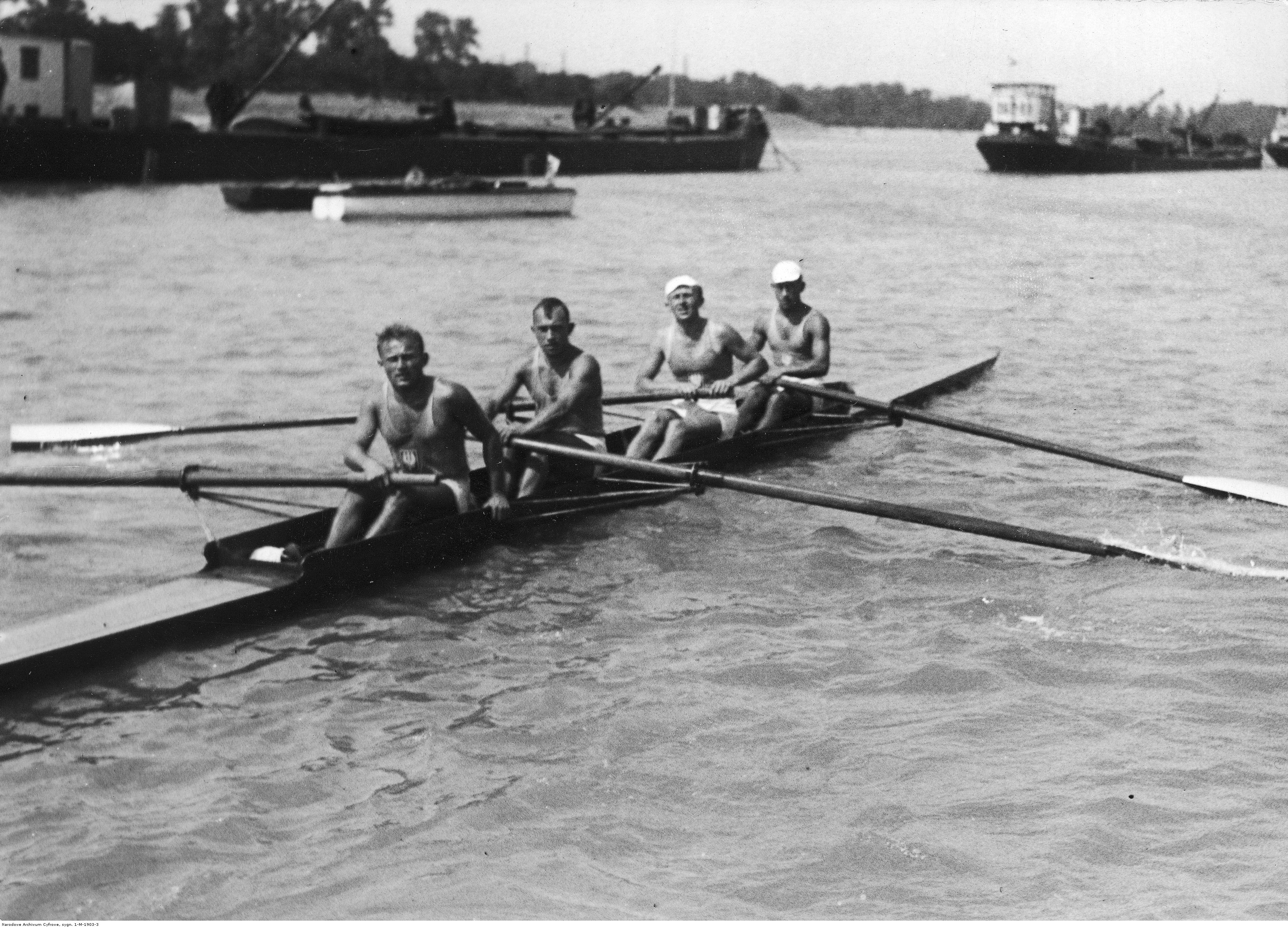
The Polish coxless four finished outside the medals

Event	Gold		Silver		Bronze	
Event	Country & rowers	Time	Country & rowers	Time	Country & rowers	Time
M1x	Poland; Roger Verey		Switzerland; Eugen Studach		Italy; Vincenzo Giacomini	
M2x	France; Georges Frisch; Louis Hansotte		Italy; Mario Moretti; Orfeo Paroli		Hungary; Béla Szendey; Andras Szendey	
M2-	Hungary; Gusztáv Götz; Tibor Machan		Switzerland; Karl Schmid; Ernst Rufli		Netherlands; A. A. Dekker; Willem Hendrik Jens	
M2+	Hungary; Károly Győry; Tibor Mamusich; László Goreczky (cox)		Poland; Janusz Ślązak; Jerzy Braun; Jerzy Skolimowski (cox)		France; Marcel Vandernotte; Fernand Vandernotte; Joie (cox)	
M4-	Denmark; Aage Hansen; Christian Olsen; Walther Christiansen; Richard Olsen		Netherlands; F. Moltzer; Godfried Roëll; J.C.J. Storm van's Gravensande; W.A.P.F.L. Storm van's Gravensande		Hungary; László Bartók; Árpád Kauser; Alajos Szilassy; Zoltán Török	
M4+	Italy; Valerio Perentin; Francesco Chicco; Nicolò Vittori; Umberto Vittori; Renato Petronio (cox)		Hungary; Hugó Ballya; Frigyes Hollósi; Károly Gyurkóczy ? Ervin Kereszthy (cox)		Czechoslovakia; Jiří Žába; František Vrba; Antonín Burda; Václav Černý; Josef Jabor (cox)	
M8+	Hungary; István Tóth; Miklós Krassy; Gábor Alapy; György Kozma; Hugó Ballya; Frigyes Hollósi; László Szabó; Károly Gyurkóczy; László Molnár (cox)		Italy; Renato Barbieri; Ottorino Godini; Renato Bracci; Dino Barsotti; Dante Secchi; Guglielmo Del Bimbo; Enrico Garzelli; Mario Balleri; Cesare Milani (cox)		Yugoslavia; Milan Blacse; Branko Alujevič; Vice Jurišić; Stipe Krnčević; Slavko Rosa; Joszip Rosa; Spiro Grubišić; Linardo Bujas; Ante Soltisek (cox)	
