= Buhtz =

Buhtz is a surname. Notable people with the surname include:

- Herbert Buhtz (1911–2006), German rower
- Horst Buhtz (1923–2015), German footballer and manager
