= Flemming Jensen =

Flemming Jensen may refer to the following Danish rowers:

- Flemming Jensen (born 1914) (1914–1965), Olympic rower at the 1936 Berlin Olympics
- Flemming Jensen (fl. 1980s), World Rowing Championships medallist during the 1980s
