= Erik Johansson =

Erik Johansson may refer to:

- Erik Johansson Vasa (1470–1520), Swedish nobleman
- Erik Johansson (rower) (1911–1961), Swedish Olympic rower
- Karl-Erik Johansson (1924–1987), Finnish rower
- Erik Johansson (ice hockey) (1927–1992), Swedish ice hockey player
- Erik Johansson, a former member of the Swedish Riksdag (1973–1979) with the Centre Party
- Erik Johansson (orienteer), Swedish gold medallist at the 1976 World Orienteering Championships
- Erik Johansson (footballer, born 1976), Swedish retired football midfielder
- Erik Johansson (pentathlete), Swedish pentathlete at the 2004 Summer Olympics
- Erik Johansson (artist) (born 1985), Swedish photographic surrealist
- Erik Johansson (racing driver) (born 1996), Swedish racing driver
- Erkki Kaila (1867–1944), previously Erik Johansson, Archbishop of Turku
- Erik Berg (footballer) (born 1988), né Johansson, Swedish footballer

== See also ==
- Eric Johansson (disambiguation)
