= Rowing at the 1932 Summer Olympics – Men's double sculls =

Men's double sculls at the Games of the X Olympiad
- Venue: Long Beach Marine Stadium
- Date: August 9–13, 1932
- Competitors: 10 from 5 nations
- Winning time: 7:14.4

Medalists
1st place, gold medalist(s)		William Gilmore; Ken Myers	United States
2nd place, silver medalist(s)		Gerhard Boetzelen; Herbert Buhtz	Germany
3rd place, bronze medalist(s)		Noël de Mille; Charles Pratt	Canada

The men's double sculls competition at the 1932 Summer Olympics in Los Angeles took place are at the Long Beach Marine Stadium.

== Schedule ==
Date	Round
Tuesday, August 9, 1932	Heats
Thursday, August 11, 1932	Repechage
Saturday, August 13, 1932	Final

== Results ==
=== Heats ===
First boat of each heat qualified to the final, remainder goes to the repechage.

==== Heat 1 ====
Rank	Rowers	Country	Time	Notes
1	Noël de Mille; Charles Pratt	Canada	7:25.0	Q
2	Mario Moretti; Orfeo Paroli	Italy	7:33.0	R
3	Adamor Gonçalves; Henrique Tomassini	Brazil	7:38.8	R

==== Heat 2 ====
Rank	Rowers	Country	Time	Notes
1	William Gilmore; Ken Myers	United States	6:16.31	Q
2	Gerhard Boetzelen; Herbert Buhtz	Germany	7:21.4	R

=== Repechage ===
First two qualify to the final.

Rank	Rowers	Country	Time	Notes
1	Gerhard Boetzelen; Herbert Buhtz	Germany	7:28.4	Q
2	Mario Moretti; Orfeo Paroli	Italy	7:33.2	Q
3	Adamor Gonçalves; Henrique Tomassini	Brazil	7:57.8	

=== Final ===
Rank	Rowers	Country	Time	Notes
1st place, gold medalist(s)	William Gilmore; Ken Myers	United States	7:17.4	
2nd place, silver medalist(s)	Gerhard Boetzelen; Herbert Buhtz	Germany	7:22.8	
3rd place, bronze medalist(s)	Noël de Mille; Charles Pratt	Canada	7:27.6	
4	Mario Moretti; Orfeo Paroli	Italy	7:49.2	
