= Gerhard Boetzelen =

German rower

Olympic medal record

Men's rowing
Silver medal – second place	1932 Los Angeles	Double sculls

Gerhard Boetzelen (7 January 1906 – 27 February 1995) was a German rower who competed in the 1932 Summer Olympics.

In 1932 he won the silver medal with his partner Herbert Buhtz in the double sculls competition.
