= Alfred Lerbletier =

Czech rower

Personal information
- Nationality: Czech
- Born: 5 April 1912 Slavkov u Brna, Moravia, Austria-Hungary
- Died: 5 July 1962 (aged 50)

Sport
- Country: Czechoslovakia
- Sport: Rowing
- Event: Coxed four

Alfred Lerbletier (5 April 1912 – 5 July 1962) was a Czech rower. He competed for Czechoslovakia in the men's coxed four at the 1936 Summer Olympics in Berlin, Germany.
