= Edward Bennett (rower) =

American rower

Personal information
- Born: September 25, 1915 Melrose, Massachusetts, United States
- Died: February 9, 1997 (aged 81) Marblehead, Massachusetts, United States

Sport
- Sport: Rowing

Edward Bennett (September 25, 1915 – February 9, 1997) was an American rower. He competed in the men's coxed four at the 1936 Summer Olympics. He graduated from Harvard College.
