= Walter Volle =

German rower

Personal information
- Born: 18 September 1913 Mannheim, German Empire
- Died: 27 October 2002 (aged 89) Berlin, Germany

Sport
- Sport: Rowing
- Club: Ludwigshafener RV
Medal record
Men's rowing
Representing Nazi Germany
Olympic Games
Gold medal – first place	1936 Berlin	Coxed four
European Rowing Championships
Silver medal – second place	1937 Amsterdam	Eight
Gold medal – first place	1938 Milan	Eight

Walter Volle (18 September 1913 – 27 October 2002) was a German rower, coach, and crew member in the German boat in the coxed four competition, winning the gold medal in the 1936 Summer Olympics.

Volle was born in Mannheim, Germany, in 1913, and died in Berlin in 2002.
