= Paul Siebels =

Belgian rower

Personal information
- Nationality: Belgian
- Born: 13 January 1912
- Died: 2 January 1988 (aged 75)

Sport
- Sport: Rowing

Paul Siebels (13 January 1912 – 2 January 1988) was a Belgian rower. He competed in the men's coxed four at the 1936 Summer Olympics.
