= Mario Moretti (rower) =

Italian rower

Personal information
- Born: 30 December 1906 Milan, Italy
- Died: 13 September 1977 (aged 70)
- Height: 170 cm (5 ft 7 in)

Sport
- Sport: Rowing
Medal record
Men's rowing
Representing Italy
European Rowing Championships
Silver medal – second place	1933 Budapest	Double sculls

Mario Moretti (30 December 1906 – 13 September 1977) was an Italian rower. He competed at the 1932 Summer Olympics in Los Angeles with the men's double sculls where they came fourth.
