= Josef Jabor =

Czechoslovak coxswain

Personal information
- Born: 1898
- Died: unknown

Sport
- Sport: Rowing
Medal record
Men's rowing
Representing Czechoslovakia
European Rowing Championships
Bronze medal – third place	1923 Como	Eight
Bronze medal – third place	1924 Zürich	Eight
Bronze medal – third place	1932 Belgrade	Eight
Bronze medal – third place	1933 Budapest	Coxed four

Josef Jabor (1898–?) was a Czechoslovak coxswain. He competed at the 1936 Summer Olympics in Berlin with the men's coxed four where they were eliminated in the semi-final.
