= Harry Peeters (rower) =

Belgian rower

Personal information
- Nationality: Belgian
- Born: 19 July 1920

Sport
- Sport: Rowing

Harry Peeters (born 19 July 1920, date of death unknown) was a Belgian rower. He competed in the men's coxed four at the 1936 Summer Olympics.
