= Umberto Vittori =

Italian rower

Personal information
- Born: 22 December 1906 Izola, Austria-Hungary
- Died: 27 October 1977 (aged 70)

Sport
- Sport: Rowing
Medal record
Men's rowing
Representing Italy
European Rowing Championships
Gold medal – first place	1933 Budapest	Coxed four
Bronze medal – third place	1935 Berlin	Coxed four

Umberto Vittori (22 December 1906 – 27 October 1977) was an Italian rower. Vittori was born in Izola in 1906, which at that time belonged to Austria-Hungary. After WWI, the town was part of Italy and Vittori represented that country. He competed at the 1936 Summer Olympics in Berlin with the men's coxed four where they were eliminated in the semi-final.
