= Vilmos Éden =

Hungarian rower (1914–1984)

Personal information
- Born: 22 September 1914 Vecsés, Hungary
- Died: 6 September 1984 (aged 69) Budapest, Hungary

Sport
- Sport: Rowing
- Club: Hungária Evezős Egylet
Medal record
Men's rowing
Representing Hungary
European Rowing Championships
Gold medal – first place	1934 Lucerne	Eight

Vilmos Éden (22 September 1914 – 6 September 1984) was a Hungarian rower. He competed at the 1936 Summer Olympics in Berlin with the men's coxed four where they came fifth.
