= Jaroslav Mysliveček =

Czech rower

Personal information
- Nationality: Czech
- Born: 1908

Sport
- Sport: Rowing

Jaroslav Mysliveček (born 1908, date of death unknown) was a Czech rower. He competed in the men's coxed four at the 1936 Summer Olympics.
