= Yoichi Endo =

Japanese rower (born 1916)

Personal information
- Nationality: Japanese
- Born: 9 March 1916

Sport
- Sport: Rowing

Yoichi Endo (遠藤 与一, Endō Yoichi, born 9 March 1916, date of death unknown) was a Japanese rower. He competed in the men's coxed four at the 1936 Summer Olympics. Endo is deceased.
