= Eric Johansson =

Eric Johansson may refer to:

- Eric Johansson (handballer) (born 2000), Swedish handball player
- Eric Johansson (ice hockey) (born 1982), Swedish-Canadian ice hockey player
- Eric Johansson (athlete) (1904–1972), Swedish hammer thrower
- Eric Johansson, former member of the Riksdag (1971–1973) with the Social Democratic Party
- Erik Johansson i Simrishamn, former member of the Riksdag (1971–1985) with the Social Democratic Party

== See also ==
- Erik Johansson (disambiguation)
