= Nelson Ribeiro =

Brazilian rower

Personal information
- Born: 14 January 1910; Rio de Janeiro, Brazil
- Died: 22 July 1973 (aged 63)

Sport
- Sport: Rowing

Nelson Ribeiro (14 January 1910 – 22 July 1973) was a Brazilian rower. He competed in the men's coxed four at the 1936 Summer Olympics.
