= Frigyes Hollósi =

Frigyes Hollósi may refer to:

- Frigyes Hollósi (actor) (1941–2012), Hungarian actor
- Frigyes Hollósi (sportsman) (1906–1979), Hungarian swimmer and rower
