= Julio Flebbe =

Uruguayan rower

Personal information
- Nationality: Uruguayan
- Born: 10 August 1908

Sport
- Sport: Rowing

Julio Flebbe (born 10 August 1908, date of death unknown) was a Uruguayan rower. He competed in the men's coxed four at the 1936 Summer Olympics.
