= René Vingerhoet =

Belgian rower

Personal information
- Nationality: Belgian
- Born: 27 August 1912; Brussels, Belgium
- Died: 3 September 2008 (aged 96); Ittre, Belgium

Sport
- Sport: Rowing

René Vingerhoet (27 August 1912 – 3 September 2008) was a Belgian rower. He competed in the men's coxed four at the 1936 Summer Olympics.
