= František Maloň =

Czech rower

Personal information
- Nationality: Czech
- Born: 12 March 1913

Sport
- Sport: Rowing

František Maloň (born 12 March 1913, date of death unknown) was a Czech rower. He competed in the men's coxed four at the 1936 Summer Olympics.
