= Alajos Szilassy =

Hungarian rower

Personal information
- Born: 19 October 1907 Oradea, Hungary
- Died: unknown

Sport
- Sport: Rowing
- Club: Hungária Evezős Egylet
Medal record
Men's rowing
Representing Hungary
European Rowing Championships
Silver medal – second place	1932 Belgrade	Eight
Bronze medal – third place	1933 Budapest	Coxless four
Gold medal – first place	1934 Lucerne	Eight

Alajos Szilassy (19 October 1907 – ?), also known as Alajos Szymiczek, was a Hungarian rower. He competed at the 1936 Summer Olympics in Berlin with the men's coxed four where they came fifth.
