= Gunnar Ibsen Sørensen =

Danish rower

Personal information
- Nationality: Danish
- Born: 27 June 1913; Thisted, Denmark
- Died: 10 May 2004 (aged 90)

Sport
- Sport: Rowing

Gunnar Ibsen Sørensen (27 June 1913 – 10 May 2004) was a Danish rower. He competed in the men's coxed four at the 1936 Summer Olympics.
