= 1936 Summer Olympics medal table =

1936 Summer Olympics medals
- Location: Berlin, Germany

Highlights
- Most gold medals: Germany (38)
- Most total medals: Germany (101)
- Medalling NOCs: 32

World map showing the medal achievements of each country during the 1936 Summer Olympics Legend: represents countries that won at least one gold medal. represents countries that won at least one silver medal but no gold medals. represents countries that won at least one bronze medal (no gold or silver). represents participating countries that did not win medals. represents entities that did not participate at the 1936 Summer Olympics.

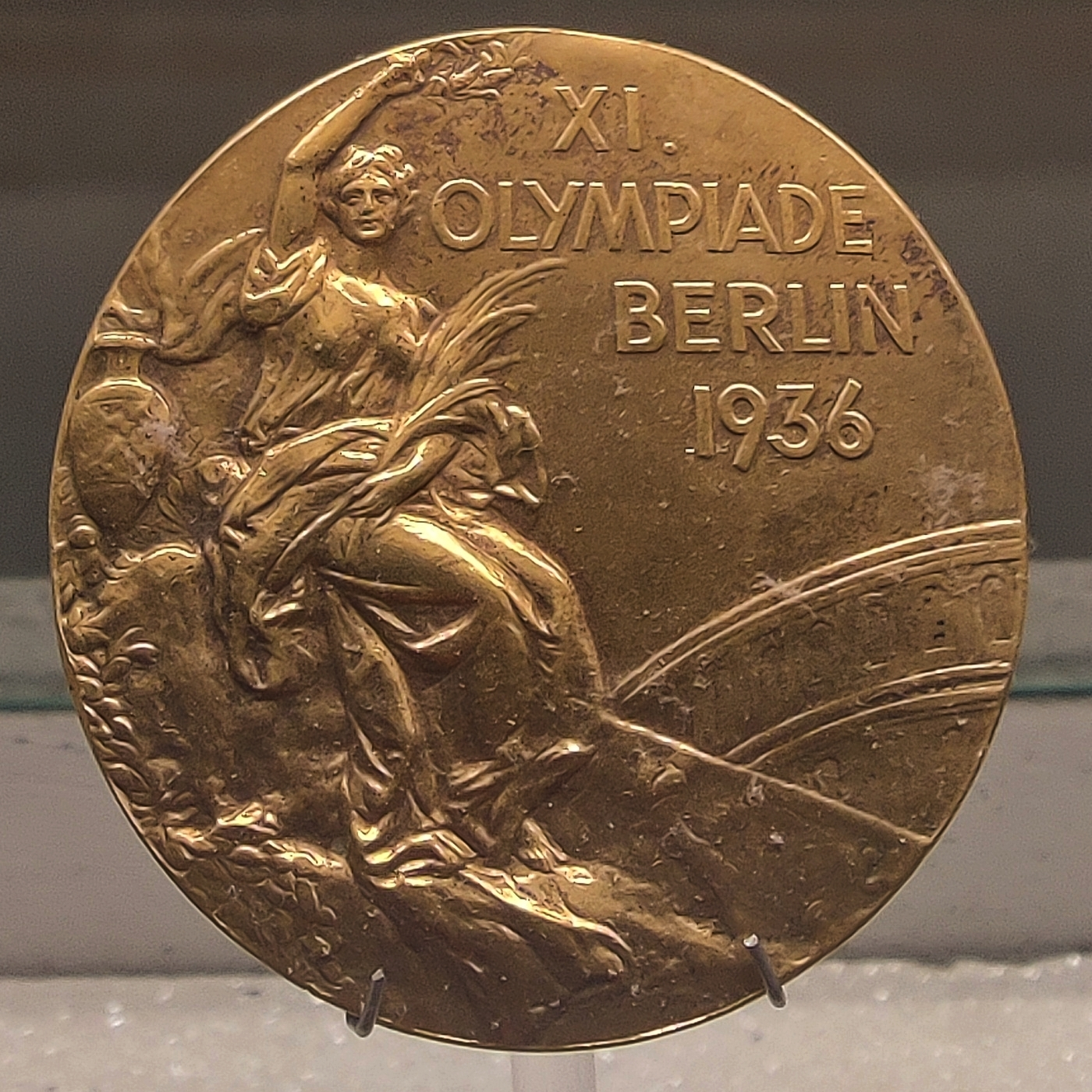
A gold medal from the 1936 Olympics

The 1936 Summer Olympics, officially known as the Games of the XI Olympiad, was an international multi-sport event held in Berlin, Germany, from 1 August to 16 August.

Berlin had previously been chosen to host the 1916 Summer Olympics, which were subsequently cancelled due to the First World War. The 1936 Games had 3,963 athletes from 49 National Olympic Committees (NOCs) participating in a total of 129 events in 19 sports. This was the highest number of nations represented at any Games to date. Athletes from 32 NOCs won medals, of which 21 secured at least one gold medal, and 17 NOCs won no medals. The host NOC, Germany, received a total of 101 medals (38 of them gold), the most of any nation and a record for a united German team, although East Germany broke that record in 1976, 1980 and 1988.

A boycott by the United States was suggested due to Germany's Nazi regime, but it was not implemented. The other NOCs which threatened to boycott the Games for the same reason were the United Kingdom, France, Sweden, Czechoslovakia and the Netherlands. An alternative People's Olympiad was planned to take place in Barcelona, Spain, but was cancelled at the last moment following the outbreak of the Spanish Civil War after the athletes had already begun to arrive. The civil war also meant that Spain's NOC did not compete at the 1936 Games. While no NOCs ended up boycotting the Games on anti-Nazi grounds, a multinational Jewish-led boycott of the Games took place, with an individual athlete refusing to take part. Also, the IAAFs' refusal to allow athletes from Northern Ireland to compete for the Irish Olympic Council in athletics events led the Irish Free State to boycott.

Marjorie Gestring became the youngest Olympic champion ever at the age of 13, (Note: In the 1900 men's coxed pair rowing, an unidentified boy aged 12 or less coxed the winning pair in the final; however, only semifinal cox Hermanus Brockmann is listed by the IOC. Winners received silver medals at the 1900 games.) winning a gold medal in the women's 3 meter springboard. As Korea was under Japanese rule, Korean athletes who hoped to compete in the Games were required to qualify for the Japanese team. Sohn Kee-chung, competing as Kitei Son, won gold in the marathon, which made him Japan's first gold medalist at these Games and the first Korean ever to win a medal. His fellow countryman Nam Sung-yong won the bronze medal in the same event.

== Medal table ==
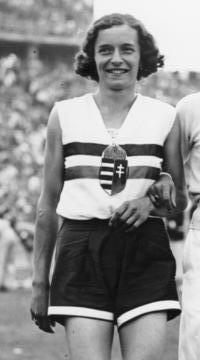
Ibolya Csák, gold medallist for Hungary in the women's high jump

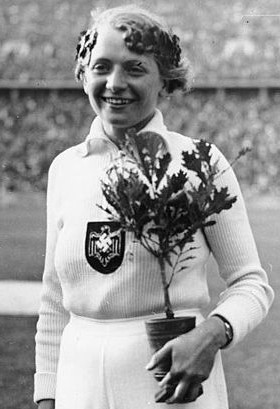
Tilly Fleischer, gold medallist for Germany in the women's javelin

The medal table is based on information provided by the International Olympic Committee (IOC) and is consistent with IOC convention in its published medal tables. The table uses the Olympic medal table sorting method. By default, the table is ordered by the number of gold medals the athletes from a nation have won, where 'nation' is an entity represented by a National Olympic Committee (NOC). The number of silver medals is taken into consideration next, and then the number of bronze medals. If teams are still tied, equal ranking is given and they are listed alphabetically by their IOC country code.

A dead heat in the lightweight section of the weightlifting competition resulted in gold medals being awarded to both Austria's Robert Fein and Egypt's Anwar Mesbah, and resulted in a silver medal not being awarded for that event. A dead heat for third place in the floor competition of the gymnastic events resulted in bronze medals going to both Germany's Konrad Frey and Eugen Mack of Switzerland. This resulted in 130 gold and bronze medals being awarded, but only 128 silver medals.

* Host nation (Germany)

1936 Summer Olympics medal table
Rank	NOC	Gold	Silver	Bronze	Total
1	Germany*	38	31	32	101
2	United States	24	21	12	57
3	Hungary	10	1	5	16
4	Italy	9	13	5	27
5	Finland	8	6	6	20
6	France	7	6	6	19
7	Sweden	6	5	10	21
8	Japan	6	4	10	20
9	Netherlands	6	4	7	17
10	Austria	5	7	5	17
11	Switzerland	4	9	5	18
12	Great Britain	4	7	3	14
13	Czechoslovakia	3	5	1	9
14	Argentina	2	2	3	7
14	Estonia	2	2	3	7
16	Egypt	2	1	2	5
17	Canada	1	3	5	9
18	Norway	1	3	2	6
19	Turkey	1	0	1	2
20	India	1	0	0	1
20	New Zealand	1	0	0	1
22	Poland	0	4	5	9
23	Denmark	0	2	3	5
24	Latvia	0	1	1	2
25	Romania	0	1	0	1
25	South Africa	0	1	0	1
25	Yugoslavia	0	1	0	1
28	Belgium	0	0	3	3
28	Mexico	0	0	3	3
30	Australia	0	0	1	1
30	Philippines	0	0	1	1
30	Portugal	0	0	1	1
Totals (32 entries)		141	140	141	422
