= Álvaro de Sá Freire =

Brazilian rower

Personal information
- Born: 2 March 1909; Rio de Janeiro, Brazil

Sport
- Sport: Rowing

Álvaro de Sá Freire (born 2 March 1909, date of death unknown) was a Brazilian rower. He competed in the men's coxed four at the 1936 Summer Olympics.
