= Ákos Inotay =

Hungarian rower

Personal information
- Born: 21 May 1911 Bačka Topola, Hungary
- Died: 17 March 1973 (aged 61) Budapest, Hungary

Sport
- Sport: Rowing
- Club: Hungária Evezős Egylet
Medal record
Men's rowing
Representing Hungary
European Rowing Championships
| Gold medal – first place | 1934 Lucerne | Eight |

Ákos Inotay (21 May 1911 – 17 March 1973) was a Hungarian rower. He competed at the 1936 Summer Olympics in Berlin with the men's coxed four where they came fifth.
