= Jean De Rode =

Belgian rower

Personal information
- Nationality: Belgian
- Born: 30 September 1913
- Died: 20 April 1986 (aged 72)

Sport
- Sport: Rowing

Jean De Rode (30 September 1913 – 20 April 1986) was a Belgian rower. He competed in the men's coxed four at the 1936 Summer Olympics.
