= Svend Aage Holm Sørensen =

Danish rower

Personal information
- Nationality: Danish
- Born: 15 April 1913; Copenhagen, Denmark
- Died: 29 April 2004 (aged 91); Hovedstaden, Denmark

Sport
- Sport: Rowing

Svend Aage Holm Sørensen (15 April 1913 – 29 April 2004) was a Danish rower. He competed in the men's coxed four at the 1936 Summer Olympics, where they placed 6th. His brother Willy Sørensen was also an Olympic Athlete.
