= Chikara Shirasaka =

Japanese rower

Personal information
- Nationality: Japanese
- Born: 18 August 1913

Sport
- Sport: Rowing

Chikara Shirasaka (born 18 August 1913, date of death unknown) was a Japanese rower. He competed in the men's coxed four at the 1936 Summer Olympics.
