= Henrique Tomassini =

Brazilian rower

Personal information
- Born: April 1899; Rio de Janeiro, Brazil
- Died: 13 June 1975 (aged 75–76)

Sport
- Sport: Rowing

Henrique Tomassini (April 1899 – 13 June 1975) was a Brazilian rower. He competed in the men's double sculls event at the 1932 Summer Olympics.
