= Orfeo Paroli =

Italian rower

Personal information
- Born: 11 April 1906 Milan, Italy
- Died: 5 September 1980 (aged 74)
- Height: 173 cm (5 ft 8 in)

Sport
- Sport: Rowing
Medal record
Men's rowing
Representing Italy
European Rowing Championships
Silver medal – second place	1933 Budapest	Double sculls

Orfeo Paroli (11 April 1906 – 5 September 1980) was an Italian rower. He competed at the 1932 Summer Olympics in Los Angeles with the men's double sculls where they came fourth.
