= Wilson de Freitas =

Brazilian rower

Personal information
- Nationality: Brazilian
- Born: 8 October 1910
- Died: 25 March 1945 (aged 34); Cachoeiro de Itapemirim, Brazil

Sport
- Sport: Rowing

Wilson de Freitas (8 October 1910 – 25 March 1945) was a Brazilian rower. He competed in the men's coxed four at the 1936 Summer Olympics.
