= Francisco Sunara =

Uruguayan rower

Personal information
- Nationality: Uruguayan
- Born: 11 November 1905

Sport
- Sport: Rowing

Francisco Sunara (born 11 November 1905, date of death unknown) was a Uruguayan rower. He competed in the men's coxed four at the 1936 Summer Olympics.
