= Noël de Mille =

Canadian rower

Olympic medal record

Men's rowing

Representing Canada
Bronze medal – third place	1932 Los Angeles	Double sculls

Noël James de Mille (29 November 1909 – 6 March 1995) was a Canadian rower who competed in the 1932 Summer Olympics where, together with Ned Pratt., he won the bronze medal in the double sculls. Noel later moved to England but continued a keen interest in rowing. When war broke out he joined the Royal Air Force, serving as a flying officer. Following the war he married and settled in Glasgow. De Mille had a successful business career in housewares manufacturing. He and his wife Ailsa Ogilvie had a daughter Christina and two sons Andy and Peter. In 1986, at the age of 75, he attended the centennial event at the Vancouver Rowing Club, where he stepped back into a double for a row with club captain Bruce Trewin. He died in Thorpness, Suffolk, in 1995.
