= Fritz Bauer (rowing) =

German rower (1906–1992)

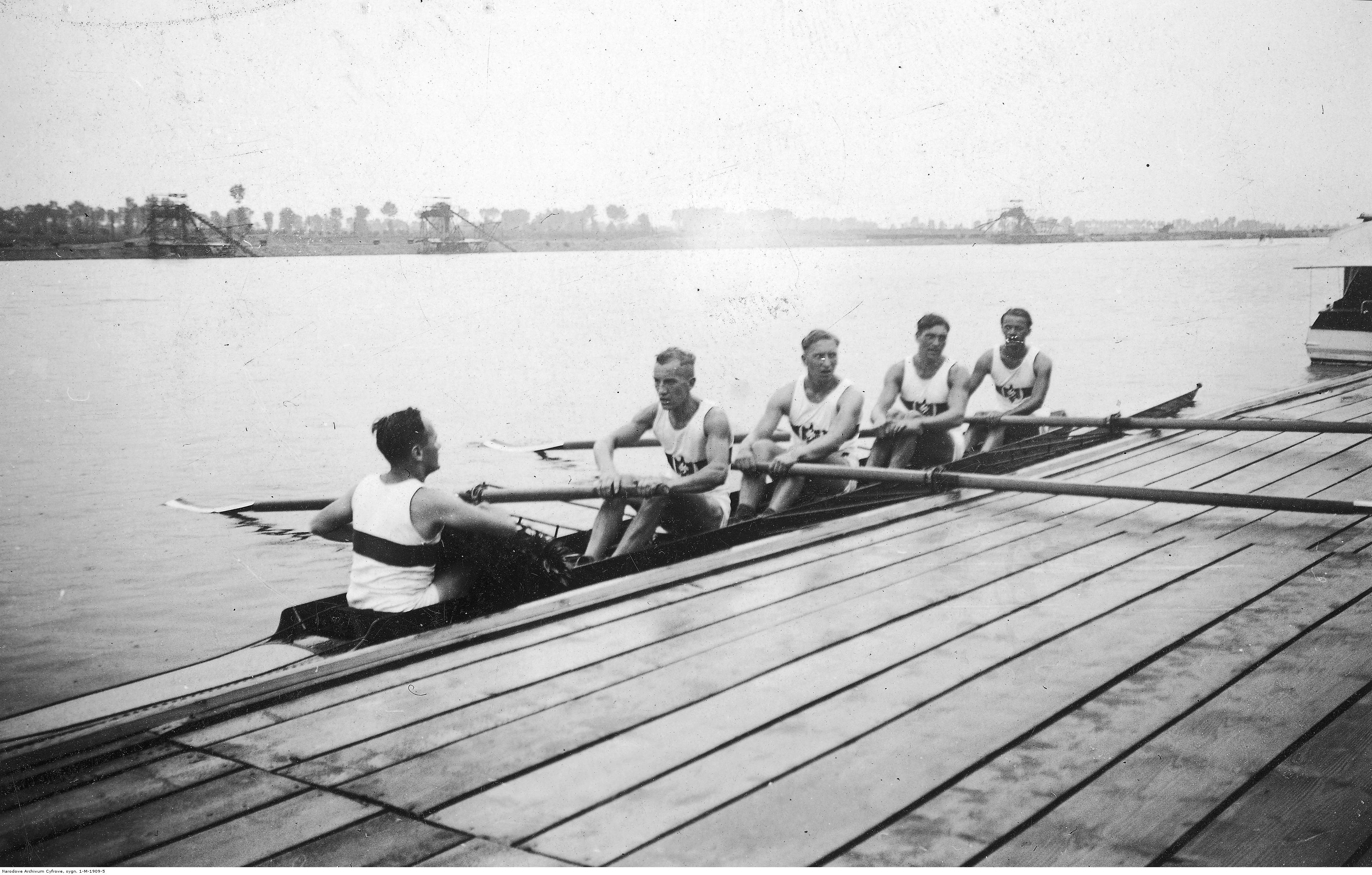
- Bauer (cox) at the 1938 European Championships

Personal information
- Born: 23 June 1906 Breslau, German Empire
- Died: 19 September 1992 (aged 86) Mannheim, Germany
- Height: 170 cm (5 ft 7 in)

Sport
- Sport: Rowing
Medal record
Men's rowing
Representing Nazi Germany
Olympic Games
Gold medal – first place	1936 Berlin	Coxed four
European Rowing Championships
Gold medal – first place	1938 Milan	Coxed four

Fritz Bauer (23 June 1906 – 19 September 1992) was a German coxswain who competed in the 1928 Summer Olympics, in the 1932 Summer Olympics, and in the 1936 Summer Olympics.

In 1928, he coxed the German boat which finished fifth after being eliminated in the quarter-finals of the eight event. Four years later he was again the coxswain of the German boat which was eliminated in the repechage of the eight event. In 1936, he won the gold medal as coxswain of the German boat in the coxed four competition.
