= Miklós Mihó =

Hungarian rower

Personal information
- Nationality: Hungarian
- Born: 27 May 1913
- Died: 26 August 1995 (aged 82)

Sport
- Sport: Rowing

Miklós Mihó (27 May 1913 – 26 August 1995) was a Hungarian rower. He competed in the men's coxed four at the 1936 Summer Olympics.
