= Gerard Hallie =

Dutch rower

Personal information
- Born: 24 October 1911 Zaandam, Netherlands
- Died: 7 July 2002 (aged 90) Geleen, Netherlands

Sport
- Sport: Rowing
- Club: Nereus
Medal record
Men's rowing
Representing Netherlands
European Rowing Championships
Silver medal – second place	1937 Amsterdam	Coxed four

Gerard Hallie (24 October 1911 – 7 July 2002) was a Dutch coxswain. He competed at the 1936 Summer Olympics in Berlin with the men's coxed four where they came fourth.
