= Hans Mikkelsen =

Danish rower (1914–2004)

Personal information
- Nationality: Danish
- Born: 24 March 1914 Copenhagen, Denmark
- Died: 25 February 2004 (aged 89) Frederiksberg, Denmark

Sport
- Sport: Rowing

Hans Mikkelsen (24 March 1914 – 25 February 2004) was a Danish rower. He competed in the men's coxed four at the 1936 Summer Olympics.
