= Renée Blondeau =

French swimmer

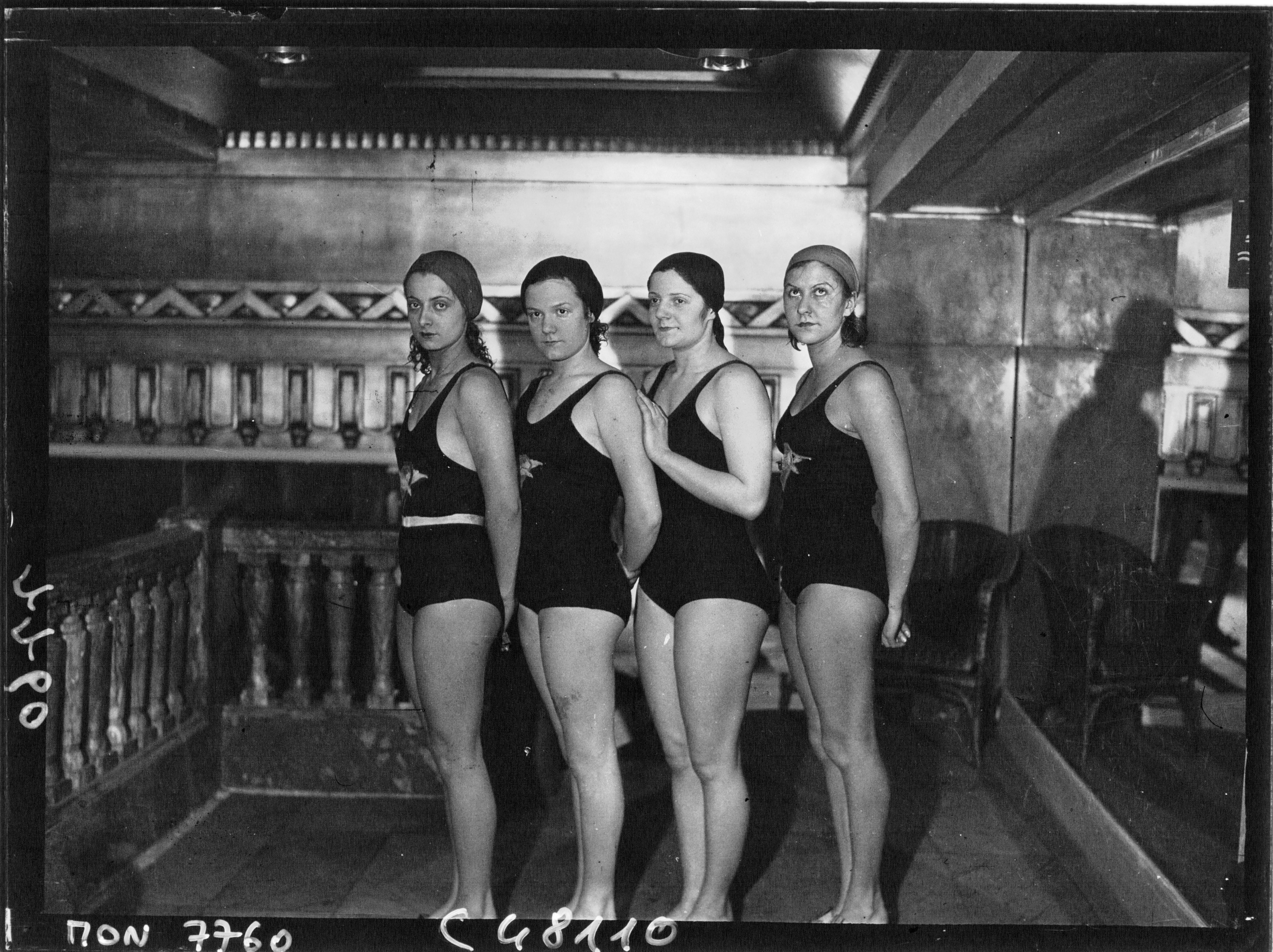
- (from l. to r.) Solita Salgado, Renée Blondeau, Thérèse Blondeau, Suzanne Imbert in 1935.

Personal information
- Nationality: French
- Born: 10 May 1918
- Died: 15 May 1969 (aged 51)

Sport
- Sport: Swimming

Renée Blondeau (10 May 1918 – 15 May 1969) was a French swimmer. She competed in the women's 100 metre freestyle at the 1936 Summer Olympics.
