= Jan Matoušek (rower) =

Czech rower

Personal information
- Nationality: Czech
- Born: 19 April 1915

Sport
- Sport: Rowing

Jan Matoušek (born 19 April 1915, date of death unknown) was a Czech rower. He competed in the men's coxed four at the 1936 Summer Olympics.
