= Juan Andrés Dutra =

Uruguayan Olympic rower (1913–1976)

Personal information
- Born: 29 October 1913; Montevideo, Uruguay
- Died: 5 March 1976 (aged 62)

Sport
- Sport: Rowing

Juan Andrés Dutra (29 October 1913 – 5 March 1976) was a Uruguayan rower. He competed in the men's coxed four at the 1936 Summer Olympics.
