= León Sánchez =

Uruguayan rower

Personal information
- Full name: León Sánchez Suarez
- Nationality: Uruguayan
- Born: 11 March 1905
- Died: 11 May 1981 (aged 76)

Sport
- Sport: Rowing

León Sánchez (11 March 1905 – 11 May 1981) was a Uruguayan rower. He competed in the men's coxed four at the 1936 Summer Olympics.
