= Isidoro Alonso =

Uruguayan rower

Personal information
- Born: 15 September 1896 Montevideo, Uruguay
- Died: 21 September 1962 (aged 66)

Sport
- Sport: Rowing

Isidoro Alonso (15 September 1896 – 21 September 1962) was a Uruguayan rower. He competed in the men's coxed four at the 1936 Summer Olympics.
