= Hotse Bartlema =

Dutch rower (1911–1987)

Personal information
- Born: Hotse Sjoerd Durk Bartlema; 1 May 1911 Schraard, Netherlands
- Died: 25 February 1987 (aged 75) Eindhoven, Netherlands

Sport
- Sport: Rowing
- Club: Nereus
Medal record
Men's rowing
Representing Netherlands
European Rowing Championships
Silver medal – second place	1937 Amsterdam	Coxed four

Hotse Sjoerd Durk Bartlema (1 May 1911 – 25 February 1987) was a Dutch rower. He competed at the 1936 Summer Olympics in Berlin with the men's coxed four where they came fourth.
