= Jerzy Skolimowski (rowing) =

Polish coxswain (1907–1985)

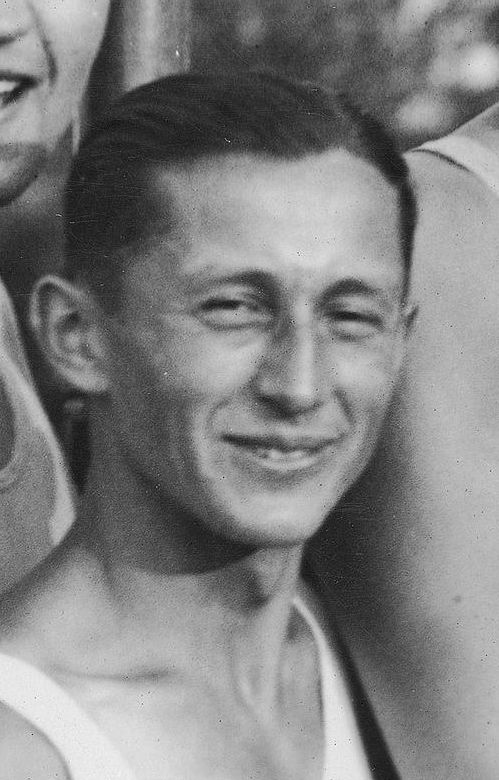
- Skolimowski in 1932

Personal information
- Born: Jerzy Walerian Skolimowski; 9 December 1907 Łuków, Congress Poland, Russian Empire
- Died: 12 February 1985 (aged 77) London, United Kingdom
- Height: 150 cm (4 ft 11 in)
- Weight: 59 kg (130 lb)

Sport
- Sport: Rowing
- Club: AZS Warszawa
Medal record
Men's rowing
Representing Poland
Olympic Games
| Silver medal – second place | 1932 Los Angeles | Coxed pair |
| Bronze medal – third place | 1932 Los Angeles | Coxed four |
European Rowing Championships
| Silver medal – second place | 1933 Budapest | Coxed pair |

Jerzy Walerian Skolimowski (9 December 1907 – 12 February 1985) was a Polish rowing coxswain who competed in the 1928 Summer Olympics, in the 1932 Summer Olympics, and in the 1936 Summer Olympics.

He was born in Łuków and died in London, Great Britain. He is buried at the Powązki Cemetery in Warsaw.

In 1928 he was the coxswain of the Polish boat which finished fourth in the eight event after being eliminated in the quarter-finals. Four years later he won the silver medal as coxswain of the Polish boat in the coxed pair competition as well as the bronze medal as coxswain of the Polish boat in the coxed four competition. In 1936 he was the coxswain of the Polish boat which was eliminated in the repechage of the coxed pair event. He also competed as coxswain of the Polish boat in the coxed four event but they were also eliminated in the repechage.

Skolimowski was also a painter. His work was part of the painting event in the art competition at the 1932 Summer Olympics.

He fought in the September Campaign of World War II.
