= Rade Sunara =

Croatian rower

Personal information
- Nationality: Croatian
- Born: 10 February 1914; Šibenik, Kingdom of Dalmatia, Austria-Hungary
- Died: 26 December 1987 (aged 73); Šibenik, SR Croatia, SFR Yugoslavia

Sport
- Sport: Rowing

Rade Sunara (10 February 1914 – 26 December 1987) was a Croatian rower. He competed in two events at the 1936 Summer Olympics.
