= Ivar Tingdahl =

Swedish fencer

Personal information
- Born: 21 December 1893 Tanum, Sweden
- Died: 9 February 1962 (aged 68) Västra Götaland, Sweden

Sport
- Sport: Fencing

Ivar Tingdahl (21 December 1893 – 9 February 1962) was a Swedish male foil and sabre fencer. He competed at the 1928 and 1936 Summer Olympics.
