= Adamor Gonçalves =

Brazilian rower

Personal information
- Full name: Adamor Pinho Gonçalves
- Nationality: Brazilian
- Born: 11 March 1907

Sport
- Sport: Rowing

Adamor Pinho Gonçalves (born 11 March 1907, date of death unknown) was a Brazilian rower. He competed at the 1932 Summer Olympics and the 1936 Summer Olympics.
