= Stanisław Kuryłłowicz =

Polish rower (1909–1945)

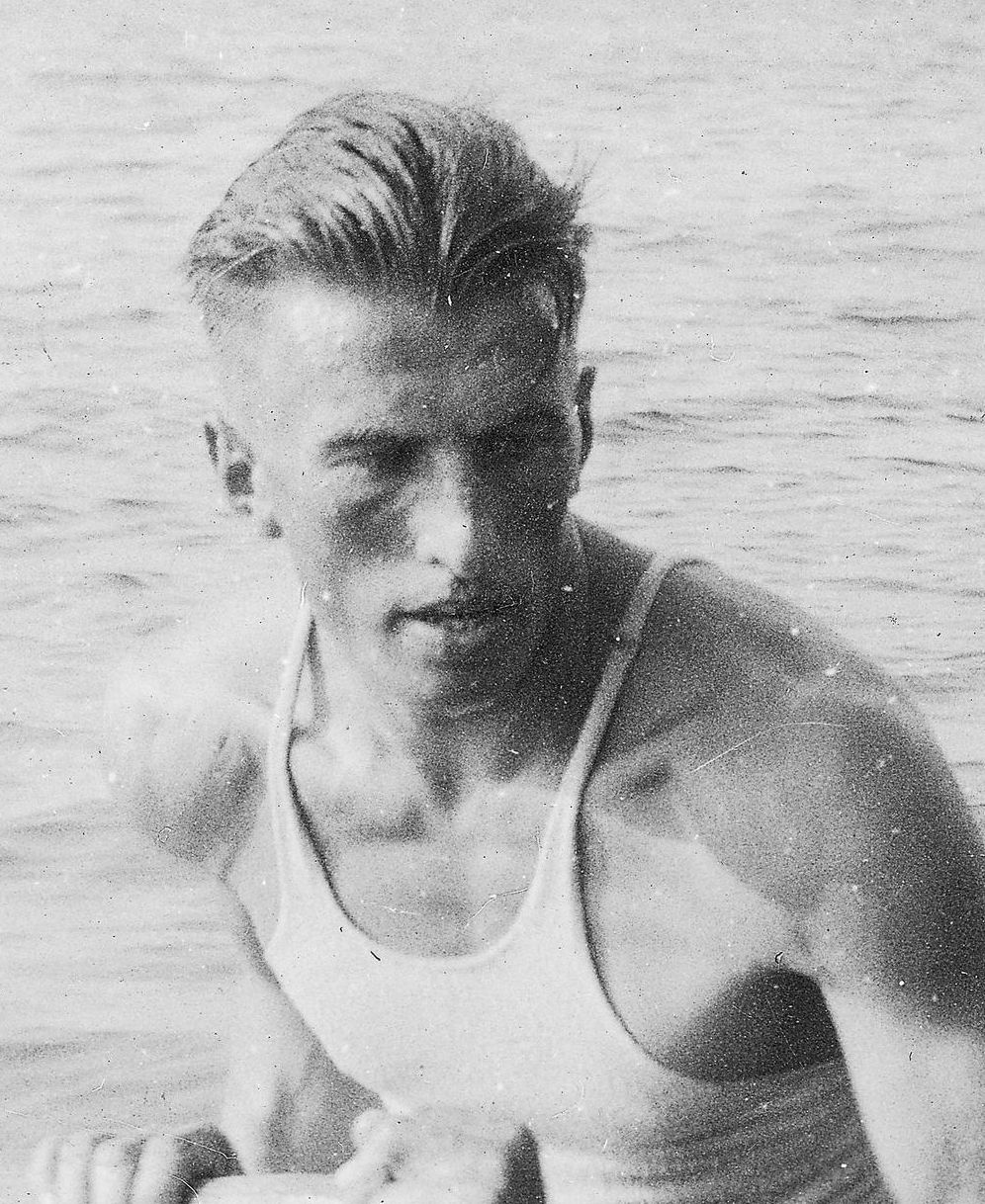
- Kuryłłowicz in 1934

Personal information
- Born: 6 June 1909 Grodno, Russian Empire
- Died: 2 February 1945 (aged 35) Poznań, Reichsgau Wartheland, Nazi Germany

Sport
- Sport: Rowing
Medal record
Men's rowing
Representing Poland
European Rowing Championships
Bronze medal – third place	1935 Berlin	Coxed pair
Bronze medal – third place	1937 Amsterdam	Coxed pair

Stanisław Kuryłłowicz (6 June 1909 – 2 February 1945) was a Polish rower. He competed at the 1936 Summer Olympics in Berlin with the men's coxed four where they were eliminated in the semi-final.

Kuryłłowicz enlisted to the Polish Army to fight the German invasion of Poland in 1939. He died on 2 February 1945 during the fights for the Poznań Citadel.
