= Antoni Franz =

Polish fencer

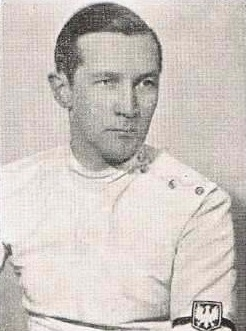

Personal information
- Born: 26 January 1905 Lemberg, Austria-Hungary
- Died: 16 July 1965 (aged 60) Gliwice, Poland

Sport
- Sport: Fencing

Antoni Franz (26 January 1905 – 16 July 1965) was a Polish fencer. He competed in the individual and team épée events at the 1936 Summer Olympics.
