= Herbert Buhtz =

German rower (1911–2006)

Personal information
- Born: 12 April 1911 Koblenz, German Empire
- Died: 7 June 2006 (aged 95) Berlin, Germany
- Occupation: dentist

Sport
- Sport: Rowing
Medal record
Men's rowing
Representing Nazi Germany
Olympic Games
Silver medal – second place	1932 Los Angeles	Double sculls
European Rowing Championships
Silver medal – second place	1937 Amsterdam	Eight
Gold medal – first place	1938 Milan	Eight

Herbert Buhtz (12 April 1911 – 7 June 2006) was a German rower who competed in the 1932 Summer Olympics.

Buhtz was born in Koblenz. He became a sculler with Berliner RC. In 1932 he won the Diamond Challenge Sculls at Henley Royal Regatta beating Gerhard Boetzelen in the final. Later in the year he partnered Boetzelen to win the silver medal in the double sculls competition rowing at the 1932 Summer Olympics. In 1934 he won the Diamond Challenge Sculls at Henley again.

Buhtz was a dentist. He died in Berlin at the age of 95.
