= Włodzimierz Zawadzki (rower) =

Polish rower

Personal information
- Nationality: Polish
- Born: 10 May 1911 Vilna, Russian Empire
- Died: 5 May 1996 (aged 84)

Sport
- Sport: Rowing

Włodzimierz Zawadzki (10 May 1911 – 5 May 1996) was a Polish rower. He competed in the men's coxed four at the 1936 Summer Olympics.
