= Helge Meuller =

Swedish sports shooter

Personal information
- Born: 15 March 1909 Malmköping, Sweden
- Died: 22 April 1988 (aged 79) Stockholm, Sweden

Sport
- Sport: Sports shooting

Helge Meuller (15 March 1909 – 22 April 1988) was a Swedish sports shooter. He competed in two events at the 1936 Summer Olympics.
