= René Cavalero =

French swimmer (1917–2008)

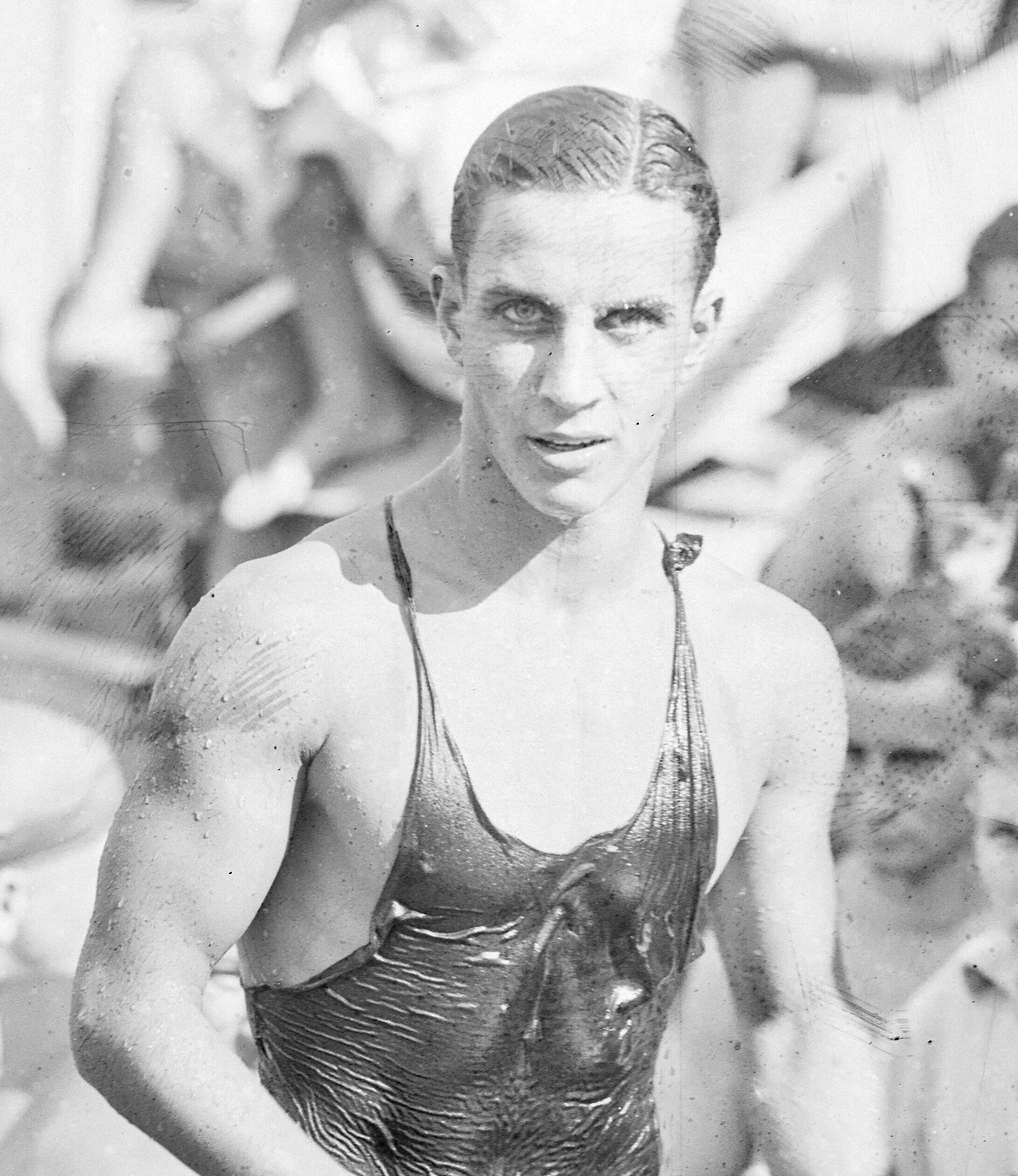
- René Cavalero in 1933

Personal information
- Born: 20 November 1917
- Died: 27 November 2008 (aged 91)

Sport
- Sport: Swimming
- Club: CN Paris
Medal record
Representing France
European Championships
Silver medal – second place	1938 London	4×200 m freestyle

René Cavalero (20 November 1917 – 27 November 2008) was a French swimmer who won a silver medal in the 4 × 200 m freestyle relay at the 1938 European Aquatics Championships.

== Career ==
He finished fourth in the same event at the 1936 Summer Olympics.

He also played water polo with the team Cercle des Nageurs de Marseille.

== Cavalero-Champion company ==
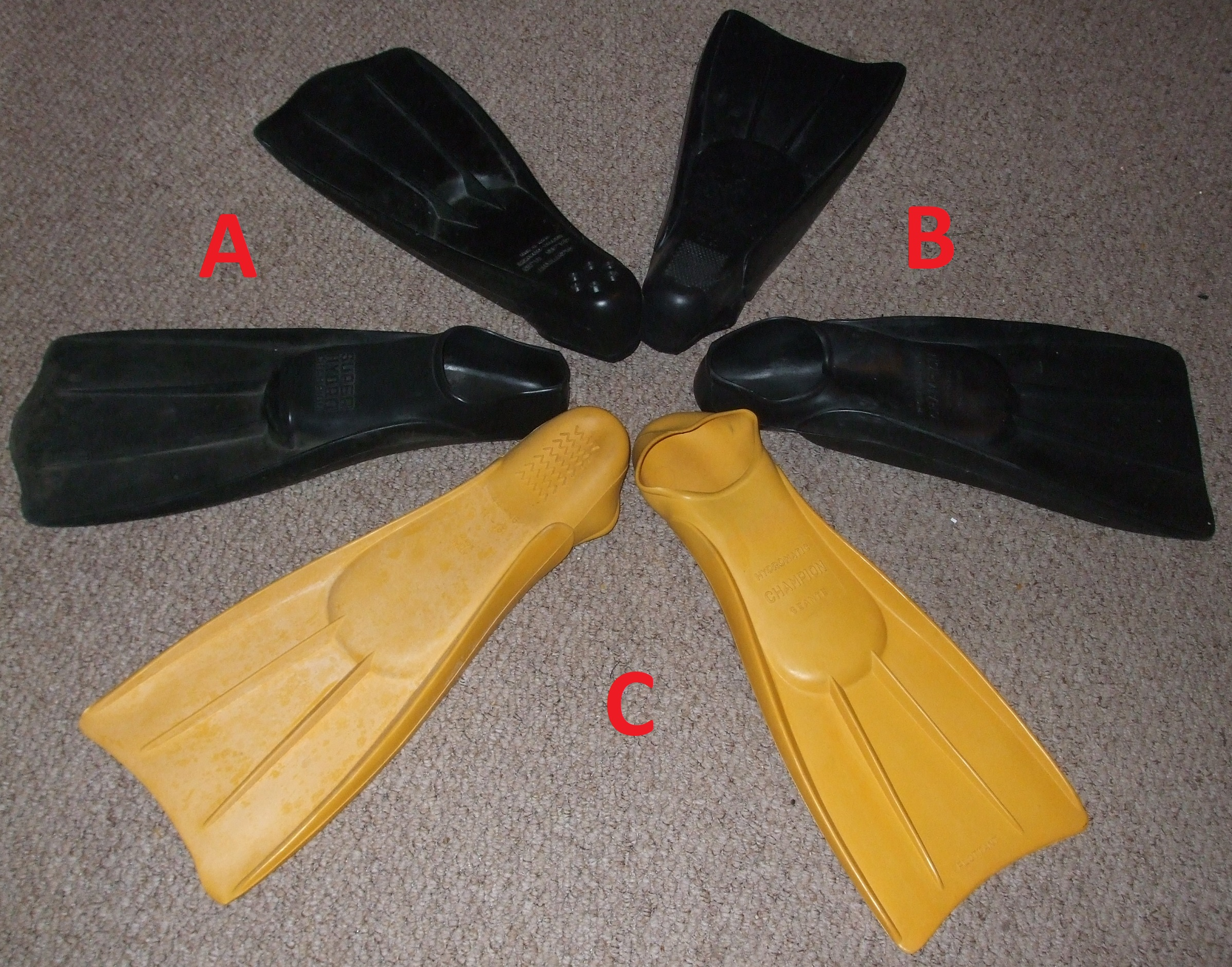
Mid-twentieth-century Cavalero-Champion closed-heel swimming fins

In 1941, he invented the underwater speargun Champion, which soon became popular and was produced by his company Cavalero; its U. S. Cavalero Corp. branch was registered in 1975 in California.

The image on the right illustrates three models of swimming fins manufactured by the company during the 1950s and the 1960s:

- A. Newer (1960s) black Cavalero-Champion Super Hydro swimming fins with closed heels and open toes.
- B. Older (1950s) black Cavalero-Champion Hydromatic swimming fins with closed heels and toes.
- C. Newer (1960s) yellow Cavalero-Champion Hydromatic swimming fins with closed heels and toes.

The company issued several product catalogues that can be accessed online.

After several decades of competition the company was absorbed by Beuchat in 1992.
