= Flemming Jensen (born 1914) =

Danish rower

Personal information
- Born: Claus Flemming Frederik Brandt Jensen; 19 September 1914 Copenhagen, Denmark
- Died: 30 November 1965 (aged 51) Copenhagen, Denmark

Sport
- Sport: Rowing
- Club: Københavns Roklub
Medal record
Men's rowing
Representing Denmark
European Rowing Championships
Bronze medal – third place	1937 Amsterdam	Eight

Claus Flemming Frederik Brandt Jensen (19 September 1914 – 30 November 1965) was a Danish rower.

Jensen was born in 1914 in Copenhagen. He competed at the 1936 Summer Olympics in Berlin with the men's coxed four and came sixth. He died in 1965.
