= Willy Collet =

Belgian rower

Personal information
- Nationality: Belgian
- Born: 10 April 1913; Hasselt, Belgium
- Died: 1974 (aged 60–61)

Sport
- Sport: Rowing
- Club: RNV, Bruxelles; RSNB, Bruxelles

Willy Alphonse Collet (10 April 1913 – 1974) was a Belgian rower. He competed at the 1936 Summer Olympics and the 1948 Summer Olympics.
