= Henri Dulieux =

French fencer (1897–1982)

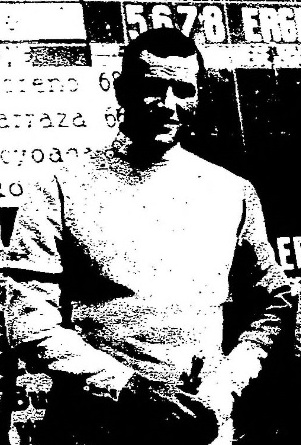
- Dulieux in 1936

Personal information
- Born: 10 May 1897 Lille, France
- Died: 29 May 1982 (aged 85)

Sport
- Sport: Fencing
Medal record
Men's fencing
Representing France
Olympic Games
Bronze medal – third place	1936 Berlin	Épée, team

Henri Dulieux (10 May 1897 – 29 May 1982) was a French fencer. He won a bronze medal in the team épée event at the 1936 Summer Olympics.
