= Thérèse Blondeau =

French swimmer (1913–2013)

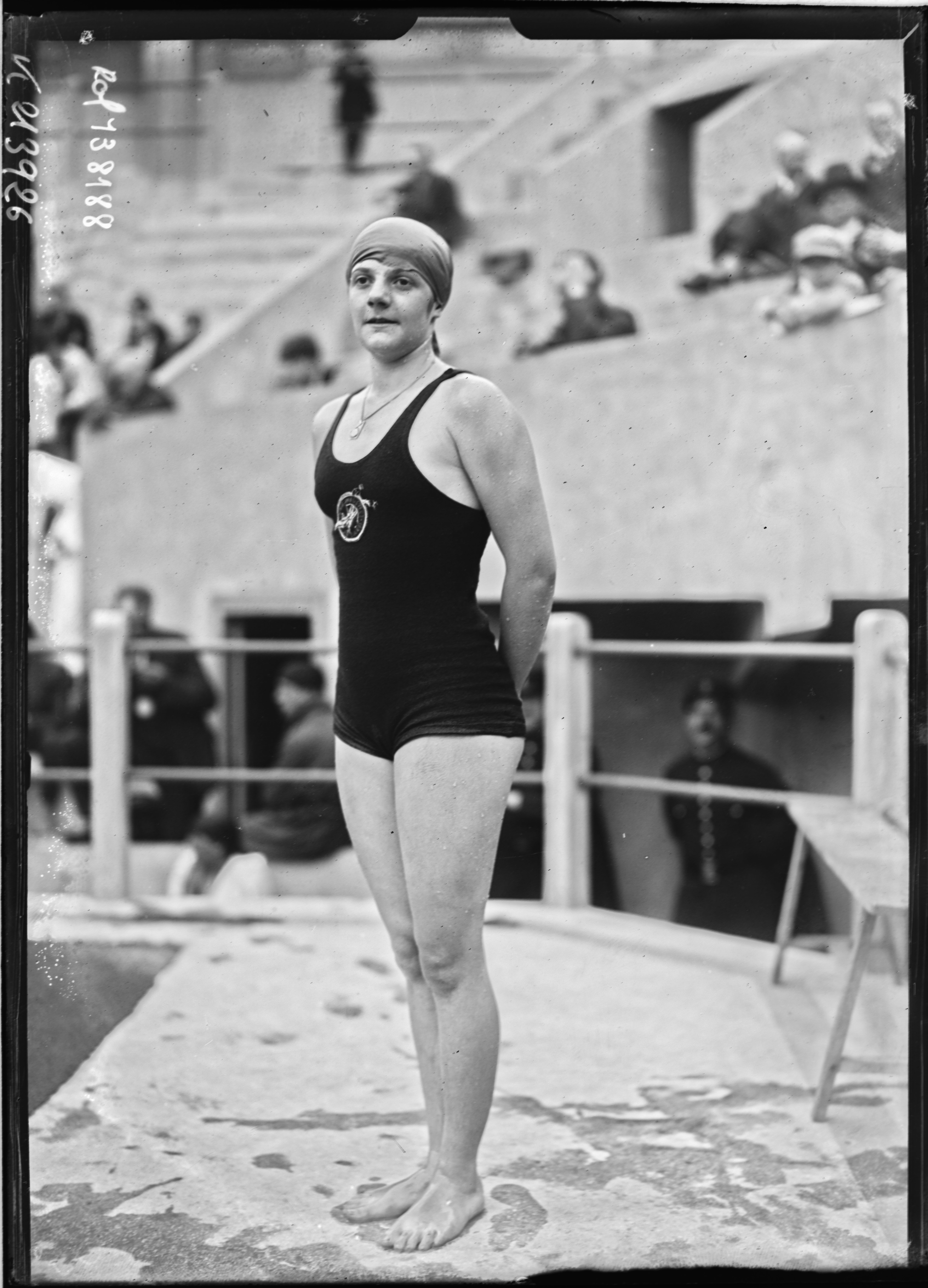
- Thérèse Blondeau in 1929 at Piscine des Tourelles

Personal information
- Born: December 4, 1913 Épinal, France
- Died: June 28, 2013 (aged 99)

Sport
- Sport: Swimming
- Strokes: Backstroke

Thérèse Blondeau (December 4, 1913 – June 28, 2013) was a French swimmer who competed at the 1936 Summer Olympics in Berlin. She failed to advance beyond the first round of the women's 100 metre backstroke event. She had swum previously at the 1934 European Aquatics Championships in Magdeburg, Germany and was one of the last two surviving French participants at the 1936 Summer Olympics, along with Noël Vandernotte. She was born in Épinal.
