= Christian Talli =

French swimmer

Personal information
- Born: 20 December 1917 Toulouse, France
- Died: 1 February 2005 (aged 87) Toulouse, France

Sport
- Sport: Swimming
- Club: TOEC, Toulouse
Medal record
Representing France
European Championships
Silver medal – second place	1938 London	4×200 m freestyle

Christian Talli (20 December 1917 – 1 February 2005) was a French swimmer who won a silver medal in the 4 × 200 m freestyle relay at the 1938 European Aquatics Championships. He finished fourth in the same event at the 1936 Summer Olympics. During his career he won five national freestyle titles.
