= Bronisław Karwecki =

Polish rower

Personal information
- Nationality: Polish
- Born: 13 May 1912; Pocewicze
- Died: 11 November 1998 (aged 86); Gdańsk, Poland

Sport
- Sport: Rowing

Bronisław Karwecki (13 May 1912 – 11 November 1998) was a Polish rower. He competed in the men's coxed four at the 1936 Summer Olympics.
