= Harry Sköld =

Swedish rower

Personal information
- Nationality: Swedish
- Born: 17 June 1910; Stockholm, Sweden
- Died: 23 January 1988 (aged 77); Stockholm, Sweden

Sport
- Sport: Rowing

Harry Sköld (17 June 1910 – 23 January 1988) was a Swedish rower. He competed in the men's coxed four at the 1936 Summer Olympics.
