= Ćiril Ban =

Croatian rower

Personal information
- Nationality: Croatian
- Born: 5 July 1910; Šibenik, Kingdom of Dalmatia, Austria-Hungary
- Died: 2 July 1987 (aged 76); Šibenik, SR Croatia, SFR Yugoslavia

Sport
- Sport: Rowing

Ćiril Ban (5 July 1910 – 2 July 1987) was a Croatian rower. He competed in two events at the 1936 Summer Olympics.
