= Witalis Leporowski =

Polish rower

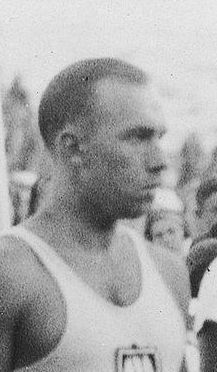
- Leporowski in 1935

Personal information
- Born: 4 April 1907 Poznań, Poland
- Died: 30 August 1978 (aged 71) Poznań, Poland
- Height: 178 cm (5 ft 10 in)
- Weight: 78 kg (172 lb)

Sport
- Sport: Rowing
Medal record
Men's rowing
Representing Poland
European Rowing Championships
Bronze medal – third place	1929 Bydgoszcz	Eight
Bronze medal – third place	1935 Berlin	Coxed pair

Witalis Leporowski (4 April 1907 – 30 August 1978) was a Polish rower. He competed at the 1936 Summer Olympics in Berlin with the men's coxed four where they were eliminated in the semi-final.
