= Carl Sjöblom =

Swedish rower

Personal information
- Nationality: Swedish
- Born: 2 July 1911; Stockholm, Sweden
- Died: 10 May 1977 (aged 65); Stockholm, Sweden

Sport
- Sport: Rowing

Carl Sjöblom (2 July 1911 – 10 May 1977) was a Swedish rower. He competed in the men's coxed four at the 1936 Summer Olympics.
