= Erik Johansson (rower) =

Swedish rower (1911–1961)

Personal information
- Nationality: Swedish
- Born: 30 October 1911 Stockholm, Sweden
- Died: 4 March 1961 (aged 49) Stockholm, Sweden

Sport
- Sport: Rowing

Erik Johansson (30 October 1911 – 4 March 1961) was a Swedish rower. He competed in the men's coxed four at the 1936 Summer Olympics.
