= Sven Tisell =

Swedish rowing cox

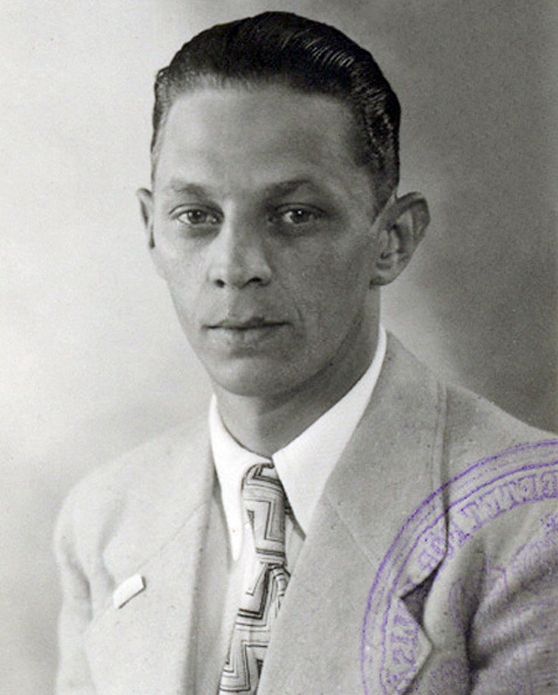

Personal information
- Born: 22 June 1909 Vaxholm, Sweden
- Died: 5 November 1972 (aged 63) Stockholm, Sweden

Sport
- Sport: Rowing
- Club: Vaxholms RF

Sven Folke Tisell (22 June 1909 – 5 November 1972) was a Swedish rowing coxswain. He competed in the coxed fours at the 1936 Summer Olympics, but failed to reach the final.
