= Stipe Krnčević =

Personal information
- Nationality: Croatian
- Born: 12 December 1910; Šibenik, Austria-Hungary
- Died: 8 October 1978 (aged 67); Šibenik, Yugoslavia

Sport
- Sport: Rowing

Stipe Krnčević (12 December 1910 – 8 October 1978) was a Croatian rower. He competed at the 1936 Summer Olympics and the 1948 Summer Olympics.
