= Noël Vandernotte =

French rower (1923–2020)

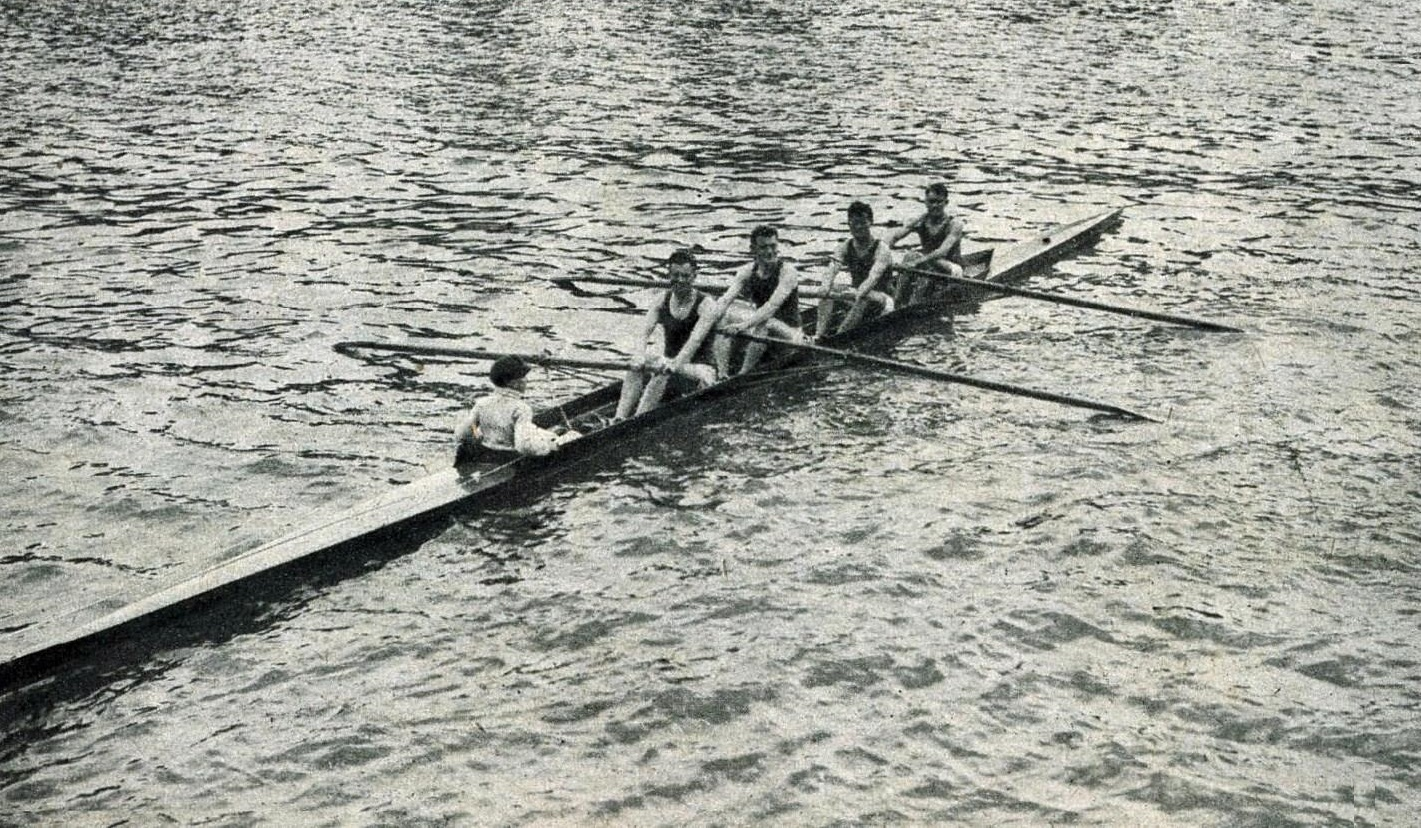
- Coxed four in July 1936 (from left): Noël Vandernotte (cox), Fernand and Marcel Vandernotte, Jean Cosmat, and Marcel Chauvigné

Personal information
- Born: 25 December 1923 Anglet, France
- Died: 18 June 2020 (aged 96) Beaucaire, France

Sport
- Sport: Rowing
- Club: CA Nantes
Medal record
Men's rowing
Representing FRA
Olympic Games
Bronze medal – third place	1936 Berlin	Coxed pair
Bronze medal – third place	1936 Berlin	Coxed four
European Rowing Championships
Silver medal – second place	1934 Lucerne	Coxed four
- Updated on 20 May 2018

Noël Vandernotte (25 December 1923 – 18 June 2020) was a French rowing coxswain who competed in the 1936 Summer Olympics. He was the son of Fernand Vandernotte and the nephew of Marcel Vandernotte. In 1936 he won the bronze medal of the French boat in the coxed pairs event as well as in the coxed four competition. He was the youngest male medalist at the 1936 Games, at 12 years and 233 days, and is also the youngest French Olympic medalist of all-time.
