= Vice Jurišić =

Croatian rower (1909–1993)

Personal information
- Nationality: Croatian
- Born: 23 March 1909 Šibenik, Austria-Hungary
- Died: 6 August 1993 (aged 84) Šibenik, Croatia

Sport
- Sport: Rowing

Vice Jurišić (23 March 1909 – 6 August 1993) was a Croatian rower. He competed in two events at the 1936 Summer Olympics.
