= Marcel Chauvigné =

French rower (1911–1972)

Personal information
- Born: 25 September 1911 Nantes, France
- Died: 2 July 1972 (aged 60) Nantes, France

Sport
- Sport: Rowing
- Club: CA Nantes
Medal record
Men's rowing
Representing FRA
Olympic Games
Bronze medal – third place	1936 Berlin	Coxed four
European Rowing Championships
Silver medal – second place	1934 Lucerne	Coxed four

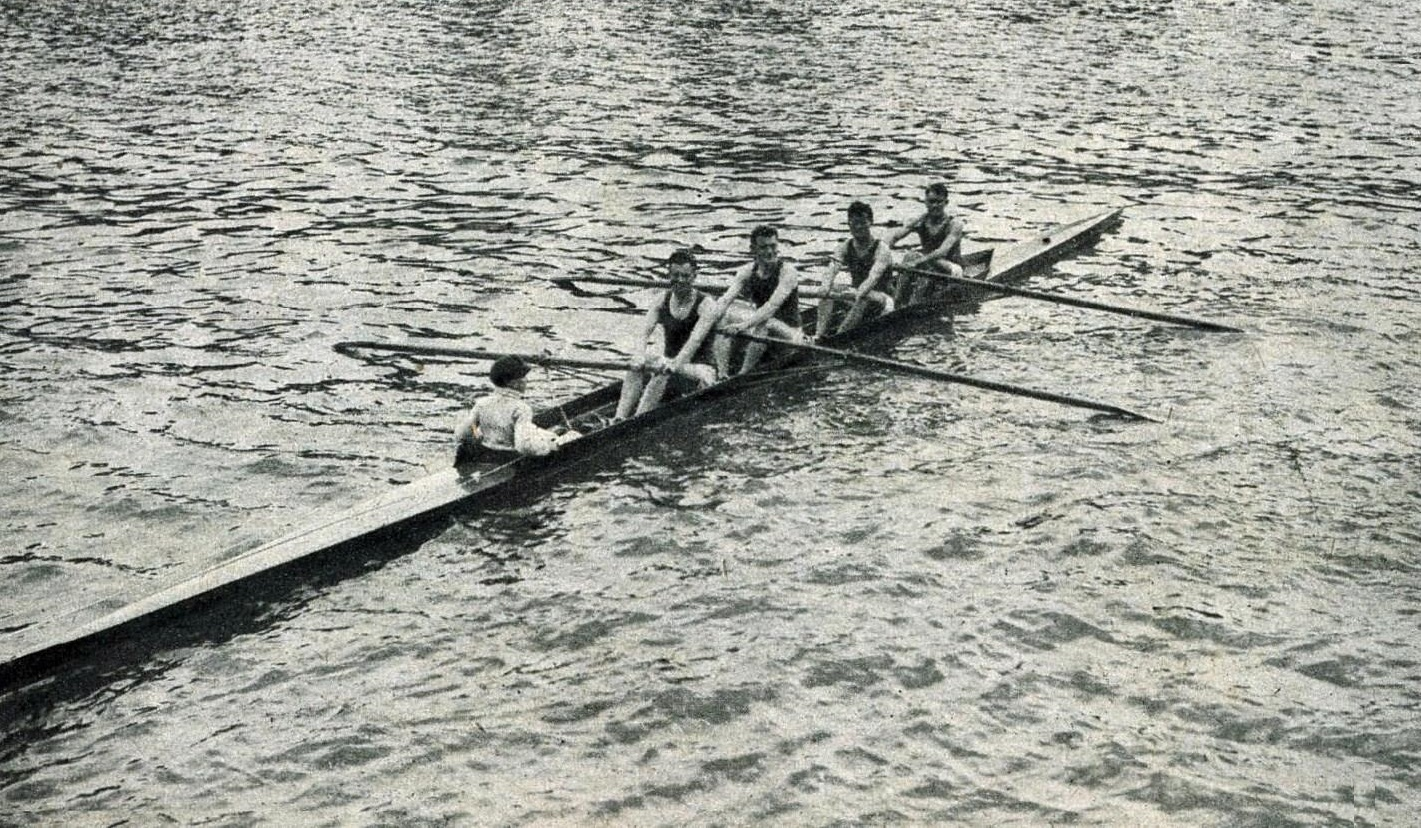
The Four with the helmsman of the Nantes Board of Directors in July 1936, from G. to D. Noël, Fernand and Marcel Vandernotte, then Cosmat and Chauvigné.

Marcel Chauvigné (25 September 1911 – 2 July 1972) was a French rower who competed in the 1936 Summer Olympics.

In 1936 he won the bronze medal as a crew member of the French boat in the coxed four competition.
