= Fernand Vandernotte =

French rower (1902–1990)

Personal information
- Born: Fernand Auguste Henri Marius Vandernotte; 12 July 1902 Tillières, France
- Died: 20 January 1990 (aged 87) Saint-Nazaire, France

Sport
- Sport: Rowing
- Club: CA Nantes
Medal record
Men's rowing
Representing FRA
Olympic Games
| Bronze medal – third place | 1936 Berlin | Coxed four |
European Rowing Championships
| Bronze medal – third place | 1930 Liège | Coxless pair |
| Bronze medal – third place | 1933 Budapest | Coxed pair |
| Silver medal – second place | 1934 Lucerne | Coxed four |

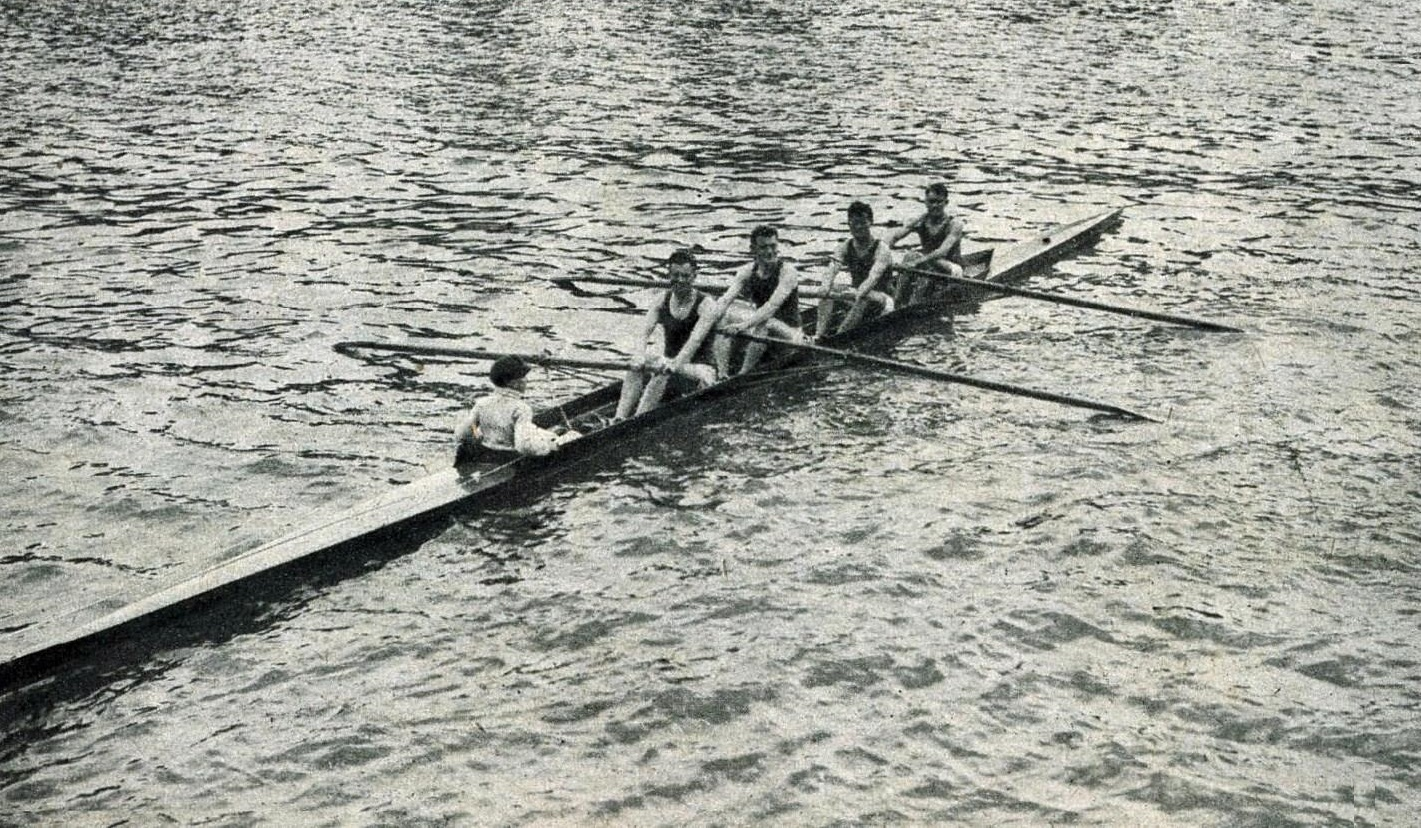
The Four with coxswain of the CA of Nantes in July 1936, from L. to R. Noël, Fernand and Marcel Vandernotte, then Cosmat and Chauvigné.jpg

Fernand Auguste Henri Marius Vandernotte (12 July 1902 – 20 January 1990) was a French rower who competed in the 1932 Summer Olympics and in the 1936 Summer Olympics.

He was born in Tillières. He was the elder brother of Marcel Vandernotte and the father of Noël Vandernotte. In 1932, he was eliminated with his brother Marcel in the repechage of the coxed pair event. Four years later he won the bronze medal as a crew member of the French boat in the coxed four competition.
