= Marcel Vandernotte =

French rower (1909–1993)

Personal information
- Born: Marcel Henri Vandernotte; 29 July 1909 Nantes, France
- Died: 15 December 1993 (aged 84) Nantes, France

Sport
- Sport: Rowing
- Club: CA Nantes
Medal record
Men's rowing
Representing FRA
Olympic Games
Bronze medal – third place	1936 Berlin	Coxed four
European Rowing Championships
Bronze medal – third place	1933 Budapest	Coxed pair
Silver medal – second place	1934 Lucerne	Coxed four

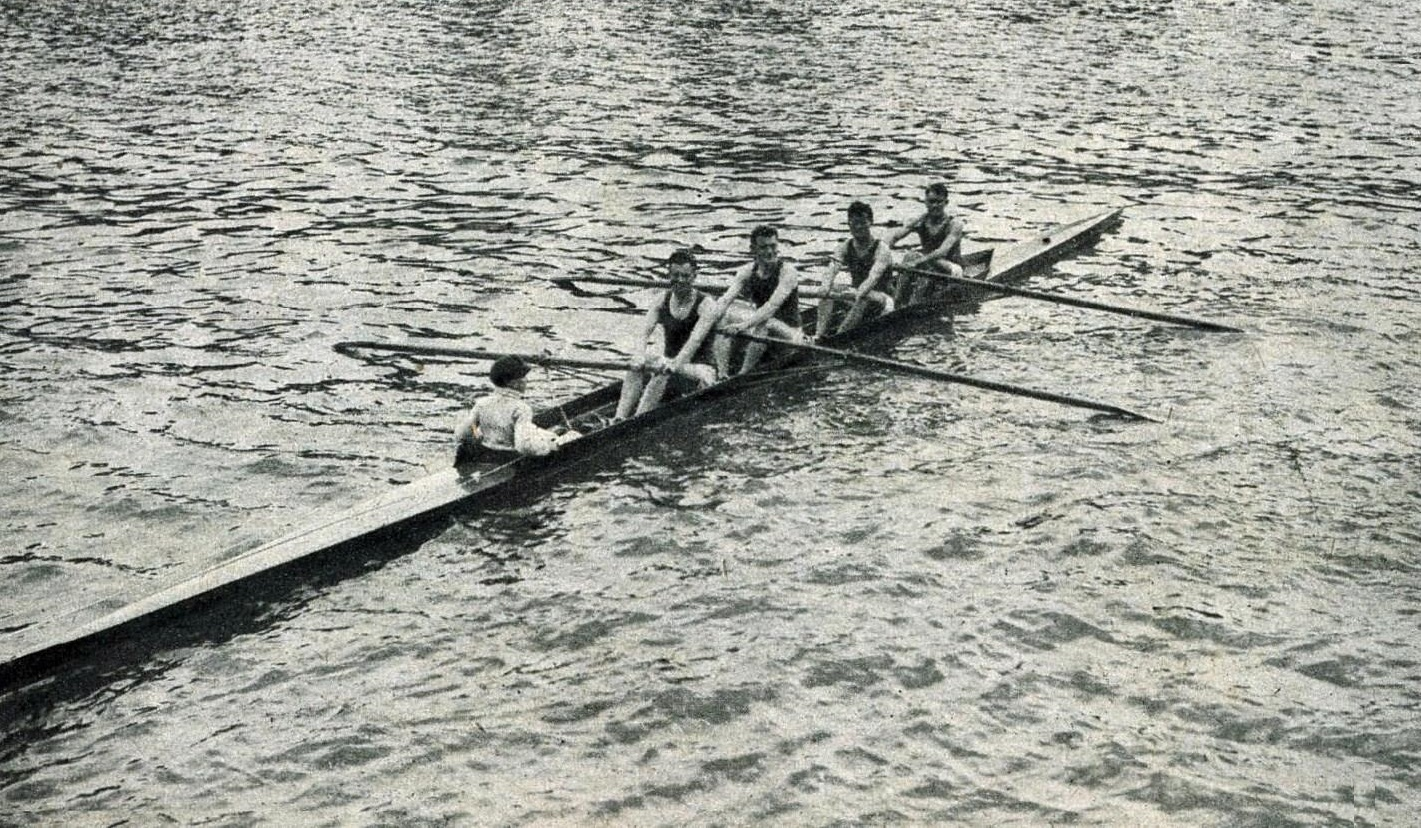
The Four with coxswain of the CA of Nantes in July 1936, from L. to R. Noël, Fernand and Marcel Vandernotte, then Cosmat and Chauvigné.jpg

Marcel Henri Vandernotte (29 July 1909 – 15 December 1993) was a French rower who competed in the 1932 Summer Olympics and in the 1936 Summer Olympics.

He was born in Nantes. He was the younger brother of Fernand Vandernotte and the uncle of Noël Vandernotte. In 1932 he was eliminated with his brother Fernand in the repechage of the coxed pair event. Four years later he won the bronze medal as crew member of the French boat in the coxed four competition.
