= Spain at the 1932 Summer Olympics =

- IOC code: ESP
- NOC: Spanish Olympic Committee

in Los Angeles
- Competitors: 7 men in 3 sports
- Flag bearer: Julio Castro
- Medals Ranked 26th: Gold 0 Silver 0 Bronze 1 Total 1

Summer Olympics appearances (overview)
- 1900; 1904–1912; 1920; 1924; 1928; 1932; 1936; 1948; 1952; 1956; 1960; 1964; 1968; 1972; 1976; 1980; 1984; 1988; 1992; 1996; 2000; 2004; 2008; 2012; 2016; 2020; 2024

Spain competed at the 1932 Summer Olympics in Los Angeles, United States. Seven competitors, all men, took part in four events in three sports.

== Medalists ==
=== Bronze ===
- Santiago Amat – Sailing, Men's Monotype Class

== Shooting ==
Five shooters represented Spain in 1932.

Men

Athlete	Event	Final	
Athlete	Event	Points	Rank
Buenaventura Bagaria	50 m rifle prone	274	25
Luis Calvet	25 m rapid fire pistol	17	13
Julio Castro	50 m rifle prone	291	9
Manuel Corrales	50 m rifle prone	268	26
Manuel Corrales	25 m rapid fire pistol	17	13
José González	25 m rapid fire pistol	35	4
