= Julio Castro =

Julio Castro may refer to:

- Julio Castro (sport shooter) (1879–?), Spanish sports shooter
- Julio César Castro (1928–2003), Uruguayan comedian, actor and dramatist
- Julio Castro Méndez, Venezuelan doctor

== See also ==
- Julian Castro (born 1974), American politician
