= Portolá Trail Campsite 2 =

California Historic Landmark

Portolá Trail Campsite No. 2
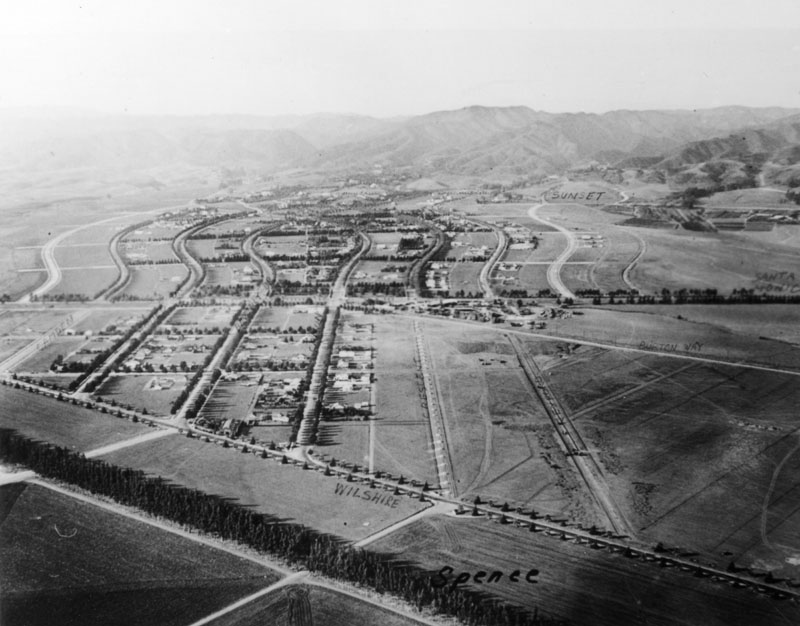
- Beverly Hills in 1919

- Location within the Los Angeles metropolitan area
- 34°03′44″N 118°22′35″W
- Location: La Cienega Park in Beverly Hills

History
- Built: 1769

California Historical Landmark
- Designated: Nov. 5, 1958
- Reference no.: 665

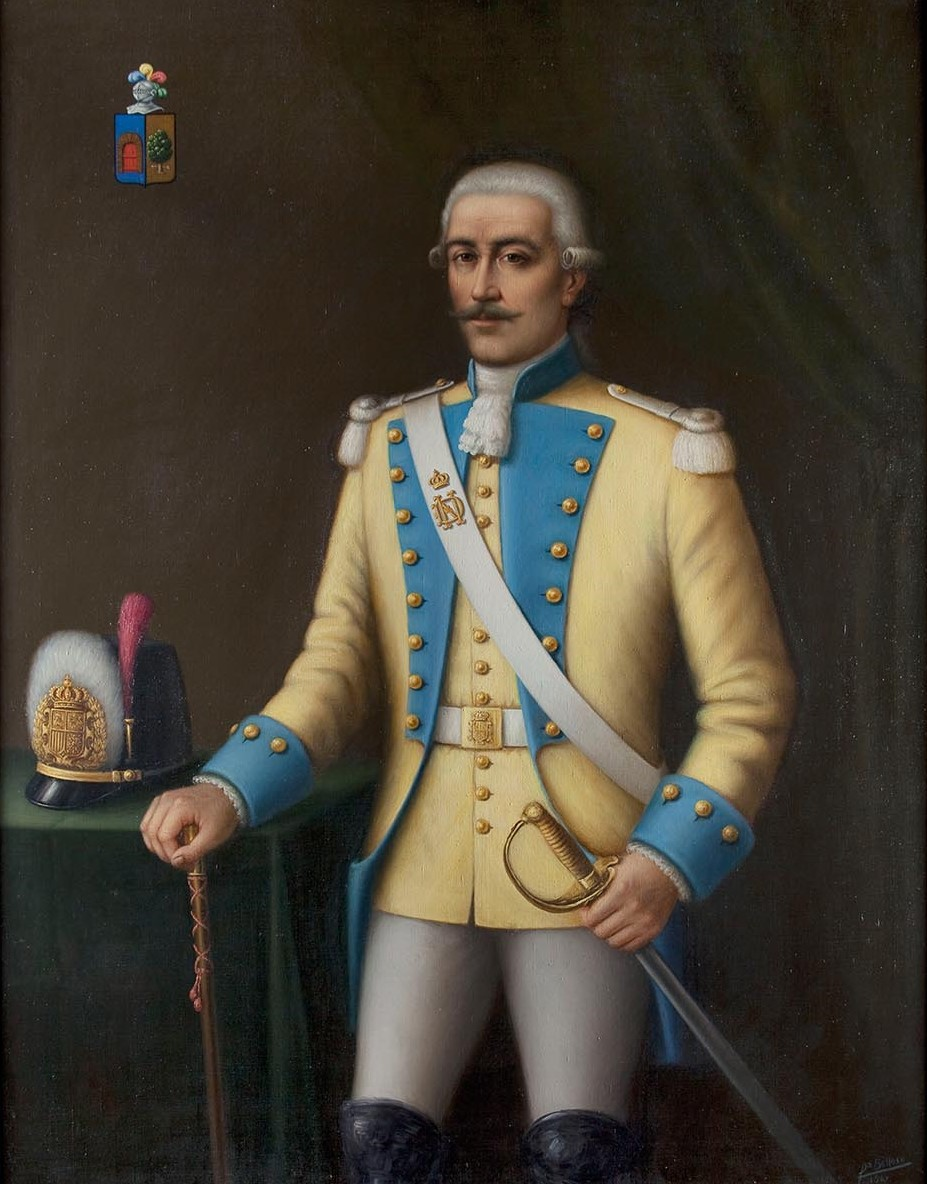
Gaspar de Portolá

The Portolá Trail Campsite 2 or Portolá Trail Campsite No. 2 is the spot of the first Europeans to travel and camp overnight in what is now Beverly Hills, California. The Portolá expedition camped at the site on August 3, 1769. The Portolá Trail Campsite No. 2 was designated a California Historic Landmark (No.665) on Nov. 5, 1958. The Portolá Trail Campsite is located in what is now 325 South La Cienega Boulevard between Olympic Boulevard and Gregory, in Beverly Hills. in Los Angeles County. Military officer Gaspar de Portolá was the commander of the expedition for the Spanish Empire with the goal of the Spanish colonization of the Americas. The expedition led to the founding of the first mission in the Los Angeles Basin, the Mission Vieja, on September 8, 1771, and of Alta California. The expedition arrived at Portolá Trail Campsite No. 2 from the Portolá Trail Campsite No. 1 in what is now Elysian Park. They came to camp site 1 from the San Gabriel Valley, were the Mission San Gabriel would be built later in 1776. As they depart Portolá Trail Campsite No. 2 they traveled west towards Santa Monica Bay. At San Monica Bay the expedition turned and traveled north to were the future Mission San Fernando would be built in 1797. Form San Fernando the expedition turned west to Ventura, the site of the future Mission San Buenaventura built in 1782.

Listed on the state historic mark #665 at the site:

- Don Gaspar de Portolá (1723–1786) – Expedition Leader would become the first Governor of the Californias.
- Captain Don Fernando Rivera y Moncada (1725–1781) – soldier and became the third Governor of The Californias.
- Lieutenant Don Pedro Fages (1734–1794) – soldier, became Lieutenant Governor under Gaspar de Portolá.
- Sgt. José Francisco Ortega (1734–1798) – soldier and early settler of Alta California. Future leader of the Presidio of San Diego.
- Father Juan Crespí (1721–1782) – recorded the complete expedition. Founder of first mission in area.
- Father Francisco Gómez – served as chaplain for the expedition, a Father from Mission San Diego, later moved to Mission Carmel.

== Marker ==
Marker on the site reads:

- NO. 665 PORTOLÁ TRAIL CAMPSITE, 2 – The expedition of Don Gaspar de Portolá from Mexico passed this way en route to Monterey to begin the Spanish colonization of California. With Captain Don Fernando Rivera y Moncada, Lieutenant Don Pedro Fages, Sergeant José Francisco Ortega, and Fathers Juan Crespí and Francisco Gómez, Portolá and his party camped near this spot on August 3, 1769.

== See also ==
- California Historical Landmarks in Los Angeles County
- Spanish missions in California
- List of California Ranchos
- Ranchos of Los Angeles County, California
