= Shooting at the 1932 Summer Olympics – Men's 25 metre rapid fire pistol =

Olympic shooting event

Men's 25 metre rapid fire pistol at the Games of the X Olympiad
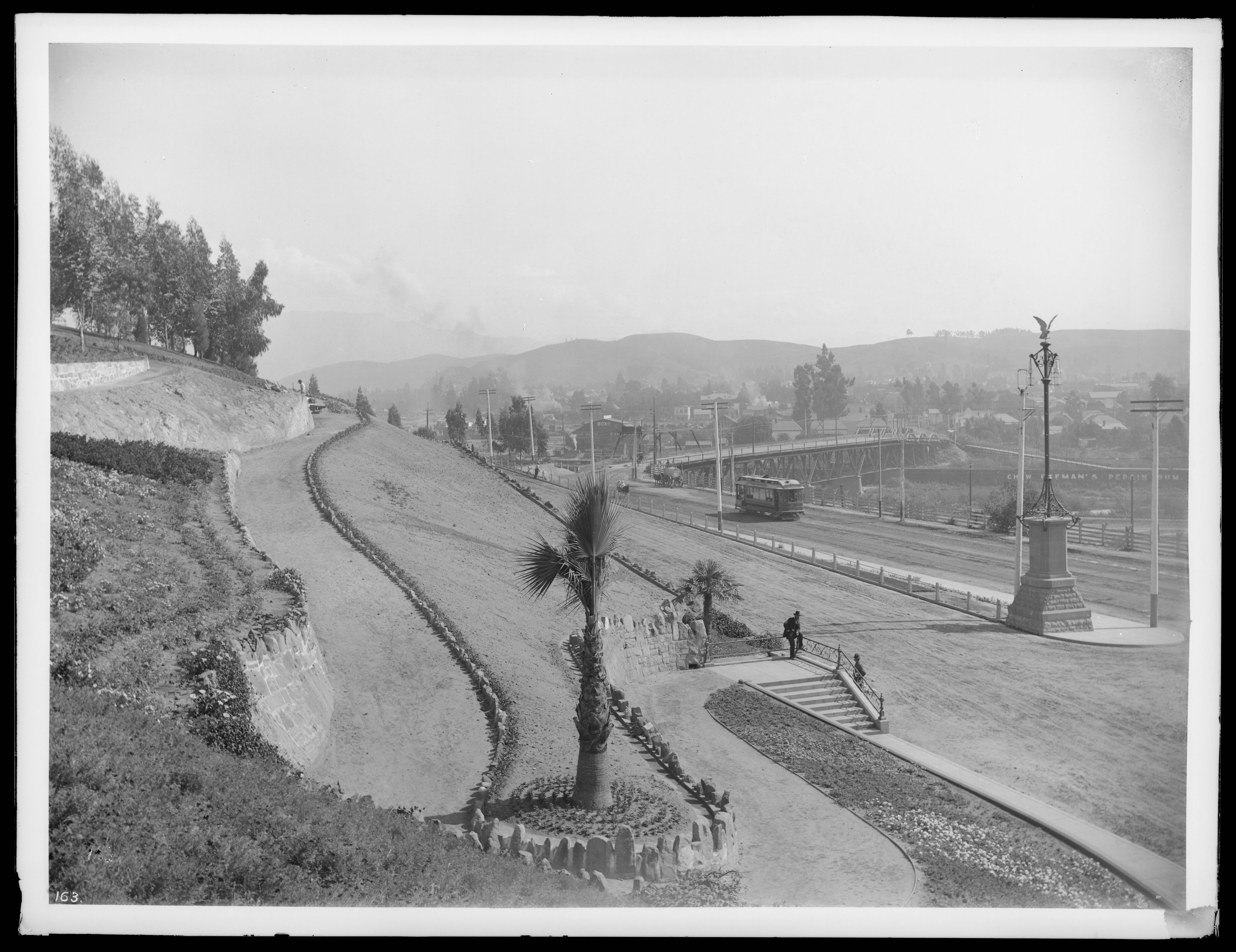
- Elysian Park entrance (1900)
- Venue: Elysian Park, Los Angeles, California
- Date: August 12
- Competitors: 18 from 7 nations
- Winning time: 42

Medalists
1st place, gold medalist(s)		Renzo Morigi; Italy
2nd place, silver medalist(s)		Heinrich Hax; Germany
3rd place, bronze medalist(s)		Domenico Matteucci; Italy

The men's ISSF 25 meter rapid fire pistol was a shooting sports event held as part of the Shooting at the 1932 Summer Olympics programme. It was the sixth appearance of the event. The competition was held on August 12, 1932. 18 shooters from 7 nations competed. Nations were limited to three shooters each. The event was won by Renzo Morigi of Italy, with Heinrich Hax of Germany taking silver and another Italian, Domenico Matteucci, earning bronze. They were the first medals in the event for both nations.

== Background ==
This was the sixth appearance of what would become standardised as the men's ISSF 25 meter rapid fire pistol event, the only event on the 2020 programme that traces back to 1896. The event has been held at every Summer Olympics except 1904 and 1928 (when no shooting events were held) and 1908; it was nominally open to women from 1968 to 1980, although very few women participated these years. The first five events were quite different, with some level of consistency finally beginning with the 1932 event—which, though it had differences from the 1924 competition, was roughly similar.

Spain made its debut in the event. The United States made its fourth appearance in the event, most of any nation.

== Competition format ==
As in 1924, the first round consisted of 18 shots in 3 series of 6 shots each. For each series, there were six separate standing silhouette targets that appeared for 8 seconds (down from 10 in 1924); the score for the string was how many targets were hit (there were no scoring rings). Maximum score was thus 18, 1 per shot.

The next four rounds were similar to the 1924 tie-breakers, with each round consisting of a single series of 6 shots. However, unlike in 1924 when the time limit was static at 8 seconds per series for the tie-breakers, the time kept shortening: 6 seconds for the second round, 4 for the third, 3 for the fourth, and 2 for the fifth. Shooters needed to achieve a perfect score in each round to advance to the next.

Ties within a round were not broken.

== Schedule ==
Date	Time	Round
Friday, 12 August 1932	9:00	Final

== Results ==
After the first round all competitors were eliminated which were not able to hit all 18 targets; six men were thus eliminated. Only one competitor was eliminated after the second round, because he was not able to achieve all six hits. Five marksmen were eliminated after round three and three were eliminated after the fourth round.

Renzo Morigi won the contest without missing any target.

Rank	Shooter	Nation	Round 1	Round 2	Round 3	Round 4	Round 5	Total
1st place, gold medalist(s)	Renzo Morigi	Italy	18	6	6	6	6	42
2nd place, silver medalist(s)	Heinrich Hax	Germany	18	6	6	6	4	40
3rd place, bronze medalist(s)	Domenico Matteucci	Italy	18	6	6	6	3	39
4	Walter Boninsegni	Italy	18	6	6	5	—	35
4	José González	Spain	18	6	6	5	—	35
4	Arturo Villanueva	Mexico	18	6	6	5	—	29
7	José Maria Ferreira	Portugal	18	6	5	—	—	29
7	Arnulfo Hernández	Mexico	18	6	5	—	—	29
7	Rafael Afonso de Sousa	Portugal	18	6	5	—	—	29
7	Luther Roberts	United States	18	6	5	—	—	29
7	Gustavo Salinas	Mexico	18	6	5	—	—	28
12	Thomas Carr	United States	18	5	—	—	—	23
13	Manuel Corrales	Spain	17	—	—	—	—	17
13	Luis Calvet	Spain	17	—	—	—	—	17
13	Eugenio do Amaral	Brazil	17	—	—	—	—	17
16	Ernest Tippin	United States	16	—	—	—	—	16
17	Bráz Magaldi	Brazil	15	—	—	—	—	15
17	Antônio da Silveira	Brazil	15	—	—	—	—	15
