= Shooting at the 1932 Summer Olympics =

Shooting at the Games of the X Olympiad
- Pictogram for Shooting

When shooting was reintroduced at the 1932 Summer Olympics in Los Angeles after being absent at the previous Games, it consisted of two events, one rifle event and one pistol event. The competitions were held on August 12, 1932 and August 13, 1932.

== Medal summary ==
Event	Gold	Silver	Bronze
rapid fire pistol	Renzo Morigi; Italy	Heinz Hax; Germany	Domenico Matteucci; Italy
rifle prone	Bertil Rönnmark; Sweden	Gustavo Huet; Mexico	Zoltán Soós-Ruszka Hradetzky; Hungary

== Participating nations ==
A total of 41 shooters from 10 nations competed at the Los Angeles Games:

- Argentina (2)
- Brazil (6)
- Germany (1)
- Hungary (3)
- Italy (6)
- Mexico (5)
- Portugal (4)
- Spain (5)
- Sweden (3)
- United States (6)

== Medal table ==
Rank	Nation	Gold	Silver	Bronze	Total
1	Italy	1	0	1	2
2	Sweden	1	0	0	1
3	Germany	0	1	0	1
3	Mexico	0	1	0	1
5	Hungary	0	0	1	1
Totals (5 entries)		2	2	2	6
