= Shooting at the 1932 Summer Olympics – Men's 50 metre rifle prone =

Men's 50 metre rifle, prone at the Games of the X Olympiad
- Venue: Elysian Park, Los Angeles, California
- Date: August 13
- Competitors: 26 from 9 nations

Medalists
| 1st place, gold medalist(s) | | Bertil Rönnmark | Sweden |
| 2nd place, silver medalist(s) | | Gustavo Huet | Mexico |
| 3rd place, bronze medalist(s) | | Zoltán Soós-Ruszka Hradetzky | Hungary |

The men's 50 metre rifle prone was a shooting sports event held as part of the Shooting at the 1932 Summer Olympics programme. It was the fourth appearance of the event. The competition was held on August 13, 1932. 26 shooters from 9 nations competed.

== Medalists ==
| Gold | Silver | Bronze |
|---|---|---|
| Bertil Rönnmark (SWE) | Gustavo Huet (MEX) | Zoltán Soós-Ruszka Hradetzky (HUN) |

== Records ==
These were the standing world and Olympic records prior to the 1932 Summer Olympics.

| World record | - | none | - | - |
| Olympic record | 398(*) | (France) Pierre Coquelin de Lisle | Paris (FRA) | June 23, 1924 |

There was no official world record registered.

(*) 400 rings possible

== Results ==
A maximum of three competitors per nation were allowed.

The competition was held over 15 series of two shots, so every shooter had 30 shots. The maximum score was 300. The shot-off was again a compete series. No ties were shot-off after the first three places.

Antal Barát-Lemberkovits missed one shot when he fired on the target of Gustavo Huet. This ten rings would have given him the gold medal.

After the original competition Bertil Rönnmark gave the rest of his rounds of ammunition to other marksmen not thinking about the possibility of a shoot-off. So he had to borrow the rounds for the final shoot-off to win the gold medal.

Zoltán Soós-Ruszka Hradetzky set the best performance in the bronze medal shoot-off with 296 points, but, according to the IOC's report, the Olympic record was credited to Bertil Rönnmark and Gustavo Huet for their 294 points in the final.

| Place | Shooter | Total | Shoot off |
|---|---|---|---|
| 1 | Bertil Rönnmark (SWE) | 294 | 294 |
| 2 | Gustavo Huet (MEX) | 294 | 290 |
| 3 | Zoltán Soós-Ruszka Hradetzky (HUN) | 293 | 296 |
| 4 | Mario Zorzi (ITA) | 293 | 293 |
| 5 | Gustaf Andersson (SWE) | 292 | |
| 5 | William Harding (USA) | 292 | |
| 5 | Francisco António Real (POR) | 292 | |
| 5 | Karl August Larsson (SWE) | 292 | |
| 9 | Julio Castro (ESP) | 291 | |
| 10 | Carlos Guerrero (MEX) | 290 | |
| 11 | Tibor Tary (HUN) | 289 | |
| 11 | Gustavo Salinas (MEX) | 289 | |
| 13 | Ugo Cantelli (ITA) | 288 | |
| 13 | Edward Shumaker (USA) | 288 | |
| 15 | Rom Stanifer (USA) | 287 | |
| 16 | Antonio Daneri (ARG) | 286 | |
| 16 | Amedeo Bruni (ITA) | 286 | |
| 18 | Antal Barát-Lemberkovits (HUN) | 285 | |
| 19 | Manoel Braga (BRA) | 284 | |
| 20 | Manuel Guerra (POR) | 282 | |
| 20 | Antônio Guimarães (BRA) | 282 | |
| 22 | Sigfrido Vogel (ARG) | 281 | |
| 23 | José Maria Ferreira (POR) | 279 | |
| 24 | José Castro (BRA) | 277 | |
| 25 | Buenaventura Bagaria (ESP) | 274 | |
| 26 | Manuel Corrales (ESP) | 268 | |
