= Sigfrido =

Sigfrido is a male given name, derived from the German given name Siegfried.

Notable people with this name include:

- Sigfrido Burmann, Spanish art director
- Sigfrido Ranucci, Italian journalist
- Sigfrido Reyes Morales, Salvadoran politician
- Sigfrido Tiñga, Filipino politician
- Sigfrido Vogel, Argentine

== See also ==
- Sigfrido (film) or The Dragon's Blood, an Italian epic adventure film
