= Portolá Trail Campsites =

California Historic Landmark

Portolá Trail Campsite No. 1
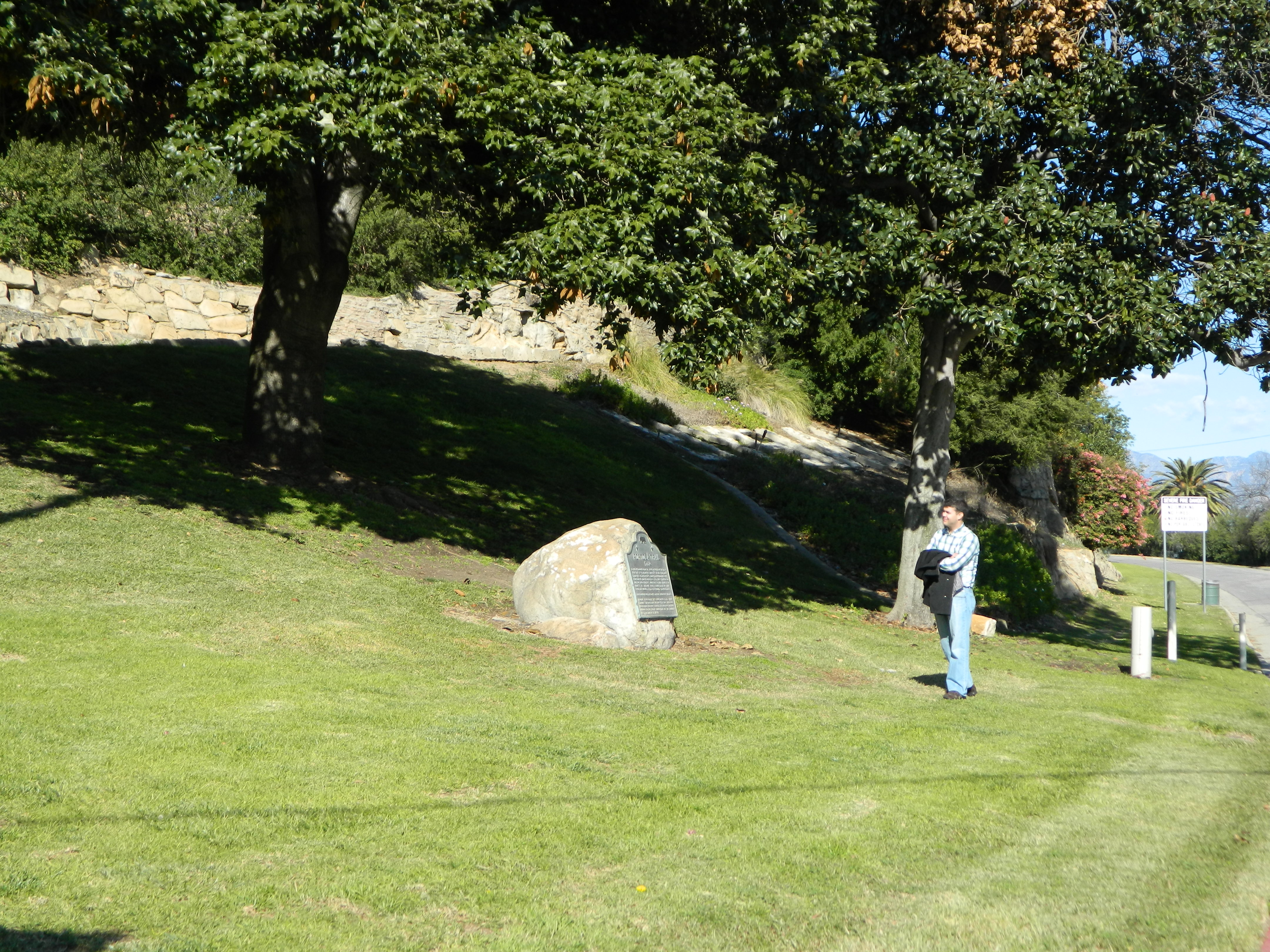
- Portolá Trail Campsite No. 1

- Location within the Los Angeles metropolitan area
- 34°04′19″N 118°13′38″W
- Location: Elysian Park, Los Angeles

History
- Built: 1769

California Historical Landmark
- Designated: Sept. 26, 1958
- Reference no.: 655

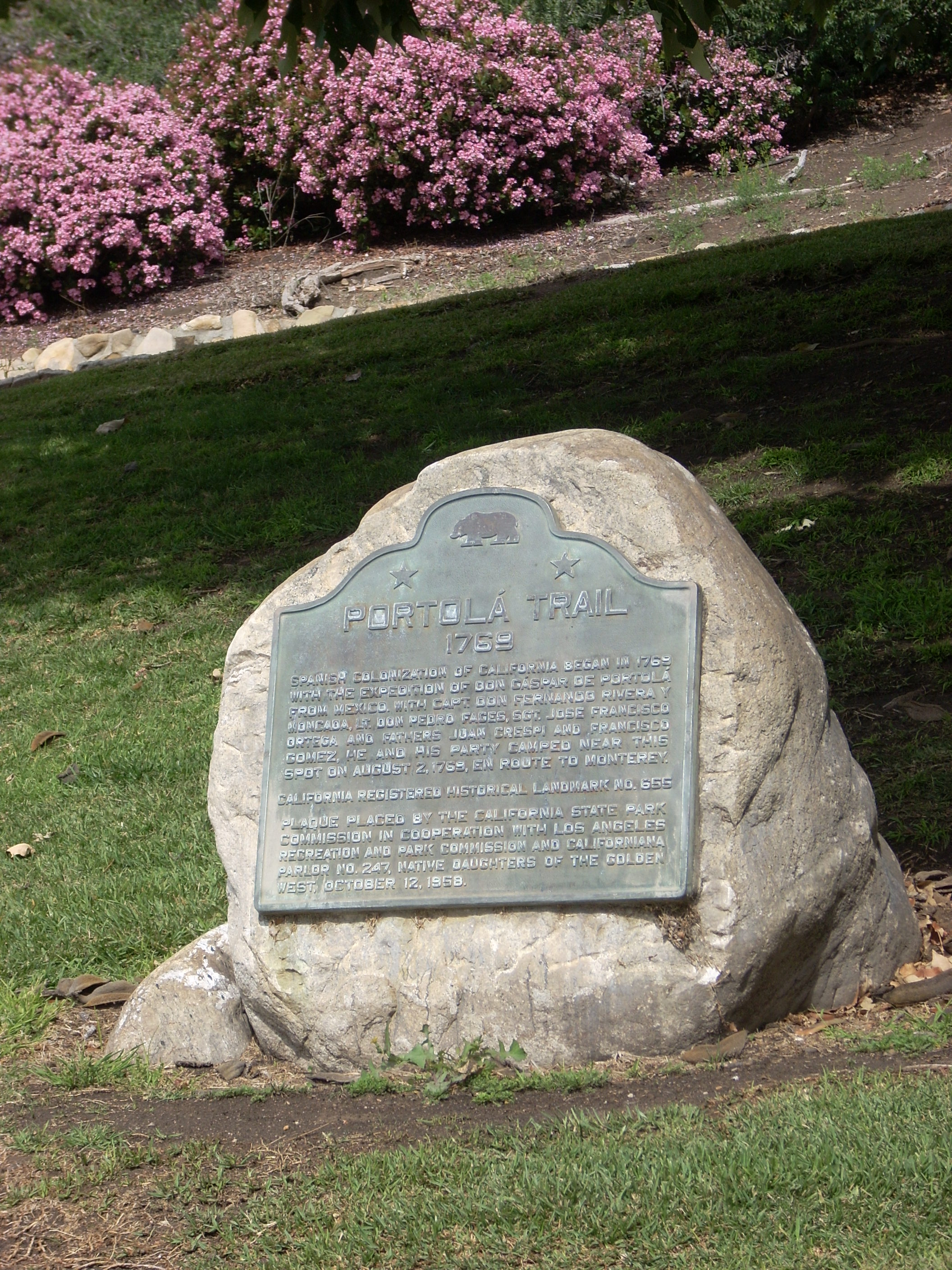
Portolá Trail historic plaque on rock in Elysian Park in Los Angeles, near the North Broadway-Buena Vista St. Bridge (CHL 655)

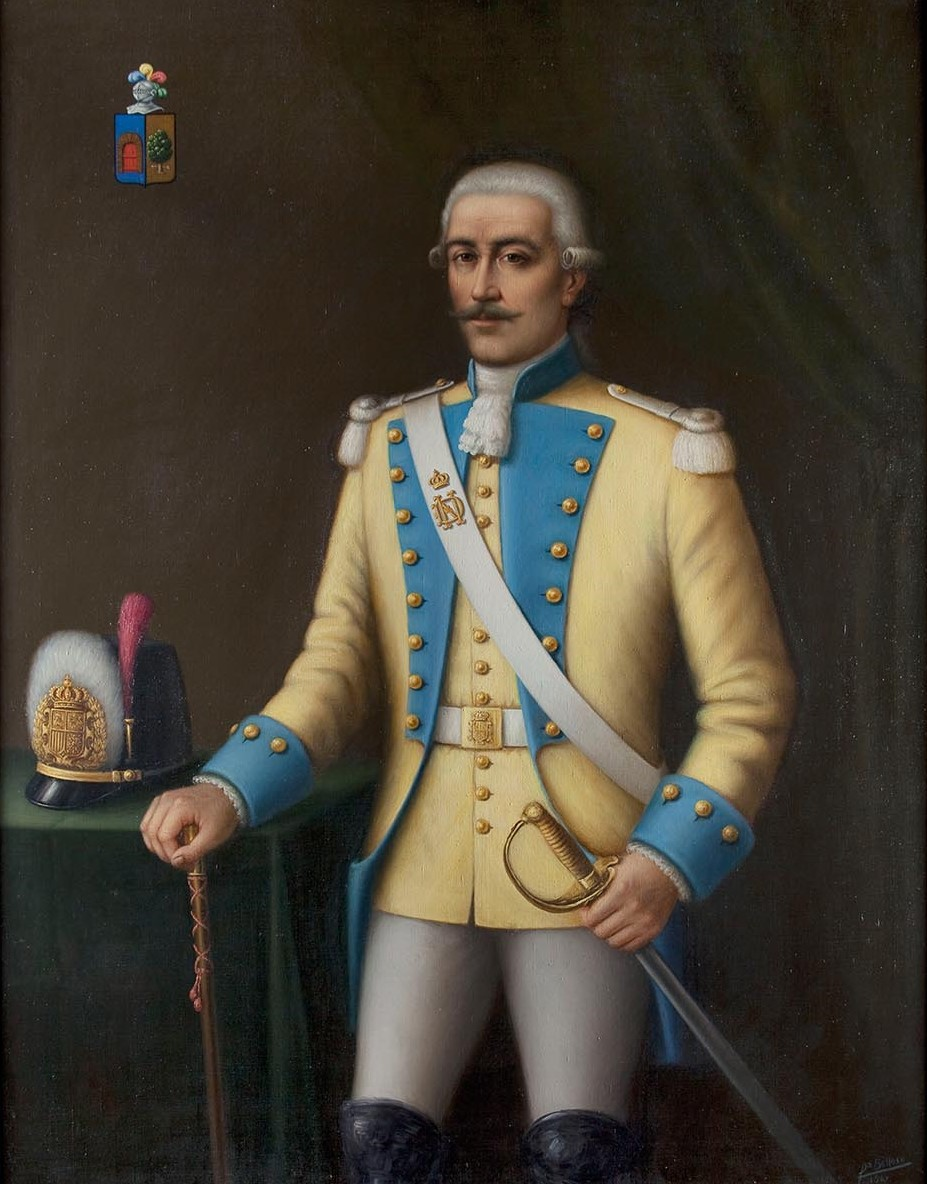
Gaspar de Portolá

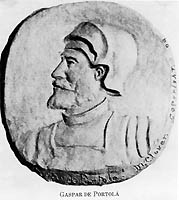
Gaspar de Portolá 1770

The Portolá Trail Campsite or Portolá Trail Campsite No. 1 is the spot of the first Europeans to travel and camp overnight in what is now Central Los Angeles, California. The Portolá expedition camped at the site on August 2, 1769. The Portolá Trail Campsite No. 1 was designated a California Historic Landmark (No.655) on Sept. 26, 1958. The Portolá Trail Campsite is located in what is now the Elysian Park entrance, at the NW corner of North Broadway and Elysian Park Drive in the City of Los Angeles in Los Angeles County. The campsite is near the Los Angeles River, which they used as their water supply for the camp. Military officer Gaspar de Portolá was the commander of the expedition for the Spanish Empire with the goal of the Spanish colonization of the Americas. The expedition led to the founding of the first mission in the Los Angeles Basin, the Mission Vieja, on September 8, 1771, and of Alta California. The expedition arrived at Portolá Trail Campsite No. 1 from the San Gabriel Valley, were the Mission San Gabriel would be built later in 1776. As they depart Portolá Trail Campsite No. 1 they traveled west towards Santa Monica Bay, stopping at Portolá Trail Campsite 2, which is in present-day Beverly Hills. Portolá Trail Campsite 2 is also a California Historic Landmark (No.665). At San Monica Bay the expedition turned and traveled north to were the future Mission San Fernando would be built in 1797. Form San Fernando the expedition turned west to Ventura, the site of the future Mission San Buenaventura built in 1782.

Listed on the State Marker 655:

- Don Gaspar de Portolá (1716–1786) – Expedition Leader would become the first Governor of the Californias.
- Captain Don Fernando Rivera y Moncada (1725–1781) – soldier and became the third Governor of The Californias.
- Lieutenant Don Pedro Fages (1734–1794) – soldier, became Lieutenant Governor under Gaspar de Portolá.
- Sgt. José Francisco Ortega (1734–1798) – soldier and early settler of Alta California. Leader of the Presidio of San Diego.
- Father Juan Crespí (1721–1782) – recorded the complete expedition. Founder of first mission in area.
- Father Francisco Gómez – served as chaplain for the expedition, a Father from Mission San Diego, later move to Mission Carmel.

== Marker ==
Marker on the site reads:

- NO. 655 PORTOLÁ TRAIL CAMPSITE (I) – Spanish colonization of California began in 1769 with the expedition of Don Gaspar de Portolá from Mexico. With Captain Don Fernando Rivera v Moncada, Lieutenant Don Pedro Fages, Sgt. José Francisco Ortega, and Fathers Juan Crespí and Francisco Gómez, he and his party camped near this spot on August 2, 1769, en route to Monterey.'

== See also ==
- California Historical Landmarks in Los Angeles County
- Spanish missions in California
- List of California Ranchos
- Ranchos of Los Angeles County, California
