= Shumaker =

Shumaker is a surname, being an Americanized form of the German surname Schumacher. Notable people with the surname include:

- Anthony Shumaker (born 1973), American baseball pitcher
- Edward Shumaker (1896-1973), American sports shooter
- John Shumaker (1929-1999), American politician
- John W. Shumaker (born 1942), American educator
- Robert H. Shumaker (born 1933), American rear admiral and naval aviator
- Taylor Shumaker (born 2006), American softball player

== See also ==
- Shumaker-Lewis House, a historic home in West Virginia, United States
- Shumaker Naval Ammunition Depot, a munitions manufacturing facility in Arkansas, United States
