= Cantelli =

Cantelli is an Italian surname. Notable people with the surname include:

- Claudio Cantelli (born 1989), Brazilian racing driver
- Francesco Paolo Cantelli (1875–1966), Italian mathematician
- Girolamo Cantelli (1815–1884), Italuan politician
- Guido Cantelli (1920–1956), Italian conductor
- Ugo Cantelli (1903–1972), Italian sport shooter
