= William Harding (sport shooter) =

American sports shooter

Personal information
- Born: September 23, 1910 Shreveport, Louisiana, United States
- Died: August 18, 1936 (aged 25) Otsego, Michigan, United States

Sport
- Sport: Sports shooting

William Harding (September 23, 1910 – August 18, 1936) was an American sports shooter. He competed in the 50 m rifle, prone event at the 1932 Summer Olympics. Harding was a US Army officer, and was killed in a training flight.
