= Arnulfo Hernández =

Mexican sports shooter

Personal information
- Born: 31 December 1903 Rioverde, San Luis Potosí, Mexico
- Died: 19 January 1991 (aged 87)

Sport
- Sport: Sports shooting

Arnulfo Hernández (31 December 1903 – 19 January 1991) was a Mexican sports shooter. He competed in the 25 m rapid fire pistol event at the 1932 Summer Olympics.
