= 2009 swine flu pandemic in Venezuela =

2009 swine flu outbreak in Venezuela
- Confirmed cases Deaths confirmed
- Disease: Swine flu
- Pathogen: H1N1
- Arrival date: 28 May 2009
- Confirmed cases: 2,545
- Suspected cases: 11,160
- Deaths: 115

The Influenza A (H1N1), also known as the swine flu, was detected in Venezuela on 28 May. The first infected person was a 22-year-old man who had recently traveled to Panama.

== Timeline ==
=== May ===
May 28: The disease was first detected in Venezuela, when a man from San Antonio de Los Altos, Miranda returned infected from Panama. "This citizen traveled to Panama on an activity of the Rotary Club, which was held on a hotel, which was attended by 150 people from seven countries" declared the minister. According to the Bolivarian News Agency and health authorities, the patient was perfectly fine, He was not critical and was in isolation, to prevent him from spreading the disease to others .

May 29: The second case was confirmed. It was a couple who had traveled with him to Panama.

May 31: The third case confirmed, his mother was infected.

=== June ===
June 3: A new case confirmed, making it the fourth in the country. The infected person was a young man, who came from Brazil, detected on the Aeropuerto Internacional de Maiquetía Simón Bolívar.

June 7: 8 new cases confirmed. They were from Colombia, Panama, France and the United States.

June 9: First case detected on Táchira State, coming from a 50-year-old woman, who had recently come from the United States. The number of cases rose to 14.

June 10: 25 cases confirmed in total. Two girls from 4 and 11 years old are reported on the Vargas State.

June 12: The number of cases rose to 37. 5 of them are from Anzoátegui, 1 on Zulia, 1 on Aragua and another one on the Miranda State.

June 13: By this day, the number of cases was of 40, even although the Ministry of Health had announced the day before that the total number of cases was of 37, he had omitted 2 cases .

June 14: 44 cases confirmed up to date. 4 cases were confirmed on Nueva Esparta, Aragua, Mérida State and Miranda (One case per state).

June 16: 52 total cases in Venezuela. 7 new cases, 4 of them are located on Aragua, and the remaining 3 on Miranda.

June 17: The health authorities placed an ocean cruiser on quarantine with more than 1.300 persons on board on Isla Margarita, since 3 persons were positive on the A (H1N1) virus exam. 8 new cases confirmed, increasing the total to 60, 4 on Miranda, 2 on Carabobo, 1 on Aragua and 1 on Anzoátegui.

June 20: For this date, the number of cases was 92, distributed in these regions: Anzoátegui: 17, Apure: 1, Aragua: 13, Bolivar: 2, Capital District: 2, Carabobo: 3, Guarico: 1, Lara: 1, Mérida: 6, Miranda: 29, Nueva Esparta: 3, Táchira: 6, Vargas: 2 and Zulia: 6. Portal-Ministerio del Poder Popular para la Salud-Venezuela – Content

== Cases by regions ==
Cases by federal entity
Federal entity	Confirmed	Suspected	Deaths
Capital District	419	1,562	5
Miranda	388	1,148	7
Zulia	210	951	9
Mérida	178	854	0
Carabobo	156	699	2
Anzoátegui	146	523	0
Aragua	133	659	11
Táchira	130	478	0
Lara	94	469	2
Bolívar	84	402	11
Monagas	67	375	11
Trujillo	62	410	0
Nueva Esparta	57	270	3
Yaracuy	48	246	1
Cojedes	48	199	0
Guárico	48	199	0
Apure	46	170	0
Falcón	45	207	1
Vargas	42	235	0
Barinas	42	226	1
Sucre	36	347	2
Amazonas	26	160	0
Portuguesa	22	300	0
Delta Amacuro	18	71	0
Total	2,545	11,160	115

== Reaction ==
Due to the increasing number cases on the neighbour countries, the president of the National Institute of Hygiene, Jesús Querales, assured last June 4, that the Venezuelan authorities would keep their efforts on the epidemiological surveillance in order to prevent the propagation of the virus. According to the president, he said that the country has the necessary resources to fight the virus.

== See also ==
- COVID-19 pandemic in Venezuela
