= Rom Stanifer =

American sports shooter

Personal information
- Born: February 4, 1904 Dublin, Texas, United States
- Died: August 22, 1970 (aged 66) Altus, Oklahoma, United States

Sport
- Sport: Sports shooting

Rom Stanifer (February 24, 1904 – August 22, 1970) was an American sports shooter. He competed in the 50 m rifle, prone event at the 1932 Summer Olympics.
