= Carlos Guerrero (sport shooter) =

Mexican sports shooter

Personal information
- Born: 1891 Valle de Santiago, Mexico
- Died: Unknown

Sport
- Sport: Sports shooting

Carlos Guerrero (born 1891, date of death unknown) was a Mexican sports shooter. He competed in the 50 m rifle, prone event at the 1932 Summer Olympics.
