= La Cienega Park =

Park in Beverly Hills, California

- Interactive map of La Cienega Park
- Type: Urban park
- Location: Beverly Hills, California
- Coordinates: 34°3′45″N 118°22′34″W
- Area: 9.75 acres (3.95 ha)
- Status: Open all year

La Cienega Park (from the Spanish la ciénaga, meaning "the swamp") is a public park in Beverly Hills, California.

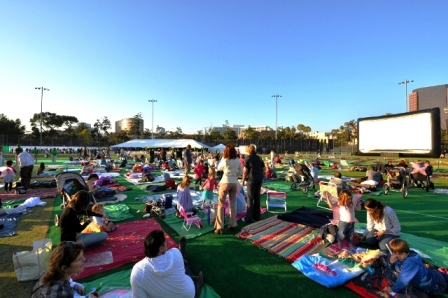
Movie Premiere at La Cienega Park

The park includes three baseball diamonds, two soccer fields, a jogging track, a playground, multiple tennis courts, and a community center. The park is managed and administered by Beverly Hills.

The park covers area on both sides of La Cienega Boulevard, between Gregory Way and Shumacher Drive.

A California marker is at the park noting the spot of Portolá Trail Campsite No. 2 that was designated a California Historic Landmark (No. 665) on November 5, 1958.
