= Bráz Magaldi =

Brazilian sports shooter

Personal information
- Born: 9 June 1897 Minas Gerais, Brazil
- Died: 30 July 1987 (aged 90) Minas Gerais, Brazil

Sport
- Sport: Sports shooting

Bráz Magaldi (9 June 1897 – 30 July 1987) was a Brazilian sports shooter. He competed in the 25 m rapid fire pistol event at the 1932 Summer Olympics.
