= Luther Roberts =

American sports shooter

Personal information
- Born: June 30, 1902 Nevada, Missouri, United States
- Died: August 3, 1972 (aged 70) Escondido, California, United States

Sport
- Sport: Sports shooting

Luther Roberts (June 30, 1902 – August 3, 1972) was an American sports shooter. He competed in the 25 m rapid fire pistol event at the 1932 Summer Olympics.
