= Eugenio do Amaral =

Brazilian sports shooter

Eugenio Caetano do Amaral
Personal information
- Born: March 1896 Curitiba, Brazil
- Died: 20 December 1970 (aged 74)

Sport
- Sport: Sports shooting

Eugenio Caetano do Amaral (March 1896 – 20 December 1970) was a Brazilian sports shooter. He competed in the 25 m rapid fire pistol event at the 1932 Summer Olympics.
