= José Castro (sport shooter) =

Brazilian sports shooter

Personal information
- Born: 4 April 1906 Rio de Janeiro, Brazil
- Died: 29 September 1965 (aged 59) Rio de Janeiro, Brazil

Sport
- Sport: Sports shooting

José Castro (4 April 1906 – 29 September 1965) was a Brazilian sports shooter. He competed in the 50 m rifle, prone event at the 1932 Summer Olympics.
