= Antal Barát-Lemberkovits =

Hungarian sports shooter

Personal information
- Born: 13 June 1903 Négyes, Austria-Hungary
- Died: 16 October 1980 (aged 77)

Sport
- Sport: Sports shooting

Antal Barát-Lemberkovits (13 June 1903 – 16 October 1980) was a Hungarian sports shooter who won more than 30 national titles. He competed in the 50 m rifle, prone event at the 1932 Summer Olympics. He later changed his name to Antal Simonfay and emigrated to Argentina.
