= Thomas Carr (sport shooter) =

American sports shooter

Personal information
- Born: August 9, 1905 Butte, Montana, United States
- Died: August 19, 1955 (aged 50) Imperial County, California, United States

Sport
- Sport: Sports shooting

Thomas Carr (August 9, 1905 – August 19, 1955) was an American sports shooter. He competed in the 25 m rapid fire pistol event at the 1932 Summer Olympics.
