= Darvinson Rojas =

Venezuelan journalist (born 1994)

- Born: 2 July 1994 (age 31)
- Occupation: Journalist

Darvinson Rojas Sánchez (born 2 July 1994) is a Venezuelan journalist. Rojas has worked for the Monitor de Víctimas project collecting data about violent attacks, and covered information relating to the COVID-19 pandemic in Venezuela.

== Detention ==
At 8:32 p.m. local time on the night of 21 March 2020, Rojas started live-tweeting on social media about the special forces arriving at his house in Caracas, when they requested "collaboration" and asked that he follow them to their command, giving him the assurance that they had received an anonymous call reporting a case of COVID-19 and would tell him more if he opened the door. For at least half an hour, the special forces insisted that Rojas go with them before, at 9:04 p.m., they broke down his door and then at 9:10 p.m. Rojas' social media link was lost. He had been denouncing that the agents were trying to break the door without any warrant.

Rojas was arrested by officers of the Venezuelan National Police (PNB) and around fifteen armed agents of the special forces. His parents, Jesús Rojas and Mirian Sánchez, were also detained; all their computers and mobile phones were seized. Rojas' parents were later released.

According to the Venezuelan press association (SNTP), the detention was in relation to Rojas' recent publications about the spread of the coronavirus disease in Venezuela. The SNTP also said that the detention had been criticized by the director for the Americas of the Human Rights Watch, José Miguel Vivanco, and the Americas director for Amnesty International, Érika Guevara-Rosas, who added that Rojas had investigated Venezuela's pandemic coverage and was reporting on the existence of more cases than the government would admit to.

On 24 March, the SNTP denounced that Darvinson was presented in the tribunals "illegally" and "clandestinely".

After 12 days incarcerated, Darvinson Rojas was set free on 3 April 2020 under precautionary measures.

== See also ==
- Political prisoners in Venezuela
