= Arturo Villanueva =

Mexican sports shooter

General de Div. Arturo Villanueva Galeana
Personal information
- Born: 17 January 1896
- Died: 11 September 1980 (aged 84)

Sport
- Country: Mexico
- Sport: Sports shooting

Arturo Villanueva (17 January 1896 – 11 September 1980) was a Mexican sports shooter. He competed in the 25 m rapid fire pistol event at the 1932 Summer Olympics.
