= Antônio da Silveira =

Brazilian sports shooter

Personal information
- Born: 9 March 1906 Piracicaba, Brazil
- Died: 4 June 1990 (aged 96)

Sport
- Sport: Sports shooting

Antônio da Silveira (9 March 1906 – 4 June 1990) was a Brazilian sports shooter. He competed in the 25 m rapid fire pistol event at the 1932 Summer Olympics.
