= Amedeo Bruni =

Italian sports shooter

Personal information
- Born: 18 October 1906 Acquaviva Picena, Italy
- Died: 1 November 1991 (aged 85) Rome, Italy

Sport
- Sport: Sports shooting

Amedeo Bruni (18 October 1906 – 1 November 1991) was an Italian sports shooter. He competed in the 50 m rifle, prone event at the 1932 Summer Olympics.
