= Ernest Tippin =

American sports shooter

Personal information
- Born: April 7, 1890 Mankato, Kansas, United States
- Died: October 30, 1958 (aged 68)

Sport
- Sport: Sports shooting

Ernest Tippin (April 7, 1890 – October 30, 1958) was an American sports shooter. He competed in the 25 m rapid fire pistol event at the 1932 Summer Olympics.
