= Elysian Park Fault =

Coordinates: 34°04′N 118°14′W

Elysian Park Fault is an active blind thrust fault located in Central Los Angeles, California. Approximately 20 km (12.4 miles) long, the fault is believed to able to produce a destructive earthquake of magnitude 6.2–6.7, about every 500–1,300 years, similar in size and frequency to the 1971 San Fernando earthquake or 1994 Northridge earthquake.

== See also ==
- Elysian Park, Los Angeles
