= Renzo Morigi =

Italian sport shooter

Renzo Morigi (Lorenzo Mario Morigi)
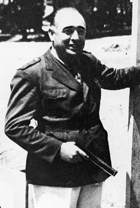
- Renzo Morigi, was an Italian sport shooter.

Personal information
- Born: Lorenzo Mario Morigi; 28 December 1895 Ravenna, Italy
- Died: 13 April 1962 (aged 66) Bologna, Italy

Sport
- Sport: Sports shooting
Medal record
Men's shooting
Representing Italy
Olympic Games
Gold medal – first place	1932 Los Angeles	25 m rapid fire pistol

Renzo Morigi (28 December 1895 – 13 April 1962) was an Italian pistol sports shooter who competed in the 1932 Summer Olympics. In 1932, he won the gold medal in the 25 metre rapid fire pistol event.

== Personal life ==
Morigi served in the Italian Army in World War I, and joined the National Fascist Party in 1921. Morigi led Squadristi actions through Emilia.
