= Zoltán Soós-Ruszka Hradetzky =

Hungarian sport shooter (1902–1992)

Personal information
- Born: 16 April 1902 Budapest, Austria-Hungary
- Died: 8 July 1992 (aged 90) Kansas City, Missouri, United States

Sport
- Sport: Sports shooting
Medal record
Men's shooting
Representing Hungary
Olympic Games
Bronze medal – third place	1932 Los Angeles	50 m rifle, prone

Zoltán Soós-Ruszka Hradetzky (16 April 1902 – 8 July 1992) was a Hungarian sport shooter who competed at the 1932 Summer Olympics and 1936 Summer Olympics. In 1932 he won the bronze medal in the 50 metre rifle, prone competition.
