= Bertil Rönnmark =

Swedish sport shooter

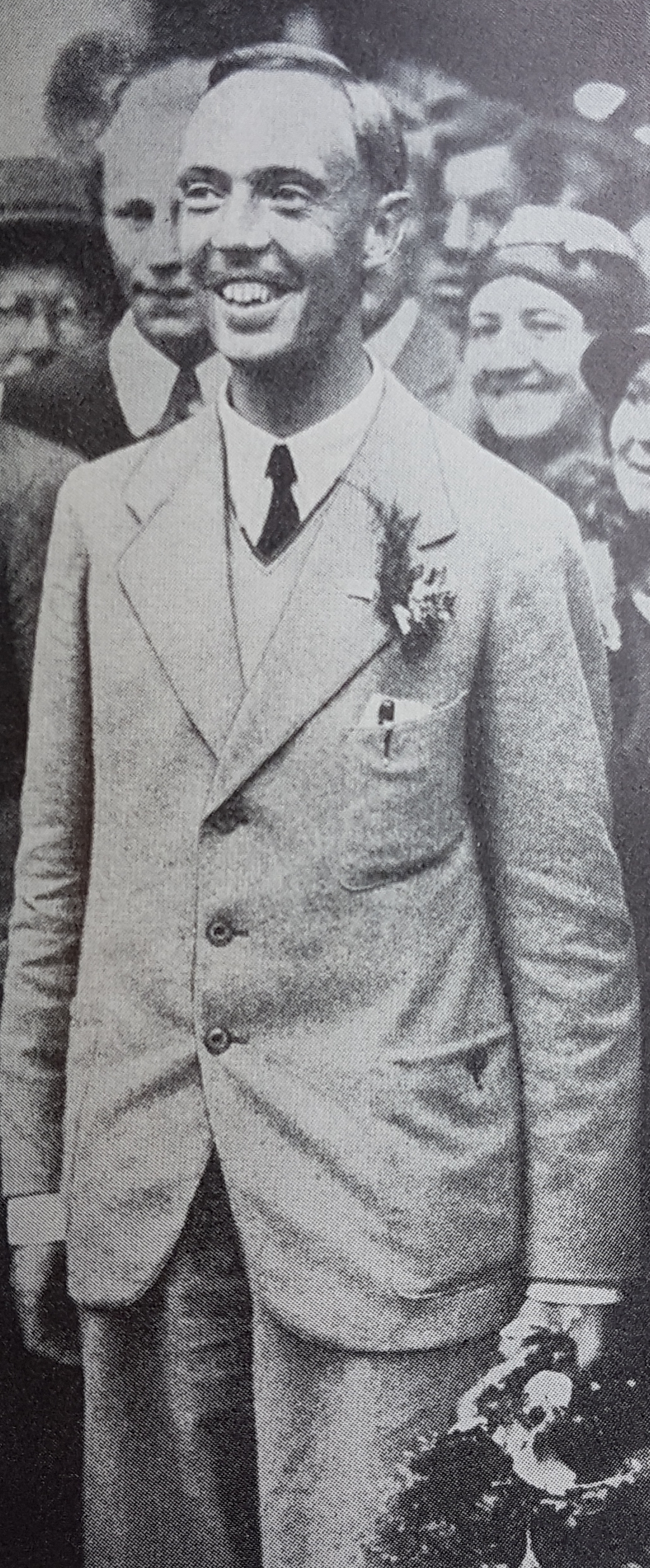

Personal information
- Nationality: Swedish
- Born: 24 December 1905 Jämshög, Sweden
- Died: 1 April 1967 (aged 61) Enskede-Årsta, Sweden

Sport
- Country: Sweden
- Sport: Sports shooting
Medal record
Men's shooting
Representing Sweden
Olympic Games
Gold medal – first place	1932 Los Angeles	50 m rifle, prone

Bertil Vilhelm Rönnmark (24 December 1905 – 1 April 1967) was a Swedish rifle sports shooter who competed in the 1932 Summer Olympics and in the 1936 Summer Olympics.

In 1932 he won the gold medal in the 50 metre rifle prone event.

Four years later he finished eighth in the 50 metre rifle prone competition.
