= José González (Spanish sport shooter) =

Spanish sports shooter

Personal information
- Born: 21 February 1907 Zamora, Spain

Sport
- Sport: Sports shooting

José González (born 21 February 1907, date of death unknown) was a Spanish sports shooter. He competed in the 25 m rapid fire pistol event at the 1932 Summer Olympics.
