= Manuel Corrales (sport shooter) =

Spanish sports shooter

Personal information
- Born: 11 December 1896 Zamora, Spain
- Died: October 1936 Madrid, Spain

Sport
- Sport: Sports shooting

Manuel Corrales (18 December 1896 – October 1936) was a Spanish sports shooter. He competed in the 25 m rapid fire pistol and 50 m rifle events at the 1932 Summer Olympics. He was killed during the Spanish Civil War in 1936 aged 39.
