= Edward Shumaker =

American sports shooter

Personal information
- Born: January 27, 1896 Beaver, Pennsylvania, United States
- Died: May 27, 1973 (aged 77) Canton, Ohio, United States

Sport
- Sport: Sports shooting

Edward Shumaker (January 27, 1896 – May 27, 1973) was an American sports shooter. He competed in the 50 m rifle, prone event at the 1932 Summer Olympics.
