= Buenaventura Bagaria =

Spanish sports shooter (1882–1947)

Personal information
- Born: 1882 Lles de Cerdanya, Spain
- Died: 15 April 1947 (aged 64–65) Barcelona, Spain

Sport
- Sport: Sports shooting

Buenaventura Bagaria (1882 – 15 April 1947) was a Spanish sports shooter. He competed in the 50 m rifle, prone event at the 1932 Summer Olympics.
