= Gustavo Huet =

Mexican sport shooter

Personal information
- Born: 22 November 1912 Mexico City, Mexico
- Died: 20 November 1951 (aged 38) Puebla, Mexico

Sport
- Sport: Sport shooting
Medal record
Men's shooting
Representing Mexico
Olympic Games
Silver medal – second place	1932 Los Angeles	50 m rifle, prone

Gustavo Huet Bobadilla (22 November 1912 – 20 November 1951) was a Mexican athlete. He was born in Mexico City, Mexico. He competed in shooting and represented Mexico at the 1932 Summer Olympics in Los Angeles. He won a silver medal in the Men's 50 meter rifle, prone.
