= Ugo Cantelli =

Italian sports shooter

Personal information
- Born: 30 March 1903 Gaggio Montano, Italy
- Died: 23 April 1972 (aged 69) Rome, Italy

Sport
- Sport: Sports shooting

Ugo Cantelli (30 March 1903 – 23 April 1972) was an Italian sports shooter. He competed in the 50 m rifle, prone event at the 1932 Summer Olympics.
