= Julio Castro Méndez =

Venezuelan doctor

Julio Castro Méndez is a Venezuelan doctor who specializes in infectious diseases and internal medicine.

== Career ==
Castro has served as an infectious medicine doctor at the Metropolitan Polyclinic, director of the organization Doctors for Health, member of the Venezuelan Society of Infectious Diseases and professor at the Institute of Tropical Medicine at the Central University of Venezuela.

Since 2019, Julio Castro is part of Plan País program under National Assembly President Juan Guaidó.

On 15 March 2020, during the coronavirus pandemic of that year and after two cases were confirmed in Venezuela, Juan Guaidó announced the creation of a Commission of Health Experts to deal with the pandemic, a commission composed of Doctors and academic experts in different specialties, including Julio Castro, who heads the commission, Gustavo Villasmil, from the Venezuelan Society of Internal Medicine, and Edgar Capriles, specialist in Health Economics, among others.
