= Sigfrido Vogel =

Argentine sports shooter

Personal information
- Born: September 1912 Córdoba, Argentina

Sport
- Sport: Sports shooting

Sigfrido Vogel (born September 1912, date of death unknown) was an Argentine sports shooter. He competed in the 50 m rifle, prone event at the 1932 Summer Olympics.
