= Mission Vieja =

California historic landmark

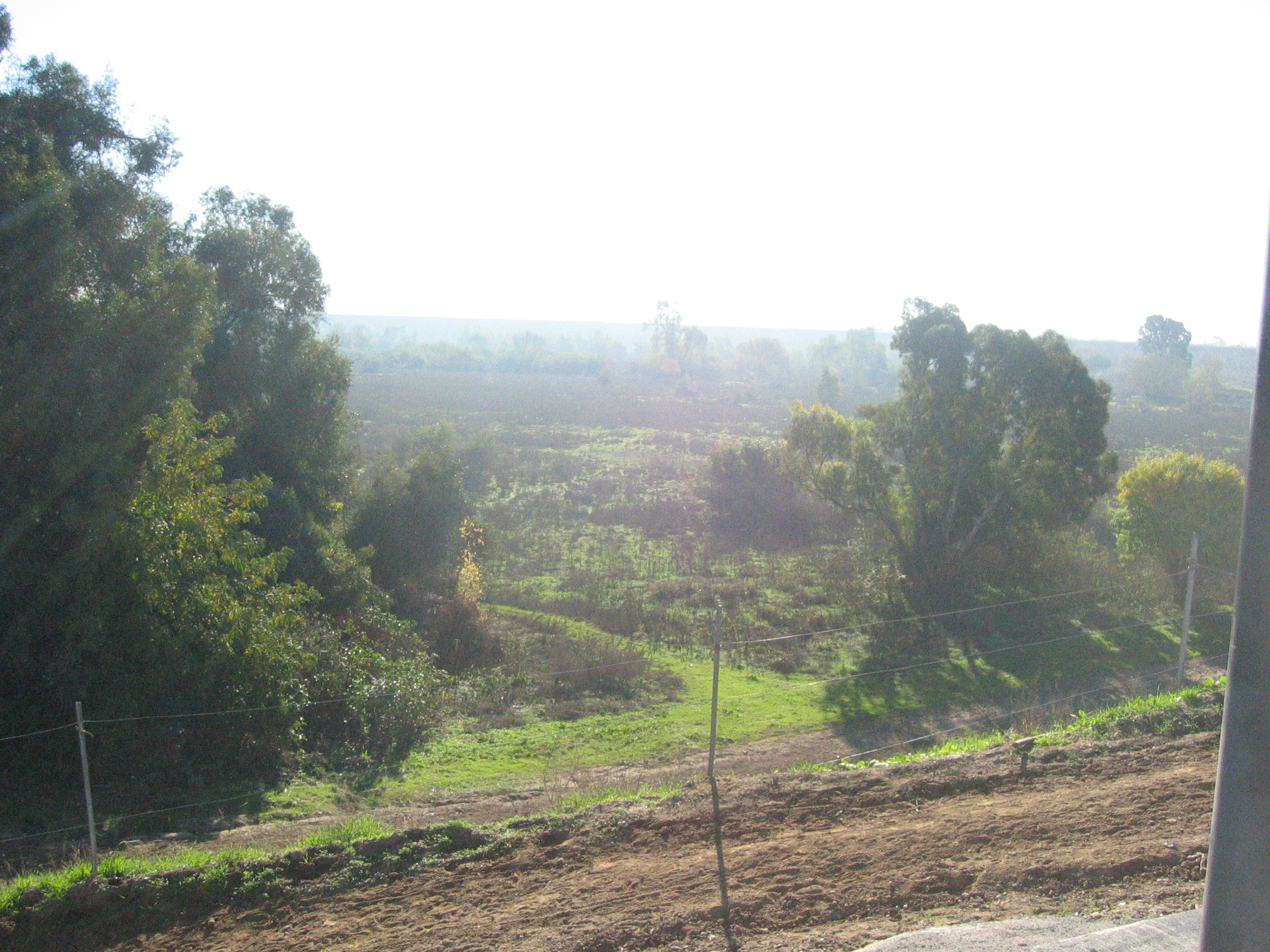
- Whittier Narrows, location of Mission Vieja from 1771 to 1776

- Location within the Los Angeles metropolitan area
- 34°01′51″N 118°04′24″W
- Location: Montebello, California

History
- Built: 1771

California Historical Landmark
- Designated: Jan. 11, 1935
- Reference no.: 161

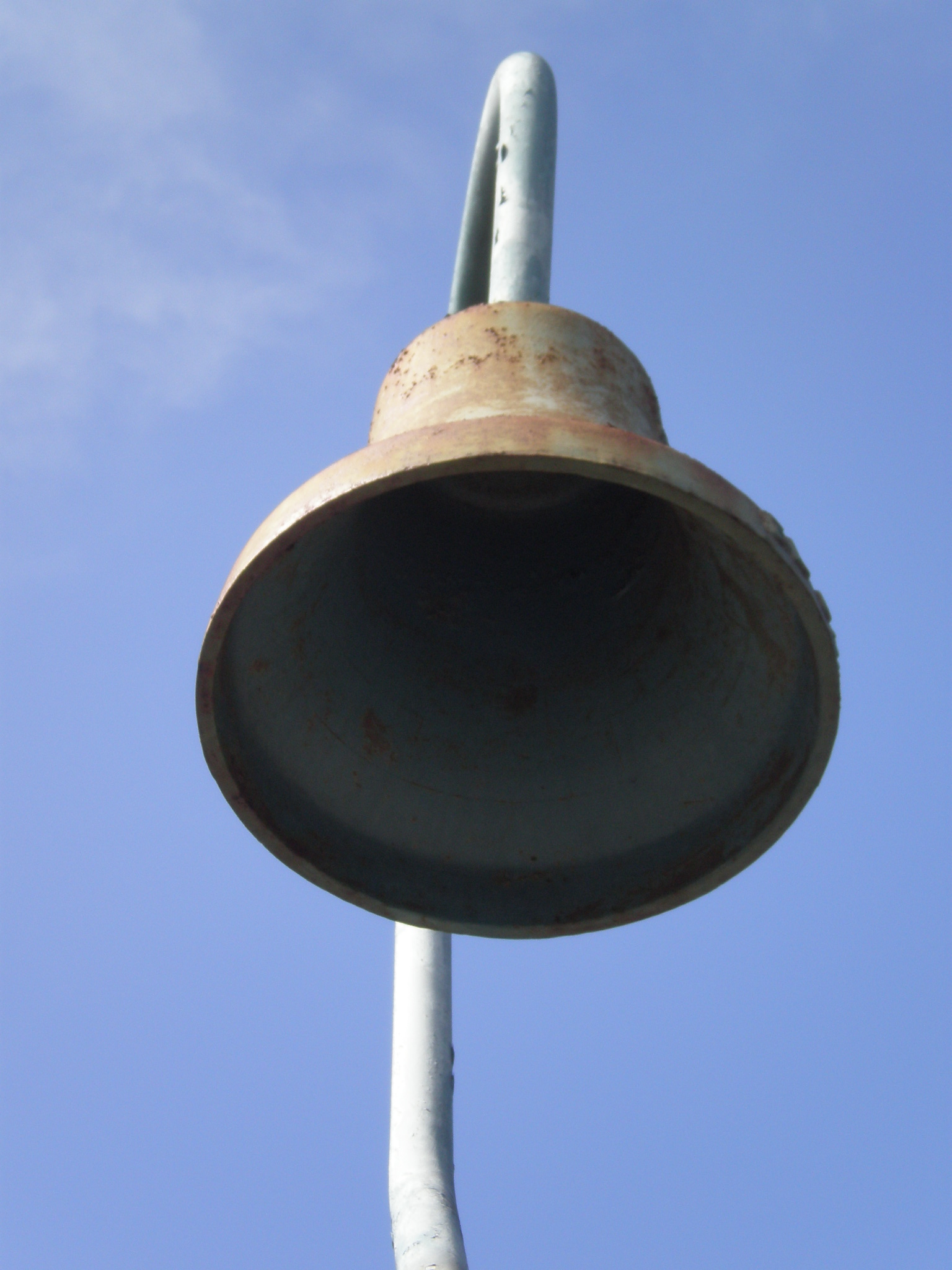
El Camino Real bell

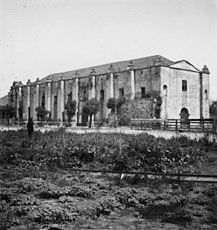
Mission San Gabriel Arcángel c. 1900, built after Misión Vieja flood of 1776. The trail in the foreground is part of the original El Camino Real.

The Mission Vieja or Misión Vieja or the Old Mission was the first Spanish mission in the San Gabriel Valley. Mission Vieja was built in 1771 by what would become the fathers of the Mission San Gabriel Arcángel. The Mission Vieja site was designated a California Historic Landmark (No.161) on Jan. 11, 1935. The location of Mission Vieja is at what is now the South West corner North San Gabriel Blvd and North Lincoln Ave in Montebello, California. The site has a plaque marker and an El Camino Real Bell. Mission Vieja was the first building in the San Gabriel Valley and Los Angeles County.

== History ==
Father Juan Crespí picked the spot for Mission Vieja because water was available at what is now called the Whittier Narrows. The place for Mission Vieja was found in the expedition of Portolá in the summer of 1769. Gaspar de Portolá, Miguel Costansó and Father Juan Crespí recorded the expedition. In 1771 the fathers of Pedro Cambon and the fathers of Angel Somera, with a decree from Governor Pedro Fages, set out to build a mission in the Spanish Empire of Alta California, in what is now called the Los Angeles Basin. The first building was 45 by 18 feet made of adobe and wood. The roof was made with tule reeds from the waters of the Whittier Narrows. The building had around it a weak Palisade fence. Father Angel Somera and Father Pedro Cambon, both Franciscan missionaries, founded Mission Vieja, the original Mission San Gabriel Arcangel, on September 8, 1771; the location is today near the intersection of San Gabriel Boulevard and the Rio Hondo River. The establishment of the mission marked the beginning of the Los Angeles region's settlement by Spaniards and the fourth of twenty-one missions ultimately established along California's El Camino Real. The mission did well initially as a farm and cattle ranch. Six years after its founding, however, a destructive flood in 1776 led the mission fathers to relocate the mission five miles north, to its current location in what is the present day City of San Gabriel.

During the early years of the mission's existence, the region operated under a "Rancho" land grant system. The current city of Montebello consists of land from Rancho San Antonio, Rancho La Merced, and Rancho Paso de Bartolo. The Juan Matias Sanchez Adobe, built in 1844, still stands at the center of old Rancho la Merced in East Montebello. Recently restored, Rancho la Merced is the Montebello's oldest standing structure.

== 1769 earthquake ==
The earliest reported San Andreas Fault earthquake in California was on July 28, 1769, at the future site of the Mission Vieja. The earthquake was recorded by members the Portolá Spanish expedition charting a land route from San Diego to Monterey. Ship captains in California and other explorers also documented earthquakes. Based on the records the earthquake was moderate to strong earthquake. Some expedition diaries noted it as violent, and over a few days, aftershocks. The next large quake on this fault was the 1987 Whittier Narrows earthquake.

== Marker ==
Marker on the site reads:

- NO. 161 SITE OF MISSION VIEJA – 'Mission Vieja,' Old Mission, was the name given to the first buildings erected, and later abandoned, by the fathers for Mission San Gabriel Arcángel. The permanent buildings for the mission were located about five miles distant.

== See also ==
- California Historical Landmarks in Los Angeles County
- Spanish missions in California
- List of California Ranchos
- Ranchos of Los Angeles County, California
- Rancho Mission Viejo
