= Elysian Park, Los Angeles =

Neighborhood in Los Angeles, California

Elysian Park
- Neighborhood of Los Angeles
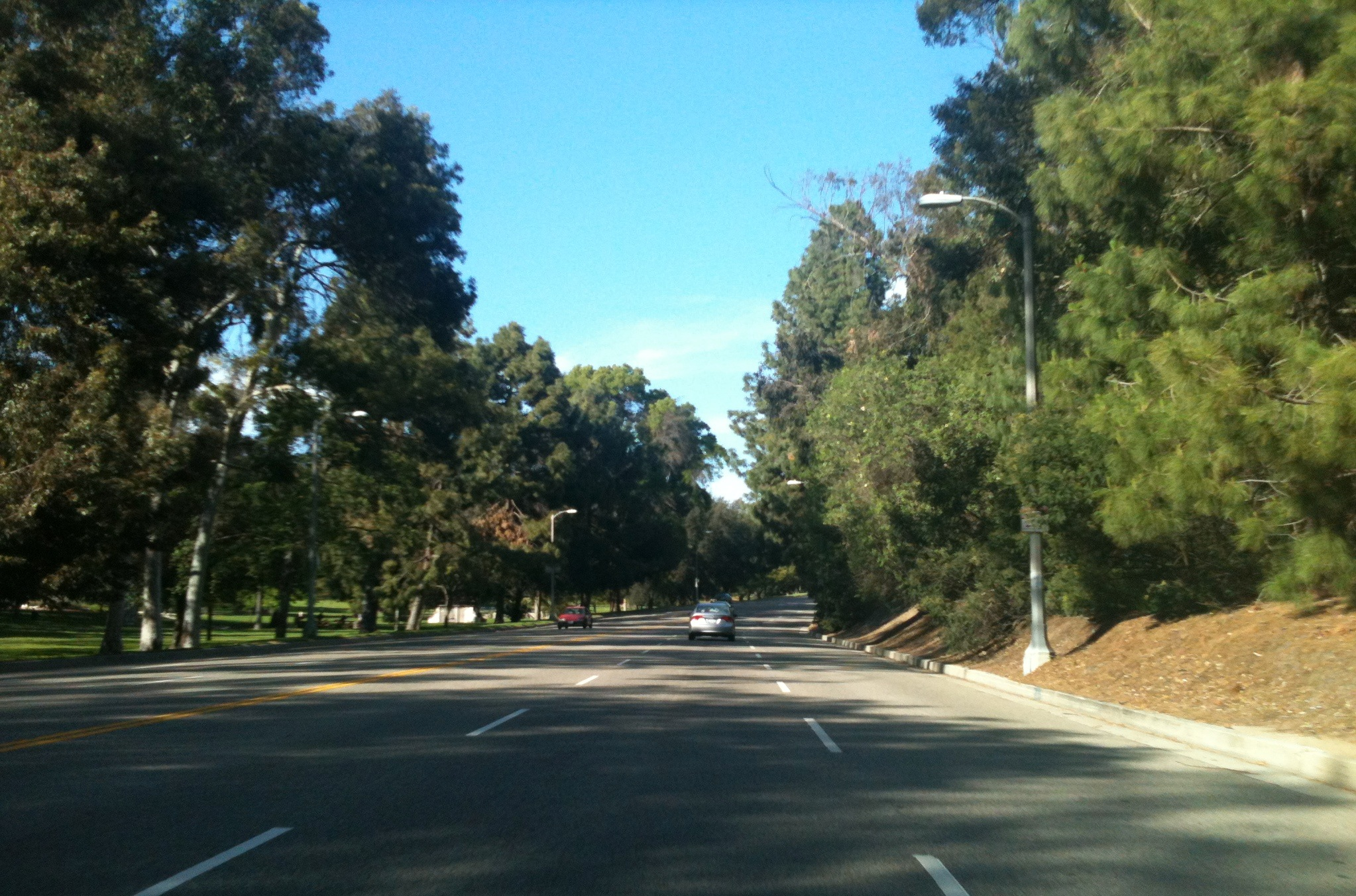

- Location in Central Los Angeles Location in Los Angeles Metropolitan Area
- Coordinates: 34°04′50″N 118°14′29″W
- Country: United States
- State: California
- County: Los Angeles
- City: Los Angeles
- Time zone: Pacific
- Area code: 213/323

Elysian Park is a neighborhood in Central Los Angeles, California, United States. The city park, Elysian Park, and Dodger Stadium are within the neighborhood, as are an all-boys Catholic high school and an elementary school.

== History ==
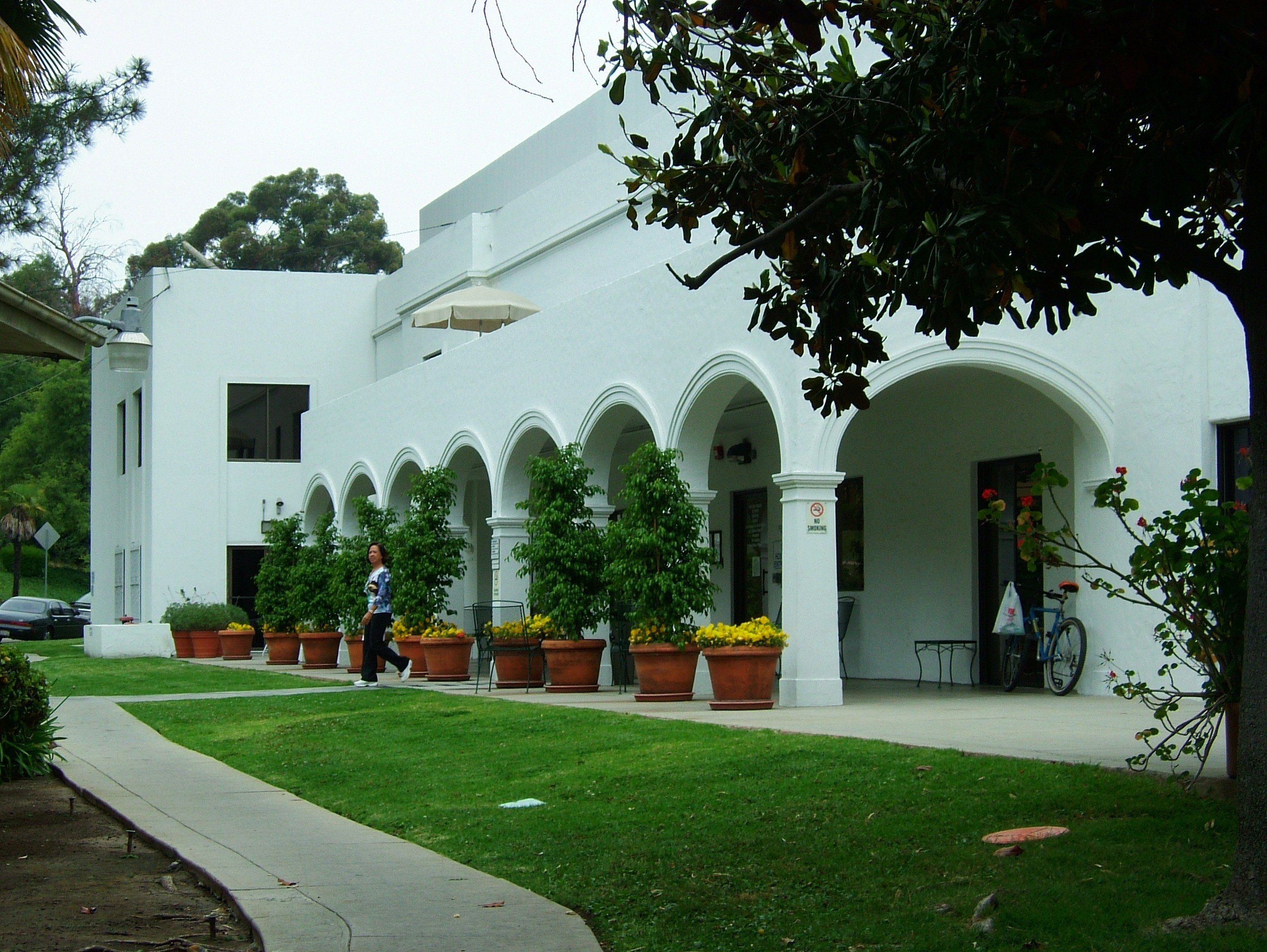
Historic Barlow Respiratory Hospital first opened in 1902.

On August 2, 1769, the Portolá expedition (the first Europeans to see inland areas of California) camped close to the Los Angeles River near what is now the southeastern corner of the city park. California Historical Landmark #655 (Portolá Trail Campsite) is at the park's Meadow Road entrance.

== Geography ==
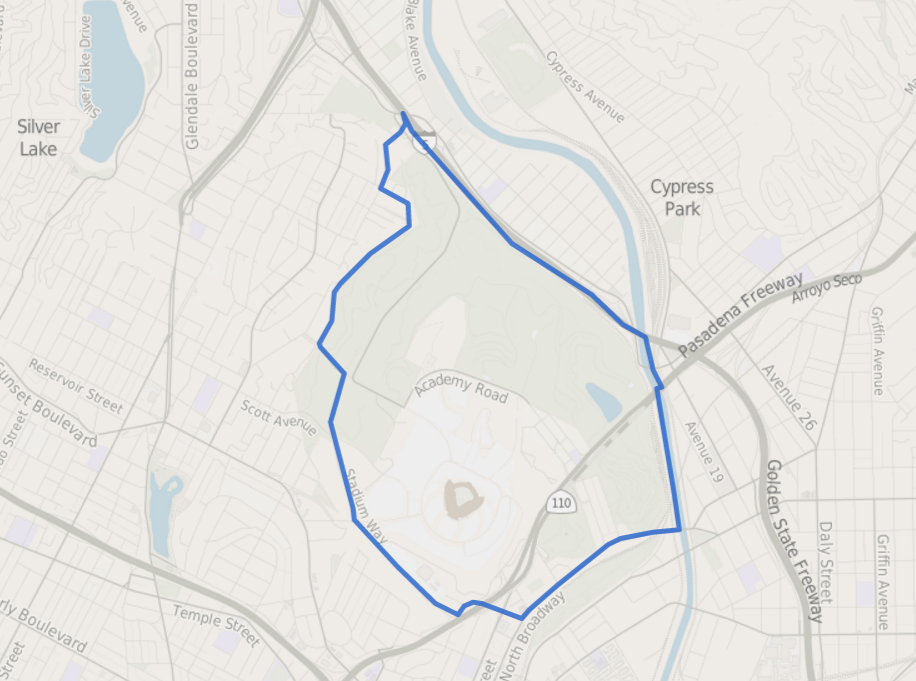
Elysian Park neighborhood boundaries

According to the Mapping L.A. project of the Los Angeles Times, the Elysian Park neighborhood is flanked on the north and northeast by Elysian Valley, on the east by Lincoln Heights, on the southeast and south by Chinatown and on the southwest, west and northwest by Echo Park. Street and other boundaries are: the northern apex at Exit 138 of the Golden State Freeway, thence southeasterly along the freeway, southerly along the Los Angeles River, westerly along North Broadway, northwesterly along Stadium Way, Academy Road and northerly along Elysian Park Drive.

== Demographics ==
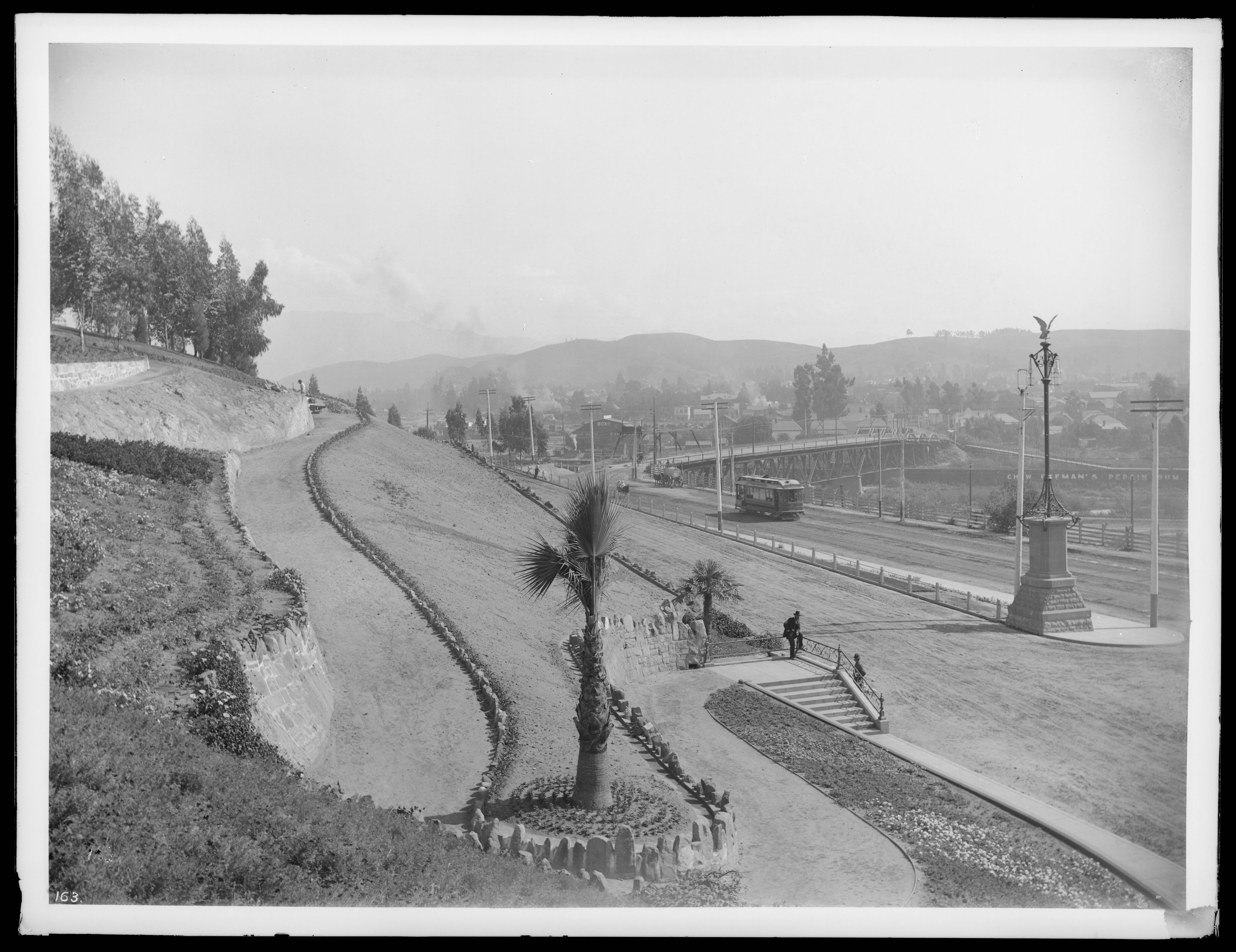
Park entrance, with Broadway on the right, about 1900

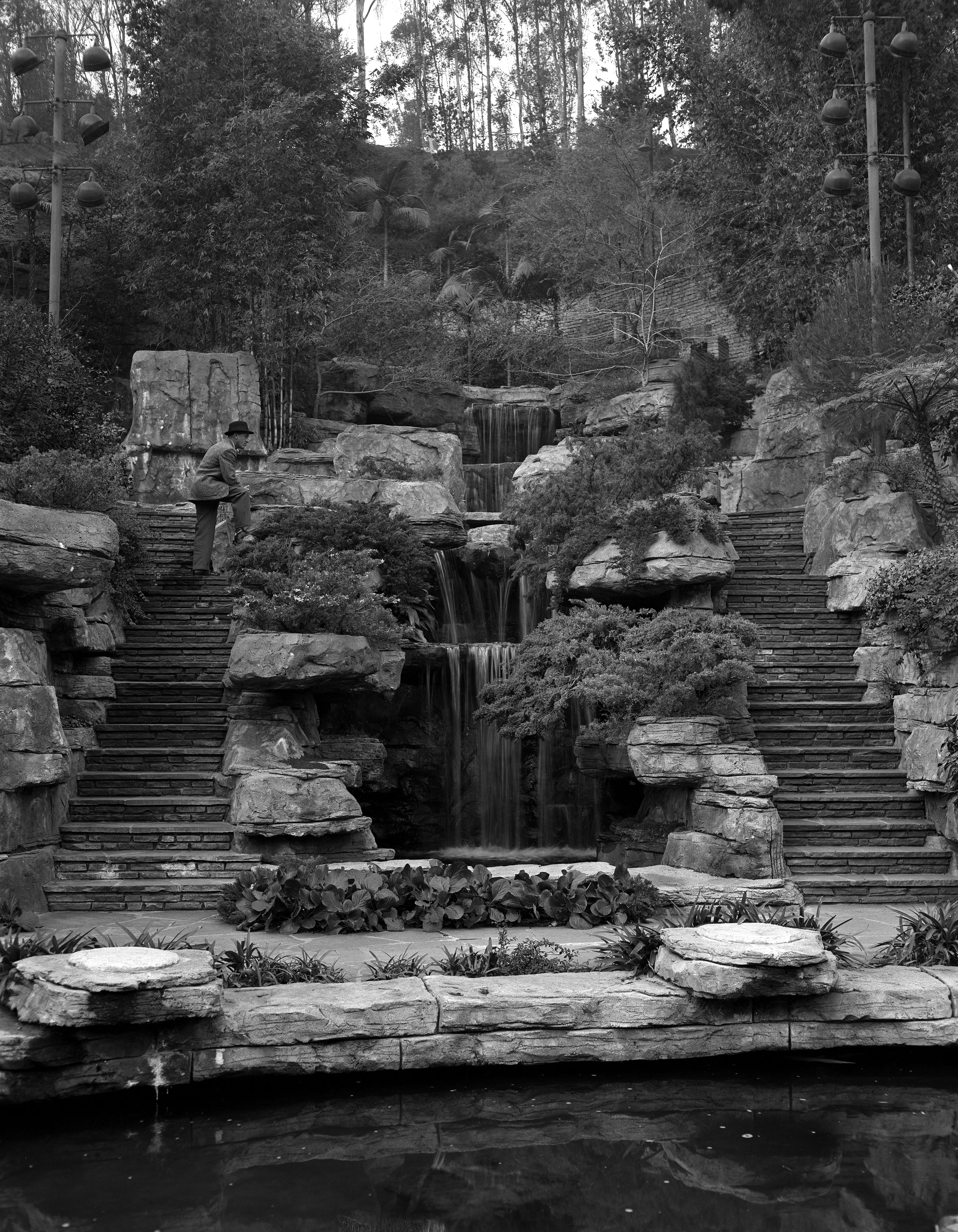
Waterfall and rock garden behind the former Police Academy, 1956

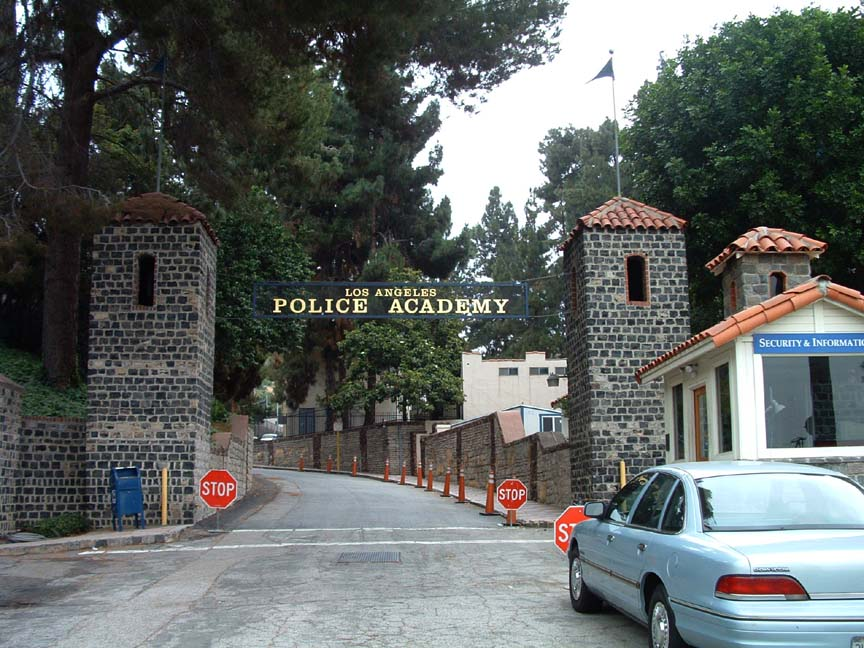
Los Angeles Police Academy, 2005

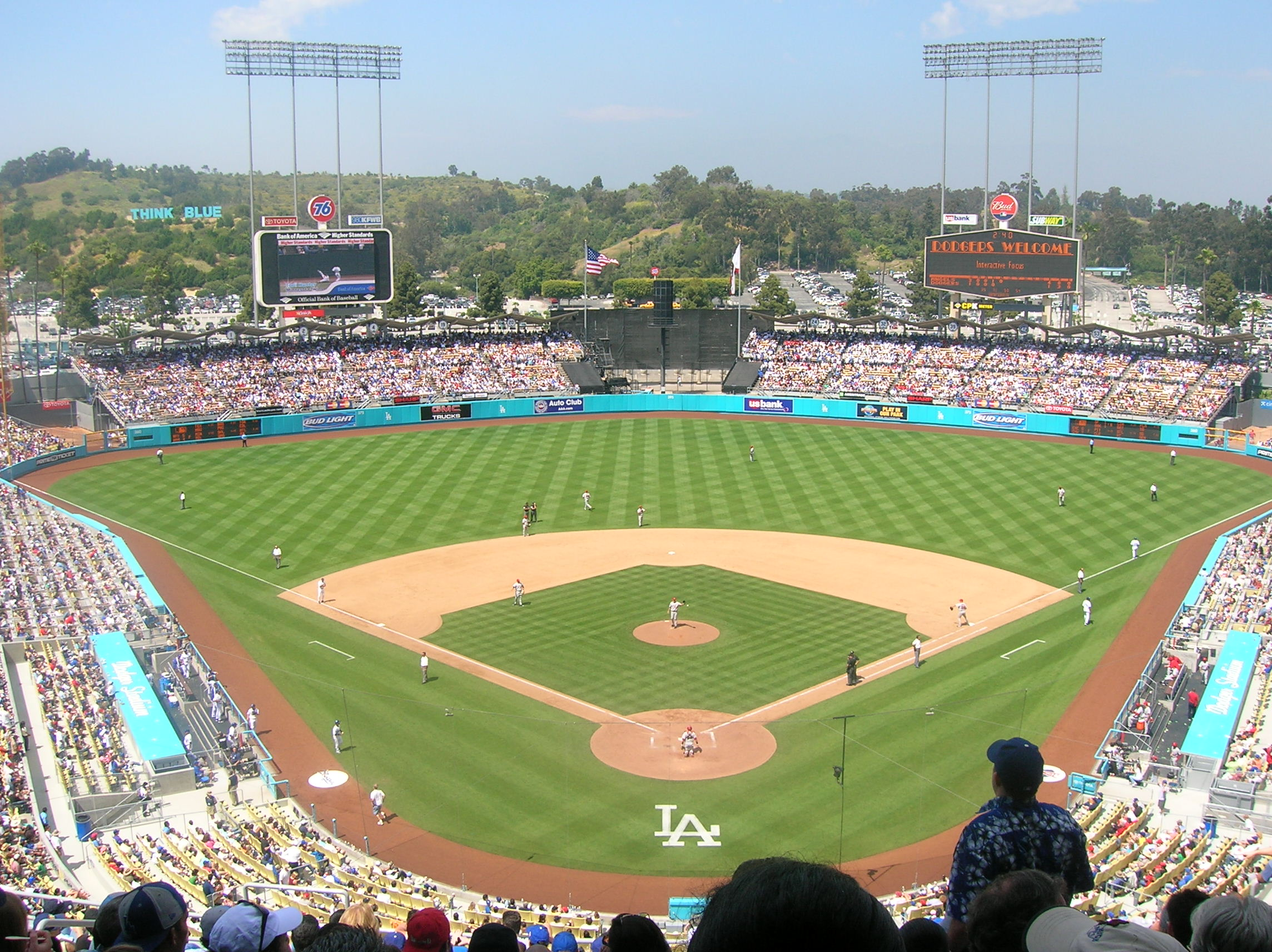
Dodger Stadium, 2007

The 2000 U.S. census of the Elysian Park neighborhood counted 2,530 residents in its 1.65 square miles, which includes all the city park land as well as Dodger Stadium—an average of 1,538 people per square mile, one of the lowest population densities in Los Angeles county. In 2008 the city estimated that the population had increased to 2,659. The median age for residents was 31, about average for Los Angeles; the percentage of residents aged 11 to 18 were among the county's highest.

The neighborhood was moderately ethnically diverse. The breakdown was Latinos, 47.6%; Asians, 43.4%; whites, 3.1%; blacks, 2.1%, and others, 3.7%. China (32.3%) and Mexico (27.3%) were the most common places of birth for the 54.4% of the residents who were born abroad, a high figure compared to rest of the city.

The median yearly household income in 2008 dollars was $28,263, low for Los Angeles; a high percentage of households had an income of $20,000 or less. The average household size of 3.1 people was high for the city of Los Angeles. Renters occupied 81.9% of the housing stock, and house- or apartment owners 18.1%.

== Education ==
Thirteen percent of the neighborhood residents aged 25 and older had earned a four-year degree by 2000, an average figure for the city.

The schools operating within the Elysian Park neighborhood borders are:

- Cathedral High School, private, 1253 Bishops Road. It was founded by Archbishop John Joseph Cantwell as the first Los Angeles Archdiocesan high school for boys in fall 1925. The Christian Brothers have operated the school since its opening. It was designated Los Angeles Historic-Cultural Monument number 281 in 1984.
- Solano Avenue Elementary School, LAUSD, 615 Solano Avenue. In 1955, the school, which then had 230 pupils, was honored as one of the 221 schools given a California Distinguished School award. The Los Angeles Times reported that:

At Solano Avenue Elementary School, things are done right. Parents chip in, teachers stick around for years, children learn, and the surrounding community claims it for their own. The campus is a thing of pride-no graffiti or trash problems here.

Principal John Stoll noted that nearly half the children began school speaking limited English, having been raised in Spanish or Cantonese-speaking homes. The school was "adopted" by the Los Angeles Dodgers in 1980, and it was known for sending the student choir to Dodger Stadium to sing the National Anthem before a ballgame. It is a Solano tradition to hold culmination ceremonies at Dodger Stadium. The class of 2001, however, did not have this privilege.

== Park ==
The park is one of largest in Los Angeles at 600 acres (2.4 km^{2}). It is also the city's oldest park, founded in 1886 by the Elysian Park Enabling Ordinance. It hosted shooting as well as the shooting part of the modern pentathlon event for the 1932 Summer Olympics. In 1964, the Citizens Committee to Save Elysian Park was founded to prevent the City of Los Angeles from constructing the Municipal Convention Center on 62 acres (250,000 m^{2}) of park land.

In 1968, it hosted a hippie "Love-in".

The land that is now the site of Dodger Stadium was once known as Chavez Ravine, and was home to a large Mexican-American community. In 1949, the Los Angeles Housing Authority declared the neighborhood “under-utilized.” By 1960, residents had been removed and their homes bulldozed.

== Figueroa Street Tunnels ==
The Figueroa Street Tunnels take northbound State Route 110 (the Pasadena Freeway) through the park.

== Solano Canyon ==
Solano Canyon is a canyon within Elysian Park and also the name of a residential district at the southern extremity of the Elysian Park neighborhood, directly north of the Los Angeles State Historic Park. The district is bisected near its southern tip by the Arroyo Seco Parkway, and it shares a border with Chinatown.

Solano Canyon was also an old name for a ravine in the Hollywood Hills that was later named Runyon Canyon.

== See also ==
- Elysian Park Fault, an earthquake-producing fault named after the park
- Ned R. Healy, L.A. City Council member (1943–44) and member of Congress (1945–47), opposed slant oil drilling under the park
- List of districts and neighborhoods of Los Angeles
- List of parks in Los Angeles
