= Julio Castro (sport shooter) =

Spanish sports shooter

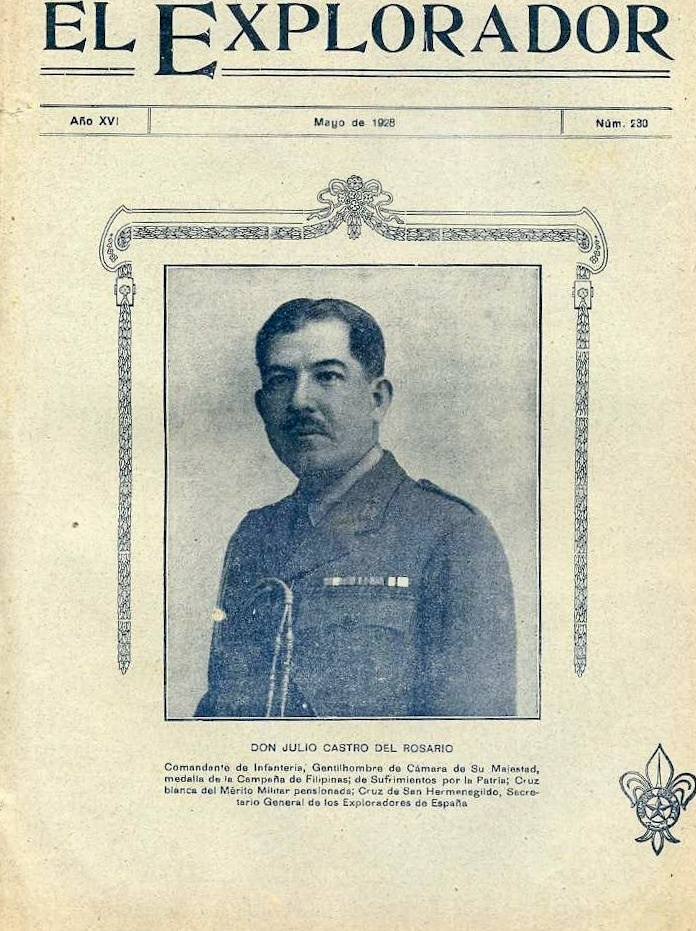
- Image of Mr. Julio Castro del Rosario, general secretary of Explorers of Spain. El Explorador Magazine, No. 230, May 1928

Personal information
- Born: 27 December 1879 Celen, Philippines

Sport
- Sport: Sports shooting

Julio Castro (born 27 December 1879, date of death unknown) was a Spanish sports shooter. He competed in the 50 m rifle, prone event at the 1932 Summer Olympics. He was the flag bearer for Spain in the opening ceremony of the 1932 Summer Olympics.
