= Art competitions at the 1932 Summer Olympics =

Art competitions at the Games of the X Olympiad
- Art competitions pictogram
- Venue: Los Angeles Museum of History, Science and Art
- Dates: 30 July – 14 August 1932
- No. of events: 9

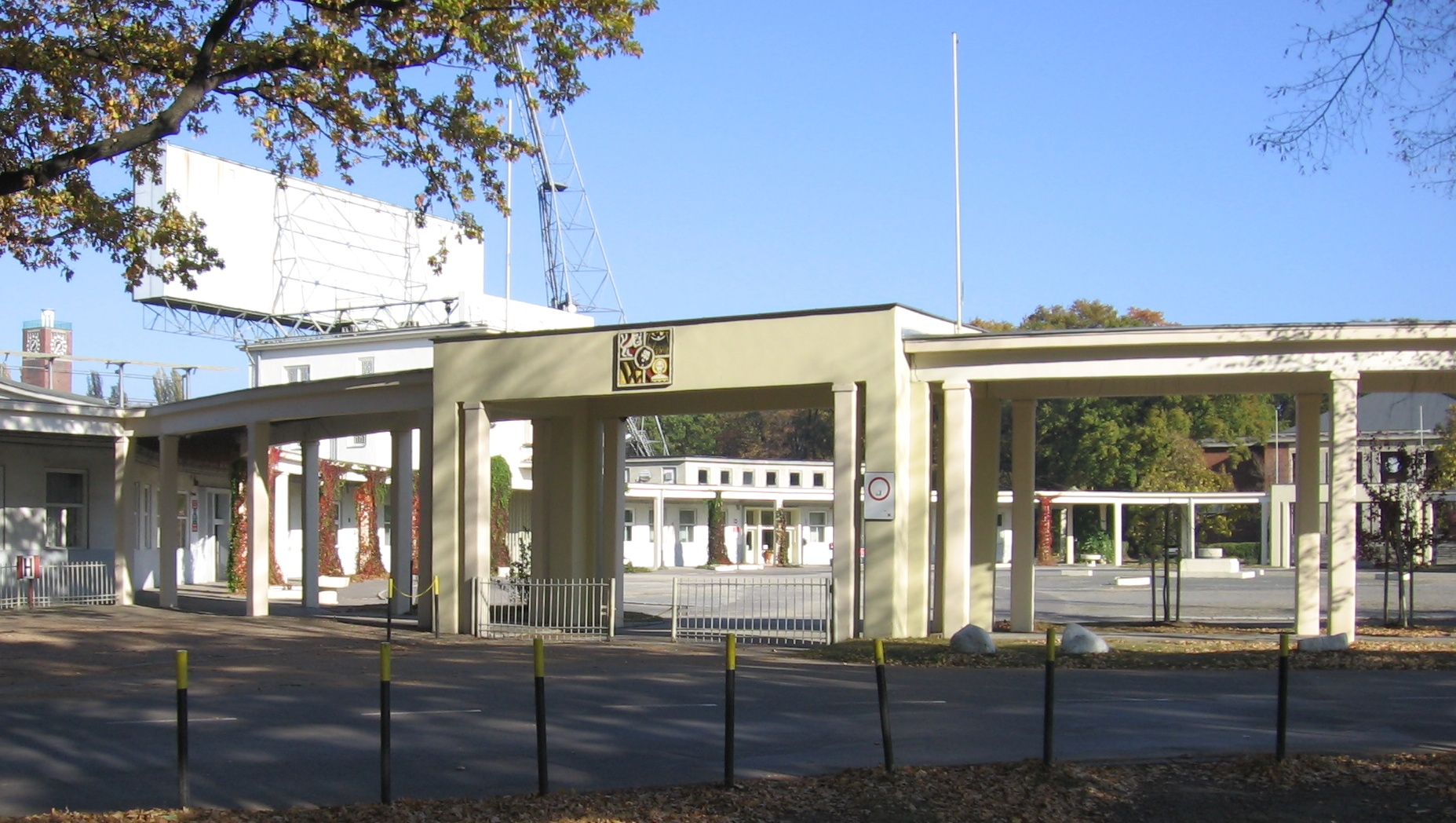
Richard Konwiarz won the bronze medal for the design of the Schlesierkampfbahn in Breslau.

Art competitions were held as part of the 1932 Summer Olympics in Los Angeles, United States. Medals were awarded in five categories (architecture, literature, music, painting, and sculpture), for works inspired by sport-related themes.

Art competitions were part of the Olympic program from 1912 to 1948, but were discontinued due to concerns about amateurism and professionalism. Since 1952, a non-competitive art and cultural festival has been associated with each game.

== Architecture ==
Category	Gold	Silver	Bronze
Architectural design	Gustave Saacké, Pierre Montenot, Pierre Bailly (FRA); Design for a "Cirque pour Toros"	John Russell Pope (USA); Design for the Payne Whitney Gymnasium, New Haven, Connecticut	Richard Konwiarz (GER); Design for a "Schlesierkampfbahn" in the Sport Park of Breslau
Town planning	John Hughes (GBR); Design for a Sports and Recreation Centre with Stadium, for the City of Liverpool	Jens Klemmensen (DEN); Design for a Stadium and Public Park	André Verbeke (BEL); Design for a "Marathon Park"

== Literature ==
Category	Gold	Silver	Bronze
Literature	Paul Bauer (GER) "Am Kangehenzonga"	Josef Petersen (DEN) "The Argonauts"	none awarded

== Music ==
Category	Gold	Silver	Bronze
Music	none awarded	Josef Suk (TCH) "Into a New Life" symphonic march	none awarded

== Painting ==
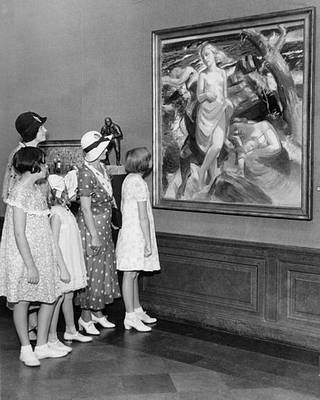
Los Angeles, 1932: visitors admiring "At the Seaside of Arild" by David Wallin (1876–1957), of Sweden.

Category	Gold	Silver	Bronze
Paintings	David Wallin (SWE) "At the Seaside of Arild"	Ruth Miller (USA) "Struggle"	none awarded
Watercolors and drawings	Lee Blair (USA) "Rodeo"	Percy Crosby (USA) "Jackknife"	Gerhard Westermann (NED) "Horseman"
Graphic arts	Joseph Golinkin (USA) "Leg Scissors"	Janina Konarska (POL) "Stadium"	Joachim Karsch (GER) "Stabwechsel"

== Sculpture ==
Category	Gold	Silver	Bronze
Statues	Mahonri Young (USA) "The Knockdown"	Miltiades Manno (HUN) "Wrestling"	Jakub Obrovský (TCH) "Odysseus"
Medals and reliefs	Józef Klukowski (POL) "Sport Sculpture II"	Frederick MacMonnies (USA) "Lindbergh Medal"	R. Tait McKenzie (CAN) "Shield of the Athletes"

== Medal table ==
At the time, medals were awarded to these artists, but art competitions are no longer regarded as official Olympic events by the International Olympic Committee (IOC). These events do not appear in the IOC medal database, and these totals are not included in the IOC's medal table for the 1932 Games.

Rank	Nation	Gold	Silver	Bronze	Total
1	United States (USA)	3	4	0	7
2	Poland (POL)	1	1	0	2
3	Germany (GER)	1	0	2	3
4	France (FRA)	1	0	0	1
4	Great Britain (GBR)	1	0	0	1
4	Sweden (SWE)	1	0	0	1
7	Denmark (DEN)	0	2	0	2
8	Czechoslovakia (TCH)	0	1	1	2
9	Hungary (HUN)	0	1	0	1
10	Belgium (BEL)	0	0	1	1
10	Canada (CAN)	0	0	1	1
10	Netherlands (NED)	0	0	1	1
Totals (12 entries)		8	9	6	23

== Events summary ==
=== Architecture ===
Designs for Town Planning

The following architects took part:

Rank	Name	Country
1	John Hughes	Great Britain
2	Jens Hovmøller Klemmensen	Denmark
3	André Verbeke	Belgium
AC	Louis Stynen	Belgium
AC	Alois Dryák	Czechoslovakia
AC	Hermann Alker	Germany
AC	Martin Westerberg	Sweden
AC	Shirley Baker	United States
AC	John Branner	United States
AC	Dan Ormsbee	United States

Architectural Designs

The following architects took part:

Rank	Name	Country
1	Gustave Saacké, Pierre Bailly, Pierre Montenot	France
2	John Russell Pope	United States
3	Richard Konwiarz	Germany

Further entries

The following architects took part:

Name	Country
Hugo Gorge	Austria
Alfred Keller	Austria
Richard Pfob	Austria
Hermann Tamussino	Austria
Fritz De Boever	Belgium
Deryck	Belgium
Raphaël Van Dorpe	Belgium
Frans Laporta	Belgium
Ferdinand Balcárek	Czechoslovakia
Karel Kopp	Czechoslovakia
Niels Rohweder	Denmark
Gustave Saacké	France
Pierre Bailly	France
Pierre Montenot	France
Ernst Balser	Germany
Max Bromme	Germany

Name	Country
Walter Gropius	Germany
Ernst Gerlach	Germany
Wilhelm Hübotter	Germany
Richard Konwiarz	Germany
Otto Ernst Schweizer	Germany
Jan Wils	Netherlands
Alfréd Hajós	Hungary
Pál Vágó	Hungary
Szabolcs Horváth	Hungary
Ivo Battelli	Italy
Masaichi Kobayashi	Japan
Kenji Ishihara	Japan
Edgar Norwerth	Poland
Gustaf Birch-Lindgren	Sweden
Robert Andrews	United States
Maurice Biscoe	United States

Name	Country
Howland Jones	United States
John Whitmore	United States
Berton Crandall	United States
Gavin Hadden	United States
Holabird & Root	United States
William Frenaye	United States
Edwin Howard	United States
Charles Klauder	United States
Donald Parkinson	United States
John Parkinson	United States
Richard Neutra	United States
Alfred Poor	United States
Robert Rodgers	United States
Howard Smith	United States
Jens Larson	United States

=== Literature ===
The following writers took part:

Rank	Name	Country
1	Paul Bauer	Germany
2	Josef Petersen	Denmark
3	Not awarded	
AC	Avery Brundage	United States
AC	Marinus Børup	Denmark
AC	Anders Holm	Denmark
AC	Alfred Meyer	Germany
AC	August Hermann Zeiz	Germany
AC	Jan Feith	Netherlands
AC	Jan Kan	Netherlands
AC	György Doros	Hungary
AC	Miklós Hodászy	Hungary
AC	József Kucharik	Hungary
AC	Ottó Misángyi	Hungary
AC	Emil Neidenbach	Hungary
AC	Bruno Roghi	Italy
AC	Anders Lundin	Sweden
AC	Miroslav Bedřich Böhnel	Czechoslovakia
AC	Jack Sterrett	United States

=== Music ===
The following composers took part:

Rank	Name	Country
1	Not awarded	
2	Josef Suk	Czechoslovakia
3	Not awarded	
AC	Emirto de Lima	Colombia
AC	Abelardo Cuevas	Cuba
AC	Lenva	Cuba
AC	Rogelio Pazquez	Cuba
AC	Hakon Børresen	Denmark
AC	Felix Labunski	France
AC	Rudolf Bode	Germany
AC	Wilhelm Guttmann	Germany
AC	Hermann Heiß	Germany
AC	Alphonse Henriquez	Haiti
AC	Coenraad Lodewijk Walther Boer	Netherlands
AC	Ernests Elks-Elksnītis	Latvia

Rank	Name	Country
AC	Marc-César Scotto	Monaco
AC	Johs Elvestad	Norway
AC	Michał Kondracki	Poland
AC	Józef Krudowski	Poland
AC	Armando Mencía	Switzerland
AC	Johanna Beyer	United States
AC	Georges Couvreur	United States
AC	Giovanni Del Colle	United States
AC	Lorraine Eckardt	United States
AC	Charles Edson	United States
AC	Charles Fletcher	United States
AC	Mabel Fossler	United States
AC	J. B. Gaskell	United States
AC	Gerardo Iasilli	United States
AC	Nana King	United States

Rank	Name	Country
AC	Jessica Lewis	United States
AC	Marjorie Lewis	United States
AC	Pearl Conklin	United States
AC	Michael Merecki	United States
AC	Floyd Morgenstern	United States
AC	Grace Nelson	United States
AC	Fred Pacheco	United States
AC	Achille Porcasi	United States
AC	Charles Ridgway	United States
AC	Hugo Scherzer	United States
AC	Elise Swanson	United States
AC	Pavel Bořkovec	Czechoslovakia
AC	Ladislav Kohout	Czechoslovakia
AC	Jaroslav Křička	Czechoslovakia

=== Painting ===
Drawings and water colours

The following painters took part:

Rank	Name	Country
1	Lee Blair	United States
2	Percy Crosby	United States
3	Gerard Westermann	Netherlands
AC	Marcel Prévost	Belgium
AC	Acee Blue Eagle	United States
AC	Gösta von Hennigs	Sweden
AC	Jean Jacoby	Luxembourg

Graphic arts

The following painters took part:

Rank	Name	Country
1	Joseph Webster Golinkin	United States
2	Janina Konarska-Słonimska	Poland
3	Joachim Karsch	Germany
AC	Armin Hansen	United States
AC	Haruyoshi Nagae	Japan
AC	Gerald Spencer Pryse	Great Britain
AC	Lewis Daniel	United States

Paintings

The following painters took part:

Rank	Name	Country
1	David Wallin	Sweden
2	Ruth Miller	United States
3	Not awarded	
AC	Antonia Matos	Guatemala
AC	Charles Pears	Great Britain
AC	George Hill	United States
AC	Michał Bylina	Poland
AC	Wacław Borowski	Poland

Unknown event

The following painters took part:

Name	Country
Adrienne Jouclard	France
Agnes Canta	Netherlands
Anna Airy	Great Britain
Beata Beach	United States
Charlotte Berend-Corinth	Germany
Edith Magonigle	United States
Felicie Howell	United States
Frances J. Kelly	Ireland
Helen Wills	United States
Hélène Dufau	France
Hélène Gérard	Belgium
Hermine David	France
Hilda Roberts	Ireland
Isabel Bishop	United States
Jadwiga Hładki	Poland
Jadwiga Umińska	Poland
Kathryn Leighton	United States
Laura Knight	Great Britain
Leonia Nadelman	Poland
Lilian Westcott Hale	United States
Louise Nimmo	United States
Margaret Fitzhugh Browne	United States
Marja Obrębska	Poland
Marjorie Phillips	United States
Mary Wesselhoeft	United States
Polly Hill	United States
Ruth Peabody	United States
Suzanne Christophe	Belgium
Sybilla Mittell Weber	United States
Verena Ruegg	United States
Eleanor Modrakowska	United States
Peter Colfs	Belgium
Joseph Conrardy	Belgium
Dumortier	Belgium
Wauters	Belgium
André Dunoyer de Segonzac	France
Anton van Anrooy	Great Britain
Alfred Munnings	Great Britain
Archibald Hartrick	Great Britain
Acke Åslund	Sweden
Ado Baltus	Belgium
Albert Matignon	France
Alexander Tiranoff	United States
Alfred Poor	United States
Andreas Friis	Denmark
Andrzej Stypiński	Poland
Anshelm Schultzberg	Sweden
Anton Räderscheidt	Germany
Antonín Landa	Czechoslovakia
Arnold Friedman	United States
Arnold Wiltz	United States
Arthur Burgess	Great Britain
Arthur Freedlander	United States
Arthur Wellmann	Germany
Axel Sjöberg	Sweden
Benjamin Brown	United States
Bruno Liljefors	Sweden
Cornelis Kloos	Netherlands
Cecil Ross Burnett	Great Britain
Cornelis Mension	Netherlands
Chris van der Hoef	Netherlands
Carl Sprinchorn	United States
Carlo Testi	Italy
Charles Cundall	Great Britain
Charles Lamb	Ireland
Charles Payne	Great Britain
Charles Simpson	Great Britain
Charles Morris Young	United States
Charles Paul Gruppé	United States
Chikatoshi Enomoto	Japan
Corneille Lentz	Luxembourg
Kees van Dongen	France
Cuthbert Orde	Great Britain
David Ghilchik	Great Britain
Nelly Degouy	Belgium
Désiré Acket	Belgium
Donald Wood	Great Britain
Duncan Gleason	United States
Irving Couse	United States
Earl Purdy	United States
Eben Comins	United States
Edgar Seligman	Great Britain
Edith Horle	United States
Edmund Bartłomiejczyk	Poland
Édouard Fraisse	France
Edward Borein	United States
Edward Manteuffel	Poland
Hide Kawanishi	Japan
Eigil Schwab	Sweden
Erich Heckel	Germany
Erik Raadal	Denmark
Ernest Fiene	United States
Ernest Moore	Great Britain
Ernest Baker	United States
Ernst Böhm	Germany
Ernst Hansen	Denmark
Eugène Pechaubes	France
Eugeniusz Geppert	Poland
Francis Chapin	United States
Francis Hodge	Great Britain
Frank Benson	United States
Frank Mason	Great Britain
František Hoplíček	Czechoslovakia
Frederick Wight	United States

Name	Country
Friedrich Baur	Latvia
Fritz Göhring	Germany
Fritz Heinsheimer	Germany
Denholm Armour	Great Britain
Howard K. Elcock	Great Britain
Georg Lagerstedt	Sweden
George Collie	Ireland
Georg Gelbke	Germany
George Gibbs	United States
George Jacobs	United States
George Luks	United States
George Sheringham	Great Britain
Georges Baltus	Belgium
Georges Dantu	France
Gerald Foster	United States
Gerardo Dottori	Italy
Gert Wollheim	Germany
Gilbert Holiday	Great Britain
Gordon Stevenson	United States
Guy Pène du Bois	United States
György Kürthy	Hungary
Hans Pape	Germany
Harald Hansen	Denmark
Harold Shurtleff	United States
Harry Watson	Great Britain
Hayley Lever	United States
Heizo Kanayama	Japan
Helmer Osslund	Sweden
Henri Pinguenet	France
Henri Royer	France
Henri Zo	France
Henry Poore	United States
Herman Trunk	United States
Hermann Keimel	Germany
Howard Everett Smith	United States
Hugo Ballin	United States
Hugo Nicholson	United States
Hugo Siegmüller	Czechoslovakia
Hunt Diederich	United States
Isaac Grünewald	Sweden
Isaac Israëls	Netherlands
Isamu Toyofuji	Japan
Alfred Duriau	Belgium
Joachim Hellgrewe	Germany
Jānis Tīdemanis	Belgium
Humbert Craig	Ireland
Mortimer Lichtenauer	United States
Julius Engelhard	Germany
Jack Yeats	Ireland
James Chapin	United States
James Newell	United States
James Quinn	Australia
Jay Maddox	United States
Jean Jacoby	Luxembourg
Jean MacLane	United States
Jeremi Kubicki	Poland
Jerzy Skolimowski	Poland
Johan Bull	United States
Johannes Boehland	Germany
Jos Lussenburg	Netherlands
John W. Dunn	United States
John Koopman	United States
John Lavery	Great Britain
John MacGilchrist	United States
John Rich	United States
John Taylor Arms	United States
Józef Korolkiewicz	Poland
Jos Seckel	Netherlands
Julius Bloch	United States
Julius Paulsen	Denmark
Junpei Eto	Japan
Karl Hahn	Germany
Katsundo Kosaka	Japan
Kees Roovers	Netherlands
Kerr Eby	United States
Yoshie Nakada	Japan
Hitoshi Ikebe	Japan
Knud Merrild	Denmark
Konrad Srzednicki	Poland
Konstantīns Visotskis	Latvia
Koshiro Onchi	Japan
Kotaro Ikeda	Japan
Kojin Kozu	Japan
Kunzo Minami	Japan
Ludwig Waldschmidt	Germany
Leo Whelan	Ireland
Leonardo Borgese	Italy
Levon West	United States
Lewis Baumer	Great Britain
Lionel Edwards	Great Britain
Louis Denis-Valvérane	France
Louis Hechenbleikner	United States
Louis Malespina	France
Lucien Jonas	France
Ludvík Vacátko	Czechoslovakia
Ludwig Angerer	Germany
Ludwig Hohlwein	Germany
Menno van Meeteren Brouwer	Netherlands
Mahonri Mackintosh Young	United States
Mario Beltrami	Italy
Maurice Ehlinger	France
Max Clarenbach	Germany
Max Švabinský	Czechoslovakia
Michał Boruciński	Poland

Name	Country
Miltiades Manno	Hungary
Misai Kosugi	Japan
Oliver Milburn	Canada
Oscar Hullgren	Sweden
Oskar Nerlinger	Germany
Otto Dill	Germany
Ottorino Mancioli	Italy
Piet van der Hem	Netherlands
P. A. Hay	Great Britain
Paul Heimen	Belgium
Paul Morchain	France
Pál Szűcs	Hungary
Philip de László	Great Britain
Philip Kran Paval	Denmark
Philippe Le Molt	France
Pierre Montezin	France
Pierre Nuyttens	United States
Rafał Malczewski	Poland
Randall Davey	United States
Raoul du Gardier	France
René Xavier Prinet	France
Reynolds Beal	United States
Richard Bishop	United States
Richard Earle	United States
Richard Lahey	United States
Róbert Byssz	Hungary
Robert Fernier	France
Roger Nivelt	France
Roland Clark	United States
Ronald Gray	Great Britain
Ryusei Furukawa	Japan
Ryokichi Sakai	Japan
Sakuichi Fukazawa	Japan
Samuel Theobald	United States
Seán O'Sullivan	Ireland
Senpan Maekawa	Japan
Shiko Munakata	Japan
Shintaro Takeda	Japan
Shogo Taguchi	Japan
Shuzo Kanda	Japan
Stefan Osiecki	Poland
Chosei Kawakami	Japan
Susumu Yamaguchi	Japan
Thomas Dugdale	Great Britain
Tadeusz Gronowski	Poland
Takamura Kodama	Japan
Tensen Ogyu	Japan
Tom Purvis	Great Britain
Tomotari Sakurai	Japan
Toru Arai	Japan
Ulrich Hübner	Germany
Vaughn Flannery	United States
Hendrika Schaap-van der Pek	Netherlands
Herbert Dunton	United States
Walt Speck	United States
Walther Klemm	Germany
Walther Kohlhase	Germany
Wayman Adams	United States
Wharton Esherick	United States
Wiktor Podoski	Poland
Wilhelm Hölter	Germany
Corry Gallas	Netherlands
William Byrne	United States
William Hays	United States
William Littlefield	United States
William McNulty	United States
William Schulhoff	United States
Heath Robinson	Great Britain
Willi Baumeister	Germany
Willy Jaeckel	Germany
Willy Sluiter	Netherlands
Yasuo Kuniyoshi	United States
Yngve Soderberg	United States
Yoshitaro Sato	Japan
Zbigniew Czech	Poland
Philip Hale	United States
John Johansen	United States
Erich Büttner	Germany
George Bellows	United States
Glenn Coleman	United States
Thomas Eakins	United States
Pop Hart	United States
Gari Melchers	United States
Charles Sheeler Jr.	United States
Eugene Speicher	United States
Edmund Tarbell	United States
Sears Gallagher	United States
Anne Goldthwaite	United States
Alexander Kruse	United States
Reginald Marsh	United States
Rodney Thomson	United States
Gerald Spencer Pryse	Great Britain
Gerard Westermann	Netherlands
Jaap Weyand	Netherlands
Jan Wils	Netherlands
Janina Konarska-Słonimska	Poland
Gösta von Hennigs	Sweden
David Wallin	Sweden
Lee Blair	United States
Joseph Webster Golinkin	United States
Winslow Homer	United States
Acee Blue Eagle	United States
Percy Crosby	United States
Lewis Daniel	United States

=== Sculpture ===
Medals and Reliefs

The following sculptors took part:

Rank	Name	Country
1	Józef Klukowski	Poland
2	Frederick MacMonnies	United States
3	Tait McKenzie	Canada

Statues

The following sculptors took part:

Rank	Name	Country
1	Mahonri Mackintosh Young	United States
2	Miltiades Manno	Hungary
3	Jakub Obrovský	Czechoslovakia
AC	Antoni Kenar	Poland
AC	Carl Fagerberg	Sweden
AC	Dudley Talcott	United States
AC	Ercole Drei	Italy
AC	Gerhard Henning	Denmark
AC	Hunt Diederich	United States
AC	Rudolf Belling	Germany

Unknown event

The following sculptors took part:

Name	Country
Suzanne Muzanne	France
Alice Nordin	Sweden
Anna Van Nuffel	Belgium
Anne Marie Carl-Nielsen	Denmark
Beatrice Fenton	United States
Jean-Elie Vézien	France
Elizabeth Mason	United States
Ella Buchanan	United States
Grace Talbot	United States
Hanuš Folkmann	Czechoslovakia
Hughlette Wheeler	United States
Kathleen Ingels	United States
Laura Gardin Fraser	United States
Maud von Rosen-Engberg	Sweden
Olga Niewska	Poland
Olda Žák	Czechoslovakia
Jess Lawson Peacey	Great Britain
Renée Sintenis	Germany
Suzanne Silvercruys Farnam	Belgium
Daemers	Belgium
Georges Malissard	France
Theodor Pilartz	Germany
Abel Lafleur	France
Adam Antes	Germany
Alfons Karny	Poland
Amory Simons	United States
Angelo Bertolazzi	Italy
Anton Endstorfer	Austria
Antonín Odehnal	Czechoslovakia
Arthur Dominique	Belgium
Arvid Källström	Sweden
Arvid Knöppel	Sweden
Betsy Muus	Belgium
Boris Blai	United States
Chris van der Hoef	Netherlands
Carl Eldh	Sweden
Carl Elmberg	Sweden
Carl Hallsthammar	United States
Chaim Gross	United States
Conrad Carlman	Sweden
Constantin Starck	Germany
David Evans	Great Britain
Édouard Fraisse	France
Edward Hald	Sweden
Edwin Grienauer	Austria
Edwin Everett Codman	United States
Eiichi Kawasaki	Japan

Name	Country
Einar Utzon-Frank	Denmark
Tolles Chamberlin	United States
Franciszek Masiak	Poland
Franciszek Strynkiewicz	Poland
François Clémencin	France
Frank Ingels	United States
Frank Jirouch	United States
Gaston d'Illiers	France
Gerhard Marcks	Germany
Gösta Carell	Sweden
Graham Douglas	United States
Hans Schwegerle	Germany
Henri Raphaël Moncassin	France
Henry Lion	United States
Herbert Garbe	Germany
Hermon Atkins MacNeil	United States
Hugo Liisberg	Denmark
Jan Kavan	Czechoslovakia
Jessie Herron	United States
John Lundqvist	Sweden
Josef Bock	Austria
Josef Drahoňovský	Czechoslovakia
Josef Mařatka	Czechoslovakia
Josef Thorak	Austria
Josef Wackerle	Germany
George Kratina	United States
Karel Lidický	Czechoslovakia
Karl Skoog	United States
Karol Tchorek	Poland
Kooyu Fujii	Japan
Kyushichi Miyajima	Japan
Leonard Craske	United States
Louis Botinelly	France
Louis Malespina	France
Marcel Mérignargues	France
Marian Brackenridge	United States
Marian Gobius	Netherlands
Max Laeuger	Germany
Merrell Gage	United States
Michel Jungblut	Luxembourg
Naoya Takei	Japan
Oskar Gloeckler	Germany
Oskar Thiede	Austria
Otto Hofner	Austria
Otto Placzek	Germany
Otto Schnitzer	Germany
Paul Gruson	Germany

Name	Country
Paul Moreau-Vauthier	France
Pierre Toulgouat	France
René Daemen	Belgium
Richard Demeyer	Belgium
Roger Noble Burnham	United States
Rudolf Bosselt	Germany
Saburo Hamada	Japan
Seibo Kitamura	Japan
Sigurd Forchhammer	Denmark
Simon Gate	Sweden
Stig Blomberg	Sweden
Terzo Polazzo	Italy
Theodor von Gosen	Germany
Thyra Boldsen	Denmark
Toon Dupuis	Netherlands
Tore Strindberg	Sweden
Victor Demanet	Belgium
Vicke Lindstrand	Sweden
Waldemar Raemisch	Germany
Walker Hancock	United States
Warren Wheelock	United States
William Zorach	United States
Wojciech Jastrzębowski	Poland
Yoshioki Hasegawa	Japan
Yuhachi Ikeda	Japan
Jitsuzo Hinago	Japan
Valère De Moer	Belgium
Philip Sears	United States
Tait McKenzie	Canada
Jakub Obrovský	Czechoslovakia
Gerhard Henning	Denmark
Miltiades Manno	Hungary
Józef Klukowski	Poland
Antoni Kenar	Poland
Hunt Diederich	United States
Dudley Talcott	United States
Mahonri Mackintosh Young	United States
Abastenia St. Leger Eberle	United States
Harriet Frishmuth	United States
Henry Hering	United States
Charles Keck	United States
Julio Kilenyi	United States
Paul Manship	United States
Edward McCartan	United States
Charles Niehaus	United States
Brenda Putnam	United States

=== Unknown event ===
The following artists also took part, but the exact event is unknown:

Name	Country
Juan Gavazzo	Argentina
José Orozco	Mexico
Ángel Zárraga	Mexico
Julio Berrocal	Peru
Romano Espinoza	Peru
Elie Cristo-Loveanu	Romania
Pedro de Matheu	El Salvador
Pedro Figari	Uruguay
Alberto Egea	Venezuela
Maia Wiig-Hansen	Norway
Hans Swansee	Switzerland
Ramón de Zubiaurre	Spain
Kiril Shivarov	Bulgaria
Georgi Karakashev	Bulgaria
Mehmet Saıp	Turkey

== Sources ==
- The Games of the Xth Olympiad Los Angeles 1932 (PDF). Xth Olympiade Committee of the Games of Los Angeles, U.S.A. 1932. 1933. pp. 748–765. Archived from the original (PDF) on 10 April 2008.
- Wagner, Juergen. "Olympic Art Competition 1932". Olympic Games Museum. Archived from the original on 1 May 2008.
- Kramer, Bernhard (May 2004). "In Search of the Lost Champions of the Olympic Art Contests" (PDF). Journal of Olympic History. 12 (2): 29–34. Archived (PDF) from the original on 10 April 2008.
