= Elvestad (surname) =

Elvestad is a Norwegian surname. Notable people with the surname include:

- Henrik Elvestad (born 1973), Norwegian actor and comedian
- Johs Elvestad (1899–1989), Norwegian composer
- Sven Elvestad (1884–1934), Norwegian journalist and author
