= Martin Westerberg =

Swedish architect

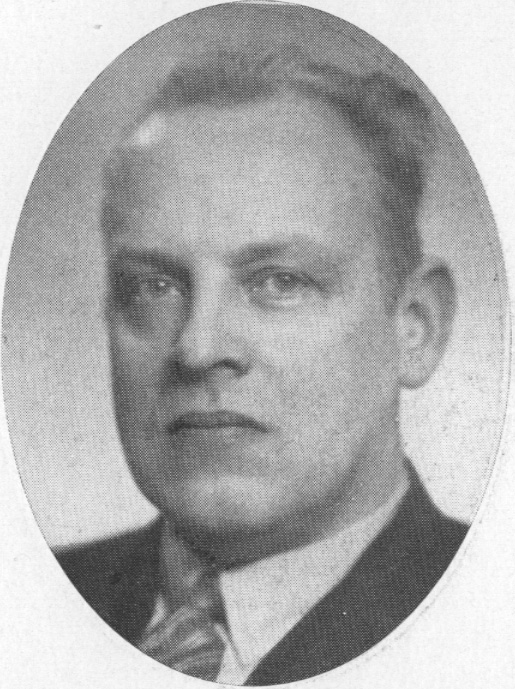
- Born: 13 May 1892; Stockholm, Sweden
- Died: 3 October 1963 (aged 71); Stockholm, Sweden
- Occupation: Architect

Martin Westerberg (13 May 1892 – 3 October 1963) was a Swedish architect. His work was part of the architecture event in the art competition at the 1932 Summer Olympics.
