= Pál Szűcs =

Hungarian painter

- Born: 26 March 1906; Budapest, Austria-Hungary
- Died: 15 January 1969 (aged 62); Budapest, Hungary
- Occupation: Painter

Pál Szűcs (26 March 1906 – 15 January 1969) was a Hungarian painter. His work was part of the painting event in the art competition at the 1932 Summer Olympics.
