= Armando Mencía =

Swiss composer (1903–?)

- Born: 22 April 1903; Havana, Cuba
- Occupation: Composer

Armando Mencía (born 22 April 1903 – ?) was a Swiss composer. His work was part of the music event in the art competition at the 1932 Summer Olympics.
