= Corry Gallas =

Dutch painter

- Born: 31 January 1885; Brielle, Netherlands
- Died: 18 February 1967 (aged 82); The Hague, Netherlands
- Occupation: Painter

Cornelia Elisabeth Gallas (31 January 1885 – 18 February 1967), commonly known as Corry or Corrie, was a Dutch painter. Her work was part of the painting event in the art competition at the 1932 Summer Olympics. Gallas's work has been exhibited at the Stedelijk Museum Amsterdam.
