= Jessie Herron =

American sculptor

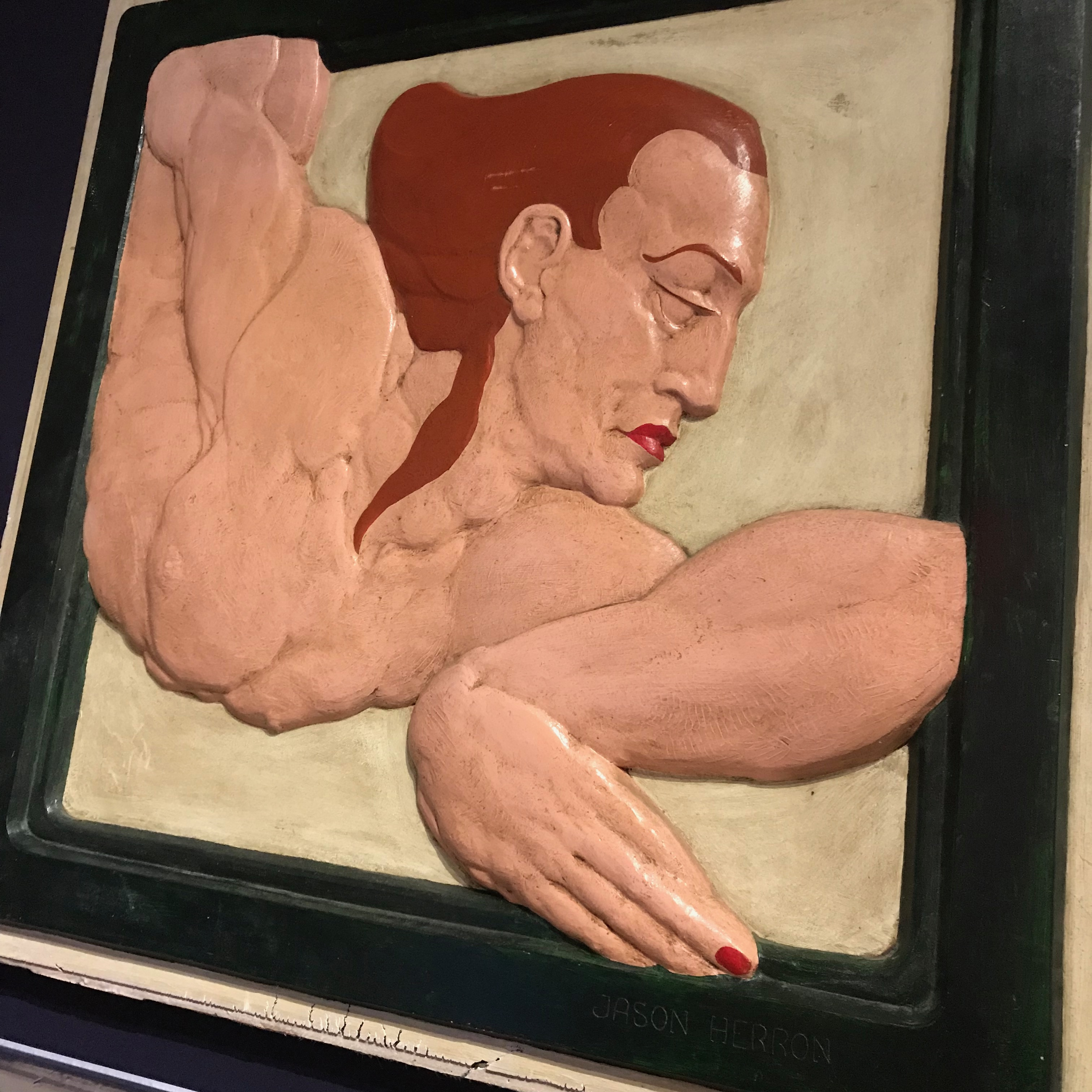
- Woman in Profile by Jessie Herron.
- Born: September 11, 1900; Denver, Colorado, United States
- Died: June 3, 1984 (aged 83); Ventura, California, United States
- Occupation: Sculptor

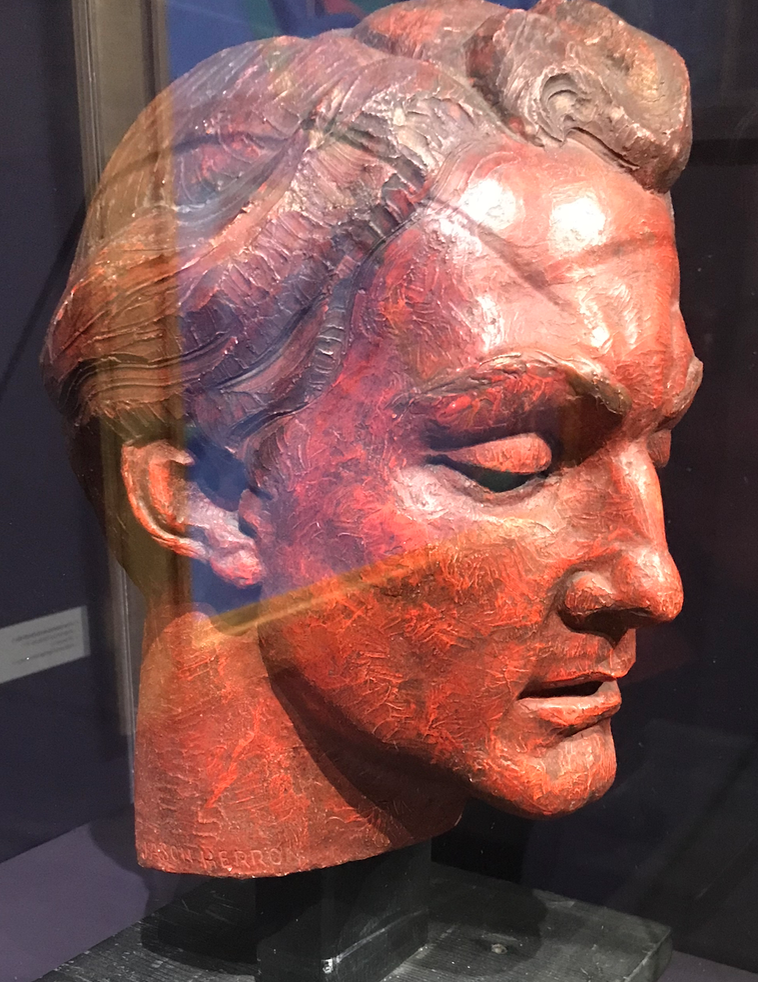
Untitled--Head of a Man by Jessie Herron.

Jessie Herron (September 11, 1900 – June 3, 1984) was an American sculptor. Her work was part of the sculpture event in the art competition at the 1932 Summer Olympics.
