= Antonín Landa =

Czech painter

- Born: 2 May 1899; Prague, Austria-Hungary
- Died: 8 April 1968 (aged 68); Prague, Czechoslovakia
- Occupation: Painter

Antonín Landa (2 May 1899 – 8 April 1968) was a Czech painter. His work was part of the painting event in the art competition at the 1932 Summer Olympics.
