= Donald Wood (painter) =

British painter

- Born: 28 May 1889; Leeds, England
- Died: 12 March 1953 (aged 63); Kensington, England
- Occupation: Painter

Donald Wood (28 May 1889 – 12 March 1953) was a British painter. His work was part of the painting event in the art competition at the 1932 Summer Olympics.
