= Eleanor Modrakowska =

American painter

- Born: March 29, 1879; College Point, New York, United States
- Died: April 2, 1956 (aged 77)
- Occupation: Painter

Eleanor Modrakowska (March 29, 1879 – April 2, 1956) was an American painter. Her work was part of the painting event in the art competition at the 1932 Summer Olympics.
