= Michel Jungblut =

Luxembourgish sculptor

- Born: 28 May 1887; Remich, Luxembourg
- Died: 27 October 1977 (aged 90); Remich, Luxembourg
- Occupation: Sculptor

Michel Jungblut (28 May 1887 – 27 October 1977) was a Luxembourgish sculptor. His work was part of the sculpture event in the art competition at the 1932 Summer Olympics.

== Life and work ==
Michel Jungblut was a son of roofer Pierre Joseph Jungblut and Marguerite Griffrath. He married Anna Declairfayt (c.1887-1950). They were the parents of painter Victor Jungblut and uncle and aunt of sculptor Josy Jungblut.

Jungblut was trained as a woodcarver and cabinetmaker and later worked as a stone sculptor. In addition to statues of saints, he mainly supplied church furniture. He showed his work between 1926 and 1938 at the annual salons of the Cercle Artistique de Luxembourg. In early 1932, Jungblut participated in a design competition for a monument commemorating Minister of State Paul Eyschen and came third, after Joseph Sünnen and Jean Curot. At the Summer Olympics in Los Angeles (1932), he was the only Luxembourger to participate in the sculpture part of the art competitions, with a sculpture of a goalkeeper. He also represented his country at the 1935 World's Fair in Brussels. At the 1939 New York World's Fair, four four-meter-high cast-iron statues symbolizing different professions were placed in the Luxembourg pavilion. Michel Jungblut -assisted by brother Joseph- depicted viticulture, Claus Cito the trades, Albert Kratzenberg mining and Lucien Wercollier agriculture. In 1940, with Jean-Théodore Mergen and Michel Haagen, he was involved in the revival of the "Société des Artistes Décorateurs du Grand-Duché de Luxembourg Ardeco," which had previously existed only briefly (1923-1929).

Michel Jungblut died at the age of 90.
