= Kiril Shivarov =

Bulgarian artist

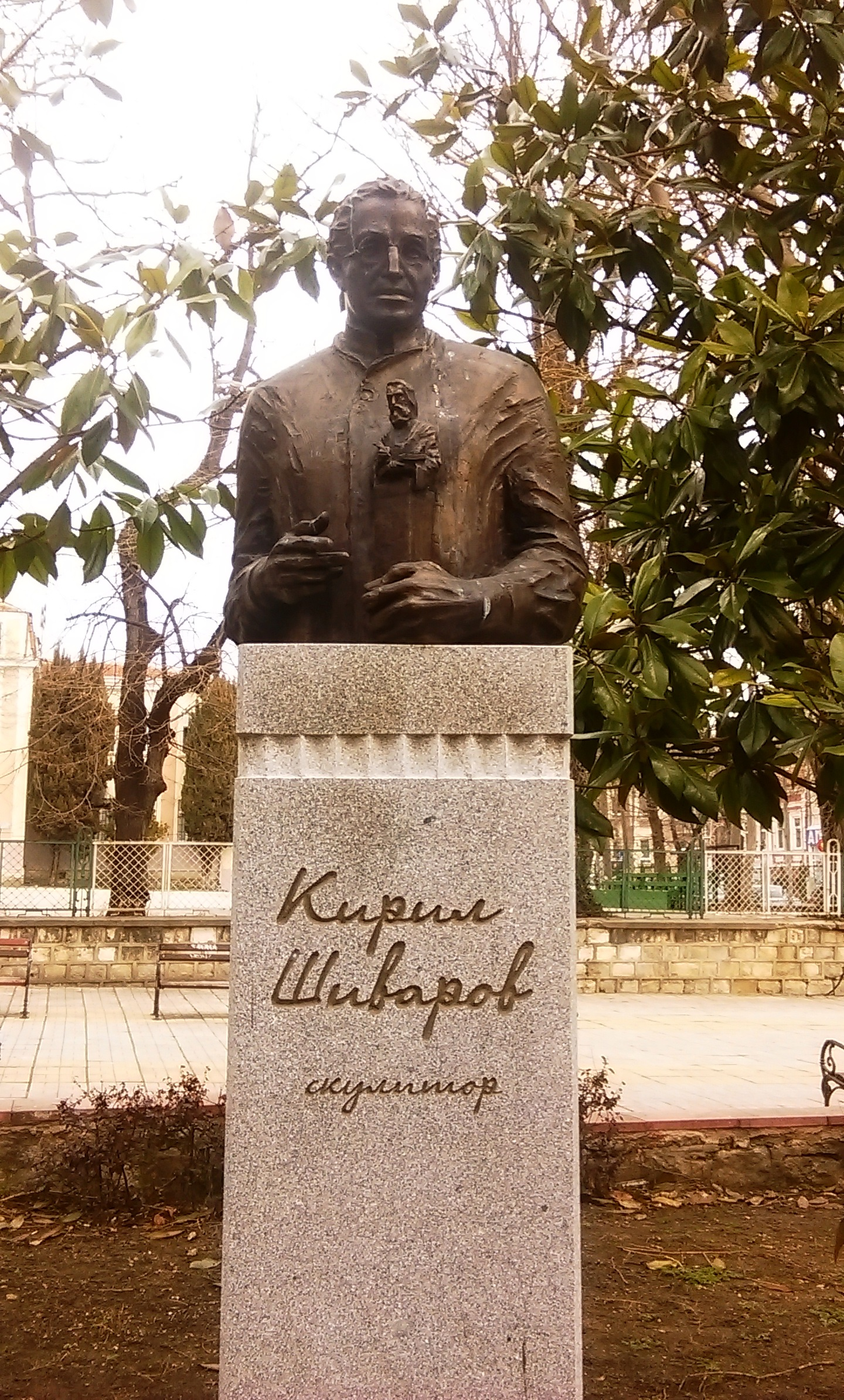
- Born: 13 July 1887; Varna, Bulgaria
- Died: 26 March 1938 (aged 50); Sofia, Bulgaria
- Occupation: Artist

Kiril Shivarov (15 July 1887 – 26 March 1938) was a Bulgarian artist. His work was part of the art competition at the 1932 Summer Olympics.
