= Lorraine Eckardt =

American composer (1914–1991)

- Born: September 13, 1914; Toronto, Ontario, Canada
- Died: September 1991; Woodland Hills, California, United States
- Occupation: Composer

Lorraine Eckardt (September 13, 1914 – September 1991) was an American composer. Her work was part of the music event in the art competition at the 1932 Summer Olympics.
