= Arvid Knöppel (sculptor) =

Swedish sculptor

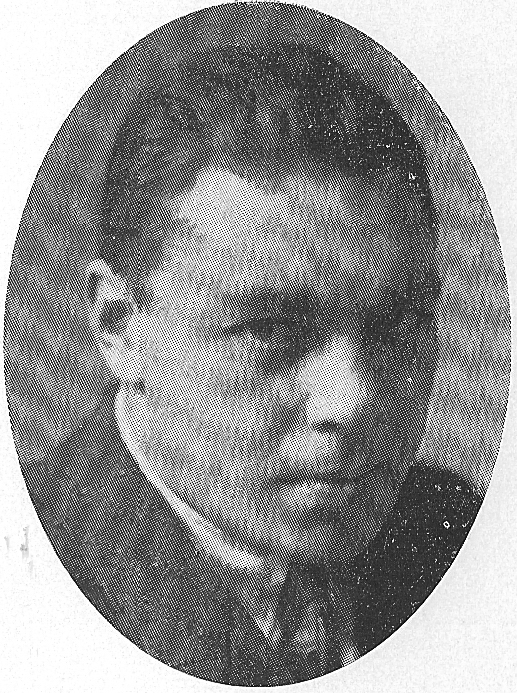
- Born: 25 April 1892; Luleå, Sweden
- Died: 21 June 1970 (aged 78); Sälboda, Sweden
- Occupation: Sculptor

Arvid Knöppel (25 April 1892 – 21 June 1970) was a Swedish sculptor. His work was part of the sculpture event in the art competition at the 1932 Summer Olympics.
