= Hans Swansee =

Swiss artist

- Born: 27 January 1902; Zürich, Switzerland
- Died: 13 July 1959 (aged 57); Glendale, California, United States
- Occupation: Artist

Hans Swansee (27 January 1902 – 13 July 1959) was a Swiss artist. His work was part of the art competition at the 1932 Summer Olympics.
