= Miroslav Bedřich Böhnel =

Czech writer

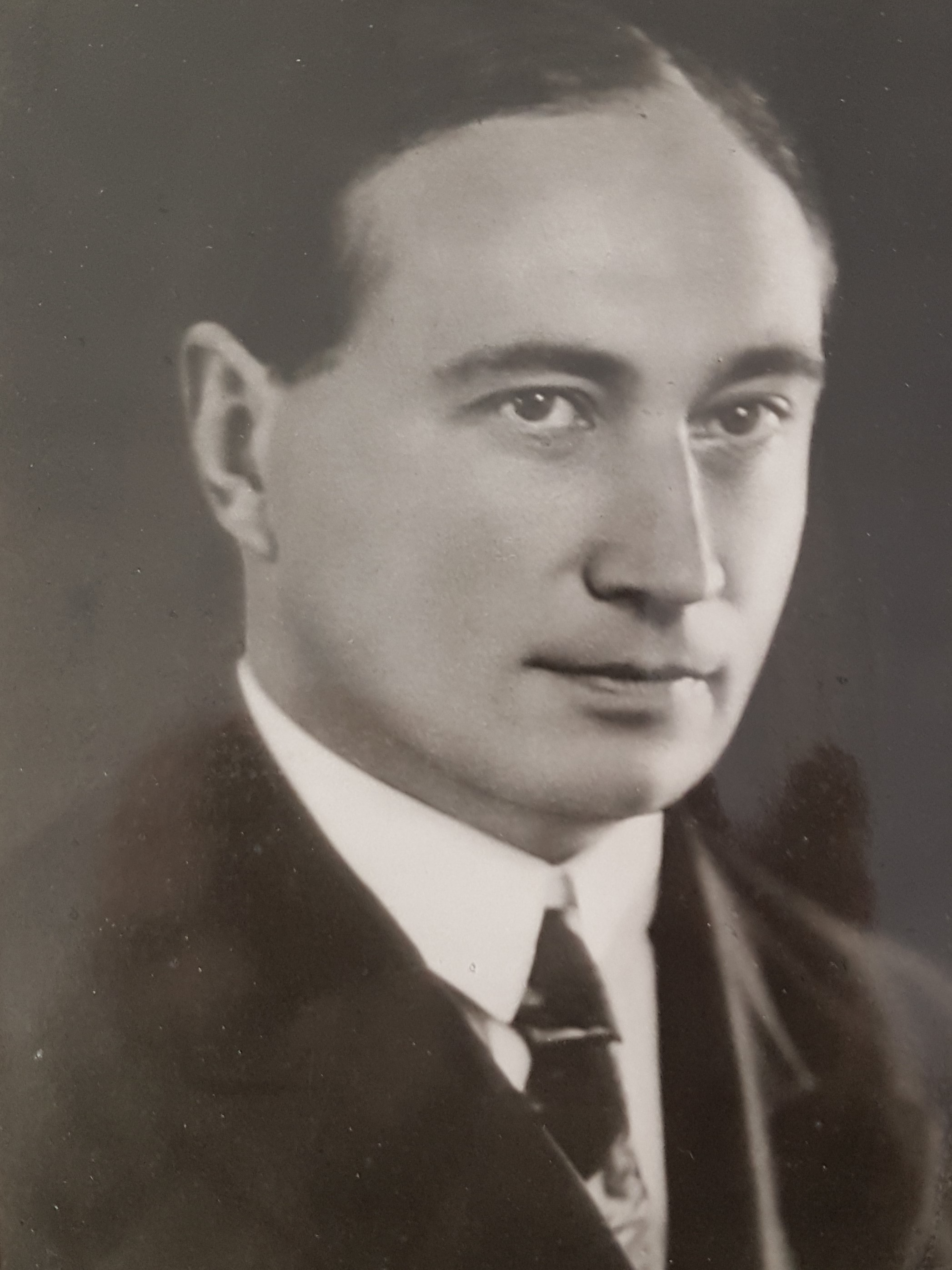
- Born: 3 July 1886; Brno, Austria-Hungary
- Died: 23 September 1962 (aged 76); Prague, Czechoslovakia
- Occupation: Writer

Miroslav Bedřich Böhnel (3 July 1886 – 23 September 1962) was a Czech writer. His work was part of the literature event in the art competition at the 1932 Summer Olympics.
