= Richard Demeyer =

Belgian sculptor

- Born: 20 October 1890; Ghent, Belgium
- Died: 20 June 1964 (aged 73); Ghent, Belgium
- Occupation: Sculptor

Richard Demeyer (20 October 1890 – 20 June 1964) was a Belgian sculptor. His work was part of the sculpture event in the art competition at the 1932 Summer Olympics. The art competitions at the Olympics, which ran from 1912 to 1948, were unique opportunities for artists to engage with themes of sport and human achievement, and Demeyer's participation highlighted his standing in the art community.
