= Walt Speck =

American painter

- Born: August 29, 1896; Detroit, Michigan, United States
- Died: October 11, 1979 (aged 83); Claremont, California, United States
- Occupation: Painter

Walt Speck (August 29, 1896 – October 11, 1979) was an American painter. His work was part of the painting event in the art competition at the 1932 Summer Olympics.
