= Alfred Duriau =

Belgian painter

- Born: 6 December 1877; Mons, Belgium
- Died: 1958 (aged 80–81); Mons, Belgium
- Occupation: Painter

Alfred Duriau (6 December 1877 – 1958) was a Belgian painter. His work was part of the painting event in the art competition at the 1932 Summer Olympics.

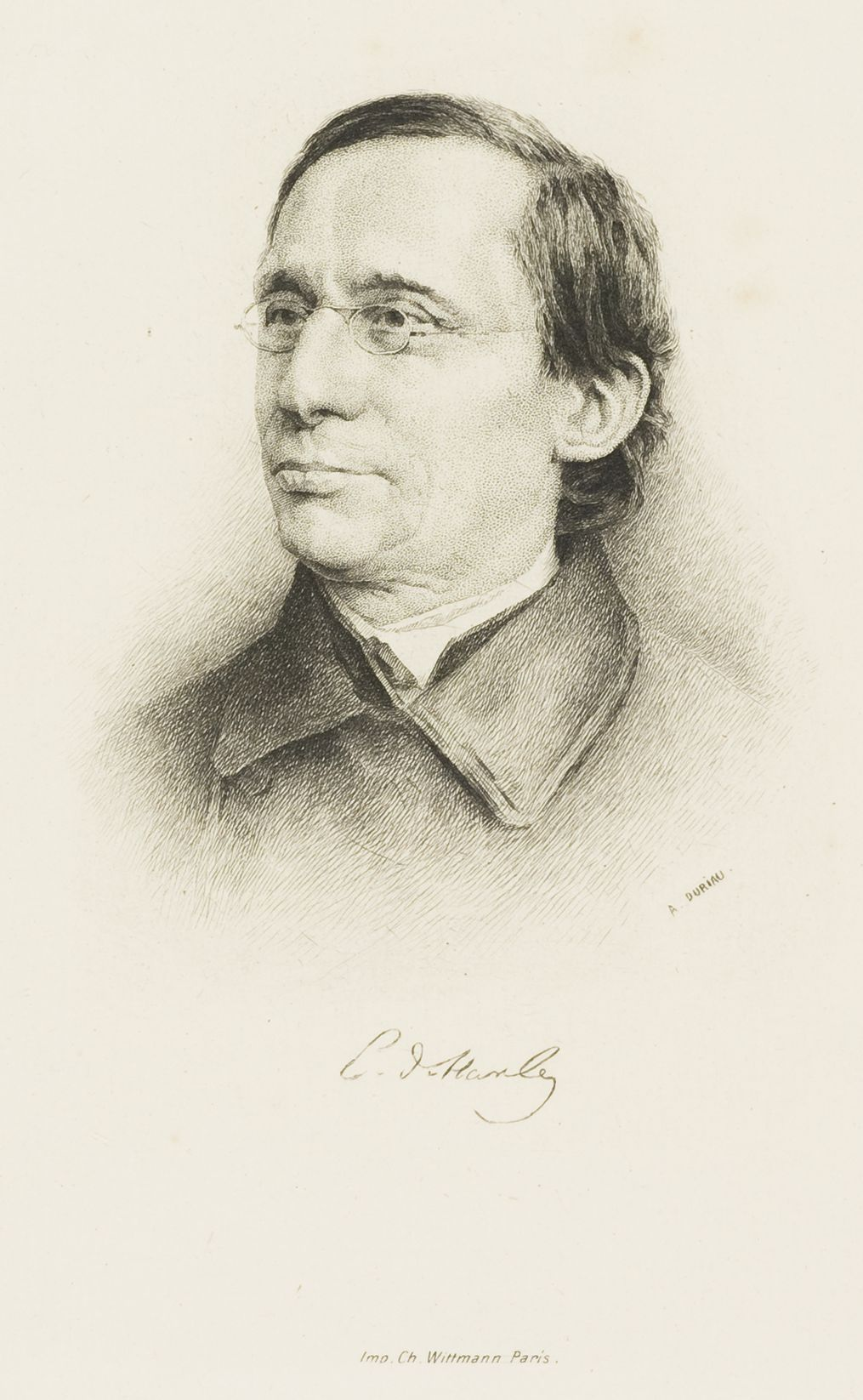
Charles de Harlez (by Alfred Duriau)

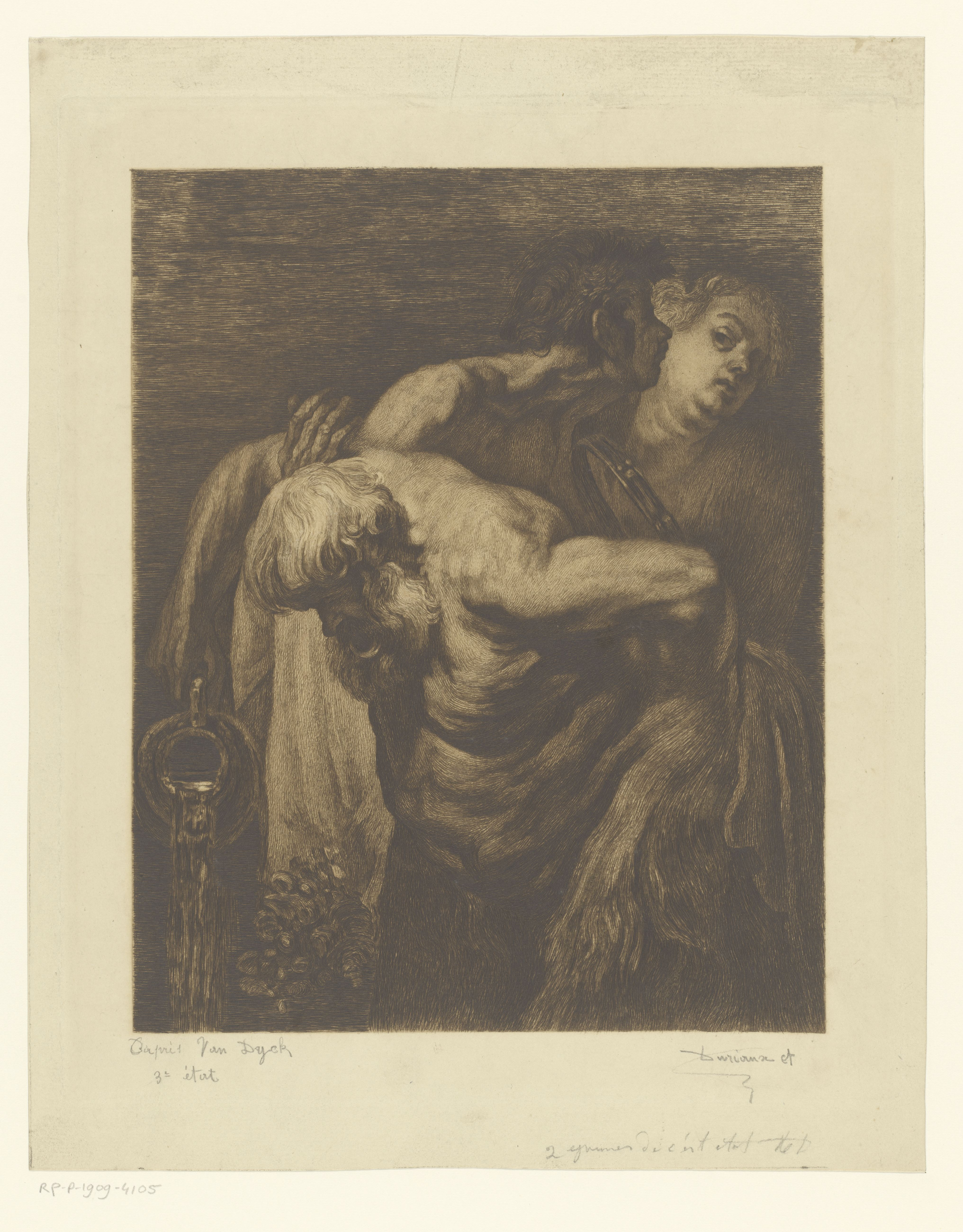
Drunk Silenus (by Alfred Duriau)
