= Anders Holm (writer) =

Danish writer (1878–1959)

- Born: 21 December 1878; Copenhagen, Denmark
- Died: 29 June 1959 (aged 80); Copenhagen, Denmark
- Occupation: Writer

Anders Holm (21 December 1878 – 29 June 1959) was a Danish writer. His work was part of the literature event in the art competition at the 1932 Summer Olympics.
