= Conrad Carlman =

Swedish sculptor

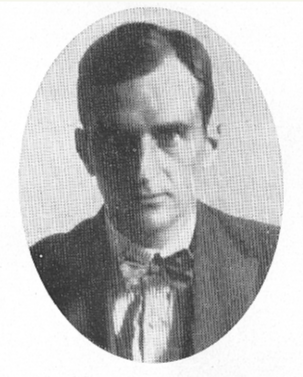
- Born: 16 January 1891; Karlskrona, Sweden
- Died: 19 July 1945 (aged 54); Stockholm, Sweden
- Occupation: Sculptor

Conrad Carlman (16 January 1891 – 19 July 1945) was a Swedish sculptor. His work was part of the sculpture event in the art competition at the 1932 Summer Olympics.
