= Katsundo Kosaka =

Japanese painter

- Born: 1901; Takaoka, Japan
- Died: 1953 (aged 51–52)
- Occupation: Painter

Katsundo Kosaka (1901 – 1953) was a Japanese painter. His work was part of the painting event in the art competition at the 1932 Summer Olympics.
