= Oliver Milburn (painter) =

Canadian painter

- Born: 17 September 1883; Toronto, Ontario, Canada
- Died: 14 December 1932 (aged 49); Los Angeles, California, United States
- Occupation: Painter

Oliver Milburn (17 September 1883 – 14 December 1932) was a Canadian painter. His work was part of the painting event in the art competition at the 1932 Summer Olympics.
