= Eugène Pechaubes =

French painter

- Born: 24 June 1890; Pantin, France
- Died: 2 February 1967 (aged 76); Paris, France
- Occupation: Painter

Eugène Pechaubes (24 June 1890 – 2 February 1967) was a French painter. His work was part of the painting event in the art competition at the 1932 Summer Olympics.
