= Hermann Tamussino =

Austrian architect

- Born: 15 December 1898; Mödling, Austria-Hungary
- Died: 23 April 1969 (aged 70); Mödling, Austria
- Occupation: Architect

Hermann Tamussino (15 December 1898 – 23 April 1969) was an Austrian architect. His work was part of the architecture event in the art competition at the 1932 Summer Olympics.
