= Józef Krudowski =

Polish composer

- Born: 18 January 1881; Mława, Poland
- Died: 7 August 1943 (aged 62); Oświęcim, Poland
- Occupation: Composer

Józef Krudowski (18 January 1881 – 7 August 1943) was a Polish composer. His work was part of the music event in the art competition at the 1932 Summer Olympics. He was murdered in the Auschwitz concentration camp during World War II.
