= Sigurd Forchhammer =

Danish sculptor

- Born: 18 April 1906; Neu-Isenburg, Germany
- Died: 12 March 1981 (aged 74); Copenhagen, Denmark
- Occupation: Sculptor

Sigurd Forchhammer (18 April 1906 – 12 March 1981) was a Danish sculptor. His work was part of the sculpture event in the art competition at the 1932 Summer Olympics.
