= Kathleen Ingels =

American sculptor

- Born: December 31, 1882; Toronto, Ontario, Canada
- Died: July 14, 1958 (aged 75); San Bernardino, California, United States
- Occupation: Sculptor

Kathleen Ingels (December 31, 1882 – July 14, 1958) was an American sculptor. Her work was part of the sculpture event in the art competition at the 1932 Summer Olympics.
