= Lewis Daniel =

American painter

- Born: October 23, 1901; New York, New York, United States
- Died: July 18, 1952 (aged 50); Dixon, Illinois, United States
- Occupation: Painter

Lewis Daniel (October 23, 1901 – July 18, 1952) was an American painter. His work was part of the painting event in the art competition at the 1932 Summer Olympics.
