= Zbigniew Czech (painter) =

Polish painter

- Born: 20 April 1909; Ciechanów, Poland
- Died: 4 August 1973 (aged 64); Melbourne, Australia
- Occupation: Painter

Zbigniew Czech (20 April 1909 – 4 August 1973) was a Polish painter. His work was part of the painting event in the art competition at the 1932 Summer Olympics.
