= Amory Simons =

American sculptor

- Born: April 5, 1866; Aiken, South Carolina, United States
- Died: July 24, 1959 (aged 93); Santa Barbara, California, United States
- Occupation: Sculptor

Amory Simons (April 5, 1866 – July 24, 1959) was an American sculptor. His work was part of the sculpture event in the art competition at the 1932 Summer Olympics.
