= Michael Merecki =

American composer

- Born: September 30, 1878; Detroit, Michigan, United States
- Died: 1958 (aged 79–80)
- Occupation: Composer

Michael Merecki (September 30, 1878 – 1958) was an American composer. His work was part of the music event in the art competition at the 1932 Summer Olympics.
