= Herbert Garbe =

German sculptor

- Born: 1 June 1888; Berlin, Germany
- Died: 17 July 1945 (aged 57); Rennes, France
- Occupation: Sculptor

Herbert Garbe (1 June 1888 – 17 July 1945) was a German sculptor. His work was part of the sculpture event in the art competition at the 1932 Summer Olympics.

== Personal life ==
While living in France at the end of the Second World War, Garbe was imprisoned by French authorities due to his involvement with the Nazi Party. He died in a prisoner of war camp in Rennes on 17 July 1945.
