= Tore Strindberg =

Swedish sculptor

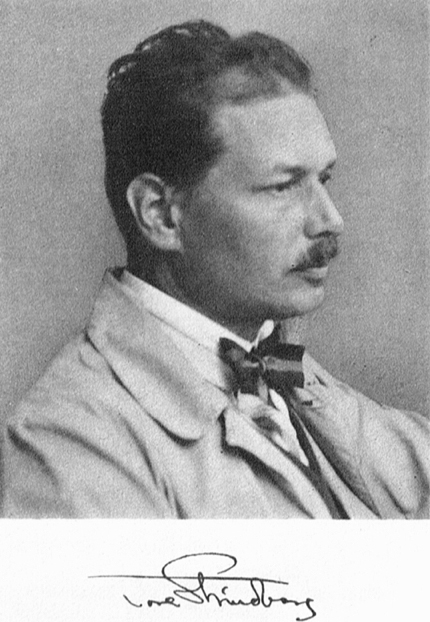
- Born: 19 February 1882; Stockholm, Sweden
- Died: 6 February 1968 (aged 85); Stockholm, Sweden
- Occupation: Sculptor

Tore Strindberg (19 February 1882 – 6 February 1968) was a Swedish sculptor. His work was part of the sculpture event in the art competition at the 1932 Summer Olympics.
