= Giovanni Del Colle =

American composer (born 1858)

- Born: August 24, 1858; Campobasso, Kingdom of the Two Sicilies
- Occupation: Composer

Giovanni Del Colle (born August 24, 1858, date of death unknown) was an American composer. His work was part of the music event in the art competition at the 1932 Summer Olympics.
