= J. Duncan Gleason =

American painter

- Born: August 3, 1881; Watsonville, California, U.S.
- Died: March 9, 1959 (aged 77); Glendale, California, U.S.
- Resting place: Forest Lawn Memorial Park
- Education: University of Southern California; Mark Hopkins Institute of Art; Chicago Art Institute; Art Students League of New York; Academy of San Carlos
- Occupations: Engraver, illustrator, painter
- Spouse: Dorothy Ferguson
- Children: 2 daughters

J. Duncan Gleason (August 3, 1881 – March 9, 1959) was an American engraver, illustrator, and painter who became the "leader of [the] ultraconservative school" in Los Angeles, California.

== Life ==
Gleason was born on August 3, 1881, in Watsonville, California. He was trained at the University of Southern California, the Mark Hopkins Institute of Art, the Chicago Art Institute, the Art Students League of New York, and the Academy of San Carlos.

Gleason began his career as an engraver for the Sunset Engraving Company in 1899. He was also an illustrator for the Ladies Home Journal and Cosmopolitan. He later worked in the art departments of Metro Goldwyn Mayer and Warner Brothers. Many of his paintings depicted ships. According to The Los Angeles Times, he was the "leader of [the] ultraconservative school" in Los Angeles.

Gleason married Dorothy Ferguson, and they had two daughters. He died on March 9, 1959, in Glendale, California, at age 77, and he was buried in the Forest Lawn Memorial Park. His work can be seen at the Laguna Art Museum. His work was also part of the painting event in the art competition at the 1932 Summer Olympics.
