= Earl Purdy =

American painter

- Born: June 6, 1892; Cohoes, New York, United States
- Died: April 22, 1971 (aged 78); New Rochelle, New York, United States
- Occupation: Painter

Earl Purdy (June 6, 1892 – April 22, 1971) was an American painter. His work was part of the painting event in the art competition at the 1932 Summer Olympics.
