= Hermann Keimel =

German painter

Hermann Keimel (February 24, 1889 – October 15, 1948) was a German painter, graphic artist and commercial artist. He was born in Munich. His work was part of the painting event in the art competition at the 1932 Summer Olympics.

== Works ==
Keimel creates posters for:

- Deutschnationale Volkspartei, 1924
- Münchner Fasching, 1929
- Perutz Film 1930,
- Winter in Bayern 1930,
- Die Wunder Bar 1930,
- Die Arche Noa (orientalisches Künstlerfest München) 1929 und 1930,
- Plakatkunst München, 1931
- Für Recht und Freiheit Bayerische Volkspartei, 1932
- Deutsche Heeresskimeisterschaften Berchtesgaden, 1934
- Deutsche kauft deutsche Ware, Deutsche Woche deutsche Ware deutsche Arbeit, 1932
- Illustrationen zu Tiere aus Haus und Hof, Verlag Nürnberg A. Jaser, 1926
- Münchner Fasching, 1929
- 24 Gebrauchsschriften : Für Werkstatt u. Schule, München Callwey Verlag, 1937
