= Menno van Meeteren Brouwer =

Dutch painter

- Born: 11 October 1882; Zwolle, Netherlands
- Died: 11 July 1974 (aged 91); Rijswijk, Netherlands
- Occupation: Painter

Menno van Meeteren Brouwer (11 October 1882 – 11 July 1974) was a Dutch painter. His work was part of the painting event in the art competition at the 1932 Summer Olympics.
