= Gösta Carell =

Swedish sculptor (1888–1962)

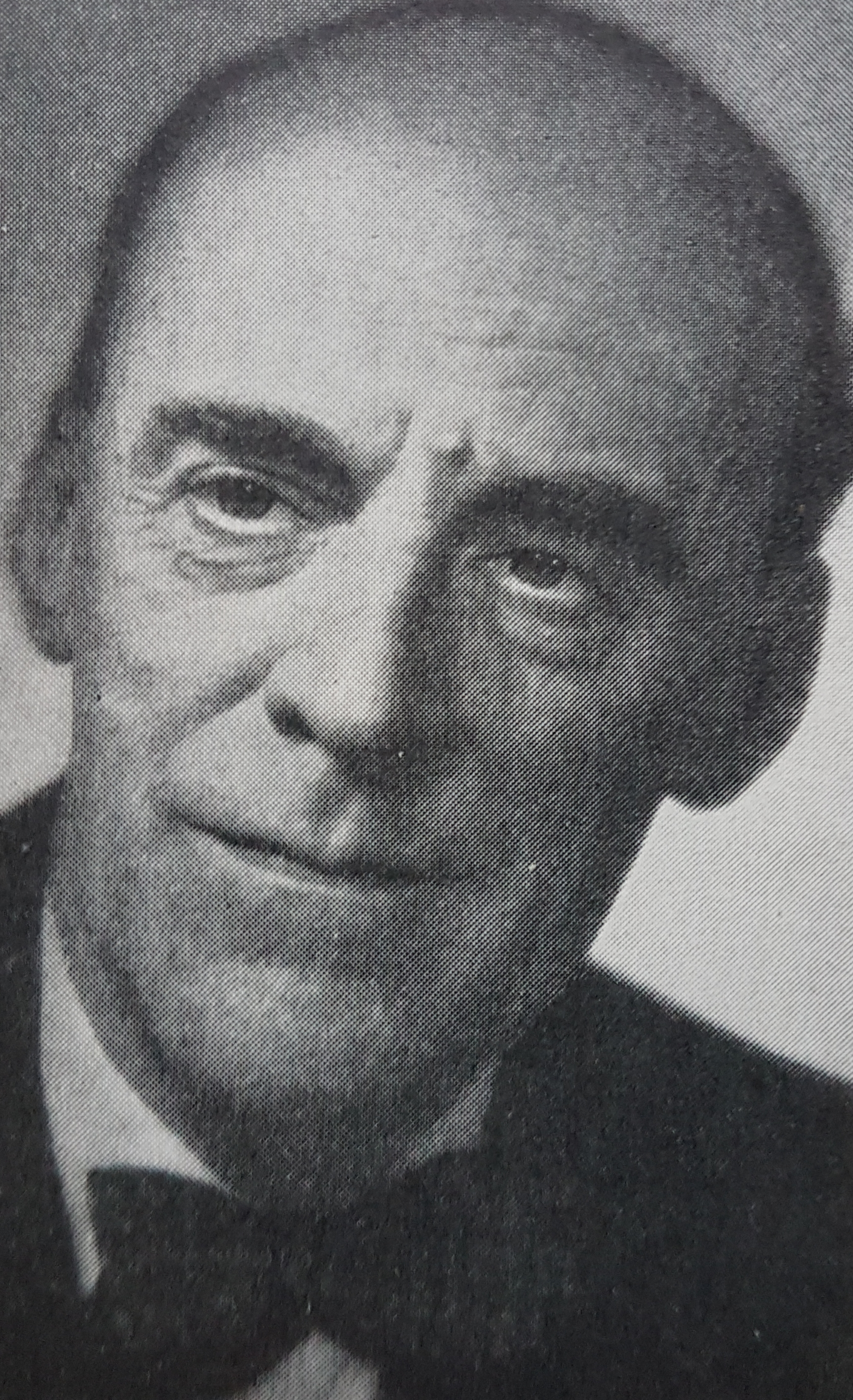
- Born: 21 May 1888; Stockholm, Sweden
- Died: 23 May 1962 (aged 74); Stockholm, Sweden
- Occupation: Sculptor

Gösta Carell (21 May 1888 – 23 May 1962) was a Swedish sculptor. His work was part of the sculpture event in the art competition at the 1932 Summer Olympics. He was the son of Gustaf Carell, an inspector, and Ida Nilsson, and married first in 1914 to Emmy Bogstrand and second in 1942 to Hjördis Moberg.
