= Arthur Freedlander =

American painter

- Born: August 2, 1876; New York, New York, United States
- Died: June 24, 1940 (aged 63); New York, New York, United States
- Occupation: Painter

Arthur Freedlander (August 2, 1876 – June 24, 1940) was an American painter. His work was part of the painting event in the art competition at the 1932 Summer Olympics.
