= John Branner =

American architect

- Born: August 4, 1886; Bloomington, Indiana, United States
- Died: September 11, 1968 (aged 82); San Francisco, California, United States
- Occupation: Architect

John Branner (August 4, 1886 – September 11, 1968) was an American architect. His work was part of the architecture event in the art competition at the 1932 Summer Olympics.
