= Shogo Taguchi =

Japanese painter

- Born: 1897; Kakunodate, Japan
- Died: 14 August 1943 (aged 45–46); Shinjuku, Japan
- Occupation: Painter

Shogo Taguchi (1897 – 14 August 1943) was a Japanese painter. His work was part of the painting event in the art competition at the 1932 Summer Olympics.
