= Theodor Pilartz =

German sculptor

- Born: 21 February 1887; Cologne, Germany
- Died: 29 June 1955 (aged 68); Cologne, Germany
- Occupation: Sculptor

Theodor Pilartz (21 February 1887 – 29 June 1955) was a German sculptor. His work was part of the sculpture event in the art competition at the 1932 Summer Olympics.
