= Kenji Ishihara =

Japanese architect

- Born: 28 February 1895; Hyogo, Japan
- Died: 11 July 1984 (aged 89)
- Occupation: Architect

Kenji Ishihara (28 February 1895 – 11 July 1984) was a Japanese architect. His work was part of the architecture event in the art competition at the 1932 Summer Olympics.
