= Junpei Eto =

Japanese painter

- Born: 25 March 1898; Usuki, Japan
- Died: 16 November 1987 (aged 89); Mitaka, Japan
- Occupation: Painter

Junpei Eto (25 March 1898 – 16 November 1987) was a Japanese painter. His work was part of the painting event in the art competition at the 1932 Summer Olympics.
