= Karl Skoog =

American sculptor

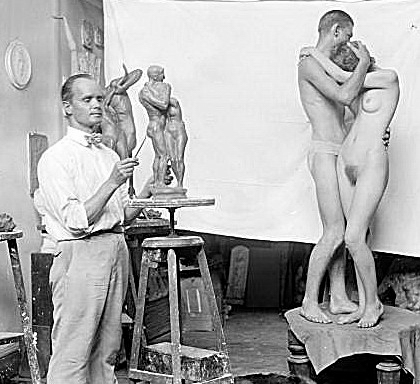
- Born: November 3, 1878; Väse, Sweden
- Died: June 4, 1933 (aged 54); Boston, Massachusetts, United States
- Occupation: Sculptor

Karl Skoog (November 3, 1878 – June 4, 1933) was an American sculptor. His work was part of the sculpture event in the art competition at the 1932 Summer Olympics.
