= Paul Heimen =

German painter

- Born: 16 March 1898; Kaldenkirchen, Germany
- Died: 25 August 1978 (aged 80); Herongen, Germany
- Occupation: Painter

Paul Heimen (16 March 1898 – 25 August 1978) was a German painter. His work was part of the painting event in the art competition at the 1932 Summer Olympics.
