= Raphaël Van Dorpe =

Belgian architect

- Born: 15 July 1910; Ghent, Belgium
- Died: 30 April 1996 (aged 85); Ghent, Belgium
- Occupation: Architect

Raphaël Van Dorpe (15 July 1910 – 30 April 1996) was a Belgian architect. His work was part of the architecture event in the art competition at the 1932 Summer Olympics.
