= John MacGilchrist =

American painter

- Born: July 12, 1893; Stirling, Scotland
- Died: May 1977 (aged 83–84); Coronado, California, United States
- Occupation: Painter

John MacGilchrist (July 12, 1893 – May 1977) was an American painter. His work was part of the painting event in the art competition at the 1932 Summer Olympics.
