= Antonín Odehnal =

Czech sculptor

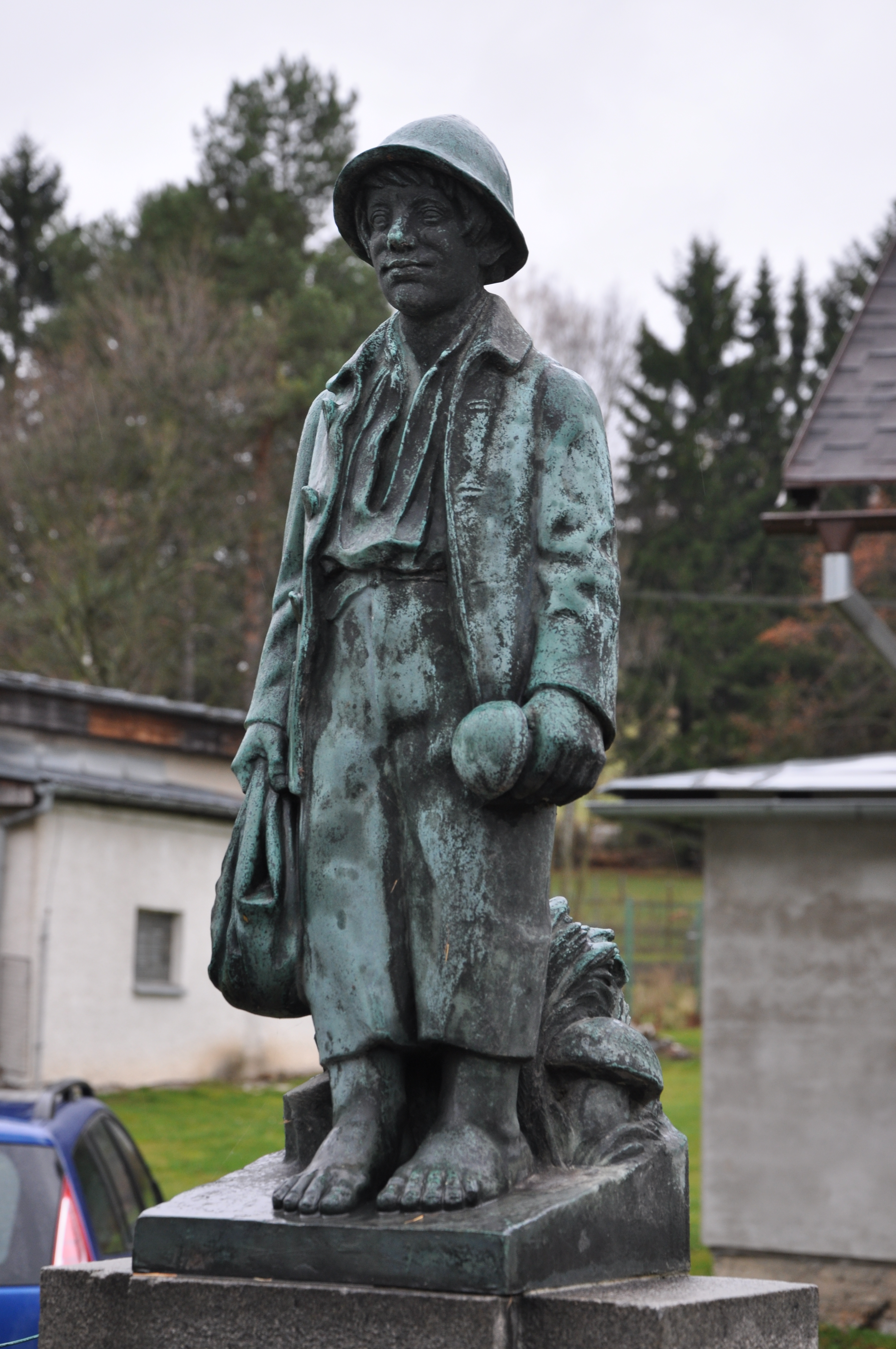
- Born: 1 October 1878; Svratka, Austria-Hungary
- Died: 6 April 1957 (aged 78); Prague, Czechoslovakia
- Occupation: Sculptor

Antonín Odehnal (1 October 1878 – 6 April 1957) was a Czechoslovak sculptor. His work was part of the sculpture event in the art competition at the 1932 Summer Olympics.
