= Mehmet Saıp =

Turkish artist

- Born: 1901; Istanbul, Turkey
- Died: 21 July 1974 (aged 72–73); Ankara, Turkey
- Occupation: Artist

Mehmet Saıp (1901 – 21 July 1974) was a Turkish artist. His work was part of the art competition at the 1932 Summer Olympics.
