= Ryokichi Sakai =

Japanese painter

- Born: 1897; Osaka, Japan
- Died: 10 July 1952 (aged 54–55); Tokyo, Japan
- Occupation: Painter

Ryokichi Sakai (1897 – 10 July 1952) was a Japanese painter. His work was part of the painting event in the art competition at the 1932 Summer Olympics.
