= Saburo Hamada =

Japanese sculptor

- Born: 21 December 1892; Hakodate, Japan
- Died: 10 November 1973 (aged 80)
- Occupation: Sculptor

Saburo Hamada (21 December 1892 – 10 November 1973) was a Japanese sculptor. His work was part of the sculpture event in the art competition at the 1932 Summer Olympics.
