= Joseph Conrardy =

Belgian painter

- Born: 11 October 1876
- Died: 18 February 1949 (aged 72)
- Occupation: Painter

Joseph Conrardy (11 October 1876 – 18 February 1949) was a Belgian painter. His work was part of the painting event in the art competition at the 1932 Summer Olympics.
