= Alphonse Henriquez =

Haitian composer

- Born: 1879
- Died: 20 December 1955 (aged 75–76); Port-au-Prince, Haiti
- Occupation: Composer

Alphonse Henriquez (1879 – 20 December 1955) was a Haitian composer. His work was part of the music event in the art competition at the 1932 Summer Olympics.
