= Masaichi Kobayashi =

Japanese architect

- Born: 14 February 1891; Ibaraki, Japan
- Died: 25 December 1973 (aged 82)
- Occupation: Architect

Masaichi Kobayashi (14 February 1891 – 25 December 1973) was a Japanese architect. His work was part of the architecture event in the art competition at the 1932 Summer Olympics.
