= Kotaro Ikeda =

Japanese painter

- Born: 28 March 1895; Tokyo, Japan
- Died: 16 August 1976 (aged 81); Tokyo, Japan
- Occupation: Painter

Kotaro Ikeda (池田 幸太郎, Ikeda Kōtarō; 28 March 1895 – 16 August 1976) was a Japanese painter. His work was part of the painting event in the art competition at the 1932 Summer Olympics.
