= Shuzo Kanda =

Japanese painter

- Born: 1894; Hiroshima, Japan
- Died: 5 March 1972 (aged 77–78)
- Occupation: Painter

Shuzo Kanda (1894 – 5 March 1972) was a Japanese painter. His work was part of the painting event in the art competition at the 1932 Summer Olympics.
