= Haruyoshi Nagae =

Japanese painter

- Born: 18 February 1893; Kyoto, Japan
- Died: 20 April 1961 (aged 68)
- Occupation: Painter

Haruyoshi Nagae (18 February 1893 – 20 April 1961) was a Japanese painter. His work was part of the painting event in the art competition at the 1932 Summer Olympics.
