= Andrzej Stypiński =

Polish painter

- Born: 18 February 1907; Warsaw, Poland
- Died: 11 March 1975 (aged 68); Warsaw, Poland
- Occupation: Painter

Andrzej Stypiński (18 February 1907 – 11 March 1975) was a Polish painter. His work was part of the painting event in the art competition at the 1932 Summer Olympics.
