= Maud von Rosen-Engberg =

Swedish sculptor

- Born: 2 August 1902; Julita, Sweden
- Died: 13 December 1988 (aged 86); Eslöv, Sweden
- Occupation: Sculptor

Maud von Rosen-Engberg (2 August 1902 – 13 December 1988) was a Swedish sculptor. Her work was part of the sculpture event in the art competition at the 1932 Summer Olympics.
