= Alexander Tiranoff =

American painter

- Born: September 21, 1882; Russia
- Died: January 1972
- Occupation: Painter

Alexander Tiranoff (September 21, 1882 – January 1972) was an American painter. His work was part of the painting event in the art competition at the 1932 Summer Olympics.
