= József Kucharik =

Hungarian writer

- Born: 1 January 1886; Budapest, Austria-Hungary
- Died: 10 March 1965 (aged 79)
- Occupation: Writer

József Kucharik (1 January 1886 – 10 March 1965) was a Hungarian writer. His work was part of the literature event in the art competition at the 1932 Summer Olympics.
