= Edwin Everett Codman =

American sculptor (1876–1955)

- Centerpiece modeled by Edwin Everett Codman, 1903
- Born: December 19, 1876; London, England, United Kingdom
- Died: April 29, 1955 (aged 79); Dorset, Vermont, United States
- Occupation: Sculptor

Edwin Everett Codman (December 19, 1876 – April 29, 1955) was an American sculptor. His work was part of the sculpture event in the art competition at the 1932 Summer Olympics. Codman committed suicide by shooting himself in 1955, after suffering from inoperable cancer for 2 years. While working for Gorham Mfg., he designed and copyrighted a small bronze bust of Thomas Edison (3.75" tall) for an electrical convention (September 1910) in the Thousand Islands (at the Hotel Frontenac). Some 200 of these were distributed by the AEIC with the specific details engraved on the bases.
