= Takamura Kodama =

Japanese painter

- Born: 1901 (age 124–125); Nagano, Japan
- Occupation: Painter

Takamura Kodama (born 1901, date of death unknown) was a Japanese painter. His work was part of the painting event in the art competition at the 1932 Summer Olympics.
