= Pierre Toulgouat =

French sculptor

- Born: 14 July 1901; Vernon, France
- Died: 13 April 1992 (aged 90); Paris, France
- Occupation: Sculptor

Pierre Toulgouat (14 July 1901 – 13 April 1992) was a French sculptor. His work was part of the sculpture event in the art competition at the 1932 Summer Olympics.
