= Albert Matignon =

French painter

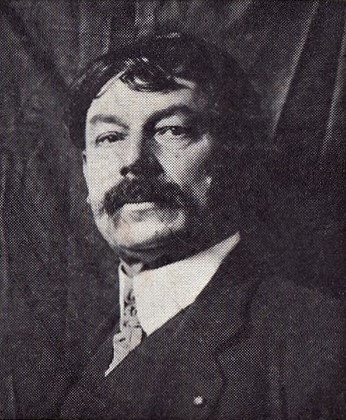
- Born: 11 June 1860; Sablé-sur-Sarthe, France
- Died: 17 June 1937 (aged 77); Sablé-sur-Sarthe, France
- Occupation: Painter

Albert Matignon (11 June 1860 – 17 June 1937) was a French painter. His work was part of the painting event in the art competition at the 1932 Summer Olympics.
