= Chikatoshi Enomoto =

Japanese painter

- Born: 3 March 1898; Tokyo, Japan
- Died: 30 March 1973 (aged 75)
- Occupation: Painter

Chikatoshi Enomoto (榎本 千花俊, Enomoto Chikatoshi; 3 March 1898 – 30 March 1973) was a Japanese painter. His work was part of the painting event in the art competition at the 1932 Summer Olympics.

== Education ==
Chikatoshi was a student of the renowned Japanese Nihonga painter, Kaburagi Kiyokata, who he trained with at Tokyo University of the Arts.
