= Jessica Lewis (composer) =

American composer

- Born: 1887; Poland
- Occupation: Composer

Jessica Lewis (born 1887, date of death unknown) was an American composer. Her work was part of the music event in the art competition at the 1932 Summer Olympics.
