= Marinus Børup =

Danish writer

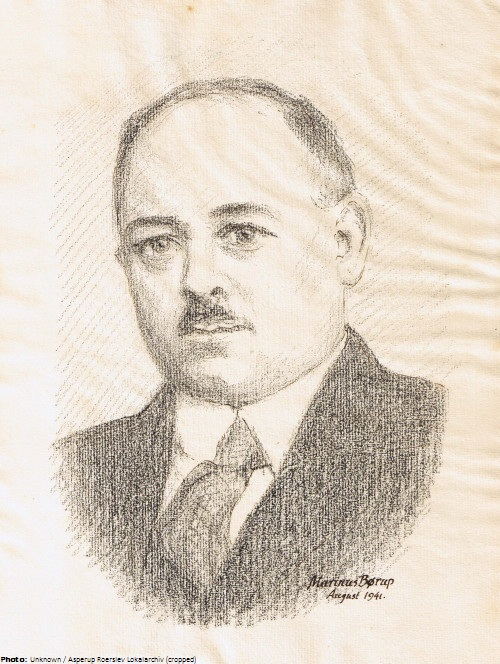
- Børup in 1941
- Born: 27 June 1891; Aarhus, Denmark
- Died: 15 September 1959 (aged 68); Frederiksberg, Denmark
- Occupation: Writer

Marinus Børup (27 June 1891 – 15 September 1959) was a Danish writer. His work was part of the literature event in the art competition at the 1932 Summer Olympics.
