= Philippe Le Molt =

French painter

- Born: 26 March 1895; Senlis, France
- Died: 5 April 1976 (aged 81); Paris, France
- Occupation: Painter

Philippe Le Molt (26 March 1895 – 5 April 1976) was a French painter. His work was part of the painting event in the art competition at the 1932 Summer Olympics.
