= Emil Neidenbach =

Hungarian writer

- Born: 15 June 1884; Bencecu de Sus, Austria-Hungary
- Died: 20 December 1957 (aged 73); Budapest, Hungary
- Occupation: Writer

Emil Neidenbach (15 June 1884 – 20 December 1957) was a Hungarian writer. His work was part of the literature event in the art competition at the 1932 Summer Olympics.
