= Edith Horle =

American painter

- Born: January 10, 1897; Syracuse, New York, United States
- Died: May 23, 1962 (aged 65); New York, New York, United States
- Occupation: Painter

Edith Horle (January 10, 1897 – May 23, 1962) was an American painter. Her work was part of the painting event in the art competition at the 1932 Summer Olympics.
