= Wilhelm Hölter =

German painter

- Born: 12 March 1904; Lemgo, Germany
- Died: 25 February 1989 (aged 84); Rottweil, Germany
- Occupation: Painter

Wilhelm Hölter (12 March 1904 – 25 February 1989) was a German painter. His work was part of the painting event in the art competition at the 1932 Summer Olympics.
