= Juan Gavazzo =

Argentine artist

- Born: 13 December 1888; Gualeguaychú, Entre Ríos, Argentina
- Died: 14 April 1965 (aged 76); Meudon, Hauts-de-Seine, France
- Occupation: Artist

Juan Manuel Gavazzo Buchardo (13 December 1888 – 14 April 1965) was an Argentine artist and diplomat. His work was part of the art competition at the 1932 Summer Olympics.

Gavazzo resided in Paris, France from 1915 to 1925. He received his artistic training at the Real Academia de Bellas Artes de San Fernando in Madrid, Spain and the Académie Ranson in Paris. He worked as a diplomat for Argentina from 1925 to 1952, serving in Spain, France, the United Kingdom, Italy, the Netherlands, Belgium, Germany, and Yugoslavia.
