= Marja Obrębska =

Polish painter

- Born: 14 February 1904; Vinnytsia, Ukraine
- Died: 9 October 1995 (aged 91); Warsaw, Poland
- Occupation: Painter

Marja Obrębska (14 February 1904 – 9 October 1995) was a Polish painter. Her work was part of the painting event in the art competition at the 1932 Summer Olympics.
