= Graham Douglas (sculptor) =

American sculptor

- Born: February 5, 1879; Terre Haute, Indiana, United States
- Died: July 11, 1954 (aged 75); Pasadena, California, United States
- Occupation: Sculptor

Graham Douglas (February 5, 1879 – July 11, 1954) was an American sculptor. His work was part of the sculpture event in the art competition at the 1932 Summer Olympics.
