= Axel Sjöberg (painter) =

Swedish painter

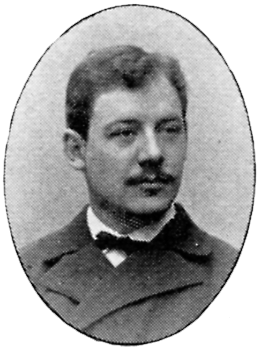
- Axel Sjöberg in 1901
- Born: 6 November 1866; Stockholm, Sweden
- Died: 5 October 1950 (aged 83); Stockholm, Sweden
- Occupation: Painter

Axel Sjöberg (6 November 1866 – 5 October 1950) was a Swedish painter. His work was part of the painting event in the art competition at the 1932 Summer Olympics.
