= Suzanne Muzanne =

French sculptor

- Born: 17 March 1876; Sanvignes, France
- Occupation: Sculptor

Suzanne Muzanne (born 17 March 1876, date of death unknown) was a French sculptor. Her work was part of the sculpture event in the art competition at the 1932 Summer Olympics.
