= Susumu Yamaguchi (painter) =

Japanese painter

- Born: 25 January 1897; Kamiina District, Japan
- Died: 25 November 1983 (aged 86); Ina, Japan
- Occupation: Painter

Susumu Yamaguchi (25 January 1897 – 25 November 1983) was a Japanese painter. His work was part of the painting event in the art competition at the 1932 Summer Olympics.
