= Warren Wheelock =

American sculptor

- Born: January 15, 1880; Webster, Massachusetts, United States
- Died: July 8, 1960 (aged 80); Albuquerque, New Mexico, United States
- Occupation: Sculptor

Warren Wheelock (January 15, 1880 – July 8, 1960) was an American sculptor. His work was part of the sculpture event in the art competition at the 1932 Summer Olympics.
