= Eben Comins =

American painter

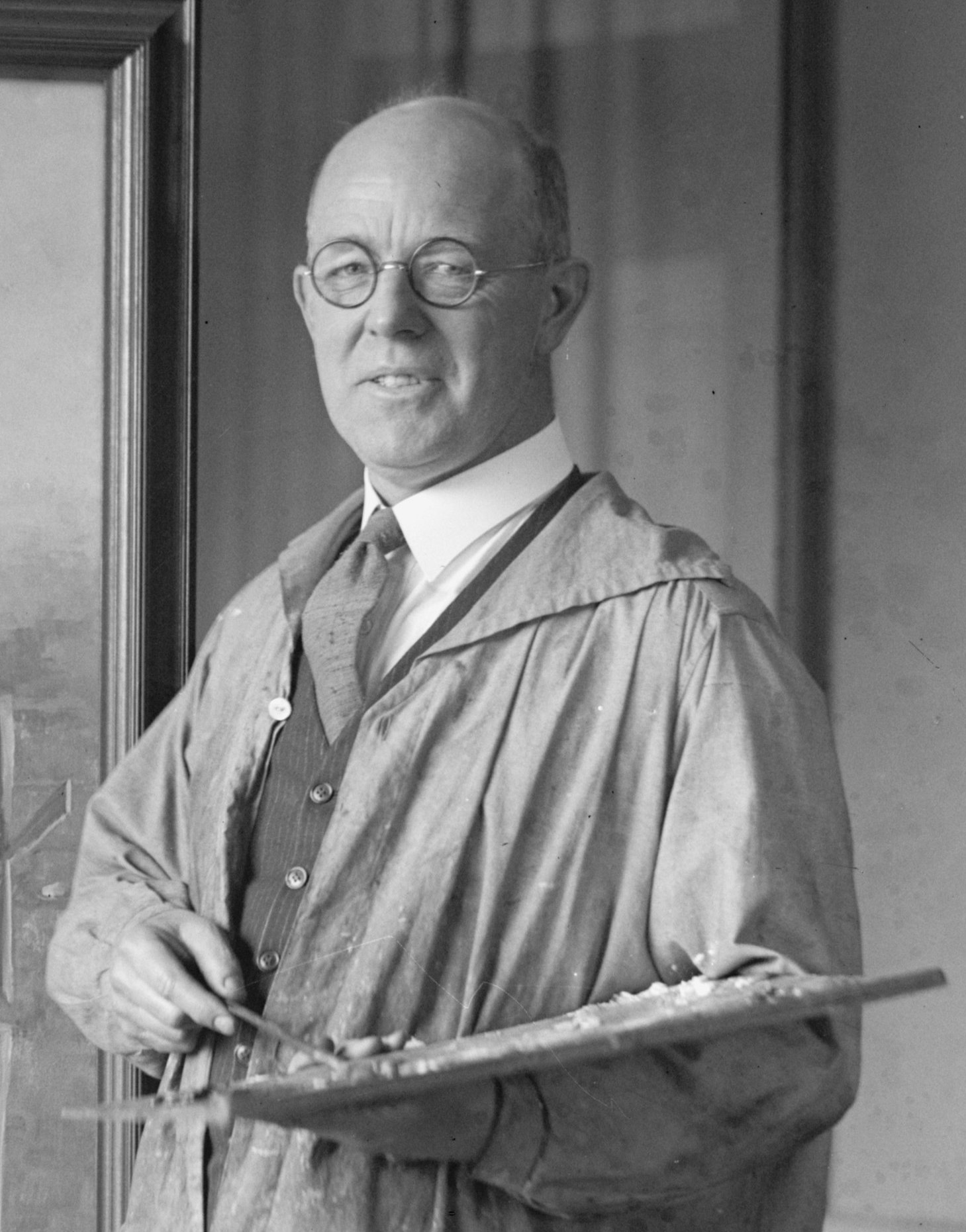
- Eben Comins in 1927
- Born: May 19, 1875; Boston, Massachusetts, United States
- Died: April 13, 1949 (aged 73); Falls Church, Virginia, United States
- Occupation: Painter

Eben Comins (May 19, 1875 – April 13, 1949) was an American painter. His work was part of the painting event in the art competition at the 1932 Summer Olympics.
