= Louis Hechenbleikner =

American painter

- Born: October 29, 1893; Innsbruck, Austria
- Died: August 16, 1983 (aged 89); Kitzbühel, Austria
- Occupation: Painter

Louis Hechenbleikner (October 29, 1893 – August 16, 1983) was an American painter. His work was part of the painting event in the art competition at the 1932 Summer Olympics.
