= Ludwig Waldschmidt =

German painter

- Born: 6 December 1886; Kaiserslautern, Germany
- Died: 1 January 1957 (aged 70); Kaiserslautern, Germany
- Occupation: Painter

Ludwig Waldschmidt (6 December 1886 – 1 January 1957) was a German painter. His work was part of the painting event in the art competition at the 1932 Summer Olympics.
