= Róbert Byssz =

Hungarian painter

- Born: 2 November 1893; Berkenye, Austria-Hungary
- Died: 8 July 1961 (aged 67); Budapest, Hungary
- Occupation: Painter

Róbert Byssz (2 November 1893 – 8 July 1961) was a Hungarian painter. His work was part of the painting event in the art competition at the 1932 Summer Olympics.
