= Samuel Theobald (painter) =

American painter

- Born: October 23, 1872; Baltimore, Maryland, United States
- Died: 1956 (aged 83–84)
- Occupation: Painter

Samuel Theobald (October 23, 1872 – 1956) was an American painter. His work was part of the painting event in the art competition at the 1932 Summer Olympics.
