= Paul Gruson =

German sculptor

- Born: 24 December 1895; Charlottenburg, Germany
- Died: 1969 (aged 73–74)
- Occupation: Sculptor

Paul Gruson (24 December 1895 – 1969) was a German sculptor. His work was part of the sculpture event in the art competition at the 1932 Summer Olympics. Despite his Jewish ancestry, he managed to get the commission to design a monument in honor of the martyrs of the Nazi movement. Once the fact that he was "half-Jew" according to the Nazi racial calculus was discovered, Joseph Goebbels decided to grant him a special dispensation to avoid embarrassment.
