= Paul Morchain =

French painter

- Born: 27 December 1876; Rochefort-sur-Mer, France
- Died: 26 October 1939 (aged 62)
- Occupation: Painter

Paul Morchain (27 December 1876 – 26 October 1939) was a French painter. His work was part of the painting event in the art competition at the 1932 Summer Olympics.
