= Georges Couvreur =

American composer

- Born: March 16, 1894; Mouvaux, France
- Died: June 21, 1957 (aged 63); Philadelphia, Pennsylvania, United States
- Occupation: Composer

Georges Couvreur (March 16, 1894 – June 21, 1957) was an American composer. His work was part of the music event in the art competition at the 1932 Summer Olympics.
