= Gilbert Holiday =

British painter

- Born: 29 January 1879; London, England
- Died: 8 January 1937 (aged 57); Molesey, England
- Occupation: Painter

Gilbert Holiday (29 January 1879 – 8 January 1937) was a British painter. His work was part of the painting event in the art competition at the 1932 Summer Olympics.
