= August Hermann Zeiz =

German writer

- Born: 23 September 1893; Cologne, Germany
- Died: 30 August 1964 (aged 70); Berlin, Germany
- Occupation: Writer

August Hermann Zeiz (23 September 1893 – 30 August 1964) was a German writer who worked under the pseudonyms Jean Barlatier and Georg Fraser. His work was part of the literature event in the art competition at the 1932 Summer Olympics.
