= Terzo Polazzo =

Italian sculptor

- Born: 11 May 1894; Padua, Italy
- Died: 1976 (aged 81–82)
- Occupation: Sculptor

Terzo Polazzo (11 May 1894 – 1976) was an Italian sculptor. His work was part of the sculpture event in the art competition at the 1932 Summer Olympics.
