= Betsy Muus =

Belgian sculptor (1891–1986)

- Born: Elisabeth Amelie Antoinette Auguste Muus; 30 June 1891; Arnhem, Belgium
- Died: 21 October 1986 (aged 95); Arnhem, Belgium
- Occupation: Sculptor

Elisabeth Amelie Antoinette Auguste "Betsy" Muus (30 June 1891 – 21 October 1986) was a Belgian sculptor. Her work was part of the sculpture event in the art competition at the 1932 Summer Olympics.
