= Karel Kopp =

Czech architect

- Born: 25 October 1903; Prague, Austria-Hungary
- Died: 11 August 1956 (aged 52); Prague, Czechoslovakia
- Occupation: Architect

Karel Kopp (25 October 1903 – 11 August 1956) was a Czech architect. His work was part of the architecture event in the art competition at the 1932 Summer Olympics.
