= Shintaro Takeda =

Japanese painter

- Born: 1886; Kitaazumi District, Japan
- Died: 1957 (aged 70–71); Kyoto, Japan
- Occupation: Painter

Shintaro Takeda (1886 – 1957) was a Japanese painter. His work was part of the painting event in the art competition at the 1932 Summer Olympics.
