= Josef Bock (sculptor) =

Austrian sculptor

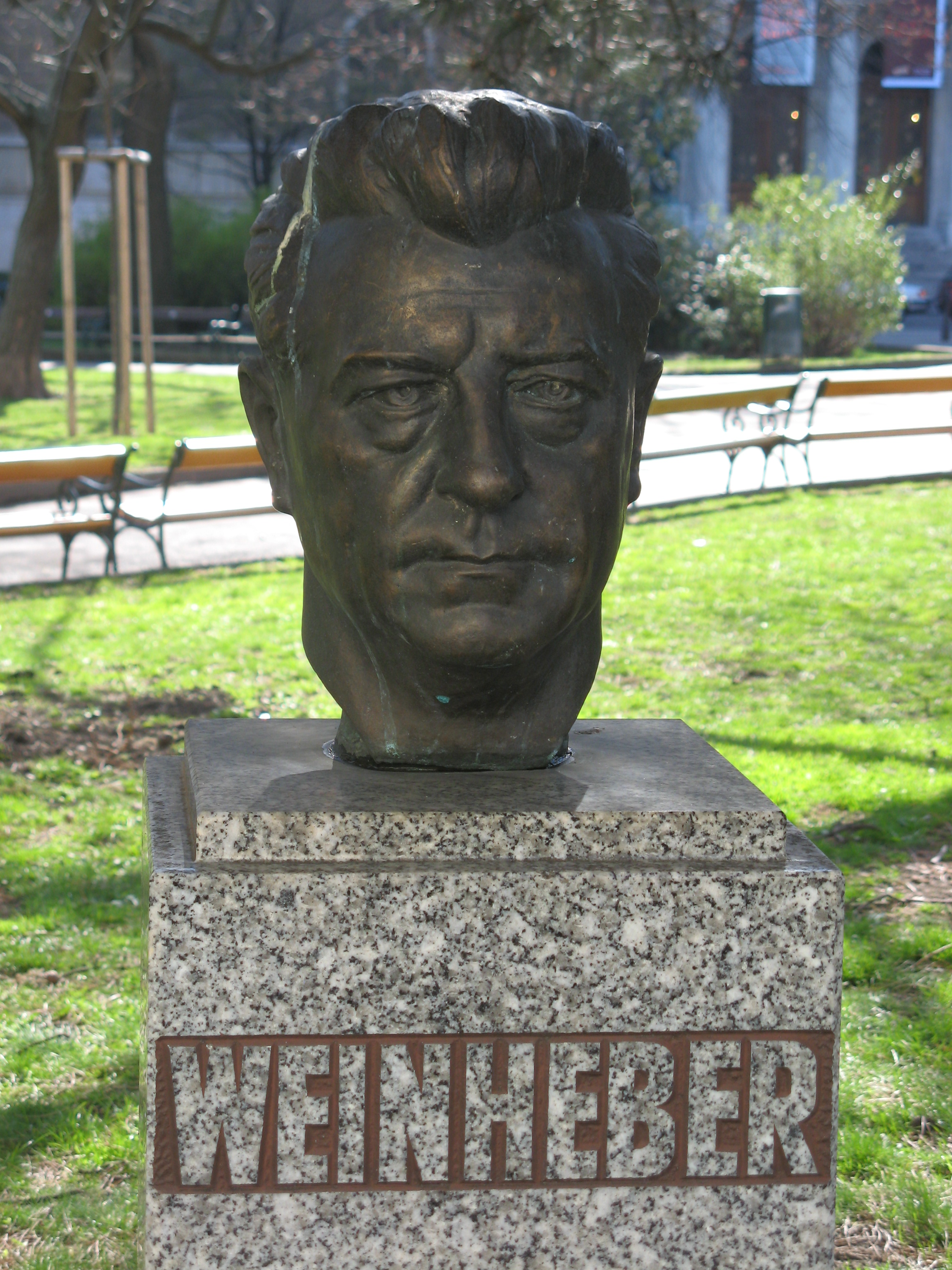
- Born: 11 February 1883; Vienna, Austria-Hungary
- Died: 15 May 1966 (aged 83); Vienna, Austria
- Occupation: Sculptor

Josef Bock (11 February 1883 – 15 May 1966) was an Austrian sculptor. His work was part of the sculpture event in the art competition at the 1932 Summer Olympics.
