= Jadwiga Umińska =

Polish painter

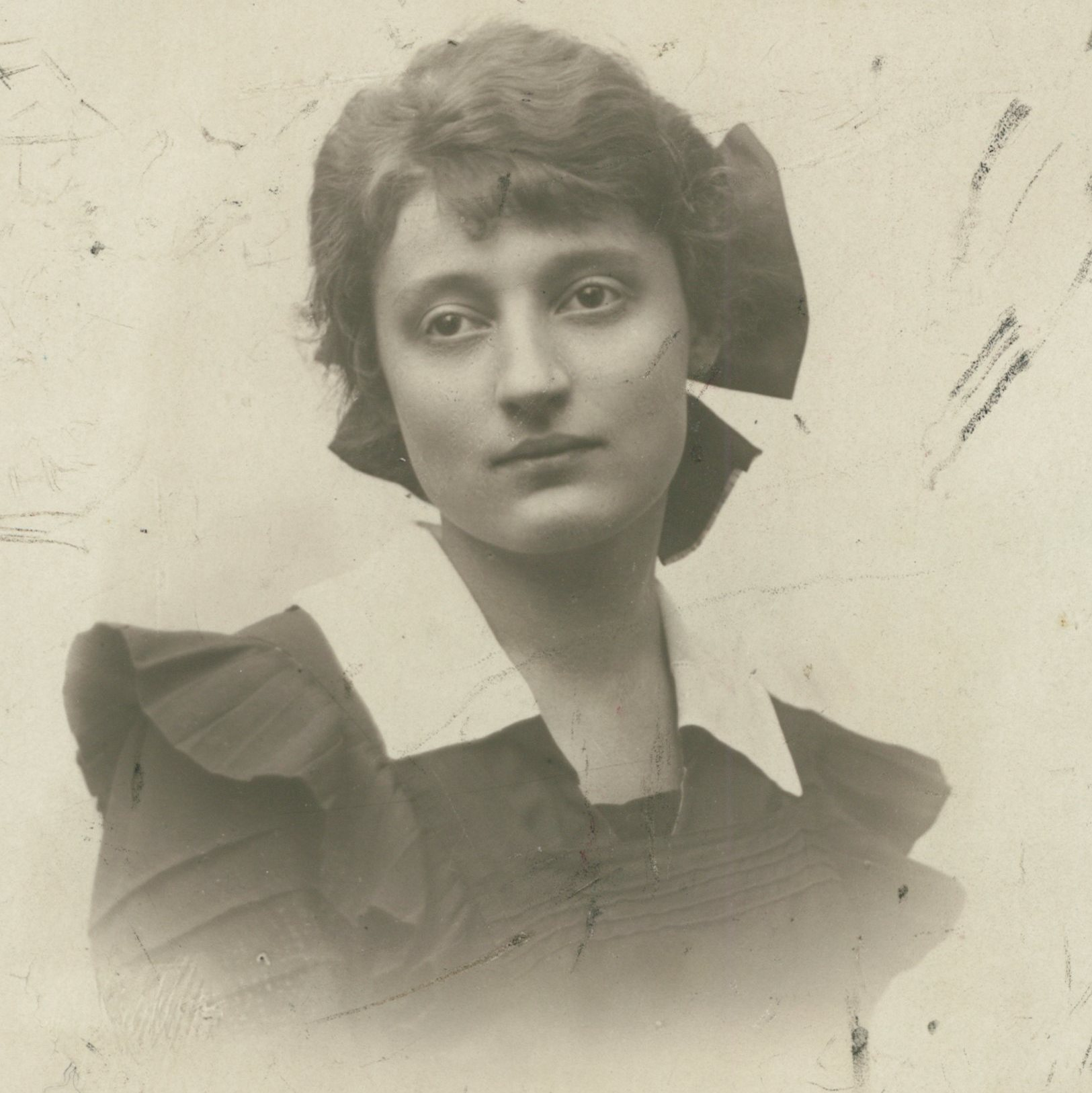
- Umińska ca 1920
- Born: 28 February 1900; Warsaw, Poland
- Died: 10 May 1983 (aged 83)
- Occupation: Painter

Jadwiga Umińska (28 February 1900 – 10 May 1983) was a Polish painter. Her work was part of the painting event in the art competition at the 1932 Summer Olympics.
