= Coenraad Lodewijk Walther Boer =

Dutch composer

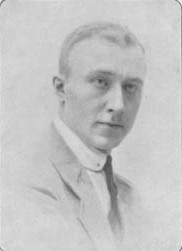
- Born: 2 August 1891; The Hague, Netherlands
- Died: 15 March 1984 (aged 92); Lochem, Netherlands
- Occupation: Composer

Coenraad Lodewijk Walther Boer (2 August 1891 – 15 March 1984) was a Dutch composer. His work was part of the music event in the art competition at the 1932 Summer Olympics.
