= William Byrne (painter) =

American painter (1906–1997)

- Born: April 17, 1906; Butte, Montana, United States
- Died: January 11, 1997 (aged 90); Orange, California, United States
- Occupation: Painter

William Byrne (April 17, 1906 – January 11, 1997) was an American painter. His work was part of the painting event in the art competition at the 1932 Summer Olympics.
