= Oscar Hullgren =

Swedish painter

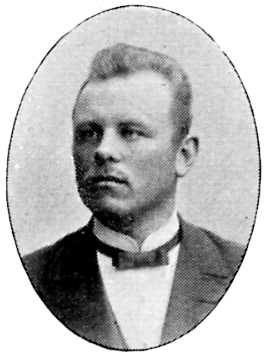
- Oscar Hullgren in 1901
- Born: 10 August 1869; Målilla, Sweden
- Died: 27 April 1948 (aged 78); Stockholm, Sweden
- Occupation: Painter

Oscar Hullgren (10 August 1869 – 27 April 1948) was a Swedish painter. His work was part of the painting event in the art competition at the 1932 Summer Olympics.
