= Maia Wiig-Hansen =

Norwegian artist (1880–1962)

- Born: 2 January 1880; Moss, Norway
- Died: 21 February 1962 (aged 82); Brooklyn, New York, United States
- Occupation: Artist

Maia Wiig-Hansen (2 January 1880 – 21 February 1962) was a Norwegian artist. Her work was part of the art competition at the 1932 Summer Olympics. She exhibited at the Society of Independent Artists in 1938.
