= Henri Pinguenet =

French painter

- Born: 30 September 1889; Paris, France
- Died: 26 May 1972 (aged 82)
- Occupation: Painter

Henri Pinguenet (30 September 1889 – 26 May 1972) was a French painter. His work was part of the painting event in the art competition at the 1932 Summer Olympics.
