= Richard Pfob =

Austrian architect

- Born: 1903
- Died: December 1985 (aged 81–82)
- Occupation: Architect

Richard Pfob (1903 – December 1985) was an Austrian architect. His work was part of the architecture event in the art competition at the 1932 Summer Olympics.
