= Richard Earle (painter) =

American painter

- Born: November 7, 1908; Los Angeles, California, United States
- Died: June 26, 1984 (aged 75); San Diego, California, United States
- Occupation: Painter

Richard Earle (November 7, 1908 – June 26, 1984) was an American painter. His work was part of the painting event in the art competition at the 1932 Summer Olympics.
