= Romano Espinoza =

Peruvian artist

- Born: 18 November 1898; San Mateo District, Huarochirí, Peru
- Died: 1 May 1957 (aged 58); Lima, Peru
- Occupation: Artist

Romano Espinoza (18 November 1898 – 1 May 1957) was a Peruvian artist. His work was part of the art competition at the 1932 Summer Olympics.
