= Hugo Nicholson =

American painter

- Born: December 21, 1898; Kane, Pennsylvania, United States
- Died: August 28, 1972 (aged 73); Lakewood, New York, United States
- Occupation: Painter

Hugo Nicholson (December 21, 1898 – August 28, 1972) was an American painter. His work was part of the painting event in the art competition at the 1932 Summer Olympics.
