= François Clémencin =

French sculptor

- Born: 7 October 1878; Lyon, France
- Died: 6 March 1950 (aged 71); Paris, France
- Occupation: Sculptor

François Clémencin (7 October 1878 – 6 March 1950) was a French sculptor. His work was part of the sculpture event in the art competition at the 1932 Summer Olympics.
