= Frank Ingels =

American sculptor

- Born: January 2, 1886; Tamora, Nebraska, United States
- Died: April 26, 1957 (aged 71); Los Angeles, California, United States
- Occupation: Sculptor

Frank Ingels (January 2, 1886 – April 26, 1957) was an American sculptor. His work was part of the sculpture event in the art competition at the 1932 Summer Olympics.

== Personal life ==
Frank Ingels was born in Tamora, Nebraska on January 2, 1886. He was a pupil of Lorado Taft at the Art Institute of Chicago.
