= Rodney Thomson =

American painter

- Born: October 2, 1878; San Francisco, California, United States
- Died: 1941 (aged 62–63); New York, New York, United States
- Occupation: Painter

Rodney Thomson (October 2, 1878 – 1941) was an American painter. His work was part of the painting event in the art competition at the 1932 Summer Olympics.
