= Edith Magonigle =

American painter

- Born: May 11, 1877; Brooklyn, New York, United States
- Died: August 8, 1949 (aged 72); New York, New York, United States
- Occupation: Painter

Edith Magonigle (May 11, 1877 – August 8, 1949) was an American painter. Her work was part of the painting event in the art competition at the 1932 Summer Olympics.
