= Hanuš Folkmann =

Czech sculptor

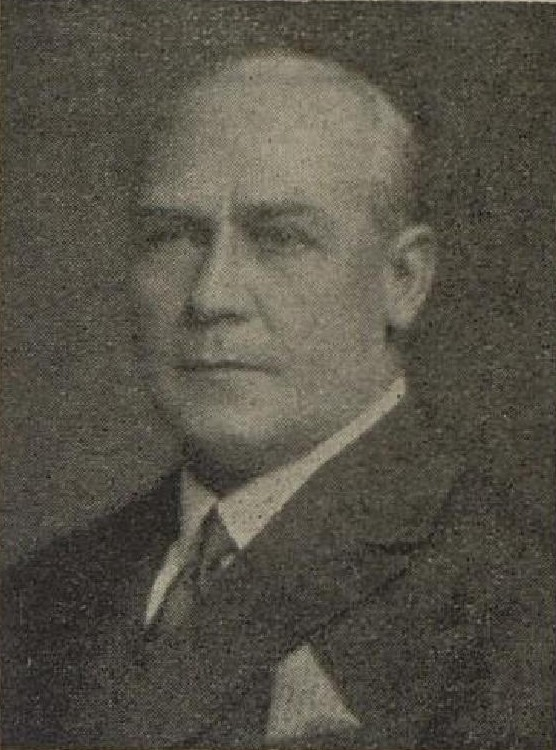
- Born: 30 December 1876; Prague, Bohemia, Austria-Hungary
- Died: 10 May 1936 (aged 59); Prague, Czechoslovakia
- Occupation: Sculptor

Hanuš Folkmann (30 December 1876 – 10 May 1936) was a Czech sculptor. His work was part of the sculpture event in the art competition at the 1932 Summer Olympics.
