= Hugo Liisberg =

Danish sculptor

- Born: 23 July 1896; Copenhagen, Denmark
- Died: 12 April 1958 (aged 61); Hillerød, Denmark
- Occupation: Sculptor

Hugo Liisberg (23 July 1896 – 12 April 1958) was a Danish sculptor. His work was part of the sculpture event in the art competition at the 1932 Summer Olympics.
