= William Schulhoff =

American painter

- Born: March 19, 1898; Romania
- Died: August 2, 1943 (aged 45); Pelham, New York, United States
- Occupation: Painter

William Schulhoff (March 19, 1898 – August 2, 1943) was an American painter. His work was part of the painting event in the art competition at the 1932 Summer Olympics.
