= Hugo Scherzer =

American composer

- Born: July 10, 1889; Świdnica, Germany
- Died: December 24, 1940 (aged 51); Santa Monica, California, United States
- Occupation: Composer

Hugo Scherzer (July 10, 1889 – December 24, 1940) was an American composer. His work was part of the music event in the art competition at the 1932 Summer Olympics. He drowned in the Pacific Ocean off Santa Monica, California in 1940.
