= Frans Laporta =

Belgian architect

- Born: 13 April 1907; Lier, Belgium
- Died: 16 August 2002 (aged 95); Westmalle, Belgium
- Occupation: Architect

Frans Laporta (13 April 1907 – 16 August 2002) was a Belgian architect. His work was part of the architecture event in the art competition at the 1932 Summer Olympics.
