= Achille Porcasi =

American composer

- Born: January 18, 1860; Palermo, Italy
- Died: August 29, 1941 (aged 81); Los Angeles, California, United States
- Occupation: Composer

Achille Porcasi (January 18, 1860 – August 29, 1941) was an American composer. His work was part of the music event in the art competition at the 1932 Summer Olympics.
