= Ronald Gray (painter) =

British painter

- Born: 20 January 1868; London, England
- Died: 16 November 1951 (aged 83); London, England
- Occupation: Painter

Ronald Gray (20 January 1868 – 16 November 1951) was a British painter. His work was part of the painting event in the art competition at the 1932 Summer Olympics.
