= Anshelm Schultzberg =

Swedish painter

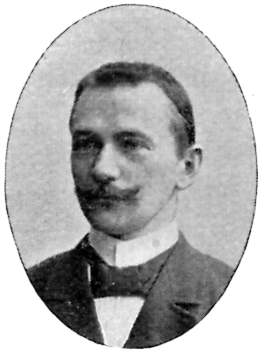
- Anshelm Schultzberg in 1901
- Born: 28 September 1862; Falun, Sweden
- Died: 27 February 1945 (aged 82); Stockholm, Sweden
- Occupation: Painter

Anshelm Schultzberg (28 September 1862 – 27 February 1945) was a Swedish painter. His work was part of the painting event in the art competition at the 1932 Summer Olympics.
