= Felicie Howell =

American painter

- Born: Honolulu, Hawaii, United States
- Died: Boston, Massachusetts, United States
- Occupation: Painter

Felicie Howell, was an American painter. Her work was part of the painting event in the art competition at the 1932 Summer Olympics.

Felicie Waldo Howell was born in Honolulu, Hawaii to Warren Eugene Howell (1869–1943) and Hattie Bushnell Kinner (1876–1925). Her parents were both interested in missionary work for the Seventh-day Adventist Church. After they graduated from Battle Creek College, they went west first to Healdsburg College, and then in 1897 to the Hawaii Mission, where Felicie was born. Her father was the first president of the College of Medical Evangelists, today Loma Linda University, and then their family went overseas as missionaries to Greece (1907–1909). After her parents returned to the Washington, D.C., area, in 1909, she studied painting at the Corcoran Art School. In 1921 she received the Peabody Prize from the Art Institute of Chicago and a silver medal from the Society of American Artists.

Her work is in the collections of the National Gallery, Smithsonian Institution and Corcoran Gallery of Art in Washington, D.C., and in New York City at the National Arts Club and Metropolitan Museum of Art.
