= Hans Pape =

German painter

- Born: 1 October 1894; Hamburg, Germany
- Died: 30 November 1970 (aged 76); Münster, Germany
- Occupation: Painter

Hans Pape (1 October 1894 – 30 November 1970) was a German painter. His work was part of the painting event in the art competition at the 1932 Summer Olympics. He trained and worked in Münster.
