= Julio Berrocal =

Peruvian artist

- Born: 22 May 1897; Ica, Peru
- Died: 11 August 1991 (aged 94); Lima, Peru
- Occupation: Artist

Julio Berrocal (22 May 1897 – 11 August 1991) was a Peruvian artist. His work was part of the art competition at the 1932 Summer Olympics.
