= Tensen Ogyu =

Japanese painter

- Born: 28 April 1882; Nihonmatsu, Japan
- Died: 9 October 1947 (aged 65)
- Occupation: Painter

Tensen Ogyu (28 April 1882 – 9 October 1947) was a Japanese painter. His work was part of the painting event in the art competition at the 1932 Summer Olympics.
