= Ernst Balser =

German architect

- Born: 21 August 1893; Neu-Isenburg, Germany
- Died: 20 March 1964 (aged 70); Frankfurt, Germany
- Occupation: Architect

Ernst Balser (21 August 1893 – 20 March 1964) was a German architect. His work was part of the architecture event in the art competition at the 1932 Summer Olympics.
