= Joachim Hellgrewe =

German painter

- Born: 31 December 1887; Berlin, Germany
- Died: 30 March 1956 (aged 68); Bad Langensalza, Germany
- Occupation: Painter

Joachim Hellgrewe (31 December 1887 – 30 March 1956) was a German painter. His work was part of the painting event in the art competition at the 1932 Summer Olympics.
