= John W. Dunn (painter) =

American painter

- Born: April 5, 1891; Washington, D.C., United States
- Died: April 7, 1975 (aged 84); Washington, D.C., United States
- Occupation: Painter

John W. Dunn (April 5, 1891 – April 7, 1975) was an American painter. His work was part of the painting event in the art competition at the 1932 Summer Olympics.
