= Charles Ridgway =

American composer

- Born: March 14, 1878; New York, New York, United States
- Died: April 15, 1946 (aged 68); Los Angeles, California, United States
- Occupation: Composer

Charles Ridgway (March 14, 1878 – April 15, 1946) was an American composer. His work was part of the music event in the art competition at the 1932 Summer Olympics.
