= Jess Lawson Peacey =

British sculptor

- Born: 18 February 1885; Edinburgh, Scotland
- Died: 29 June 1965 (aged 80); San Francisco, California, United States
- Occupation: Sculptor

Jess Lawson Peacey (18 February 1885 – 29 June 1965) was a British sculptor. Her work was part of the sculpture event in the art competition at the 1932 Summer Olympics.
