= Carl Elmberg =

Swedish sculptor

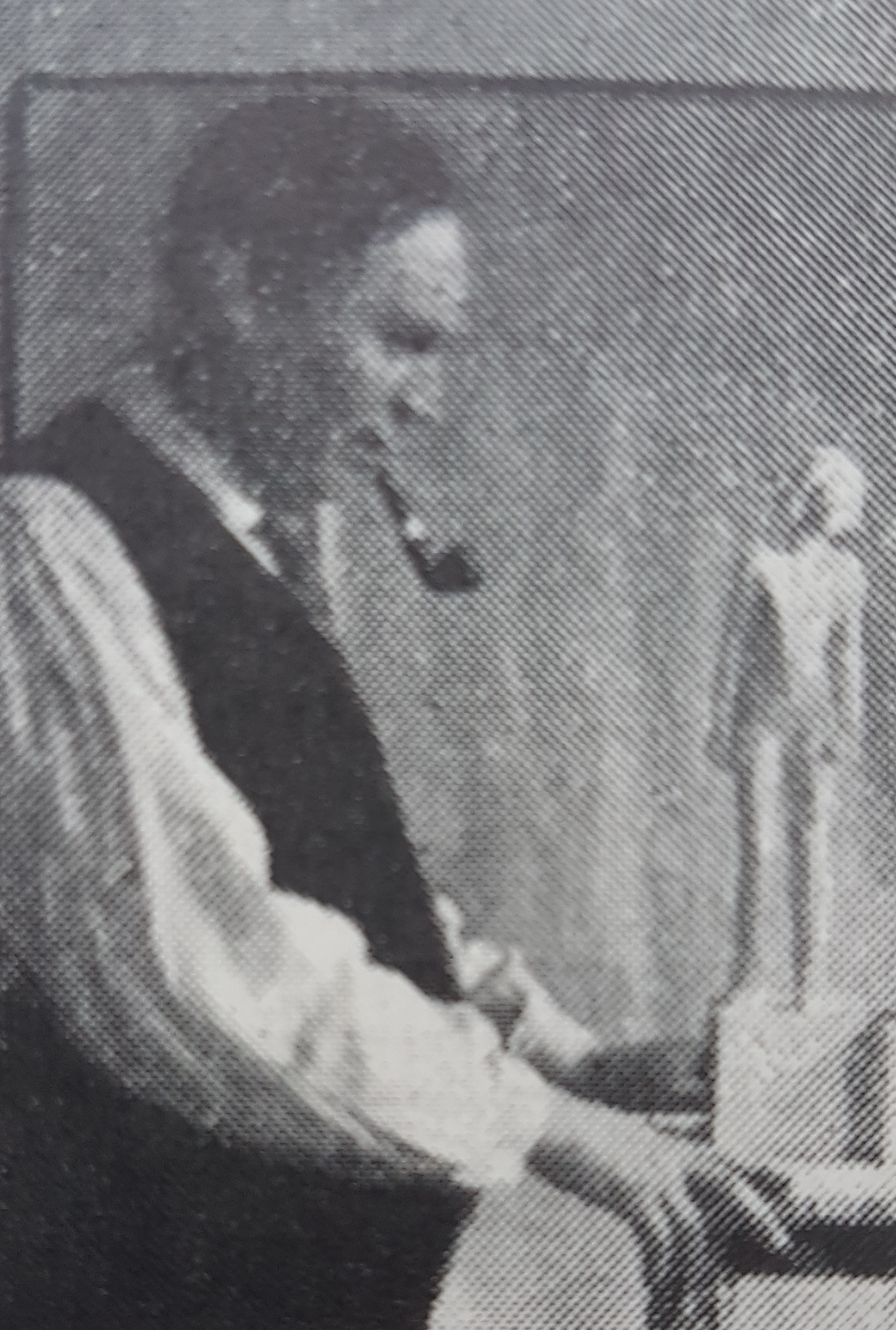
- Born: 16 September 1889; Kalmar, Sweden
- Died: 1 December 1955 (aged 66); Stockholm, Sweden
- Occupation: Sculptor

Carl Elmberg (16 September 1889 – 1 December 1955) was a Swedish sculptor. His work was part of the sculpture event in the art competition at the 1932 Summer Olympics.
