= Louise Nimmo =

American painter

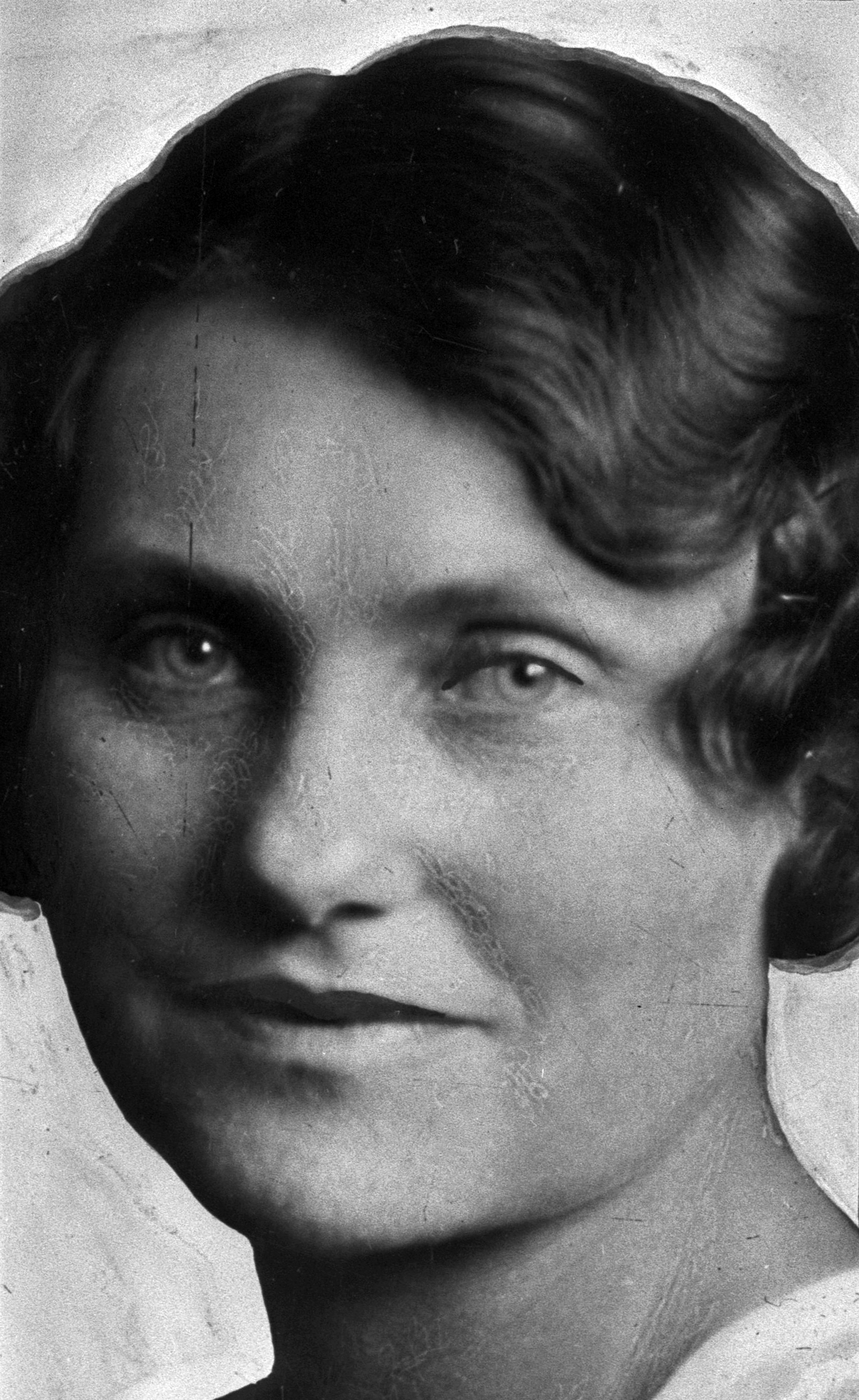
- Nimmo in 1935
- Born: April 9, 1899; Des Moines, Iowa, United States
- Died: April 6, 1959 (aged 59); Ojai, California, United States
- Occupation: Painter

Louise Nimmo (April 9, 1899 – April 6, 1959) was an American painter. Her work was part of the painting event in the art competition at the 1932 Summer Olympics.
