= Otto Schnitzer =

German sculptor

- Born: 8 January 1890; Börtlingen, Germany
- Died: 16 May 1975 (aged 85); Berlin, Germany
- Occupation: Sculptor

Otto Schnitzer (8 January 1890 – 16 May 1975) was a German sculptor. His work was part of the sculpture event in the art competition at the 1932 Summer Olympics.
