= Maurice Ehlinger =

French painter (1896–1981)

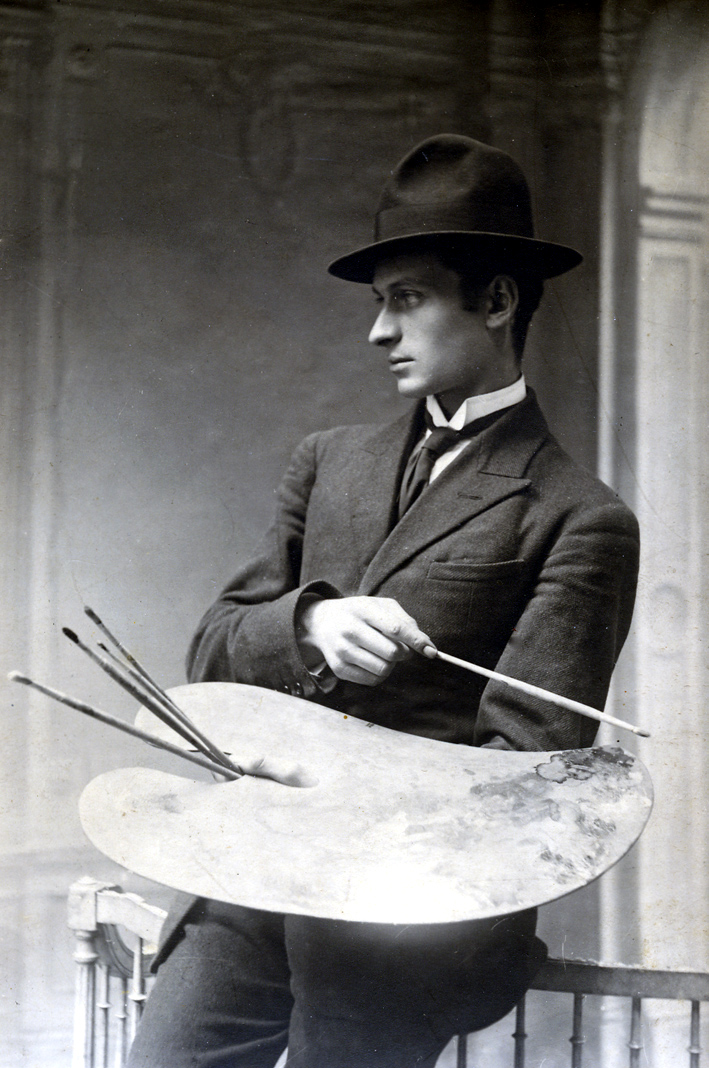
- Born: 25 September 1896; Champagney, France
- Died: 26 August 1981 (aged 84); Belfort, France
- Occupation: Painter

Maurice Ehlinger (25 September 1896 – 26 August 1981) was a French painter. His work was part of the painting event in the art competition at the 1932 Summer Olympics.
