= Kees Roovers =

Dutch painter

- Born: 6 March 1890; Rotterdam, Netherlands
- Died: 26 February 1978 (aged 87); The Hague, Netherlands
- Occupation: Painter

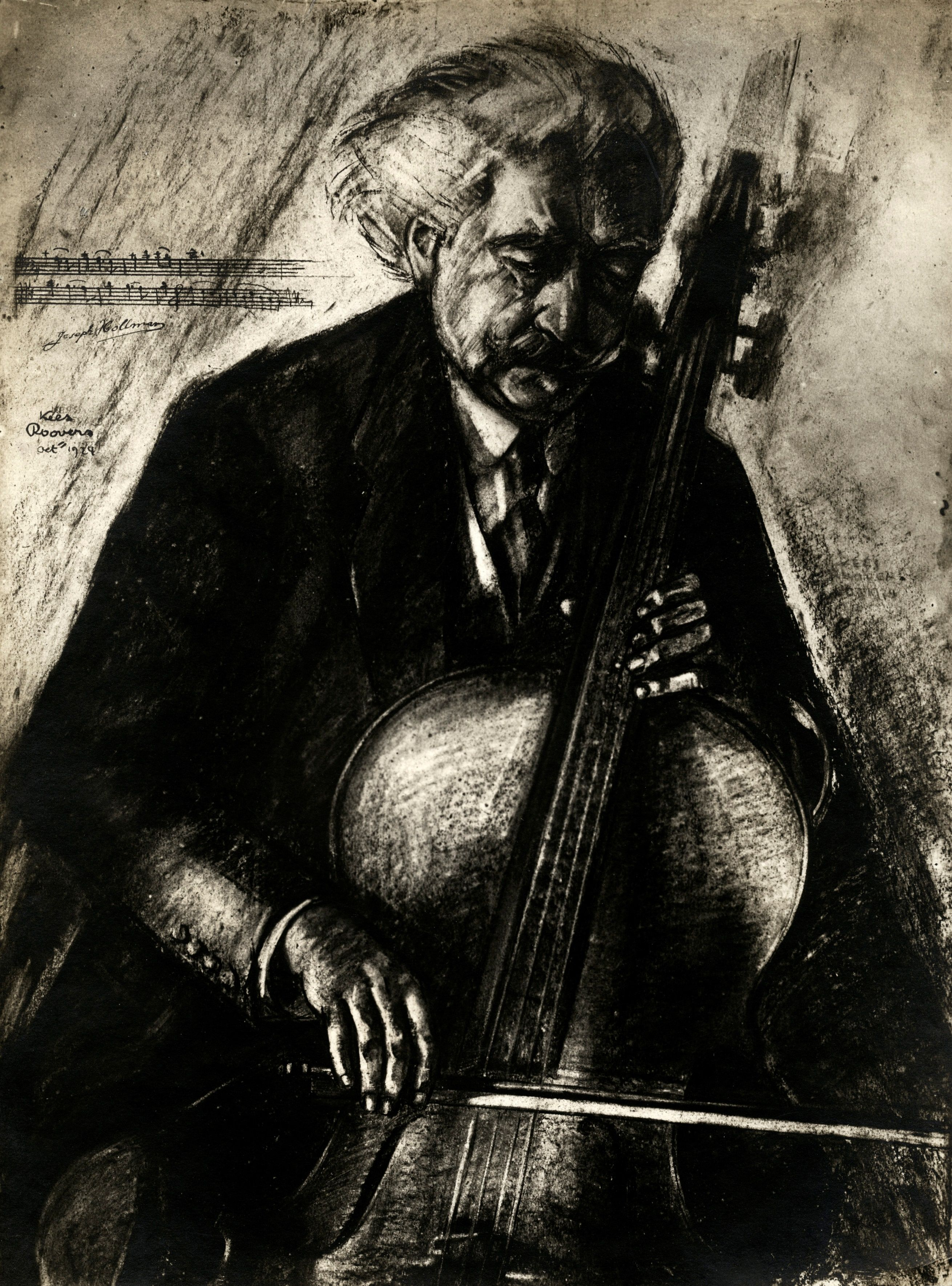
Portrait of Joseph Hollman by Kees Roovers (1924)

Kees Roovers (6 March 1890 – 26 February 1978) was a Dutch painter. His work was part of the painting event in the art competition at the 1932 Summer Olympics.
