= Miklós Hodászy =

Hungarian writer

- Born: 18 October 1890; Budapest, Austria-Hungary
- Died: 9 December 1975 (aged 85); Budapest, Hungary
- Occupation: Writer

Miklós Hodászy (18 October 1890 – 9 December 1975) was a Hungarian writer. His work was part of the literature event in the art competition at the 1932 Summer Olympics.
