= Georges Dantu =

French painter

- Born: 10 April 1867; Paris, France
- Died: 23 April 1948 (aged 81)
- Occupation: Painter

Georges Dantu (10 April 1867 – 23 April 1948) was a French painter. His work was part of the painting event in the art competition at the 1932 Summer Olympics.
