= Yuhachi Ikeda =

Japanese sculptor

- Born: 28 August 1886; Kagawa, Japan
- Died: 31 March 1963 (aged 76); Nerima, Japan
- Occupation: Sculptor

Yuhachi Ikeda (28 August 1886 – 31 March 1963) was a Japanese sculptor. His work was part of the art competitions at the 1932 Summer Olympics and the 1936 Summer Olympics.
