= Johs Elvestad =

Norwegian composer

- Born: 17 May 1899; Oslo, Norway
- Died: 5 November 1989 (aged 90); Fåvang, Norway
- Occupation: Composer

Johs Elvestad (17 May 1899 – 5 November 1989) was a Norwegian composer. His work was part of the music event in the art competition at the 1932 Summer Olympics.
