= Wiktor Podoski =

Polish painter

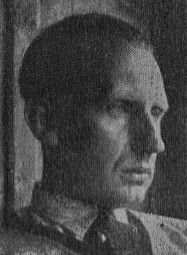
- Born: 24 May 1901; Ternopil, Ukraine
- Died: 10 July 1970 (aged 69); Los Angeles, California, United States
- Occupation: Painter

Wiktor Podoski (24 May 1901 – 10 July 1970) was a Polish painter. His work was part of the art competitions at the 1932 Summer Olympics and the 1936 Summer Olympics. He was not prolific, but his work is well-regarded.
