= Ferdinand Balcárek =

Czech architect

- Born: 21 August 1904; Prague, Austria-Hungary
- Died: 16 January 1975 (aged 70); Prague, Czechoslovakia
- Occupation: Architect

Ferdinand Balcárek (21 August 1904 – 16 January 1975) was a Czech architect. His work was part of the art competitions at the 1932 Summer Olympics and the 1948 Summer Olympics.
