= Louis Malespina =

French painter

- Born: 21 June 1874; Saint-Nicolas-de-Port, France
- Died: 16 August 1949 (aged 75); Paris, France
- Occupation: Painter

Louis Malespina (21 June 1874 – 16 August 1949) was a French painter. His work was part of the art competitions at the 1928 Summer Olympics and the 1932 Summer Olympics.
