= Olda Žák =

Czech sculptor

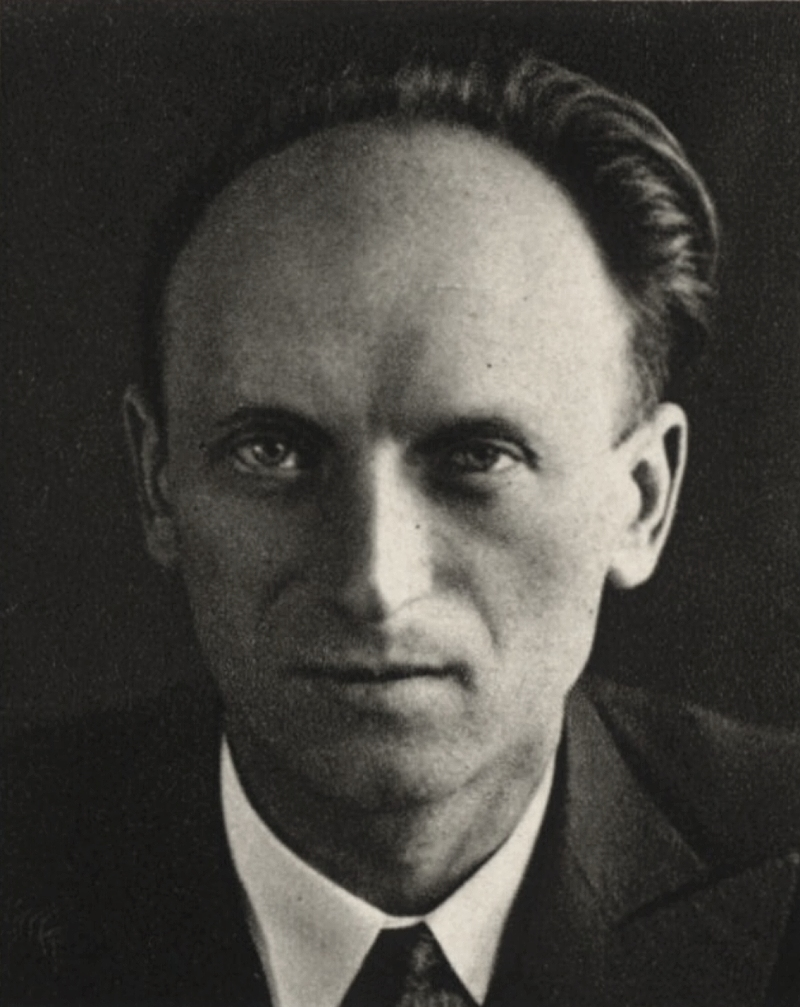
- Born: 3 November 1900; Prague, Austria-Hungary
- Died: 21 December 1983 (aged 83); Železný Brod, Czechoslovakia
- Occupation: Sculptor

Olda Žák (3 November 1900 – 21 December 1983) was a Czech sculptor. His work was part of the art competitions at the 1932 Summer Olympics and the 1936 Summer Olympics.
