= Ottorino Mancioli =

Italian painter

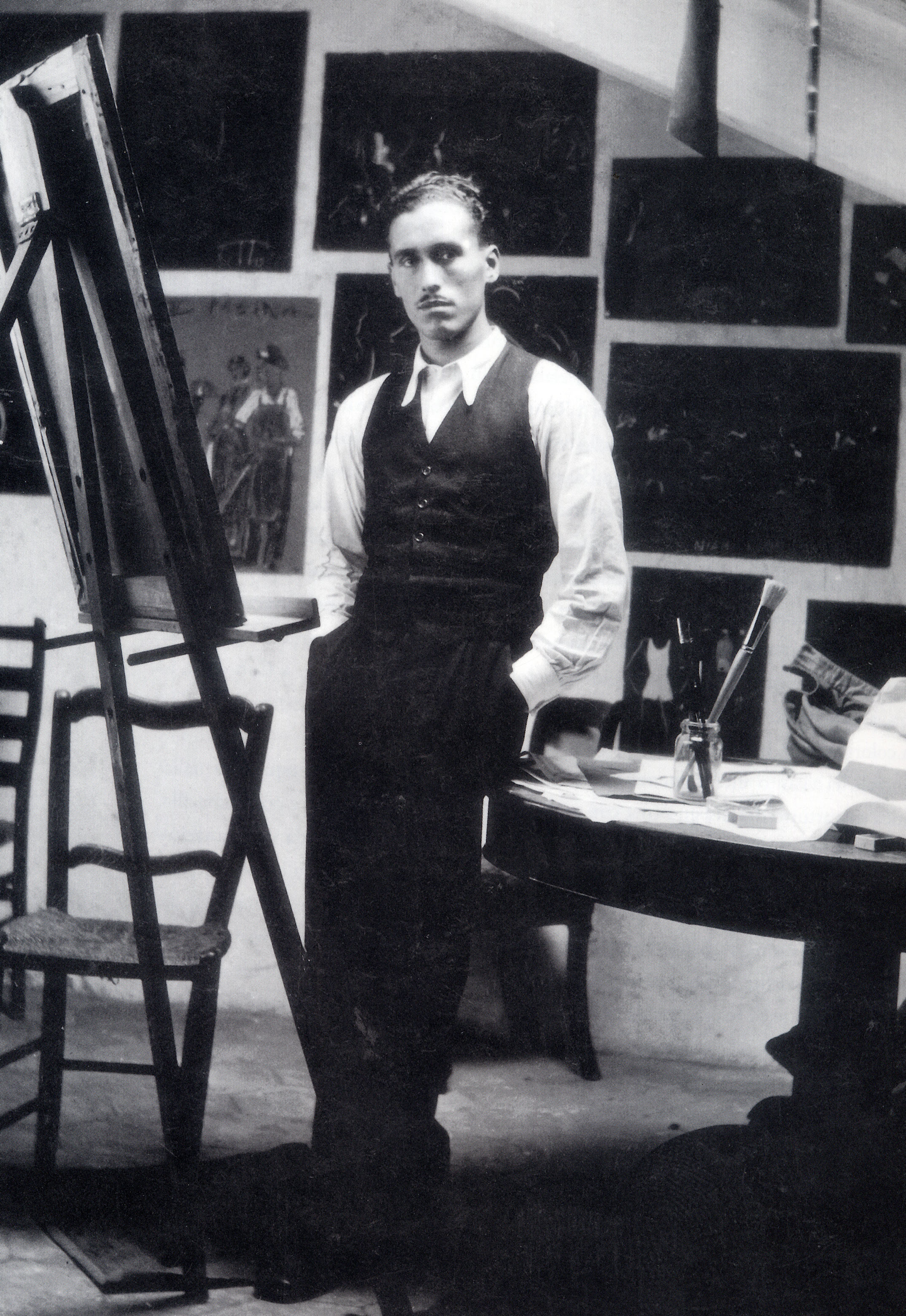
- Born: 26 April 1908; Rome, Italy
- Died: 21 March 1990 (aged 81); Jesi, Italy
- Occupation: Painter

Ottorino Mancioli (26 April 1908 – 21 March 1990) was an Italian painter. His work was part of the art competitions at the 1932 Summer Olympics and the 1936 Summer Olympics.
