= Gordon Stevenson (painter) =

American painter

- Born: February 28, 1892; Chicago, Illinois, United States
- Died: February 1984; Garrison, New York, United States
- Occupation: Painter

Gordon Stevenson (February 28, 1892 – February 1984) was an American painter. His work was part of the art competitions at the 1932 Summer Olympics and the 1936 Summer Olympics.
