= Ludwig Angerer (painter) =

German painter

- Born: 1 July 1891; Thalheim bei Wels, Austria-Hungary
- Died: 1948 (aged 56–57)
- Occupation: Painter

Ludwig Angerer (1 July 1891 – 1948) was a German painter. His work was part of the art competitions at the 1932 Summer Olympics and the 1936 Summer Olympics.
