= Julius Engelhard =

German painter

- Born: 18 July 1883; Binjai, Dutch East Indies
- Died: 13 December 1964 (aged 81); Munich, Germany
- Occupation: Painter

Julius Engelhard (18 July 1883 – 13 December 1964) was a German painter. His work was part of the art competitions at the 1932 Summer Olympics and the 1936 Summer Olympics.
