= Cycling at the 1932 Summer Olympics =

Cycling at the Games of the X Olympiad
- Venues: Los Angeles and surrounding area Rose Bowl
- Date: August 1 –3, 1932
- Competitors: 66 from 13 nations

The cycling competition at the 1932 Summer Olympics in Los Angeles consisted of two road cycling events and four track cycling events. The program of events was unchanged from the previous Games.

== Medal summary ==
=== Road cycling ===
Games	Gold	Silver	Bronze
Individual time trial	Attilio Pavesi; Italy	Guglielmo Segato; Italy	Bernhard Britz; Sweden
Team time trial	Italy; Giuseppe Olmo; Attilio Pavesi; Guglielmo Segato	Denmark; Henry Hansen; Leo Nielsen; Frode Sørensen	Sweden; Arne Berg; Bernhard Britz; Sven Höglund

=== Track cycling ===
Games	Gold	Silver	Bronze
Pursuit, team	Italy; Paolo Pedretti; Nino Borsari; Marco Cimatti; Alberto Ghilardi	France; Henri Mouillefarine; Paul Chocque; Amédée Fournier; René Legrèves	Great Britain; Frank Southall; William Harvell; Charles Holland; Ernest Johnson
Sprint	Jacobus van Egmond; Netherlands	Louis Chaillot; France	Bruno Pellizzari; Italy
Tandem	Louis Chaillot and Maurice Perrin (FRA)	Ernest Chambers and Stanley Chambers (GBR)	Harald Christensen and Willy Gervin (DEN)
1000 m time trial	Dunc Gray; Australia	Jacobus van Egmond; Netherlands	Charles Rampelberg; France

== Participating nations ==
66 cyclists from 13 nations competed.

- Australia (1)
- Canada (7)
- Denmark (6)
- France (8)
- Great Britain (7)
- Germany (4)
- Hungary (1)

- Italy (10)
- Mexico (3)
- Netherlands (2)
- New Zealand (1)
- Sweden (4)
- United States (12)

== Medal table ==
Rank	Nation	Gold	Silver	Bronze	Total
1	Italy	3	1	1	5
2	France	1	2	1	4
3	Netherlands	1	1	0	2
4	Australia	1	0	0	1
5	Denmark	0	1	1	2
5	Great Britain	0	1	1	2
7	Sweden	0	0	2	2
Totals (7 entries)		6	6	6	18
