= Denmark at the 1932 Summer Olympics =

- IOC code: DEN
- NOC: Danish Olympic Committee

in Los Angeles
- Competitors: 43 in 9 sports
- Flag bearer: Axel Bloch
- Medals Ranked 20th: Gold 0 Silver 3 Bronze 3 Total 6

Summer Olympics appearances (overview)
- 1896; 1900; 1904; 1908; 1912; 1920; 1924; 1928; 1932; 1936; 1948; 1952; 1956; 1960; 1964; 1968; 1972; 1976; 1980; 1984; 1988; 1992; 1996; 2000; 2004; 2008; 2012; 2016; 2020; 2024

Other related appearances
- 1906 Intercalated Games

Denmark competed at the 1932 Summer Olympics in Los Angeles, United States. 43 competitors, 35 men and 8 women, took part in 34 events in 9 sports.

== Medalists ==
=== Silver ===
- Henry Hansen, Leo Nielsen, and Frode Sørensen — Cycling, Men's Team Road Race
- Svend Olsen — Weightlifting, Men's Light Heavyweight
- Abraham Kurland — Wrestling, Men's Greco-Roman Lightweight

=== Bronze ===
- Peter Jørgensen — Boxing, Men's Light Heavyweight
- Harald Christensen and Willy Gervin — Cycling, Men's 2.000m Tandem
- Else Jacobsen — Swimming, Women's 200m Breaststroke

== Cycling ==
Six cyclists, all men, represented Denmark in 1932.

Individual road race

- Frode Sørensen
- Leo Nielsen
- Henry Hansen
- Gunnar Andersen

Team road race

- Frode Sørensen
- Leo Nielsen
- Henry Hansen

Sprint

- Willy Gervin

Time trial

- Harald Christensen

Tandem

- Harald Christensen
- Willy Gervin

== Diving ==
Women

Athlete	Event	Final	
Athlete	Event	Points	Rank
Ingrid Larsen	3 m springboard	57.26	8
Ingrid Larsen	10 m platform	31.96	5

== Fencing ==
Seven fencers, four men and three women, represented Denmark in 1932.

Men's foil

- Axel Bloch
- Ivan Osiier
- Erik Kofoed-Hansen

Men's team foil

- Axel Bloch, Aage Leidersdorff, Erik Kofoed-Hansen, Ivan Osiier

Men's épée

- Aage Leidersdorff
- Erik Kofoed-Hansen

Men's team épée

- Axel Bloch, Aage Leidersdorff, Erik Kofoed-Hansen, Ivan Osiier

Men's sabre

- Ivan Osiier
- Axel Bloch
- Aage Leidersdorff

Men's team sabre

- Ivan Osiier, Erik Kofoed-Hansen, Aage Leidersdorff, Axel Bloch

Women's foil

- Gerda Munck
- Grete Olsen
- Inger Klint

== Swimming ==
Women

Athlete	Event	Heat		Semifinal		Final	
Athlete	Event	Time	Rank	Time	Rank	Time	Rank
Lilli Andersen	100 m freestyle	1:11.6	8	Did not advance			
Lilli Andersen	400 m freestyle	6:05.1	10 Q	6:05.5	6	Did not advance	
Else Jacobsen	200 m breaststroke	—N/a		3:12.1	3 Q	3:07.1	3rd place, bronze medalist(s)
