= Modern pentathlon at the 1932 Summer Olympics =

Men's modern pentathlon at the Games of the X Olympiad
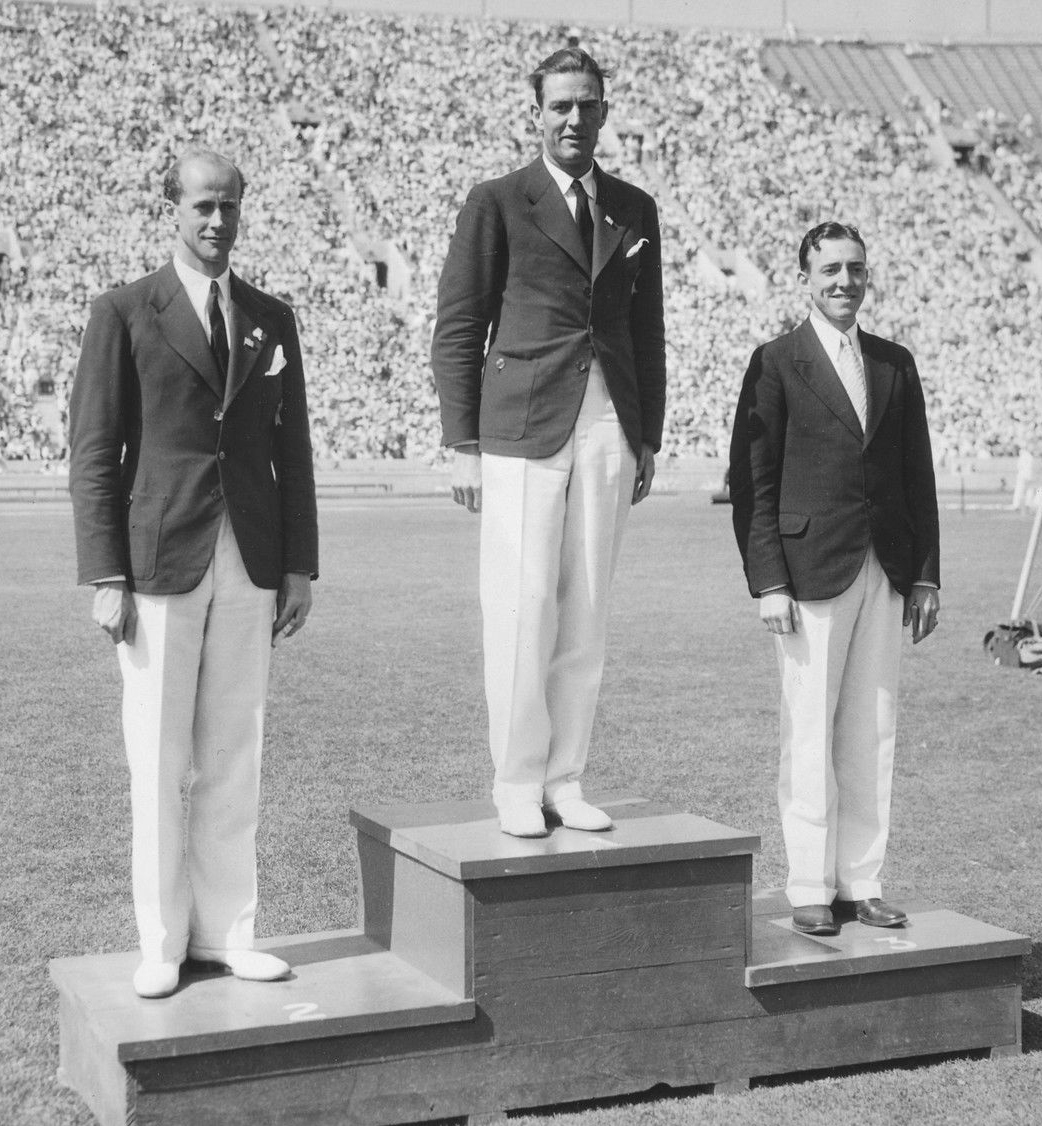
- Left-right: Lindman, Oxenstierna, Mayo
- Dates: August 2–6, 1932
- Competitors: 25 from 10 nations

Medalists
1st place, gold medalist(s)		Johan Gabriel Oxenstierna	Sweden
2nd place, silver medalist(s)		Bo Lindman	Sweden
3rd place, bronze medalist(s)		Richard Mayo	United States

At the 1932 Summer Olympics in Los Angeles, a modern pentathlon event was contested.

== Participating nations ==
A total of 25 athletes from 10 nations competed at the Los Angeles Games:

- France (1)
- Germany (3)
- Great Britain (3)
- Hungary (3)
- Italy (3)
- Mexico (3)
- Netherlands (1)
- Portugal (2)
- Sweden (3)
- United States (3)

== Events ==
=== Individual competition ===
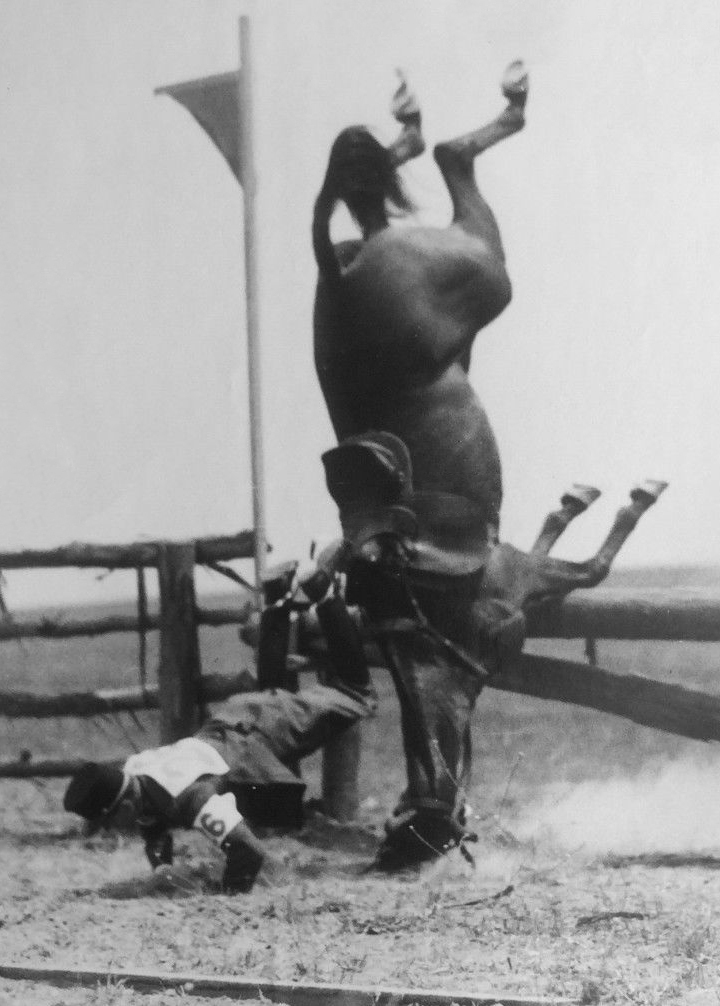
Imre Petneházy crashing in the riding event. Neither the rider nor the horse were injured; Petneházy remounted and finished the race.

Rank	Athlete	Nation	Rid.	Fen.	Sho.	Swi.	Run.	Total
1st place, gold medalist(s)	Johan Gabriel Oxenstierna	Sweden	4	14	2	5	7	32
2nd place, silver medalist(s)	Bo Lindman	Sweden	1	2½	19	9	4	35½
3rd place, bronze medalist(s)	Richard Mayo	United States	2	4½	1	14	17	38½
4	Sven Thofelt	Sweden	15	1	9	1	13	39
5	Willi Remer	Germany	12	10	4	13	8	47
6	Conrad Miersch	Germany	10	10	5	17	6	48
7	Elemér Somfay	Hungary	20	4½	6	12	10	52½
8	Charles Percy Digby Legard	Great Britain	6	18	10	18	1	53
9	Carlo Simonetti	Italy	8	6	3	15	21	53
10	Ivan Duranthon	France	7	7½	18	19	3	54½
11	Brookner Brady	United States	5	12	20	3	16	56
12	Eugenio Pagnini	Italy	9	13	21	2	11½	56½
13	Clayton Mansfield	United States	13	7½	16	6	18	60½
14	Vernon William Barlow	Great Britain	3	22	14	7	15	61
15	Jeffrey McDougall	Great Britain	24	20	12	4	2	62
16	Willem Johannes van Rhijn	Netherlands	19	16	13	10	5	63
17	Helmuth Naudé	Germany	18	10	15	11	9	63
18	Tibor Benkö	Hungary	11	15	11	16	11½	64½
19	Imre Petneházy	Hungary	16	20	7	8	14	65
20	Francesco Pacini	Italy	14	2½	23	23	22	84½
21	Miguel Ortega Casanova	Mexico	24	20	8	24	19	95
22	Rafael Afonso de Sousa	Portugal	21	23	17	21	20	102
23	Sebastião Herédia	Portugal	22	17	24	20	23	106
24	José Morales Morales Mendoza	Mexico	17	24	22	22	24	109
25	Humberto Anguiano	Mexico						DNF
