= Germany at the 1932 Summer Olympics =

- IOC code: GER
- NOC: German Olympic Committee

in Los Angeles, United States 29 July–14 August 1932
- Competitors: 144 (135 men and 9 women) in 15 sports
- Flag bearer: Georg Gehring
- Medals Ranked 9th: Gold 3 Silver 12 Bronze 5 Total 20

Summer Olympics appearances (overview)
- 1896; 1900; 1904; 1908; 1912; 1920–1924; 1928; 1932; 1936; 1948; 1952; 1956–1988; 1992; 1996; 2000; 2004; 2008; 2012; 2016; 2020; 2024

Other related appearances
- 1906 Intercalated Games –––– Saar (1952); United Team of Germany (1956–1964); East Germany (1968–1988); West Germany (1968–1988)

Germany competed at the 1932 Summer Olympics in Los Angeles, United States. 144 competitors, 135 men and 9 women, took part in 67 events in 15 sports.

== Medalists ==
| Medal | Name | Sport | Event | Date |
|---|---|---|---|---|
| Gold | Hans Eller, Horst Hoeck, Walter Meyer, Carlheinz Neumann, Joachim Spremberg | Rowing | Men's coxed four | 13 August |
| Gold | Rudolf Ismayr | Weightlifting | Men's 75 kg | 31 July |
| Gold | Jakob Brendel | Wrestling | Men's Greco-Roman bantamweight | 7 August |
| Silver | Erich Borchmeyer, Friedrich Hendrix, Arthur Jonath, Helmut Körnig | Athletics | Men's 4 × 100 m relay | 7 August |
| Silver | Ellen Braumüller | Athletics | Women's javelin throw | 31 July |
| Silver | Hans Ziglarski | Boxing | Men's bantamweight | 13 August |
| Silver | Josef Schleinkofer | Boxing | Men's featherweight | 13 August |
| Silver | Erich Campe | Boxing | Men's welterweight | 13 August |
| Silver | Herbert Buhtz, Gerhard Boetzelen | Rowing | Men's double sculls | 13 August |
| Silver | Karl Aletter, Walter Flinsch, Ernst Gaber, Hans Maier | Rowing | Men's coxless four | 13 August |
| Silver | Heinrich Hax | Shooting | Men's 25 m rapid fire pistol | 12 August |
| Silver | Germany men's national water polo team: Emil Benecke; Otto Cordes; Hans Eckstein; Fritz Gunst; Erich Rademacher; Joachim Rademacher; Hans Schulze; Heiko Schwartz | Water polo | | August 11 |
| Silver | Hans Wölpert | Weightlifting | Men's 60 kg | 31 July |
| Silver | Wolfgang Ehrl | Wrestling | Men's Greco-Roman featherweight | 7 August |
| Silver | Jean Földeák | Wrestling | Men's Greco-Roman middleweight | 7 August |
| Bronze | Arthur Jonath | Athletics | Men's 100 m | 1 August |
| Bronze | Wolrad Eberle | Athletics | Men's decathlon | 6 August |
| Bronze | Tilly Fleischer | Athletics | Women's javelin throw | 31 July |
| Bronze | Josef Straßberger | Weightlifting | Men's +82.5 kg | 31 July |
| Bronze | Eduard Sperling | Wrestling | Men's Greco-Roman lightweight | 7 August |

== Cycling ==
Four cyclist, all men, represented Germany in 1932.

Individual road race

- Werner Wittig
- Julius Maus
- Hubert Ebner
- Henry Tröndle

Team road race

- Werner Wittig
- Julius Maus
- Hubert Ebner
- Henry Tröndle

== Diving ==
Men

| Athlete | Event | Final | |
| Athlete | Event | Points | Rank |
|---|---|---|---|
| Leo Esser | 3 m springboard | 134.30 | 5 |

Women

| Athlete | Event | Final | |
| Athlete | Event | Points | Rank |
|---|---|---|---|
| Olga Jensch-Jordan | 3 m springboard | 77.60 | 4 |

== Fencing ==
Two fencers, one man and one woman, represented Germany in 1932.

Men's foil

- Erwin Casmir

Men's sabre

- Erwin Casmir

Women's foil

- Helene Mayer

== Modern pentathlon ==
Three male pentathletes represented Germany in 1932.

- Willi Remer
- Konrad Miersch
- Helmuth Naudé

== Shooting ==
One shooter represented Germany in 1932, winning a silver medal in the 25 m pistol event.

25 m rapid fire pistol

- Heinrich Hax

== Swimming ==
Men

| Athlete | Event | Heat | | Semifinal | | Final | |
| Athlete | Event | Time | Rank | Time | Rank | Time | Rank |
|---|---|---|---|---|---|---|---|
| Ernst Küppers | 100 m backstroke | 1:10.2 | 3 QQ | 1:09.8 | 2 QQ | 1:11.3 | 5 |
| Erwin Sietas | 200 m breaststroke | 2:51.0 | 5 QQ | 2:47.6 | 3 QQ | 2:48.0 | 4 |

== Officials ==
- Tom Sullivan, rowing team coach
