= Sweden at the 1932 Summer Olympics =

- IOC code: SWE
- NOC: Swedish Olympic Committee

in Los Angeles
- Competitors: 81 in 12 sports
- Flag bearer: Bo Lindman
- Medals Ranked 4th: Gold 9 Silver 5 Bronze 9 Total 23

Summer Olympics appearances (overview)
- 1896; 1900; 1904; 1908; 1912; 1920; 1924; 1928; 1932; 1936; 1948; 1952; 1956; 1960; 1964; 1968; 1972; 1976; 1980; 1984; 1988; 1992; 1996; 2000; 2004; 2008; 2012; 2016; 2020; 2024

Other related appearances
- 1906 Intercalated Games

Sweden competed at the 1932 Summer Olympics in Los Angeles, United States. 81 competitors, 78 men and 3 women, took part in 51 events in 12 sports.

== Medalists ==
The following Swedish athletes won medals at the games.

Medal	Name	Sport	Event
Gold	Bertil Rönnmark	Shooting	Men's 50 metre rifle, prone
Gold	Johan Gabriel Oxenstierna	Modern pentathlon	Men's individual
Gold	Eric Malmberg	Wrestling (Greco-Roman)	Men's lightweight
Gold	Ivar Johansson	Wrestling (Greco-Roman)	Men's welterweight
Gold	Rudolf Svensson	Wrestling (Greco-Roman)	Men's heavyweight
Gold	Carl Westergren	Wrestling (Greco-Roman)	Men's light heavyweight
Gold	Ivar Johansson	Wrestling (freestyle)	Men's middleweight
Gold	Johan Richthoff	Wrestling (freestyle)	Men's heavyweight
Gold	Tore Holm; Martin Hindorff; Olle Åkerlund; Åke Bergqvist	Sailing	Men's 6 metre class
Silver	Erik Svensson	Athletics	Men's triple jump
Silver	Thure Ahlqvist	Boxing	Men's lightweight
Silver	Bo Lindman	Modern pentathlon	Men's individual
Silver	Thure Sjöstedt	Wrestling (freestyle)	Men's light heavyweight
Silver	Bertil Sandström; Thomas Byström; Gustaf Adolf Boltenstern, Jr.	Equestrian	Team dressage
Bronze	Allan Carlsson	Boxing	Men's featherweight
Bronze	Axel Cadier	Wrestling (Greco-Roman)	Men's middleweight
Bronze	Einar Karlsson	Wrestling (freestyle)	Men's featherweight
Bronze	Gustaf Klarén	Wrestling (freestyle)	Men's lightweight
Bronze	Gunnar Asther; Daniel Sundén-Cullberg	Sailing	Men's Star class
Bronze	Clarence von Rosen, Jr.	Equestrian	Individual jumping
Bronze	Clarence von Rosen, Jr.	Equestrian	Individual eventing
Bronze	Bernhard Britz	Cycling	Men's individual time trial
Bronze	Arne Berg; Bernhard Britz; Sven Höglund	Cycling	Men's team time trial

== Cycling ==
Four cyclists, all men, represented Sweden in 1932.

Individual road race

- Bernhard Britz
- Sven Höglund
- Arne Berg
- Folke Nilsson

Team road race

- Bernhard Britz
- Sven Höglund
- Arne Berg

== Diving ==
Women

Athlete	Event	Final	
Athlete	Event	Points	Rank
Ingeborg Sjöqvist	10 m platform	34.52	4

== Fencing ==
Three fencers, all men, represented Sweden in 1932.

Men's épée

- Stig Lindström
- Bo Lindman
- Sven Thofelt

== Modern pentathlon ==
Three male pentathletes represented Sweden in 1932.

- Johan Oxenstierna
- Bo Lindman
- Sven Thofelt

== Shooting ==
Three shooters represented Sweden in 1932 with Bertil Rönnmark winning a gold medal.

50 m rifle, prone

- Bertil Rönnmark
- Gustaf Andersson
- Karl August Larsson

== Swimming ==
Men

Athlete	Event	Heat		Semifinal		Final	
Athlete	Event	Time	Rank	Time	Rank	Time	Rank
Eskil Lundahl	100 m freestyle	1:06.2	19	Did not advance			
Eskil Lundahl	100 m backstroke	1:16.4	11	Did not advance			
Sigfrid Heyner	200 m breaststroke	3:00.7	15	Did not advance			
