= Great Britain at the 1932 Summer Olympics =

- Flag of the United Kingdom
- IOC code: GBR
- NOC: British Olympic Association

in Los Angeles
- Competitors: 108 in 10 sports
- Flag bearer: Lord Burghley
- Medals Ranked 8th: Gold 4 Silver 7 Bronze 5 Total 16

Summer Olympics appearances (overview)
- 1896; 1900; 1904; 1908; 1912; 1920; 1924; 1928; 1932; 1936; 1948; 1952; 1956; 1960; 1964; 1968; 1972; 1976; 1980; 1984; 1988; 1992; 1996; 2000; 2004; 2008; 2012; 2016; 2020; 2024

Other related appearances
- 1906 Intercalated Games

Great Britain, represented by the British Olympic Association (BOA), competed at the 1932 Summer Olympics in Los Angeles, California, United States. British athletes have competed in every Summer Olympic Games. 108 competitors, 90 men and 18 women, took part in 50 events in 10 sports. British athletes won four gold medals (up from three in 1928), and sixteen medals overall, finishing eighth.

== Medallists ==
Medal	Name	Sport	Event	Date
Gold	Tommy Hampson	Athletics	Men's 800 m	2 August
Gold	Tommy Green	Athletics	Men's 50 km walk	3 August
Gold	Lewis Clive, Hugh Edwards	Rowing	Men's coxless pair	13 August
Gold	John Badcock, Jack Beresford, Hugh Edwards, Rowland George	Rowing	Men's coxless four	13 August
Silver	Jerry Cornes	Athletics	Men's 1500 m	4 August
Silver	Tom Evenson	Athletics	Men's 3000 m steeplechase	2 August
Silver	David Burghley, Tommy Hampson, Godfrey Rampling, Crew Stoneley	Athletics	Men's 4 × 400 m relay	2 August
Silver	Sam Ferris	Athletics	Men's marathon	7 August
Silver	Ernest Chambers, Stanley Chambers	Cycling	Men's tandem	3 August
Silver	Judy Guinness	Fencing	Women's foil	4 August
Silver	George Colin Ratsey, Peter Jaffe	Sailing	Star class	12 August
Bronze	Don Finlay	Athletics	Men's 110 m hurdles	3 August
Bronze	Nellie Halstead, Eileen Hiscock, Gwendoline Porter, Violet Webb	Athletics	Women's 4 × 100 m relay	7 August
Bronze	William Harvell, Charles Holland, Ernest Johnson, Frank Southall	Cycling	Men's team pursuit	2 August
Bronze	Valerie Davies	Swimming	Women's 100 m backstroke	11 August
Bronze	Joyce Cooper, Valerie Davies, Edna Hughes, Helen Varcoe	Swimming	Women's 4 × 100 m freestyle relay	12 August

== Cycling ==
Seven cyclists, all men, represented Great Britain in 1932.

Individual road race

- Frank Southall
- Charles Holland
- Stanley Butler
- William Harvell

Team road race

- Frank Southall
- Charles Holland
- Stanley Butler

Sprint

- Ernest Chambers

Time trial

- William Harvell

Tandem

- Ernest Chambers
- Stanley Chambers

Team pursuit

- Ernest Johnson
- William Harvell
- Frank Southall
- Charles Holland

== Fencing ==
Three fencers, one man and two women, represented Great Britain in 1932.

Men's foil

- John Emrys Lloyd - 6th

Women's foil

- Judy Guinness - 2nd
- Peggy Butler - 10th

== Modern pentathlon ==
Three male pentathletes represented Great Britain in 1932.

- Percy Legard
- Vernon Barlow
- Jeffrey MacDougall

== Rowing ==
- Single scull - Dick Southwood - Fourth
- Coxless pair - Lewis Clive, Hugh Edwards - Gold
- Coxless four - John Badcock, Jack Beresford, Hugh Edwards, and Rowland George - Gold
- Eight - Tom Askwith, D Haig-Thomas, C J S Sergel, D H E McCowen, K M Payne, H R N Rickett, W A T Sambell, L Luxton, J M Ranking - Fourth

== Swimming ==
Men

Athlete	Event	Heat		Semifinal		Final	
Athlete	Event	Time	Rank	Time	Rank	Time	Rank
Mostyn Ffrench-Williams	100 m freestyle	1:05.9	18	Did not advance			
Reginald Sutton	100 m freestyle	1:02.9	=13	Did not advance			
Joseph Whiteside	100 m freestyle	1:04.7	16	Did not advance			
Bob Leivers	400 m freestyle	5:14.6	13	Did not advance			
Norman Wainwright	400 m freestyle	5:12.0	12	Did not advance			
Willie Francis	100 m backstroke	1:12.9	6	Did not advance			
Joseph Whiteside; Bob Leivers; Reginald Sutton; Mostyn Ffrench-Williams	4 × 200 metre freestyle relay	—				9:45.8	5

Women

Athlete	Event	Heat		Semifinal		Final	
Athlete	Event	Time	Rank	Time	Rank	Time	Rank
Joyce Cooper	100 m freestyle	1:09.0 OR	3 Q	1:09.2	4	Did not advance	
Valerie Davies	100 m freestyle	1:12.7	11	Did not advance			
Edna Hughes	100 m freestyle	1:15.1	13	Did not advance			
Joyce Cooper	400 m freestyle	5:56.7	6 Q	6:00.4	4 Q	5:49.7	4
Joyce Cooper	100 m backstroke	—		1:25.0	8 Q	1:23.4	6
Valerie Davies	100 m backstroke	—		1:22.0	3 Q	1:22.5	3rd place, bronze medalist(s)
Phyllis Harding	100 m backstroke	—		1:22.6	5 q	1:22.6	4
Margery Hinton	200 m breaststroke	—		3:13.5	4 Q	3:11.7	4
Cecelia Wolstenholme	200 m breaststroke	—		3:24.5	8	Did not advance	
Valerie Davies; Helen Varcoe; Joyce Cooper; Edna Hughes	4 × 100 metre freestyle relay	—				4:52.4	3rd place, bronze medalist(s)
