= Cycling at the 1932 Summer Olympics – Men's sprint =

Men's sprint at the Games of the X Olympiad
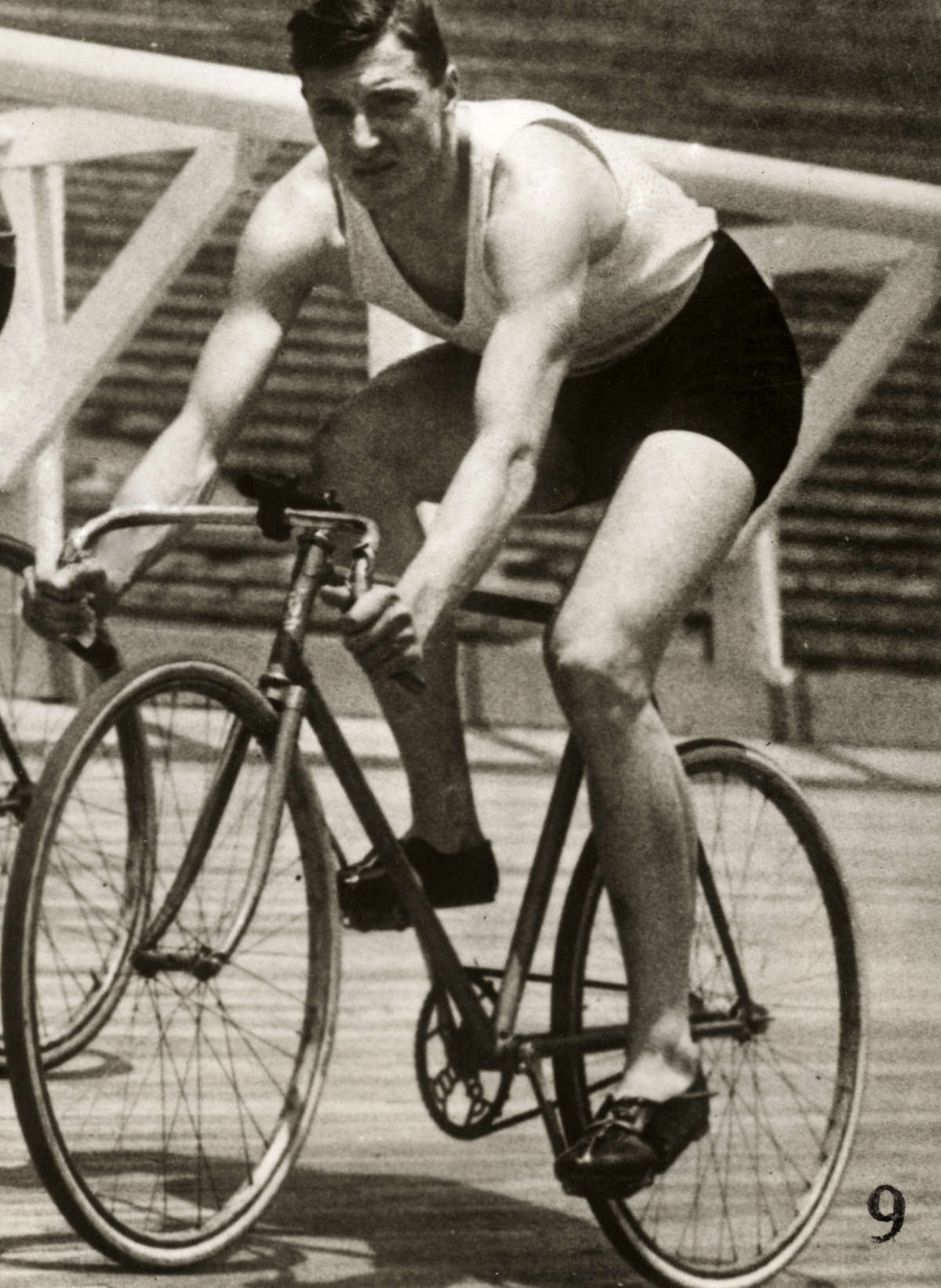
- Jacobus van Egmond
- Venue: Rose Bowl, Pasadena
- Dates: August 1 and 3, 1932
- Competitors: 9 from 9 nations

Medalists
1st place, gold medalist(s)		Jacobus van Egmond; Netherlands
2nd place, silver medalist(s)		Louis Chaillot; France
3rd place, bronze medalist(s)		Bruno Pellizzari; Italy

The men's sprint cycling event at the 1932 Summer Olympics took place on August 1 and 3. The format was a sprint of 1000 metres. There were nine competitors from nine nations, with each nation limited to one cyclist. The event was won by Jacobus van Egmond of the Netherlands, the nation's second victory in the men's sprint. It was the fourth consecutive Games that the Netherlands reached the podium in the event. France made the podium for the third consecutive Games, with Louis Chaillot taking silver. Bruno Pellizzari gave Italy its first men's sprint medal with his bronze.

== Background ==
This was the seventh appearance of the event, which has been held at every Summer Olympics except 1904 and 1912. None of the semifinalists from 1928 returned. The small field included only one rider who had medaled at a World Championship: Bruno Pellizzari of Italy, who finished third in 1930.

Mexico made its debut in the men's sprint. France made its seventh appearance, the only nation to have competed at every appearance of the event.

== Competition format ==
This track cycling event consisted of numerous rounds. Each race involved the riders starting simultaneously and next to each other, from a standing start. Because the early part of races tend to be slow-paced and highly tactical, only the time for the last 200 metres of the one-kilometre race is recorded.

The competition involved four main rounds and a repechage. In the first round, there were three heats of three cyclists each. The top two in each heat advanced directly to the quarterfinals. The third-placed rider in each heat went to a repechage. The repechage was a single heat of three cyclists; the top two advanced to the quarterfinals while the third-place rider was eliminated. Starting in the quarterfinals, each race was one-on-one: the eight quarterfinalists competed in four quarterfinals, with the winner advancing to the semifinals and the loser eliminated. Similarly, the four semifinalists competed in two semifinals. The winners advanced to the final while the losers competed against each other in a bronze medal match.

The 1932 competition introduced the best-of-three format for the final (and only the final). The two finalists competed up to three times, with the first cyclist to win two races being the winner.

== Records ==
The records for the sprint are 200 metre flying time trial records, kept for the qualifying round in later Games as well as for the finish of races.

World record	Unknown	Unknown^{*}	Unknown	Unknown
Olympic record	Thomas Johnson (GBR)	11.8	Antwerp, Belgium	9 August 1920

^{*} World records were not tracked by the UCI until 1954.

No new Olympic record was set during the competition.

== Schedule ==
Date	Time	Round
Monday, 1 August 1932	19:30	Round 1
Tuesday, 2 August 1932	19:30	Repechage; Quarterfinals
Wednesday, 3 August 1932	19:30	Semifinals; Finals

== Results ==
Riders competed in three heats and one repechage; top two riders advanced to quarterfinal.

=== Round 1 ===
==== Heat 1 ====
Rank	Cyclist	Nation	Time	Notes
1	Louis Chaillot	France	13.0	Q
2	Willy Gervin	Denmark		Q
3	Enrique Heredia	Mexico		R

==== Heat 2 ====
Rank	Cyclist	Nation	Time	Notes
1	Jacobus van Egmond	Netherlands	13.0	Q
2	Ernest Chambers	Great Britain		Q
3	Leo Marchiori	Canada		R

==== Heat 3 ====
Rank	Cyclist	Nation	Time	Notes
1	Dunc Gray	Australia	13.2	Q
2	Bruno Pellizzari	Italy		Q
3	Bobby Thomas	United States		R

=== Repechage ===
Rank	Cyclist	Nation	Time	Notes
1	Bobby Thomas	United States	13.1	Q
2	Leo Marchiori	Canada		Q
3	Enrique Heredia	Mexico		

=== Quarterfinals ===
Winner of each of the four heats advanced to the semifinal round.

==== Quarterfinal 1 ====
Rank	Cyclist	Nation	Time	Notes
1	Louis Chaillot	France	12.9	Q
2	Leo Marchiori	Canada		

==== Quarterfinal 2 ====
Rank	Cyclist	Nation	Time	Notes
1	Jacobus van Egmond	Netherlands	12.2	Q
2	Bobby Thomas	United States		

==== Quarterfinal 3 ====
Rank	Cyclist	Nation	Time	Notes
1	Dunc Gray	Australia	12.9	Q
2	Willy Gervin	Denmark		

==== Quarterfinal 4 ====
Pellizzari pushed Chambers out to the edge of the track, resulting in a protest by the British side. The protest was denied and Pellizzari advanced.

Rank	Cyclist	Nation	Time	Notes
1	Bruno Pellizzari	Italy	12.5	Q
2	Ernest Chambers	Great Britain		

=== Semifinal ===
Winner of each of the two heats advanced to the final round.

==== Semifinal 1 ====
Chaillot beat Gray by inches.

Rank	Cyclist	Nation	Time	Notes
1	Louis Chaillot	France	12.8	Q
2	Dunc Gray	Australia		B

==== Semifinal 2 ====
Pellizzari had inside position for the last lap and a half, but van Egmond was able to beat him easily.

Rank	Cyclist	Nation	Time	Notes
1	Jacobus van Egmond	Netherlands	12.5	Q
2	Bruno Pellizzari	Italy		B

=== Finals ===
==== Bronze medal match ====
Gray declined to compete in the bronze medal race, deciding to saving himself for the time trial later in the day (which he won).

Rank	Cyclist	Nation	Time
3rd place, bronze medalist(s)	Bruno Pellizzari	Italy	12.7
—	Dunc Gray	Australia	DNS

==== Final ====
Chaillot won the first race in a very close finish, with some observers believing van Egmond had won. However, the Dutch team did not protest. Van Egmond won by a bike length in the second race to set up a decisive third race. Van Egmond led the entire third race and was able to hold off Chaillot's attack to win by a wheel.

Rank	Cyclist	Nation	Race 1	Race 2	Race 3
1st place, gold medalist(s)	Jacobus van Egmond	Netherlands		12.6	12.6
2nd place, silver medalist(s)	Louis Chaillot	France	12.5		
