= Fencing at the 1932 Summer Olympics – Women's foil =

Olympic fencing event

Women's foil at the Games of the X Olympiad
- Venue: 160th Regiment State Armory
- Dates: 2–4 August 1932
- Competitors: 17 from 11 nations

Medalists
1st place, gold medalist(s)		Ellen Müller-Preis	Austria
2nd place, silver medalist(s)		Judy Guinness Penn-Hughes	Great Britain
3rd place, bronze medalist(s)		Erna Bogen-Bogáti	Hungary

The women's foil was one of seven fencing events on the fencing at the 1932 Summer Olympics programme. It was the third appearance of the event. The competition was held from 2 to 4 August 1932. 17 fencers from 11 nations competed, with one additional fencer entered but withdrawing.

The competition format was pool play round-robin, with bouts to five touches. Not all bouts were played in some pools if not necessary to determine advancement. Bout wins were used for placement, regardless of losses if fencers had competed in a different number of bouts (e.g., 3–3 Gorordo and 3–2 Every were tied in the first round). Touches against was used as the tie-breaker, except for the tie for the first two places in the final which resulted in a fence-off.

== Results ==
=== Round 1 ===
The top 5 finishers in each pool advanced to the final.

==== Pool 1 ====
Rank	Fencer	Nation	Wins	Losses	TS	TR	Notes
1	Jenny Addams	Belgium	6	2	36	23	Q
2	Erna Bogen-Bogáti	Hungary	5	1	27	19	Q
3	Ellen Müller-Preis	Austria	5	1	29	21	Q
4	Grete Olsen	Denmark	5	2	33	22	Q
5	Peggy Butler	Great Britain	4	3	29	21	Q
6	Dorothy Locke	United States	3	5	28	32	
7	Inger Klint	Denmark	2	5	16	31	
8	Joan Archibald	Canada	1	5	16	26	
9	Eugenia Escudero	Mexico	0	6	11	30	

==== Pool 2 ====
Rank	Fencer	Nation	Wins	Losses	TS	TR	Notes
1	Helene Mayer	Germany	7	0	35	6	Q
2	Judy Guinness Penn-Hughes	Great Britain	5	2	32	25	Q
3	Gerda Munck	Denmark	4	3	28	19	Q
4	Marion Lloyd	United States	4	3	25	24	Q
5	Jo de Boer	Netherlands	4	3	27	25	Q
6	Margit Danÿ	Hungary	3	4	24	28	
7	Muriel Guggolz	United States	1	6	14	31	
8	Jeanne Vical	France	0	7	8	35	

=== Final ===
Rank	Fencer	Nation	Wins	Losses	TS	TR	Notes
1st place, gold medalist(s)	Ellen Müller-Preis	Austria	8	1	44	27	Defeated Penn-Hughes 5–3 in fence-off
2nd place, silver medalist(s)	Judy Guinness Penn-Hughes	Great Britain	8	1	43	19	Lost to Müller-Preis 3–5 in fence-off
3rd place, bronze medalist(s)	Erna Bogen-Bogáti	Hungary	7	2	38	30	
4	Jenny Addams	Belgium	6	3	37	29	
5	Helene Mayer	Germany	5	4	38	27	
6	Jo de Boer	Netherlands	5	4	30	35	
7	Gerda Munck	Denmark	2	7	29	39	
8	Grete Olsen	Denmark	2	7	31	42	
8	Marion Lloyd	United States	2	7	26	42	
10	Peggy Butler	Great Britain	0	9	19	45	
