= Cycling at the 1932 Summer Olympics – Men's individual time trial =

Cycling – Men's individual time trial at the Games of the X Olympiad
- Venue: Moorpark-Roosevelt Highway (Oxnard)-Santa Monica
- Dates: August 4, 1932
- Competitors: 35 from 11 nations

Medalists
1st place, gold medalist(s)		Attilio Pavesi; Italy
2nd place, silver medalist(s)		Guglielmo Segato; Italy
3rd place, bronze medalist(s)		Bernhard Britz; Sweden

The men's individual time trial cycling event at the 1932 Olympic Games took place on August 4. It was competed in a 100 km time trial format.

== Results ==
=== Final ===
Rank	Name	Nationality	Time	Notes
1st place, gold medalist(s)	Attilio Pavesi	Italy	2:28:05.6	
2nd place, silver medalist(s)	Guglielmo Segato	Italy	2:29:21.4	
3rd place, bronze medalist(s)	Bernhard Britz	Sweden	2:29:45.2	
4	Giuseppe Olmo	Italy	2:29:48.2	
5	Frode Sørensen	Denmark	2:30:11.2	
6	Frank Southall	Great Britain	2:30:16.2	
7	Giovanni Cazzulani	Italy	2:31:07.2	
8	Sven Höglund	Sweden	2:31:29.4	
9	Leo Nielsen	Denmark	2:32:48.6	
10	Paul Chocque	France	2:33:24.4	
11	Henry O'Brien	United States	2:33:36.0	
12	Henry Hansen	Denmark	2:35:50.4	
13	Amédée Fournier	France	2:36:06.4	
14	Henri Mouillefarine	France	2:37:00.8	
15	Charles Holland	Great Britain	2:37:17.2	
16	Stanley Butler	Great Britain	2:37:19.6	
17	Frank Connell	United States	2:37:20.4	
18	Gunnar Andersen	Denmark	2:37:23.6	
19	William Harvell	Great Britain	2:37:46.8	
20	Arne Berg	Sweden	2:37:58.0	
21	Folke Nilsson	Sweden	2:38:04.2	
22	Glen Robbins	Canada	2:38:24.8	
23	Ron Foubister	New Zealand	2:38:42.4	
24	Georges Conan	France	2:38:58.6	
25	James Jackson	Canada	2:40:29.8	
26	Otto Luedeke	United States	2:40:59.2	
27	Frank Elliott	Canada	2:42:43.4	
28	Werner Wittig	Germany	2:43:36.2	
29	John Sinibaldi	United States	2:44:01.2	
30	Julius Maus	Germany	2:45:15.0	
31	Sebestyén Schmidt	Hungary	2:48:37.0	
32	Hubert Ebner	Germany	2:52:30.0	
33	Manuel Díaz	Mexico	3:01:08.2	
	Henry Tröndle	Germany		DNF
	Ernie Gates	Canada		DNF
