= Cycling at the 1932 Summer Olympics – Men's tandem =

Sporting event

Cycling - Men's tandem at the Games of the X Olympiad
- Venue: Rose Bowl, Pasadena
- Dates: August 1 and 3, 1932
- Competitors: 10 (individuals) 5 (teams) from 5 nations

Medalists
1st place, gold medalist(s)		Maurice Perrin; Louis Chaillot; France
2nd place, silver medalist(s)		Ernest Chambers; Stanley Chambers; Great Britain
3rd place, bronze medalist(s)		Harald Christensen; Willy Gervin; Denmark

The men's tandem cycling event at the 1932 Summer Olympics. The format was a sprint of 2000 metres.

== Results ==
Winner of each of the two heats and the top two pairs in the repechage advanced to semifinal.

=== Heats ===
Heat one

Rank	Name	Nationality	Time	Notes
1	Maurice Perrin; Louis Chaillot	France	13.2	Q
2	Ernest Chambers; Stanley Chambers	Great Britain		

Heat two

Rank	Name	Nationality	Time	Notes
1	Bernard Leene; Jacques van Egmond	Netherlands		Q
-	Harald Christensen; Willy Gervin	Denmark	[13.8]	DSQ

Repechage

Rank	Name	Nationality	Time	Notes
1	Harald Christensen; Willy Gervin	Denmark		Q
2	Ernest Chambers; Stanley Chambers	Great Britain		Q
3	Frank Testa; Royden Ingham	United States		

Winner of each of the two heats advanced to the final round.

=== Semifinal ===
Heat one

Rank	Name	Nationality	Time	Notes
1	Maurice Perrin; Louis Chaillot	France	12.1	Q
2	Harald Christensen; Willy Gervin	Denmark		

Heat two

Rank	Name	Nationality	Time	Notes
1	Ernest Chambers; Stanley Chambers	Great Britain	14.9	WO, Q

=== Final ===
Match 1/2

Rank	Name	Nationality	Time	Notes
1st place, gold medalist(s)	Maurice Perrin; Louis Chaillot	France		
2nd place, silver medalist(s)	Ernest Chambers; Stanley Chambers	Great Britain		

No 3/4 race was run DEN was awarded bronze

Rank	Name	Nationality	Time	Notes
3rd place, bronze medalist(s)	Harald Christensen; Willy Gervin	Denmark		

Key: DSQ = disqualified; WO = walkover
