= Conan (given name) =

Irish masculine name

- Gender: Male

Origin
- Origin: Irish
- Meaning: "Little hound"

Conan is an Irish surname and masculine given name which means "little wolf" or "little hound". Notable people with the name include:

== Given name ==
- Saint Conan (died 684), bishop of the Isle of Man
- Conan of Cornwall (c. 930 – c. 950), bishop of Cornwall
- Conan I of Rennes (died 992), duke of Brythonic Brittany
- Conan II of Brittany (died 1066), duke of Brittany
- Conan III of Brittany (died 1148), duke of Brittany
- Conan IV of Brittany (1138–1171), duke of Brittany
- Conan Anthony Mohan Jayamaha (1949–1992), Sri Lankan Sinhala Navy admiral
- Conan Byrne (born 1985), Irish footballer
- Conan Gray (born 1998), American singer-songwriter, YouTuber and social media personality
- Conan O'Brien (born 1963), American talk show host
- Conan Stevens, Australian actor, writer, stuntman and former professional wrestler

== Surname ==
- Georges Conan (1913–2000), French cyclist
- Laure Conan (1845–1924), pen name of Marie-Louise-Félicité Angers, French-Canadian novelist
- Neal Conan (1949–2021), American radio journalist
