= Alfhild =

Álfhildr was the name of several women in Norse mythology and legend. The name is composed of Old Norse words, alf 'elf, fairy' and hildr 'battle'. As of 2010 it was common in Norway.

== People with the name ==
=== Historic ===
- Alfhild (Saxon princess), a Saxon princess and Danish queen from Book One of Gesta Danorum
- Alfhild, concubine of Olaf II of Norway, mother of Magnus the Good
- Álfhildr (Gautreks saga), the daughter of king Harald of Wendland and wife of Geatish king Gautrekr
- Alfhild, daughter of the Geatish king Siward; see Alf and Alfhild
- Alfhild, daughter of Vingulmark king Gandalf Alfgeirsson

=== Modern ===
- Alfhild Agrell (1849–1923), Swedish writer and playwright
- Alfhild Cnattingius (1847–1932), Swedish suffragist and writer
- Alfhilda Mechlenburg (1830–1907), Danish writer
- Alfhild Stormoen (1883–1974), Norwegian actress and director
- Alfhild Tamm (1876–1959), Swedish physician, psychiatrist and psychoanalyst
