= Richard W. Mayo =

U.S. Army general

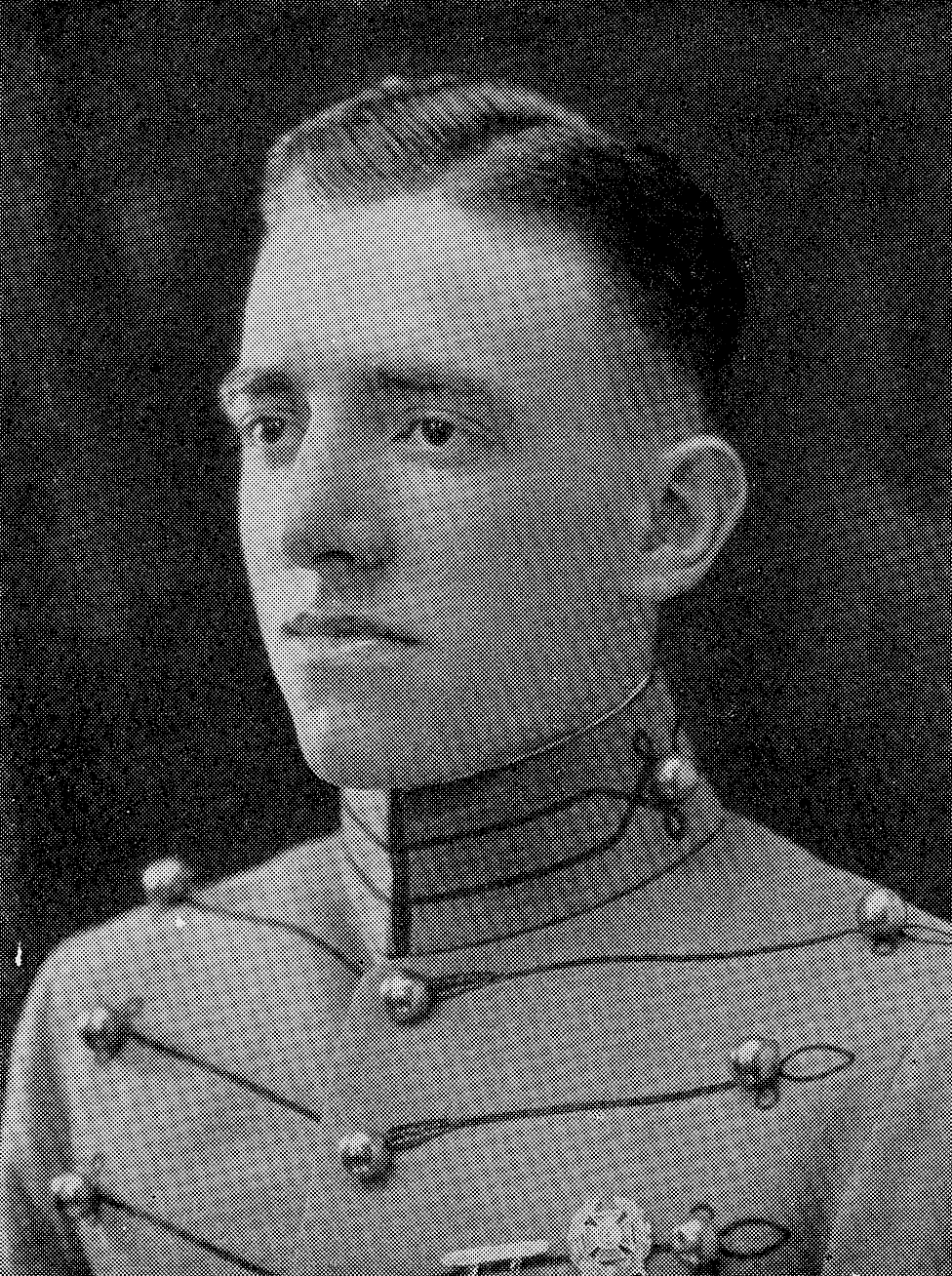
- At West Point in 1926
- Born: Richard Walden Mayo; June 12, 1902; Dorchester, Boston, U.S.
- Died: November 10, 1996 (aged 94); Boca Raton, Florida, U.S.
- Burial place: Arlington National Cemetery
- Military career
- Allegiance: United States
- Branch: United States Army
- Service years: 1926–1956
- Rank: Brigadier General
- Commands: 17th Field Artillery Group; 5th Field Artillery Group; Fort Stewart
- Awards: Bronze Star Medal; Legion of Merit; Oak leaf cluster two battle stars Taegeuk Cordon; Eulji Cordon three Battle Stars; Royal Order of the Phoenix
- Sports career
- Sport: Modern pentathlon
Medal record
Men's modern pentathlon
Representing the United States
Olympic Games
Bronze medal – third place	1932 Los Angeles	Individual

Richard Walden Mayo (June 12, 1902 – November 10, 1996) was an American Army general and athlete. He was an officer in the United States Army from 1926 to 1956, saw combat in World War II and the Korean War, and was commander of the 17th Field Artillery Group, the 5th Field Artillery Group, and Fort Stewart. He retired with the rank of brigadier general. While in the Army he competed in modern pentathlon at the 1928 and 1932 Summer Olympics, winning the bronze medal in 1932. After retiring from the Army, Mayo was a city manager in three municipalities and a community leader in Boca Raton, Florida.

== Early life ==
Mayo was born on June 12, 1902, in Boston's Dorchester neighborhood to Jeremiah J. and Elizabeth A. Mayo. He graduated from Dorchester High School. After graduation he joined the Massachusetts State Guard and took a course to help him prepare for the United States Military Academy entrance exam. As a member of the State Guard, Mayo helped keep order during the Boston Police Strike.

== West Point ==
Mayo was accepted into the United States Military Academy in 1922. At West Point, Mayo was captain of the fencing team and a member of the academy's championship-winning intramural soccer, fencing, saber, and pistol teams. He also qualified as a pistol expert and rifle marksman. During his senior year he was promoted to sergeant and was a member of the first class detail, which instructed the freshman class. Mayo graduated from the United States Military Academy in 1926.

== Athletics ==
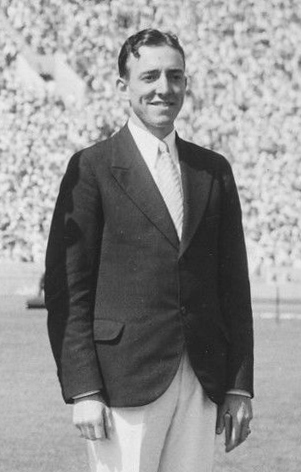
Mayo at the 1932 Summer Olympics

Mayo competed in modern pentathlon at the 1928 Summer Olympics. He finished 19th (out of 37 athletes). He was 3rd in fencing, 11th in running, 12th in shooting, 23rd in swimming, and 37th in equestrian.

In 1931, Mayo was one of nine Army officers chosen to be retained for further training in preparation for the 1932 Summer Olympics. He also won a fencing competition for members of the United States Olympic fencing and pentathlon teams hosted by the New York Athletic Club. He finished third at the U.S. Olympic trials, which assured him a place on the Olympic team.

At the 1932 Olympics, Mayo became a surprise contender for the gold medal. He finished second in the first day's event, steeplechase. On the second day, he tied with Sven Thofelt for the overall lead after a second-place finish in fencing. After winning the shooting event, he took sole possession of first place. On the fourth day of competition, Mayo retained his lead by finishing fourteenth in swimming. Going into the final day of the competition, Mayo had a 3½-point lead over Johan Gabriel Oxenstierna, a 4-point lead over Sven Thofelt, and a 10-point lead over Bo Lindman, all of Sweden. The final event was Mayo's weakest – running. He finished seventeenth, which moved him behind Oxenstierna and Lindman, but allowed him to maintain a half-point lead over Thofelt, giving him the bronze medal. He was the first American to win a medal in modern pentathlon.

In 1936, Mayo served as a manager of the United States Olympic pentathlon team.

== Military career ==
After graduating from West Point, Mayo assigned to Fort Bragg. He was later detailed to Governors Island to train for the 1928 Olympics. He was later stationed at Fort Sill, Fort Myer, Fort Leavenworth, and Fort Hood. While at Fort Myer, Mayo met Northa Porter, the daughter of Interstate Commerce Commissioner Claude R. Porter. They married in June 1934 and would go on to have two children – Sally and Richard, Jr.

When the United States entered World War II, Mayo was stationed in Trinidad, British West Indies, where he was the senior aide to the commanding general there. He was soon brought back to the United States, where he graduated from the Command and General Staff School at Fort Leavenworth, Kansas in 1942. Mayo was subsequently given command of a tank destroyer battalion that fought in Normandy. From 1944 to 1945, he was Assistant Artillery Officer of the Fifteenth United States Army. He then served as the Chief of the Redeployment and Troops Branch Headquarters of the European Theater. Mayo was awarded a Bronze Star Medal for his service in the European Theater of Operations.

In May 1947, Mayo was transferred to the War Department General Staff, where he became Chief of European and Mid-East Branch, Plans and Operations Division. In 1950 he became Commanding Officer of the 17th Field Artillery Group, stationed at Fort Sill.

=== Korean War ===
While stationed at Fort Still, James Van Fleet requested that Mayo come to Korea. From August 1951 to January 1952 he served as Chief of Staff to the Korean Military Advisory Group. He then served as the commanding officer of the 5th Field Artillery Group, 2nd Republic of Korea Corps, Eighth United States Army until January 1953.

While in Korea, Mayo saw front line combat at Capitol Hill and Finger Ridge, was promoted to brigadier general, and was awarded the Legion of Merit, a bronze oak leaf cluster (in lieu of a second Legion of Merit), two battle stars, the Taegeuk Cordon, and the Eulji Cordon.

=== Fort Stewart ===
From 1953 to 1956, Mayo was the commander of Fort Stewart. When Mayo arrived at Fort Stewart, the base had the highest rate of venereal disease in the Army, with 428 cases per thousand men (the average was then 67 cases per one thousand). Mayo worked to clean up the area around the fort, which contained slot parlors and dive bars frequented by prostitutes. Mayo's efforts resulted in a grand jury indicting 44 people on gambling-related charges and accusing Liberty County Sheriff Paul Sikes of having "knowingly failed and neglected" to enforce the law. Sikes attempted to have Mayo transferred by his political ally, Senate Armed Services Committee Chairman Richard Russell, Jr., however Mayo chose to remain at Fort Stewart. During his battle with Sikes, Mayo was twice turned down for promotion to major general, as Pentagon officials decided not to put his name before Russell and the Armed Services Committee. He retired from the Army on July 31, 1956.

== City manager ==
On May 31, 1956, the Gloucester, Massachusetts, City Council chose Mayo to serve as city manager. He took office upon his retirement from the Army. In 1958, Mayo left Gloucester to become City Manager of Hickory, North Carolina. In 1960 he became the first town manager of Lake Park, Florida, a position he held until 1962.

== Later life and death ==
In 1964, Mayo and his wife retired to Boca Raton, Florida. There he became an active member of the community. Mayo was a member of the Salvation Army Board of Directors, a member Palm Beach County Planning Board, and an elder of the First Presbyterian Church. In 1972 he helped found Citizens for Reasonable Growth, a Boca Raton watchdog group. Mayo also attended the University of Florida and became a teacher in the Lake Worth, Florida, public schools and at Saint Andrew's School in Boca Raton.

Mayo died on November 10, 1996, at his home in Boca Raton. He was buried in Arlington National Cemetery.
