= Consonni =

Consonni is an Italian surname. Notable people with the surname include:

- Chiara Consonni (born 1999), Italian racing cyclist
- Edoardo Consonni, the chief journalist of Ecclesia Dei
- Luigi Consonni (born 1977), Italian footballer
- Luigi Consonni (cyclist) (1905–1992), Italian cyclist
- Pierluigi Consonni (1949–2020), Italian professional footballer
- Simone Consonni (born 1994), Italian cyclist
