= Wrestling at the 1932 Summer Olympics – Men's Greco-Roman middleweight =

Men's Greco-Roman middleweight at the Games of the X Olympiad
- Venue: Grand Olympic Auditorium
- Dates: 4–7 August 1932
- Competitors: 4 from 4 nations

Medalists
1st place, gold medalist(s)		Väinö Kokkinen	Finland
2nd place, silver medalist(s)		Jean Földeák	Germany
3rd place, bronze medalist(s)		Axel Cadier	Sweden

The men's Greco-Roman middleweight competition at the 1932 Summer Olympics in Los Angeles took place from 4 August to 7 August at the Grand Olympic Auditorium. Nations were limited to one competitor. This weight class was limited to wrestlers weighing up to 79kg.

This Greco-Roman wrestling competition followed the same format that was introduced at the 1928 Summer Olympics, using an elimination system based on the accumulation of points. Each round featured all wrestlers pairing off and wrestling one bout (with one wrestler having a bye if there were an odd number). The loser received 3 points. The winner received 1 point if the win was by decision and 0 points if the win was by fall. At the end of each round, any wrestler with at least 5 points was eliminated.

== Schedule ==
Date	Event
4 August 1932	Round 1
6 August 1932	Round 2
7 August 1932	Final round

== Results ==
=== Round 1 ===
Both bouts were won by decision. The winners each had 1 point, the losers each had 3. Poilvé, however, retired due to injury.

Bouts

Winner	Nation	Victory Type	Loser	Nation
Väinö Kokkinen	Finland	Decision	Emile Poilvé	France
Jean Földeák	Germany	Decision	Axel Cadier	Sweden

Points

Rank	Wrestler	Nation	Start	Earned	Total
1	Jean Földeák	Germany	0	1	1
1	Väinö Kokkinen	Finland	0	1	1
3	Axel Cadier	Sweden	0	3	3
4	Emile Poilvé	France	0	3	3r

=== Round 2 ===
Cadier had a bye due to Poilvé's retirement. The two first-round winners faced off, with Kokkinen winning by a decision to move to 2 points while Földeák had 4 points after the loss.

Bouts

Winner	Nation	Victory Type	Loser	Nation
Väinö Kokkinen	Finland	Decision	Jean Földeák	Germany
Axel Cadier	Sweden	Bye	N/A	N/A

Points

Rank	Wrestler	Nation	Start	Earned	Total
1	Väinö Kokkinen	Finland	1	1	2
2	Axel Cadier	Sweden	3	0	3
3	Jean Földeák	Germany	1	3	4

=== Final round ===
Kokkinen beat Cadier to finish 3–0 and with 2 points. Földeák had a bye, and finished with the silver medal at points after having beating Cadier earlier by decision and lost to Kokkinen. Cadier finished 0–2 but with the bronze medal.

Bouts

Winner	Nation	Victory Type	Loser	Nation
Väinö Kokkinen	Finland	Fall	Axel Cadier	Sweden
Jean Földeák	Germany	Bye	N/A	N/A

Points

Rank	Wrestler	Nation	Start	Earned	Total
1st place, gold medalist(s)	Väinö Kokkinen	Finland	2	0	2
2nd place, silver medalist(s)	Jean Földeák	Germany	4	0	4
3rd place, bronze medalist(s)	Axel Cadier	Sweden	3	3	6
