= Wrestling at the 1932 Summer Olympics – Men's Greco-Roman light heavyweight =

Men's Greco-Roman light heavyweight at the Games of the X Olympiad
- Venue: Grand Olympic Auditorium
- Dates: 5–7 August 1932
- Competitors: 3 from 3 nations

Medalists
1st place, gold medalist(s)		Rudolf Svensson	Sweden
2nd place, silver medalist(s)		Onni Pellinen	Finland
3rd place, bronze medalist(s)		Mario Gruppioni	Italy

The men's Greco-Roman featherweight competition at the 1932 Summer Olympics in Los Angeles took place from 5 August to 7 August at the Grand Olympic Auditorium. Nations were limited to one competitor. This weight class was limited to wrestlers weighing up to 87kg.

This Greco-Roman wrestling competition followed the same format that was introduced at the 1928 Summer Olympics, using an elimination system based on the accumulation of points. Each round featured all wrestlers pairing off and wrestling one bout (with one wrestler having a bye if there were an odd number). The loser received 3 points. The winner received 1 point if the win was by decision and 0 points if the win was by fall. At the end of each round, any wrestler with at least 5 points was eliminated.

== Schedule ==
Date	Event
5 August 1932	Round 1
6 August 1932	Round 2
7 August 1932	Final round

== Results ==
=== Round 1 ===
With only three wrestlers, Gruppioni had a bye and only one bout was contested in the first round. Svensson won by decision.

Bouts

Winner	Nation	Victory Type	Loser	Nation
Rudolf Svensson	Sweden	Decision	Onni Pellinen	Finland
Mario Gruppioni	Italy	Bye	N/A	N/A

Points

Rank	Wrestler	Nation	Start	Earned	Total
1	Mario Gruppioni	Italy	0	0	0
2	Rudolf Svensson	Sweden	0	1	1
3	Onni Pellinen	Finland	0	3	3

=== Round 2 ===
Svensson had the bye this round, staying at 1 point. Gruppioni lost to Pellinen by fall, resulting in both having a total of 3 points.

Bouts

Winner	Nation	Victory Type	Loser	Nation
Onni Pellinen	Finland	Fall	Mario Gruppioni	Italy
Rudolf Svensson	Sweden	Bye	N/A	N/A

Points

Rank	Wrestler	Nation	Start	Earned	Total
1	Rudolf Svensson	Sweden	1	0	1
2	Mario Gruppioni	Italy	0	3	3
2	Onni Pellinen	Finland	3	0	3

=== Final round ===
Svensson won his second bout, giving Gruppioni his second loss. Svensson took the gold, having beat Pellinen previously.

Bouts

Winner	Nation	Victory Type	Loser	Nation
Rudolf Svensson	Sweden	Fall	Mario Gruppioni	Italy
Onni Pellinen	Finland	Bye	N/A	N/A

Points

Rank	Wrestler	Nation	Start	Earned	Total
1st place, gold medalist(s)	Rudolf Svensson	Sweden	1	0	1
2nd place, silver medalist(s)	Onni Pellinen	Finland	3	0	3
3rd place, bronze medalist(s)	Mario Gruppioni	Italy	3	3	6
