= Cycling at the 1932 Summer Olympics – Men's track time trial =

Cycling - Men's track time trial at the Games of the X Olympiad
- Track cycling pictogram
- Venue: Rose Bowl, Pasadena
- Date: August 1, 1932
- Competitors: 9 from 9 nations
- Winning time: 1:13.0 OR

Medalists
1st place, gold medalist(s)		Dunc Gray; Australia
2nd place, silver medalist(s)		Jacques van Egmond; Netherlands
3rd place, bronze medalist(s)		Charles Rampelberg; France

The men's track time trial at the 1932 Summer Olympics was held on 1 August. Nine cyclists from nine nations competed, with each nation limited to a single rider. The event was won by Dunc Gray of Australia, securing the nation's first victory in the men's track time trial. Gray became the first cyclist to win two medals in the event, adding the gold medal to his 1928 bronze. Jacques van Egmond earned the Netherlands its second consecutive silver medal, while Charles Rampelberg of France won the bronze, marking France's first medal in the event since 1896 (36 years, though the event had only been contested twice in the interim).

== Background ==
This was the third appearance of the event, which had previously been held in 1896 and 1928. It would be held every Games until being dropped from the programme after 2004. The only returning cyclist from 1928 was bronze medalist Dunc Gray of Australia. Gray had the flu shortly before the competition, but received a "miracle drug" from his coach containing brandy.

Mexico and the United States each made their debut in the men's track time trial. France and Great Britain each made their third appearance, having competed at every appearance of the event.

== Competition format ==
The event was a time trial on the track, with each cyclist competing separately to attempt to achieve the fastest time. Each cyclist raced one kilometre from a standing start.

== Records ==
The following was the Olympic record prior to the competition.

World record	Unknown	Unknown^{*}	Unknown	Unknown
Olympic record	Willy Hansen (DEN)	1:15.2	Amsterdam, Netherlands	5 August 1928

^{*} World records were not tracked by the UCI until 1949.

Dunc Gray set the new Olympic record at 1:13.0. The top five cyclists all beat the old record.

== Schedule ==
Date	Time	Round
Monday, 1 August 1932	19:30	Final

== Results ==
Rank	Cyclist	Nation	Lap 1	Lap 2	Time	Notes
1st place, gold medalist(s)	Dunc Gray	Australia	27.7	52.5	1:13.0	OR
2nd place, silver medalist(s)	Jacques van Egmond	Netherlands	30.2	54.6	1:13.3	
3rd place, bronze medalist(s)	Charles Rampelberg	France	27.9	52.4	1:13.4	
4	William Harvell	Great Britain	28.6	54.3	1:14.7	
4	Luigi Consonni	Italy	27.9	53.2	1:14.7	
6	Lew Rush	Canada	28.1	54.1	1:15.6	
7	Harald Christensen	Denmark	29.5	55.0	1:16.0	
8	Bernard Mammes	United States	29.0	56.0	1:18.0	
9	Ernesto Grobet	Mexico	31.9	1:00.1	1:25.2	
