= Folke Nilsson =

Folke Nilsson may refer to:

- Folke Nilsson (cyclist), Swedish cyclist
- Folke Nilsson (footballer), Swedish footballer
