= Bernard Mammes =

American racing cyclist

Personal information
- Born: September 3, 1911 New York, New York, United States
- Died: February 27, 2000 (aged 88) Rockaway Park, New York, United States

Cycling career
- Sport: Cycling

Bernard Mammes (September 3, 1911 – February 27, 2000) was an American cyclist. Born in Manhattan, Mammes moved with his family to Rockaway Park, Queens around 1920. His father owned an ice cream parlor, where Mammes worked as a youth.

Taking place during the Depression, many thought the 1932 Summer Olympics held in Los Angeles, was going to be an economic failure. Even so, after a few film stars such as Charlie Chaplin, Marlene Dietrich, Douglas Fairbanks and Mary Pickford volunteered to entertain, 37 countries sent over 1300 athletes to the games. They were a huge success. This was the first time an Olympic Village would be built for the games, and competitors such as Babe Didrikson, Eddie Tolan and Luigi Beccali made headlines. Mammes won a position as a cyclist, and placed 8th in the 1000m time trial with a time of 1 minute and 18 seconds.

Answering the call of his country, he entered the United States Armed Forces, where he served as a staff sergeant in World War II. In 1945, he married Nancy, and had four children.

After being discharged, he returned to New York, partnering with his father in Mammes' Ice Cream, which had become well known in Rockaway. Until 1968, he worked in the parlor from May through September, while working at Hegarty and Co., from which he retired after 25 years. From 1975 until his final retirement in 1998 at age 86, Mammes worked at Gateway National Park's Breezy Point Unit at Riis Park.

Bernard Mammes is buried at St. Charles Cemetery, Farmingdale, Long Island.
