= Henry Tröndle =

German cyclist

Personal information
- Born: 15 March 1906 Albbruck, Grand Duchy of Baden, German Empire
- Died: 18 March 1991 (aged 85) Ridgewood, New Jersey, United States

Cycling career
- Sport: Cycling

Henry Tröndle (15 March 1906 – 18 March 1991) was a German cyclist. He competed in the individual and team road race events at the 1932 Summer Olympics.
