= Yoneichi Miyazaki =

Japanese wrestler

Personal information
- Nationality: Japanese
- Born: 8 August 1908

Sport
- Sport: Wrestling

Yoneichi Miyazaki (宮崎 米一, Miyazaki Yoneichi) (born 8 August 1908, date of death unknown) was a Japanese wrestler, specialized in Greco-Roman wrestling. He competed in the men's Greco-Roman lightweight at the 1932 Summer Olympics, in which he was ousted in the third round after defeats by Denmark's Abraham Kurland and Sweden's Erik Malmberg by clinching.
