= Wrestling at the 1932 Summer Olympics – Men's Greco-Roman lightweight =

Men's Greco-Roman lightweight at the Games of the X Olympiad
- Venue: Grand Olympic Auditorium
- Dates: 4–7 August 1932
- Competitors: 6 from 6 nations

Medalists
1st place, gold medalist(s)		Erik Malmberg	Sweden
2nd place, silver medalist(s)		Abraham Kurland	Denmark
3rd place, bronze medalist(s)		Eduard Sperling	Germany

The men's Greco-Roman lightweight competition at the 1932 Summer Olympics in Los Angeles took place from 4 August to 7 August at the Grand Olympic Auditorium. Nations were limited to one competitor. This weight class was limited to wrestlers weighing up to 66kg.

This Greco-Roman wrestling competition followed the same format that was introduced at the 1928 Summer Olympics, using an elimination system based on the accumulation of points. Each round featured all wrestlers pairing off and wrestling one bout (with one wrestler having a bye if there were an odd number). The loser received 3 points. The winner received 1 point if the win was by decision and 0 points if the win was by fall. At the end of each round, any wrestler with at least 5 points was eliminated.

== Schedule ==
Date	Event
4 August 1932	Round 1
5 August 1932	Round 2
6 August 1932	Round 3
7 August 1932	Final round

== Results ==
=== Round 1 ===
Reini and Kurland won by fall, earning 0 points in the first round. Malmberg won by decision, earning 1 point. Sperling and Miyazaki's losses put them at 3 points each, while Tozzi was injured in his loss and abandoned the competition.

Bouts

Winner	Nation	Victory Type	Loser	Nation
Erik Malmberg	Sweden	Decision	Eduard Sperling	Germany
Aarne Reini	Finland	Fall	Silvio Tozzi	Italy
Abraham Kurland	Denmark	Fall	Yoneichi Miyazaki	Japan

Points

Rank	Wrestler	Nation	Start	Earned	Total
1	Abraham Kurland	Denmark	0	0	0
1	Aarne Reini	Finland	0	0	0
3	Erik Malmberg	Sweden	0	1	1
4	Miyazaki Yoneichi	Japan	0	3	3
4	Eduard Sperling	Germany	0	3	3
6	Silvio Tozzi	Italy	0	3	3r

=== Round 2 ===
Miyazaki had a bye to the Tozzi's retirement. Both of the winners by fall in the first round lost in the second, joining Miyazaki at 3 points. Malmberg won his second bout by decision, arriving at 2 points. Sperling was the other winner in this round, also by decision, moving to 4 points. Nobody was eliminated.

Bouts

Winner	Nation	Victory Type	Loser	Nation
Erik Malmberg	Sweden	Decision	Aarne Reini	Finland
Eduard Sperling	Germany	Decision	Abraham Kurland	Denmark
Miyazaki Yoneichi	Japan	Bye	N/A	N/A

Points

Rank	Wrestler	Nation	Start	Earned	Total
1	Erik Malmberg	Sweden	1	1	2
2	Abraham Kurland	Denmark	0	3	3
2	Aarne Reini	Finland	0	3	3
2	Miyazaki Yoneichi	Japan	3	0	3
5	Eduard Sperling	Germany	3	1	4

=== Round 3 ===
Kurland had the bye this round, staying at 3 points. Three of the four wrestlers who actually had bouts this round were eliminated: Reini and Miyazaki each suffered their second loss, while Sperling's win by decision gave him a fifth point and left him with the bronze medal. Malmberg's third win came by fall this time, leaving him at 2 points.

Bouts

Winner	Nation	Victory Type	Loser	Nation
Erik Malmberg	Sweden	Fall	Miyazaki Yoneichi	Japan
Eduard Sperling	Germany	Decision	Aarne Reini	Finland
Abraham Kurland	Denmark	Bye	N/A	N/A

Points

Rank	Wrestler	Nation	Start	Earned	Total
1	Erik Malmberg	Sweden	2	0	2
2	Abraham Kurland	Denmark	3	0	3
3rd place, bronze medalist(s)	Eduard Sperling	Germany	4	1	5
4	Aarne Reini	Finland	3	3	6
4	Miyazaki Yoneichi	Japan	3	3	6

=== Final round ===
Malmberg won his fourth bout in a decision over Kurland to win the gold medal. In a quirk of the competition system, Kurland took silver with a 1–2 record, having lost to both of the other medalists and despite the bronze medalist, Sperling, having a 2–1 record (having lost only to Malmberg and having defeated Kurland).

Bouts

Winner	Nation	Victory Type	Loser	Nation
Erik Malmberg	Sweden	Decision	Abraham Kurland	Denmark

Points

Rank	Wrestler	Nation	Start	Earned	Total
1st place, gold medalist(s)	Erik Malmberg	Sweden	2	1	3
2nd place, silver medalist(s)	Abraham Kurland	Denmark	3	3	6
