= Erna Bogen-Bogáti =

Hungarian fencer (1906–2002)

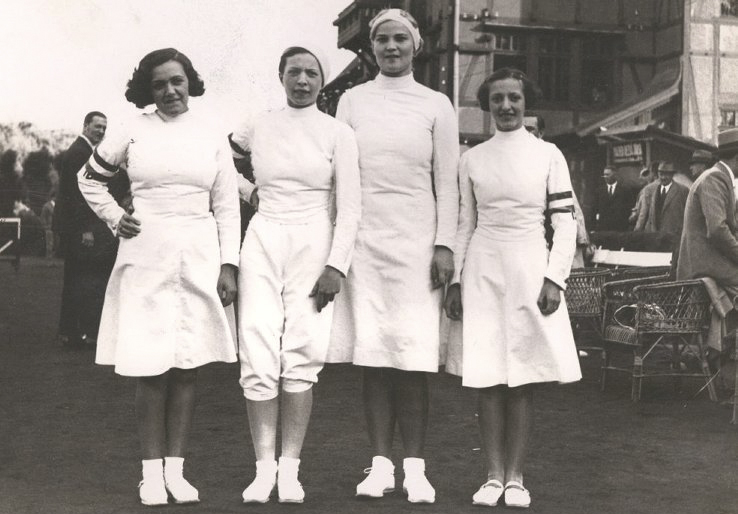
- Margit Danÿ, Ilona Elek, Erna Bogen, Margit Elek

Personal information
- Born: 31 December 1906 Jarosław, Austria-Hungary
- Died: 23 November 2002 (aged 95)

Sport
- Sport: Fencing
Medal record
Women's fencing
Representing Hungary
Olympic Games
Bronze medal – third place	1932 Los Angeles	Foil, individual

Erna Bogen-Bogáti (31 December 1906 – 23 November 2002) was a Hungarian fencer. She won a bronze medal in the women's individual foil event at the 1932 Summer Olympics. She was the daughter of Hungarian Albert Bogen, who competed for Austria at the 1912 Summer Olympics (winning a silver medal in team sabre) and for Hungary at the 1928 Summer Olympics. She was the wife of the Hungarian fencer Aladár Gerevich and mother of Olympic medalist Pál Gerevich.
