= Ron Foubister =

New Zealand cyclist (1912–1954)

Personal information
- Born: 4 January 1912 Auckland, New Zealand
- Died: 22 May 1954 (aged 42)

Cycling career
- Sport: Cycling

Ronald Gordon Foubister (4 January 1912 – 22 May 1954) was a New Zealand road cyclist from Auckland.

In the 1932 Olympics he competed in the Road Race, coming 23rd (in 2 h 38 min 42.4 s) in a 68-strong field. He had expected to ride a straight-out road race, but found that time trial conditions were observed. He was 10 minutes behind the winner Attilio Pavesi of Italy. He was the first New Zealand cyclist to compete at the Olympics.

He set a one-hour record at the Western Springs Stadium of 24 miles and 1282 yards on 29 January 1931, and later in the year set a record for the Palmerston North to Wellington event of 4 hours 39 minutes and 39 seconds; more than 10 minutes off Frank Grose's record. His competitive career ended shortly before World War II.
