= Sebestyén Schmidt =

Hungarian cyclist

Personal information
- Full name: Sebestyén Schmidt
- Born: 3 February 1901
- Died: 13 September 1971 (aged 70)

Cycling career
- Sport: Cycling

Sebestyén Schmidt (3 February 1901 – 13 September 1971) was a Hungarian cyclist. He competed in the individual road race event at the 1932 Summer Olympics.
