= Manuel Díaz (Mexican cyclist) =

Mexican cyclist

Personal information
- Born: 25 September 1899 Aguascalientes, Mexico

Cycling career
- Sport: Cycling

Manuel Díaz (born 25 September 1899, date of death unknown) was a Mexican cyclist. He competed in the individual road race at the 1932 Summer Olympics.
