= Bobby Thomas (cyclist) =

American cyclist (1912–2008)

Personal information
- Born: September 7, 1912 Kenosha, Wisconsin, United States
- Died: November 12, 2008 (aged 96) Phoenix, Arizona, United States

Cycling career
- Sport: Cycling

Bobby Thomas (September 7, 1912 – November 12, 2008) was an American cyclist from Kenosha, Wisconsin. He competed in the sprint event at the 1932 Summer Olympics. In 1938 he won the Six Days of Buffalo.
