= Leo Marchiori =

Canadian cyclist

Personal information
- Born: 26 June 1898 Venice, Italy
- Died: 27 May 1949 (aged 50) Vancouver, British Columbia, Canada

Cycling career
- Sport: Cycling

Leo Marchiori (26 June 1898 – 27 May 1949) was a Canadian cyclist. He competed in the sprint event at the 1932 Summer Olympics.
