= Ernesto Grobet =

Mexican cyclist

Personal information
- Born: 29 June 1909 San Andrés Tuxtla, Mexico
- Died: 29 September 1969 (aged 60) Mexico City, Mexico

Cycling career
- Sport: Cycling

Ernesto Grobet (29 June 1909 – 29 September 1969) was a Mexican cyclist. He competed in the time trial event at the 1932 Summer Olympics.
