= Enrique Heredia =

Mexican cyclist

Personal information
- Born: 1 January 1912 Mexico City, Mexico
- Died: 26 June 1996 (aged 84) Mexico City, Mexico

Cycling career
- Sport: Cycling

Enrique Heredia (1 January 1912 – 26 June 1996) was a Mexican cyclist. He competed in the sprint event at the 1932 Summer Olympics.
