= Otto Luedeke =

American cyclist

Personal information
- Born: July 8, 1916 Union City, New Jersey, U.S.
- Died: October 20, 2005 (aged 89) Palm Bay, Florida, U.S.

Cycling career
- Sport: Cycling

Otto H. Luedeke (July 8, 1916 – October 20, 2005) was an American cyclist. He competed in the individual and team road race events at the 1932 Summer Olympics. Luedeke was a veteran of the U.S. Army and is buried in Arlington National Cemetery.

His son, Raymond Luedeke, is a composer and clarinetist, who for many years was associate principal clarinet with the Toronto Symphony Orchestra and who presently lives in New York City, where he is artistic director of Voice Afire Opera-Cabaret.
