= Skänninge =

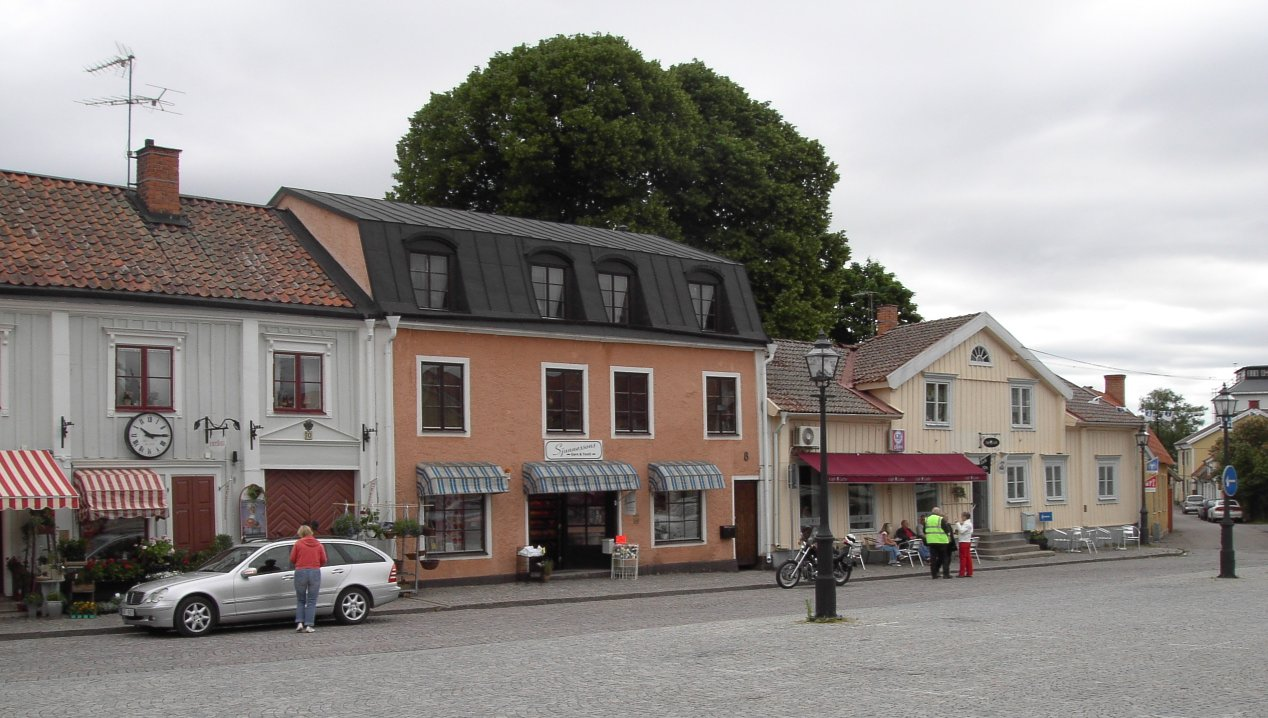
- Market square

- Coat of arms

- Location within Östergötland Location within Sweden
- Coordinates: 58°24′N 15°05′E
- Country: Sweden
- Province: Östergötland
- County: Östergötland County
- Municipality: Mjölby Municipality

Area
  - Total: 2.76 km^{2} (1.07 sq mi)

Population (31 December 2010)
  - Total: 3,140
  - Density: 1,138/km^{2} (2,950/sq mi)
- Time zone: UTC+1 (CET)
  - Summer (DST): UTC+2 (CEST)

Skänninge is a locality situated in Mjölby Municipality, Östergötland County, Sweden with 3,140 inhabitants in 2010. It lies about 10 km north of the municipal seat Mjölby.

Before the local government reform in 1971, the City of Skänninge was a municipal entity of its own.

Skänninge is, despite its small population, for historical reasons normally still referred to as a city. Statistics Sweden, however, only counts localities with more than 10,000 inhabitants as cities.

The cycler Bernhard Britz was born here

== Geography ==
The town is located on the Skena river.

== History ==
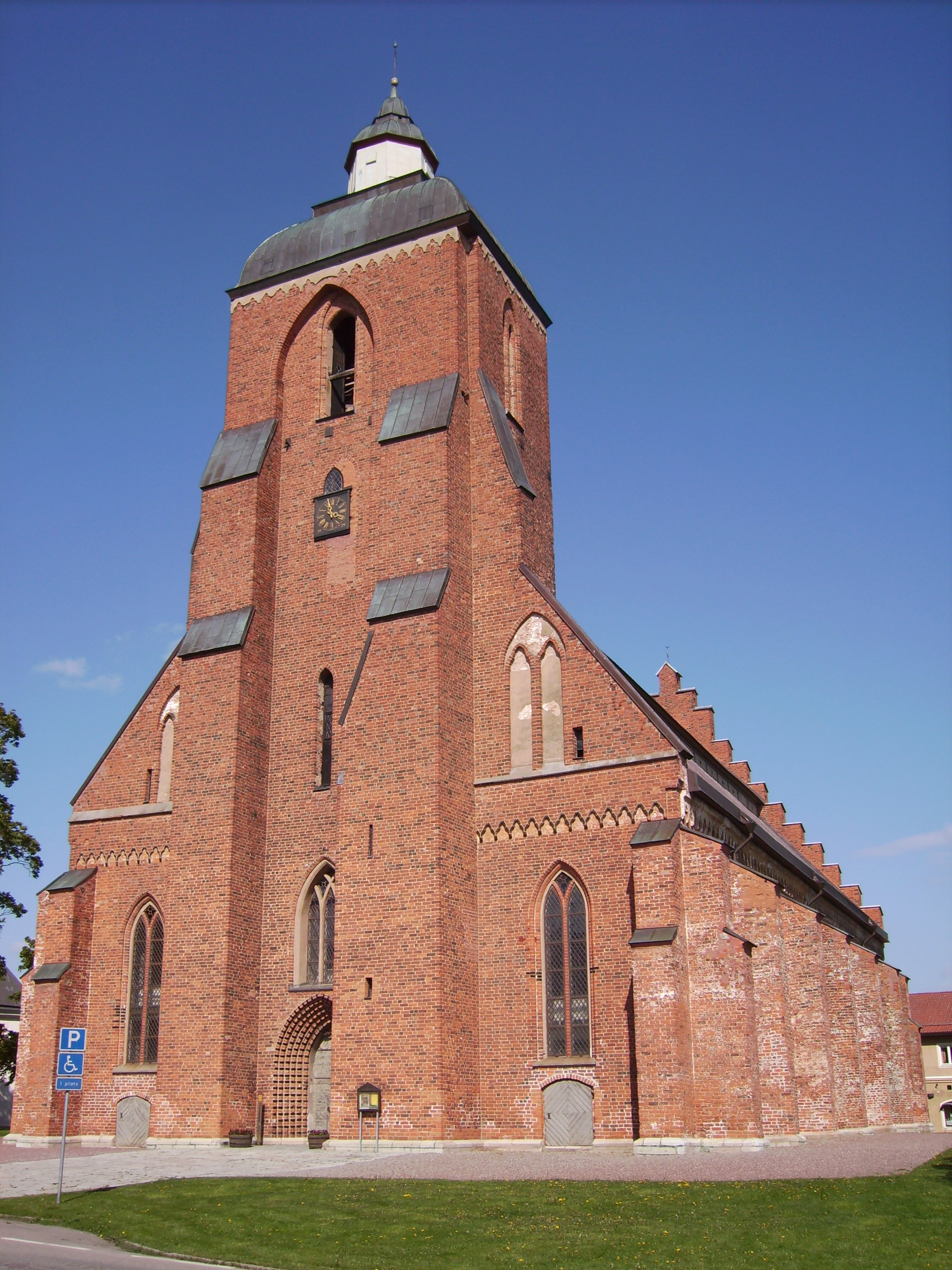
Vårfrukyrkan

The history of the town goes back to the 11th century, making it one of the oldest cities in Sweden. The town has changed little since then and is still the same size as the same street structure. Many locations are recognizable since the Middle Ages.

One of the older buildings in the medieval Brick Gothic Church of Our Lady, Sw. Vårfrukyrkan, constructed by the town's German population in honor of the Virgin Mary. Apart from the church, the town also contains the remains of a monastery of the Dominican order.

In 1250, the reigning family of Folkung had its main quarters near Skänninge, and the town developed into something of the Götaland capital, and the market place became one of the richest and most attended in the country. However, in the 13th century, the nearby located city of Vadstena surpassed it in interest. Furthermore, Skännige suffered fires in 1477 and 1466.

The annual Skänninge Market with its 1000-year-old tradition is still being held in August every year and visited by around 120,000 people.

== Notable people ==
- Alfhild Cnattingius (1847–1932) – suffragist and writer in Nora
