= Frank Testa =

American cyclist

Personal information
- Born: October 7, 1903 New York, New York, United States
- Died: November 12, 2000 (aged 97) Los Angeles, California, United States

Cycling career
- Sport: Cycling

Frank Testa (October 7, 1903 – November 12, 2000) was an American cyclist. He competed in the tandem event at the 1932 Summer Olympics.
