= Royden Ingham =

American cyclist

Personal information
- Born: April 29, 1911 Los Angeles, California, United States
- Died: May 7, 1999 (aged 88) Sun City, California, United States

Cycling career
- Sport: Cycling

Royden Ingham (April 29, 1911 – May 7, 1999) was an American cyclist. He competed in the tandem event at the 1932 Summer Olympics.
