= Skena River =

River in the province of Östergötland, Sweden

Coordinates: 58.40132°N 15.09308°E

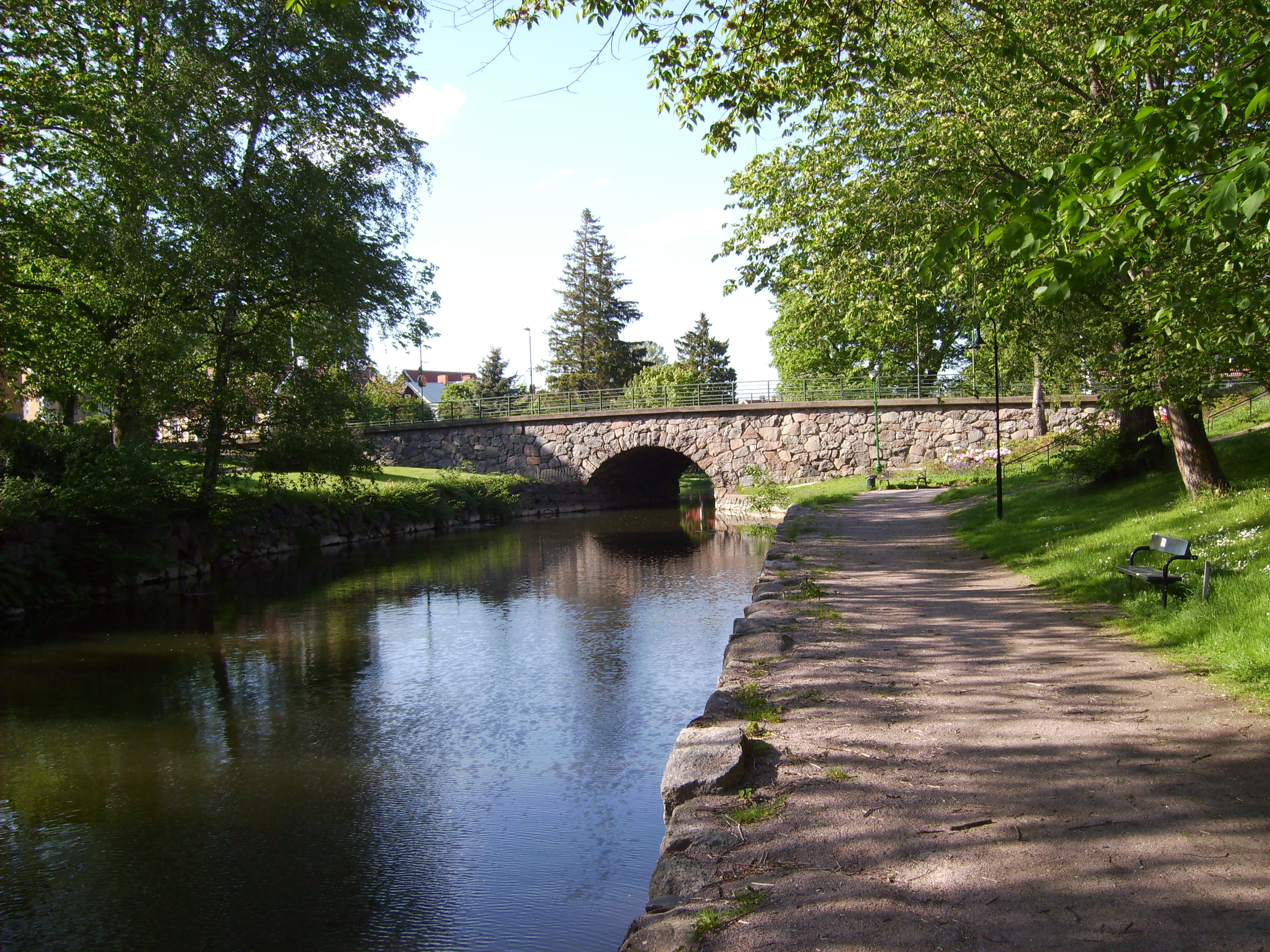
- Native name: Skenaan (Swedish)

Location
- Country: Sweden
- County: Östergötland County

Skena River (Swedish: Skenaån) is a river in the province of Östergötland in eastern Sweden. Its well is on the plains of the town of Skänninge and it ends in the river "Svartån" (Black river).
