= Raymond Luedeke =

American-Canadian composer (born 1944)

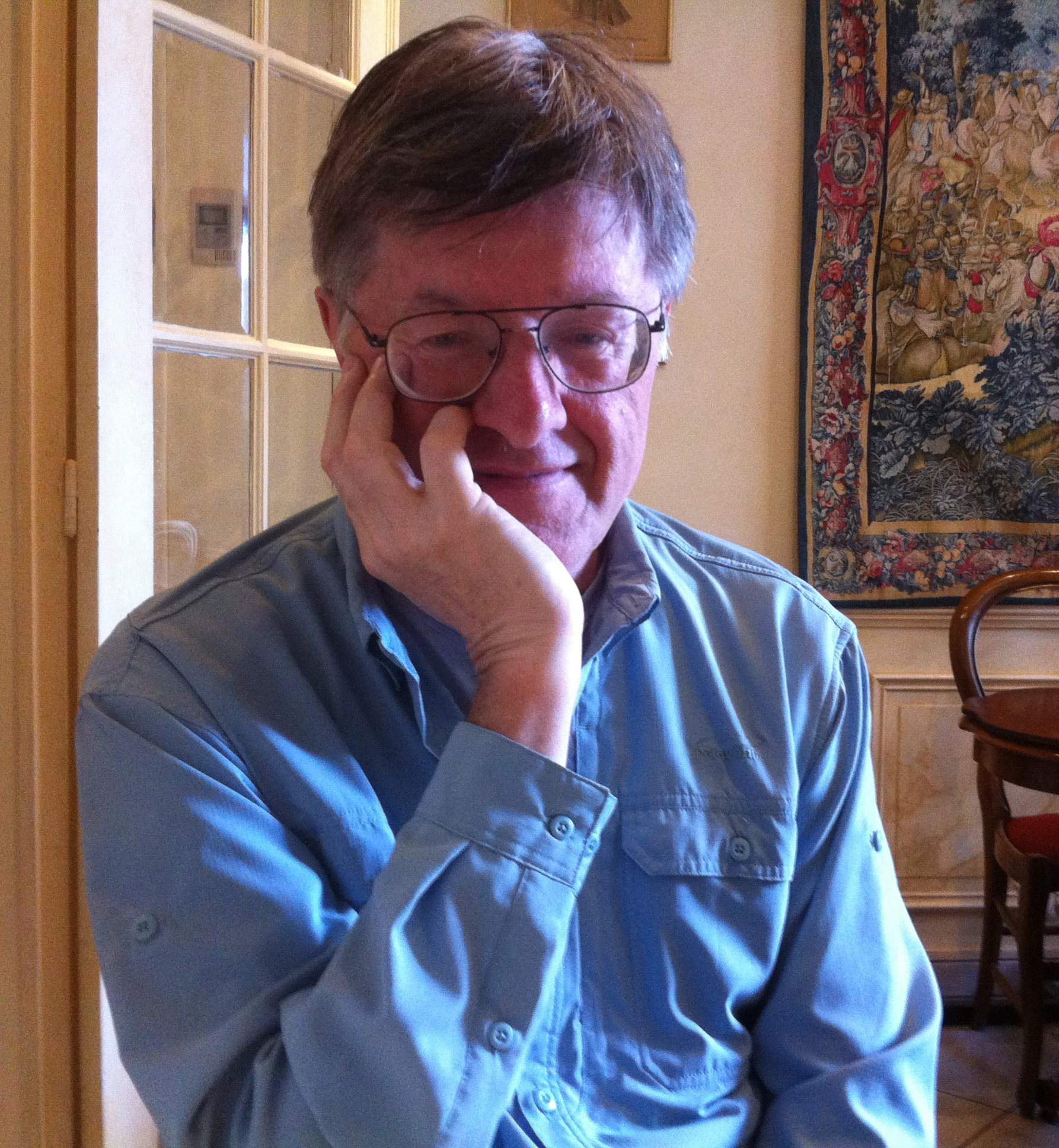
Raymond Luedeke

Raymond Luedeke (born 1944) is an American / Canadian composer of contemporary classical music. Praised for his idiosyncratic instrumental writing and for his orchestration, Luedeke has more recently concentrated on works for music theatre. Although born in New York City, he spent 29 years as Associate Principal Clarinet with the Toronto Symphony Orchestra, a position he left in 2010. A dual citizen of the United States and Canada, Ray Luedeke is artistic director of Voice Afire Opera-Cabaret in New York City.

== Biography ==
Son of Otto Luedeke, an officer in the US Army and a competitor in the 1932 Los Angeles Summer Olympic Games, Raymond Luedeke had a peripatetic childhood. Between the ages of 5 and 8, he lived in Japan. He alludes that his first concert of classical music was heard in Tokyo and that the music was Japanese classical music. He began piano lessons in Japan but did not continue this until the family was living in Massachusetts, where he took up the clarinet at the age of nine. He was soon composing his first pieces, something he continued when the family moved to New Jersey.

In 1966 Luedeke received his bachelor's degree from the Eastman School of Music, majoring in Music History. The following year he attended the University of Music and Performing Arts Vienna, on a Fulbright Grant, studying composition and clarinet. From 1967 to 1971 Ray Luedeke was a member of the United States Air Force Band, these being the years of the Vietnam War and the draft. While in Washington, D.C., he studied orchestration with Lawrence T. Odom (arranger and harpist with the USAF Band), wrote and arranged music for the Band, and received his M. Music in composition from The Catholic University of America. Later, he would study with George Crumb at Dartmouth and receive his Doctor of Musical Arts degree in composition from Northwestern University, where he studied with Alan Stout.

From 1971 to19 74, Luedeke taught at The University of Wisconsin / Stevens Point, from 1974 to 1976 at Northwestern University, and from 1976 to 1981 at University of Missouri-Kansas City. While at Northwestern he was co-founder of The Twittering Machine, a contemporary music ensemble based at the Chicago Museum of Contemporary Art. In Kansas City he was conductor of The Kansas City Civic Orchestra and of the UMKC student orchestra and director of The Kansas City Contemporary Players

From 1981 until 2010 Raymond Luedeke was Associate Principal Clarinet of the Toronto Symphony. While in that position, he won a Canada wide contest to compose an orchestral fanfare that would open Roy Thomson Hall, since 1982 the home of the TSO. He would later receive numerous grants from Canadian Arts Coumcils, (Canada Council for the Arts, Laidlaw Foundation, Ontario Arts Council, Toronto Arts Council)

== Music ==
The music of Ray Luedeke, along with traditional elements, incorporates a variety of the techniques of 20th and 21st Century music, including metric modulation, extended or ambiguous tonality, spatial notation, and the harmonic use of pitch sets. A good deal of his music is inspired by poetry, particularly that of Pablo Neruda and of William Carlos Williams. Some of his music includes references to the music of non-Western cultures, to Japanese classical music, to African drumming, and to the Indonesian gamelan.

In Kevin Vigil's doctoral thesis on the guitar music of Raymond Luedeke, the composer is asked if he has had style periods, given the variety of forms found in his music: He replies that his style is to be found in his musical line and in his personal concept of counterpoint, rather than in his musical vocabulary, which may vary. He compares his music to poetry, in which metaphors may be interpreted in various ways. He does not accept the concept of absolute music, of music that only refers to itself. Without being programmatic, his music has a narrative that can suggest a variety of interpretations.

== Partial list of compositions ==
- Operas and music theater
  - My Life with Pablo Neruda – opera-cabaret in 4 acts
  - Butterfly's Trouble – opera cabaret based on Puccini's Madama Butterfly
  - Wild Flowers – opera in 2 acts based on Iron Hans (The Brothers Grimm)
  - The Magical Singing Drum – opera-cabaret based on an African story
  - The Art of Love / Into the Labyrinth for 2 pianos and actor (Ovid Ars Amatoria and other works)
  - Kafka Shorts – music theatre for string quartet and 2 actors**In Kharms Way – music theatre for string quartet and 2 actors
  - Garbage Delight – music theatre for saxophone quintet with narration
  - Wonderland Duets for 2 tubas and narrator (Lewis Carroll)
- Orchestra
  - Circus Music
  - Ah, Matsushima!
  - The Transparency of Time for piano and orchestra
  - Concerto for Double Bass
  - Concerto for Violin
  - The North Wind's Gift
  - Tales of the Netsilik – for narrator and orchestra
  - Clockworks
  - Shadow Music
  - Fanfare for 12 herald trumpets and large orchestra
  - Concerto for Saxophone Quartet
  - 4 Cantos
- Chamber Orchestra
  - Hard Right
  - In This World for string orch., flute, and marimba
  - Little Rose
  - Chamber Symphony
- Chorus
  - Love is the every only god – on poems by e. e. cummings
  - In Just Spring for Children's Chorus – on poems by e. e. cummings
  - Prayers, Poems, and Incantations for the Earth for chorus and children's chorus
  - Disasters of the Sun for gamelan and chamber chorus – poems by Dorothy Livesay
  - A Prayer for the Earth for chorus and orchestra
  - Four Songs, The Dream and Old Song – on poems by Dorothy Livesay
  - Of Him I Love for chorus SATB, Saxophone Quartet, double bass, percussion
- Vocal Solo
  - Livesay Songs for soprano and piano – on poems by Dorothy Livesay
  - Whispers of Heavenly Death for 2 sopranos and piano – poems by Walt Whitman
  - Pictures from Breughel – for soprano, baritone, WW Quintet – William Carlos Williams
  - New Hampshire and His Majesty the Tuba for tuba, tenor and piano
- Large Ensemble
  - The Winds of Her Misfortune for orchestra brass, woodwind, and perc. sections
  - In This World for string orchestra and marimba
  - Circus Music for brass band
  - Cathedrals for brass ensemble
  - Echoland for mixed ensemble
  - Soundscapes for concert band
  - Krishna for tuba (or piano) and percussion
  - Rondo for trumpet and band
- Chamber Music
  - Ysaye Does It for 4 violins
  - Questions for flute, viola, double bass, and narrator
  - Tango Dreams for string trio and accordion
  - Brother Jack for vln., E. Hn., harpsichord
  - Ceremonial Dances for piano and string quartet
  - The Moon in the Labyrinth for harp and string quartet
  - The Lyre of Orpheus for harp and string quartet (or 2 Harps)
  - Elemental Dances for guitar and string quartet
  - String Quartet – inspired by a poem of William Carlos Williams
  - Nocturnal Variations for woodwind quintet**Serenade for oboe, cello and piano
  - Serenade for oboe, cello and piano
  - Little Suite for 3 horns
  - Macchu Picchu for flute (alto flute), clarinet (Bb, A, Eb), violin and piano
  - Quintet for Brass / Complexity and Contradiction
  - Mystery Madrigals for flute (piccolo), clarinet (Bb, A, Eb), violin, cello and perc.
  - Divertimenti 1 and 2 for 2 clarinets and bassoon
  - From the Mountain Top for trombone quartet
  - Joy, fanfare for brass quintet
- Duos
  - Fancies and Interludes I for tuba and piano
  - Fancies and Interludes II for alto sax. and piano
  - Fancies and Interludes III for horn and percussion
  - Fancies and Interludes IV for bass clarinet and percussion
  - Fancies and Interludes V for cello and organ
  - Fancies and Interludes VI for violin and piano
  - Fancies and Interludes VII for bassoon and piano
  - Ah, Matsushima! for violin and marimba with narration (Japanese haiku)
  - Paprika for bassoon and cello
  - If You Forget Me for cello (or viola) and piano
  - Sonata for viola and piano
  - In This World for flute (or violin or clarinet) and marimba **In the Eye of the Cat for flute (or violin) and guitar
  - In the Eye of the Cat for flute (or violin) and guitar
  - Brief Encounters for viola and piano
  - Serenity for clarinet (or soprano saxophone) and accordion
  - Fairy Tales for flute and harp
  - Silence! for percussion and oboe (or flute or clarinet or viola or cello or voice)
  - Body Language for 2 percussion
  - Aurora for flute and harp
  - Duo for oboe and cello
  - Horn Calls for 2 horns
  - 15 Inventions for 2 clarinets
  - 8 Bagatelles for 2 Tubas
- Solo
  - Grief for solo cello
  - Tango Dreams for piano
  - My Secret Life for viola
  - 12 Preludes for piano
  - 5 Preludes for guitar
  - Fantasy for piano
- Arrangements
  - Gipsy Songs (Dvorak) for woodwind quintet
  - Ragtime (various composers) for woodwind quintet
  - Le Tombeau de Couperin (Ravel) for oboe (or clarinet), violin, cello, and accordion
  - Carnival of Venice for clarinet and orchestra (clarinet part by Paul JeanJean)
  - The Heart and Soul of Tango, 9 tangos for string trio, accordion, and bs-baritone
  - Amazing Grace for orchestra, bagpipes, and student violins
  - The Blue Danube (J. Strauss) for clarinet and string quartet
  - First Clarinet Concerto for solo clarinet and wind ens. (Carl Maria von Weber)
  - Four Nocturnes (Poulenc) for string orchestra

== Further Reference ==
- Suppan, Armin Suppan: Das Neue Lexikon des Blasmusikwesens, 4. Auflage, Freiburg-Tiengen, Blasmusikverlag Schulz GmbH, 1994, ISBN 3-923058-07-1
- Paul E. Bierley, William H. Rehrig: The heritage encyclopedia of band music : composers and their music, Westerville, Ohio: Integrity Press, 1991, ISBN 0-918048-08-7
- Carolyn Beatty, Mark Hand, Simone Auer, Ned Bouhalassa, Mireille Gagne, Gilles Marois, Veronique Robert: Repertoire des compositeurs, Toronto: Centre de Musique Canadiene, 1989.
- Londeix, Jean-Marie: Musique pour saxophone, volume II : répertoire général des oeuvres et des ouvrages d' enseignement pour le saxophone, Cherry Hill: Roncorp Publications, 1985.
- Anderson, E. Ruth: Contemporary American composers - A biographical dictionary, Second edition, Boston: G. K. Hall, 1982, 578 p., ISBN 978-0-816-18223-7
