= Erik Kofoed-Hansen =

Danish fencer

Personal information
- Nationality: Danish
- Born: 30 January 1897 Copenhagen, Denmark
- Died: 5 March 1965 (aged 68) Lyngby-Taarbæk, Denmark

Sport
- Sport: Fencing
- Club: Idrætsforeningen for Søværnets officerer

Erik Kofoed-Hansen (30 January 1897 – 5 March 1965) was a Danish fencer and naval officer. He competed in five events at the 1932 Summer Olympics.
