= Stanley Butler =

British cyclist (1910–1993)

Stanley Meredith Butler
Personal information
- Born: 5 March 1910 Lambeth, London, England
- Died: 24 May 1993 Bromley, London, England

Cycling career
- Sport: Cycling

Stanley Butler (5 March 1910 – 24 May 1993) was a British cyclist. He competed in the individual and team road race events at the 1932 Summer Olympics.

Born in 1910 in West Norwood, Butler cycled with the Norwood Paragon team, and competed with his team-mate Frank Southall in tandem-paced racing at Herne Hill velodrome. In the 1932 Olympics, the team rode cross-country en route to the competition when Butler was injured during a training ride in Toronto. Consequently, he started the 100 km (62.14 miles) Olympic road race badly handicapped. Nonetheless, he competed and supported the Chambers brothers, Ernest and Stanley, who won silver medals in the tandem sprint. Britain finished fourth in the four kilometres team pursuit. After World War II he won the national 24-hours time trial championship in 1950, covering 458.18 miles (19.09 mph) in atrocious weather conditions to set a new British record.
