= Bruno Pellizzari =

Italian cyclist (1907–1991)

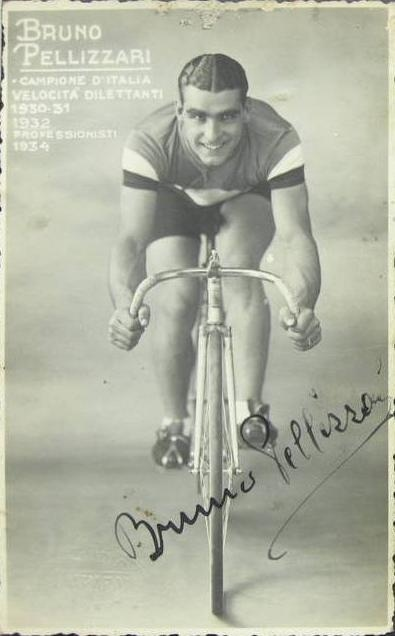

Personal information
- Full name: Bruno Pellizzari
- Born: 5 November 1907 Milan, Italy
- Died: 22 December 1991 (aged 84) Milan, Italy

Cycling career
- Sport: Cycling
- Discipline: Track
- Role: Rider

Professional team
- 1932–1933: Dei
Medal record
Men's track cycling
Representing Italy
Olympic Games
Bronze medal – third place	1932 Los Angeles	Individual sprint

Bruno Pellizzari (5 November 1907 – 22 December 1991) was a racing cyclist from Italy. He competed for Italy in the 1932 Summer Olympics held in Los Angeles, United States in the individual sprint event where he finished in third place.
