= Julius Maus =

German cyclist

Personal information
- Born: 10 December 1906 Immenhausen, Germany
- Died: 8 September 1934 (aged 27) Atlantic Ocean

Cycling career
- Sport: Cycling

Julius Maus (10 December 1906 – 8 September 1934) was a German cyclist. He competed in the individual and team road race events at the 1932 Summer Olympics. He died in a fire on board the SS Morro Castle.
