= Alfhild Cnattingius =

Swedish suffragist and writer (1847–1932)

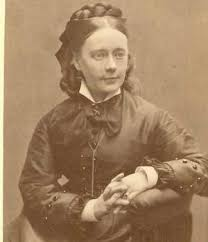
- Cnattingius in 1911
- Born: 1 June 1847; Skänninge, Östergötland, Sweden
- Died: 1 April 1932 (aged 84); Nora, Västmanland, Sweden
- Organization: National Association for Women's Suffrage

Alfhild Charlotta Cnattingius (1 June 1847 – 1 April 1932) was a Swedish suffragist, trade unionist and writer.

== Biography ==
Cnattingius was born on 1 June 1847 in Skänninge, Östergötland, Sweden. Her father was alderman and mayor Claes Johan Cnattingius and her mother was Charlotte Stålhane. She became a suffragist and writer.

Cnattingius was president of the National Association for Women's Suffrage in Nora, Västmanland, Sweden. She was one of the first two women in the Nora city council (1912 to 1918). She also worked as a telegraph commissioner campaigned for workers to receive higher wages, through working in the local trade union.

Cnattingius wrote memoirs about Nils Ignell (1806–1864) [sv].

Cnattingius died on 1 April 1932 in Nora, Västmanland, Sweden.
