= Luigi Consonni (cyclist) =

Italian cyclist

Personal information
- Born: 21 June 1905 Briosco, Italy
- Died: 17 May 1992 (aged 86)

Cycling career
- Sport: Cycling

Luigi Consonni (21 June 1905 – 17 May 1992) was an Italian cyclist. He competed in the time trial event at the 1932 Summer Olympics.
