= Mario Gruppioni =

Italian wrestler (1901–1939)

Medal record

Men's Greco-Roman wrestling

Representing Italy

Olympic Games
Bronze medal – third place	1932 Los Angeles	Light heavyweight

Mario Gruppioni (13 September 1901 – 17 January 1939) was an Italian wrestler and Olympic medalist in Greco-Roman wrestling.

== Olympics ==
Gruppioni competed at the 1932 Summer Olympics in Los Angeles where he received a bronze medal in Greco-Roman wrestling, the light heavyweight class.
