= Gunnar Andersen (cyclist) =

Danish cyclist (1911–1981)

Personal information
- Born: 12 May 1911 Copenhagen, Denmark
- Died: 13 November 1981 (aged 70) Sjælland, Denmark

Cycling career
- Sport: Cycling

Gunnar Tycho Langhof Andersen (12 May 1911 – 13 November 1981) was a Danish cyclist. He competed in the individual road race event at the 1932 Summer Olympics.
