= Cycling at the 1932 Summer Olympics – Men's team time trial =

Cycling - Men's team time trial at the Games of the X Olympiad
- Venue: Moorpark-Roosevelt Highway (Oxnard)-Santa Monica
- Dates: August 4, 1932
- Competitors: 24 (individuals) 8 (teams) from 8 nations

Medalists
| 1st place, gold medalist(s) | | Attilio Pavesi; Guglielmo Segato; Giuseppe Olmo; Italy |
| 2nd place, silver medalist(s) | | Frode Sørensen; Leo Nielsen; Henry Hansen; Denmark |
| 3rd place, bronze medalist(s) | | Bernhard Britz; Sven Höglund; Arne Berg; Sweden |

The men's team time trial cycling event at the 1932 Olympic Games took place on August 4. It was competed in a 100 km time trial format. Team time taken as sum of the team's three best finishers.

== Results ==
=== Final ===
| Rank | Name | Nationality | Time | Notes |
|---|---|---|---|---|
| 1st place, gold medalist(s) | Attilio Pavesi; Guglielmo Segato; Giuseppe Olmo | Italy | 7:27:15.2 | |
| 2nd place, silver medalist(s) | Frode Sørensen; Leo Nielsen; Henry Hansen | Denmark | 7:38:50.2 | |
| 3rd place, bronze medalist(s) | Bernhard Britz; Sven Höglund; Arne Berg | Sweden | 7:39:12.6 | |
| 4 | Frank Southall; Charles Holland; Stanley Butler | Great Britain | 7:44:53.0 | |
| 5 | Paul Chocque; Amédée Fournier; Henri Mouillefarine | France | 7:46:31.8 | |
| 6 | Henry O'Brien, Jr. Frank Connell; Otto Luedeke | United States | 7:51:55.6 | |
| 7 | Glen Robbins; James Jackson; Frank Elliott | Canada | 8:01:38.0 | |
| 8 | Werner Wittig; Julius Maus; Hubert Ebner | Germany | 8:21:21.2 | |
