= Charles Rampelberg =

French cyclist

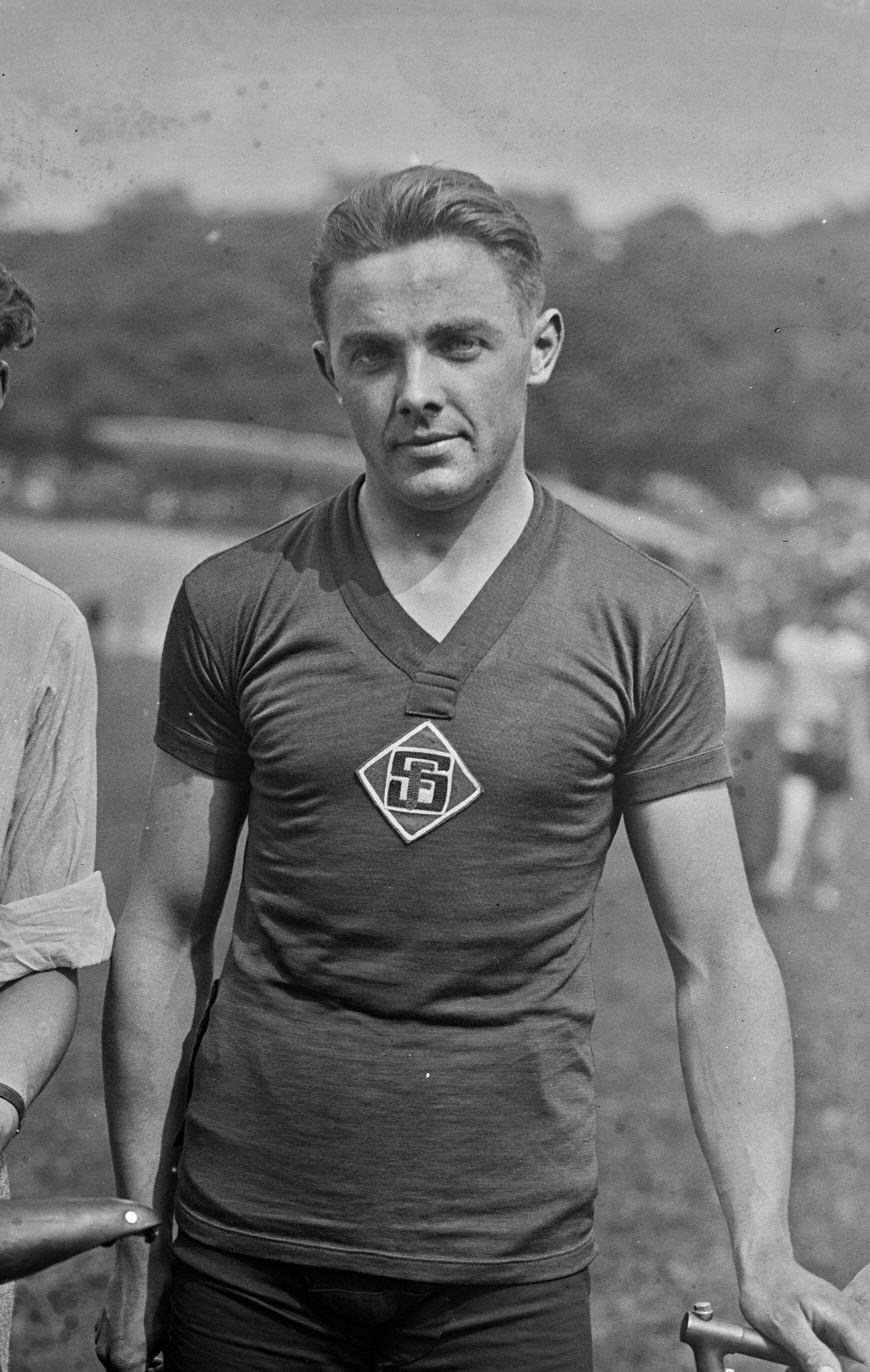

Personal information
- Born: 11 November 1909 Tourcoing, France
- Died: 18 March 1982 (aged 72) Perthes, France

Cycling career
- Sport: Cycling
Medal record
Representing FRA
Men's cycling
Olympic Games
Bronze medal – third place	1932 Los Angeles	1000 m time trial

Charles Rampelberg (11 October 1909 – 18 March 1982) was a French cyclist who competed at the 1932 Summer Olympics. He won the bronze medal in the men's 1000 m time trial.
