= Maurice Perrin (cyclist) =

French cyclist

Personal information
- Born: 26 October 1911 Paris, France
- Died: 2 January 1992 (aged 80) Plaisir, France

Cycling career
- Sport: Cycling
Medal record
Representing FRA
Men's cycling
Olympic Games
| Gold medal – first place | 1932 Los Angeles | Tandem |

Maurice Perrin (26 October 1911 – 2 January 1992) was a French cyclist. He won a gold medal in the tandem event at the 1932 Summer Olympics.
