= Werner Wittig (cyclist) =

German cyclist (1909–1992)

Personal information
- Born: 23 May 1909 Germany
- Died: 4 February 1992 (aged 82) Paterson, New Jersey, United States

Cycling career
- Sport: Cycling

Werner Wittig (23 May 1909 – 4 February 1992) was a German cyclist. He competed in the individual and team road race events at the 1932 Summer Olympics.
