= Axel Bloch =

Danish fencer

Personal information
- Born: 5 May 1911 Copenhagen, Denmark
- Died: 6 May 1998 (aged 87) Aarhus, Denmark

Sport
- Sport: Fencing

Axel Bloch (5 May 1911 – 6 May 1998) was a Danish fencer. He competed in five events at the 1932 Summer Olympics.. He was the flag bearer for his country at that Olympics.
