= Hubert Ebner =

German cyclist

Personal information
- Born: 26 March 1906 Germany
- Died: 26 June 1990 (aged 84) Orange Beach, Alabama, United States

Cycling career
- Sport: Cycling

Hubert Ebner (26 March 1906 – 26 June 1990) was a German cyclist. He competed in the individual and team road race events at the 1932 Summer Olympics.
