= Georges Conan =

French cyclist

Personal information
- Born: 6 March 1913 Paris, France
- Died: 31 January 2000 (aged 86)

Cycling career
- Sport: Cycling

Georges Conan (6 March 1913 – 31 January 2000) was a French cyclist. He competed in the individual road race event at the 1932 Summer Olympics. He also rode in the 1936 Tour de France.
