= Louis Chaillot =

French cyclist (1914–1998)

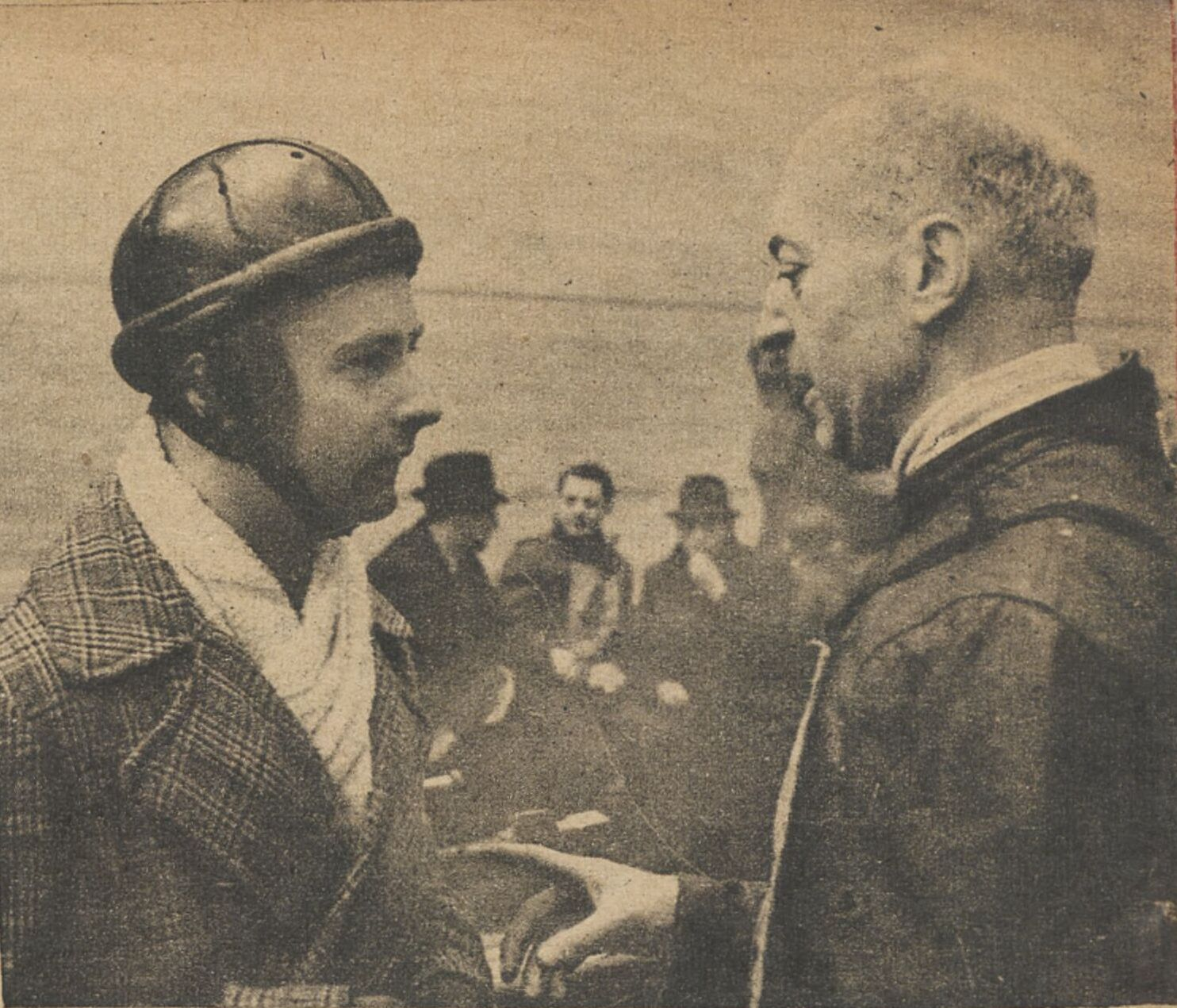
- Chaillot (left) in 1942

Personal information
- Born: 2 March 1914 Chaumont, France
- Died: 28 January 1998 (aged 83) Aubenas, France

Cycling career
- Sport: Cycling
Medal record
Representing FRA
Men's cycling
Olympic Games
Gold medal – first place	1932 Los Angeles	Tandem
Silver medal – second place	1932 Los Angeles	Individual sprint
Bronze medal – third place	1936 Berlin	Individual sprint

Louis Chaillot (French: [lwi ʃajo]; 2 March 1914 – 28 January 1998) was a cyclist from France. He was born in Chaumont, France.

He competed for France in the 1932 Summer Olympics held in Los Angeles, United States in the tandem event where he finished in first place and in the individual sprint event where he finished in second place.

He also competed in the 1936 Summer Olympics held in Berlin, Germany in the individual sprint event but was only able to finish in third place.
