= Jacobus van Egmond =

Dutch cyclist (1908–1969)

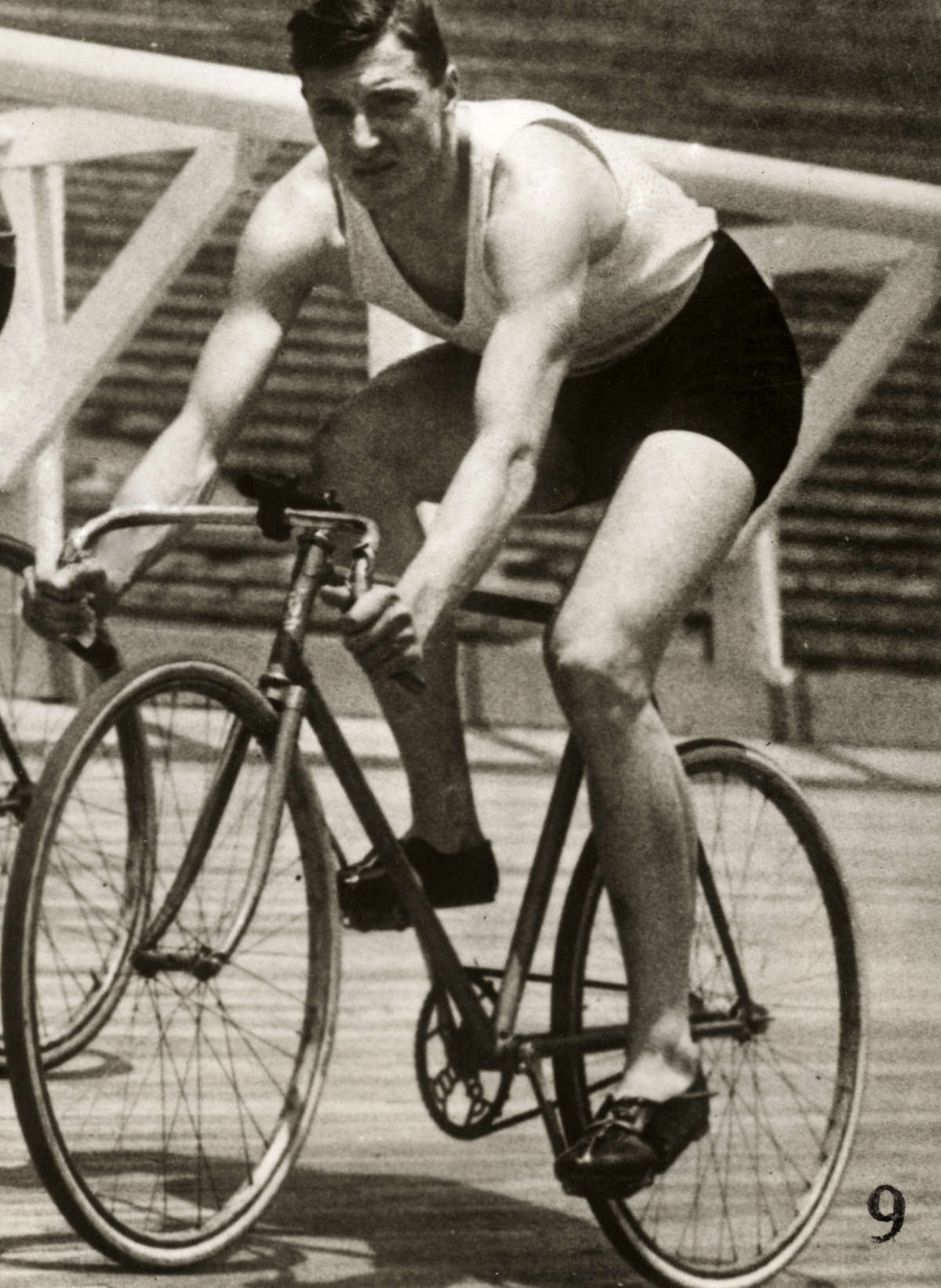
- Jacques van Egmond in 1932

Personal information
- Born: 17 February 1908 Haarlem, Netherlands
- Died: 9 January 1969 (aged 60) Haarlem, Netherlands
- Height: 193 cm (6 ft 4 in)

Cycling career
- Sport: Cycling
Medal record
Representing NED
Olympic Games
Gold medal – first place	1932 Los Angeles	Sprint
Silver medal – second place	Los Angeles 1932	1000 m time trial
World Championships
Gold medal – first place	1933 Paris	Sprint

Jacobus van Egmond (17 February 1908 – 9 January 1969) was a Dutch track cyclist who competed at the 1932 Summer Olympics. He won a gold medal in the sprint and a silver in the 1000 m time trial; he finished fourth in the tandem, together with Bernard Leene.

Van Egmond took up sports after the 1928 Olympics, and first trained in running. He then changed to track cycling and won the national sprint title in 1931 and 1932. At the 1932 Olympics he went flat out in the sprint and time trial, and had no power left for the tandem event. Next year he won the world title in the sprint. He turned professional in 1934, and won the national sprint titles in 1934-36. Beginning in 1938, he ran a grocery store and then a self-service laundry. In 1954 he opened Café van Egmond, which was later managed by his son Paul, who was a professional football player.

== See also ==
- List of Dutch Olympic cyclists
