= Jean Földeák =

German Olympic medalist in wrestling

Medal record

Men's Greco-Roman wrestling

Representing Germany

Olympic Games
Silver medal – second place	1932 Los Angeles	Middleweight

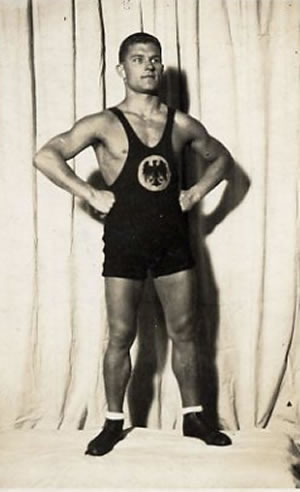
Jean Földeák

Jean Földeák (9 June 1903 – 5 March 1993) was a German wrestler who competed in the 1932 Summer Olympics. He was born in Hitiaş near Temesvar.
