= Folke Nilsson (cyclist) =

Swedish cyclist

Personal information
- Born: 23 June 1907 Uppsala, Sweden
- Died: 21 June 1980 (aged 72) Uppsala, Sweden

Cycling career
- Sport: Cycling

Folke Nilsson (23 June 1907 – 21 June 1980) was a Swedish cyclist. He competed in the individual road race event at the 1932 Summer Olympics.
