= Konrad Miersch =

German modern pentathlete

Personal information
- Born: 19 January 1907 Bad Freienwalde, Province of Brandenburg, Prussia, German Empire
- Died: 2 March 1942 (aged 35) Lyuban, Leningrad, Russia

Sport
- Sport: Modern pentathlon

Konrad Miersch (19 January 1907 – 2 March 1942) was a German modern pentathlete. He competed at the 1932 Summer Olympics. He was killed in action during World War II.
