= Johan Gabriel Oxenstierna (pentathlete) =

Swedish modern pentathlete and naval officer

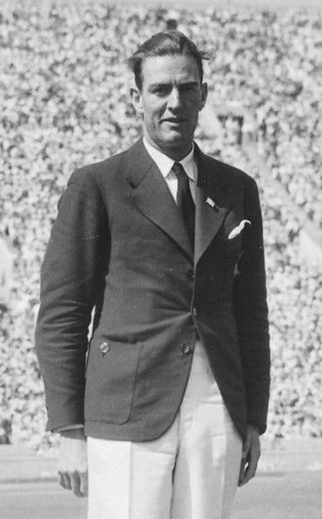
- At the 1932 Summer Olympics in Los Angeles, California, USA

Personal information
- Nationality: Swedish
- Born: 28 August 1899 Stockholm, Sweden
- Died: 18 July 1995 (aged 95) Täby, Sweden

Sport
- Country: Sweden
- Sport: Modern pentathlon
- Club: Flottans IF, Karlskrona
Medal record
Representing Sweden
Olympic Games
Gold medal – first place	1932 Los Angeles	Individual

Johan Gabriel Oxenstierna af Korsholm och Wasa (28 August 1899 – 18 July 1995) was a Swedish modern pentathlete and naval officer. He won a gold medal at the 1932 Summer Olympics.

Oxenstierna belonged to one of the oldest noble families of Sweden, which is known from the 13th century. In 1917 he became a Navy officer and in 1932 appointed naval attaché in Paris; upon his return to Sweden he was promoted to lieutenant commander. During World War II he served as a defence attaché in London. His enciphered cables to his government were treacherously passed on to the Germans by a code clerk in Stockholm who deciphered them, becoming a major source of naval intelligence to the Nazi regime. He retired in 1954 in the rank of sea captain.

In 1922 Oxenstierna married Görel Elisabeth Huitfeldt; they had two sons and one daughter. They divorced in 1946, and Oxenstierna remarried the same year. His granddaughter Anna Oxenstierna is a former professional golfer.
