= Bernhard Britz =

Swedish cyclist (1906–1935)

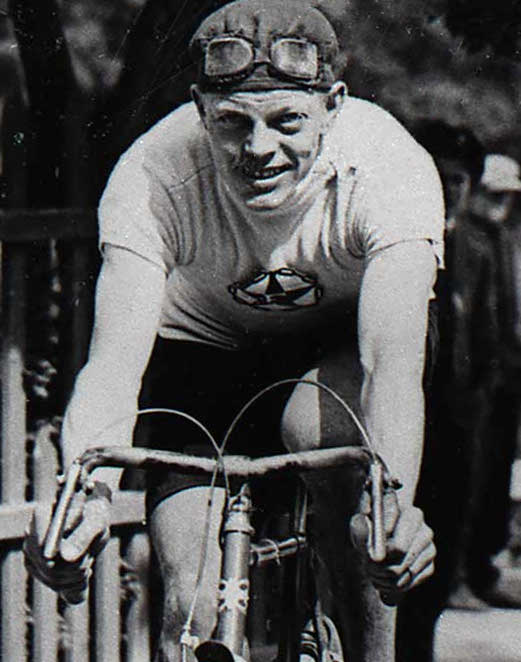

Personal information
- Born: 27 March 1906 Skänninge, Sweden
- Died: 31 May 1935 (aged 29) Västra Götaland, Sweden

Sport
- Sport: Cycling
- Club: IF Thor; SK Fryrishof; IFK Enskede, Stockholm
Medal record
Representing SWE
Olympic Games
Bronze medal – third place	1932 Los Angeles	Ind. road race
Bronze medal – third place	1932 Los Angeles	Team road race
- Updated on 7 June 2014

Bernhard Rudolf Britz (27 March 1906 – 31 May 1935) was a Swedish road racing cyclist who won bronze medals in the individual and team road races at the 1932 Summer Olympics. Between 1927 and 1933 he won nine national titles, three individual and six in teams. He was also an innovator and developed a bicycle gear, though without much commercial success.

He died after a collision with a truck in a cycling race in 1935.
