= Helmuth Naudé =

German modern pentathlete

Personal information
- Born: 30 November 1904 Danzig, West Prussia, Germany (now Gdańsk, Poland)
- Died: 3 February 1943 (aged 38)

Sport
- Sport: Modern pentathlon

Helmuth Naudé (30 November 1904 – 3 February 1943) was a German modern pentathlete. He competed at the 1932 Summer Olympics. He was an Obert with the German Army and killed in action during World War II.
