= Grete Olsen =

Danish fencer

Personal information
- Born: 18 February 1912 Copenhagen, Denmark
- Died: 6 April 2010 (aged 98)

Sport
- Sport: Fencing

Grete Olsen (18 February 1912 – 6 April 2010) was a Danish fencer. She competed in the women's individual foil event at the 1932, 1936 and 1948 Summer Olympics.
