= José Morales (pentathlete) =

Mexican modern pentathlete (1901–??)

Personal information
- Born: 1901

Sport
- Sport: Modern pentathlon

José Morales (born 1901, date of death unknown) was a Mexican modern pentathlete. He competed at the 1932 Summer Olympics.
