= Vernon Barlow =

British modern pentathlete (1909–1975)

Personal information
- Born: 5 November 1909; Derry, Ireland
- Died: 24 October 1975 (aged 65); Greenwich, London

Sport
- Sport: Modern pentathlon

Vernon Barlow (5 November 1909 – 24 October 1975) was a British modern pentathlete. He competed at the 1932 Summer Olympics. In 1944, he was awarded with the OBE.
