= Arne Berg (cyclist) =

Swedish cyclist

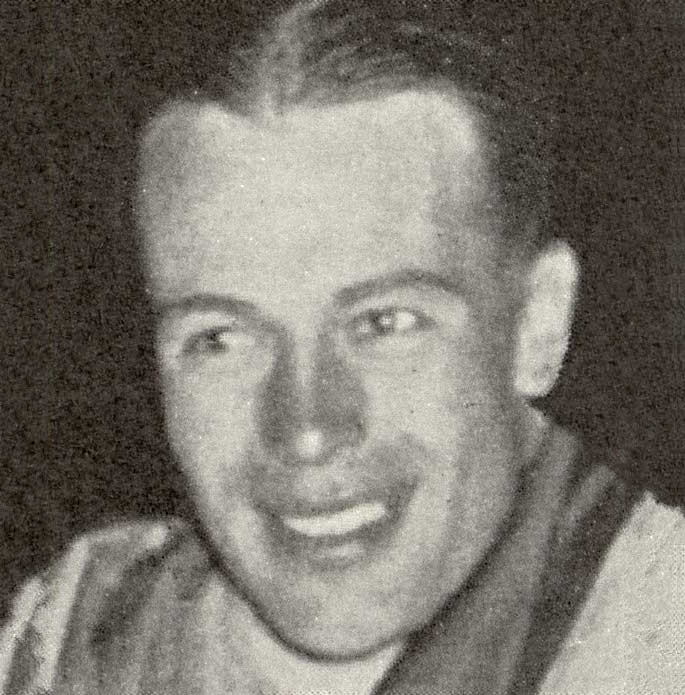

Personal information
- Full name: Axel Arne Berg
- Born: 3 December 1909 Stockholm, Sweden
- Died: 15 February 1997 (aged 87) Stockholm, Sweden

Cycling career
- Sport: Cycling
Medal record
Men's cycling
Representing Sweden
Olympic Games
Bronze medal – third place	1932 Los Angeles	Team road race

Axel Arne Berg (3 December 1909 – 15 February 1997) was a Swedish road racing cyclist who competed in the 1932 and 1936 Summer Olympics. In 1932 he finished 20th individually and won a team bronze medal. Four years later he finished 16th in the individual road race. The Swedish road racing team was unplaced, because Berg was the only Swedish finisher.

After retiring from competitions Berg worked as a motor mechanic.
