= Willi Remer =

German modern pentathlete (1908–1947)

Personal information
- Born: 27 July 1908 Rostock, Germany
- Died: 9 July 1947 (aged 38)

Sport
- Sport: Modern pentathlon

Willi Remer (27 July 1908 – 9 July 1947) was a German modern pentathlete. He competed at the 1932 Summer Olympics.
