= Gerda Munck =

Danish fencer

Personal information
- Full name: Gerda Agnete Munck
- Born: Höpfner; 2 January 1901 Kolding, Denmark
- Died: 24 December 1986 (aged 85) Risskov, Denmark
- Height: 168 cm (5 ft 6 in)

Sport
- Sport: Fencing
- Team: Fægteklubben Cirklen

Gerda Munck (née Höpfner; 2 January 1901 – 24 December 1986) was a Danish fencer. She competed in the women's individual foil event at the 1932 Summer Olympics.

Representing Fægteklubben Cirklen, she was part of the team that won the European fleuret championship in 1932 in Copenhagen.
