= Stanley Chambers =

British cyclist

Personal information
- Full name: Stanley Chambers
- Born: 13 September 1910 Hackney, England
- Died: 14 August 1991 (aged 80) Brighton and Hove, England

Cycling career
- Sport: Cycling
- Discipline: Track
- Role: Rider
- Rider type: Tandem
Medal record
Representing Great Britain
Men's Track cycling
Silver medal – second place	1932 Los Angeles	Tandem

Stanley Chambers (13 September 1910 – 14 August 1991) was a British cyclist who competed in the 1932 Summer Olympics. Born in Hackney, London, he was the brother of Ernest Chambers. The two brothers rode together to win the silver medal in the tandem sprint event.
