= Sven Höglund =

Swedish cyclist

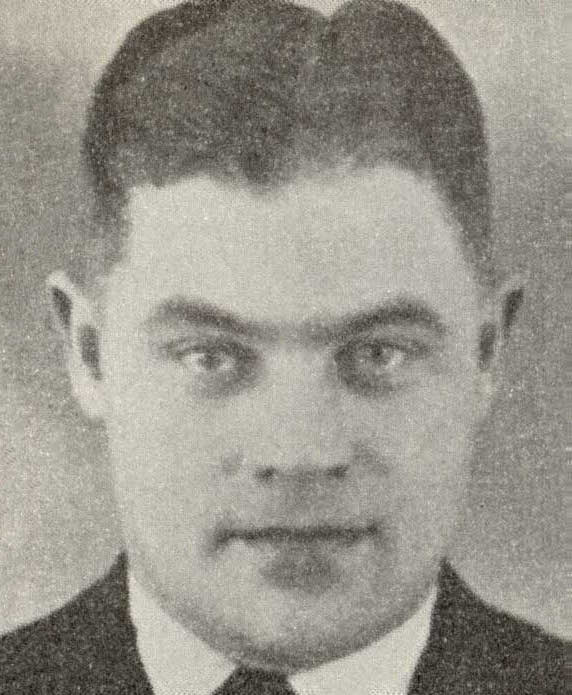

Personal information
- Born: 23 October 1910 Vendel, Sweden
- Died: 21 August 1995 (aged 84) Upplands Väsby, Sweden

Cycling career
- Sport: Cycling

Amateur team
- Hammarby IF
Medal record
Representing SWE
Men's cycling
Olympic Games
Bronze medal – third place	1932 Los Angeles	Team road race

Sven Gustaf Alvar Höglund (23 October 1910 – 21 August 1995) was a Swedish cyclist who competed in the 1932 Summer Olympics. He finished eighth in the individual road race and won a bronze medal with the Swedish team. He won the team road race at the Swedish championships of 1935 and 1936 and at the 1933 Nordic Championship, where he finished second individually.

Höglund was born in Vendel (in present-day Tierp Municipality), represented Hammarby IF, and died in Upplands Väsby.
