= Ernest Chambers (cyclist) =

English track cyclist (1907–1985)

- Chambers competing in 1928 Olympics

Personal information
- Full name: Ernest Henry Chambers
- Born: 7 April 1907 Hackney, England, United Kingdom
- Died: 29 January 1985 (aged 77)

Cycling career
- Sport: Cycling
- Discipline: Track
- Role: Rider
- Rider type: Tandem
Medal record
Men's track cycling
Representing Great Britain
Olympic Games
Silver medal – second place	1928 Amsterdam	Tandem
Silver medal – second place	1932 Los Angeles	Tandem

Ernest Henry Chambers (7 April 1907 – 29 January 1985) was an English track cyclist who won a silver medal at the 1928 Summer Olympics and the 1932 Summer Olympics. He also competed at the 1936 Summer Olympics.

He was born in the London borough of Hackney, and was the brother of Stanley Chambers. The two brothers rode together to win the silver medal in the tandem sprint event.

For some years Ernie Chambers owned a cycle shop in London Road Mitcham near Figges Marsh, adjacent to the Gardeners Arms public house.

== Palmarès ==
1928
2nd 1928 Summer Olympics - Tandem 2000 metres, with John Sibbit

1932
2nd 1932 Summer Olympics - Tandem 2000 metres, with Stanley Chambers
