= Harald Christensen (cyclist) =

Danish cyclist (1907–1994)

Personal information
- Born: 9 April 1907 Kolding, Denmark
- Died: 27 November 1994 (aged 87) Copenhagen, Denmark

Cycling career
- Sport: Cycling
Medal record
Representing DEN
Men's cycling
Olympic Games
Bronze medal – third place	1932 Los Angeles	Tandem

Harald Christensen (9 April 1907 – 27 November 1994) was a Danish cyclist who competed in the 1932 Summer Olympics. He won a bronze medal in the tandem event.
