= Frode Sørensen (cyclist) =

Danish cyclist (1912–1980)

Personal information
- Born: 8 February 1912 Copenhagen, Denmark
- Died: 1 August 1980 (aged 68) Stockholm, Sweden

Cycling career
- Sport: Cycling
Medal record
Representing DEN
Men's road bicycle racing
Olympic Games
Silver medal – second place	1932 Los Angeles	Team road race
World Championships
Silver medal – second place	1937 Copenhagen	Amateur's road race

Frode Sørensen (8 February 1912 – 1 August 1980) was a Danish cyclist who competed in the 1932 Summer Olympics and in the 1936 Summer Olympics. He won a silver medal in the team road race event in 1932.
