= Willy Gervin =

Danish cyclist (1903–1951)

Personal information
- Born: 28 November 1903 Copenhagen, Denmark
- Died: 8 July 1951 (aged 47) Roskilde, Denmark

Cycling career
- Sport: Cycling
Medal record
Representing DEN
Men's cycling
Olympic Games
| Bronze medal – third place | 1932 Los Angeles | Tandem |

Willy Gervin (28 November 1903 – 8 July 1951) was a Danish cyclist who competed in the 1932 Summer Olympics. He won a bronze medal in the tandem event.
