= Australia at the 1932 Summer Olympics =

- IOC code: AUS
- NOC: Australian Olympic Federation

in Los Angeles
- Competitors: 13 (9 men, 4 women) in six sports
- Flag bearer: Andrew Charlton
- Medals Ranked 10th: Gold 3 Silver 1 Bronze 1 Total 5

Summer Olympics appearances (overview)
- 1896; 1900; 1904; 1908; 1912; 1920; 1924; 1928; 1932; 1936; 1948; 1952; 1956; 1960; 1964; 1968; 1972; 1976; 1980; 1984; 1988; 1992; 1996; 2000; 2004; 2008; 2012; 2016; 2020; 2024

Other related appearances
- 1906 Intercalated Games –––– Australasia (1908–1912)

Australia competed at the 1932 Summer Olympics in Los Angeles, United States. Due to the Great Depression, Australia could only afford to send 13 athletes to the Games.

An innovation was the daily one-hour radio report on the Olympics for New Zealand and Australia by the film actress from New Zealand, Nola Luxford.

== Medalists ==
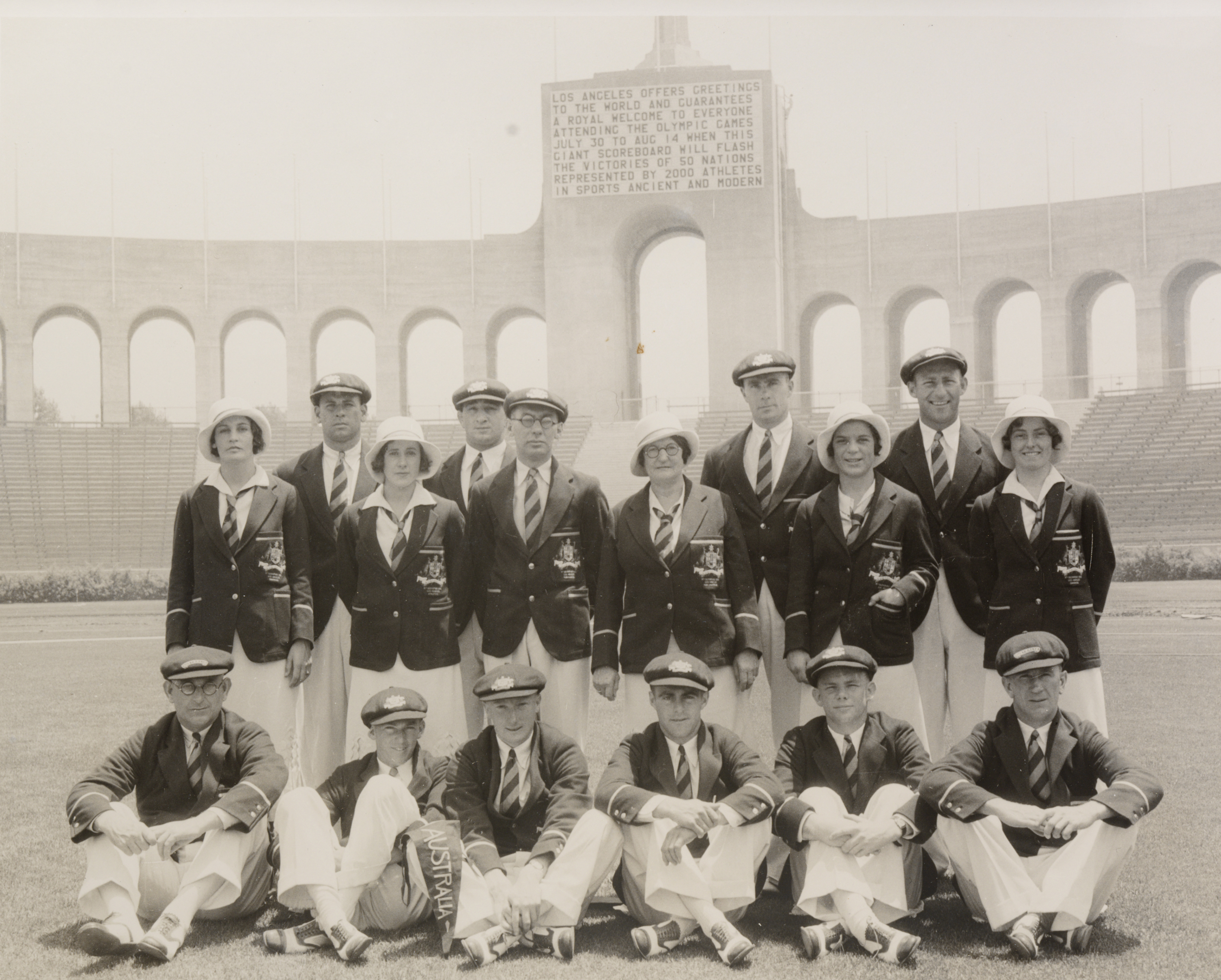
The Australian Olympic team at the Olympic Stadium, Los Angeles

=== Gold ===
- Dunc Gray – cycling, men's 1000 m time trial
- Bobby Pearce – rowing, men's single sculls
- Clare Dennis – swimming, women's 200 m breaststroke

=== Silver ===
- Bonnie Mealing – swimming, women's 100 m backstroke

=== Bronze ===
- Eddie Scarf – wrestling, men's freestyle light heavyweight

== Athletics ==
Key

- Note–Ranks given for track events are within the athlete's heat only
- Q = Qualified for the next round
- q = Qualified for the next round as a fastest loser or, in field events, by position without achieving the qualifying target
- NR = National record
- N/A = Round not applicable for the event
- Bye = Athlete not required to compete in round
- NP = Not placed

Men
Track & road events

Athlete	Event	Heat		Quarterfinal		Semifinal		Final	
Athlete	Event	Result	Rank	Result	Rank	Result	Rank	Result	Rank
George Golding	400 m	49.0	3 Q	48.6	3 Q	48.0	3 Q	48.8	6
George Golding	400 m hurdles	55.2	3 Q	—N/a		53.1	4	Did not advance	
Bill Barwick	1500 m	4:03.5	7	—N/a				Did not advance	
Alex Hillhouse	5000 m	15:14.0	6 Q	—N/a				15:15.0	10

Women
Track & road events

Athlete	Event	Heat		Semifinal		Final	
Athlete	Event	Result	Rank	Result	Rank	Result	Rank
Eileen Wearne	100 m	12.5	4	Did not advance			

== Cycling ==
Track cycling

Ranks given are within the heat.

Cyclist	Event	First round		Quarterfinals		Semifinals		Final	
Cyclist	Event	Result	Rank	Result	Rank	Result	Rank	Result	Rank
Dunc Gray	Sprint	13.2	1 Q	12.9	1 Q		2		4
Dunc Gray	Time trial	N/A						1:13.0 OR	1st place, gold medalist(s)

== Rowing ==
Rower	Event	First round		Final	
Rower	Event	Result	Rank	Result	Rank
Bobby Pearce	Single sculls	7:27.0	1 Q	7:44.4	1st place, gold medalist(s)

== Swimming ==
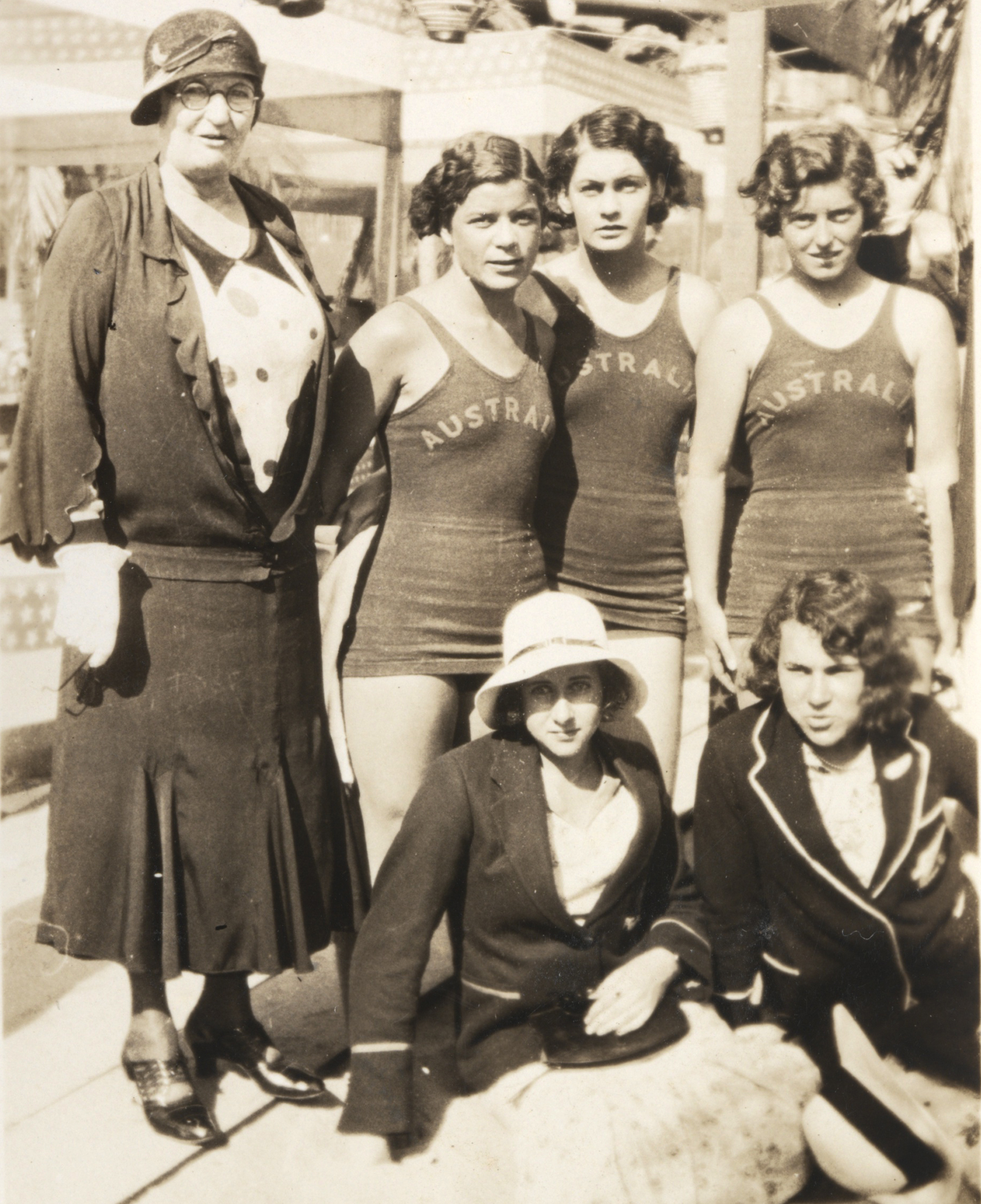
Members of the Australian & NZ team, 1932 Los Angeles Olympics. Mealing, Dennis, Bult, Mrs Chambers, Eileen Wearne and Thelma Kench (N.Z. sprinter).

Men

Ranks given are within the heat.

Swimmer	Event	Heats		Semifinals		Final	
Swimmer	Event	Result	Rank	Result	Rank	Result	Rank
Noel Ryan	100 m freestyle	1:02.9	4	Did not advance			
Boy Charlton	400 m freestyle	4:59.8	1 Q	5:02.1	3 Q	4:58.6	6
Noel Ryan	400 m freestyle	5:01.9	1 Q	4:59.7	5	Did not advance	
Boy Charlton	1500 m freestyle	20:09.5	3 Q	19:53.1	4	Did not advance	
Noel Ryan	1500 m freestyle	20:12.6	2 Q	19:52.5	3 Q	19:45.1	4

Women

Ranks given are within the heat.

Swimmer	Event	Heats		Semifinals		Final	
Swimmer	Event	Result	Rank	Result	Rank	Result	Rank
Frances Bult	100 m freestyle	1:11.4	3 q	1:10.2	2 Q	1:09.9	5
Frances Bult	400 m freestyle	6:03.0	3	Did not advance			
Bonnie Mealing	100 m backstroke	1:21.6	2 Q	—N/a		1:21.3	2nd place, silver medalist(s)
Clare Dennis	200 m breaststroke	3:08.2	1 Q OR	—N/a		3:06.3	(gold) OR

== Wrestling ==
Freestyle wrestling
Men's

Athlete	Event	Round 1	Round 2	Final	
Athlete	Event	Opposition Result	Opposition Result	Opposition Result	Rank
Eddie Scarf	Light heavyweight	Madison (CAN); W	Sjöstedt (SWE); L	Mehringer (USA); L	3rd place, bronze medalist(s)

== Art competitions ==
James Quinn competed in the mixed paintings category.
