= William Swank =

American author

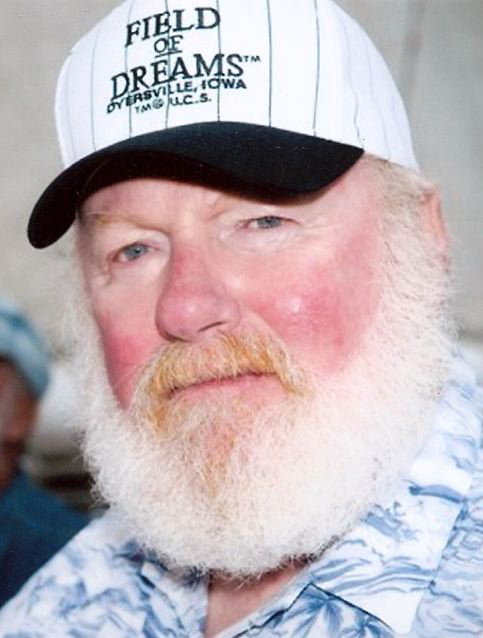
- Born: June 17, 1940 (age 85); Chicago, Illinois, US
- Occupation: Author
- Website: Baseball Santa

William George Swank Jr., more personally known as Bill Swank authored or co-authored of ten books and numerous articles primarily about baseball. The San Diego Historical Society identifies him as "San Diego's preeminent baseball historian."

== Life ==
Bill Swank was born in Chicago on June 17, 1940, to parents William George Swank and Estelle Jensen Swank. He received a Bachelor of Science degree from San Diego State College in 1962. He was a Supervising Probation Officer for the County of San Diego from 1963 to 1994. He has three children and two grandsons. He currently lives in San Diego, California, with his wife Jeri Lynne (Bessie) Swank, whom he married in 1986.

Swank has campaigned since 1988 to get San Diego's first major league baseball player and early home run king Gavy Cravath elected to Baseball's Hall of Fame. His scale model of Lane Field (built in 1997) is on permanent display at the San Diego Hall of Champions. Following the release of his award-winning book, Echoes from Lane Field (1999), Swank has extensively explored the history of baseball in San Diego and helped honor many local players including Pete Coscarart, Johnny Ritchey, Floyd Robinson, Manuel 'Nay' Hernandez and Ted Williams.

Swank has been Santa Claus for Christmas on the Prado in Balboa Park, San Diego, since 2002. He also volunteers as Santa for several other charitable organizations in San Diego. As "Baseball Santa," he played second base for the House of David from 2003 through 2008. In 2009, Baseball Santa began giving baseball equipment to Little Leagues in Mexico.

== Works ==
=== The Lane Field Padres, 1936-1946 and 1947-1957, (two volumes) ===
Published by the San Diego Padres and San Diego Baseball Historical Society, 1997; co-author Ray Brandes

=== Echoes from Lane Field ===
Turner Publishing Company, 1999. Winner, San Diego Press Club and San Diego Book Awards, 1999

=== Gold Leather Helmets, Black Hightop Shoes ===
Big League Press, 2003. Co-Author Bill Rice.

An Athletic History of Mission Bay High School During the 1950s. From a review by Don King, Historian of the San Diego Hall of Champions: "Bill Swank is San Diego's eminent baseball historian, but he's a couple tacos short of a combination plate. Mission Bay is a powerhouse today, but that wasn't the case when the school opened fifty years ago…and then it got worse. Why would somebody write about this? With painstaking research and a sense of humor, Swank and Bill Rice have created a time capsule of the 1950s. How did they ever find so much information about women's athletics from that era? You don't have to be a Buc to enjoy this book."

=== Baseball in San Diego (two books) ===
Baseball in San Diego; From the Padres to Petco, Arcadia Publishing, 2004 Baseball in San Diego; From the Plaza to the Padres, Arcadia Publishing, 2005

=== Bob Chandler's Tales from the San Diego Padres ===
Sports Publishing, 2006. Co-author Bob Chandler

=== The Life of Dion Rich: Live Like a Millionaire With No Money Down ===
Silver Threads, 2011. Co-author Charlie Jones.

=== Off Guard ===
Silver Threads, 2012. Co-author Walt Sweeney

=== Christmas in San Diego ===
Arcadia Publishing, 2015.

== Honors ==
- Winner, San Diego Press Club, History, for "Cruisin' with the Bay Park Boys" (2017)
- Winner, San Diego Press Club, Profile, for "Frye Wings" (2017)
- Winner, San Diego Press Club, Gardening, for "Dorothy Carroll, The Jacaranda Lady" (2017)
- Winner, San Diego Press Club, Sports, for "Clairemont's Long Forgotten Little League Ballfields" (2017)
- The National Academy of Television Arts & Sciences (Emmy Award), Pacific Southwest Chapter. Best Sports Documentary 2012: The First Padres. General Malaise Productions; William Swank, Associate Producer.
- Inspiration Award, Friends of Balboa Park, 2012.
- Winner, San Diego Press Club, 2015.
- Winner, San Diego Press Club, 1999.
- Winner, San Diego Book Awards, 1999
