= Mealing =

Mealing is a surname. Notable people with the surname include:

- Amanda Mealing (born 1967), British actress
- Bonnie Mealing (1912–2002), Australian freestyle and backstroke swimmer
- John Mealing (born 1942), British keyboards player, composer and arranger
- Maurice Mealing (1893-1918), British World War I flying ace
