= Swimming at the 1932 Summer Olympics – Women's 100 metre freestyle =

Women's 100 metre freestyle at the Games of the X Olympiad
- Venue: LA84 Foundation/John C. Argue Swim Stadium
- Date: August 6, 1932 (heats); August 7, 1932 (semifinals); August 8, 1932 (final)
- Competitors: 20 from 10 nations
- Winning time: 1:06.8 OR

Medalists
1st place, gold medalist(s)		Helene Madison	United States
2nd place, silver medalist(s)		Willy den Ouden	Netherlands
3rd place, bronze medalist(s)		Eleanor Saville	United States

The women's 100 metre freestyle was a swimming event held as part of the swimming at the 1932 Summer Olympics programme. It was the fifth appearance of the event, which was established in 1912. The competition was held on Saturday 6 August 1932 and on Monday 8 August 1932.

Twenty swimmers from ten nations competed.

== Records ==
These were the standing world and Olympic records (in minutes) prior to the 1932 Summer Olympics.

World record	1:06.6	(United States) Helene Madison	Boston (USA)	20 April 1931
Olympic record	1:11.0	(United States) Albina Osipowich	Amsterdam (NED)	11 August 1928

In the heats the Olympic record was broken in the second heat by Joyce Cooper with 1:09.0, in the third heat by Helene Madison with 1:08.9 and in the fourth heat Eleanor Saville with 1:08.5. In the first semi-final Willy den Ouden bettered the Olympic record with 1:07.6 and in the final Madison again set a new Olympic record with 1:06.8.

== Results ==
=== Heats ===
Saturday 6 August 1932: The fastest two in each heat and the fastest third-placed from across the heats advanced to the final.

Heat 1

Place	Swimmer	Time	Qual.
1	Corrie Laddé (NED)	1:12.1	Q
2	Yvonne Godard (FRA)	1:12.2	Q
3	Valerie Davies (GBR)	1:12.7	
4	Hatsuho Matsuzawa (JPN)	1:17.1	
5	Marjorie Linton (CAN)	1:19.9	

Heat 2

Place	Swimmer	Time	Qual.
1	Joyce Cooper (GBR)	1:09.0	Q OR
2	Josephine McKim (USA)	1:09.3	Q
3	Frances Bult (AUS)	1:11.4	q
4	Maria Vierdag (NED)	1:13.3	
5	Irene Mullen (CAN)	1:15.2	

Heat 3

Place	Swimmer	Time	Qual.
1	Helene Madison (USA)	1:08.9	Q OR
2	Jenny Maakal (RSA)	1:11.0	Q
3	Lilli Andersen (DEN)	1:11.6	
4	Edna Hughes (GBR)	1:15.1	
5	Kazue Kojima (JPN)	1:16.2	

Heat 4

Place	Swimmer	Time	Qual.
1	Eleanor Saville (USA)	1:08.5	Q OR
2	Willy den Ouden (NED)	1:09.2	Q
3	Yukie Arata (JPN)	1:16.1	
4	Irene Pirie (CAN)	1:16.3	
5	Maria Lenk (BRA)	1:25.8	

=== Semifinals ===
Sunday 7 August 1932: The fastest three in each semi-final advanced to the final.

Semifinal 1

Place	Swimmer	Time	Qual.
1	Willy den Ouden (NED)	1:07.6	Q OR
2	Eleanor Saville (USA)	1:08.8	Q
3	Josephine McKim (USA)	1:08.8	Q
4	Joyce Cooper (GBR)	1:09.2	
5	Yvonne Godard (FRA)	1:14.1	

Semifinal 2

Place	Swimmer	Time	Qual.
1	Helene Madison (USA)	1:09.9	Q
2	Frances Bult (AUS)	1:10.2	Q
3	Jenny Maakal (RSA)	1:10.6	Q
4	Corrie Laddé (NED)	1:11.8	

=== Final ===
Monday 8 August 1932:

Place	Swimmer	Time
1	Helene Madison (USA)	1:06.8 OR
2	Willy den Ouden (NED)	1:07.8
3	Eleanor Saville (USA)	1:08.2
4	Josephine McKim (USA)	1:09.3
5	Frances Bult (AUS)	1:09.9
6	Jenny Maakal (RSA)	1:10.8
