= Joan McSheehy =

American swimmer

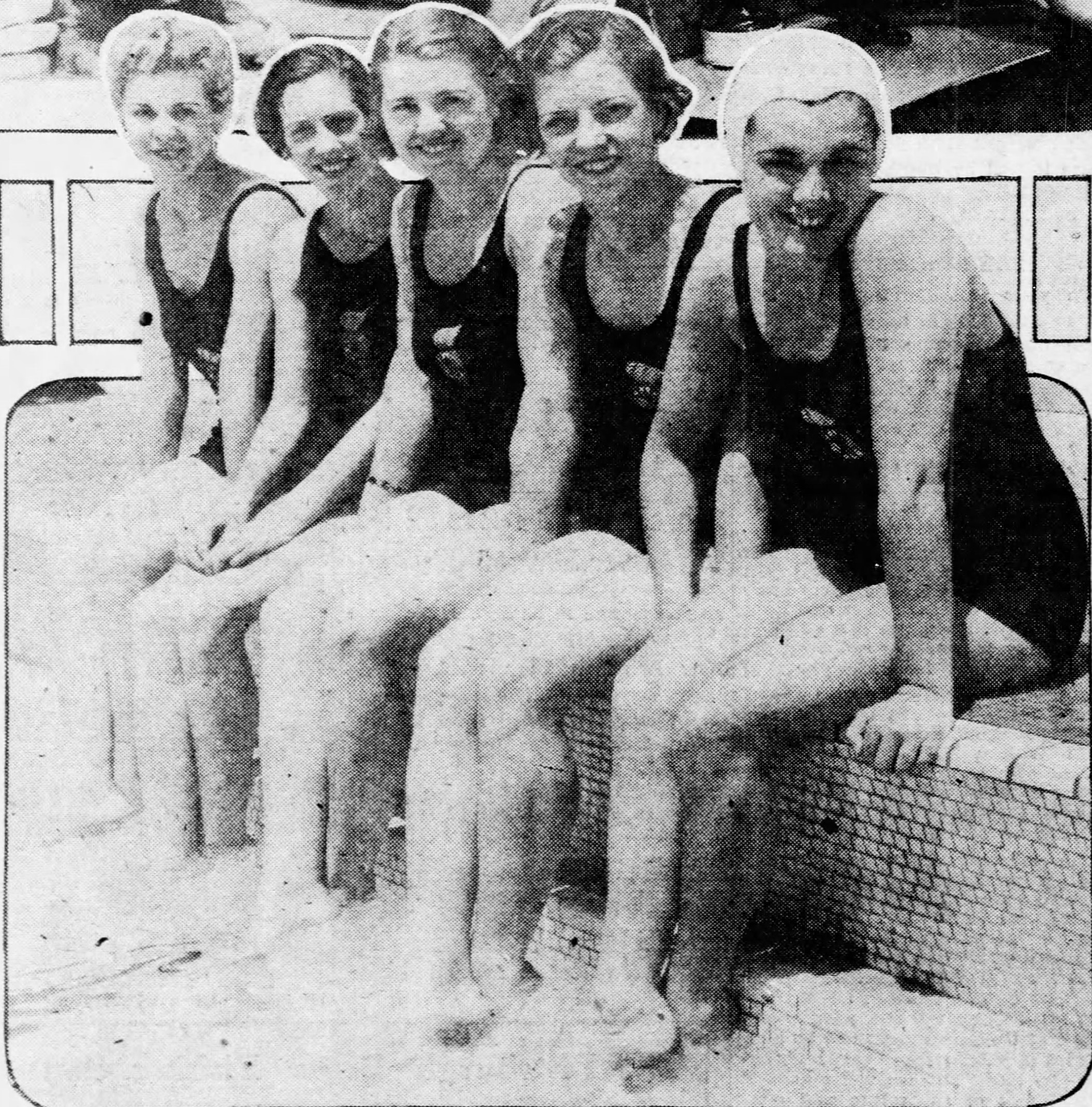
- Swimmers from Boston during try-outs for the 1932 Summer Olympics, (left to right) Joan McSheehy, Susan Robertson, Louisa Lindstorm, Catherine Ames and Eleanor Holm

Personal information
- Full name: Joan McSheehy
- National team: United States
- Born: July 22, 1913 Whitinsville, Massachusetts, U.S.
- Died: April 16, 1948 (aged 34) Baltimore, Maryland, U.S.

Sport
- Sport: Swimming
- Strokes: Backstroke
- Club: Women's Swimming Association

Joan McSheehy (July 22, 1913 – April 16, 1948), also known by her married name Joan Wilson Huffman, was an American competition swimmer who represented the United States at the 1932 Summer Olympics in Los Angeles, California. McSheehy finished fifth overall in the final of the women's 100-meter backstroke with a time of 1:23.2.

During her competitive career, she would set many national and sectional records.

== Biography ==
At age 13, she won her first accolade, when she came first in the 440-yeard junior title at Melrose. The following year, at the somerville YMCA, she won the New England women's senior backstroke championship.

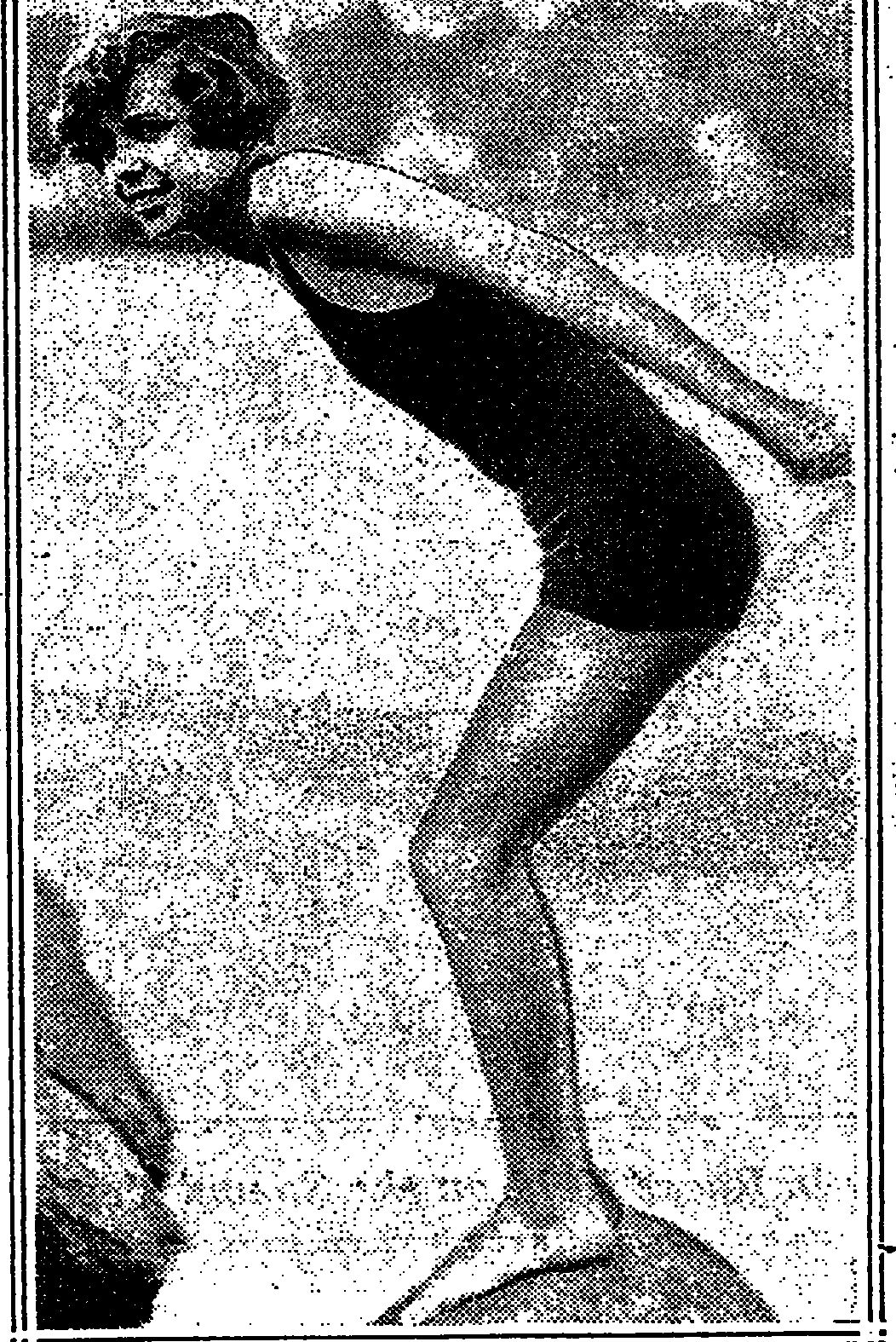
McSheehy in 1929

In 1929, at 15, she won a national backstroke championship in Chicago, and placed 3rd the 300-yeard medley title swim at the same event. She competed in the National A. A. U. outdoor women's swimming championships in Honolulu, with Albina Osipowich. The next year she beat, by 0.2 seconds, the world record for the 75-yeard breaststroke, completing the distance in 53.6 seconds, 34th annual swimming meet of the Brookline Swimming Club.

At the 1932 Summer Olympics in Los Angeles, California, McSheehy finished fifth in the final of the women's 100-meter backstroke. She was also on the winning medley-race team.

After the Olympics McSheehy appeared with one of the early professional swimming tours in Boston, that also featured Eleanor Holm. However, she gave up completive swimming in 1933, though she continued swimming for pleasure.

McSheehy married sailor Wilson Huffman, from Luray, Virginia, in November 1945. She died 16 April 1948, at Johns Hopkins Hospital, Baltimore, of meningitis.
