= Swimming at the 1932 Summer Olympics – Women's 100 metre backstroke =

Women's 100 metre backstroke at the Games of the X Olympiad
- Venue: LA84 Foundation/John C. Argue Swim Stadium
- Date: August 10, 1932 (heats); August 11, 1932 (final)
- Competitors: 12 from 7 nations
- Winning time: 1:19.4

Medalists
1st place, gold medalist(s)		Eleanor Holm	United States
2nd place, silver medalist(s)		Bonnie Mealing	Australia
3rd place, bronze medalist(s)		Valerie Davies	Great Britain

The women's 100 metre backstroke was a swimming event held as part of the swimming at the 1932 Summer Olympics programme. It was the third appearance of the event, which was established in 1924. The competition was held on Wednesday, August 10, 1932, and on Thursday, August 11, 1932.

Twelve swimmers from seven nations competed.

== Records ==
These were the standing world and Olympic records (in minutes) prior to the 1932 Summer Olympics.

World record	1:18.2	(United States) Eleanor Holm	Jones Beach (USA)	16 July 1932
Olympic record	1:21.6	(Netherlands) Marie Braun	Amsterdam (NED)	9 August 1928

In the first semi-final Eleanor Holm set a new Olympic record with 1:18.3 minutes.

== Results ==
=== Semifinals ===
Tuesday 9 August 1932: The fastest two in each semi-final and the fastest third-placed from across the semi-finals advanced to the final.

Semifinal 1

Place	Swimmer	Time	Qual.
1	Eleanor Holm (USA)	1:18.3	QQ OR
2	Bonnie Mealing (AUS)	1:21.6	QQ
3	Phyllis Harding (GBR)	1:22.6	qq
4	Puck Oversloot (NED)	1:23.5	
5	Misao Yokota (JPN)	1:25.1	

Semifinal 2

Place	Swimmer	Time	Qual.
1	Valerie Davies (GBR)	1:22.0	QQ
2	Joan McSheehy (USA)	1:22.5	QQ
3	Ruth Kerr (CAN)	1:28.2	
4	Maria Lenk (BRA)		

Semifinal 3

Place	Swimmer	Time	Qual.
1	Marie Braun (NED)	1:23.8	QQ
2	Joyce Cooper (GBR)	1:25.0	QQ
3	Marjorie Linton (CAN)	1:29.1	

=== Final ===
Thursday 11 August 1932: Marie Braun was not able to compete in the final. She had to stay in hospital due to blood poisoning after an infection caused by a mosquito bite.

Place	Swimmer	Time
1	Eleanor Holm (USA)	1:19.4
2	Bonnie Mealing (AUS)	1:21.3
3	Valerie Davies (GBR)	1:22.5
4	Phyllis Harding (GBR)	1:22.6
5	Joan McSheehy (USA)	1:23.2
6	Joyce Cooper (GBR)	1:23.4
