= Lilli Andersen =

Danish swimmer

Personal information
- Born: December 6, 1914 Roskilde, Denmark
- Died: January 24, 1988 (aged 73) Stockholm, Sweden

Sport
- Sport: Swimming
Medal record
Representing Denmark
European Championships
Bronze medal – third place	1934 Magdeburg	400 m freestyle

Else Lilly "Lilli" Andersen (later Svanberg, December 6, 1914 – January 24, 1988) was a Danish freestyle swimmer who competed in the 1932 Summer Olympics.

She was born in Sankt Jørgensbjerg, Roskilde and died in Oscar Parish, Stockholm. She married Tage Svanberg, a Swedish swimmer, and was the mother of John Torp Larsson and Hans Svanberg.

In 1932 she was eliminated in the semi-finals of the 400 metre freestyle event. She also participated in the 100 metre freestyle competition but was eliminated in the first round. She broke the world record in the 800 meter freestyle in 1933, and still holds the record of 7 hours 47 minutes for females for the Barsebäck–Bellevue course from 6 August 1937.
