= Florence Chambers =

American swimmer (1907–1979)

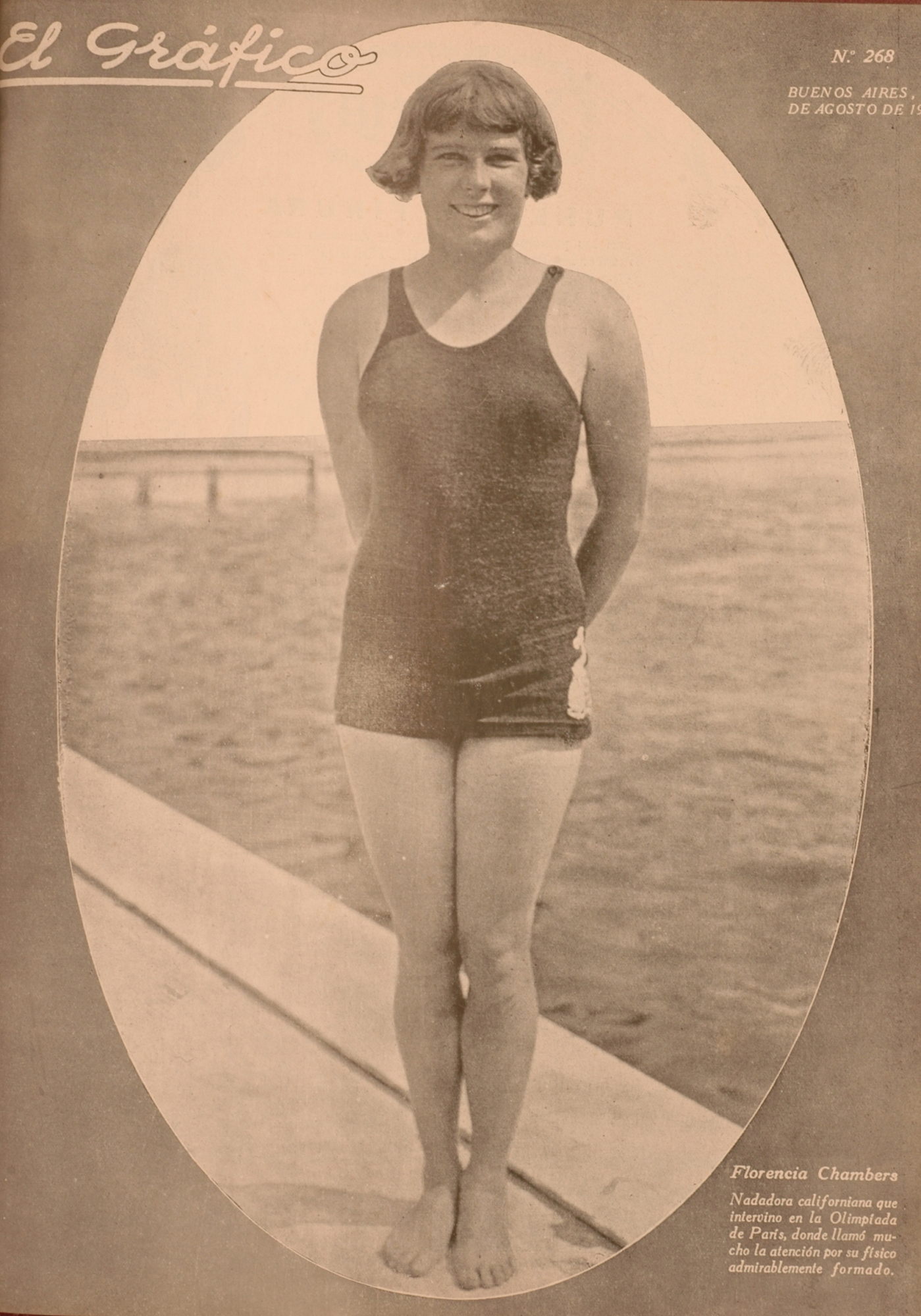
- Chambers in El Gráfico in 1924

Personal information
- Full name: Florence Chambers
- National team: United States
- Born: November 2, 1907 Boston, Massachusetts, U.S.
- Died: September 27, 1979 (aged 71) Fallbrook, California, U.S.
- Spouse: Richard Newkirk

Sport
- Sport: Swimming
- Strokes: Backstroke
- Club: Silver Gate Swim Club; San Diego Athletic Club; Florence Chambers SC

Florence Chambers (November 2, 1907 – September 27, 1979), known by her married name Florence Newkirk by May 1964, was an American competition swimmer who competed in the 100-meter backstroke for the United States at the 1924 Summer Olympics in Paris, finishing fourth in the finals. She was a successful swim coach and instructor who started the Florence Chambers Swim Club in the mid-1920s, and later became a leading business woman, community leader, and philanthropist in San Diego County.

== Early life and swimming career ==
Though Chambers was born in Boston, Massachusetts, to George and Emily Chambers, she lived in greater San Diego, at her parents' ranch in Poway, and at her Cloverdale Ranch of around 916 acres, outside Escondido, California, the majority of her life. Her father George owned the Pacific Beach Hotel in San Diego, having moved there from Brooklyn, New York in 1886. Chambers reportedly started swimming around 1917 for therapy from a spinal injury she received from a streetcar accident in Los Angeles around the age of nine. She won her first medal at age 11, and is believed to have won more than 300 medals and 136 trophies in her long career, which included both pool competition and open water swimming.

== Early swimming career highlights ==
=== Open Water ===
In October 1922, Chambers won San Francisco's Seal Rock Open Water Swim. By 1927, Chambers had won the 670-yard Silver Gate Channel Swim across San Diego Harbor three times.

=== Pool competition ===
At 22, in July 1923, Chambers swam with San Diego's Silver Gate Swim Club and held titles in the Southern Pacific AAU 100-yard backstroke, the junior 880-yard freestyle, and the 150-yard backstroke events. At the Annual Pacific Coast Swimming Championship in August, 1922, Chambers set a new Pacific Coast women's record of 1:22.2 in the 100-yard backstroke event. On October 14, 1923, Chambers set a new Pacific Coast record for the 75-yard backstroke of 59.8 seconds at the Ambassador Plunge in Los Angeles.

She lowered her own 100-yard Pacific Coast backstroke record in Los Angeles on October 29, 1925, with a time of 1:21, and also won the state championship in the 100-yard freestyle.

== 1924 Paris Olympics ==
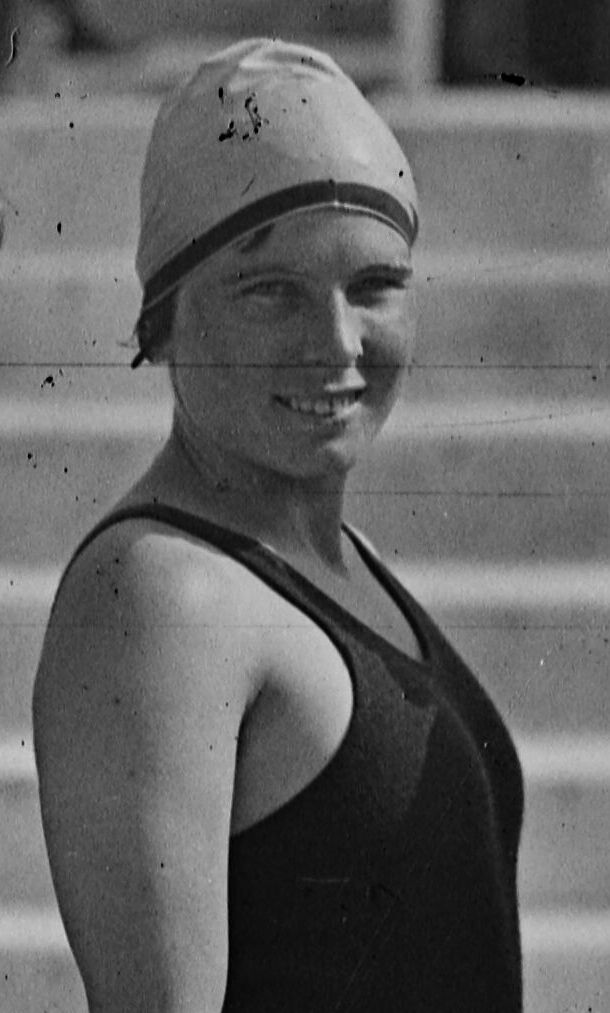
Florence Chambers in 1924

Chambers was selected to compete for the American team in the Olympics at the 1924 Women's Olympic Trial finals from June 7–8 at the Briarcliff Lodge Pool in Briar Cliff Manor, New York. The recently completed pool was one of the largest in the world at the time, and measured 600 by 300 feet. Future English Channel record holder Gertrude Ederle was a participant in the 100 and 400-meter freestyle. Selections for swimmers were also held in Indianapolis, Indiana.

At the 1924 Paris Olympics, Florence competed in the women's 100-meter backstroke, advanced to the event final, and finished fourth overall with a time of 1:30.8, two seconds behind the third-place American finisher, and diving competitor Aileen Riggin. At the time of her death and prior, several newspapers reported she had finished third and taken a bronze medal, though contemporary sources list her with a fourth-place finish.

== Swim instructor and coach ==
After her more competitive swimming career ended, by the mid-1920s she taught swimming, and had her own successful Florence Chambers Swim Club based in San Diego, from which a number of her women students competed in the October 1925 Pacific AAU Women's Championship Meet in Pasadena.

=== Florence Chambers Swim Club, circa 1926-1948 ===
Chambers at 16, circa 1924

Soon recognized as a regional leader in competitive swimming, the Florence Chambers Club took a silver trophy, scoring the second largest number of combined points at the Far Western Aquatic Championship in August 1928 in Long Beach. Her club swimmer Norene Forbes, a 1932 Olympian, was the women's high point scorer at the meet.

Continuing to field entries, Chambers' Club had numerous participants in the 1929 Southern Pacific Association AAU Aquatic Championships on June 2, 1929, in San Clemente. One of her swimmers, Cleo Smiley, held the Pacific Coast record and the record for the Southern Pacific Swimming and Diving Championships in the 100-yard backstroke at 1:29.8 in the early 1930s and placed second in the event in the February 1934 Southern Pacific AAU Swimming Championships in Los Angeles. Norene Forbes, another one of Florence's outstanding swimmers, won the Silver Gate Swim twice, as well as the two-mile Hermosa Beach Roughwater event.

Though Florence was not the only coach, her Women's team continued to compete at least through 1945, placing fifth in a meet in Pasadena in July 1945. By 1950, Chambers had taken a break in coaching her swim club and was beginning to focus on community work, though she would continue to instruct swimmers individually and in smaller groups at various times in her later life.

=== Florence Chadwick as student ===
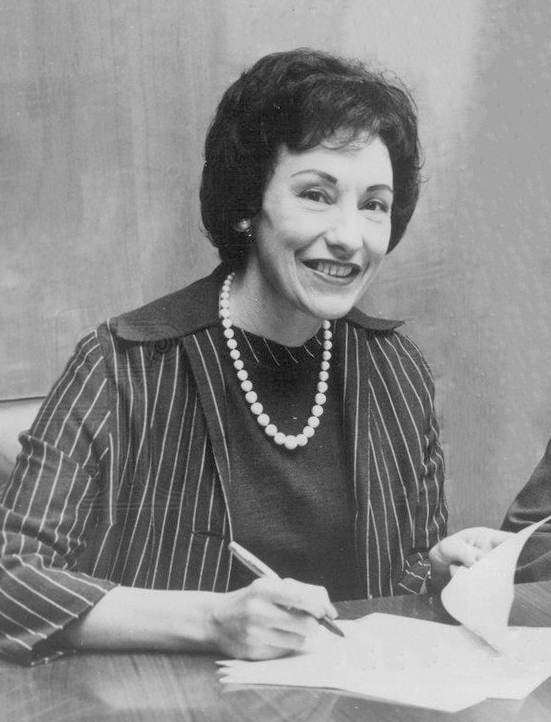
Circa 1963, Pupil, Florence Chadwick

While working as an instructor, she had International Swimming Hall of Fame English Channel swimmer Florence Chadwick as one of her pupils. Chadwick first began instruction with the Florence Chambers Swim Club at the age of 9, around 1927, and continued to swim with the Chambers Club through around 1932, when she switched to the Los Angeles Athletic Club. Likely benefitting from Chamber's knowledge of and experience with backstroke and freestyle competition, at the age of 14 Chadwick was the Southern Pacific AAU Junior 100-yard backstroke and 500-meter freestyle champion. Chadwick won the Los Angeles Hermosa Beach Roughwater Swim in June 1933, a competition in which her coach Florence Chambers placed fifth. In her most memorable achievement as a distance swimmer, Chadwick crossed the Channel in 1950 with a time of 13 hours, 23 minutes, breaking Gertrude Ederle's twenty-year record, and was known as the first women to cross the Channel in both directions in 1951. Chadwick completed the Channel swim four times.

=== Post-Olympic swimming ===
While working as a coach and instructor, Chambers still trained and competed in swimming events for fitness. On August 2, 1926, she won the half mile women's race in AAU competition in Long Beach, California, as part of the Long Beach Water Festival.

In August 1927, she won the 100-yard backstroke, the 100-yard medley, and placed second in the 220-yard freestyle event at the All-Women's Aquatic Meet in Pasadena, California, with her Florence Chambers Swim Club taking third place overall with the most combined points.

She represented her own club in Women's competition at the July 3, 1930 National AAU Swimming Championships in Long Beach, California.

She also competed in the annual Silver Gate Channel Swim across the San Diego Harbor entrance on June 22, 1930. Representing her own Florence Chambers Swim Club, she completed the 670-yard swim in 12 minutes, 15 seconds, taking a fourth place in the women's competition, and leading her own swim club to a team victory with two women from her club among the top ten to finish the course. In July 1933, she placed fifth in Los Angeles' 2-mile Hermosa Beach Roughwater Swim for Women. Chambers was also one of the earliest swimmers to compete the La Jolla Roughwater course from Scripps Biological Pier to La Jolla Cove, North of San Diego.

== Community leader and philanthropist ==
Circa 1972, Florence (Chambers) Newkirk

Chambers served for many years with the San Diego County Board of Supervisors as a Farm Bureau Representative, and was an honorary member for life of the San Diego Historical Society. A supporter of the San Diego Zoological Society, she patronized its Wild Animal Park which was only a mile from her Cloverdale Ranch, around five miles Southeast of Escondido. She had a major interest in San Diego County properties, and also owned land inherited from her father in Poway, California, and along Witch Creek, East of the Sutherland Dam in Ramona, California, in San Diego County. She purchased Cloverdale Ranch officially around 1950, and also had income from rental property in San Diego, Mission Beach, and Los Angeles.

She was a leading philanthropist, contributing both her time and finances, and was particularly supportive of the Boy Scouts of America from whom she received a special award. A supporter and patron who took an interest in the way Brigham Young University developed character in its students, she received a Presidential Award from the college "in appreciation of extraordinary service". She also served on the Escondido Farm Bureau Center, and the San Diego Nutrition Society. In 1960–61, she was appointed by the San Diego County Board as a citizen advisor to the public welfare department.

=== San Diego honors ===
As both a recognized athlete and a San Diego County Agricultural and community leader, in 1970 Chambers was inducted by the San Diego Hall of Champions into the Breitbard Hall of Fame, honoring San Diego's finest athletes both on and off the playing surface. In 1959, she was named the Woman of Achievement by the President's Council of Women's Service Clubs of San Diego. In 1971 was named the Lady of Agriculture of San Diego County.

=== Death ===
Shortly before her death, she bequeathed her ranch, then with an estimated value of around 5 million dollars to Brigham Young University and gave another large donation to the San Diego Historical Society. She died September 27, 1979, at Fallbrook Hospital in Fallbrook California, in Northern San Diego County and was survived by her husband Richard, a retired teacher, whom she married around May 1964.
