= Hatsuho Matsuzawa =

Japanese swimmer (1914–2011)

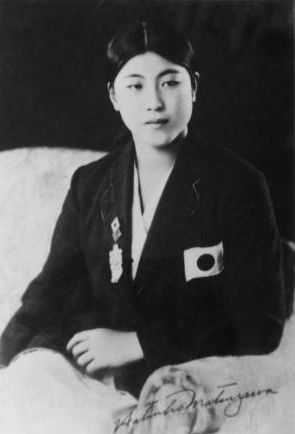

Personal information
- Born: 8 October 1914 Maizuru, Kyoto, Japan
- Died: 1 January 2011 (aged 96) Nishinomiya, Hyogo, Japan
- Education: Japan Women's College of Physical Education

Sport
- Sport: Swimming

Hatsuho Matsuzawa (松澤 初穂, Matsuzawa Hatsuho; 8 October 1914 – 1 January 2011) was a Japanese swimmer. She competed in the 100 m freestyle event at the 1932 Olympics, but was eliminated in the preliminaries.

On 29 August 1933 Matsuzawa set a national record in the 50 m freestyle at 31.06 seconds that stood until 21 August 1954. In 1934 she became a high school teacher, and in 1936 a national swimming coach at the Berlin Olympics. She married in 1937 and later had five children, including Sadahiko Sugaya (菅谷定彦), who became president and CEO of TV Tokyo. She returned to swimming in 1984, and between 1986 and 2000 competed at national and world masters championships.
