= Swimming at the 1932 Summer Olympics – Women's 400 metre freestyle =

Women's 100 metre freestyle at the Games of the X Olympiad
- Venue: LA84 Foundation/John C. Argue Swim Stadium
- Date: August 11, 1932 (heats); August 12, 1932 (semifinals); August 13, 1932 (final)
- Competitors: 14 from 9 nations
- Winning time: 5:28.5 WR

Medalists
1st place, gold medalist(s)		Helene Madison	United States
2nd place, silver medalist(s)		Lenore Kight	United States
3rd place, bronze medalist(s)		Jenny Maakal	South Africa

The women's 400 metre freestyle was a swimming event held as part of the swimming at the 1932 Summer Olympics programme. It was the third appearance of the event, which was established in 1924 after 1920 a 300-metre event was held. The competition was held on Thursday 11 August 1932 and on Saturday 13 August 1932.

Fourteen swimmers from nine nations competed.

== Records ==
These were the standing world and Olympic records (in minutes) prior to the 1932 Summer Olympics.

World record	5:31.0	(United States) Helene Madison	Seattle (USA)	3 February 1931
Olympic record	5:42.8	(United States) Martha Norelius	Amsterdam (NED)	6 August 1928

In the third heat Lenore Kight set a new Olympic record with 5:40.9 minutes. Helene Madison set a new world record in the final with 5:28.5 minutes.

== Results ==
=== Heats ===
Thursday 11 August 1932: The fastest two in each heat and the fastest third-placed from across the heats advanced to the final.

Heat 1

Place	Swimmer	Time	Qual.
1	Joyce Cooper (GBR)	5:56.7	QQ
2	Norene Forbes (USA)	5:57.8	QQ
3	Yvonne Godard (FRA)	5:57.8	qq
4	Irene Pirie (CAN)	6:22.2	

Heat 2

Place	Swimmer	Time	Qual.
1	Helene Madison (USA)	5:44.5	QQ
2	Marie Braun (NED)	5:50.5	QQ
3	Betty Edwards (CAN)	6:27.2	

Heat 3

Place	Swimmer	Time	Qual.
1	Lenore Kight (USA)	5:40.9	QQ OR
2	Puck Oversloot (NED)	5:50.3	QQ
3	Frances Bult (AUS)	6:03.0	

Heat 4

Place	Swimmer	Time	Qual.
1	Jenny Maakal (RSA)	5:53.9	QQ
2	Lilli Andersen (DEN)	6:05.1	QQ
3	Hatsuko Morioka (JPN)	6:07.4	
4	Ruth Kerr (CAN)	6:25.7	

=== Semifinals ===
Friday 12 August 1932: The fastest three in each semi-final advanced to the final. Marie Braun was not able to compete in the semi-finals. She had to stay in hospital due to blood poisoning after an infection officially caused by a mosquito bite.

Semifinal 1

Place	Swimmer	Time	Qual.
1	Helene Madison (USA)	5:48.7	QQ
2	Jenny Maakal (RSA)	6:00.6	QQ
3	Norene Forbes (USA)	6:22.1	QQ
–	Puck Oversloot (NED)	DNS	

Semifinal 2

Place	Swimmer	Time	Qual.
1	Lenore Kight (USA)	5:50.8	QQ
2	Yvonne Godard (FRA)	6:00.1	QQ
3	Joyce Cooper (GBR)	6:00.4	QQ
4	Lilli Andersen (DEN)	6:05.5	
–	Marie Braun (NED)	DNS	

=== Final ===
Saturday 13 August 1932:

Place	Swimmer	Time
1	Helene Madison (USA)	5:28.5 WR
2	Lenore Kight (USA)	5:28.6
3	Jenny Maakal (RSA)	5:47.3
4	Joyce Cooper (GBR)	5:49.7
5	Yvonne Godard (FRA)	5:54.4
6	Norene Forbes (USA)	6:06.0
