= Norene Forbes =

American swimmer (1914–2004)

Norene E. Forbes
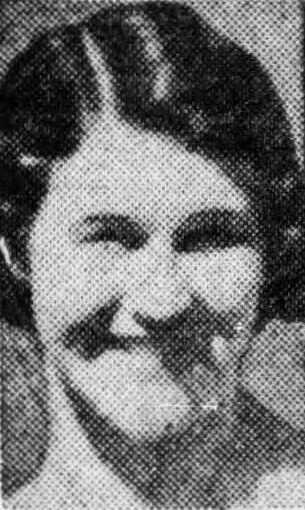
- Forbes in 1932

Personal information
- Full name: Norene Elizabeth Forbes -Lancucki
- National team: United States
- Born: July 24, 1914 Los Angeles, California, U.S.
- Died: June 15, 2004 (aged 89) Highland Park, Michigan, U.S.
- Spouse: Thadeus Joseph Lancucki

Sport
- Sport: Swimming
- Event: 400-meter freestyle (Olympics)
- Strokes: Freestyle
- Club: Florence Chambers Swim Club
- Coach: Florence Chambers (Chambers S.C.); Robert J. H. Kiphuth (Olympics)

Norene Elizabeth Forbes (July 24, 1914 – June 15, 2004), later known by her married name Norene Lancucki, was an American competition swimmer who competed in the 1932 Los Angeles Olympics.

Forbes was born July 24, 1914 in Los Angeles, California one of around six siblings to Henry William Forbes Sr. and Alena Belle Ross Forbes. In 1928, by the age of 13, she swam for the Florence Chambers swimming club of San Diego where she was coached by Florence Chambers. Florence Chambers, a 1924 Paris Olympian in backstroke, started her swim club in the mid-1920's, and it remained a regional power through the mid-1940's. Like Chambers, Forbes would also compete as a multi-stroke competitor, but would become known primarily for her speed in freestyle events.

== Silver Gate Channel swim ==
Around June, 1928, at age 13 she won the "Silver Gate Channel Swim", sponsored by the San Diego Sun, an open water distance of roughly 650 yards, with a time of 8m 30s. She retained the title the following year, covering the distance in the fastest time ever made to date in either the men's or women's races.

== 1928 Olympic trials ==
Forbes attended the July 1-2, 1928 Olympic trials at Playland pool in Rockaway, New Jersey travelling from San Diego with fellow Florence Chambers club swimmer Genevieve Scully, a breaststroke specialist. Forbes was scheduled to compete in the 400-meter freestyle event, but did not qualify for the 1928 Paris Olympic team. Martha Norelius and Ethel McGary of the Women's Swimming Association placed first and second respectively with Susan Laird placing third in the trial finals for the 400-meter swim.

At 14, representing the Florence Chambers Swim Club at the late July Pacific Southwest Swim Meet on July 28-29, 1928, in Long Beach California, Forbes was the high scoring swimmer, setting a record in the 100-yard freestyle with a time of 1:13.4, setting another record in the 330-yard medley, demonstrating her competence in multiple strokes, and swimming on a winning 440-yard relay swim.

In August 1928, as the high scorer, she won both the 100-yard freestyle with a time of 1:19.8 and the 440-yard freestyle with a time of 8:14.6 at the Far Western AAU Swim Meet, leading the Chambers Club to the team championship in a close win over the San Clemente team. She had earlier won the 400-meter freestyle in a time of 6:10.2, helping to qualify her for the 1928 trials in the event.

== 1932 Olympics ==
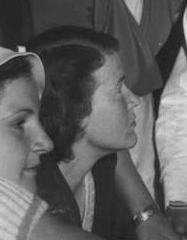
Forbes in profile, 1932

Forbes finished in third place at the 1936 Olympic trials in the 400 meter freestyle in Jones Beach, New York, on July 18, qualifying her for the event. Helene Madison won the trial final with a time of 5:32.4, an Olympic record, Lenore Kight of Homestead, Pennsylvania finished second with a time of 5:37, and Forbes finished third with a time of 5:56.

Having qualified in the trials in July, at 18, Forbes represented the United States women's swim team at the mid-August 1932 Summer Olympics in Los Angeles where Yale Coach Robert J. H. Kiphuth served as coach for both the men and women, though Charlotte Epstein served as the manager for the women's swim team. Forbes finished sixth overall in the 400-meter freestyle, recording a time of 6:06.0 in the event final. American Helene Madison placed first with a time of 5:28.5, American Lenore Knight placed second for the silver with a time of 5:28.6 and Jenny Makal of South Africa placed third for the bronze with a time of 5:47.3.

=== Later life ===
In later life, Forbes married Thadeus Lancucki. Their son David was a Master's Swimmer and coach who coached the West Point Country Club Swim team in Central Pennsylvania in 1992.

She died at the age of 89 on June 15, 2004 in Highland Park, Michigan, where she had resided with her husband Thadeus, and was buried at the Lake Ann Cemetery in Lake Ann, Michigan as was her husband in 2013.
