= Florence Chadwick =

American swimmer (1918–1995)

Florence May Chadwick
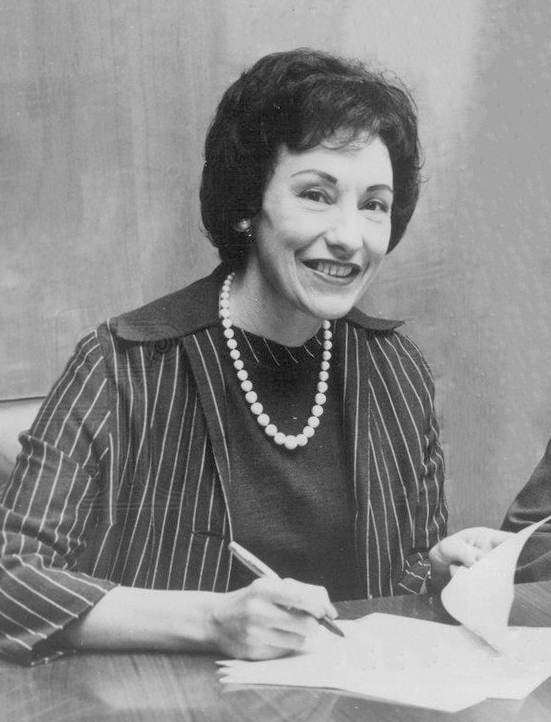
- Chadwick in 1963

Personal information
- Born: November 9, 1918 San Diego, California, U.S.
- Died: March 15, 1995 (aged 76) San Diego, California, U.S.
- Occupations: Product spokesperson, credit counselor, stockbroker

Sport
- Sport: Long-distance swimming
- Strokes: Distance freestyle, backstroke
- Club: Florence Chambers Swim Club; Los Angeles Athletic Club
- Coach: Florence Chambers

Florence May Chadwick (November 9, 1918 – March 15, 1995) was an American swimmer known for long-distance open water swimming. She was the first woman to swim across the English Channel in both directions, setting a time record each time. She was also the first woman to swim the Catalina Channel, the Straits of Gibraltar, the Bosporus (one way), and the Dardanelles (round trip).

== Biography ==
Florence May Chadwick was born in San Diego on November 9, 1918. Her parents were Richard Chadwick, a police officer, and Mary Lacko, a homemaker who later operated a San Diego restaurant. Chadwick grew up in the Point Loma neighborhood of San Diego and graduated from Point Loma Junior-Senior High School in 1936. She attended San Diego State College and studied at several law schools and a business college. She was married and divorced twice, and had no children.

=== Early swimming and instruction ===
Chadwick entered swimming competitions from a young age, scoring her first win at the age of ten, but she realized she preferred ocean events rather than pool swims. Chadwick first began instruction and competition with 1924 Olympian Florence Chambers, and the Florence Chambers Swim Club in San Diego at the age of 9, around 1927, and continued to swim with the Chambers Club through around 1932, when she switched to the Los Angeles Athletic Club.

At the age of 10, she became the youngest person to swim across the mouth of San Diego Bay. Starting at age eleven, she competed in rough water swims, winning an annual 2.5-mile race in the ocean off La Jolla, North of San Diego, 10 times in 18 years.

==== Early pool and open water wins ====
Highly accomplished as a young competitive swimmer, Chadwick won the 100-yard backstroke event at the Junior AAU National Championship at age 14 in May 1933 with a time of 1:17, and the following August won the junior 500-meter freestyle event at the 1933 Southern Pacific National AAU Swimming and Diving Championships in Los Angeles. Chadwick's early instructor Florence Chambers won the 500-meter freestyle in the Women's adult division at the 1933 AAU Nationals, the same event Chadwick won as a junior competitor.

When Chadwick won the two-mile Los Angeles Hermosa Beach Roughwater Swim with a time of 54:23 while swimming for the San Diego Athletic Club on July 2, 1933, her early instructor Florence Chambers, placed fifth. On July 4, 1933, Chadwick handily won the 600-yard Venice Roughwater Swim for Women with a time of 15 minutes flat. Chadwick swam in Southern California ocean races as an amateur for several decades, but had her heart set to swim across the English Channel.

=== First English Channel swims ===
In 1950 Chadwick attempted to enter a 1950 Channel-swimming contest sponsored by the Daily Mail but was refused for lack of a significant reputation. Determined to complete the swim at her own expense, she failed in July after 14 hours in the water.

On August 8, 1950, at the age of 32, she crossed the English Channel from France to England in 13 hours and 23 minutes, breaking the then-current world record held by American swimmer Gertrude Ederle. One year later, Chadwick crossed the channel again, from England to France this time, in 16 hours and 22 minutes, thus making her the first woman to swim across the channel in both directions, and setting a record for the England-France journey. She ultimately swam the Channel four times.

=== Catalina Island ===
In 1952, Florence attempted to swim the 26 miles between Catalina Island and the California coastline. As she began, she was flanked by small boats that watched for sharks and were prepared to help her if she got hurt or grew tired. After about 15 hours a thick fog set in. Florence began to doubt her ability, and she told her mother, who was in one of the boats, that she did not think she could make it. She swam for another hour before asking to be pulled out, unable to see the coastline due to the fog. As she sat in the boat, she found out she had stopped swimming just one mile away from her destination. Two months later, she tried again. The same thick fog set in, but she succeeded in reaching Catalina. She said that she kept a mental image of the shoreline in her mind while she swam. She later swam the Catalina channel on two additional occasions.

=== Distance swim highlights ===
During the summer of 1953, she successfully swam the Channel again (setting a new women's record), as well as the Strait of Gibraltar (setting an all-time record of 5:06), the Bosporus, and the Dardanelles. In 1955 she swam the Channel again, breaking her own record time. In August 1957 she swam the Bristol Channel from Weston-super-Mare to Penarth Head, 11 miles in a record-breaking 6 hours 7 mins.

Not all of her long-distance swim attempts were successful. In 1954, she tried to become the first person to swim across Lake Ontario but gave up after becoming ill a few hours into her swim. Other unsuccessful attempts included the Strait of Juan de Fuca and two tries at the Irish Sea (her last major swim attempt in 1960).

=== Other employment ===
She gave product endorsements and served for many years as the spokesperson for Catalina Swimwear. She taught swimming at a number of venues and worked with Esther Williams to design movie swimming sequences. She also worked as a credit counselor and stockbroker, and was an executive at San Diego's First Wall Street Corporation.

She died at San Diego's Mercy Hospital of leukemia on March 15, 1995. After cremation, her ashes were scattered into the ocean off San Diego's Point Loma, not too distant from where she grew up, went to High School, and completed many of her earliest open water swims in La Jolla and San Diego Harbor.

== Recognition and honors ==
In December 1951, Chadwick appeared as herself in Faye Emerson's Wonderful Town musical series on CBS television. The program highlighted Chadwick's hometown of San Diego.

On October 30, 1955, she appeared as a guest on "What's My Line?".

In 1962, Chadwick was inducted by the San Diego Hall of Champions into its Breitbard Hall of Fame.

In 1970, as a career highlight, she was inducted into the International Swimming Hall of Fame.

== See also ==
- List of members of the International Swimming Hall of Fame
