= Gavvy Cravath =

American baseball player and manager (1881–1963)

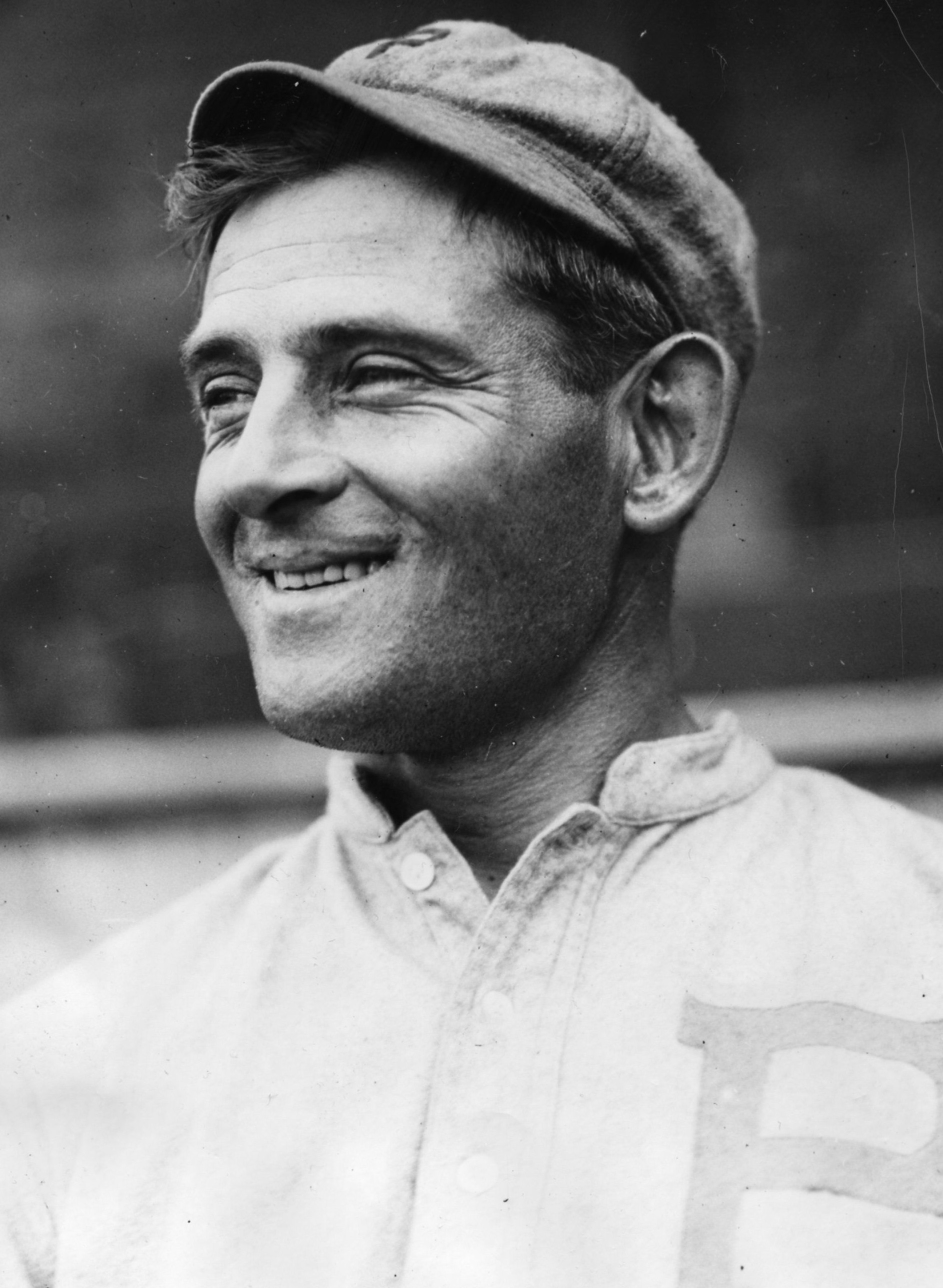
- Right fielder / Manager
- Born: March 23, 1881; Poway, California, U.S.
- Died: May 23, 1963 (aged 82); Laguna Beach, California, U.S.
- Batted: Right Threw: Right

MLB debut
- April 18, 1908, for the Boston Red Sox

Last MLB appearance
- October 2, 1920, for the Philadelphia Phillies

MLB statistics
- Batting average: .287
- Home runs: 119
- Runs batted in: 719
- Managerial record: 91–137
- Winning %: .399
- Stats at Baseball Reference

Teams
- As player: Boston Red Sox (1908); Chicago White Sox (1909); Washington Senators (1909); Philadelphia Phillies (1912–1920); As manager: Philadelphia Phillies (1919–1920)

Career highlights and awards
- 6× NL home run leader (1913–1915, 1917–1919); 2× NL RBI leader (1913, 1915); Philadelphia Phillies Wall of Fame

Clifford Carlton "Gavvy" Cravath (March 23, 1881 – May 23, 1963), also nicknamed "Cactus", was an American right fielder and right-handed batter in Major League Baseball who played primarily for the Philadelphia Phillies. One of the sport's most prolific power hitters of the dead-ball era, in the eight years from 1913 to 1920 he led the National League in home runs six times, in runs batted in, total bases and slugging percentage twice each, and in hits, runs and walks once each. Cravath is almost certainly the first player to hit 200 home runs in affiliated baseball—119 in the majors, 107 in the minors and seven in the 1903 "independent" Pacific Coast League. He led the NL in several offensive categories in 1915 as the Phillies won the first pennant in the team's 33-year history, and he held the team's career home run record from 1917 to 1924. He is one of eight players to lead the majors in home runs for a season six times in a career. He is the only player to hit more than 100 home runs in the Deadball Era (1901–1919). However, he played his home games at Baker Bowl, a park that was notoriously favorable to batting statistics. Cravath hit 93 career homers at Baker Bowl while he had 26 homers in all his games away from home. However, Cravath admirers point out that none of his contemporaries were able to exploit Baker Bowl in similar fashion: From 1912 through 1919 he hit a fifth of the Baker Bowl homers with less than a twentieth of the plate appearances and hit 60% as many homers as all visiting teams put together. Moreover, he was an exceptionally slow base runner; so much so, in fact, that it was actually Cravath about whom sportswriter Bugs Baer famously wrote, "His head was sure full of larceny, but his feet were honest," a distinction which, along with Cravath's extreme lack of foot speed, has long been mistakenly ascribed to Ping Bodie. But again, Cravath's defenders point out that he was 31 by the time he settled in the major leagues and he demonstrated speed when he was younger, stealing 183 bases in five seasons in the Pacific Coast League. He was 38 when his attempt to steal a base inspired Baer's remark.

== California ==
Born in Escondido, California, Cravath was the first baseball player from the San Diego area to play in the major leagues. He began his career during a time of independent minor leagues, when not all good players moved quickly to the majors. He entered professional baseball in 1903 with the Los Angeles Angels of the Pacific Coast League; during 5 seasons with the team, he helped them win two pennants. He batted .274, .270, .259, .270, and .303, with 7, 13, 9, 6, and 10 home runs, and with 51, 50, 32, 39, and 45 doubles. He led the league in doubles twice (1906 and 1907) and also finished third twice. Although he never led the PCL in home runs, he was second in the league three times, third once, and fourth once during his 5 seasons.

While playing in California, Cravath reportedly picked up his nickname of "Gavvy" by hitting a ball that killed a seagull ("gaviota" in Spanish) in flight. The reporters spelled the nickname "Gavvy" to emphasize that it rhymes with "savvy", but Cravath himself spelled it "Gavy."

== Boston, Chicago, Washington, and Minneapolis ==
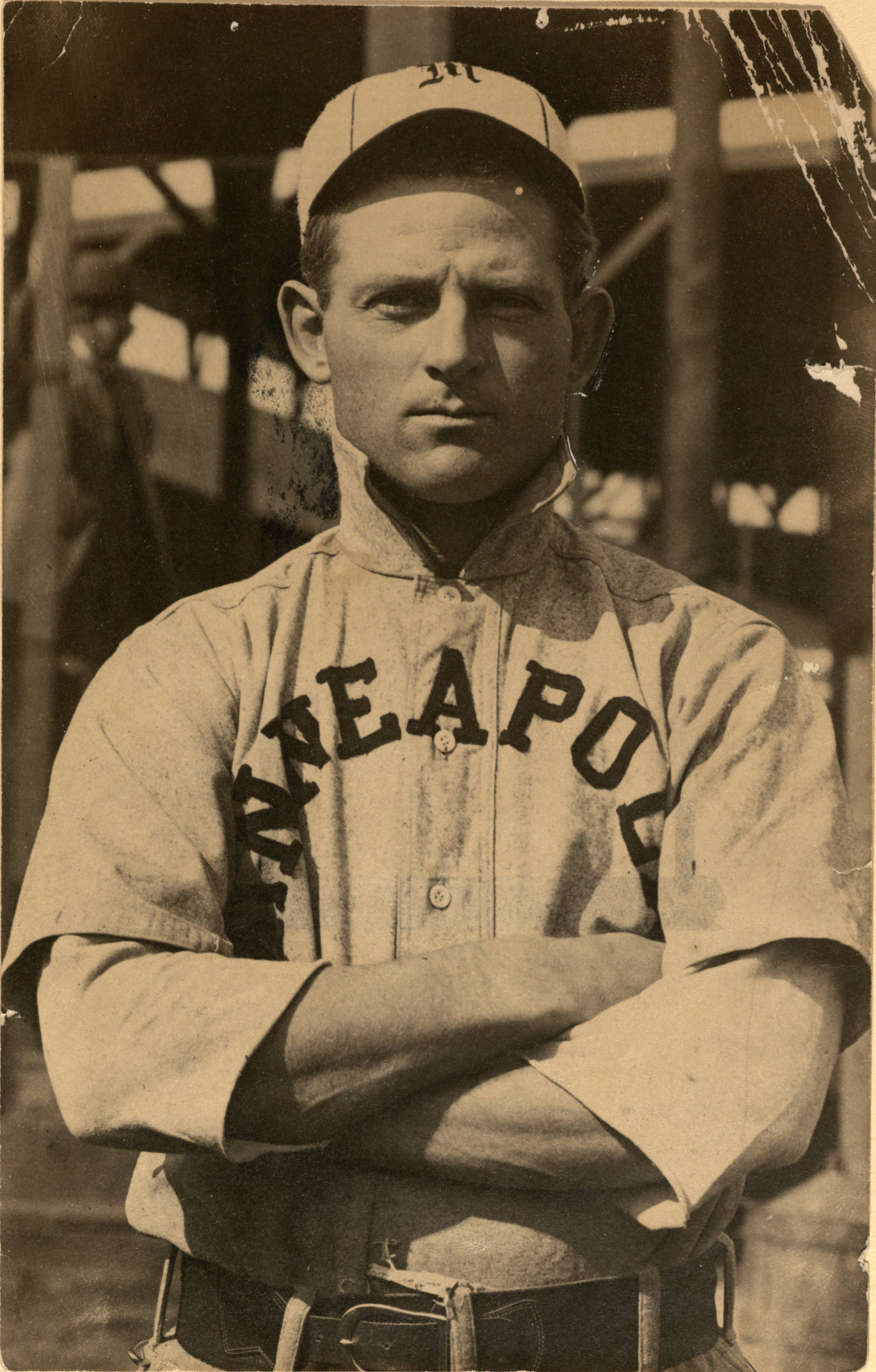
Cravath in Minneapolis Millers uniform 1910

At the end of 1907, Cravath's contract was sold to the Boston Red Sox, where he would be a 27-year-old rookie in 1908. His lack of speed was compared unfavorably to Tris Speaker and other swift outfielders of the time; Cravath once said, "They call me wooden shoes and piano legs and a few other pet names. I do not claim to be the fastest man in the world, but I can get around the bases with a fair wind and all sails set. And so long as I am busting the old apple on the seam, I am not worrying a great deal about my legs." He was hitting .256 with 11 triples in 277 at bats when his contract was sold to the Chicago White Sox in August 1908. After a slow start in Chicago in 1909, he was traded to the Washington Senators, who moved him to the Minneapolis Millers of the American Association after only four games.

In Minneapolis, Cravath learned to hit to the opposite field to take advantage of the short (279 ft) right-field line at Nicollet Park. That ability would also serve him well with the Phillies, who had a similar short right-field porch only 272 feet from home plate at the Baker Bowl. The 1910–11 Millers were one of the great minor league teams of all time, and Cravath was their biggest star. In 1910 he led the league in batting average (.326), hits (200), home runs (14), doubles (41), and triples (13). In 1911 he again led the league in the same categories except for triples, with an average of .363, 221 hits, 53 doubles, 13 triples, and 29 home runs.

== Philadelphia ==
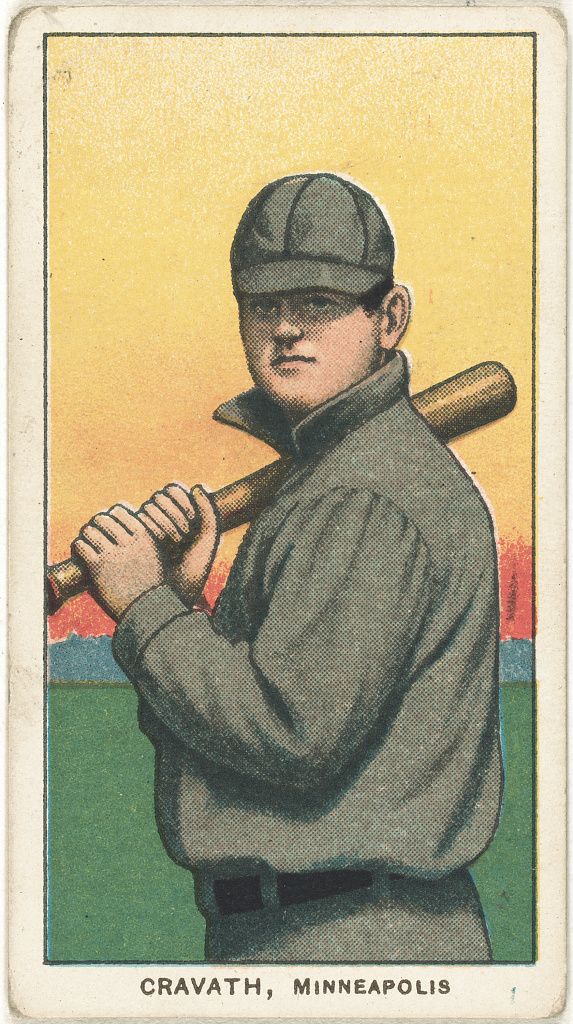
T206 baseball card of Gavvy Cravath

The rules of the time did not make it easy for Cravath to move back to the majors. Reportedly, it took a clerical error—the Millers inadvertently left out the word "not" in a telegram—to get Cravath back to the major leagues. In his second chance with the Phillies at age 31 in 1912, he proved he was there to stay by hitting .284 with 11 home runs and 70 RBI. He was also a more than adequate outfielder, sharing the league lead with 26 assists.

In 1913 he enjoyed an even better season, leading the NL in hits (179), home runs (19), RBI (128), total bases (298), and slugging (.568); he also placed second in batting with a career-high mark of .341. He placed second in the voting for the Chalmers (MVP) Award behind Jake Daubert, though some historians think Cravath should have won. Other historians disagree citing the fact that his numbers were largely a product of his tiny home park. He repeated as home run champion in 1914, hitting all of his 19 homers in home games, while again sharing the league lead in assists and finishing second in RBI and slugging.

1915 saw his best season as he hit 24 home runs (only 5 home runs away from tiny Baker Bowl), leading the Phillies to their first pennant; he had a 3-run home run in the pennant-clinching game on September 29. He also led the league in runs (89), RBI (115, leading the NL by 28), total bases (266), walks (86), on-base percentage (.393), and slugging (.510, leading the NL by 53 points), and led the NL in assists for the third time. His 24 home runs were the most in the major leagues since Buck Freeman hit 25 for the 1899 Washington Senators; he also broke Sam Thompson's Phillies franchise record of 20, set in 1889. He later broke Thompson's career franchise record; Cravath's single-season club mark was surpassed by Cy Williams in 1922, and his career record was broken by Williams in 1924. In the low-scoring 1915 World Series against the Red Sox he hit only .125 (2-16), though he drove in the winning run on a ground out in Game 1, the only Phillies victory. He scored Philadelphia's only runs in Games 2 and 4 (both 2–1 losses), and Boston won in five games, outscoring the Phillies 12–10. In Game 5, after the first three Phillie batters reached base, manager Pat Moran gave Cravath the bunt sign on a 3–2 count for unknown reasons; the slugger rolled the next pitch to the pitcher, resulting in a double play.

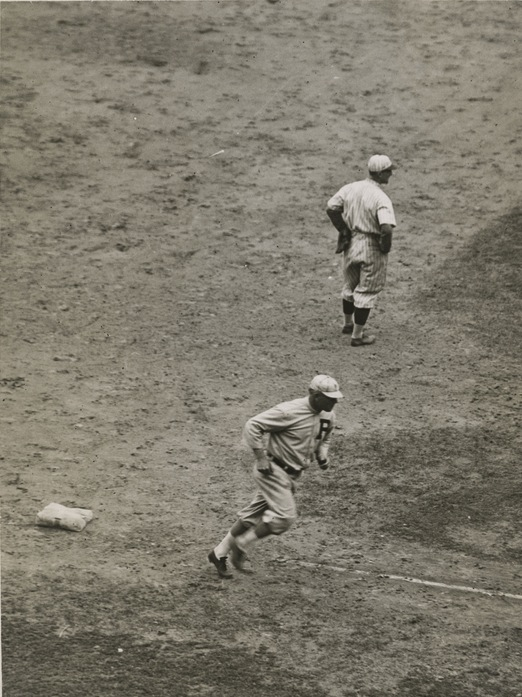
Cravath rounding third after hitting a home run, 1919–1920

Regarded as one of the sport's pioneer sluggers of the 20th century, Cravath went on to become the first player to win more than five home run titles. However, his home run total was overwhelmingly a product of the hitter-friendly dimensions of his home park with the Phillies, the Baker Bowl; Cravath hit 92 of his 119 career homers in the Baker Bowl. Although his level of play declined gradually after 1915, he again won the home run title in 1917 and 1918. In 1919, at age 38, he had his last outstanding season, winning his sixth home run title with 12 homers (only 2 homers on the road) in just 214 at-bats while hitting .341 (just .291 on the road). In last place midway through the season, the Phillies fired manager Jack Coombs, and Cravath took his place. After he was invited to return as player-manager in 1920, the Phillies improved to 62–91, but ended up in last place again. Cravath was criticized for his easygoing style and was released, ending his major league career; he became player-manager for the Salt Lake City Bees of the Pacific Coast League in 1921. He played his final professional games in 1922 with the Minneapolis Millers.

Cravath had a career .287 batting average with 119 home runs, the fourth most in history at the time of his retirement, and 719 RBI in 1220 games. Mel Ott eventually tied his NL record of six home run titles; Ralph Kiner broke the record in 1952 with seven; and Mike Schmidt now holds the record of eight titles, set with the Phillies in 1986. Cravath's 20th-century record of 119 homers was broken by Babe Ruth in 1921.

== Post-baseball ==
Cravath returned to California, where he went into real estate and was elected magistrate judge (Justice of the Peace) in September 1927 in Laguna Beach, California; he died there at age 82. His nephew Jeff Cravath was head football coach at the University of Southern California from 1942 to 1950.

In a June 27, 2004 interview with the Washington Post, 7-time Jeopardy! game show champion Tom Walsh, who set the record for wins on the program in January 2004 before Ken Jennings came along later that year and won 74 games in a row, said, "I feel like 'Cactus Gavvy' Cravath. Do you know who that is? Right. Nobody does. He's the guy who had the home run record before Babe Ruth came along."

In 1985, Cravath was also inducted by the San Diego Hall of Champions into the Breitbard Hall of Fame honoring San Diego's finest athletes both on and off the playing surface.

== See also ==
- List of Major League Baseball home run records
- List of Major League Baseball doubles records
- List of Major League Baseball annual runs batted in leaders
- List of Major League Baseball annual home run leaders
- List of Major League Baseball annual runs scored leaders
- List of Major League Baseball player-managers
- Major League Baseball titles leaders

== Literature ==
- William Swank. Gavy Cravath. In Society for American Baseball Research, Deadball Era Committee; Simon, Tom (Ed.) (2004). Deadball Stars of the National League, pp. 221–224. Brassey's. ISBN 1-57488-860-9.
