= Johnny Ritchey =

American baseball player

John Ritchey
- Catcher
- Born: San Diego, California, U.S.
- Died: January 14, 2003 (aged 80); Chula Vista, California, U.S.
- Batted: Left Threw: Right

Teams
- Chicago American Giants (1947)

Career highlights and awards
- Negro leagues batting champ (1947); Breitbard Hall of Fame induction (2017)

John Franklin Ritchey (January 5, 1923 – January 14, 2003) was an American professional baseball catcher.

Ritchey is recognized as one of the first African American men to play Minor League Baseball in the twentieth century, as he won batting titles in both the Negro leagues and Minor Leagues. Moreover, he was the first black player to perform in the Pacific Coast League in 32 years, when pitcher Jimmy Claxton passed as part Native American in 1916. Even though Ritchey never sought any laurels for integrating the PCL, he is commemorated with a bronze bust in Petco Park.

== Early life ==
Ritchey was born and raised in San Diego, California, as the youngest son of a famed athletic family. At an early age, he learned to play baseball with blacks and whites integrated at San Diego High School and in youth leagues in the area, as his teammates dubbed him Johnny Baseball for his passion and enthusiasm for the game.

As a high school student from 1938 through 1940, Ritchey was a three-year letterman and played in the school team under coach Mike Morrow. In the same period, he also played for three years with American Legion Baseball clubs, also coached by Morrow. At age 15, Ritchey and another black player, Nelson Manuel, starred on the Post Six American Legion squad that won the Junior World Series held at Spartanburg, South Carolina in 1938, even though neither could play in the tournament because in Spartanburg they did not allow blacks to share the game field with white players. Two years later, the Post 6 club, again led by Ritchey and Manuel, returned to the American Legion finals held in North Carolina. The two boys were allowed to play in the semifinals in Shelby, NC. When the team advanced to the finals in Albemarle, NC, Legion officials asked that the players be kept on the bench. Without two of their top players, San Diego lost the championship series to Albemarle, two games to three.

After high school, Ritchey enrolled at San Diego State College to study pre-law and play for the San Diego State Aztecs baseball. But a short time after that, he was recruited along with the rest of his generation and had to join the Army during World War II, serving 27 months in a combat engineering outfit and seeing service at the Invasion of Normandy and the Battle of the Bulge as well as in the South West Pacific theatre, while earning five battle stars along with staff sergeant stripes. Returning from the war, he went to college in 1946 to finishing his schooling and would star for the Aztecs, winning the Linn Platner Trophy as the Aztecs player with the highest batting average at .356 while setting a record of 25 stolen bases.

== Professional career ==
In 1947, Ritchey made his professional debut with the Chicago American Giants of the Negro American League. He posted a .381 batting average to lead the circuit, edging Birmingham Black Barons star shortstop Artie Wilson by just .008, as Jackie Robinson was making history and breaking the Color Barrier in Major League Baseball. Ritchey made history soon later, becoming the first ever African American to play in the Pacific Coast League.

With the color barrier already broken by Robinson, the Chicago Cubs scouted Ritchey while playing with the American Giants at Comiskey Park and invited him for a tryout at Wrigley Field in September 1948. Ritchey worked out for the Cubs for six hours, but no contract came. Instead, the Cubs suggested he play in the winter leagues, after which they might have sent him to their minor league system. Ritchey then returned to California, where the offer to play in his hometown in the Pacific Coast League was more attractive for him. At the time, the PCL was usually considered just a half-notch below the big leagues and sometimes like a third Major League. As a result, he joined the San Diego Padres in 1948. Ritchey would be joined later that year by Negro leaguers Booker McDaniels, Alonzo Perry, and the aforementioned Wilson.

In his rookie season, Ritchey would be in competition for the catching duties with veterans Hank Camelli and Len Rice, who were injured during spring training and Ritchey caught nearly the entirety of the season-opening series against the rival Los Angeles Angels. Not typically a power hitter, Ritchey went 8-for-16, including a game-winning, three-run home run in one contest. Still, when the other catchers were healthy again, he lost playing time and finished the year with only 253 plate appearances in 103 games, despite batting a slashing line of .323/.405/.442 with four homers, two triples, 10 doubles and 35 runs batted in.

In 1949, Ritchey slumped offensively to .257/.341/.321 with three homers and 12 stolen bases, though he recorded a solid .995 fielding average, while committing only two errors over 421 chances as a backup for Dee Moore.

Thereafter, Ritchey played for the Portland Beavers in part of two seasons spanning 1950–1951. In 1950, he slashed .270/.389/.361 with two homers and 34 RBI in 107 games. He then played only one game for Portland in 1951 before joining the Vancouver Capilanos, the Western International League farm club of the PCL Seattle Rainiers, where he enjoyed a career season, winning the WIL batting crown with a .346 average. He also posted career numbers in homers (7), RBI (86), runs scored (91), hits (156), doubles (26), steals (20), OBP (.492), SLG (.472), OPS (.965), receiving more walks than strikeouts (126 to 34) in 137 games.

Ritchey came back to Vancouver in 1952 and hit .343/.504/.447 in 137 games, including career-highs with 96 runs, eight triples and 27 stolen bases, once more receiving again more walks than strikeouts (144 to 30). He almost repeated as batting champion, losing the title just by .009 points.

After that, Ritchey had a second stint in the PCL, playing three seasons for the Sacramento Solons and San Francisco Seals from 1953 through 1955. He hit .291/.389/.399 for Sacramento in 1953, including 31 extra bases and 55 RBI in a career-high 147 games, but declined to .272/.379/.307 in 94 games the next season. He improved with San Francisco in 1955, hitting .285/.388/.379 in 130 games.

In between, Ritchey played winter ball with the Navegantes del Magallanes of the Venezuelan League in the 1948–49 and 1949–50 seasons. Overall. he hit .347 and slugged .469 during the two seasons. He also played three consecutive campaigns in the Mexican Pacific League, performing for the Ostioneros de Guaymas (1951–52), Naranjeros de Hermosillo (1952–53) and Tacuarineros de Culiacán (1953–54), batting .341 for Culiacán.

Ritchie spent his final season in the Eastern League in 1956, appearing in 16 games for the Syracuse Chiefs and hitting .185 (10-for-54) with two doubles.

== Post-playing career ==
After retiring from baseball, Ritchie returned to San Diego, where he and his wife Martina raised their three children. He got a job delivering milk for the Continental Baking Company, the maker of the Twinkie and Wonder Bread.

Ritchey later moved to Chula Vista, California where he died in 2003, nine days after his 80th birthday. He was remembered by the Los Angeles Times as "a standout catcher who broke the color barrier in the Pacific Coast League when he was signed by the minor league San Diego Padres in 1948."

Throughout his playing days, Ritchey also remained a dedicated family man. When a reporter asked him whether he took his wife and infant daughter to Venezuela with him in the winter of 1948, he replied, "I take them everywhere I go."

According to preeminent baseball historian William Swank, "He just wanted to play baseball and be judged on his ability and not the color of his skin". Speaking at Ritchey's funeral, Swank relayed to mourners a conversation the two of them had not long before Ritchey's death. "I told Johnny," Swank recalled, "'I know you never made it to the Major Leagues, but you're going into the Major Leagues now. One way or another, your bust is going into that new ballpark they're building in downtown San Diego."

In 2005, the San Diego Padres unveiled the bust in the PCL Bar & Grill at Petco Park along the first base line. Other recognition came in 2017, when Ritchey gained induction into the Breitbard Hall of Fame.
