= Jenny Maakal =

South African swimmer (1913–2002)

Personal information
- Born: August 2, 1913 Rayton, South Africa
- Died: September 15, 2002 (aged 89)

Sport
- Sport: Swimming
Medal record
Representing South Africa
Olympic Games
Bronze medal – third place	1932 Los Angeles	400 m freestyle
British Empire Games
Silver medal – second place	1934 London	440 yd freestyle
Silver medal – second place	1934 London	4×110 yd freestyle

Jenny Genoveva Maakal (2 August 1913 – 15 September 2002) was a South African freestyle swimmer who competed in the 1932 Summer Olympics.

She was born in Rayton.

In the 1932 Olympics she won a bronze medal in the 400 m freestyle event and was sixth in the 100 m freestyle event.

Maakal also competed in the 1930 British Empire Games and swam in two finals. Four years later she won the silver medal in the 440 yards freestyle competition and as member of the South African team in the 4×110 yards freestyle relay contest.

== See also ==
- List of Olympic medalists in swimming (women)
