= Bonnie Mealing =

Australian swimmer

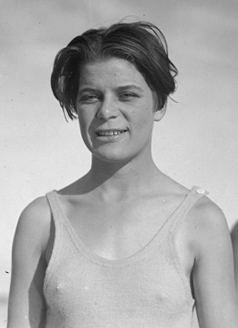
- Mealing in 1928

Personal information
- Full name: Phillomena Alecia Mealing
- Nickname: "Bonnie"
- National team: Australia
- Born: 28 July 1912 Woolloomooloo, New South Wales
- Died: 1 January 2002 (aged 89) Sydney, New South Wales
- Height: 1.60 m (5 ft 3 in)

Sport
- Sport: Swimming
- Strokes: Backstroke, freestyle
Medal record
Representing Australia
Olympic Games
Silver medal – second place	1932 Los Angeles	100 m backstroke

Phillomena Alecia "Bonnie" Mealing (28 July 1912 – 1 January 2002) was an Australian freestyle and backstroke swimmer of the 1920s and 1930s, who won a silver medal in the 100-metre backstroke at the 1932 Summer Olympics in Los Angeles, the first Australian to win a medal in backstroke.

At the age of 14 or 15, she was selected for the 1928 Summer Olympics in Amsterdam after only a year of competing at the national level. After a long three-month sea voyage, and a bout of homesickness, she gained weight during the voyage, finishing third and fourth in her heat of the 100-metre freestyle and backstroke respectively, and was eliminated. This brought condemnation from Australian journalists.

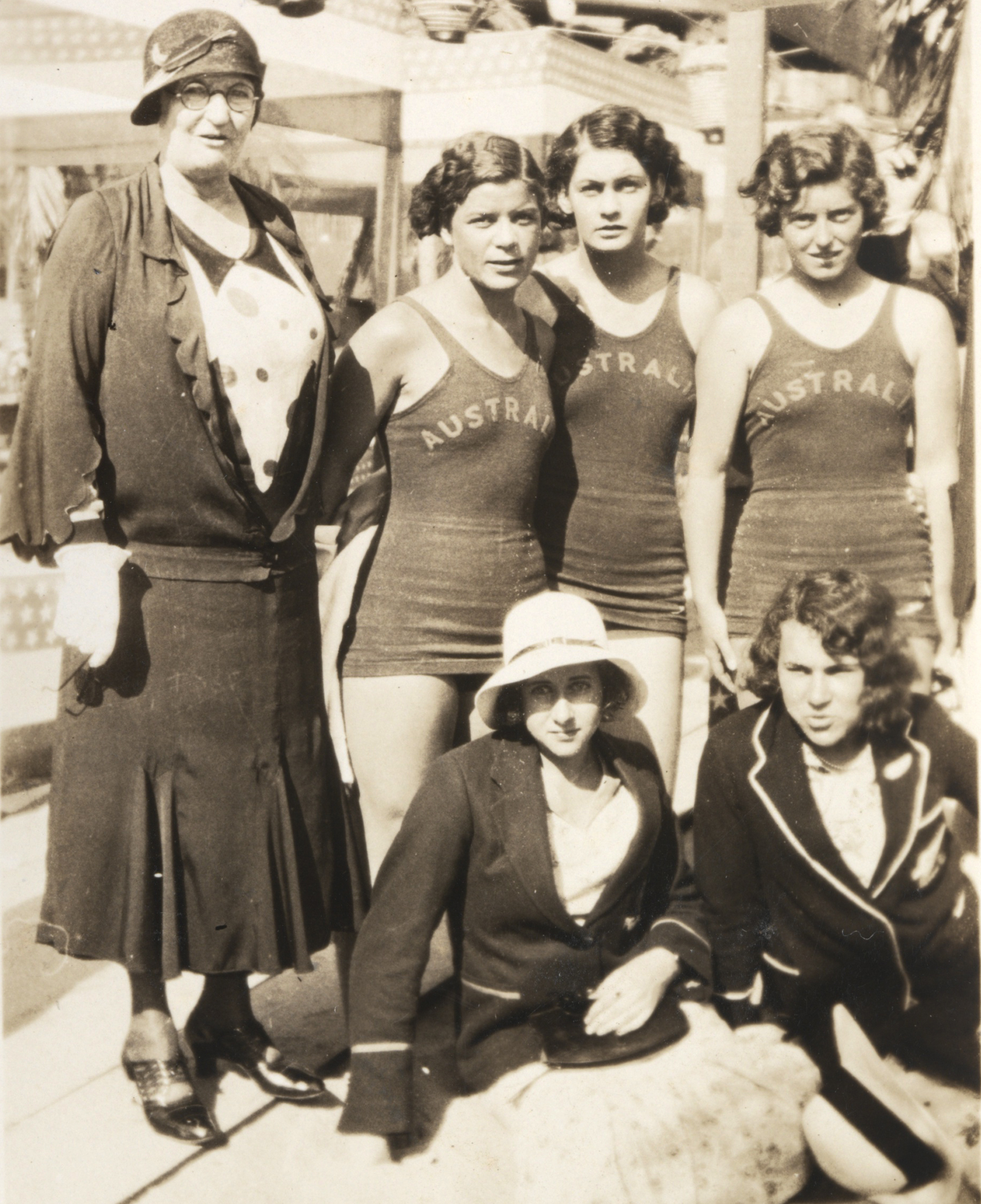
Mealing (left in costume) with 1932 Australian women's Olympic swim squad & chaperone.

After the Olympics, Mealing abandoned the freestyle events to concentrate on the backstroke, and in February 1930, she set a world record of 1m 20.6 seconds in the 100-metre backstroke. However, the Australian authorities decided against sending any female swimmers to the inaugural 1930 British Empire Games in Hamilton, Canada. By the time the 1932 Summer Olympics arrived, the 18-year-old American swimmer Eleanor Holm had already cut 2 seconds off her world record, and Holm easily defeated Mealing by 2 seconds to claim the gold.

In 1933, Mealing set a world record in the 200-metre backstroke, but then retired from swimming, foregoing an opportunity to win gold at the 1934 British Empire Games in London. Phyllis Harding of England, whom Mealing defeated in Los Angeles, claimed the gold.

At her death in 2002, Mealing was the last surviving Australian medalist from the 1932 Olympics and the last surviving member of the Australian team to the 1928 Olympics.

== Bibliography ==
- Andrews, Malcolm (2000). Australia at the Olympic Games. Sydney, New South Wales: ABC Books. pp. 286–287. ISBN 0-7333-0884-8.
