= San Diego Hall of Champions =

American museum in California

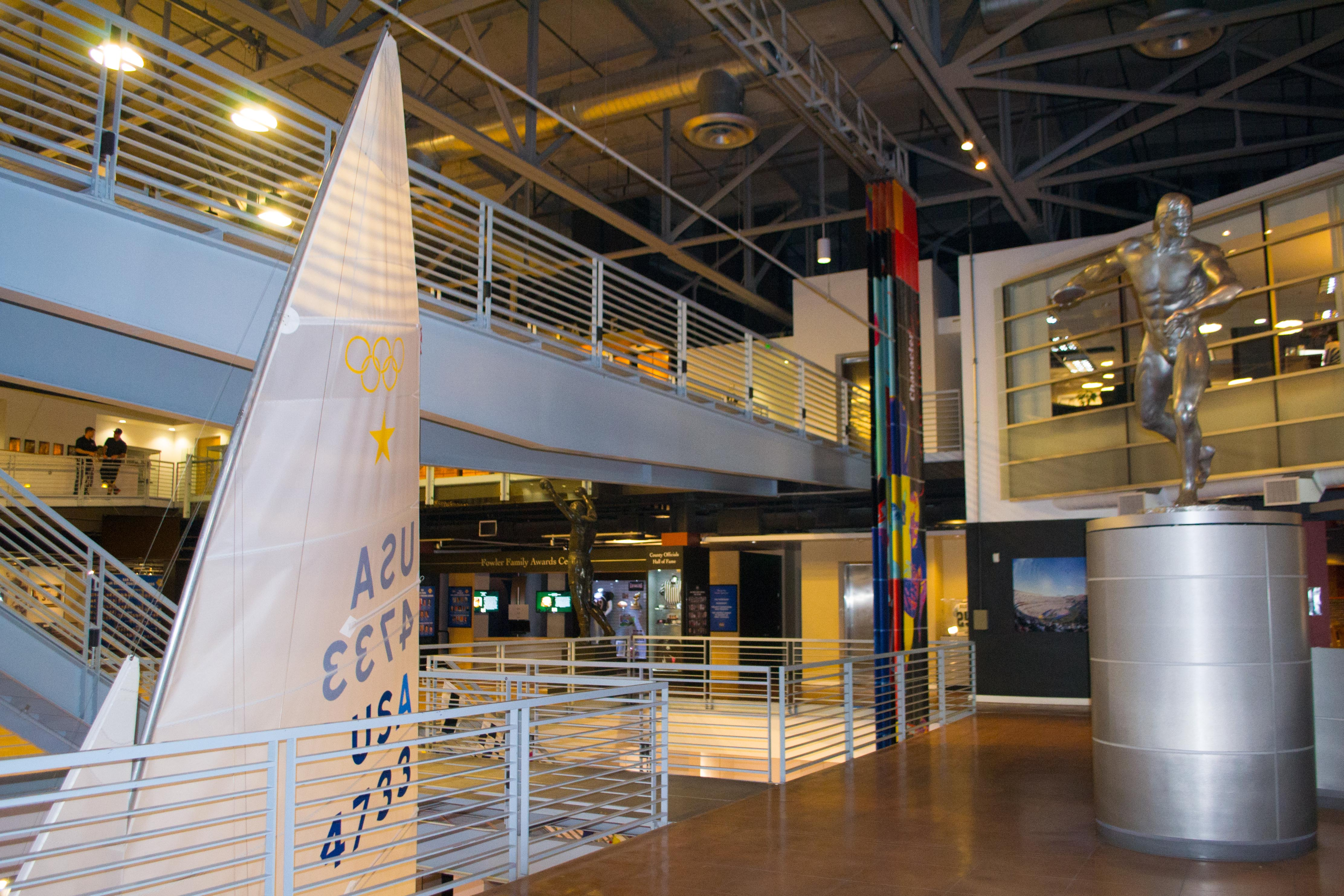
- San Diego Hall of Champions

- Location within San Diego Location within California Location within the United States
- Location: San Diego, California, U.S.
- Coordinates: 32°43′38.39″N 117°09′08.29″W

The San Diego Hall of Champions was an American multi-sport museum in San Diego, California, until its closure in June 2017. It housed the Breitbard Hall of Fame, San Diego's sports hall of fame, which is now located at Petco Park.

== Breitbard Hall of Fame ==
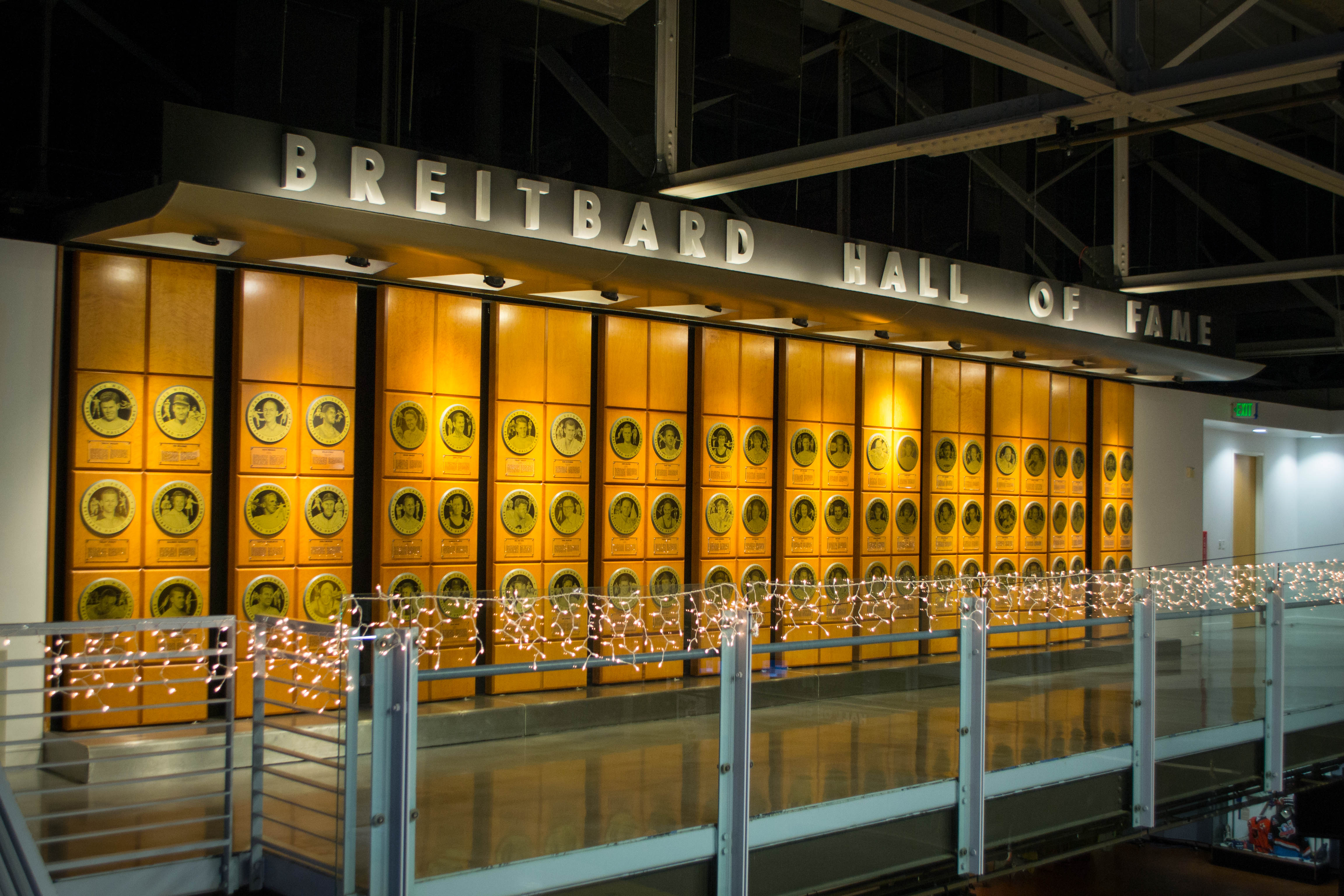
The Breitbard Hall of Fame

The Breitbard Hall of Fame was established in 1953 by Robert Breitbard. It honors athletes who either (1) have excelled in sports in San Diego or (2) are native San Diegans who have excelled in sports elsewhere. As of 2021, 163 athletes have been inducted, representing 22 sports: archery; badminton and tennis; baseball; basketball; bowling; boxing; diving and swimming; football; figure skating; golf; hockey; horse racing; marksmanship; motor sports; pole vaulting; sailing; skateboarding; soccer; surfing; track and field; triathlon; and wrestling. New members are inducted in February at the Salute to the Champions dinner.

=== Eligibility ===
To be eligible for enshrinement, the candidate must meet these criteria:

- An athlete, coach or special contributor native to San Diego county or who represented a San Diego high school, university, sports organization or professional team
- Professional athletes not native to San Diego county must have spent at least 4 years of their career in San Diego
- Athletes must be retired for at least 2 years or be at least 50 years old
- Coaches and contributors do not need to be retired, but must have spent at least 7 years working in their field

=== Inductees ===
For each inductee's San Diego connection, see footnote

Year inducted	Inductee	Sport
1953	Harold Muller	Football
1954	Ted Williams	Baseball
1955	Milton Phelps	Basketball
1956	Maureen Connolly	Tennis
1956	Archie Moore	Boxing
1957	Bill Miller	Track & Field
1958	David G. Freeman	Badminton
1958	Willie Steele	Track & Field
1959	Cotton Warburton	Football
1960	Earle Brucker, Sr.	Baseball
1960	Russ Saunders	Football
1962	Florence Chadwick	Aquatics
1962	Mickey Wright	Golf
1963	Billy Casper	Golf
1963	Gene Littler	Golf
1963	Clarence Pinkston	Aquatics
1964	Ed Goddard	Football
1964	Don Larsen	Baseball
1964	Pesky Sprott	Football
1965	Bob Gutowski	Track & Field
1965	Bill McColl	Football
1966	Paul Runyan	Golf
1967	Bob Elliott	Baseball
1967	Jim Londos	Wrestling
1967	Olin Cort Majors	Football
1968	Bud Held	Track & Field
1969	Lowell North	Sailing
1969	Harold Smith	Aquatics
1970	Stan Barnes	Football
1970	Florence Chambers	Swimming
1970	Billy Mills	Track & Field
1971	Karen Hantze Susman	Tennis
1972	Lance Alworth	Football
1972	Lee Ramage	Boxing
1973	Ray Boone	Baseball
1973	Amby Schindler	Football
1974	Leo Calland	Football
1974	Rube Powell	Archery
1975	Evelyn Boldrick Howard	Badminton
1975	Ron Mix	Football
1976	Tom Hamilton	Football
1976	Bob Skinner	Baseball
1977	Gerry Driscoll	Sailing
1977	Bobby Smith	Track & Field
1978	George Brown	Football
1978	Mike Stamm	Swimming
1979	Deron Johnson	Baseball
1979	Jack Rand	Track & Field
1980	Tex Guentert	Football
1980	Bud Muehleisen	Racquetball
1981	Bill McMillan	Marksmanship
1981	Marten Mendez	Badminton
1982	Bill Muncey	Hydroplane Racing
1982	Ralph Smith	Track & Field
1983	Andy Borthwick	Golf/Rowing
1983	Dennis Conner	Sailing
1984	John Butler	Football
1984	John Hadl	Football
1985	Malin Burnham	Sailing
1985	Gavy Cravath	Baseball
1985	Erik Larson	Figure Skating
1985	Arnie Robinson	Track & Field
1986	Charlie Joiner	Football
1986	Art Luppino	Football
1987	Don Coryell	Football
1987	Sid Gillman	Football
1987	Brian Sipe	Football
1988	Willie Banks	Track & Field
1988	Gary Garrison	Football
1989	Dan Fouts	Football
1990	Charles K. Fletcher	Swimming/Water Polo
1990	Bill Walton	Basketball
1991	Graig Nettles	Baseball
1991	Ed White	Football
1992	Bob Boone	Baseball
1992	Art Powell	Football
1993	Joe Alston	Badminton
1993	Haven Moses	Football
1993	Charlie Whittingham	Thoroughbred Racing
1994	Willie Buchanon	Football
1994	Hobbs Adams	Football/Baseball
1995	Kellen Winslow	Football
1995	Charlie Powell	Football/Boxing
1996	Randy Jones	Baseball
1996	Craig Stadler	Golf
1997	Earl Faison	Football
1997	Juli Veee	Soccer
1998	Fred Dryer	Football
1998	Alan Trammell	Baseball
1998	Dave Winfield	Baseball
1999	Marcus Allen	Football
1999	Rolf Benirschke	Football
2000	Rollie Fingers	Baseball
2000	Paula Newby-Fraser	Triathlon
2001	Keith Lincoln	Football
2001	Joe Norris	Bowling
2001	Ken Norton	Boxing
2002	Tony Gwynn	Baseball
2002	Tony Hawk	Skateboarding
2002	Russ Washington	Football
2003	Elvin Hayes	Basketball
2003	Ron Newman	Soccer
2003	Mark Reynolds	Sailing
2004	Stan Humphries	Football
2004	Peter McNab	Hockey
2005	Joseph Jessop	Sailing
2005	Ernie Ladd	Football
2005	Scott Simpson	Golf
2005	Doug Wilkerson	Football
2006	Terrell Davis	Football
2006	Gail Devers	Track and field
2006	Louie Kelcher	Football
2006	Volney Peters	Football
2007	Buzzie Bavasi	Baseball
2007	Goose Gossage	Baseball
2007	Gary "Big Hands" Johnson	Football
2008	Shannon MacMillan	Soccer
2008	Pete Newell	Basketball
2008	Willie O'Ree	Hockey
2008	Steve Scott	Track and field
2009	Marshall Faulk	Football
2009	Ivan Stewart	Off-road racing
2009	Floyd Robinson	Baseball
2009	Eric Allen	Football
2010	Bob Larsen	Cross country / Track
2010	David Grayson	Football
2010	Greg Louganis	Diving
2010	David Wells	Baseball
2010	J. J. Fetter	Sailing
2011	John Lynch	Football
2011	La'Roi Glover	Football
2011	Lincoln Kennedy	Football
2011	Paul Lowe	Football
2012	C. R. Roberts	Football
2012	Art Williams	Basketball
2012	Monique Henderson	Track and Field
2012	Bernie Bickerstaff	Basketball
2013	Junior Seau	Football
2013	Trevor Hoffman	Baseball
2013	Brian Quinn	Soccer
2013	Stephen Neal	Football / Wrestling
2014	Damon Allen	Football
2014	Ricky Johnson	Motor sports / NASCAR
2014	Chris Marlowe	Volleyball
2014	Teri McKeever	Swimming
2015	Chris Chambliss	Baseball
2015	Tony Clark	Baseball
2015	LaDainian Tomlinson	Football
2016	Ricky Williams	Football
2016	Paul Vaden	Boxing
2016	Dave Roberts	Baseball
2017	Nick Hardwick	Football
2017	Johnny Ritchey	Baseball
2017	Candice Wiggins	Basketball
2018	Garry Templeton	Baseball
2018	Robbie Haines	Sailing
2018	Claude Gilbert	Football
2020	Rob Machado	Surfing
2020	Jerry Coleman	Baseball
2020	Reggie Bush	Football
2021	Antonio Gates	Football
2021	Laurel (Brassey) Iverson	Volleyball
2021	Rachel (Buehler) Van Hollebeke	Soccer

== See also ==
- San Diego Padres Hall of Fame, local baseball team's hall of fame
- California Sports Hall of Fame
