= Frances Bult =

Australian swimmer

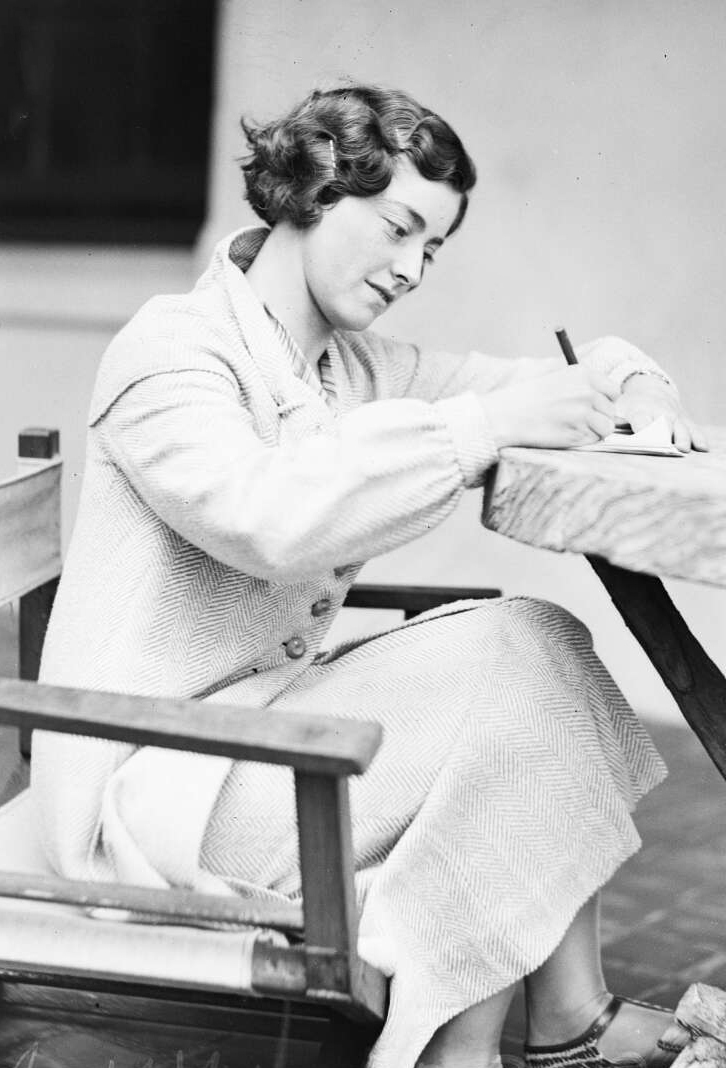
- Bult in 1934

Personal information
- Full name: Neville Frances Bult
- National team: Australia
- Born: 27 June 1913 Melbourne, Victoria
- Died: 30 June 2008 (aged 95) Melbourne, Victoria
- Height: 1.63 m (5 ft 4 in)

Sport
- Sport: Swimming
- Strokes: Freestyle

Neville Frances Bult (27 June 1913 – 30 June 2008), later known by her married name Frances Vorrath, was an Australian freestyle swimmer who competed in the 1932 Summer Olympics. She was an Olympic finalist who finished fifth in the 100 metre freestyle. She also competed in the 400-metre freestyle event and was eliminated in the first round after a third place in her heat.

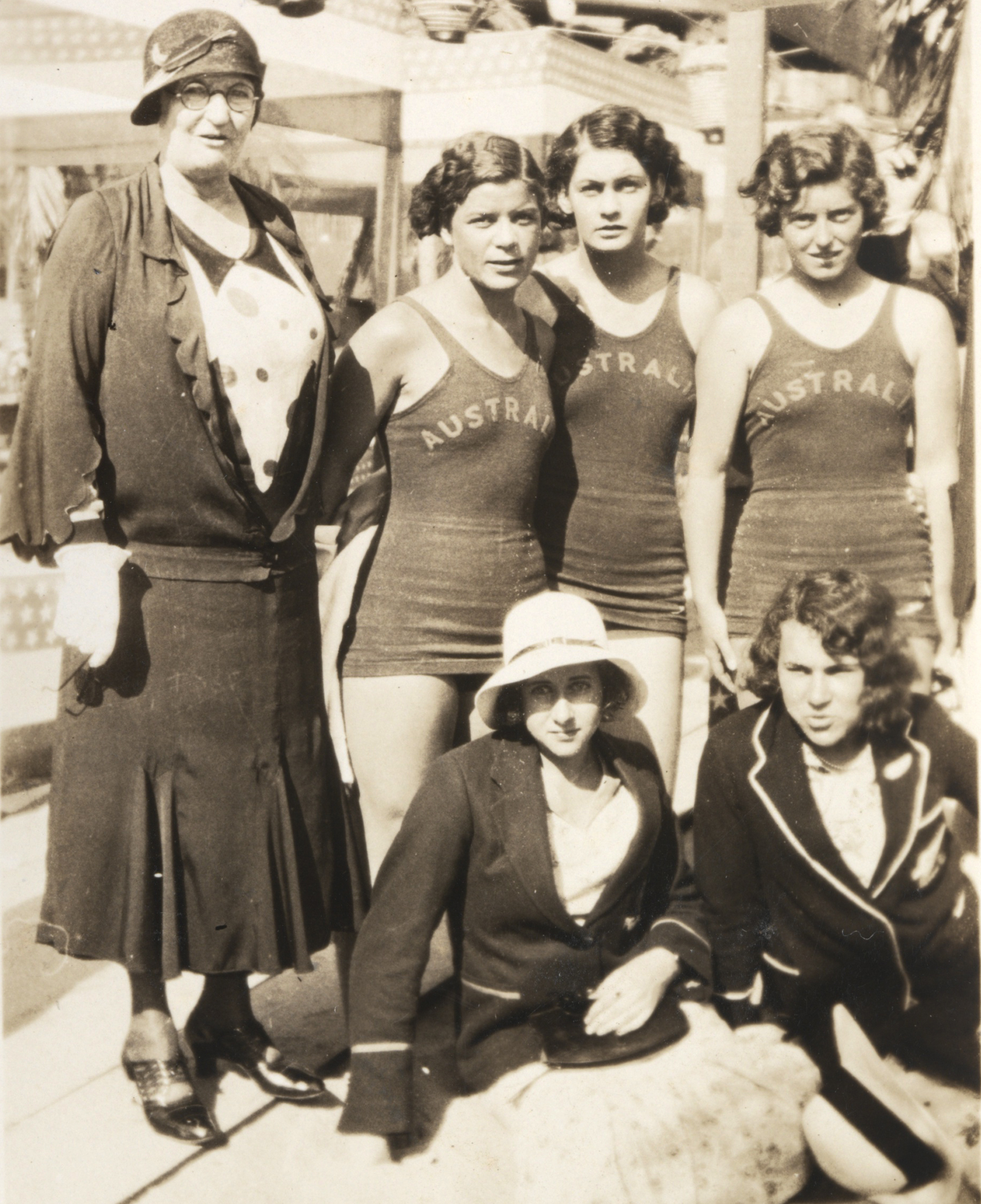
Bult (right in costume) with 1932 Australian women's Olympic swim squad & chaperone
