= Eleanor Holm =

American swimmer (1912–2004)

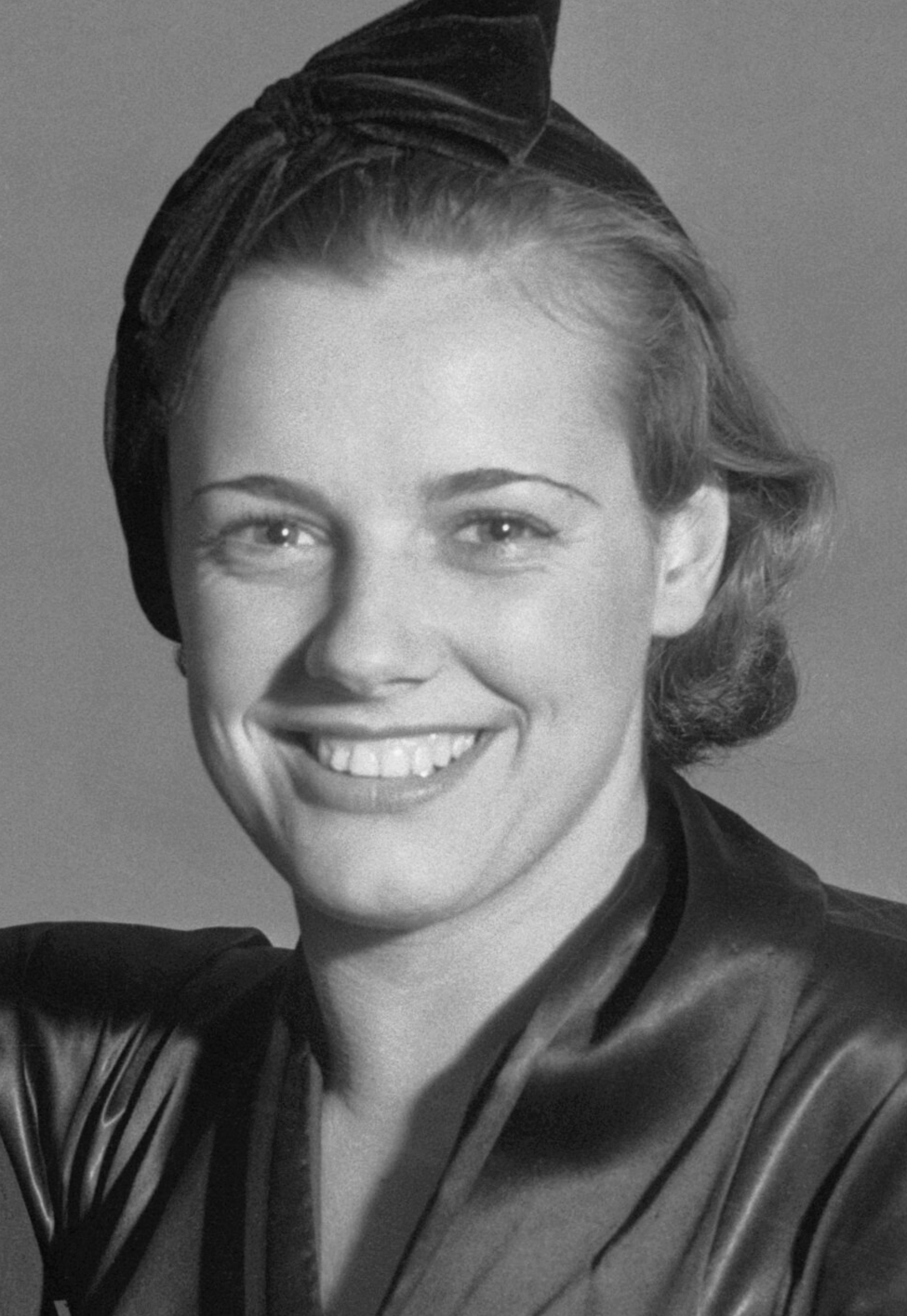
- Holm in 1932

Personal information
- Full name: Eleanor Grace Theresa Holm
- National team: United States
- Born: December 6, 1913 Brooklyn, New York, U.S.
- Died: January 31, 2004 (aged 91) Miami, Florida, U.S.
- Spouses: Art Jarrett (m. 1933; div. 1938) Billy Rose (m. 1939; div. 1954) Thomas Joseph Whalen (m. 1954; died 1986)

Sport
- Sport: Swimming
- Strokes: Backstroke
- Club: Women's Swimming Association of New York
Medal record
Representing the United States
Olympic Games
Gold medal – first place	1932 Los Angeles	100 m backstroke

Eleanor Grace Theresa Holm (December 6, 1913 – January 31, 2004) was an American competition swimmer and Olympic gold medalist. An Olympian in 1928 and 1932, Holm was expelled from the 1936 Summer Olympics team by Avery Brundage under controversial circumstances. Holm went on to have a high-profile career as a socialite and interior designer and co-starred in a Hollywood Tarzan movie, Tarzan's Revenge.

== Biography ==
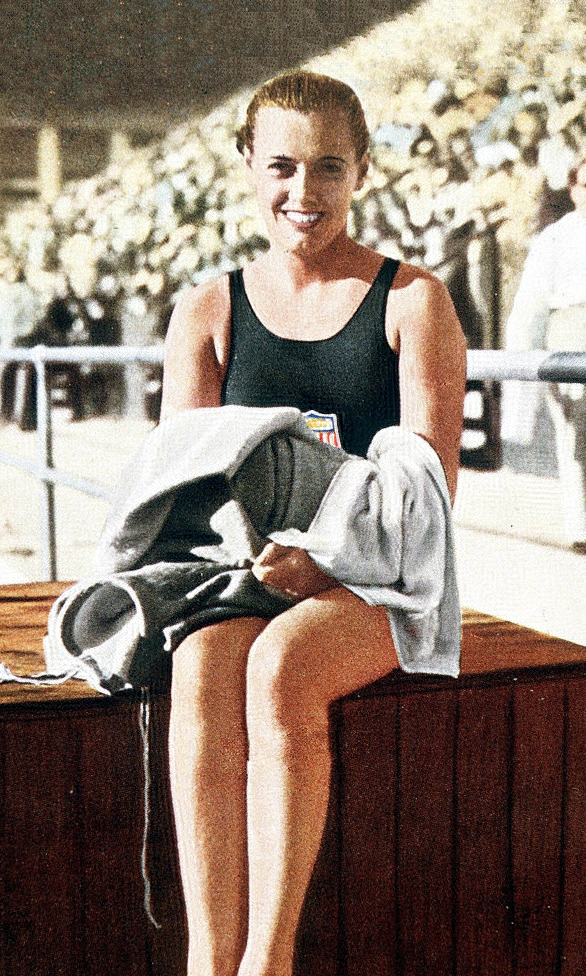
Holm at the 1932 Olympics

Holm was born in Brooklyn, New York, the youngest of seven children of Charlotte (née Long) and Franklin Holm, a fireman and aunt to professional basketball player Bobby Holm. She graduated from Erasmus Hall High School.

Holm learned to swim while very young, winning her first national swimming title at age 13. Holm was selected to compete in the 1928 Summer Olympics, where she finished fifth in her specialty, the 100-meter backstroke. Holm was also talented in several other strokes, winning several American titles in the 300-yard medley event.

At the 1932 Summer Olympics in Los Angeles, Holm won the gold medal in her favorite event, though defending champion Marie Braun had to forfeit the final due to an insect bite. "I was hardly dry at those Olympics when I was whisked from one studio to another – Warner Brothers, MGM, Paramount – to take screen tests," Holm told the New York Times in 1984.

In 1932, Holm was one of the fifteen girls named as WAMPAS Baby Stars, including Ginger Rogers, Mary Carlisle, and Gloria Stuart. One of her first assignments at Warner Bros. was to join a trainload of actors and Busby Berkeley chorus girls on a barnstorming trip across the country in early 1933 to publicize the movie musical 42nd Street and to show support for the newly elected president Franklin D. Roosevelt at his first inauguration in Washington, DC.

The following year, on September 2, 1933, Holm married her first husband, Art Jarrett, a fellow graduate of Erasmus Hall High School in Brooklyn, after a whirlwind five-month romance. He was a singer and bandleader at the Cocoanut Grove nightclub. Holm even performed with his band while wearing a white bathing suit, white cowboy hat, and high heels, singing "I'm an Old Cowhand (From the Rio Grande)". "I'm an Old Cowhand", words and music by Johnny Mercer, was written for the 1936 movie Rhythm on the Range.

Holm competed as Eleanor Holm Jarrett and qualified for the 1936 Summer Olympics in Berlin, Germany. After a drinking party aboard the SS Manhattan on the way to the Olympics, the team doctor found Holm in a state approaching a coma. According to David Wallechinsky in The Complete Book of the Summer Olympics, the Olympic team doctor's diagnosis was "[a]cute alcoholism". Various charges were made against her, which Holm did not deny. U.S. Olympic Committee President Avery Brundage promptly expelled her from the Olympic team. Holm admitted to having had a few glasses of Champagne but subsequently maintained that her dismissal arose from a personal grudge held by Brundage.

This chaperone came up to me and told me it was time to go to bed. God, it was about 9 o'clock, and who wanted to go down in that basement to sleep anyway? So I said to her: "Oh, is it really bedtime? Did you make the Olympic team or did I?" I had had a few glasses of Champagne. So she went to Brundage and complained that I was setting a bad example for the team, and they got together and told me the next morning that I was fired. I was heartbroken.

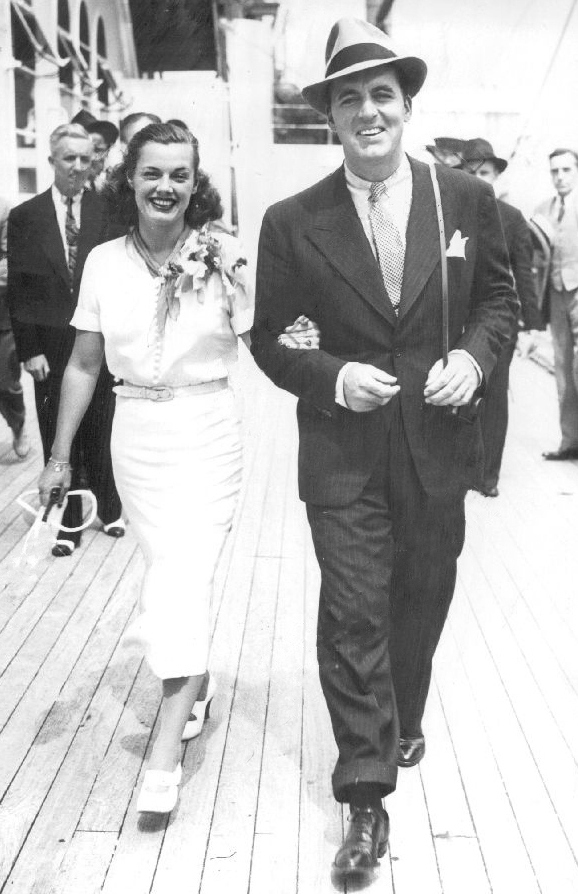
Holm and Art Jarrett in 1936

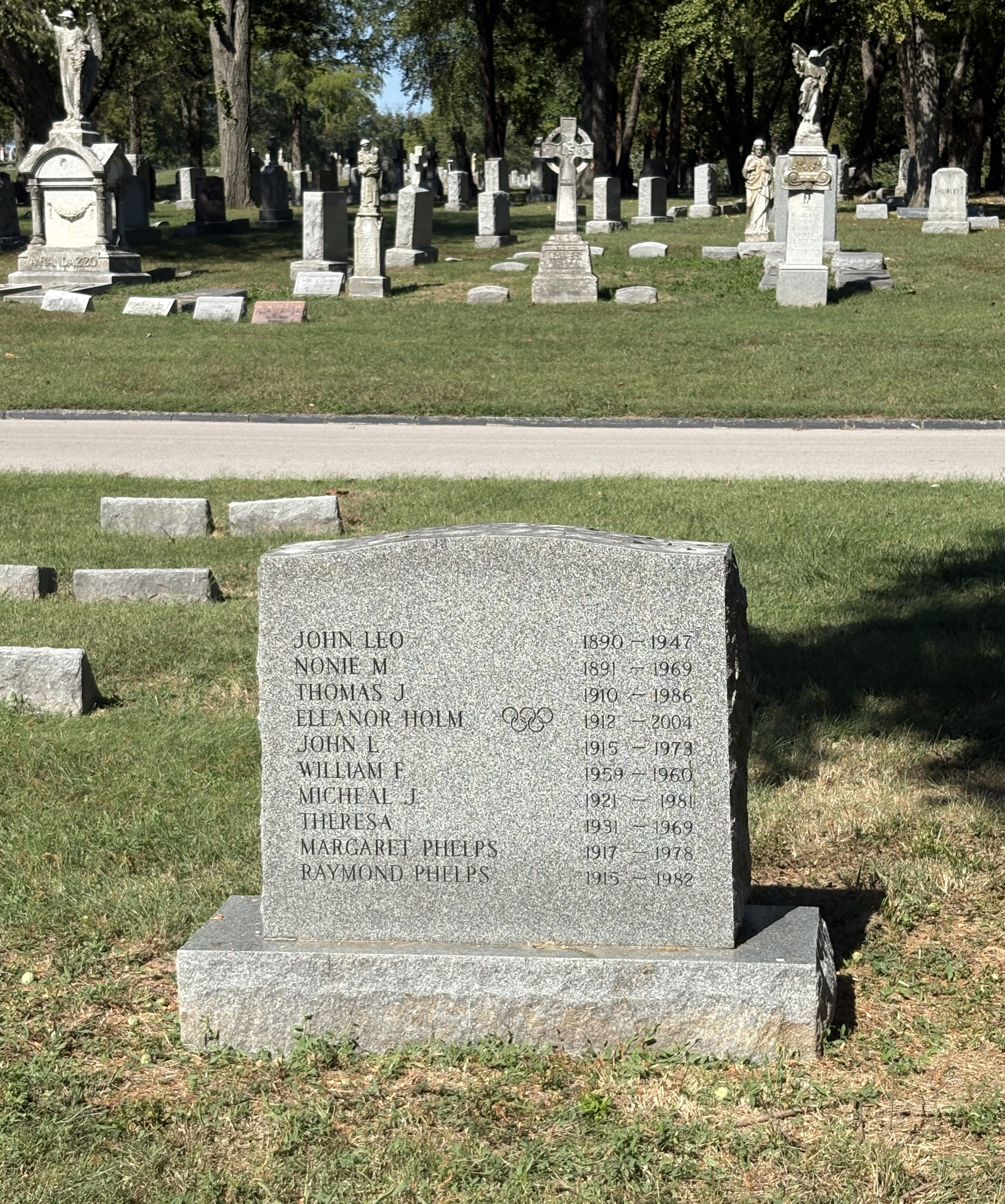
Holm's grave at Calvary Cemetery

Despite a petition signed by more than half the U.S. Olympic team, Brundage, who went on to become the president of the International Olympic Committee, refused to reconsider. Holm had been the top favorite for the 100-meter backstroke event, and she watched from the stands as the gold medal went to Dutch swimmer Nida Senff. Decades later, Holm told Olympic sprinter Dave Sime that Brundage held a grudge from an incident in which he propositioned her, and she turned him down.

Although she appeared in at least four films as herself, Holm appeared in only one Hollywood feature film, starring opposite fellow Olympian Glenn Morris in the 1938 film Tarzan's Revenge. On November 10, 1939, a year after Jarrett divorced her, claiming that his wife's expulsion from the 1936 Olympics and her affair with another man had caused him embarrassment, Holm married her lover, impresario Billy Rose, who had divorced first wife Fanny Brice. At the 1939 New York World's Fair, Holm did 39 shows a week at Rose's "Aquacade", co-featured with Tarzan swimmer Johnny Weissmuller and, later, Buster Crabbe. In 1954, Holm divorced Rose – receiving $30,000 per month (equivalent to $360,000 today) in alimony and a lump sum of $200,000 ($2,400,000 today) to be paid in 10 yearly installments, according to The New York Times. This sensational divorce trial was called "the war of the Roses" and is the subject of a chapter in Louis Nizer's book My Life in Court. Several months later, Holm married Thomas Joseph Whalen, an oil-drilling executive. They remained married until his death in 1986. All of the unions were childless. In 1966, Holm was inducted into the International Swimming Hall of Fame.

Holm died of renal disease in Miami, Florida, on January 31, 2004, at the age of 91. She was buried at Calvary Cemetery in St. Louis.

== In popular culture ==
Holm is portrayed by the synchronized swimmer Heidi O'Rourke, who bore a close resemblance to her, in the 1975 film Funny Lady.

A protagonist based on Eleanor Holm, with the fictionalized name Eleanor Emerson, appears in the 2012 novel Flight from Berlin by David John, published by HarperCollins.

== See also ==
- List of members of the International Swimming Hall of Fame
- List of Olympic medalists in swimming (women)

== Bibliography ==
- William O. Johnson, All That Glitters Is Not Gold
- Lewis H. Carlson and John J. Fogarty, Tales of Gold
