= Canada at the 1932 Summer Olympics =

- IOC code: CAN
- NOC: Canadian Olympic Committee

in Los Angeles, United States July 29-August 14, 1932
- Competitors: 102 in 10 sports
- Flag bearer: George Maughan
- Medals Ranked 12th: Gold 2 Silver 5 Bronze 8 Total 15

Summer Olympics appearances (overview)
- ~~1900~~; 1904; 1908; 1912; 1920; 1924; 1928; 1932; 1936; 1948; 1952; 1956; 1960; 1964; 1968; 1972; 1976; 1980; 1984; 1988; 1992; 1996; 2000; 2004; 2008; 2012; 2016; 2020; 2024; 2028

Other related appearances
- 1906 Intercalated Games

Canada competed at the 1932 Summer Olympics in Los Angeles, United States. Despite the games being held during the Great Depression, Canada sent its second largest team to date. 102 competitors, 85 men and 17 women, took part in 69 events in 10 sports.

Canadian Olympic Committee member W. A. Fry self-published a book covering Canadian achievements at the 1932 Winter Olympics and 1932 Summer Olympics. His 1933 book, Canada at the tenth Olympiad, 1932 : Lake Placid, New York, Feb. 4 to 13 - Los Angeles, California, July 30 to Aug. 14, was printed by the Dunnville Chronicle presses and dedicated to Canadian sportsperson Francis Nelson who died in 1932.

== Medallists ==
=== Gold ===
- Duncan McNaughton – Athletics, men's high jump
- Horace Gwynne – Boxing, men's bantamweight

=== Silver ===
- Alex Wilson – Athletics, men's 800 m
- Hilda Strike – Athletics, women's 100 m
- Mildred Fizzell, Lillian Palmer, Mary Frizzel and Hilda Strike – Athletics, women's 4 × 100 m relay
- Ernest Cribb, Harry Jones, Peter Gordon, Hubert Wallace, Ronald Maitland, and George Gyles – Sailing, 8 m class
- Daniel MacDonald – Wrestling, men's welterweight (66–72 kg)

=== Bronze ===
- Phil Edwards – Athletics, men's 800 m
- Phil Edwards – Athletics, men's 1500 m
- Alex Wilson – Athletics, men's 400 m
- Raymond Lewis, James Ball, Phil Edwards, and Alex Wilson – Athletics, men's 4 × 400 m relay
- Eva Dawes – Athletics, women's high jump
- Charles E. Pratt and Noel De Mille – Rowing, men's double sculls
- Earl Eastwood, Joseph Harris, Stanley Stanyar, Harry Fry, Cedric Liddell, William Thoburn, Don Boal, Albert Taylor, and Les MacDonald – Rowing, men's eights with coxswain
- Philip Rogers, Gerald Wilson, Gardner Boultbee, and Kenneth Glass – Sailing, 6 m class

== Athletics ==
Key

- Note–Ranks given for track events are within the athlete's heat only
- Q = Qualified for the next round

Men
Track & road events

Athlete	Event	Heat		Quarterfinal		Semifinal		Final	
Athlete	Event	Result	Rank	Result	Rank	Result	Rank	Result	Rank
Percy Williams	100 m	11.1	3 Q	10.7	3 Q	10.91	4	Did not advance	
Birchall Pearson	100 m	11.1	2 Q	10.7	3 Q	10.95	5	Did not advance	
Harold Madison Wright	100 m	11.2	2 Q	10.9	2 Q	11.1	6	Did not advance	
Harold Madison Wright	200 m	22.8	1 Q	21.7	2 Q	21.8	4	Did not advance	
Birchall Pearson	200 m	22.3	1 Q	21.7	2 Q	21.9	6	Did not advance	
Alex Wilson	400 m	50.5	3 Q	49.6	4 Q	47.8	2 Q	47.4	3rd place, bronze medalist(s)
Jimmy Ball	400 m	50.0	2 Q	49.3	4 Q	49.0	6	Did not advance	
Ray Lewis	400 m	50.7	2 Q	49.1	5	Did not advance			
Phil Edwards	800 m	—N/a				1:55.1	2 Q	1:51.5	3rd place, bronze medalist(s)
Alex Wilson	800 m	—N/a				1:52.5	2 Q	1:49.9	2nd place, silver medalist(s)
Eddie King	800 m	—N/a				1:54.4	4	Did not advance	
Phil Edwards	1500 m	—N/a				4:03.5	4 Q	3:52.8	3rd place, bronze medalist(s)
Eddie King	1500 m	—N/a				3:58.6	3 Q	DNS	
Les Wade	1500 m	—N/a				4:00.5	5	Did not advance	
Scotty Rankine	5000 m	—N/a				15:39.6	5 Q	15:24.0	11
Clifford Bricker	10,000 m	—N/a						Unknown	8
Art Ravensdale	110 m hurdles	15.2	4	—N/a		Did not advance			
Tom Coulter	400 m hurdles	DSQ		—N/a		Did not advance			
Percy Williams; Jim Brown; Harold Wright; Bert Pearson	4 × 100 m relay	45.0	3 Q	—N/a				41.3	4
Ray Lewis; Jimmy Ball; Phil Edwards; Alex Wilson	4 × 400 m relay	3:21.8	3 Q	—N/a				3:12.8	3rd place, bronze medalist(s)
Clifford Bricker	Marathon	—N/a						2:47:58	12
Johnny Miles	Marathon	—N/a						2:50:32	14
Eddie Cudworth	Marathon	—N/a						2:58:35	18
Henry Cieman	50 km walk	—N/a						DNF	

Field events

Athlete	Event	Final	
Athlete	Event	Result	Rank
Len Hutton	Long jump	DNS	12
Jack Portland	Triple jump	NM	
Duncan McNaughton	High jump	1.97	1st place, gold medalist(s)

Women
Track & road events

Athlete	Event	Heat		Semifinal		Final	
Athlete	Event	Result	Rank	Result	Rank	Result	Rank
Hilda Strike	100 m	12.3	3 Q	12.4	1 Q	11.9	2nd place, silver medalist(s)
Mary Frizzell	100 m	12.1	2 Q	12.3	5	Did not advance	
Mary Vandervliet	100 m	12.3	2 Q	12.3	4	Did not advance	
Betty Taylor	80 m hurdles	12.0	4	—N/a		Did not advance	
Alda Wilson	80 m hurdles	12.1	3	—N/a		12.0	6
Mildred Fizzell; Lillian Palmer; Mary Frizzell; Hilda Strike	4 × 100 m relay	—N/a				47.0 WR	2nd place, silver medalist(s)

Field events

Athlete	Event	Final	
Athlete	Event	Result	Rank
Eva Dawes	High jump	1.60	3rd place, bronze medalist(s)

== Cycling ==
Seven cyclists, all men, represented Canada in 1932.

Individual road race

- Glen Robbins
- James Jackson
- Frank Elliott
- Ernie Gates

Team road race

- Glen Robbins
- James Jackson
- Frank Elliott
- Ernie Gates

Sprint

- Leo Marchiori

Time trial

- Lew Rush

Team pursuit

- Lew Rush
- Glen Robbins
- Russ Hunt
- Frank Elliott

== Diving ==
Men

Athlete	Event	Final	
Athlete	Event	Points	Rank
Alfred Phillips	3 m springboard	134.64	4
Arthur Stott	3 m springboard	110.22	11
Alfred Phillips	10 m platform	77.10	7

Women

Athlete	Event	Final	
Athlete	Event	Points	Rank
Doris Ogilvie	3 m springboard	70.00	5

== Fencing ==
Five fencers, four men and a woman, represented Canada in 1932.

Men's foil

- Ernest Dalton
- Bertram Markus

Men's épée

- Patrick Farrell
- Ernest Dalton
- Bertram Markus

Men's team épée

- Ernest Dalton, Bertram Markus, Patrick Farrell, Henri Delcellier

Men's sabre

- Patrick Farrell

Women's foil

- Joan Archibald

== Swimming ==
Men

Athlete	Event	Heat		Semifinal		Final	
Athlete	Event	Time	Rank	Time	Rank	Time	Rank
Munroe Bourne	100 m freestyle	1:01.1	8	Did not advance			
Robert Halloran	100 m freestyle	1:06.9	20	Did not advance			
Walter Spence	100 m freestyle	59.3	2 Q	59.6	8	Did not advance	
George Burrows	400 m freestyle	5:28.9	15	Did not advance			
George Larson	400 m freestyle	5:20.1	14	Did not advance			
Walter Spence	400 m freestyle	5:10.0	11 qq	5:15.6	11	Did not advance	
George Burrows	1500 m freestyle	22:19.6	12	Did not advance			
Munroe Bourne	100 m backstroke	1:14.3	10 QQ	1:13.9	11	Did not advance	
Robert Halloran	100 m backstroke	1:14.2	9	Did not advance			
Dennis Walker	100 m backstroke	1:21.0	14	Did not advance			
Walter Spence	200 m breaststroke	2:56.5	10 Q	2:52.7	8	Did not advance	
Richard Wyndham	200 m breaststroke	3:12.4	16	Did not advance			
George Larson; George Burrows; Munroe Bourne; Walter Spence	4 × 200 metre freestyle relay	—N/a				9:36.3	4

Women

Athlete	Event	Heat		Semifinal		Final	
Athlete	Event	Time	Rank	Time	Rank	Time	Rank
Marjorie Linton	100 m freestyle	1:19.9	19	Did not advance			
Irene Mullen	100 m freestyle	1:15.2	14	Did not advance			
Irene Pirie	100 m freestyle	1:16.3	17	Did not advance			
Betty Edwards	400 m freestyle	6:27.2	14	Did not advance			
Ruth Kerr	400 m freestyle	6:25.7	13	Did not advance			
Irene Pirie	400 m freestyle	6:22.2	12	Did not advance			
Ruth Kerr	100 m backstroke	—N/a		1:28.2	10	Did not advance	
Marjorie Linton	100 m backstroke	—N/a		1:29.1	11	Did not advance	
Dorothy Prior	200 m breaststroke	—N/a		3:33.2	10	Did not advance	
Janet Sheather	200 m breaststroke	—N/a		3:46.1	11	Did not advance	
Irene Pirie; Irene Mullen; Ruth Kerr; Betty Edwards	4 × 100 metre freestyle relay	—N/a				5:05.7	4
