= Fencing at the 1932 Summer Olympics – Men's épée =

Fencing at the Olympics

Men's épée at the Games of the X Olympiad
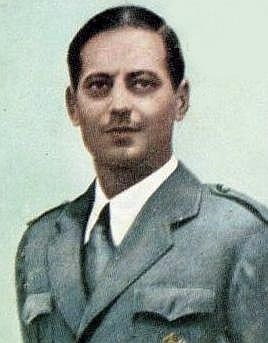
- Gold medalist Giancarlo Cornaggia-Medici
- Venue: 160th Regiment State Armory
- Dates: 8–9 August 1932
- Competitors: 28 from 12 nations

Medalists
1st place, gold medalist(s)		Giancarlo Cornaggia-Medici; Italy
2nd place, silver medalist(s)		Georges Buchard; France
3rd place, bronze medalist(s)		Carlo Agostoni; Italy

The men's épée was one of seven fencing events on the fencing at the 1932 Summer Olympics programme. It was the eighth appearance of the event. The competition was held from 8 August 1932 to 9 August 1932. 28 fencers from 12 nations competed, with three others entered but not starting. A maximum of three fencers per nation could compete. The event was won by Giancarlo Cornaggia-Medici of Italy, with his countryman Carlo Agostoni taking bronze. They were the first medals for Italy in the men's individual épée. France reached the podium for the fourth consecutive Games in the event with Georges Buchard's silver. Buchard was the third man to win multiple medals in the event, repeating his second-place finish from 1928.

== Background ==
This was the eighth appearance of the event, which was not held at the first Games in 1896 (with only foil and sabre events held) but has been held at every Summer Olympics since 1900.

Two of the 10 finalists from the 1928 Games returned: silver medalist (and 1924 finalist) Georges Buchard of France and bronze medalist George Calnan of the United States. Buchard was the reigning (1931) World Champion; he had also won in 1927 and would win again in 1933. He and fellow French fencer Philippe Cattiau, the 1929 and 1930 World Champion, were the favorites in the event.

For the first time, no nations made their debut in the event. Belgium and the United States each appeared for the seventh time, tied for most among nations.

== Competition format ==
The competition format continued the pool play round-robin from prior years, but increased the number of touches to win a bout to 3. With fewer fencers than in prior Games, the number of rounds was reduced from four to three. A point system was used, with 2 points for a win, 1 point for a tie, and 0 points for a loss. The total number of touches received was used as the first tie-breaker. Touches scored was used as the second in the final. It also was apparently used in the earlier rounds for the most part, though the official placing for 8th and 9th in round 1 pool 1 is inconsistent.

- Quarterfinals: 3 pools of between 9 and 11 fencers each. The top 7 fencers in the first two pools (each scheduled to have 11 fencers) and the top 6 fencers in the third pool (scheduled to have 9 fencers) advanced to the semifinals.
- Semifinals: 2 pools of 10 fencers each. The top 6 fencers in each pool advanced to the final.
- Final: 1 pool of 12 fencers.

== Schedule ==
Date	Time	Round
Monday, 8 August 1932	9:00; 13:00	Quarterfinals; Semifinals
Tuesday, 9 August 1932	13:00	Final

== Results ==
=== Quarterfinals ===
The top 7 finishers in pools 1 and 2 and the top 6 finishers in pool 3 advanced to the semifinals.

==== Quarterfinal 1 ====
It is unclear why Markus is ranked ahead of Corbin; being equal on points and touches received, Corbin's touches scored should have ranked him higher.

Rank	Fencer	Nation	Points	TS	TR	Notes
1	Saverio Ragno	Italy	16	24	10	Q
2	Georges Buchard	France	12	21	13	Q
3	Balthazar De Beukelaer	Belgium	10	19	14	Q
4	Sven Thofelt	Sweden	8	17	15	Q
5	Aage Leidersdorff	Denmark	7	18	20	Q
6	Eduardo Prieto	Mexico	7	17	20	Q
7	Doris de Jong	Netherlands	4	15	20	Q
8	Bertram Markus	Canada	4	10	21	
9	Harold Corbin	United States	4	13	21	
—	Erwin Casmir	Germany	DNS			
—	Somfai	Hungary	DNS			

==== Quarterfinal 2 ====
5 bouts in the round-robin were skipped (Agostini-Schmetz, Agostini-Saucedo, Saucedo-de Graffenried, Poplimont-Calnan, and Poplimont-Petneházy).

The Official Report lists the bout between Farrell and Delgadillo as 2–2, but Sports-Reference reports a 3–2 Farrell win. The latter is consistent with Farrell having 7 points, as reported in both sources, and Delgadillo having 4, as listed in Sports-Reference. The Official Report lists Delgadillo as having 6 points, which is inconsistent with either a tie or loss. Both sources, however, list Delgadillo as having received 26 touches; if the result of the bout was 3–2 for Farrell, this number should be 27.

The Official Report does not explain why Lindman advanced to the semifinals rather than Farrell.

Rank	Fencer	Nation	Points	TS	TR	Notes
1	Carlo Agostoni	Italy	16	24	6	Q
2	Bernard Schmetz	France	15	24	11	Q
3	Raúl Saucedo	Argentina	13	22	11	Q
4	André Poplimont	Belgium	13	22	15	Q
5	George Calnan	United States	12	24	17	Q
6	Paul de Graffenried	Switzerland	8	16	21	Q
7	Patrick Farrell	Canada	7	14	23	
8	Bo Lindman	Sweden	6	21	22	Q
9	Erik Kofoed-Hansen	Denmark	6	16	22	
10	Gerónimo Delgadillo	Mexico	4	16	27	
11	Imre Petneházy	Hungary	0	3	27	

==== Quarterfinal 3 ====
Rank	Fencer	Nation	Points	TS	TR	Notes
1	Max Janlet	Belgium	10	18	9	Q
2	Philippe Cattiau	France	10	18	14	Q
3	Giancarlo Cornaggia-Medici	Italy	9	18	12	Q
4	Gustave Heiss	United States	8	15	11	Q
5	Tibor Benkő	Hungary	6	12	14	Q
6	Stig Lindström	Sweden	5	14	19	Q
7	Eduardo Prieto Souza	Mexico	4	11	18	
7	Ernest Dalton	Canada	4	11	18	
—	Ivan Osiier	Denmark	DNS			

=== Semifinals ===
The top six finishers in each semifinal advanced to the final.

==== Semifinal 1 ====
Two bouts were not played: De Beukelaer-de Jong and Cattiau-Saucedo.

Both the Official Report and Sports-Reference credit De Beukelaer with 10 points; however, the head-to-head data shown by each has him winning 6 bouts and losing 2, which should result in 12 points.

Rank	Fencer	Nation	Points	TS	TR	Notes
1	Saverio Ragno	Italy	13	24	16	Q
2	Georges Buchard	France	12	20	16	Q
3	Sven Thofelt	Sweden	10	20	12	Q
4	Balthazar De Beukelaer	Belgium	10	21	14	Q
5	Philippe Cattiau	France	10	18	17	Q
6	Raúl Saucedo	Argentina	9	20	17	Q
7	Gustave Heiss	United States	8	20	19	
8	Eduardo Prieto	Mexico	4	15	22	
9	Doris de Jong	Netherlands	3	12	23	
10	Tibor Benkő	Hungary	3	12	26	

==== Semifinal 2 ====
Rank	Fencer	Nation	Points	TS	TR	Notes
1	Bernard Schmetz	France	14	22	13	Q
2	Giancarlo Cornaggia-Medici	Italy	12	22	17	Q
3	George Calnan	United States	11	24	17	Q
4	Paul de Graffenried	Switzerland	11	20	19	Q
5	Carlo Agostoni	Italy	10	20	14	Q
6	Stig Lindström	Sweden	10	22	17	Q
7	Max Janlet	Belgium	10	18	19	
8	André Poplimont	Belgium	6	13	21	
9	Bo Lindman	Sweden	4	15	24	
10	Aage Leidersdorff	Denmark	2	10	25	

=== Final ===
Rank	Fencer	Nation	Points	TS	TR
1st place, gold medalist(s)	Giancarlo Cornaggia-Medici	Italy	18	31	18
2nd place, silver medalist(s)	Georges Buchard	France	16	27	17
3rd place, bronze medalist(s)	Carlo Agostoni	Italy	15	30	17
4	Saverio Ragno	Italy	14	27	20
5	Bernard Schmetz	France	14	26	22
6	Philippe Cattiau	France	13	23	22
7	George Calnan	United States	13	22	22
8	Balthazar De Beukelaer	Belgium	8	19	25
9	Sven Thofelt	Sweden	8	21	27
10	Raúl Saucedo	Argentina	7	18	28
11	Paul de Graffenried	Switzerland	4	17	29
12	Stig Lindström	Sweden	4	15	29

== Results summary ==
Rank	Fencer	Nation	Quarterfinals		Semifinals		Final Points
Rank	Fencer	Nation	Points	Rank	Points	Rank	Final Points
1st place, gold medalist(s)	Giancarlo Cornaggia-Medici	Italy	9	3rd	12	2nd	18
2nd place, silver medalist(s)	Georges Buchard	France	12	2nd	12	2nd	16
3rd place, bronze medalist(s)	Carlo Agostoni	Italy	16	1st	10	5th	15
4	Saverio Ragno	Italy	16	1st	13	1st	14
5	Bernard Schmetz	France	15	2nd	14	1st	14
6	Philippe Cattiau	France	10	2nd	10	5th	13
7	George Calnan	United States	12	5th	11	3rd	13
8	Balthazar De Beukelaer	Belgium	10	3rd	10	4th	8
9	Sven Thofelt	Sweden	8	4th	10	3rd	8
10	Raúl Saucedo	Argentina	13	3rd	9	6th	7
11	Paul de Graffenried	Switzerland	8	6th	11	4th	4
12	Stig Lindström	Sweden	5	6th	10	6th	4
13	Max Janlet	Belgium	10	1st	10	7th	Did not advance
13	Gustave Heiss	United States	8	4th	8	7th	Did not advance
15	André Poplimont	Belgium	13	4th	6	8th	Did not advance
15	Eduardo Prieto	Mexico	7	6th	4	8th	Did not advance
17	Bo Lindman	Sweden	6	8th	4	9th	Did not advance
17	Doris de Jong	Netherlands	4	7th	3	9th	Did not advance
19	Tibor Benkő	Hungary	6	5th	3	10th	Did not advance
19	Aage Leidersdorff	Denmark	7	5th	2	10th	Did not advance
21	Patrick Farrell	Canada	7	7th	Did not advance		
21	Ernest Dalton	Canada	4	7th	Did not advance		
21	Eduardo Prieto Souza	Mexico	4	7th	Did not advance		
24	Bertram Markus	Canada	4	8th	Did not advance		
25	Erik Kofoed-Hansen	Denmark	6	9th	Did not advance		
25	Harold Corbin	United States	4	9th	Did not advance		
27	Gerónimo Delgadillo	Mexico	4	10th	Did not advance		
28	Imre Petneházy	Hungary	0	11th	Did not advance		
—	Erwin Casmir	Germany	DNS		Did not advance		
—	Ivan Osiier	Denmark	DNS		Did not advance		
—	Somfai	Hungary	DNS		Did not advance		
