= Cycling at the 1932 Summer Olympics – Men's team pursuit =

Cycling – Men's team pursuit at the Games of the X Olympiad
- Venue: Rose Bowl, Pasadena
- Dates: August 2
- Competitors: 20 (individuals), 5 (teams) from 5 nations

Medalists
1st place, gold medalist(s)		Marco Cimatti; Paolo Pedretti; Alberto Ghilardi; Nino Borsari; Italy
2nd place, silver medalist(s)		Amédée Fournier; René Le Grevès; Henri Mouillefarine; Paul Chocque; France
3rd place, bronze medalist(s)		Ernest Johnson; William Harvell; Frank Southall; Charles Holland; Great Britain

The men's team pursuit cycling event at the 1932 Olympic Games took place on August 2. The format was a 4000 metres pursuit.

== Results ==
The top four teams by time advanced to the semifinal.

=== Qualifying round ===
Qualifying

Rank	Name	Nationality	Time	Notes
1	Marco Cimatti; Paolo Pedretti; Alberto Ghilardi; Nino Borsari	Italy	4:52.9	OR
2	Amédée Fournier; René Le Grevès; Henri Mouillefarine; Paul Chocque	France	4:54.4	
3	Ernest Johnson; William Harvell; Frank Southall; Charles Holland	Great Britain	4:58.2	
4	Lew Rush; Glen Robbins; Russ Hunt; Frank Elliott	Canada	5:10.4	
5	Eddie Testa; Ruggero Berti; Harold Ade; Russell Allen	United States	5:17.4	

The winner of each of the two heats advanced to the final round.

=== Semifinal ===
Heat one

Rank	Name	Nationality	Time	Notes
1	Amédée Fournier; René Le Grevès; Henri Mouillefarine; Paul Chocque	France	4:53.9	
2	Ernest Johnson; William Harvell; Frank Southall; Charles Holland	Great Britain	4:57.4	

Heat two

Rank	Name	Nationality	Time	Notes
1	Marco Cimatti; Paolo Pedretti; Alberto Ghilardi; Nino Borsari	Italy	5:24.9	
2	Lew Rush; Glen Robbins; Russ Hunt; Frank Elliott	Canada	5:34.4	

=== Final ===
Match 1/2

Rank	Name	Nationality	Time	Notes
1st place, gold medalist(s)	Marco Cimatti; Paolo Pedretti; Alberto Ghilardi; Nino Borsari	Italy	4:53.0	
2nd place, silver medalist(s)	Amédée Fournier; René Le Grevès; Henri Mouillefarine; Paul Chocque	France	4:55.7	

Match 3/4

Rank	Name	Nationality	Time	Notes
3rd place, bronze medalist(s)	Ernest Johnson; William Harvell; Frank Southall; Charles Holland	Great Britain	4:56.0	
4	Lew Rush; Glen Robbins; Russ Hunt; Frank Elliott	Canada	6:04.0	

Key: OR = Olympic record
