= Ebon =

Ebon may refer to:

== Places ==
=== Marshall Islands ===
- The Marshallese language
- Short for the Ebon Atoll
  - Ebon, Marshall Islands, the largest city on Ebon Atoll
- Ebon Airport (IATA; EBO) at Ebon

=== Elsewhere ===
- Ebon, Kentucky
- Ebon Peak, a mountain on the border of Alberta and British Columbia, Canada
- Ebon Pond, a pond in the Brown Peninsula, Victoria Land, Antarctica

== People ==
=== Given name ===
- Ebon Andersson (1896–1969), Swedish politician and librarian
- Ebon C. Ingersoll (1831–1879), American politician
- Ebon Moss-Bachrach (born 1977), American actor
- Ebon Rinaldo Wigle (c. 1879–1941), Canadian politician

=== Surname ===
- Martin Ebon (1917–2006), German-born American journalist and author

=== Fictional characters ===
- Ebon, the alias of character Ivan Evans in Static Shock

== Fiction ==
- Ebon, a 2014 novel by Robin McKinley
- Ebon, a fictional planet in The Outer Limits episode "Nightmare"

== Other ==
- Made of ebony
- Black in color

== See also ==
- Ebontius, saint and Bishop of Barbastro
- E.Bon Holdings, a public group listed in the Hong Kong Stock Exchange Limited
- Ebone (disambiguation)
- Ebony (disambiguation)
