= Dyrssen =

Dyrssen is a Swedish surname that may refer to

- Gustaf Dyrssen (1891–1981), Swedish army officer and modern pentathlete
- Helena Dyrssen (born 1959), Swedish jurist and politician
- Lizinka Dyrssen (1866–1952), Swedish women's rights activist
- Wilhelm Dyrssen (1858–1929), Swedish admiral

== See also ==
- Duerson, a similar surname of German origin
