= Belgium at the 1932 Summer Olympics =

- IOC code: BEL
- NOC: Belgian Olympic Committee

in Los Angeles
- Competitors: 36 in 2 sports
- Medals: Gold 0 Silver 0 Bronze 1 Total 1

Summer Olympics appearances (overview)
- 1900; 1904; 1908; 1912; 1920; 1924; 1928; 1932; 1936; 1948; 1952; 1956; 1960; 1964; 1968; 1972; 1976; 1980; 1984; 1988; 1992; 1996; 2000; 2004; 2008; 2012; 2016; 2020; 2024

Other related appearances
- 1906 Intercalated Games

Belgium competed at the 1932 Summer Olympics in Los Angeles, United States. 36 competitors, 29 men and 7 women, took part in 10 events in 2 sports.

== Fencing ==
Seven fencers, six men and a woman, represented Austria in 1932.

Men's foil

- Georges de Bourguignon
- Werner Mund

Men's épée

- Balthazar De Beukelaer
- Max Janlet
- André Poplimont

Men's team épée

- André Poplimont, Max Janlet, Balthazar De Beukelaer, Werner Mund, Raoul Henkart

Men's sabre

- Georges de Bourguignon

Women's foil

- Jenny Addams
