= Harold Ade =

American cyclist

Personal information
- Full name: William Harold Ade
- Born: March 22, 1912 La Mesa, California, U.S.
- Died: June 19, 1988 (aged 76) Oak Park Township, Illinois, U.S.

Cycling career
- Sport: Cycling

William Harold Ade (March 22, 1912 – June 19, 1988) was an American cyclist who competed in the 1932 Summer Olympics.

Harold was an athlete on the Olympic Cycling 4000m Team Pursuit, and was joined by Ruggero Berti, also from the East Coast, as well as Eddie Testa and Russell Allen from California. The four members had only two weeks of daily training to prepare together for the 1932 Summer Games and continued training as the events commenced.

After his athletics career, Ade became a firefighter and was later appointed the deputy chief of the Oak Park Township, Illinois fire department.
