= Magnus Dyrssen =

Swedish Army officer

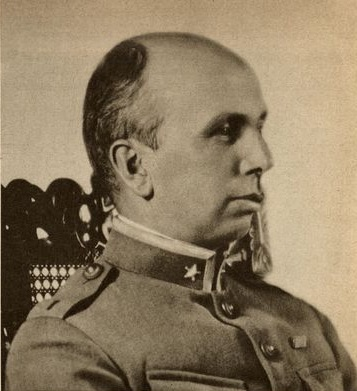
- Dyrssen as major (1936–38).
- Born: Magnus Peder Wilhelm Dyrssen; 18 May 1894; Karlskrona, Sweden
- Died: 1 March 1940 (aged 45); Märkäjärvi, Salla, Finland
- Relatives: Wilhelm Dyrssen (father); Lizinka af Uggla (mother); Gustaf Dyrssen (brother)
- Military career
- Allegiance: Sweden
- Branch: Swedish Army
- Service years: 1915–1940
- Rank: Lieutenant colonel
- Unit: Swedish Volunteer Corps (1940)
- Conflicts: Winter War; Battle of Salla

Lieutenant Colonel Magnus Peder Wilhelm Dyrssen (18 May 1894 – 1 March 1940) was a Swedish Army officer. Dyrssen is best known as one of the initiators of the Swedish Volunteer Corps during the Winter War in Finland where he was killed in action.

== Early life ==
Dyrssen was born on 18 May 1894 in Karlskrona, the son of Admiral Wilhelm Dyrssen and baroness Lizinka af Uggla. His brother was Lieutenant General Gustaf Dyrssen.

== Career ==
Dyrssen was appointed underlöjtnant in Svea Artillery Regiment in 1915. After graduating from the military academy and officer candidate service, he became a captain in the General Staff in 1926 and served for six years as an ADC to the Chief of the General Staff, Major General Carl Gustaf Hammarskjöld (1926–1930) and Major General Bo Boustedt (1930–1932). In 1932 he returned to his regiment as artillery battery commander. Dyrssen became a teacher in Sweden's strategic conditions at Royal Swedish Army Staff College in 1935, and was appointed major in 1936 and lieutenant colonel in 1938. He was briefly acting head of Royal Swedish Army Staff College in 1939. Dyrssen was chairman of the executive committee of the Swedish Military Sports Association (Sveriges militära idrottsförbund) from 1937 to 1939.

Dyrssen studied Finland's defense capabilities in detail and made trips and long ski trips in the Finnish border areas with Russia. In his teaching as a teacher at the Royal Swedish Army Staff College, he emphasized the cohesion of Sweden and Finland in military policy terms. He undoubtedly drew the logical consequence of his view of the affiliation of these two countries when the harbingers of the Winter War began to be discerned in the autumn of 1939. In speech and writing, he worked for Swedish support for Finland. He was one of the initiators of the Swedish Volunteer Corps and traveled before Christmas with the first Swedish officers to Tornio to lead the organizational work of the corps with the first arrived contingents as commander. Under often unfavorable and exhausting conditions, he then finished organizing his unit as commander of the corps' first group and commanded it during a long and strenuous transfer to the battlefield at Märkäjärvi in Salla.

== Death ==
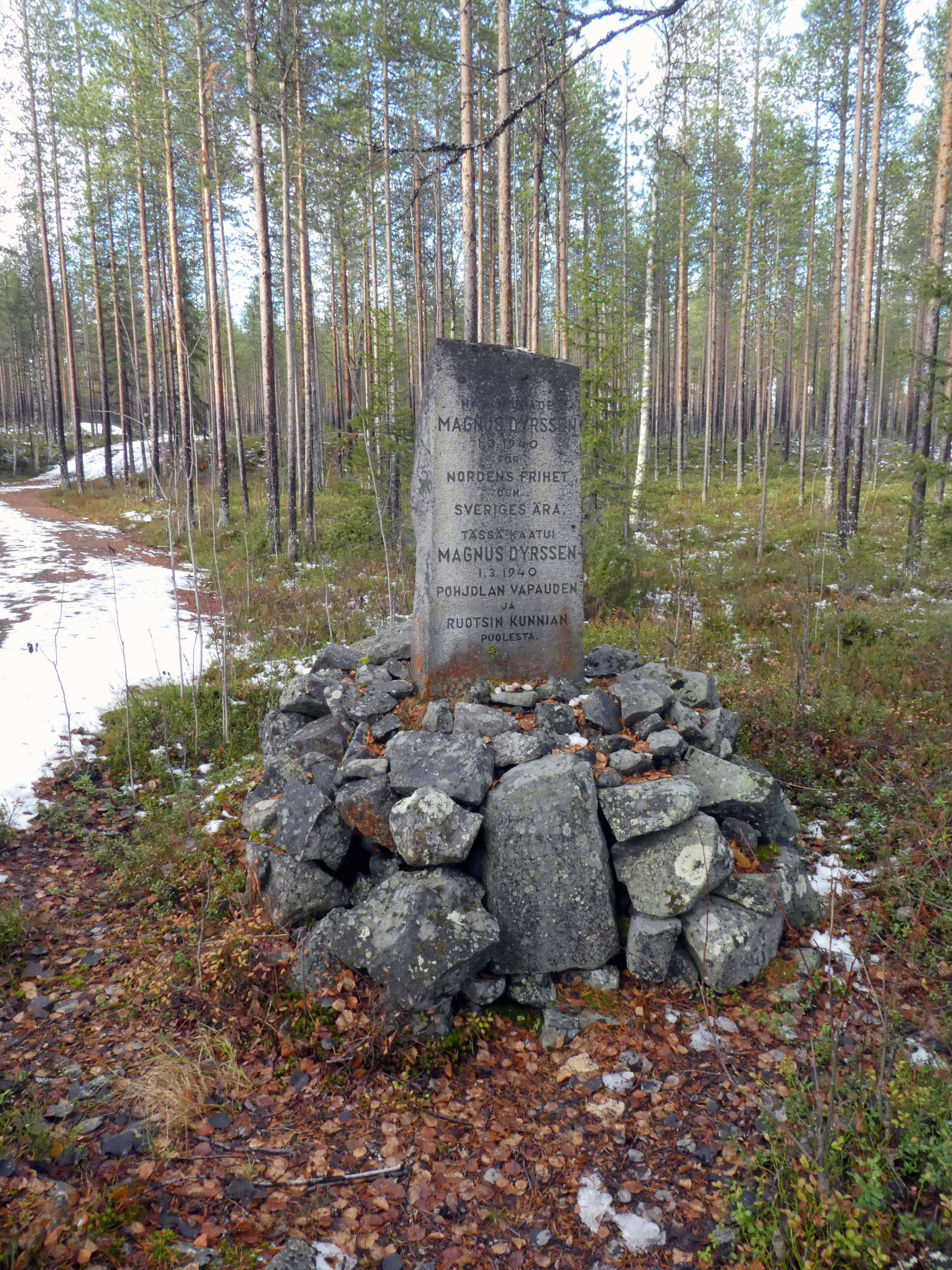
Memorial stone in Märkäjärvi, Finland.

After only a few days, on 1 March 1940, after the group's deployment into battle, he was killed after being hit by a shrapnel while inspecting a defensive position.

At the announcement of his death, Field Marshal Carl Gustaf Emil Mannerheim sent General Ernst Linder a telegram, in which it was stated: "Magnus Dyrssen's significant contribution to the formation of the corps, his outstanding officer qualities will always assure him one of the foremost places in the history of the Swedish Volunteer Corps. He is fondly remembered by the Finnish Army."

On 9 March 1940, Dyrssen was buried in Engelbrekt Church in Stockholm by Pastor Hans Åkerhielm of the Swedish Volunteer Corps. Crown Prince Gustaf Adolf spoke at the stretcher and laid a wreath from the king. The ceremony was attended by a large number of representatives of military and civilian authorities and official institutions, associations, etc. in Sweden and Finland. Members of the Swedish Volunteer Corps parade. The coffin was carried by majors and captains from the Svea Artillery Regiment.

He was buried the same day in the then Stockholms-Näs Cemetery (now Kungsängen Cemetery).

== Honours ==
- Member of the Royal Swedish Academy of War Sciences (1939)

== Dates of rank ==
- 1915 – Underlöjtnant
- 19?? – Lieutenant
- 1926 – Captain
- 1936 – Major
- 1938 – Lieutenant colonel
