= Russell Allen (cyclist) =

American cyclist

Personal information
- Full name: Russell D. Allen
- Nickname: Legs
- Born: March 10, 1913 Orwell, Ohio, U.S.
- Died: April 2, 2012 (aged 99)

Cycling career
- Sport: Cycling

Russell D. Allen (March 10, 1913 – April 2, 2012) was an American cyclist who competed at the 1932 Summer Olympics in Los Angeles. There he placed fifth in the Men's Team Pursuit, 4,000 metres event alongside teammates Eddie Testa, Ruggero Berti and Harold Ade. Born in Orwell, Ohio, his family moved around several times during his childhood, until they settled in California, where his father died. He was athletically active throughout school and took up an interest in cycling during his junior year of high school. After competing at the 1932 Olympics, he raced professionally until World War II. Allen served as an officer and teacher during the war and found work as an automobile salesman afterwards. He also volunteered at the 1984 Summer Olympics and remained athletically active into his 90s. From 2006 until his death he was the oldest living American Olympic cyclist.

== Early life ==
Allen was born in Orwell, Ohio, the son of a baker. At the age of four he moved to Detroit, Michigan, where his father worked as an electrician until World War I. During the war, Allen's father re-enlisted in the United States Navy and, after the conflict, moved the family to Fort Worth, Texas to work at the automobile manufacturing plant for the Texas Star. When the company folded two years later they moved again, this time to Huntington Park, California, in the home state of his mother. He was the middle child of three siblings; his brother was born in Detroit and his sister in California. His father died early of alcoholism, leaving the mother to raise the family.

During his school days, Allen participated in track and field and baseball before becoming interested in cycling during his third year of high school. As a freshman in high school he met future three-time American Olympian Frank Wykoff. He began training with the Crebs Cycling Club of Long Beach, California and Eddie Testa, who would later be chosen as one of his three partners for the Men's Team Pursuit, 4,000 metres event at the 1932 Summer Olympics. He quickly earned the nickname "Legs" while working out with the club.

== Cycling career ==
After the Olympic trials, Allen was joined by Testa and two riders from the East Coast, Ruggero Berti and Harold Ade. The four members had only two weeks of daily training to prepare together for the 1932 Summer Games and continued training as the events commenced. When not competing, Allen had the opportunity to meet Olympic champions such as Duke Kahanamoku, Paavo Nurmi and Jim Thorpe. The four Americans, who represented the first Olympic track cycling team for their country, ended up placing fifth in the Men's Team Pursuit, 4,000 metres event.

After the Olympics, Allen began to cycle professionally and received contracts to race both nationally and internationally, which disqualified him from future Olympic Games. He soon became heavily involved in American six-day racing, riding in a total of thirty. When cycling, he used bicycles manufactured by the Schwinn Bicycle Company. He competed until 1940, when World War II broke out.

== Later life ==
Allen worked at a defense job for the first half of the war, before joining the Navy in 1943. He traveled to United States Naval Training Center Bainbridge, Maryland to attend Gene Tunney's school of athletics, and graduated as a Petty Officer Second Class. For the remainder of the war he taught naval air gunners swimming in Miami, Florida before moving to Corpus Christi, Texas to teach survival at Naval Air Station Corpus Christi.

He married his wife Rose, a graduate of the University of California, Los Angeles, in the early 1940s and had three children: two girls and a boy. All of his children were UCLA graduates and his son became a family practitioner. After the war, Allen worked as an automobile salesman for Chevrolet and Cadillac until his 1962 retirement, at which point he took up golfing. During the 1984 Summer Olympics, which were again held in Los Angeles, he worked with the Helms Athletic Foundation to take disadvantaged children to the events and give athletic talks to junior high school students. He also participated in that year's Olympic torch relay. He has also distributed medals at the annual Jesse Owens ARCO Games.

Widowed at the turn of the century, Allen remained athletically active, regularly participating in 50-60 mile rides into his 80s. In 2005 he participated in the Los Angeles Marathon bike ride. In 2006 he attended the funeral of John Sinibaldi, a teammate at the 1932 Summer Olympics. In his spare time, he enjoyed playing Texas hold 'em. Until at least 2006 he went bungee jumping yearly with his daughter in New Zealand and, in January of that year, he spent three weeks traveling the Middle East. From Sinibaldi's death until his own he was the oldest living American Olympic cyclist.
