= Switzerland at the 1932 Summer Olympics =

- IOC code: SUI
- NOC: Swiss Olympic Association

in Los Angeles
- Competitors: 6 in 4 sports
- Flag bearer: Paul Martin
- Medals Ranked 22nd: Gold 0 Silver 1 Bronze 0 Total 1

Summer Olympics appearances (overview)
- 1896; 1900; 1904; 1908; 1912; 1920; 1924; 1928; 1932; 1936; 1948; 1952; 1956; 1960; 1964; 1968; 1972; 1976; 1980; 1984; 1988; 1992; 1996; 2000; 2004; 2008; 2012; 2016; 2020; 2024

Other related appearances
- 1906 Intercalated Games

Switzerland competed at the 1932 Summer Olympics in Los Angeles, United States. Six competitors, all men, took part in eight events in four sports.

== Medalists ==
Medal	Name	Sport	Event	Date
Silver	Georges Miez	Gymnastics	Men's floor	August 8

== Fencing ==
One male fencer represented Switzerland in 1932.

Men's foil

- Paul de Graffenried

Men's épée

- Paul de Graffenried
