= Henri Mouillefarine =

French cyclist

Personal information
- Born: 1 August 1910 Montrouge, France
- Died: 21 July 1994 (aged 83) Clamart, France

Cycling career
- Sport: Cycling
Medal record
Representing FRA
Men's cycling
Olympic Games
Silver medal – second place	1932 Los Angeles	team pursuit

Henri Mouillefarine (1 August 1910 – 21 July 1994) was a French cyclist who competed in the 1932 Summer Olympics. He won a silver medal in the team pursuit event.
