= Alexandra Skoglund =

Swedish suffragette, women's rights activist and politician

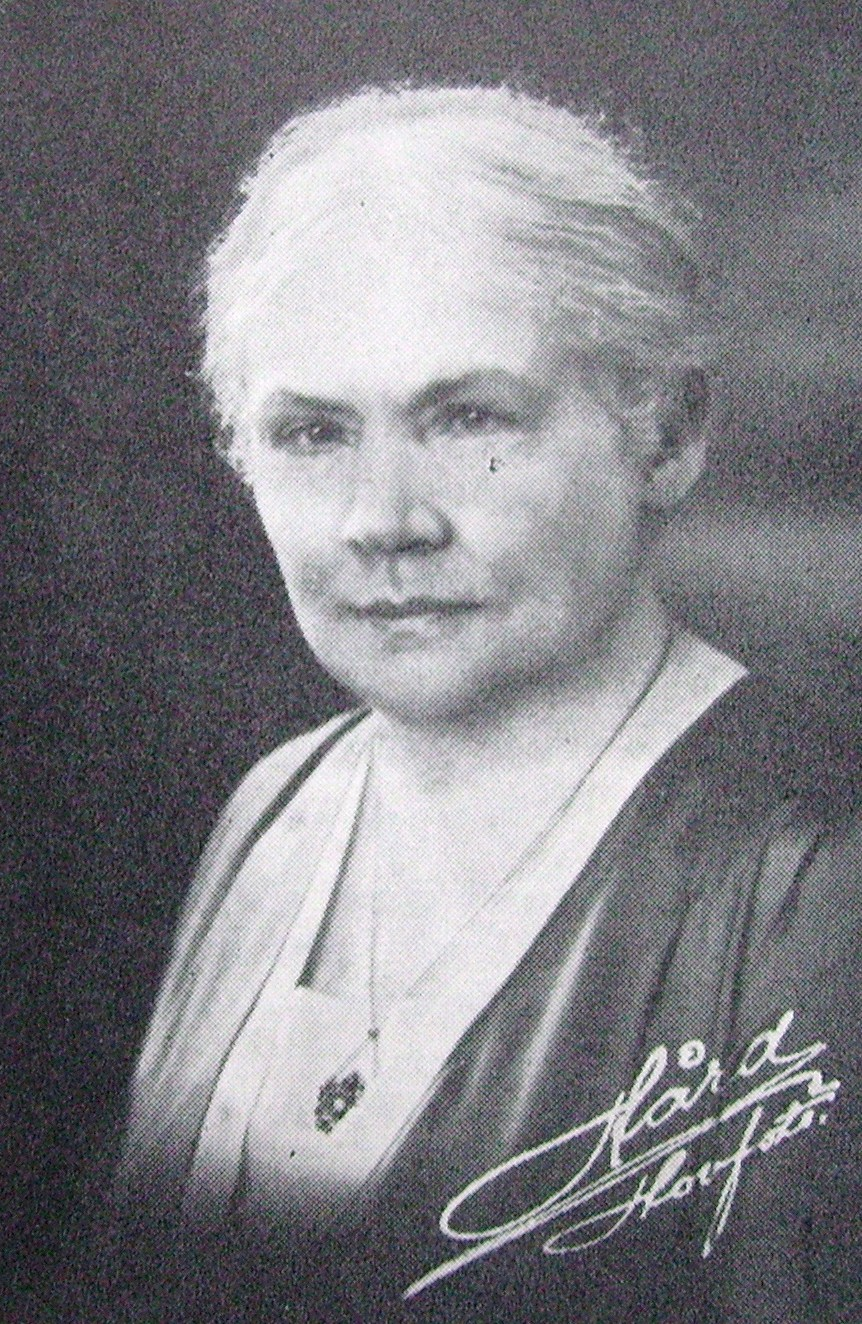
Alexandra Skoglund.

Louise Sophie Alexandra Skoglund (1862–1938) was a Swedish suffragette, women's rights activist and politician.

Skoglund was born 22 October 1862 in Stockholm, Sweden. Skoglund graduated from Högre lärarinneseminariet in 1883. She was a teacher at the Åhlinska skolan in 1912–1933.

In 1902–1903, she was one of the founders of the National Association for Women's Suffrage. After the Country Association for Women's Suffrage had abandoned its political neutrality in 1911, when the conservative Moderate Party was the only party left opposed to women suffrage, Alexandra Skoglund was one of the right wing suffragists to create the Moderate Association for Women's Suffrage. She was the chairperson in the Moderate women of the Moderate Party in 1920–1938.

Skoglund died 12 February 1938 in Stockholm.

== Sources ==
- Walborg Hedberg – Louise Arosenius: Svenska kvinnor från skilda verksamhetsområden, Stockholm 1914, sid. 93.
- Ann-Cathrine Haglund, Ann-Marie Petersson, Inger Ström-Billing, red (2004). Moderata pionjärer: kvinnor i politiskt arbete 1900–2000. Stockholm: Sällskapet för moderata kvinnors historia. Libris 9666368. ISBN 91-631-5862-0 (inb.) Pionjären Alexandra Skoglund, 1862–1938 av Inger Ström-Billing
- L S Alexandra Skoglund, urn:sbl:6020, Svenskt biografiskt lexikon (art av Inger Ström-Billing), hämtad 2014-02-11.
