= Norrland Artillery Regiment =

Coordinates: 63°10′34″N 14°38′52″E

- Norrlands artilleriregemente
- Active: 1893–1983, 1990–1997
- Country: Sweden
- Allegiance: Swedish Armed Forces
- Branch: Swedish Army
- Type: Artillery
- Size: Regiment
- Part of: 6th Army Division (1893–1901); VI Army Division (1902–1927); Northern Army Division (1928–1936); II Army Division (1937–1942); II Military District (1942–1966); Milo NN (1966–1983); Östersund Army Garrison (1983–1990); Milo NN (1990–1993); Milo N (1993–1997)
- Garrison/HQ: Östersund
- Mottos: Framåtanda, fältmässighet, sammanhållning ("Spirit, serviceability, unity")
- Colors: Orange
- March: "Norrlands artilleriregementes marsch" (Hyltén) (Note: The march was established in 1953 by Army Order 33/1953.)
- Anniversaries: 28 September; 4 December (Note: 4 December is saint day of Saint Barbara.)

Insignia
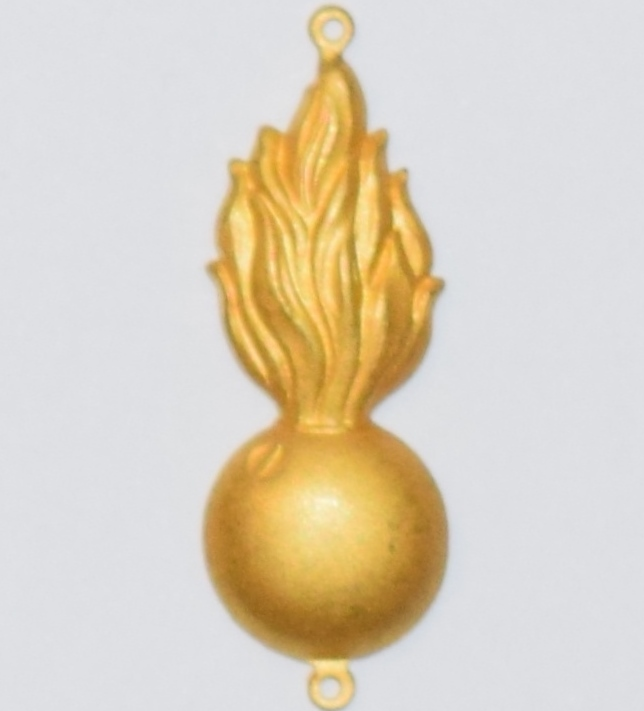
- Branch insignia

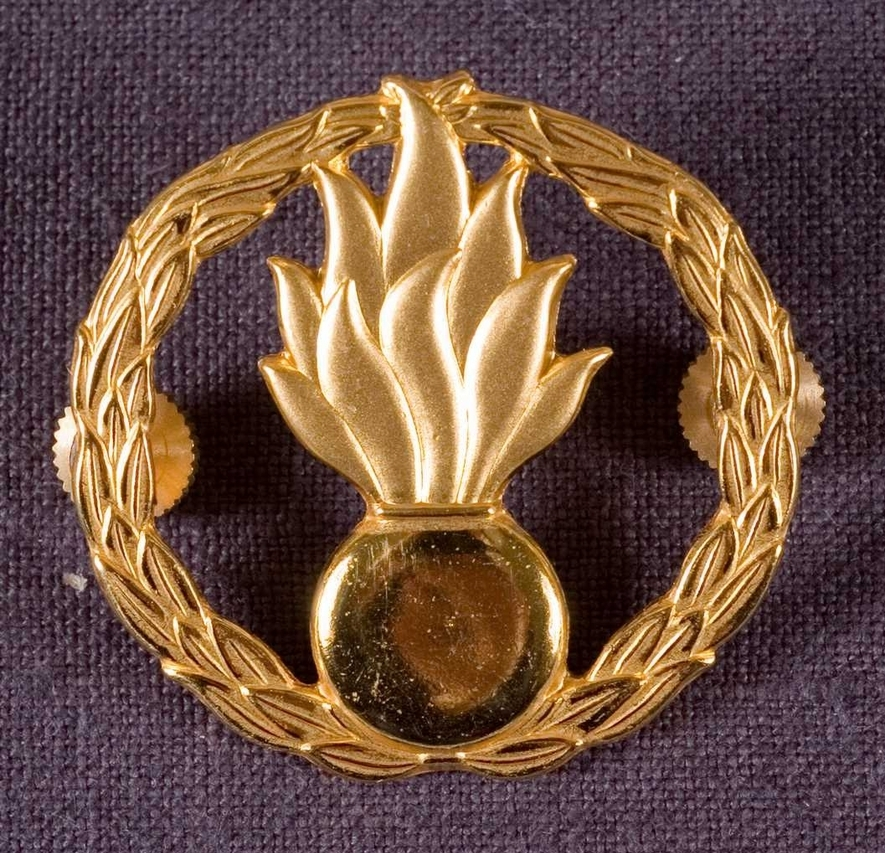
- Cap badge

The Norrland Artillery Regiment (Swedish: Norrlands artilleriregemente), designation A 4, was a Swedish Army artillery regiment that traced its origins back to the 19th century. The regiment's soldiers were originally recruited from the provinces of Norrland. The regiment was disbanded in 1997. From 1998 to 2000, the Boden Artillery Regiment was known by this name.

== History ==
The regiment was created in 1893 by splitting off two batteries from 1st Svea Artillery Regiment and two batteries from 1st Göta Artillery Regiment which formed six batteries of Norrland Artillery Regiment. The regiment was garrisoned in Östersund but a detachment in Boden was created in 1910, this detachment was split off in 1928 and created Norrbotten Artillery Corps. The regiment's designation was A 4 (4th Artillery Regiment). Norrland Artillery Regiment was disbanded in 1997.

== Campaigns ==
- None

== Organisation ==
- Unknown

== Heraldry and traditions ==
=== Colours, standards and guidons ===
The regimental standard was presented by His Majesty the King Gustaf V on his birthday on 16 June 1938.

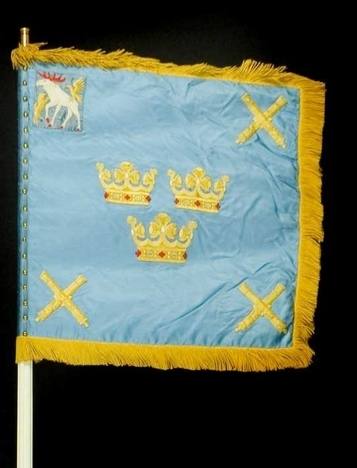
The 1938 guard standard.

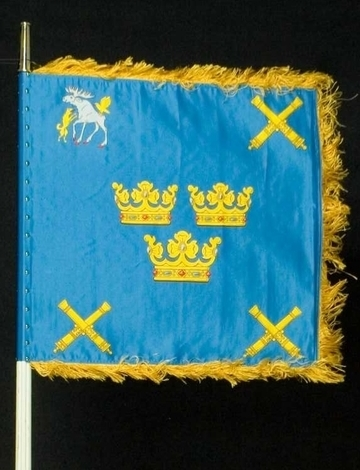
The 1986 guard standard which replaced the one from 1938.

=== Coat of arms ===
The coat of the arms of the Norrland Artillery Regiment (A 1) 1977–1997. Blazon: "Azure, the provincial badge of Jämtland, an elk passant argent, attacked on the back by a rising falcon and in the front by a rampant dog both or; all animals armed and langued gules. The shield surmounted two gunbarrels of older pattern in saltire or. The gunbarrels may be sable".

=== Medals ===
In 1997, the Norrlands artilleriregementes (A 4) minnesmedalj ("Norrland Artillery Regiment (A 4) Commemorative Medal") in silver (NorrlartregSMM) of the 8th size was established. The medal ribbon is orange moiré with two red lines on each side.

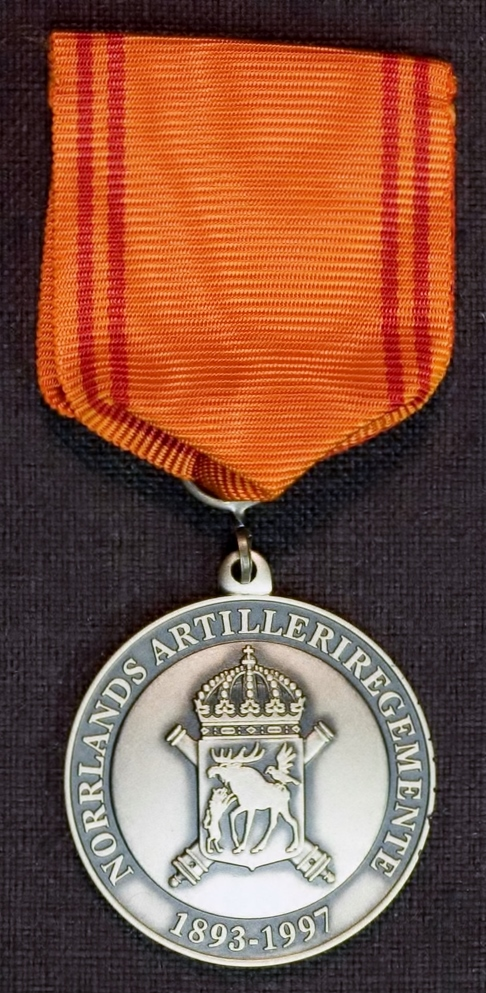
Norrland Artillery Regiment (A 4) Commemorative Medal.

=== Heritage ===
Upon the disbandment of the regiment, the regimental traditions, standards and names was taken over by Boden Artillery Regiment. On 30 June 2000, the Boden Artillery Regiment, or Norrland Artillery Regiment which it was called then, was disbanded. From 1 July 2000, the standard and its traditions was passed on to the Artillery Regiment.

== Commanding officers ==
Regimental commander from 1893 to 1997.

- 1893–1898: Colonel Ernst Boheman
- 1898–1907: Colonel Herman Birger Holmberg
- 1907–1913: Colonel Olof Erland Hofstedt
- 1913–1916: Colonel Arvid Edmund Rudling
- 1916–1922: Colonel Hugo Nordenfelt
- 1922–1927: Colonel Johan Georg Sylvan
- 1927–1934: Colonel Georg Ohlson
- 1934–1939: Colonel Per Falk
- 1939–1942: Colonel Carl-Gustaf Hamilton
- 1942–1943: Colonel Carl Årmann
- 1943–1947: Colonel Fernando Odenrick
- 1947–1952: Colonel Thorsten Berggren
- 1952–1959: Colonel Stig Lindström
- 1959–1965: Colonel Göran Schildt
- 1965–1975: Colonel Lennart Brant-Lundin
- 1975–1979: Colonel Sven Ragnar Eugén Holmberg
- 1979–1982: Colonel Thure Östberg
- 1982–1985: Colonel Lars-Olof Strandberg
- 1985–1987: Colonel Dan Albin Snell
- 1987–1992: Colonel Sten Sture Gustaf Ankarcrona
- 1992–1994: Colonel Lennart Uller
- 1994–1996: Colonel Lars Lagrell
- 1996–1997: Colonel Torsten Gerhardsson
- 1997–1997: Lieutenant Colonel Sten Bredberg (Note: Bredberg was acting regimental commander from 1 October to 31 December 1997.)

== Names, designations and locations ==
Name	Translation	From		To
Kungl. Norrlands artilleriregemente	Royal Norrland Artillery Regiment	1893-10-01	–	1974-12-31
Norrlands artilleriregemente	Norrland Artillery Regiment	1975-01-01	–	1983-06-30
Norrlands artilleriregemente	Norrland Artillery Regiment	1990-07-01	–	1997-12-31
Designation		From		To
No. 4		1893-10-01	–	1914-09-30
A 4		1914-10-01	–	1983-06-30
A 4		1990-07-01	–	1997-12-31
Location		From		To
Östersund Garrison		1893-10-01	–	1983-06-30
Östersund Garrison		1990-07-01	–	1997-12-31

== See also ==
- List of Swedish artillery regiments
