= Paolo Pedretti =

Italian cyclist (1906–1983)

Personal information
- Born: 22 January 1906 Orsenigo, Italy
- Died: 22 February 1983 (aged 77) Tavernerio, Italy

Cycling career
- Sport: Cycling
Medal record
Representing Italy
Men's cycling
Olympic Games
Gold medal – first place	1932 Los Angeles	Team pursuit

Paolo Pedretti (22 January 1906 – 22 February 1983) was an Italian cyclist who competed in the 1932 Summer Olympics. He won the gold medal in the team pursuit event.
