= Gunnar af Klintberg =

Swedish Army officer

- Born: Carl Gunnar Ferdinand af Klintberg; 4 December 1902; Skövde, Sweden
- Died: 9 October 1983 (aged 80)
- Military career
- Allegiance: Sweden
- Branch: Swedish Army
- Service years: 1924–1963
- Rank: Major General
- Commands: Svea Artillery Regiment; Royal Swedish Army Staff College; Inspector, Army Signal Troops
- Conflicts: Congo Crisis

Major General Carl Gunnar Ferdinand af Klintberg (4 December 1902 – 9 October 1983) was a Swedish Army officer. His senior commands include commanding officer of Svea Artillery Regiment, the Royal Swedish Army Staff College as well Deputy Force Commander of the United Nations Operation in the Congo (ONUC). af Klintberg also served as the Inspector, Army Signal Troops.

== Early life ==
af Klintberg was born on 4 December 1902 in Skövde, Sweden, the son of captain Carl af Klintberg and Märta (née Westerberg). He passed studentexamen on 11 May 1921.

== Career ==
af Klintberg was commissioned as an officer on 31 December 1923 and was assigned as a second lieutenant to the reserve of the Svea Artillery Regiment (A 1). af Klintberg was commissioned as an officer when he passed his exam on 18 December 1924 and was then appointed second lieutenant in Svea Artillery Regiment on 13 February 1925 and underlöjtnant there on 31 December 1925. He passed the general course of the Artillery and Engineering College in 1928 and became lieutenant in the regiment on 18 July 1928.

af Klintberg was educated at the Royal Swedish Army Staff College from 1930 to 1932. He became captain of the General Staff in 1936 and served in Svea Artillery Regiment in 1941. He became major of the General Staff in 1942 and was chief of staff of the IV Military Commanding Staff from 1942 to 1946. He was promoted to lieutenant colonel in 1945 and served again in Svea Artillery Regiment in 1946. af Klintberg was promoted to colonel in 1949 and was head of the Recruiting and Replacement Office (Centrala värnpliktsbyrån) from 1949 to 1953. He served as regimental commander of Svea Artillery Regiment from 1953 to 1955 and commanding officer of the Royal Swedish Army Staff College from 1955 to 1959 as well as the Inspector, Army Signal Troops from 1959 to 1962. af Klintberg was promoted to major general in 1962 and was Deputy Force Commander of the United Nations Operation in the Congo (ONUC) from 1962 to 1963.

== Personal life ==
In 1935 he married his relative Gertrud af Klintberg (1913–2008), the daughter of lawyer Bengt af Klintberg and Greta von Unge. af Klintberg was the father of Ulf (born 1935), Louise (born 1938), Carl (born 1940), Mats (1942–2014), Ingrid (born 1944), Tord (born 1951) and Pål (1957–1966).

== Death ==
He died on 9 October 1983 and was buried on 15 June 1984 at the Old Cemetery in Grödinge, Botkyrka Municipality.

== Dates of rank ==
- 13 February 1925 – Second lieutenant
- 31 December 1925 – Underlöjtnant
- 18 July 1928 – Lieutenant
- 1936 – Captain
- 1942 – Major
- 1945 – Lieutenant colonel
- 1949 – Colonel
- 1962 – Major general

== Awards and decorations ==
- (Sweden) King Gustaf V's Jubilee Commemorative Medal (1948)
- (Sweden) Commander 1st Class of the Order of the Sword (6 June 1957)
- (Sweden) Knight of the Order of the Polar Star
- (Sweden) Knight of the Order of Vasa
- (Norway) Commander of the Order of St. Olav (1 July 1953)

== Honours ==
- Member of the Royal Swedish Academy of War Sciences (1955)

Military offices
Preceded by Hadar Cars	Royal Swedish Army Staff College; 1955–1959	Succeeded by Erik Rosengren
Preceded by Fale Burman	Inspector, Army Signal Troops; 1959–1962	Succeeded by Bengt Uller
