= Moderate Women =

- Moderatekvinnorna
- Formation: 1912–
- Type: women's wing
- Headquarters: Stockholm, Sweden
- Official language: Swedish
- Affiliations: Moderate Party

The Moderate Women (Swedish: Moderatkvinnorna [mʊdɛˈrɑ̂ːtˌkvɪnːʊɳa]) is the women's wing of the Swedish Moderate Party. It was established in 1912, since women had been allowing voting rights in municipal elections in 1910.

== History ==
When women were given municipal suffrage in 1910 and the first Moderate woman had been elected in to a municipal council (Valfrid Palmgren), the Moderate Party allowed the foundation for women's group within the party for the first time. The first woman's group was the local Stockholms Moderata Kvinnoförbund ("Moderate Women's League of Stockholm"), which was founded in 1912 by Lizinka Dyrssen, Louise Stenbock and Cecilia Milow under the leadership of Ebba von Eckerman. The Stockholms Moderata Kvinnoförbund was transformed in to the Sveriges moderata kvinnoförbund (SMKF) ("Moderate Women's League of Sweden") in 1915.

It existed in parallel with the Högerns Centrala Kvinnoråd ("The Central Women's Advisory Committee of the Right"), founded under the leadership of Alexandra Skoglund in 1920. Between 1920 and 1937, two separate independent women's wings existed.

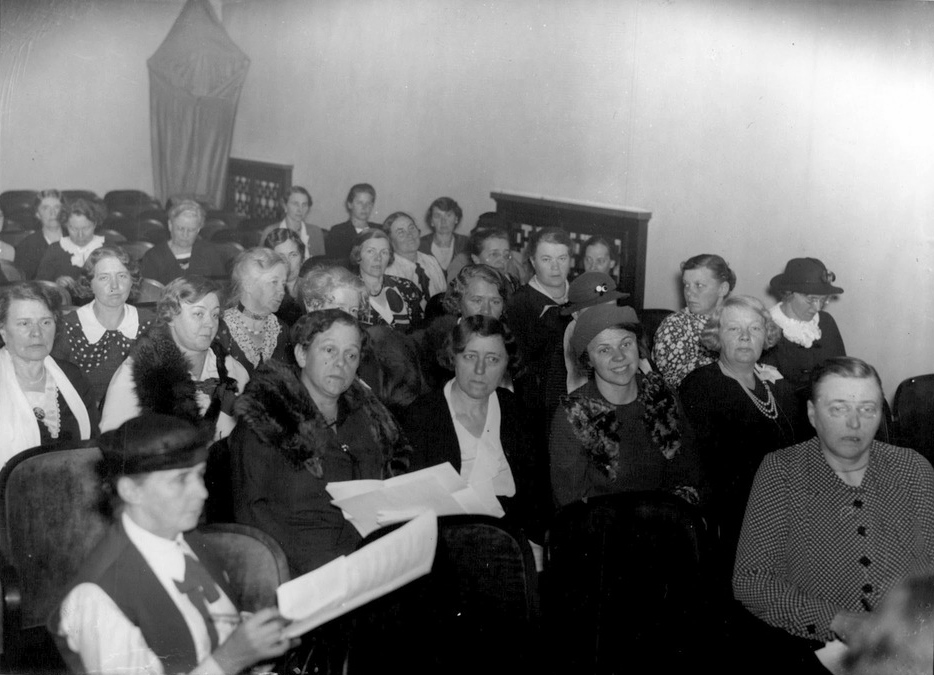
Moderate Women Council meeting in 1935

In 1937, the two women's wings Sveriges moderata kvinnoförbund (SMKF) and Högerns Centrala Kvinnoråd were both united to form a single women's wing, later known as Moderate Women, under the leadership of Alexandra Skoglund, formerly chairperson of the Högerns Centrala Kvinnoråd.

== Chairpersons ==
- Alexandra Skoglund, 1937–1938
- Ebon Andersson, 1938–1958
- Karin Wetterström, 1958–1965
- Ethel Florén-Winther, 1965–1972
- Britt Mogård, 1972–1981
- Ann-Cathrine Haglund, 1981–1990
- Gullan Lindblad, 1990–1997
- Beatrice Ask, 1997–2001
- Catharina Elmsäter-Svärd, 2001–2005
- Magdalena Andersson, 2005–2011
- Saila Quicklund, 2011–2015
- Annicka Engblom, 2015–2016
- Maria Rydén, tf, 2016–2017
- Ulrica Schenström, 2017–2019
- Josefin Malmqvist, 2019–
