= Alberto Ghilardi =

Italian cyclist (1909–1971)

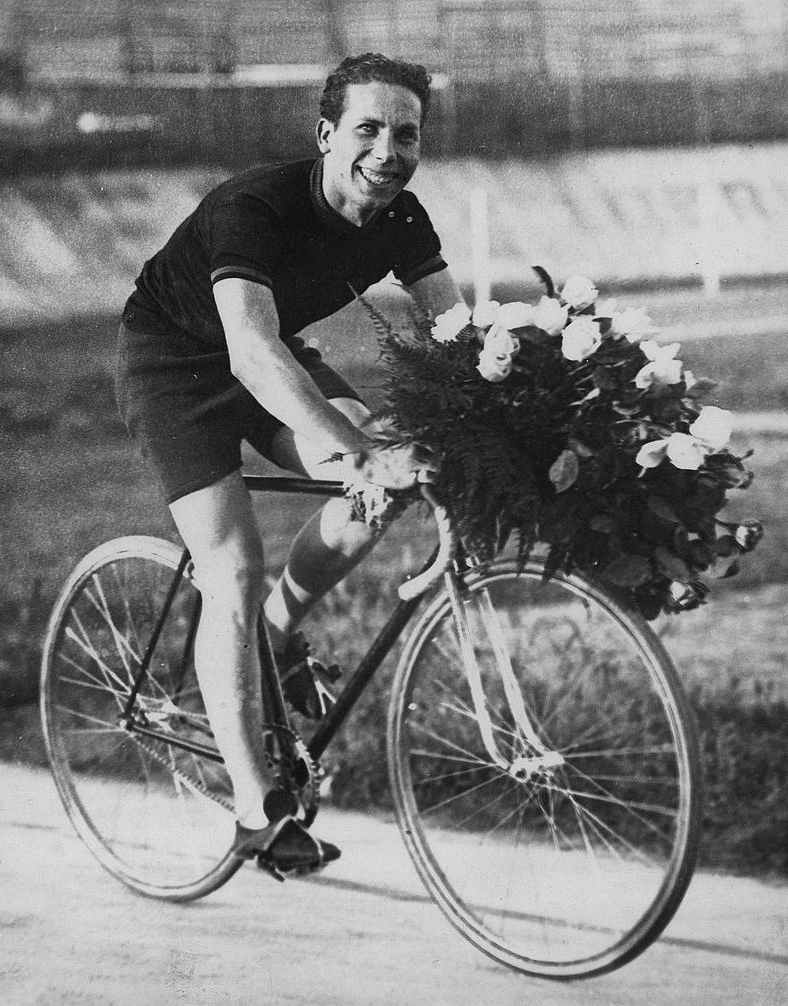
- Ghilardi in 1930

Personal information
- Born: 25 August 1909 Rome, Italy
- Died: 30 June 1971 (aged 61) Rome, Italy

Cycling career
- Sport: Cycling
Medal record
Men's cycling
Representing Italy
Olympic Games
Gold medal – first place	1932 Los Angeles	Team pursuit

Alberto Ghilardi (25 August 1909 – 30 June 1971) was an Italian cyclist who competed in the 1932 Summer Olympics. He won the gold medal in the team pursuit event.

Ghilardi started as a road racer and then changed to track. After the Olympics, he turned professional, but had little success and retired in 1936. After World War II he co-founded the Italian Federation of Athletes.
