= Duerson =

Name list

Duerson is a surname of German origin that has also been used as a given name. Notable people with the name include:

- Dave Duerson (1960–2011), American football player
- Duerson Knight (1893–1983), American fighter pilot

== Fictional characters ==
- Paul Duerson, character in the 2025 film Borderline

== See also ==
- Dyrssen, a similar surname of Swedish origin
