= Eduardo Prieto Souza =

Mexican fencer

Personal information
- Born: 6 February 1882 Zacatecas, Zacatecas, Mexico
- Died: 13 March 1963 (aged 81)

Sport
- Sport: Fencing

Eduardo Prieto Souza (6 February 1882 – 13 March 1963) was a Mexican fencer. He competed in the individual and team épée events at the 1932 Summer Olympics.
