= Russ Hunt (cyclist) =

Canadian cyclist

Personal information
- Born: 21 March 1911 Toronto, Canada
- Died: 30 September 1992 (aged 81)

Cycling career
- Sport: Cycling

Russ Hunt (21 March 1911 – 30 September 1992) was a Canadian cyclist. He competed in the team pursuit event at the 1932 Summer Olympics.
