= Ebon, Kentucky =

Unincorporated community in Kentucky, United States

- Unincorporated community
- Location within Kentucky Location within the United States
- Coordinates: 37°57′19″N 83°26′04″W
- Country: United States
- State: Kentucky
- County: Morgan
- Elevation: 1,037 ft (316 m)
- Time zone: UTC-5 (Eastern (EST))
  - Summer (DST): UTC-4 (EDT)
- Area code: 606
- GNIS feature ID: 512008

Ebon is an unincorporated community in Morgan County, Kentucky, United States.
