= Ernie Gates =

Canadian cyclist

Personal information
- Born: March 3, 1909 Brighton, England
- Died: September 23, 1973 (aged 64)

Cycling career
- Sport: Cycling

Ernie Gates (March 3, 1909 – September 23, 1973) was a Canadian cyclist. He competed in the individual and team road race events at the 1932 Summer Olympics.
