= George Burrows (swimmer) =

Canadian swimmer

Personal information
- Full name: George Alexander Burrows
- Born: 9 October 1910 Vancouver, British Columbia, Canada
- Died: 8 July 1987 (aged 76) Vancouver, British Columbia, Canada

Sport
- Sport: Swimming

George Alexander Burrows (9 October 1910 – 8 July 1987) was a Canadian swimmer. He competed in three events at the 1932 Summer Olympics.
