= Lizinka Dyrssen =

Swedish women's rights activist

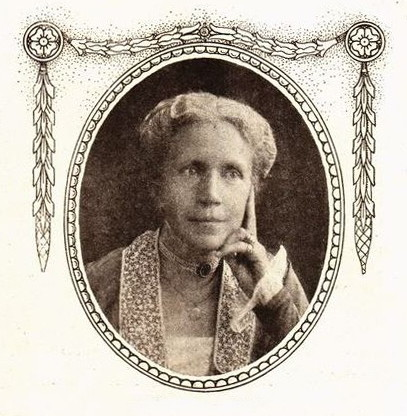
- Born: 28 July 1866; Uppsala-Näs, Sweden
- Died: 9 September 1952 (aged 64); Stockholm, Sweden
- Spouse: Wilhelm Dyrssen (m. 1888)
- Children: Gustaf Dyrssen; Magnus Dyrssen

Charlotta Maria Thérèse Lizinka Dyrssen, née af Ugglas (28 July 1866 – 9 September 1952), was a Swedish women's rights activist. She served as chairperson of the Swedish Red Cross 1902–1906, the Stockholm branch of the National Association for Women's Suffrage in 1909–1910, the Moderate Association for Women's Suffrage in 1917–1921, the Fredrika Bremer Association in 1921–1937, and the Moderate Women.

Dyrssen was born to Baron Gustaf af Ugglas and Thérèse Björnstjerna, and married Admiral and Naval Minister Wilhelm Dyrssen (1858–1929) in 1888. She was mother to Gustaf Dyrssen (1891–1981) and Magnus Dyrssen (1894–1940). She died on 9 September 1952 in Stockholm.

She was awarded the Illis quorum, medals from the German, Austrian, and Polish Red Cross organizations, the Finnish Cross of Liberty, fourth class; and the Swedish volunteer health service.

== Sources ==
- Wallberg, Evabritta, ed. (2005). Unionsåret 1905 – dramatik och vardag: två brevväxlingar : Wilhelm och Lizinka Dyrssen, Joachim och Martina Åkerman. Handlingar / Kungl. Samfundet för utgivande av handskrifter rörande Skandinaviens historia, 0347-8505; 28 (in Swedish). Stockholm: Kungl. Samfundet för utgivande av handskrifter rörande Skandinaviens historia. ISBN 91-85104-32-9.
