= Tibor Benkő =

Hungarian fencer and modern pentathlete

Personal information
- Born: 28 April 1905 Sepsiszentgyörgy, Kingdom of Hungary
- Died: 12 April 1988 (aged 82) Gödöllő, Hungary

Sport
- Sport: Fencing, Modern pentathlon

Tibor Benkő (28 April 1905 – 12 April 1988) was a Hungarian fencer and modern pentathlete. He competed at the 1932 Summer Olympics.
