= Ebon Andersson =

Swedish politician (1896–1969)

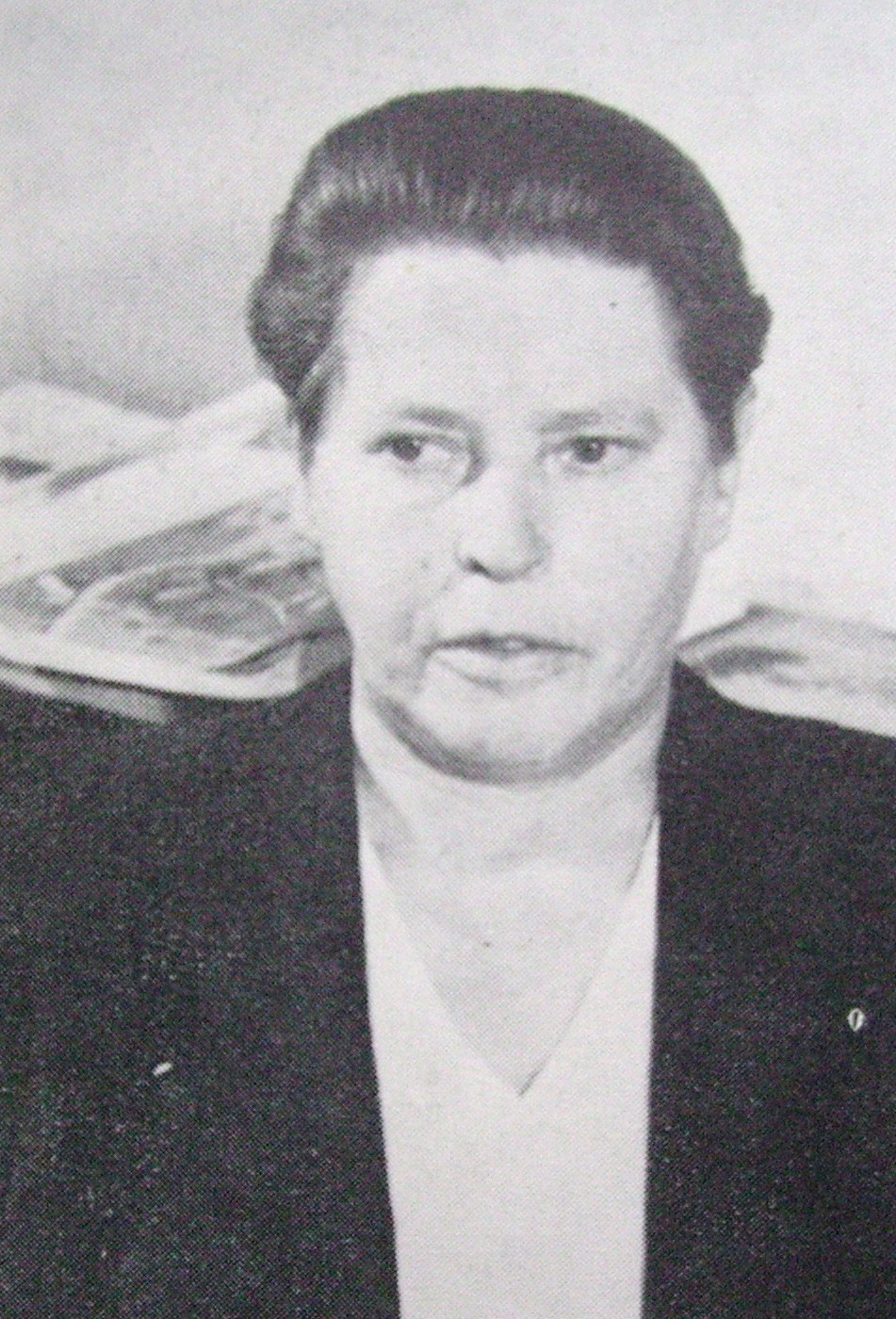
Ebon Andersson in 1959

Ebon Andersson (1896-1969) was a Swedish politician (Moderate Party), and librarian. She was MP of the Second Chamber of the Parliament of Sweden in 1937–1945 and as MP of the First Chamber in 1946-1966.

Andersson was born in poverty in Majorna as one of seven siblings in an apartment with two rooms, and was forced to leave school to work in a textile factory at the age of 13. By the help of evening classes and Folk high school, she was able to take a degree in 1931 and employed as a librarian.

She was the Chair of the Moderate Women in 1938–1958.

Ebon Andersson was a liberal individualist and not a feminist. While she never called herself a feminist, she still indirectly contributed to gender equality through her policy that each individual should have the right to be promoted because of their competence, and that their gender should be irrelevant. She contributed to a major reform in gender equality when she actively worked for the introduction of separate taxation for married women, which in effect made all women (not just unmarried women), taxed equally to men.
