= Robert Halloran =

Canadian swimmer

Personal information
- Full name: Robert Newton Halloran
- Born: December 14, 1906 India
- Died: July 25, 1936 (aged 29) Cleveland, Ohio, United States

Sport
- Sport: Swimming

Robert Newton Halloran (December 14, 1906 – July 25, 1936) was an American swimmer. He competed in two events, representing Canada, at the 1932 Summer Olympics.

Halloran killed himself in 1936, at the age of 29.
