= E.Bon Holdings =

Hardware and fixture company

E.Bon Holdings Limited 怡邦行控股有限公司
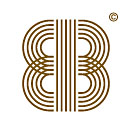
- Type: Listed company (SEHK: 599)
- Industry: Trading
- Founded: 1976 (listed in 2000)
- Headquarters: First Commercial Building, 33 Leighton Road, Causeway Bay, Hong Kong PRC
- Products: Hardware, Bathroom, Kitchen, Furniture
- Website: http://www.ebon.com.hk

E. Bon Holdings Limited is a public company listed in the Hong Kong Stock Exchange and is also known as one of the major architectural hardware, bathroom, and kitchen and furniture suppliers in Hong Kong.

== History ==
In 1976, the first retail shop 'Sunny' was established at Lockhart Road, Wanchai, Hong Kong, mainly selling imported ceramic tiles and subsequently architectural hardware to retail customers. As growing in scale, E. Bon acquired an office at First Commercial Building, Causeway Bay in 1981 and later a warehouse in Aberdeen in the 1980s.

In the early 1990s, E. Bon established showrooms in Macau, Richmond, Beijing, Taipei, Shanghai and Shantou to seek international opportunities, and has eventually become one of the leaders in the industry after years of development. To enhance competitiveness, the Group launched modernisation programmes and intended an Initial Public Offer in the early 2000s for better corporate governance.

On 12 April 2000, the holding company of the Group, E. Bon Holdings Limited, was officially listed on the Hong Kong Stock Exchange Limited. The Group accelerated its expansion after the litigation, which found the Group wrongly prosecuted. The Group engaged in the trading of sanitary wares and bathroom accessories, through new showrooms such as ‘the professional depot’ and 'Sunny Pro'.

In 2004, the Group opened a series of showrooms 'ViA' specialising in trading of furniture and kitchen fittings. ViA supplies furniture and kitchen fittings for commercial and residential projects in Hong Kong, Macau and the mainland China.E.Bon Group.

In 2010, the Group acquired a subsidiary, Shanghai Techpro Interior Decoration Co., Ltd., which undertakes interior decoration and project management, as part of the Group's expansion.
