= James Jackson (cyclist) =

Canadian cyclist

Personal information
- Born: 8 July 1908 Drinkwater, Saskatchewan, Canada
- Died: 22 January 1977 (aged 68) Singapore

Cycling career
- Sport: Cycling

James Jackson (8 July 1908 – 22 January 1977) was a Canadian cyclist. He competed in the individual and team road race events at the 1932 Summer Olympics.
