= Svea Artillery Regiment =

Coordinates: 59°20′35″N 18°05′02″E

- Svea artilleriregemente
- Active: 1794–1997
- Country: Sweden
- Allegiance: Swedish Armed Forces
- Branch: Swedish Army
- Type: Artillery
- Size: Regiment
- Part of: List: 4th Military District (1833–1888); 5th Military District (1889–1893); 4th Army Division (1893–1901); IV Army Division (1902–1927); Eastern Army Division (1928–1936); IV Army Division (1937–1942); IV Military District (1942–1966); Eastern Military District (1966–1991); Middle Military District (1991–1997)
- Garrison/HQ: Linköping
- Colors: Medium blue
- March: "Spirito militare" (Manasse) (Note: The march was established in 1953 by Army Order 33/1953.)
- Anniversaries: 4 December (Note: 4 December is saint day of Saint Barbara.)

Insignia
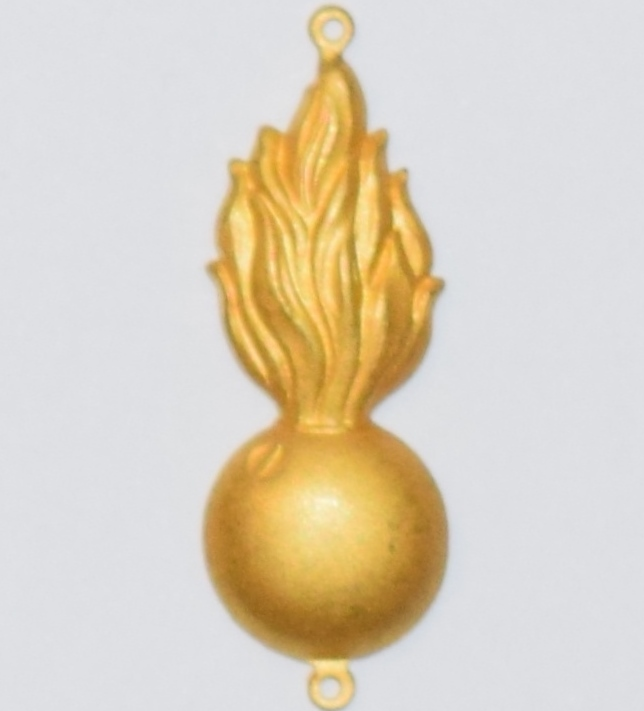
- Branch insignia

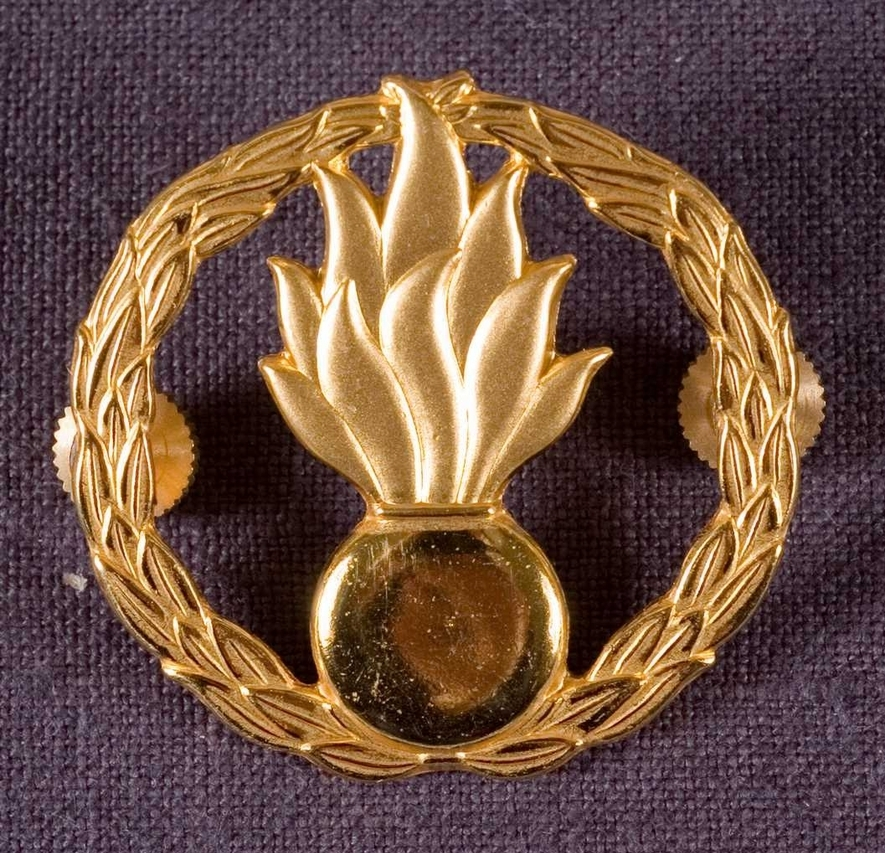
- Cap badge

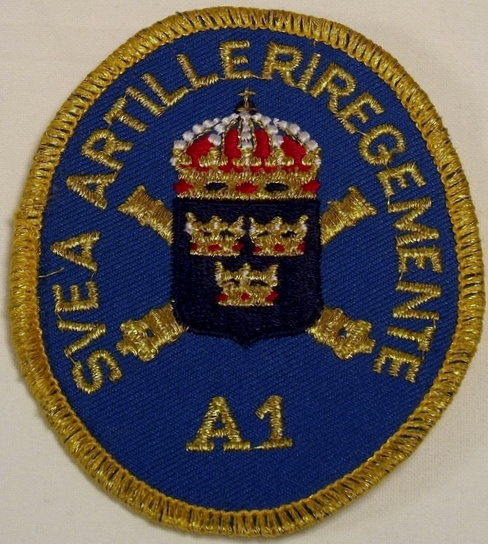
- Shoulder sleeve insignia

The Svea Artillery Regiment (Swedish: Svea artilleriregemente), designation A 1, was a Swedish Army artillery regiment that traced its origins back to the 17th century. It was disbanded in 1997. The regiment's soldiers were originally recruited from Svealand, and it was also garrisoned there.

== History ==
The regiment has its origins in the Artillery Regiment raised in 1636. That regiment was split into four new regiments in 1794 of which Svea Artillery Regiment was one. The regiment was given the designation A 1 (1st Artillery Regiment) in 1830. In 1889 three companies garrisoned in Vaxholm became independent and formed Vaxholm Artillery Corps.

In 1893 another four companies were split off to form Norrland Artillery Regiment and 2nd Svea Artillery Regiment. Due to this the regiment also changed name to 1st Svea Artillery Regiment. The name was changed back again in 1904. The regiment was garrisoned in Stockholm but moved to Linköping in 1963 before being disbanded in 1997.

== Campaigns ==
- ?

== Organisation ==
- ?

== Heraldry and traditions ==
=== Coat of arms ===
The coat of the arms of the Svea Artillery Regiment (A 1) 1977–1997. Blazon: "Azure, the lesser coat of arms of Sweden, three open crowns or. The shield surmounted two gunbarrels of older pattern in saltire or. The gunbarrels may be sable".

=== Medals ===
In 1943, the Svea artilleriregementes (A 1) förtjänstmedalj ("Svea Artillery Regiment (A 1) Medal of Merit") in gold and silver (SveaartregGM/SM) of the 8th size was established. The medal ribbon is divided in blue, red and blue moiré.

In 1997, the Svea artilleriregementes (A 1) minnesmedalj ("Svea Artillery Regiment (A 1) Commemorative Medal") in bronze (SveartregSMM) of the 8th size was established. The medal ribbon is of blue moiré with a broad red stripe on the middle followed on both sides by a yellow stripe.

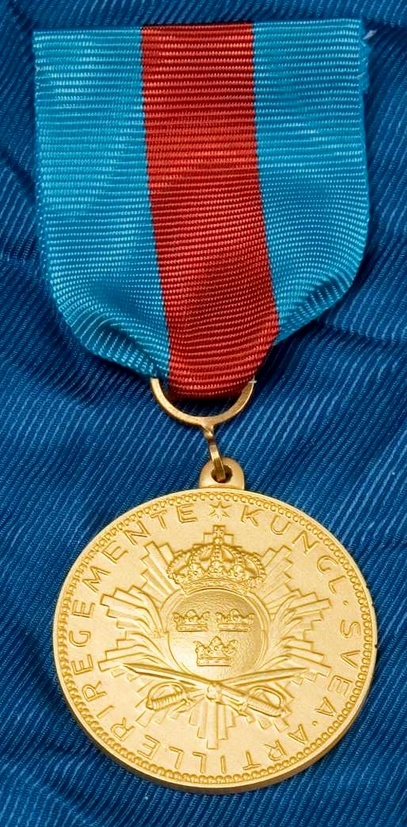
Svea Artillery Regiment (A 1) Medal of Merit m/1997.

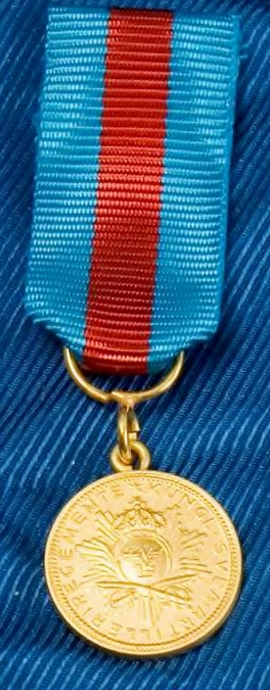
Miniature medal of the Svea Artillery Regiment (A 1) Medal of Merit m/1997.

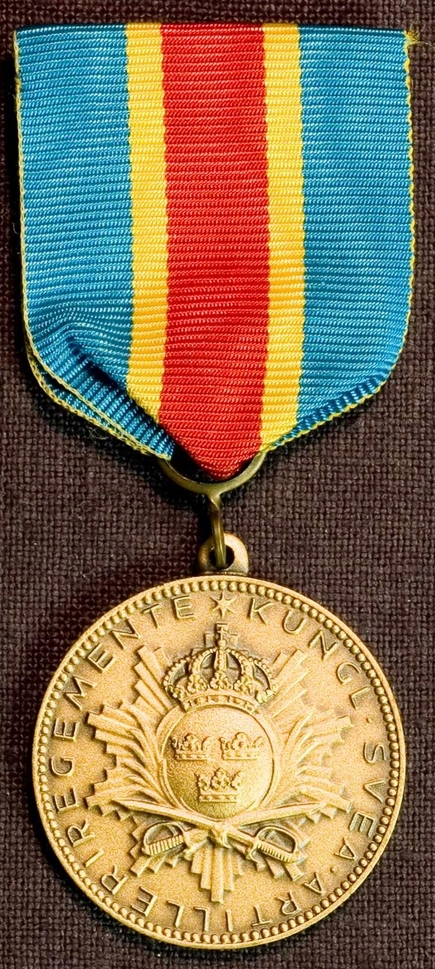
Svea Artillery Regiment (A 1) Commemorative Medal m/1997.

Ribbon bar of Svea Artillery Regiment (A 1) Commemorative Medal m/1997.

== Commanding officers ==
Regimental commanders between 1900 and 1997.

=== Commanders ===
- 1898–1902: Salomon Gottschalk Alfons Geijer
- 1902–1909: Otto Wilhelm Virgin
- 1909–1918: Gabriel Torén
- 1918–1922: Axel Breitholtz
- 1922–1926: Ludvig Hammarskiöld
- 1926–1927: Axel Lyström
- 1928–1935: Pehr Lagerhjelm
- 1935–1937: Sture Gadd
- 1937–1938: Hjalmar Thorén
- 1938–1940: Axel Rappe
- 1940–1941: Samuel Åkerhielm (acting 1939)
- 1941–1941: Gunnar Ekeroth (acting 1941)
- 1941–1942: Gustaf Dyrssen
- 1942–1948: Folke Ericsson
- 1948–1951: Bert Carpelan
- 1951–1953: Karl Ångström
- 1953–1955: Gunnar af Klintberg
- 1955–1959: Bengt Elis Leopold Brucsewitz
- 1959–1961: Stig Lindström
- 1961–1966: Carl Reuterswärd
- 1966–1968: Tore Gustaf Arne Rääf
- 1968–1974: Sven Werner
- 1974–1979: Åke Eriksson
- 1979–1982: Sven Perfors
- 1982–1987: Rune Eriksson
- 1987–1990: Karl-Ivar Pesula
- 1990–1995: Curt-Christer Gustafsson
- 1995–1997: Christer Lidström

=== Deputy commanders ===
- 1974–1976: Lieutenant colonel Fredrik Lilliecreutz

== Names, designations and locations ==
| Name | Translation | From | | To |
|---|---|---|---|---|
| Kungl. Svea artilleriregemente | Royal Svea Artillery Regiment | 1794-06-23 | – | 1892-12-31 |
| Kungl. Första Svea artilleriregemente | Royal First Svea Artillery Regiment | 1893-01-01 | – | 1904-12-07 |
| Kungl. Svea artilleriregemente | Royal Svea Artillery Regiment | 1904-12-08 | – | 1974-12-31 |
| Svea artilleriregemente | Svea Artillery Regiment | 1975-01-01 | – | 1997-12-31 |
| Designation | | From | | To |
| No. 1 | | 1830-??-?? | – | 1914-09-30 |
| A 1 | | 1914-10-01 | – | 1997-12-31 |
| Location | | From | | To |
| Stockholm Garrison | | 1877-??-?? | – | 1949-06-08 |
| Sundbyberg/Rissne | | 1946-11-04 | – | 1963-03-31 |
| Linköping Garrison | | 1963-04-01 | – | 1997-12-31 |

== See also ==
- List of Swedish artillery regiments
