= Stig Lindström =

Swedish fencer

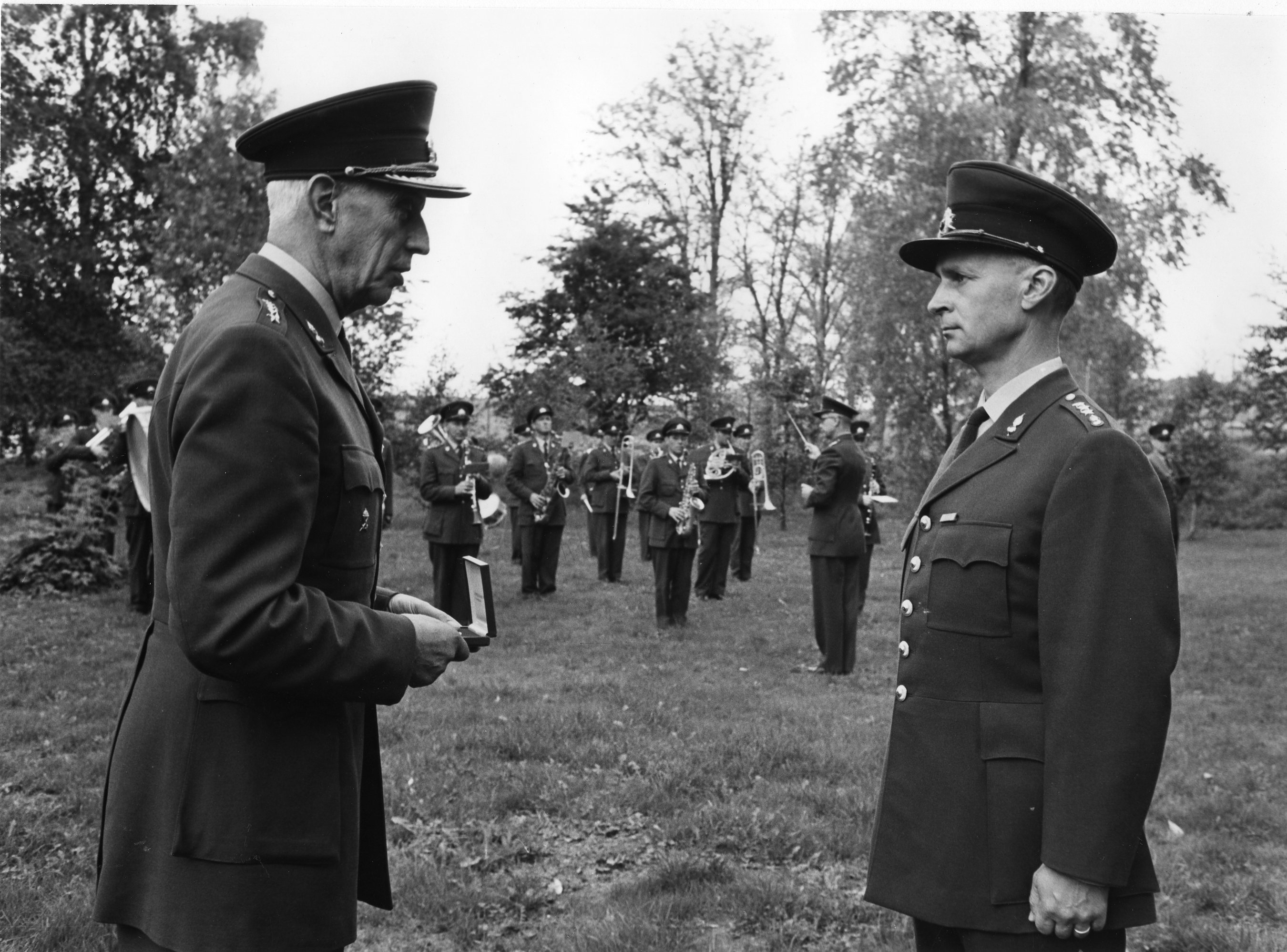
- Lindström (left) in 1964.
- Born: Stig Oscarsson Lindström; 4 September 1904; Stockholm, Sweden
- Died: 15 December 1975 (aged 71); Stockholm, Sweden
- Military career
- Allegiance: Sweden
- Branch: Swedish Army
- Service years: 1924–1964
- Rank: Colonel
- Commands: Norrland Artillery Regiment; Svea Artillery Regiment; Inspector of the Artillery

Colonel Stig Oscarsson Lindström (9 September 1904 – 15 December 1975) was a Swedish Army officer and fencer.

== Early life ==
Lindström was born on 9 September 1904 in Stockholm, Sweden, the son of Lieutenant Colonel Oscar Lindström and his wife Enny Markstedt.

== Career ==
=== Military career ===
Lindström was commissioned as an officer in 1924 and was assigned as a second lieutenant to Svea Artillery Regiment. He attended the Higher Course of the Artillery and Engineering College from 1928 to 1930 and became captain of the Artillery Staff in 1936. Lindström was appointed major in Boden Artillery Regiment in 1942 and in the General Staff Corps in 1944. He then served as chief of staff in the Artillery Inspectorate (Artilleriinspektionen) from 1944 to 1946 when he was promoted to lieutenant colonel. Lindström served as teacher at the Swedish Army Artillery School (Artilleriskjutskolan, ArtSS) from 1946 to 1949 and was then promoted to colonel in 1950 and was commander of the Swedish Army Artillery School from 1950 to 1952. He served as regimental commander of Norrland Artillery Regiment from 1952 to 1959 and of Svea Artillery Regiment from 1959 to 1961. He then served as Inspector of the Artillery from 1961 to 1964 when he retired.

=== Sports career ===
He competed in the individual épée event at the 1932 Summer Olympics.

== Personal life ==
In 1937, he married Fanny Norström (born 1914), the daughter of Major Torsten Norström and Anna Lagergren.

== Dates of rank ==
- 1924 – Second lieutenant
- 1928 – Lieutenant
- 1936 – Captain
- 1942 – Major
- 1946 – Lieutenant colonel
- 1950 – Colonel

== Honours ==
- Member of the Royal Swedish Academy of War Sciences (1951)

Military offices
Preceded by Erik Kihlblom	Inspector of the Artillery; 1961–1964	Succeeded by Walter Lundqvist
