= Imre Petneházy =

Hungarian fencer

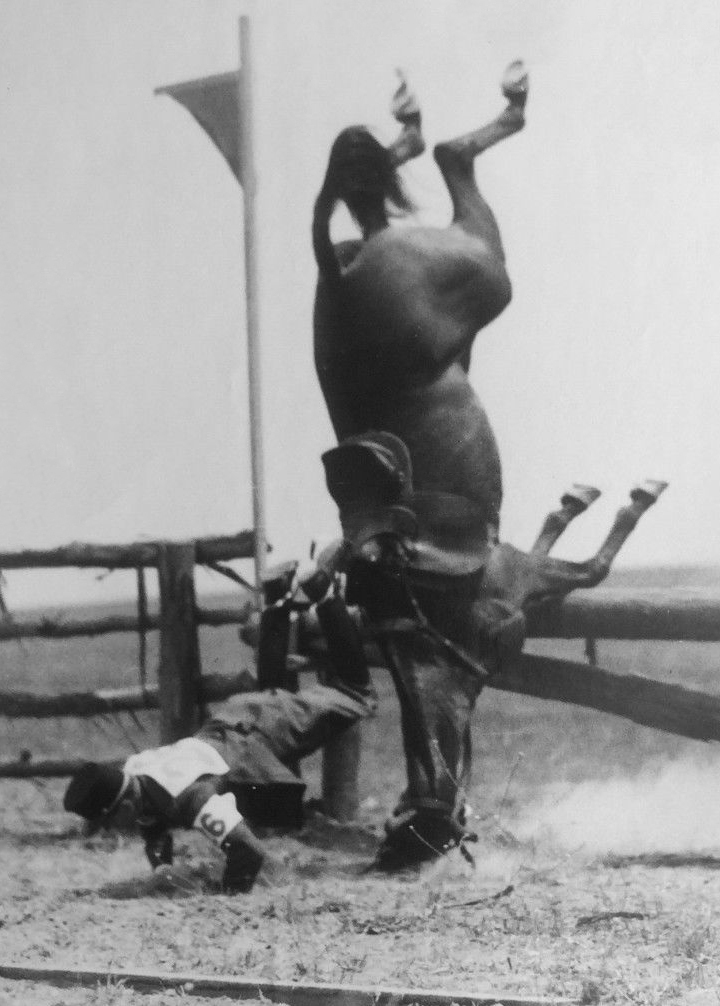
- Petneházy crashing at the 1932 Olympics. Neither the rider nor the horse were injured; Petneházy remounted and finished the race.

Personal information
- Born: 13 April 1905 Újvidék, Austria-Hungary (today Novi Sad, Serbia)
- Died: 23 September 1972 (aged 67)

Sport
- Sport: Fencing, Modern pentathlon
- Club: Ludovika Akadémia Sportegyesület; Magyar Atlétikai Klub

Imre Petneházy (13 April 1905 – 23 September 1972) was a Hungarian épée fencer and modern pentathlete. He competed in these two events at the 1932 Summer Olympics and placed 19th in the pentathlon.
