= Ruth Kerr =

Canadian swimmer (1916–1974)

Personal information
- Full name: Ruth Kerr
- National team: Canada
- Born: March 16, 1916 Windsor, Ontario
- Died: June 17, 1974 (aged 58) London, Ontario

Sport
- Sport: Swimming
- Strokes: Backstroke, freestyle

Ruth Kerr (March 8, 1916 – June 17, 1974), later known by her married name Ruth Todd, was a Canadian freestyle and backstroke swimmer who competed at the 1932 Summer Olympics in Los Angeles.

== Life ==
Kerr was born in 1916 and her parents started the Border Cities Swimming Club in 1930. At the time it was reportedly the largest swimming club in Canada. She trained at the club's quarters at Kennedy Collegiate in Windsor.

As a 16-year-old in 1932, she was a member of the Canadian team which finished fourth in the 4x100-metre freestyle relay, swimming the third leg of four in the relay. The other relay swimmers were Irene Pirie, Betty Edwards, and Betty Mullen. She also participated in the qualifying heats of the 400-metre freestyle and 100-metre backstroke, but in both she was eliminated in the first round.

Kerr was the first Windsor-born athlete to participate in an Olympic Games. She was also the youngest member of the 1932 Canadian Olympic Team.

Kerr was inducted into the Essex Sports Hall of Fame in September 1987. She worked as a school teacher for many years, and married Robert Todd in 1948. The couple had four children (Kathy, Kerry, Bobby and Kristy). On September 21, 2013, Kerr was inducted into the Ontario Aquatic Hall of Fame as a Pioneer Swimmer. Her oldest daughter, Kathy, made a brief presentation and accepted the award on behalf of the family. Her second daughter, Kari, attended the induction ceremony, as did her husband and her children.

Ruth's younger brother, Gordon Kerr competed in the 100 metre backstroke in the 1936 Olympics in Berlin
