= Ebone =

Ebone may refer to:

- Ebone, Cameroon, a town and commune in Cameroon
- EBONE, a pan-European Internet backbone
