= Gustaf Dyrssen =

Swedish officer and sportsman

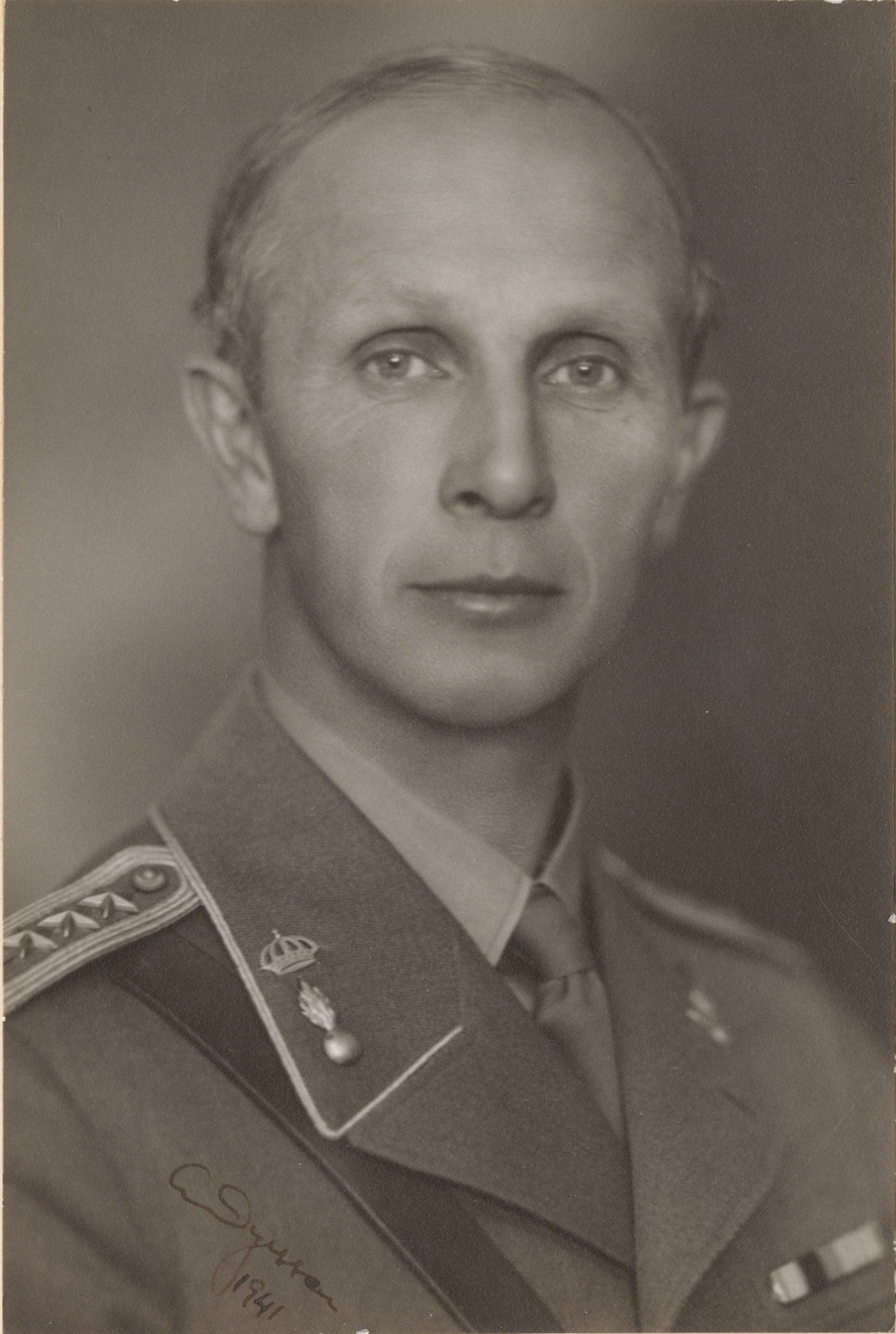
- Colonel Dyrssen in 1941.
- Born: Gustaf Peder Wilhelm Dyrssen; 24 November 1891; Stockholm, Sweden
- Died: 13 May 1981 (aged 89); Kungsängen, Sweden
- Relatives: Wilhelm Dyrssen (father); Lizinka af Uggla (mother); Magnus Dyrssen (brother)
- Military career
- Allegiance: Sweden
- Branch: Swedish Army
- Service years: 1912–1957
- Rank: Lieutenant General
- Commands: Gotland Artillery Corps; Svea Artillery Regiment; Boden Fortress; IV Military District; Commandant General in Stockholm

Gustaf Dyrssen
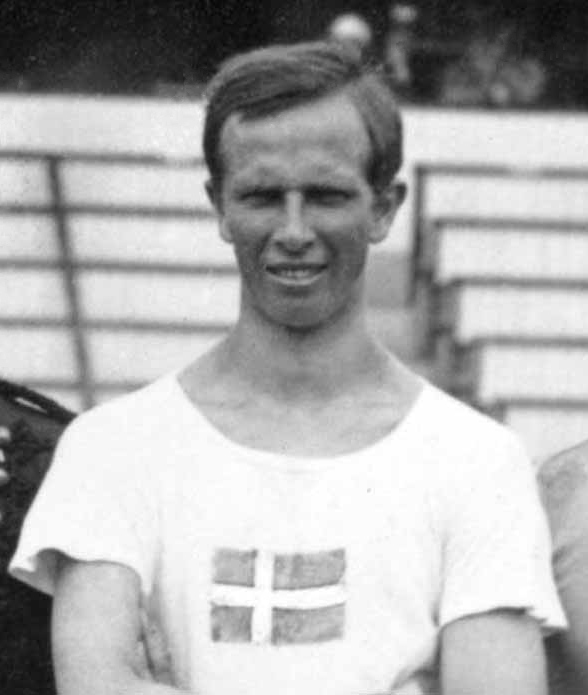
- Dyrssen at the 1920 Olympics in Antwerp, Belgium

Medal record

Representing Sweden

Modern pentathlon

Olympic Games
Gold medal – first place	1920 Antwerp	Modern pentathlon
Silver medal – second place	1924 Paris	Modern pentathlon

Fencing

Olympic Games
Silver medal – second place	1936 Berlin	Team épée

Lieutenant General Gustaf Peder Wilhelm Dyrssen (24 November 1891 – 13 May 1981) was a Swedish Army officer and Olympic modern pentathlete. Dyrssen had an extensive and distinguished military career, starting as a second lieutenant in the Svea Artillery Regiment in 1912. Over the years, he rose through the ranks, serving in various capacities, including as a captain in the General Staff and as the commander of the Svea Artillery Regiment. His career highlights include being appointed major in 1934, major general in 1944, and eventually serving as the military commander of the IV Military District and the Commandant General in Stockholm from 1945 to 1957. Dyrssen retired from the Army in 1957 but continued as lieutenant general in the reserve.

Beyond his military achievements, Dyrssen was a successful athlete. He excelled in the modern pentathlon, winning a gold medal in 1920 and a silver medal in 1924 at the Summer Olympics. Additionally, he earned medals in épée at the world championships and national titles in various years. Dyrssen's sports involvement extended to administration, where he held prominent positions such as president of the Swedish Fencing Federation, president of the International Modern Pentathlon Union, and a member of the International Olympic Committee.

In addition to his military and athletic pursuits, Dyrssen was actively involved in various committees and organizations, including chairing the Railway Preparedness Investigation and the Inter-Scandinavian Transit Committee. He also served on the Swedish Olympic Committee and held leadership roles in associations promoting sports and outdoor activities.

== Early life ==
Dyrssen was born on 24 November 1891 in Stockholm, Sweden, the son of admiral Wilhelm Dyrssen and baroness Lizinka af Uggla. His brother, Magnus Dyrssen, became lieutenant colonel and served in Finland during the Winter War where he was killed in action.

== Career ==
=== Military career ===
He was commissioned into the Svea Artillery Regiment (A 1) as a second lieutenant in 1912 and attended at the Artillery and Engineering College from 1914 to 1915. Dyrssen became a lieutenant in 1915 and attended at the Royal Swedish Army Staff College from 1917 to 1919. He was a cadet in the General Staff from 1920 to 1922, became captain in 1924 and served at the State Railways from 1924 to 1926. Dyrssen was a teacher at the Artillery and Engineering College from 1926 to 1932, captain in the Svea Artillery Regiment from 1930 to 1932, captain in the General Staff in 1932 and served as bureau chief at the Railway Board (Järnvägsstyrelsen) from 1932 to 1937.

He was appointed to major in 1934 and was the first adjutant and lieutenant colonel in the General Staff in 1937. Dyrssen was head of the Communications Department of the Defence Staff from 1937 to 1939 and lieutenant colonel and commander of the Gotland Artillery Corps (A 7) in 1939. Dyrssen was appointed colonel in 1940 and was commander of the Svea Artillery Regiment from 1941 to 1942, the commandant of the Boden Fortress as well as the deputy military commander of the VI Military District from 1942 to 1945. He was appointed major general in 1944 and was the military commander of the IV Military District and the Commandant General in Stockholm from 1945 to 1957. He retired from the Army in 1957 and was appointed lieutenant general in the reserve.

=== Athletic career ===
Dyrssen won the eventing contest at the 1916 Swedish Games. In the modern pentathlon he won a gold medal at the 1920 and a silver medal at the 1924 Summer Olympics. He competed in the individual and team épée at the 1924, 1928 and 1936 Olympics and won a team silver medal in 1936. He won seven medals in the épée at the world championships of 1931–1938, as well as three national titles, in 1927, 1932 and 1952, aged 60. Dyrssen won the modern pentathlon at the Nordiska Idrætslege in Copenhagen in 1921, the patrol competition on skis at the 1922 Nordic Games and the Swedish Championship in modern pentathlon in 1922.

Dyrssen was a prominent sports administrator, serving as president of the Swedish Fencing Federation (1936–1940), president of the International Modern Pentathlon Union (IUPM, 1949–1960), and a member of the International Olympic Committee (1952–1970), among other posts.

=== Other work ===
Dyrssen was chairman of the Railway Preparedness Investigation from 1935 to 1937, the Inter-Scandinavian Transit Committee in 1939 and the 1945 Military Investigation from 1945 to 1946. He became a member of the Swedish Olympic Committee in 1946 and was chairman of the Swedish Central Association for Sports Promotion (Sveriges centralförening för idrottens främjande) from 1947 to 1961, the Swedish Fencing Federation from 1936 to 1940, the Union Internationale de Pentathlon Moderne and the Biathlon Association from 1949 to 1960. Dyrssen was a member of the International Olympic Committee from 1952 to 1970 and of the Royal Swedish Academy of War Sciences in 1936. He was CEO of the Society for the Promotion of Ski Sport and Open Air Life (Skid- och friluftsfrämjandet) from 1958 to 1962 and chairman of Uppsala County Hunting Association (Uppsala läns jaktvårdsförening).

== Personal life ==
Dyrssen was married from 1915 to 1953 to Maia Wennerholm (1894–1980), daughter of colonel Malcolm Wennerholm and Elsa Broman. He married a second time in 1953 to Eva Hallin (1910–2007), daughter of the chamberlain Axel Hallin and Helga Kreuger. He was the father of David (born 1922), Gerry (born 1923), Marika (born 1935), Thérese (born 1936) and Wilhelm (born 1938).

== Dates of rank ==
- 1912 – Underlöjtnant
- 1915 – Lieutenant
- 1924 – Captain
- 1934 – Major
- 1937 – Lieutenant colonel
- 1940 – Colonel
- 1944 – Major general
- 1957 – Lieutenant general

== Awards and decorations ==
=== Swedish ===
- (Sweden) King Gustaf V's Jubilee Commemorative Medal (1948)
- (Sweden) Commander Grand Cross of the Order of the Sword (6 June 1951)
- (Sweden) Knight of the Order of the Polar Star
- (Sweden) Knight of the Order of Vasa
- (Sweden) Swedish Fencing Federation Honorary Shield (Svenska fäktförbundets hederssköld) (1940)
- (Sweden) Sport badge in gold
- Sweden's Military Sports Federation's gold medal with wreath

=== Foreign ===
- Grand Cross of the Order of the Lion of Finland
- (Norway) Grand Cross of the Order of St. Olav (1 July 1953)
- (Chile) Grand Officer of the Order of Merit
- (Denmark) Commander 1st Class of the Order of the Dannebrog
- (United Kingdom) Honorary Knight Commander of the Royal Victorian Order (June 1956)
- (Netherlands) Commander of the Order of Orange-Nassau with swords
- (Nazi Germany) 1st Class of the Order of the German Eagle

Military offices
Preceded by None	Defence Staff's Communications Department; 1937–1939	Succeeded by Hilding Kring
Preceded by Carl-Gustaf Hamilton	Gotland Artillery Corps; 1939–1941	Succeeded by Curt Kempff
Preceded by Helmer Bratt	Boden Fortress; 1942–1945	Succeeded by Gustaf Ehrenborg
Preceded by Arvid Moberg	IV Military District; 1945–1957	Succeeded by Bert Carpelan
Preceded by Arvid Moberg	Commandant General in Stockholm; 1945–1957	Succeeded by Bert Carpelan
Sporting positions
Preceded by Tor Wibom	President of International Modern Pentathlon Union; 1949–1960	Succeeded by Sven Thofelt
