= Lew Rush =

Canadian cyclist

Personal information
- Full name: Lewis Franklin Rush
- Born: 12 September 1912 Victoria, British Columbia, Canada
- Died: 27 October 1999 (aged 87) White Rock, British Columbia, Canada

Cycling career
- Sport: Cycling

Lewis Franklin Rush (12 September 1912 – 27 October 1999) was a Canadian cyclist. He competed in the time trial and the team pursuit events at the 1932 Summer Olympics. He was inducted into the Greater Victoria Sports Hall of Fame in 2007.
