= Wilhelm Dyrssen =

Swedish Navy officer

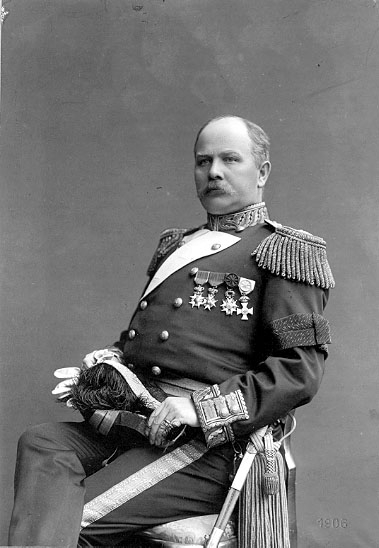
- Born: March 26, 1858; Hagelberg, Sweden
- Died: July 14, 1929 (aged 71); Stockholm, Sweden
- Relatives: Gustaf Dyrssen (son); Magnus Dyrssen (son)
- Military career
- Allegiance: Sweden
- Branch: Swedish Navy
- Service years: 1877–1923
- Rank: Admiral
- Commands: Inspector of the Navy's Exercises at Sea; Coastal Fleet; Stockholm Naval Station
- Other work: Minister for Naval Affairs (1906–07)

Admiral Wilhelm Dyrssen (26 March 1858 – 14 July 1929) was a senior Swedish Navy officer. He served as minister for naval affairs from 1906 to 1907, and the Inspector of the Navy's Exercises at Sea from 1907 to 1916, as well as commander of the Stockholm Naval Station from 1916 to 1923.

== Early life ==
Dyrssen was born on 26 March 1858 at Klagstorp mansion in Hagelberg Parish, Skaraborg County. He was the son of the landowner Peder Johan Julius Dyrssen and his wife Gustafva Wilhelmina (née Hagerman). Dyrssen was younger brother to Gerhard Dyrssen (1854–1938) and twin brother of Gustaf Dyrssen (1858–1934).

== Career ==
Wilhelm Dyrssen and his twin brother Gustaf graduated from the Royal Swedish Naval Academy in autumn 1877. Dyrssen devoted himself as an officer first at the technology of the naval artillery and then to staff duty and advancing to higher positions at sea. He studied at the Artillery and Engineering College from 1880 to 1883, becoming a sub-lieutenant in 1882. From 1883 to 1885, Dyrssen participated in the frigate Vanadis global circumnavigation. After returning home he served at the Royal Swedish Naval Materiel Administration from 1887 to 1889 and as a teacher at the Royal Swedish Naval Academy from 1886 to 1893 and as a cadet officer from 1892 to 1893. Dyrssen became lieutenant in 1888 and served in the Fleet Staff from 1889 to 1892 and was head of the Artillery Department at the Naval Station in Karlskrona from 1894 to 1899. In 1899, he became head of the Artillery Department at the Royal Swedish Naval Materiel Administration, a position he stayed in until 1904. Dyrssen was promoted to lieutenant commander in 1898, to commander in 1901 and to captain in 1903.

In addition to this, he was hired as an expert on various issues relating to the navy, including the 1902 Warships Building Committee. After being minister for naval affairs from 1906 to 1907 in Arvid Lindman's first cabinet, he was called as a member of the committee, which had the task of examining the issue of an adequate coastal defence ship type and whose work resulted in the then under the political feuds much talked-about F-type. He was appointed rear admiral already at 46 years of age in 1904 and became Inspector of the Navy's Exercises at Sea, a position he stayed in until 1916. In 1905, Dyrssen became the Highest Commander (högste befälhavare) of the Coastal Fleet. In this position, he got the opportunity to develop an unshakable calm as well as other solid commander qualities, especially during preparedness along the Swedish west coast in connection with Union crisis in 1905. As inspector he demonstrated an extraordinarily confident glance and an infallible judgment. On his responsible post, he remained even during the first stage of World War I. In 1910, Dyrssen became a military member of the Supreme Court of Sweden and in the year after, he was promoted to vice admiral. He resigned from the position of Highest Commander of the Coastal Fleet in 1916, and was appointed station commander of Stockholm Naval Station. He left active service in 1923 and thereby received the highest of the three admiralty ranks.

== Later life ==
The last years he devoted himself mainly to the management of his property Öråker near Mälarestäket and he also took a leading position as vice chairman in Sweden's Agricultural Employers Central Association (Sveriges lantarbetsgivares centralförening), and chairman of the General Electoral League (Allmänna valmansförbundet) in Uppsala County.

Dyrssen became a member of the Royal Swedish Society of Naval Sciences in 1893 and honorary member in 1904. He became a member of the Royal Swedish Academy of War Sciences in 1899. Dyrssen was editor of the journal Tidskrift i Sjöväsendet from 1894 to 1898.

== Personal life ==
In 1888, Dyrssen was married to baroness Lizinka af Ugglas (1866–1952), the daughter of Gustaf af Ugglas and Therese Björnstjerna. He was the father of Gustaf Dyrssen and Magnus Dyrssen.

== Dates of rank ==
- 1877 – Underlöjtnant
- 1881 – Sub-lieutenant
- 1888 – Lieutenant
- 1898 – Lieutenant commander
- 1901 – Commander
- 1903 – Captain
- 1911 – Rear admiral
- 1917 – Vice admiral
- 1923 – Admiral

== Awards ==
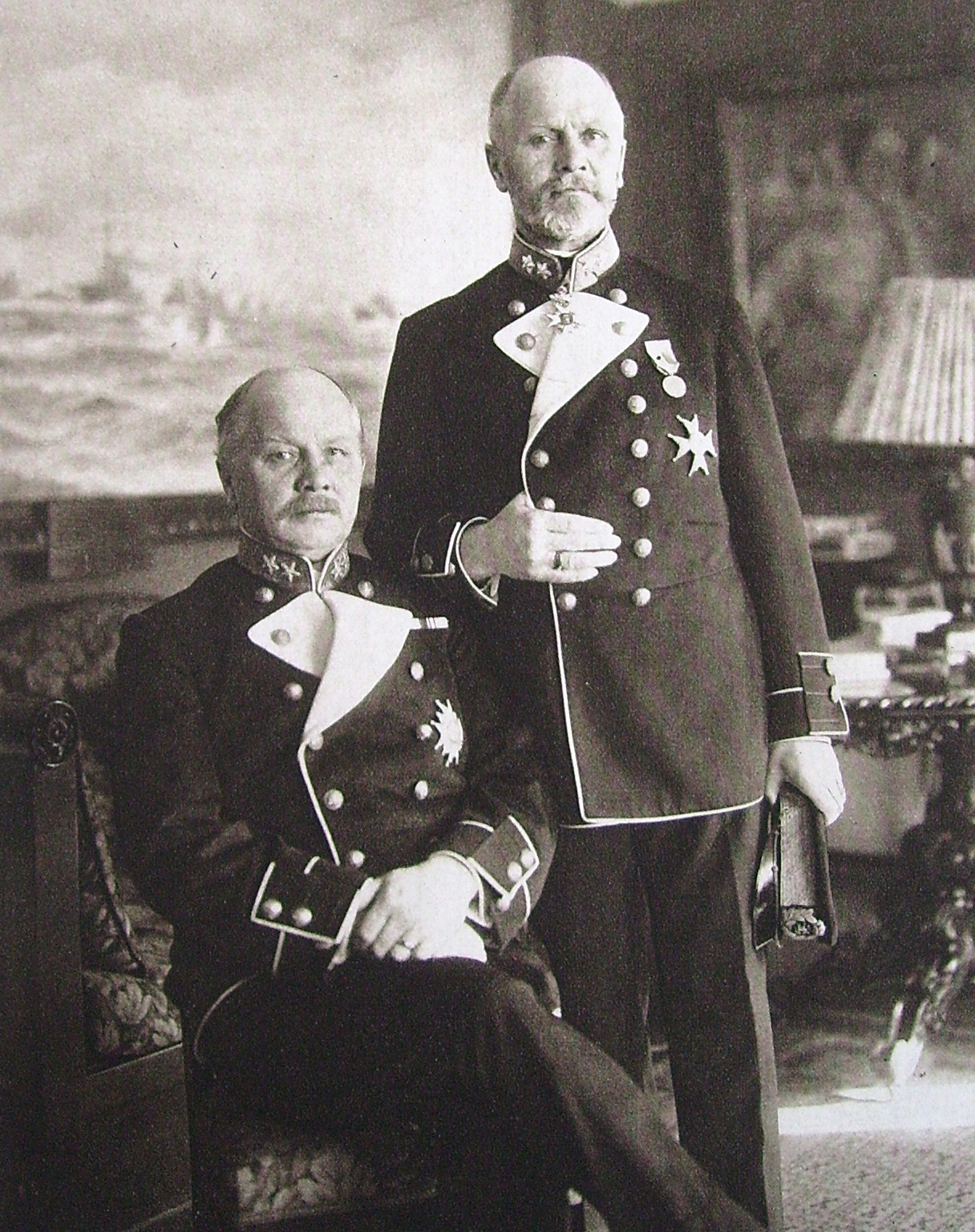
Wilhelm (left) and his twin brother, admiral Gustaf Dyrssen.

=== Swedish ===
- (Sweden) Knight and Commander of the Orders of His Majesty the King (Order of the Seraphim) (1928)
- (Sweden) Commander Grand Cross of the Order of the Sword (6 June 1912)
- (Sweden) Commander 1st Class of the Order of the Sword (1 December 1905)
- (Sweden) Knight 1st Class of the Order of the Sword (1897)
- (Sweden) Knight of the Order of the Polar Star (1900)

=== Foreign ===
- (Denmark) Grand Cross of the Order of the Dannebrog (1913)
- Grand Cross of the Order of the White Rose of Finland (1919)
- (France) Grand Cross of the Order of the Black Star (between 1909 and 1915)
- (Italy) Knight Grand Cross of the Order of Saints Maurice and Lazarus (between 1909 and 1915)
- (Kingdom of Prussia) Knight 1st Class of the Order of the Red Eagle (between 1909 and 1915)
- (Kingdom of Prussia) Knight 4th Class of the Order of the Red Eagle (between 1881 and 1905)
- (Kingdom of Prussia) Knight 1st Class of the Order of the Crown (between 1905 and 1908)
- (Russian Empire) Knight 1st Class of the Order of St. Anna (between 1909 and 1915)
- (Russian Empire) Knight 1st Class of the Order of Saint Stanislaus (between 1909 and 1915)
- (United Kingdom) Grand Cross of the Royal Victorian Order (17 November 1908)
- (France) Commander of the Legion of Honour (between 1908 and 1909)
- (France) Officer of the Legion of Honour (between 1881 and 1905)
- Officer of the Royal Order of the Crown of Hawaii (1884)

Government offices
Preceded by Ludvig Sidner	Minister for Naval Affairs; 1906–1907	Succeeded by Carl August Ehrensvärd
Military offices
Preceded by None	Inspector of the Navy's Exercises at Sea; 1904–1906	Succeeded by Carl Olsen
Preceded by Carl Olsen	Inspector of the Navy's Exercises at Sea; 1907–1916	Succeeded by Carl August Ehrensvärd
Preceded by Carl August Ehrensvärd	Stockholm Naval Station; 1916–1923	Succeeded by Carl Alarik Wachtmeister
