= Irene Mullen =

Canadian swimmer

Personal information
- Full name: Irene Emma Mullen
- National team: Canada
- Born: February 16, 1914 Hamilton, Ontario, Canada
- Died: December 26, 1981 (aged 67) Dunnville, Ontario, Canada

Sport
- Sport: Swimming
- Strokes: Freestyle

Irene Emma Mullen (February 16, 1914 – December 26, 1981), later known by her married name Irene Warnick, was a Canadian freestyle swimmer who competed in the 1932 Summer Olympics in Los Angeles. In 1932 she was a member of the Canadian relay team which finished fourth in the 4x100-metre freestyle relay. In the 100-metre freestyle, she was eliminated in the first round.
