= Doris de Jong =

Dutch fencer (1902–1991)

Personal information
- Born: 1 February 1902 Amsterdam, Netherlands
- Died: 11 April 1991 (aged 89) Thousand Oaks, California, United States

Sport
- Sport: Fencing

Doris de Jong (1 February 1902 – 11 April 1991) was a Dutch épée, foil and sabre fencer. He competed at the 1928 and 1932 Summer Olympics.
