= Henri Delcellier =

Canadian fencer

Personal information
- Born: 3 June 1902 Béziers, France
- Died: 16 May 1975 (aged 72) Hudson, Québec, Canada

Sport
- Sport: Fencing

Henri Delcellier (3 June 1902 – 16 May 1975) was a Canadian fencer. He competed in the team épée event at the 1932 Summer Olympics.
