= Harold Corbin =

American fencer (1906–1988)

Personal information
- Born: December 31, 1906 Winfield, Kansas, United States
- Died: June 12, 1988 (aged 81) Sherman Oaks, California, United States

Sport
- Sport: Fencing

Harold Corbin (December 31, 1906 – June 12, 1988) was an American fencer. He competed in the individual épée event at the 1932 Summer Olympics.
