= Glen Robbins =

Canadian cyclist

Personal information
- Born: 13 July 1912 Victoria, British Columbia, Canada
- Died: 22 January 1992 (aged 79) Duncan, British Columbia, Canada

Cycling career
- Sport: Cycling

Glen Robbins (13 July 1912 – 22 January 1992) was a Canadian cyclist. He competed in three events at the 1932 Summer Olympics.
