= Xavier De Beukelaer =

Belgian fencer

Personal information
- Born: 27 September 1902 Antwerp, Belgium
- Died: 1 December 1944 (aged 42) Antwerp, Belgium

Sport
- Sport: Fencing

Balthazar Philippe François Xavier De Beukelaer (27 September 1902 – 1 December 1944) was a Belgian fencer. He competed in three Olympic Games.
