= Frank Elliott (cyclist) =

Canadian cyclist

Personal information
- Born: 5 July 1911 Vancouver, British Columbia, Canada
- Died: 11 January 1964 (aged 52) Vancouver, British Columbia, Canada

Cycling career
- Sport: Cycling

Frank Elliott (5 July 1911 – 11 January 1964) was a Canadian cyclist. He competed in three events at the 1932 Summer Olympics.
