= Bertram Markus =

Canadian fencer

Personal information
- Born: 4 October 1899 Pembroke, Ontario, Canada
- Died: 1 April 1960 (aged 60) Toronto, Ontario, Canada

Sport
- Sport: Fencing

Bertram Markus (4 October 1899 – 1 April 1960) was a Canadian fencer. He competed in three events at the 1932 Summer Olympics.
