= Paul de Graffenried =

Swiss fencer

Personal information
- Born: 10 June 1900
- Died: 17 November 1945 (aged 45)

Sport
- Sport: Fencing

Paul de Graffenried (10 June 1900 – 17 November 1945) was a Swiss fencer. He competed at the 1928, 1932 and 1936 Summer Olympics.
