= Patrick Farrell (fencer) =

Canadian fencer

Personal information
- Born: 1892 Fortuneswell Dorset England
- Died: 25 October 1969 (aged 76–77)

Sport
- Sport: Fencing

Patrick Farrell (1892 – 25 October 1969) was a Canadian fencer. He competed in the individual épée, individual sabre, and team épée events at the 1932 Summer Olympics.
