= André Poplimont =

Belgian ice hockey player and fencer

Personal information
- Born: 18 April 1893 Antwerp, Belgium
- Died: 27 February 1973 (aged 79) Brussels, Belgium

Sport
- Sport: Ice hockey, fencing
- Club: CPA, Antwerp
Medal record
Representing Belgium
Ice Hockey European Championships
| Bronze medal – third place | 1924 Milan | Team |

André Georges Poplimont (18 April 1893 – 27 February 1973) was a Belgian ice hockey player and fencer. As a hockey player he won a bronze medal at the 1924 European Championships and finished seventh at the 1924 Winter Olympics. As a fencer he placed fourth in the team épée event at the 1932 Summer Olympics.
