= Max Janlet =

Belgian fencer

Personal information
- Born: 10 January 1903 Saint-Gilles, Belgium
- Died: 8 December 1976 (aged 73) Brussels, Belgium

Sport
- Sport: Fencing

Max Janlet (10 January 1903 – 8 December 1976) was a Belgian garden architect, painter-decorator and patron. He practiced fencing and competed at the 1928 and 1932 Summer Olympics.
