= Eddie Testa =

American cyclist

Personal information
- Born: December 1, 1910 Los Angeles, California, United States
- Died: December 9, 1998 (aged 88) Los Angeles, California, United States

Cycling career
- Sport: Cycling

Eddie Testa (December 1, 1910 – December 9, 1998) was an American cyclist who competed in the 1932 Summer Olympics.
