= Ruggero Berti =

American cyclist (1909–1985)

Personal information
- Born: January 28, 1909 San Jose, California, U.S.
- Died: December 29, 1985 (aged 76) San Jose, California, U.S.

Cycling career
- Sport: Cycling

Ruggero Berti (January 28, 1909 – December 29, 1985) was an American cyclist who competed in the 1932 Summer Olympics.
