= Diving at the 1936 Summer Olympics =

Diving at the Games of the XI Olympiad
- Venue: Olympiapark Schwimmstadion Berlin
- Dates: 10 August 1936 through 15 August 1936
- No. of events: 4
- Competitors: 69 from 21 nations

At the 1936 Summer Olympics in Berlin, four diving events were contested, two for men, and two for women. The competitions were held from Monday 10 August 1936 to Saturday 15 August 1936.

== Medal summary ==
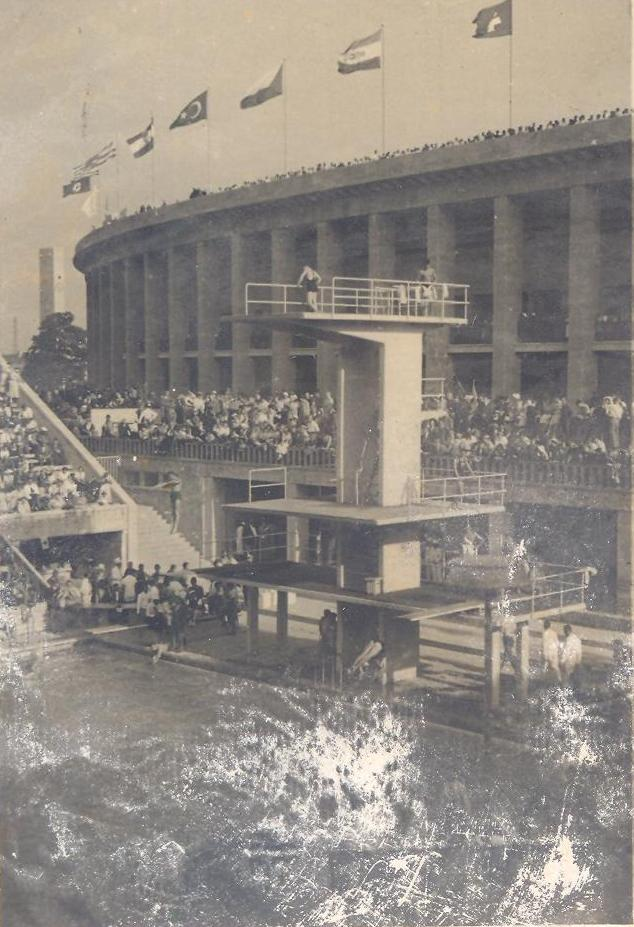
Diving at the 1936 Summer Olympics

The events are labelled as 3 metre springboard and 10 metre platform by the International Olympic Committee, and appeared on the 1937 Official Report as springboard diving and high diving, respectively. Following the reduction of the springboard events to the 3 metre height, in 1932, the platform events were also reduced to dives from the 10 metre platform, but only for men. Meanwhile, women still dived from both 10 and 5 metre heights.

=== Men ===
Event	Gold	Silver	Bronze
3 m springboard	Richard Degener (USA)	Marshall Wayne (USA)	Alan Greene (USA)
10 m platform	Marshall Wayne (USA)	Elbert Root (USA)	Hermann Stork (GER)

=== Women ===
Event	Gold	Silver	Bronze
3 m springboard	Marjorie Gestring (USA)	Katherine Rawls (USA)	Dorothy Poynton-Hill (USA)
10 m platform	Dorothy Poynton-Hill (USA)	Velma Dunn (USA)	Käthe Köhler (GER)

== Participating nations ==
A total of 69 divers (39 men and 30 women) from 21 nations (men from 20 nations - women from 11 nations) competed at the Berlin Games:

- Australia (1) (men:1 women:0)
- Austria (3) (men:1 women:2)
- Canada (3) (men:1 women:2)
- Czechoslovakia (3) (men:3 women:0)
- Denmark (2) (men:0 women:2)
- Egypt (4) (men:4 women:0)
- Finland (1) (men:1 women:0)
- France (2) (men:1 women:1)
- Germany (11) (men:5 women:6)
- Great Britain (6) (men:2 women:4)
- Hungary (2) (men:2 women:0)
- Italy (3) (men:3 women:0)
- Japan (5) (men:2 women:3)
- Mexico (1) (men:1 women:0)
- Netherlands (1) (men:1 women:0)
- Norway (3) (men:1 women:2)
- Peru (1) (men:1 women:0)
- Sweden (3) (men:1 women:2)
- Switzerland (3) (men:2 women:1)
- United States (10) (men:5 women:5)
- Yugoslavia (1) (men:1 women:0)

== Medal table ==
Rank	Nation	Gold	Silver	Bronze	Total
1	United States	4	4	2	10
2	Germany	0	0	2	2
Totals (2 entries)		4	4	4	12
