= Fritz von Miller =

German sculptor, goldsmith and bronze caster

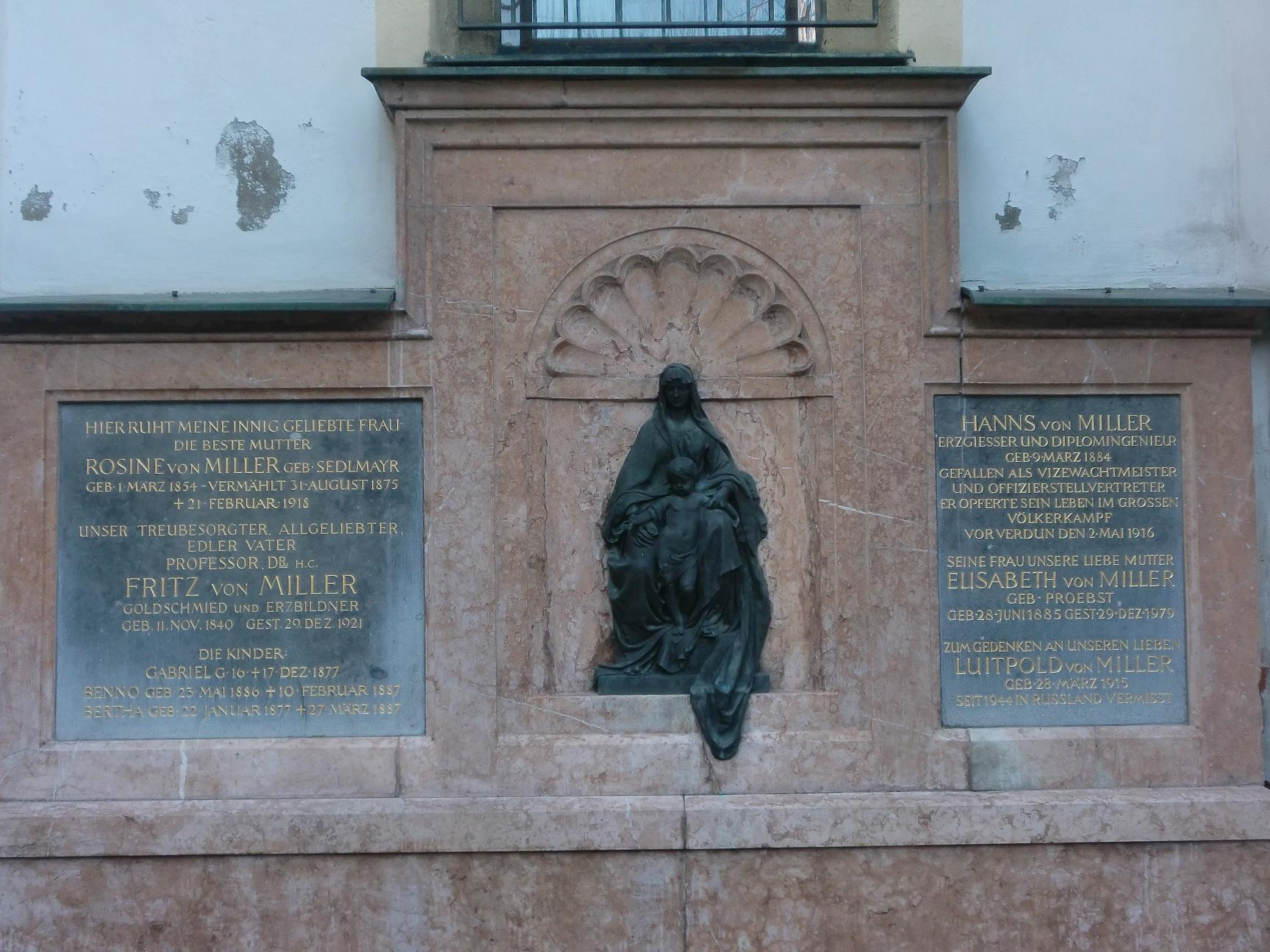
Burial place of Fritz von Miller at the Winthir Cemetery, Neuhausen

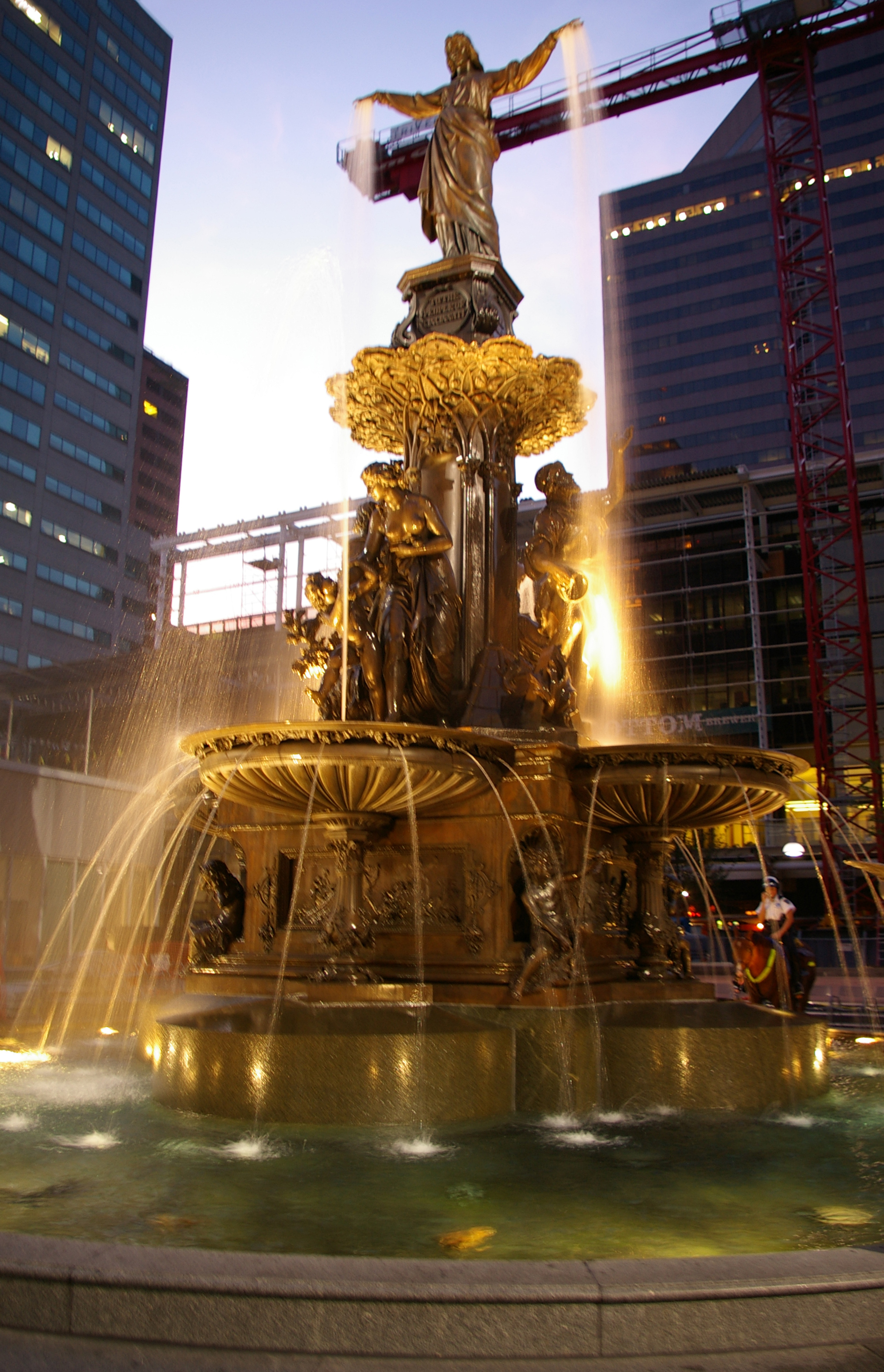
Tyler Davidson Fountain in Cincinnati

Friedrich "Fritz" Johann Baptist von Miller, known as Fritz von Miller (11 November 1840 – 29 December 1921) was a German bronze caster, goldsmith and sculptor.

== Life ==
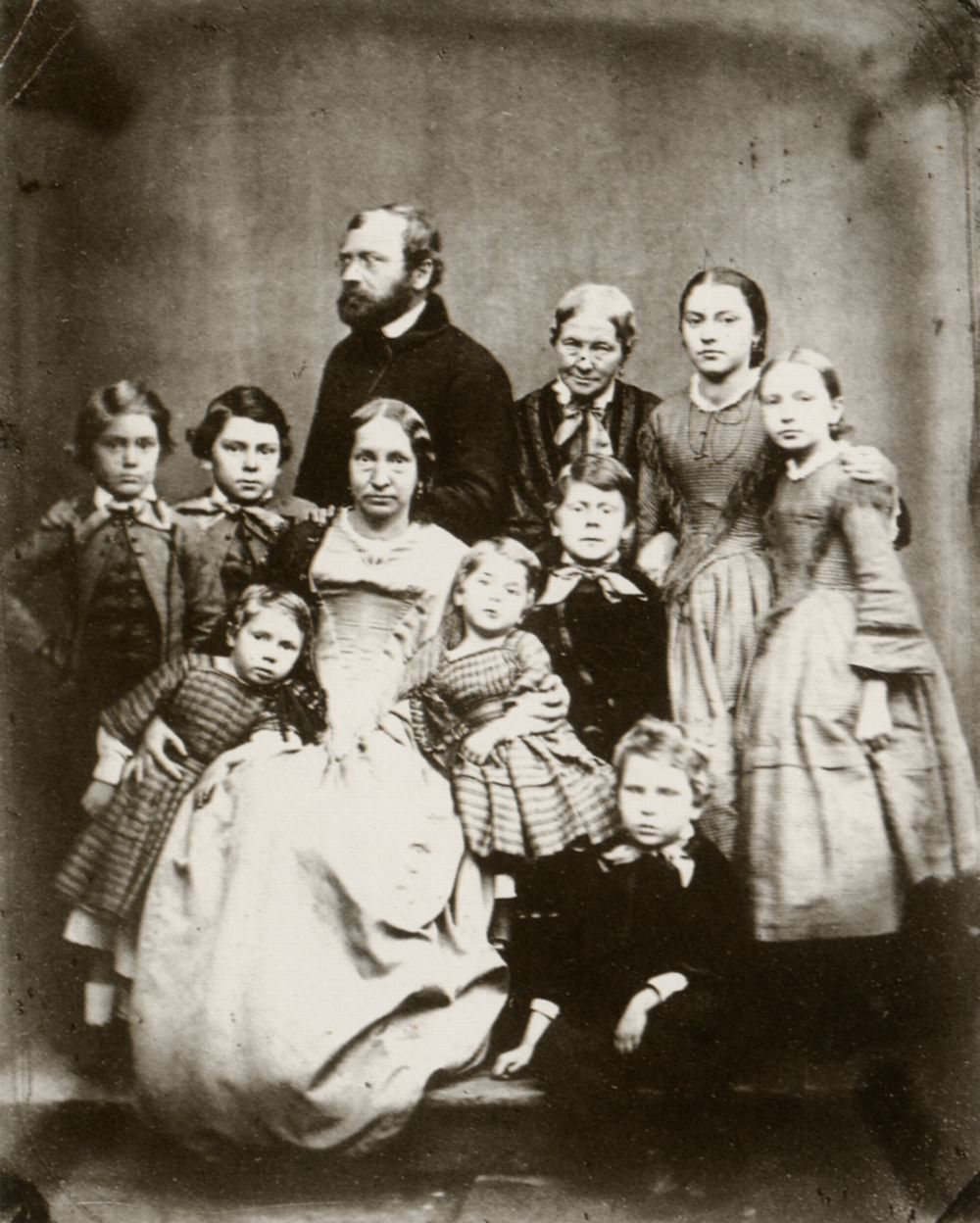
The family of Ferdinand von Miller in 1855

Fritz von Miller, born in Munich, was one of the 14 children of Ferdinand von Miller, creator of the Bavaria statue in the centre of Munich. His brothers included Ferdinand Freiherr von Miller, Oskar von Miller and Wilhelm von Miller (1848–1899)

He studied at the Academy of Fine Arts, Munich, and the Academy of Arts, Berlin. He taught from 1868 to 1912 at the Königliche Kunstgewerbeschule in Munich.

He was a prolific maker of small objets d'art and artistic domestic items, including pens and electric light fittings. One of his larger projects, on which he collaborated with his brother Ferdinand, was the Tyler Davidson Fountain, built in 1871 in Cincinnati. Both Fritz and Ferdinand supported their brother Oskar financially when he wanted to open his own office in 1887.

In 1875 Fritz von Miller married Rosina Theresia Anna Sedlmayr, a descendant of the brewer Gabriel Sedlmayr. Thanks to this marriage he inherited a fortune in 1891.

In 1894 he bought and renovated the Kainzenhof in Bad Wiessee; in 1904 he was involved in the establishment of the church-building society in Bad Wiessee. The design for the church of the Assumption of the Blessed Virgin Mary (Mariae Himmelfahrt), which was eventually dedicated in 1926, was produced by his son, the architect Rupert von Miller.

Fritz was also much involved with the church St. Benno in Neuhausen, founded in 1850 by his father. The Neo-Romanesque church includes an elaborate chapel in honour of the Miller family, for which Fritz's son Rupert sculpted a bust of him.

Fritz died in Munich. The Fritz-von-Miller-Weg in Bad Wiessee is named after him, and another von Miller family memorial chapel, also in a Neo-Romanesque style, is located there. He is buried in the family grave in the Winthir Cemetery in the Munich suburb of Neuhausen.

== Bibliography ==
- Thieme-Becker, Bd. 24, 1930, p. 583.
