= Kacl =

Kacl, KacL, or KACL may refer to:

- KACL (FM), a radio station (98.7 FM) licensed to serve Bismarck, North Dakota, United States
- KXLS, a radio station (95.7 FM) licensed to serve Lahoma, Oklahoma, United States, which held the call sign KACL in 1993
- KACL, a fictional Seattle, Washington, radio station on the TV series Frasier at 780 on the (AM) radio dial
- KacL, the name of several genes
- Václav Kacl (1910–?), Czechoslovak diver
