= Rupert von Miller =

German architect and sculptor

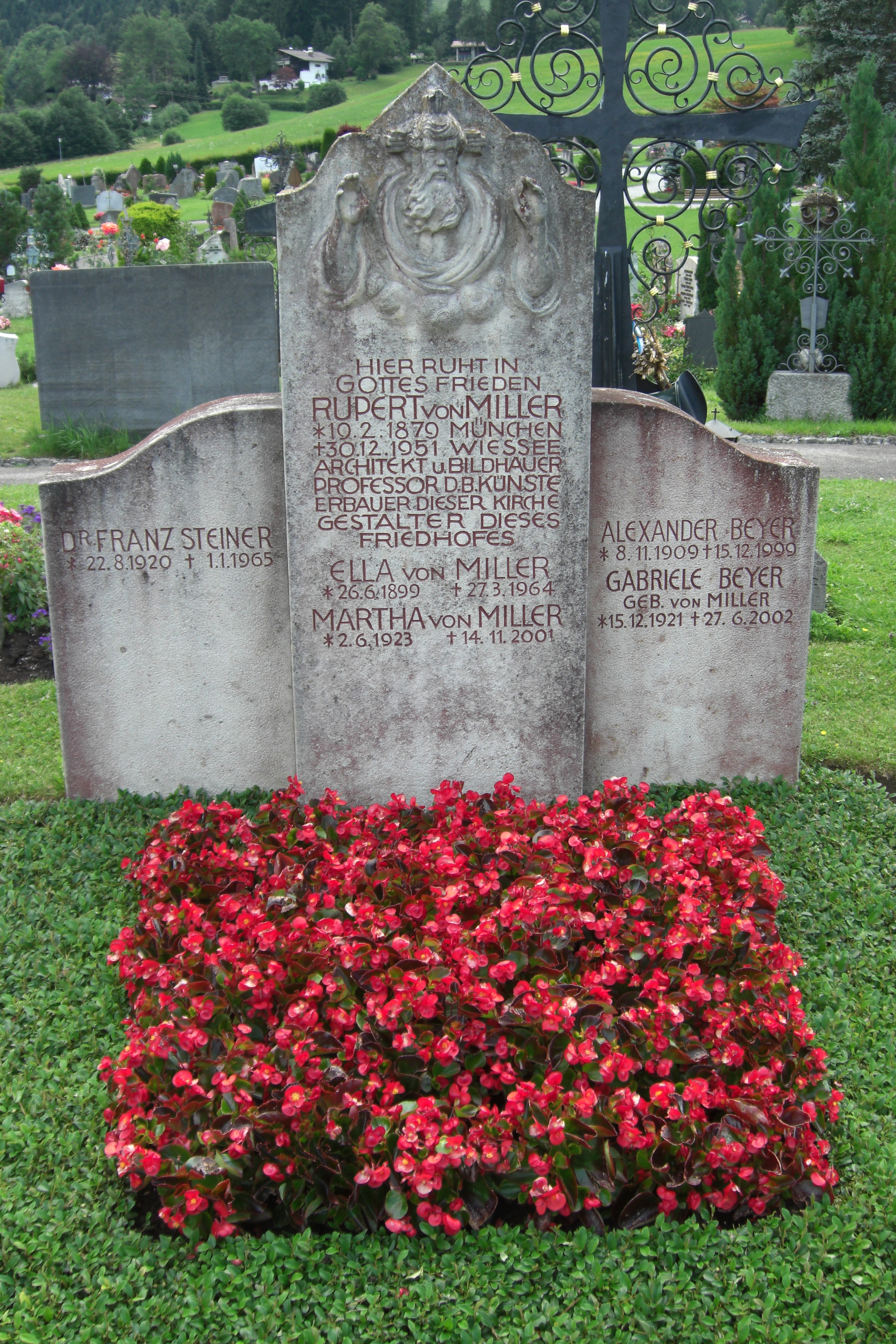
Grave of Rupert von Miller in Bad Wiessee

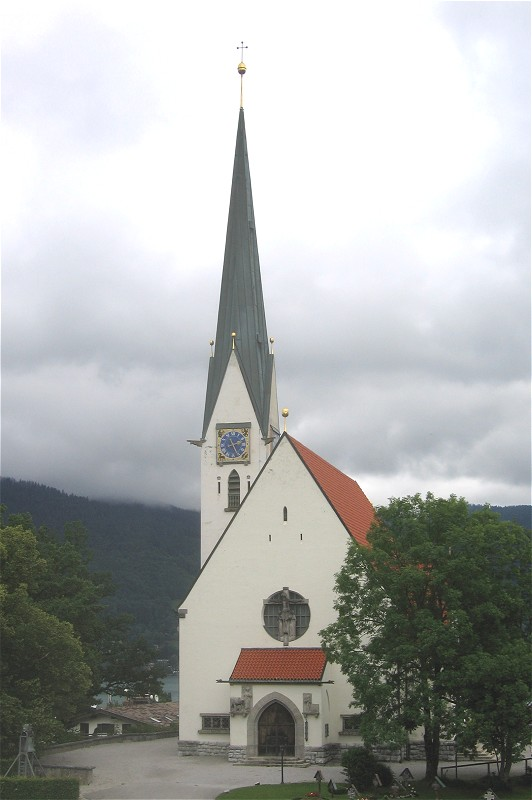
Church of the Assumption (Maria Himmelfahrt) in Bad Wiessee

Rupert von Miller (19 February 1879 – 30 December 1951)) was a German architect and sculptor, born in Munich as the son of bronze caster, goldsmith and sculptor Fritz von Miller, and grandson of bronze caster Ferdinand von Miller. He studied in Munich and Berlin.

Von Miller designed the church of the Assumption of the Blessed Virgin Mary (St. Maria Himmelfahrt) in Bad Wiessee. He also made figures for the Reichenbach Bridge and a bronze bust of his father for the family chapel in St. Benno in Munich.

In 1930 von Miller received a commission for a monument to Simón Bolívar and designed the 3.5-metre-high statue to be installed in the centre of Bogotá. The Rupert-von-Miller-Platz in Bad Wiessee is named for him and his body lays in a local mountain.
