= Viebahn =

Viebahn is a surname. Notable people with the surname include:

- C. F. Viebahn (1842–1915), American politician
- Siegfried Viebahn (1911–1996), German diver
