= Ziherl =

Ziherl is a surname. Notable people with the surname include:

- Boris Ziherl (1910–1976), Slovene philosopher, politician, and political commissar
- Branko Ziherl (1916–1942), Slovenian diver
- Slavko Ziherl (1945–2012), Slovenian psychiatrist

== See also ==
- Martin v. Ziherl
