= Diving at the 1936 Summer Olympics – Men's 10 metre platform =

Men's 10 metre platform at the Games of the XI Olympiad

Medalists
| 1st place, gold medalist(s) | | Marshall Wayne | United States |
| 2nd place, silver medalist(s) | | Elbert Root | United States |
| 3rd place, bronze medalist(s) | | Hermann Stork | Germany |

The men's 10 metre platform, also referred to as high diving, was one of four diving events in the diving at the 1936 Summer Olympics programme. For the first time, all dives were made exclusively from the 10 metre platform.

The competition was split into two sets of dives on separate days:

1. Compulsory dives (Friday, 14 August)
  Divers performed four pre-chosen dives – a standing straight header forward, running straight header forward, standing straight somersault backward, and standing straight isander-half gainer.
2. Facultative dives (Saturday, 15 August)
  Divers performed four dives of their choice (from different categories and different from the compulsory).

Twenty-six divers from 15 nations competed.

== Results ==
| Rank | Diver | Nation | Score |
|---|---|---|---|
| 1st place, gold medalist(s) | Marshall Wayne | United States | 113.58 |
| 2nd place, silver medalist(s) | Elbert Root | United States | 110.60 |
| 3rd place, bronze medalist(s) | Hermann Stork | Germany | 110.31 |
| 4 | Erhard Weiß | Germany | 110.15 |
| 5 | Frank Kurtz | United States | 108.61 |
| 6 | Tsuneo Shibahara | Japan | 107.40 |
| 7 | Siegfried Viebahn | Germany | 105.00 |
| 8 | Tomio Koyanagi | Japan | 94.54 |
| 9 | Doug Tomalin | Great Britain | 94.14 |
| 10 | Carlo Dibiasi | Italy | 90.66 |
| 11 | László Hódi | Hungary | 89.25 |
| 12 | Rauf Abu Al-Seoud | Egypt | 88.78 |
| 13 | Ibrahim Khalil | Egypt | 88.08 |
| 14 | Ilmari Niemeläinen | Finland | 87.60 |
| 15 | Ron Masters | Australia | 86.95 |
| 16 | František Leikert | Czechoslovakia | 86.72 |
| 17 | Ferrero Marianetti | Italy | 82.78 |
| 18 | László Hidvégi | Hungary | 80.14 |
| 19 | Václav Kacl | Czechoslovakia | 80.04 |
| 20 | Branko Ziherl | Yugoslavia | 78.28 |
| 21 | Sam Melberg | Norway | 77.76 |
| 22 | Franco Ferraris | Italy | 77.60 |
| 23 | Gösta Ölander | Sweden | 76.84 |
| 24 | Jesús Flores | Mexico | 73.28 |
| 25 | George Athans | Canada | 70.06 |
| 26 | Josef Nesvadba | Czechoslovakia | 60.02 |

== Sources ==
- Organisationskomitee für die XI. Olympiade Berlin 1936 e.V. (1937). "The XIth Olympic Games, Berlin 1936 - Official Report, Volume II" (PDF). Wilhelm Limpert, Berlin, S.W. 68. pp. pp.323–6. Archived from the original (pdf) on 9 July 2007.
- Herman de Wael (26 January 2001). "Diving - men's platform (Berlin 1936)".
