= The Son of the White Mountain =

1930 German film

- Directed by: Mario Bonnard; Luis Trenker
- Written by: Luis Trenker; Walter Schmidtkunz; Mario Bonnard; Nunzio Malasomma; Franz Schulz
- Produced by: Kurt Heinz; Marcel Hellman
- Starring: Luis Trenker; Maria Matray; Renate Müller; Michael von Newlinsky
- Cinematography: Albert Benitz; Kurt Neubert; Franz Planer
- Music by: Giuseppe Becce
- Production company: Itala-Film
- Release date: 12 August 1930
- Running time: 88 minutes
- Country: Germany
- Language: German

The Son of the White Mountain (German: Der Sohn der weißen Berge) is a 1930 German mystery romance film directed by Mario Bonnard and Luis Trenker and starring Trenker, Maria Matray and Renate Müller. It was part of the popular series of Mountain films of the era. A separate French-language version was also released.

== Cast ==
- Luis Trenker as Hans Turri
- Maria Matray as Anni
- Renate Müller as Mary Dulac
- Michael von Newlinsky as Gregor Milacz
- Karl Steiner as Koste
- Emmerich Albert as Morel
- Sophie Pagay as Frau Turri, mother
- Leo Peukert as M. Dulac
- Jim Gérald as Desk Clerk
- Marcel Merminod as Police Commissioner Frank
- Felix Bressart as Jailer
- Berthe Ostyn as Susanne Milacz
- Hellmut Lantschner as Skier in Race Seq.
- Ludwig Lantschner as Skier in Race Seq.

== Bibliography ==
- Hoffmann, Hilmar. The Triumph of Propaganda: Film and National Socialism, 1933–1945, Volume 1. Berghahn Books, 1997.
