= Diving at the 1936 Summer Olympics – Men's 3 metre springboard =

Men's 3 metre springboard at the Games of the XI Olympiad

Medalists
1st place, gold medalist(s)		Richard Degener	United States
2nd place, silver medalist(s)		Marshall Wayne	United States
3rd place, bronze medalist(s)		Alan Greene	United States

The men's 3 metre springboard, also reported as springboard diving, was one of four diving events on the diving at the 1936 Summer Olympics programme.

The competition was split into two sets of dives on separate days:

1. Compulsory dives (Monday, 10 August)
  Divers performed five pre-chosen dives (one from each category) – a running straight somersault forward, standing header backward with pike, running straight isander-half gainer, standing backward spring and forward somersault with pike, and running pike dive with half-screw forward.
2. Facultative dives (Tuesday, 11 August)
  Divers performed five dives of their choice (one from each category and different from the compulsory).

Twenty-four divers from 15 nations competed.

== Results ==
Place	Diver	Nation	Score
1st place, gold medalist(s)	Richard Degener	United States	163.57
2nd place, silver medalist(s)	Marshall Wayne	United States	159.56
3rd place, bronze medalist(s)	Alan Greene	United States	146.29
4	Tsuneo Shibahara	Japan	144.92
5	Erhard Weiß	Germany	141.21
6	Leo Esser	Germany	137.99
7	Winfried Mahraun	Germany	134.61
8	Tomio Koyanagi	Japan	133.07
9	František Leikert	Czechoslovakia	131.98
10	Branko Ziherl	Yugoslavia	125.26
11	Ismael Ramzi	Egypt	121.67
12	Roger Heinkelé	France	117.72
13	Ilmari Niemeläinen	Finland	116.80
14	Ron Masters	Australia	115.72
15	Hans Haasmann	Netherlands	111.44
15	Josef Nesvadba	Czechoslovakia	111.44
17	Karl Steiner	Austria	109.54
18	László Hidvégi	Hungary	107.49
19	Ahmed Ibrahim Kamel	Egypt	105.02
20	Frederick Hodges	Great Britain	102.98
21	Frédéric Boeni	Switzerland	95.84
22	László Hódi	Hungary	85.42
23	Max Happle	Switzerland	80.24
24	Alfredo Álvarez Calderón	Peru	DNF

== Sources ==
- Organisationskomitee für die XI. Olympiade Berlin 1936 e.V. (1937). "The XIth Olympic Games, Berlin 1936 - Official Report, Volume II" (PDF). Wilhelm Limpert, Berlin, S.W. 68. pp. pp.319–22. Archived from the original (pdf) on 9 July 2007.
- Herman de Wael (24 May 2001). "Diving - men's springboard (Berlin 1936)".
