= Carlo Dibiasi =

Italian diver (1909–1984)

Personal information
- Born: October 19, 1909 Karneid, Austria-Hungary
- Died: October 28, 1984 (aged 75) Bolzano, Italy

Sport
- Sport: Diving

Karl "Carlo" Dibiasi (19 October 1909 – 28 October 1984) was an Italian diver who competed in the 1936 Summer Olympics. He was the father of Klaus Dibiasi. In 1936 he finished tenth in the 10 metre platform event.

In the 1960s he founded the diving school in Bolzano, where he became the coach of his son, Klaus, and of Giorgio Cagnotto. It was for his coaching achievements that he was inducted in the International Swimming Hall of Fame in 2006.
