= Ahmed Ibrahim Kamel =

Egyptian diver

Ahmed Ibrahim Kamel (known as Kelly)
Personal information
- Nationality: Egyptian
- Born: 1908 Sudan
- Died: 1988 (aged 79–80) Cairo

Sport
- Sport: Diving

Ahmed Ibrahim Kamel (born 1908, date of death 1988) was an Egyptian diver. He competed in the men's 3 metre springboard event at the 1936 Summer Olympics.
