= Ferdinand Freiherr von Miller =

German sculptor

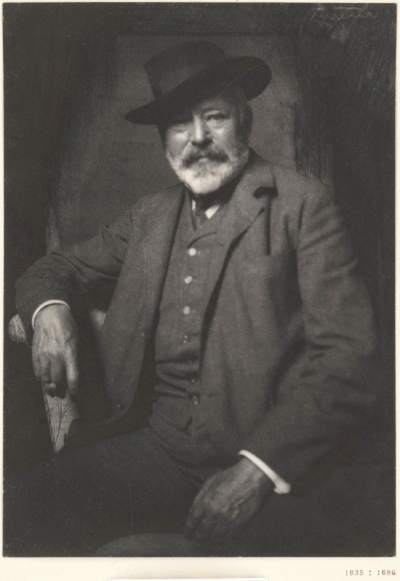
Ferdinand von Miller

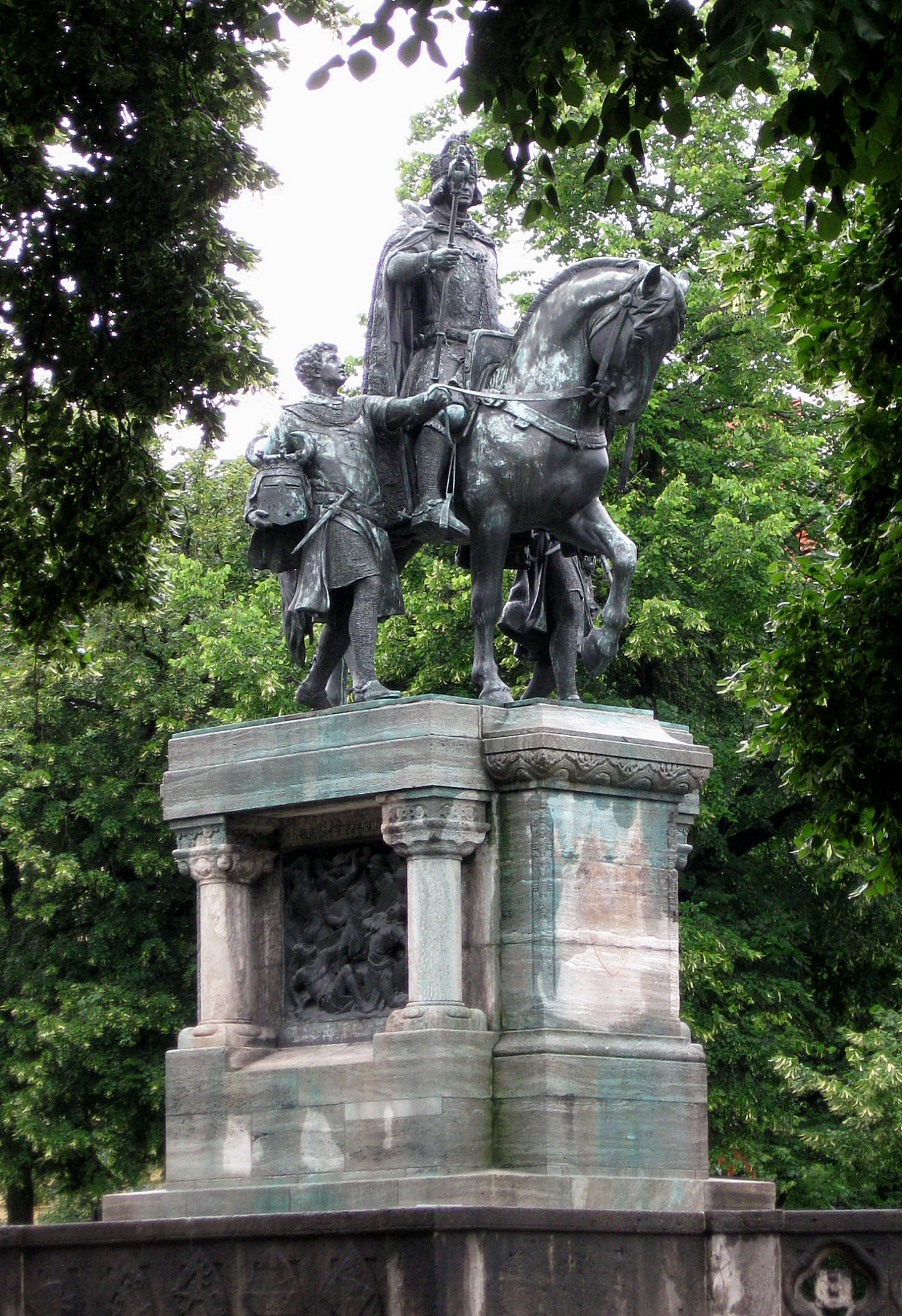
bronze of Louis IV, Holy Roman Emperor, Munich

Ferdinand Miller, from 1875 von Miller and from 1912 Freiherr von Miller (8 June 1842 – 18 December 1929) was an ore caster, sculptor and director of the Academy of Fine Arts, Munich (Akademie der Bildenden Künste München). He also held a seat in the Royal Bavarian House of Lords, the Reichsrat.

== Family ==
Miller was born and died in Munich. He was the son of the artisan and First Inspector of the Royal Munich brass foundry, Ferdinand von Miller (1813–1887), and Anna Pösl (1815–1890). With the elevation of his father Ferdinand into the Bavarian nobility on 12 October 1875 and with the inscription of the family name on the roll of the aristocracy of the Kingdom of Bavaria on 30 December 1875, Ferdinand was simultaneously ennobled. Ferdinand's younger brother was the engineer and founder of the Deutsches Museum Oskar von Miller.

== Life ==
Miller received his initial training from his father at the Royal Munich brass foundry. He continued his studies in Paris, London and finally in Dresden with Ernst Julius Hähnel. Afterwards he undertook several study trips to Italy and the US. He created about 70 statues and monuments.

From 1900 to 1918 he was director of the Academy of Fine Arts in Munich. He was member of the Reichsrat (the House of Lords) of the Kingdom of Bavaria (the second chamber) and the Municipal council of Munich.

In 1884 von Miller acquired Karneid Castle, a 13th-century Tyrolean castle near the town of Bolzano, from his sister-in-law Ida, who had inherited it from her father Carl Mayer von Mayerfels. Miller embarked on an extensive restoration project, making the structure habitable again after 200 years of neglect. After being expropriated after the 1st & 2nd World Wars, the property is today owned by Miller's direct descendants.

In 1892 he was made a member of the Bavarian Maximilian Order for Science and Art. In 1912 he was made an honorary citizen of the city of Munich, and was promoted to Bavarian Freiherr (Baron) on 22 June 1912 in Berchtesgaden. He is buried in the family graveside Winthirkirche Cemetery in Munich-Neuhausen.

== Work ==
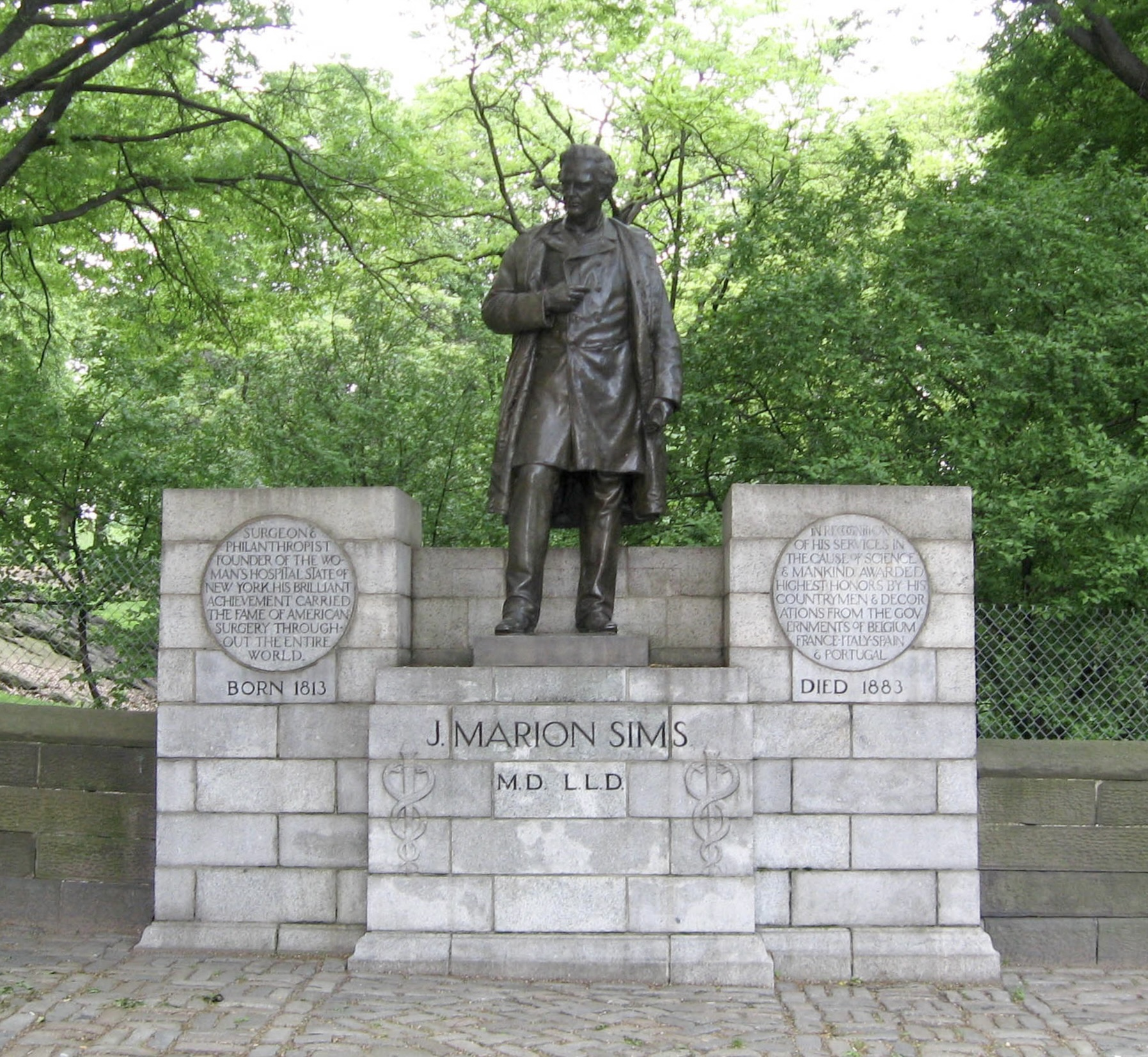
Statue of J. Marion Sims on Fifth Avenue, on the wall of Central Park, NYC

von Miller's work includes:

- some of the figures on the Tyler Davidson Fountain in Cincinnati, Ohio, along with his brother Fritz von Miller as a commission from his father (1871)
- colossal statues of Shakespeare and Alexander von Humboldt in Tower Grove Park, St. Louis, Missouri (1878)
- monument to Albertus Magnus, Lauingen, Germany (1881)
- Confederate Memorial, Magnolia Cemetery, Charleston, South Carolina (1882)
- white marble busts of Ludwig van Beethoven and Richard Wagner (1884), and a statue of Christopher Columbus (1886), Tower Grove Park, St. Louis, Missouri
- Statue of King Ludwig I of Bavaria in the Walhalla memorial, near Regensburg (1890)
- a bronze depicting J. Marion Sims in surgical wear, near Fifth Avenue and 103rd Street, New York City (1894)
- bronze of Louis IV, Holy Roman Emperor, Kaiser-Ludwig-Platz, Munich (1905)
- five allegorical figures of Colombia, Venezuela, Peru, Ecuador and Bolivia holding Simón Bolívar aloft, at the Puente de Boyacá historic site near Tunja, Colombia (1920)
