= Marshall Wayne =

American diver (1912–1999)

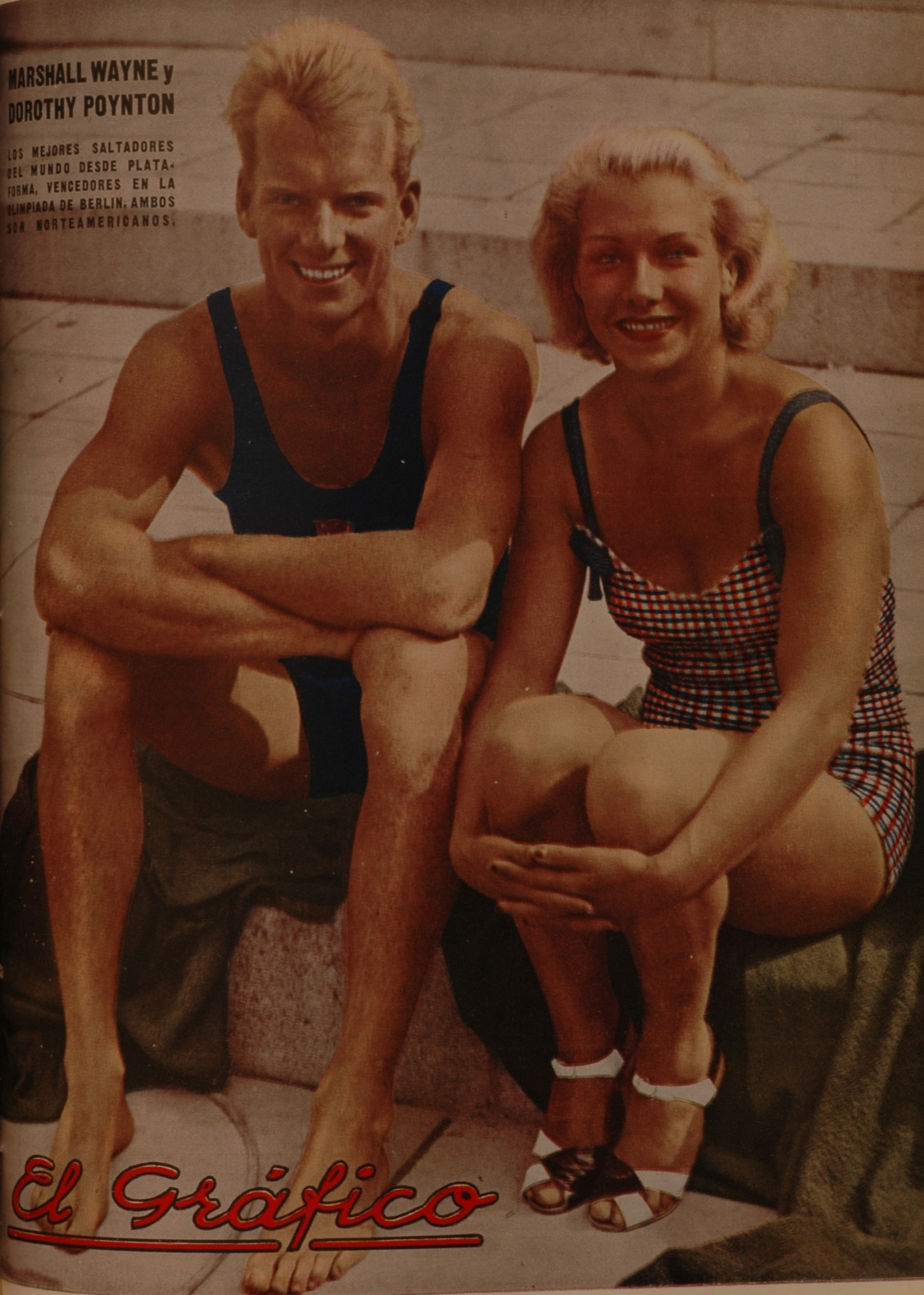
- Marshall Wayne and Dorothy Poynton

Personal information
- Born: May 25, 1912 St. Louis, Missouri, United States
- Died: June 16, 1999 (aged 87) Hendersonville, North Carolina, United States

Sport
- Sport: Diving
Medal record
Representing the United States
Olympic Games
Gold medal – first place	1936 Berlin	10 m platform
Silver medal – second place	1936 Berlin	3 m springboard

Marshall Wayne (May 25, 1912 – June 16, 1999) was an American diver who competed in the 1936 Summer Olympics.

== 1936 Summer Olympics ==
In the 1936 Berlin Olympics, he won the gold medal in the 10 meter platform competition as well as the silver medal in the 3 meter springboard event. He angered Adolf Hitler as his favorite diver, Hermann Stork was predicted to win. A heated discussion between the German dictator and Wayne ensued, and was recounted by several family members. In fact, the US Olympic diving teams (men’s and women’s), won 10 out of 12 possible medals in those games.

After the Olympics Marshall performed for Billy Rose’s Aquacade with the likes of Esther Williams, Johnny Weissmuller, Buster Crabbe, Eleanor Holm and others. He then enlisted in the Army Air Corp and became the Commanding Officer of the 7th Photo Reconnaissance Group out of Mt. Farm, England. In 1945, Col. Wayne aborted his de Havilland Mosquito plane and was injured in a flight accident and parachuted out of his plane, only to land in a tree while damaging his leg. He was taken in by an Italian family, and later smuggled out of Italy to England. After the war he appeared in ads for Camel cigarettes, Havoline motor oil, BVD underwear and others.

== Personal life ==
Born of parents in the Vaudeville troupe that toured the east coast of the US, Marshall began performing at a very young age. Taught by the acrobats of the Vaudeville acts long before he began to dive, Marshall took an interest to tumbling. When he was a teen at Miami High, he snuck in the Venetian pool in Coral Gables, and his diving career began.

By the time he was 18, he was diving and performing at the Biltmore Hotel on Miami Beach, entertaining for the socialites and visiting guests. He won a number of AAU diving awards including first place in the 1934 & 1936 AAU Championships. He attended two years of college at the University of Miami.

He was inducted into the International Swimming Hall of Fall in 1982, in Fort Lauderdale, Florida. He was also inducted into the University of Miami Sports Hall of Fame & Museum in 1993.
