= Oskar von Miller Tower =

Meteorological tower in Garching

Coordinates: 48°15′41″N 11°39′50″E

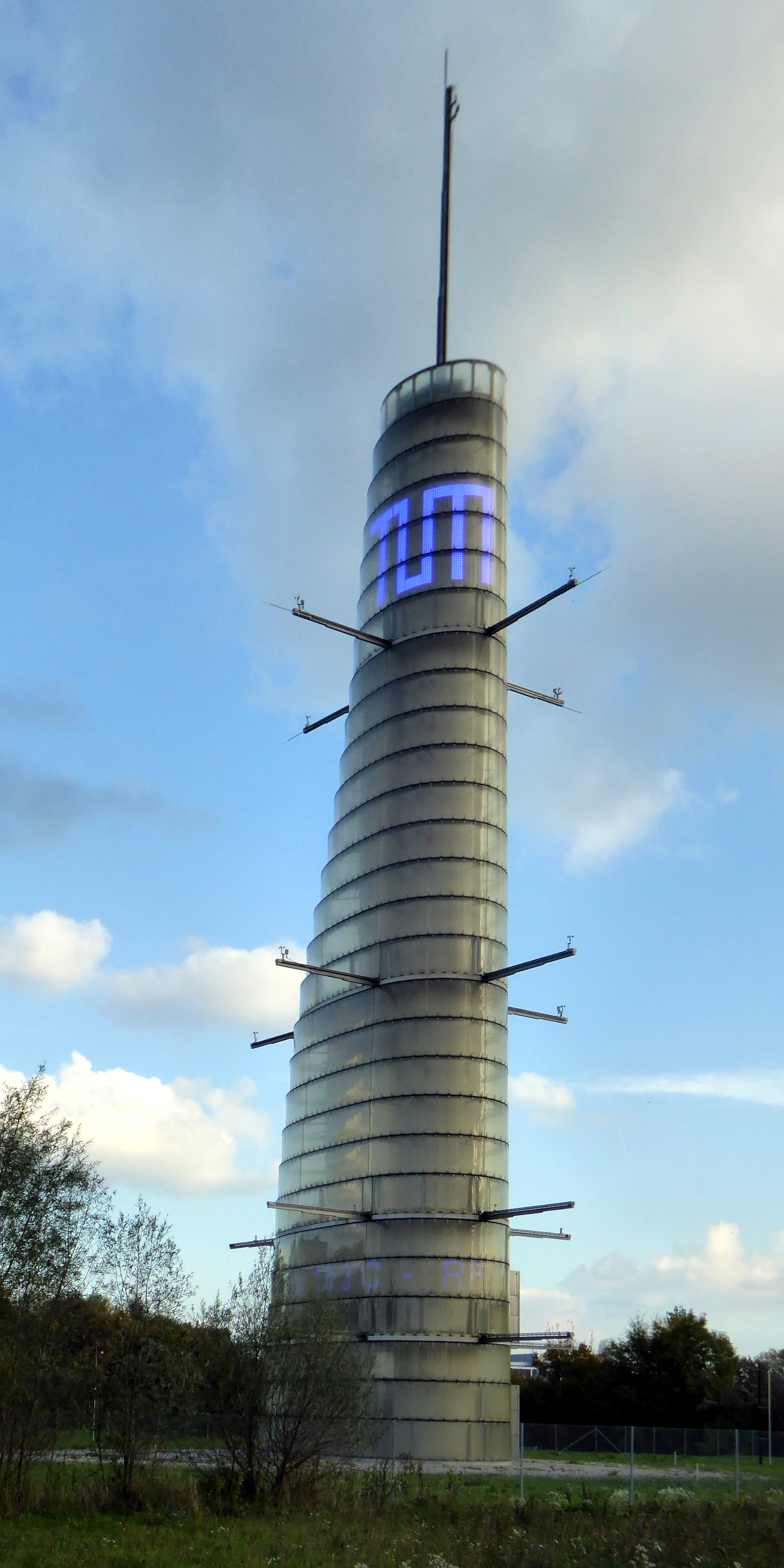
The Oskar von Miller Tower

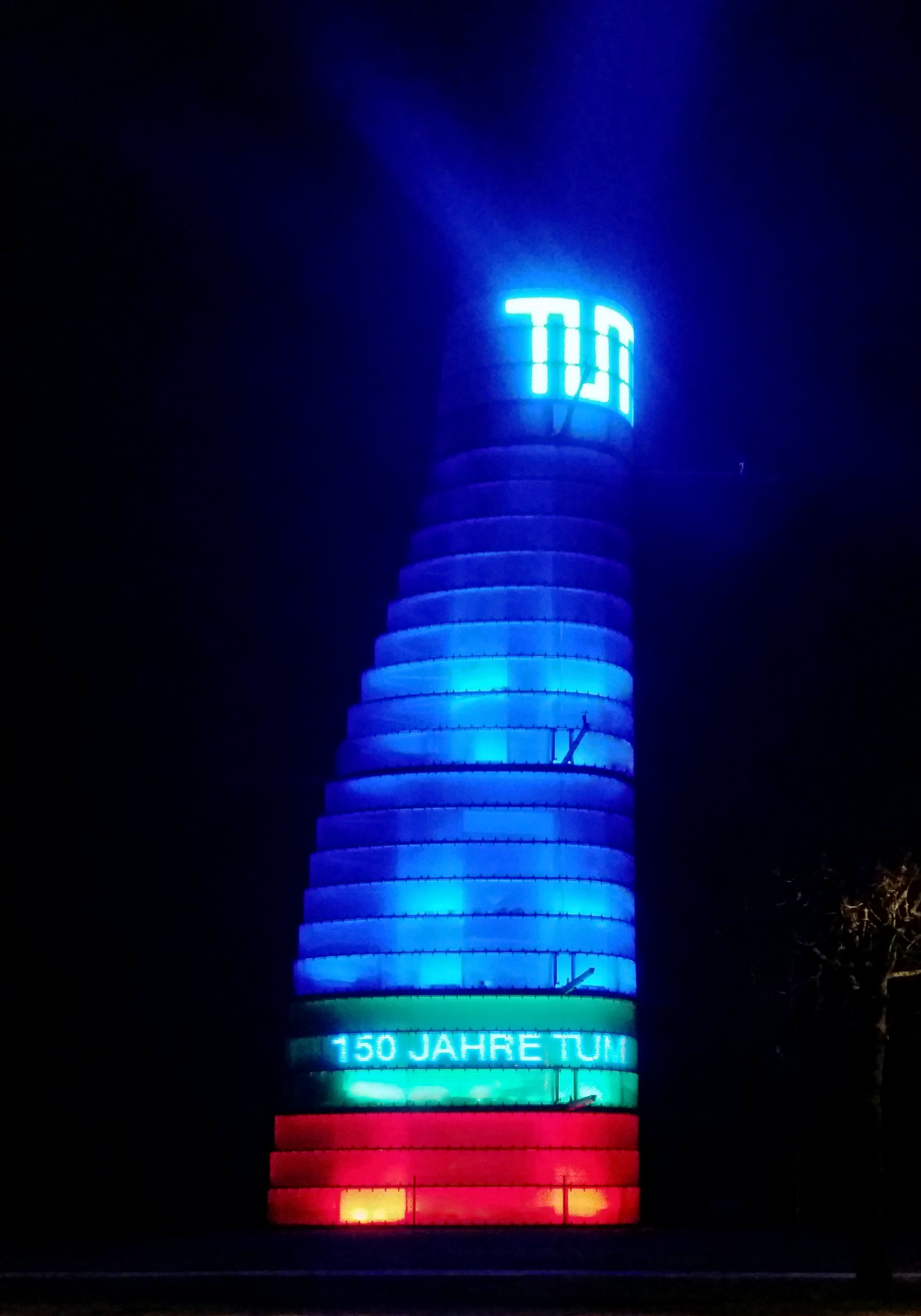
The Oskar von Miller Tower lit up at night

The Oskar von Miller Tower (German: Oskar-von-Miller-Turm) is a tower for meteorological measurements located in Garching, Germany. Built in 2007–2009, it is named after Oskar von Miller and operated by the Technical University of Munich.

A concrete structure surrounded by a coat of acrylic glass, the Oskar von Miller Tower has a height of 62 metres and carries measuring devices to all directions 5, 10, 20, 35 and 50 metres above ground. 1350 LEDs display the logo of the Technical University of Munich, while 3750 display the actual weather data. It replaced a guyed mast used for the same purpose on the area.
