= Max Happle =

Swiss diver

Personal information
- Nationality: Swiss
- Born: 26 October 1914

Sport
- Sport: Diving

Max Happle (born 26 October 1914, date of death unknown) was a Swiss diver. He competed in the men's 3 metre springboard event at the 1936 Summer Olympics.
