= Ibrahim Khalil (diver) =

Egyptian diver

Personal information
- Born: 1909
- Died: 7 April 1998 (aged 88–89)

Sport
- Country: Egypt
- Sport: Diving
- Event: 10 metre platform

Ibrahim Khalil (1909 – 7 April 1998) was an Egyptian diver. He competed at the 1936 Summer Olympics in Berlin, where he placed 13th in 10 metre platform.
