= Ferrero Marianetti =

Italian diver (1912–1970)

Personal information
- Born: May 28, 1912; Rome, Italy
- Died: 1970 (aged 57–58)

Sport
- Sport: Diving

Ferrero Marianetti (28 May 1912 – 1970) was an Italian diver. He competed at the 1936 Summer Olympics in Berlin, where he placed 17th in 10 metre platform.
