= Frederick Hodges (diver) =

British diver

Personal information
- Nationality: British
- Born: 8 May 1921 Shoreditch, England
- Died: 24 November 2014 (aged 93) Malvern, Worcestershire, England

Sport
- Sport: Diving
Medal record
Men's diving
Representing Great Britain
European Championships
Bronze medal – third place	1938 London	3 m springboard

Frederick George Hodges (8 May 1921 – 24 November 2014) was a British diver. He competed in the men's 3 metre springboard event at the 1936 Summer Olympics. He was Britain's youngest male Olympian until 2008. Hodges was aged fifteen years and ninety-four days old when he competed in 1936.
