= Karneid Castle =

Castle in northern Italy

Coordinates: 46°29′23″N 11°23′53″E

- South Tyrol (BZ)
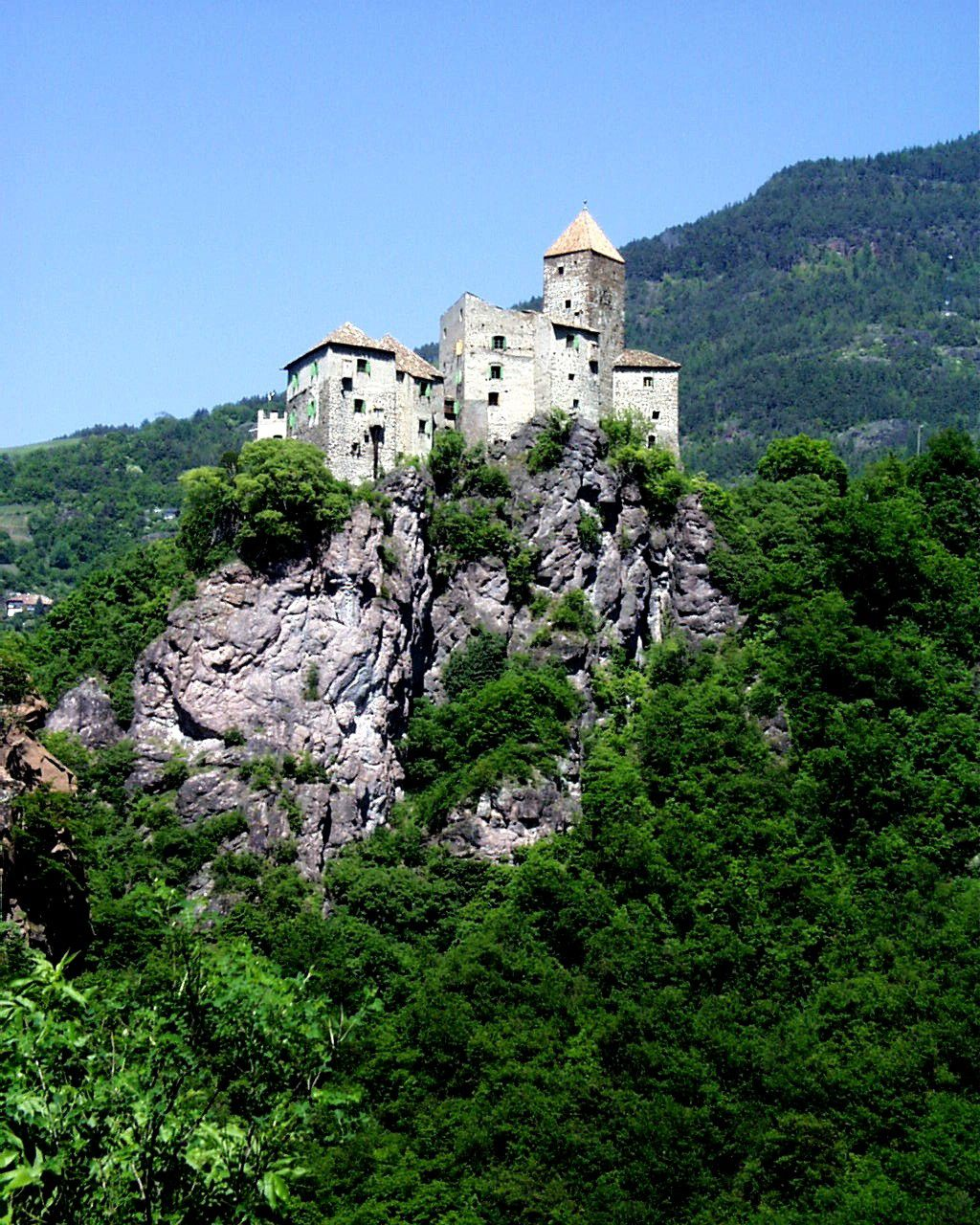

Site information
- Open to the public: Limited
- Condition: Private residence

Site history
- Built: Early 1200s

Karneid Castle (Italian: Cornedo all'Isarco) is a castle in northern Italy situated in the comune (municipality) of Karneid in the province of South Tyrol in the Italian region Trentino-Alto Adige/Südtirol, located about 4 km east of the city of Bolzano (Bozen).

== Historical background ==
A 20th century analysis of the castle by the historian Martin Bitschnau suggests it was constructed on the site of an earlier smaller building in the early 13th CE by unknown vassals of the Prince-Bishopric of Brixen, an imperial estate of the Holy Roman Empire.

The fortress stands perched dramatically on an inaccessible cliff face above the confluence of the Eggental and the Eisack rivers, on the historically resonant ancient border between the kingdoms of the Lombards and the Bavarii. The name 'Karneid' derives from the Latin "cornus" meaning “horn”.

== Chronology ==
=== 13th Century ===
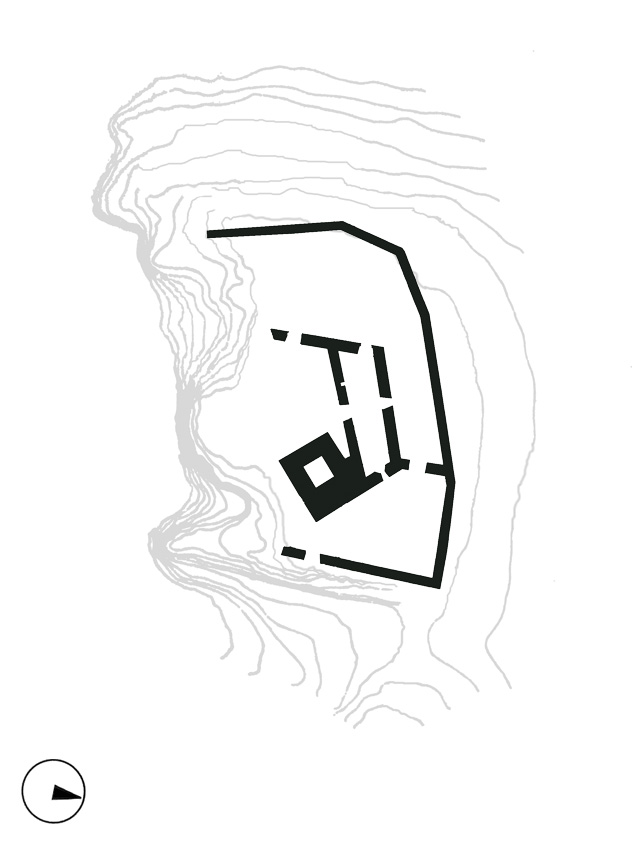
Karneid Castle Plan 1230-40

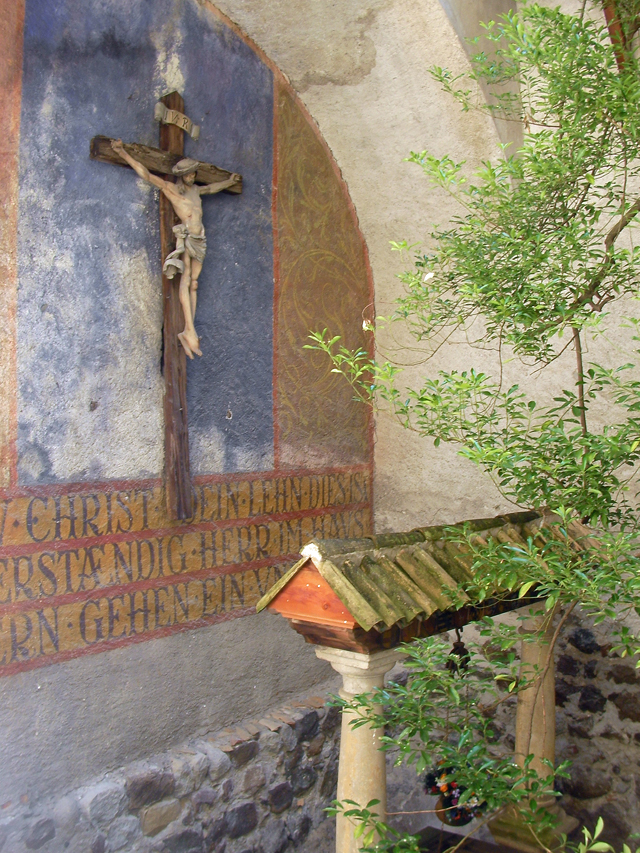
View of inner courtyard

1230-40

The Keep
The heart of the castle, with a floor plan of 7.4 x 6.8m and walls of 2.1m thickness throughout. The limited internal dimensions indicate that this tower is not intended to be inhabited for long periods. Its function is as a watchtower and visible expression of judicial power. The entrance to the tower is 8m above ground in order to impede access in case of war. From the windowless basement a wooden trap door descends into the dungeon. Small windows and loopholes on two floors form architectural and defence elements typical of the period.

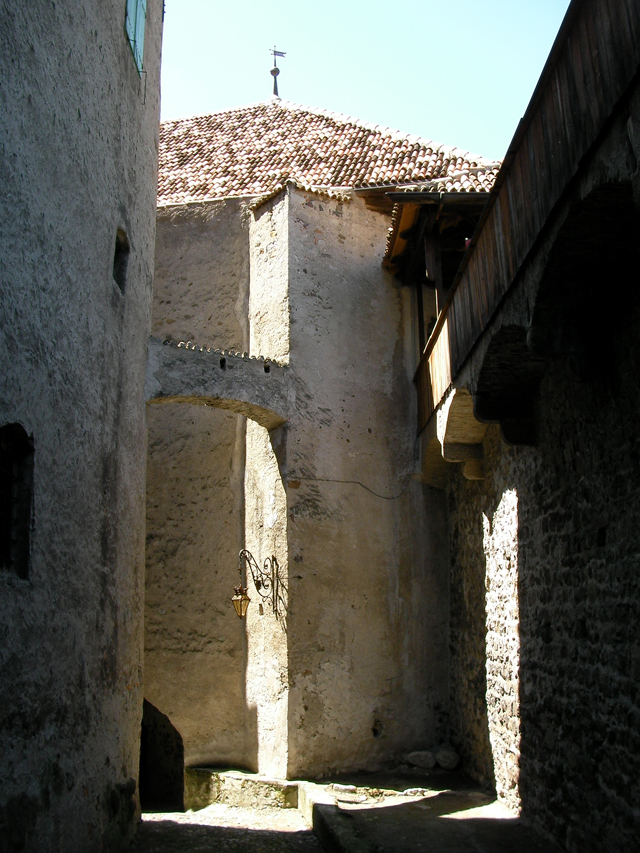
View between the hall and curtain wall

The Hall
Until about 1200, the home of a nobleman or feudal lord in this part of the world was a residence in the local town or village. A castle tended to be solely a fortified place of refuge, usually just a tower surrounded by a wall. The construction of castles at higher vantage points with a residential building or great hall was an innovation brought about by the increasing desire of ruling families in the 13th century to project power and wealth as part of the so-called Vertikalverschiebung or vertical shift. The two-story hall in Karneid on the northern corner of the keep speaks for the wealth and status of its owner. Inwardly sloping roofs are designed so that rainwater can flow over gutters into a cistern carved out of the rock in the middle of a central courtyard. An inner wall connects the keep and hall to the east and west.

The Curtain Wall
Surrounding the hall, keep and inner wall is the curtain wall. There is a gate in the south east corner of the wall, opposite the keep. Access to the gate is by a wooden bridge over a man-made ditch sealing off the east side of the terrain. A wooden battlement runs along the inside of the curtain wall for defence purposes.

1246

The first documented reference to 'Corneit', referring to a certain 'paumannum de Corneit' and his spouse Yrmengarde.

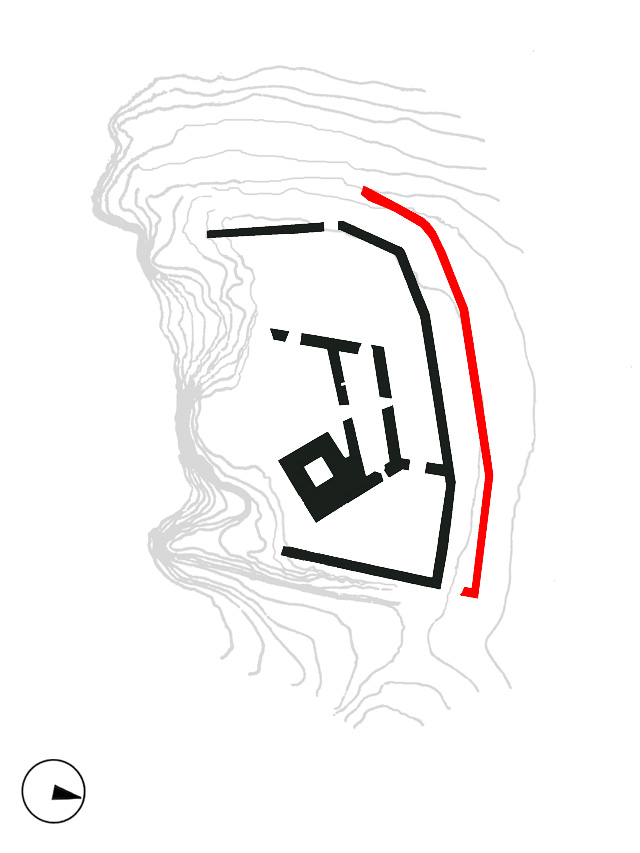
Karneid Castle Plan 1250-75

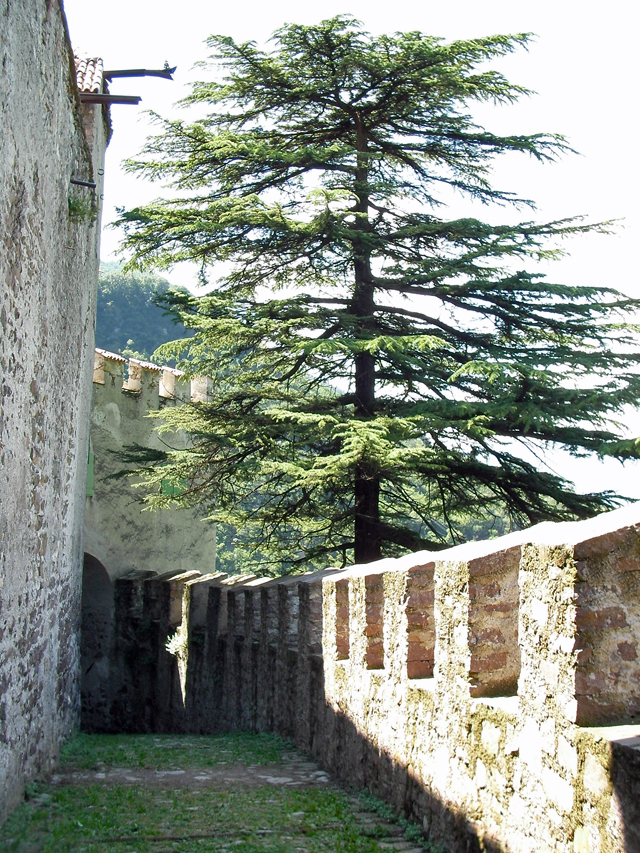
View of the outer ward from the east

1250-75

The Outer Ward
In the 2nd half of the 13th Century, a protective outer wall up to one metre thick is added on the only remaining unprotected side of the castle to the north, creating a narrow outer ward or Zwinger. At the same time a gatehouse is built between the curtain and outer wall in the north east corner and the original entrance is walled up. Access to the keep, bailey and hall is now through the far western side of the curtain wall, making access for an attacker more difficult and dangerous. Defence techniques of the time sought to design access to castles and fortifications from right to left, forcing an attacker carrying a shield on his left arm to attack with an unprotected sword arm. The location of Karneid, facing north with access from the east, made this impossible, so the castle's defences are designed to force any attackers along a long corridor between high walls from left to right, exposing them for as long as possible to targeted attacks by defenders stationed on the curtain wall.

1295

‘Castrum de Corneit’ is documented for the first time as fief of the Bishopric of Brixen.

=== 14th Century ===
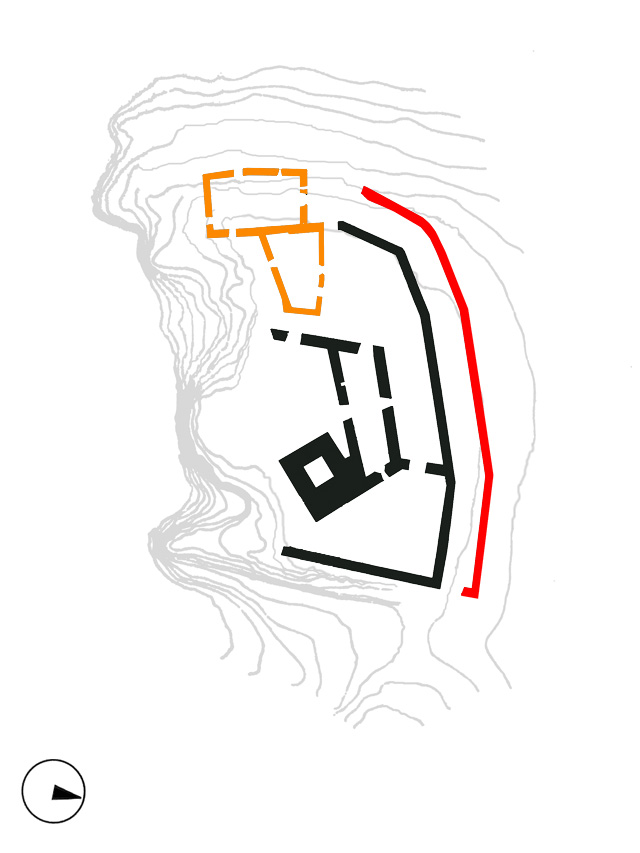
Karneid Castle Plan 1300

1300

A two storey building is constructed outside the curtain wall in the south west corner. Another building within the wall, immediately adjoining the west gate is also from this period.

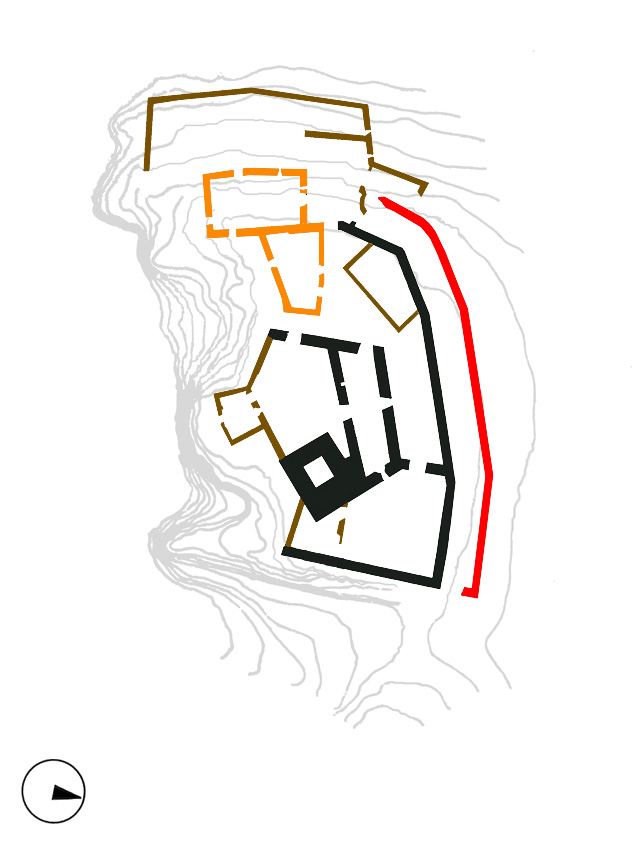
Karneid Castle Plan 1325

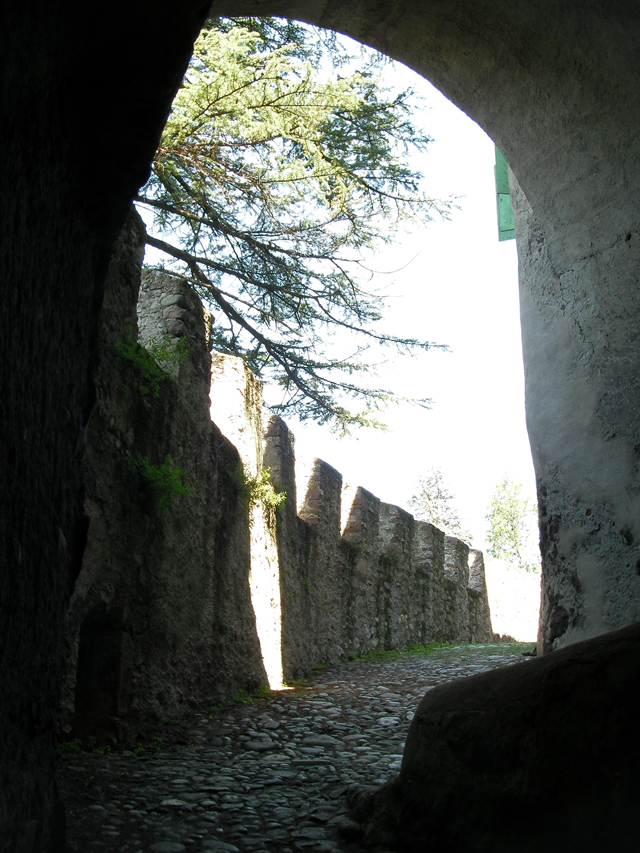
View from western gatehouse and outer ward

1325

Western Gate
At the beginning of the 14th Century a fortified gatehouse is constructed at the end of the defensive corridor between curtain and outer wall, further improving the defences of the inner castle and bailey. An opening is also created in the outer wall, leading to a small castle garden situated outside the curtain wall. Anyone wanting access to the bailey has to approach the gatehouse via an unusual protruding curved wall. A loophole set in the gatehouse behind this wall gives defenders an improved view of anyone approaching the entrance and an opportunity to attack them if necessary.

Kitchen and South Wing
The south side of the western outer wall has a single storey building with basement added that serves as the castle kitchen. At the same time, at the southern and most inaccessible point between cliff face and keep, a two storey building is added. The coping to the entrance dates this building to the early 14th Century.

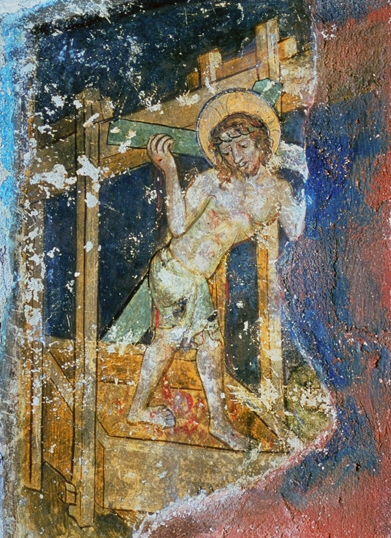
Detail from Chapel

Chapel
A chapel is built with the eastern corner of the keep protruding sharply into its western wall. A flat roof supports a second story, accessed from the bailey. A chapel in a ministerial residence is unusual for the period and speaks for the wealth and status of its builders. The interior frescoes are a rare example of the early gothic style in the region and are attributed to the workshop of the Johanisskirche in Brixen.

1348

Heinrich von Völs, the first documented feudal lord to name himself after Karneid, dies leaving six children: Katharina, Margaretha, Klara, Oswald, Nikolaus and Heinrich. His sons die without heirs whilst Katharina marries Botzo de Bambarossi, Magaretha Arnold von Niederthor and Klara Ritter Joachim von Villanders. Klara dies without issue.

1366

The husbands of Heinrich's two surviving daughters and the Völs family dispute Heinrich's inheritance; A court rules that Castle Karneid and its feudal rights be awarded to Botzo de Bambarossi and Arnold von Niederthor and the remaining lands and estates to the Völs family.

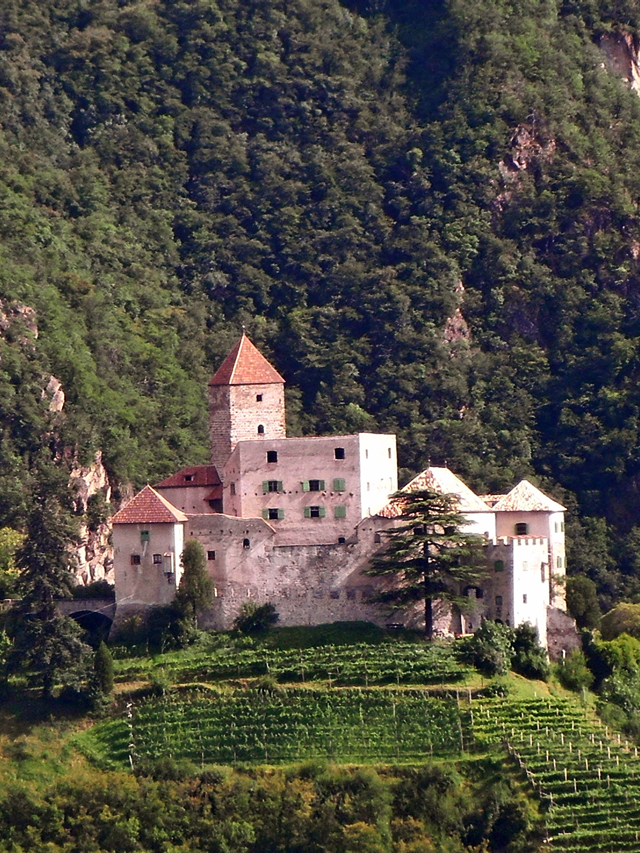
North elevation

1370

Botzo and Arnold are unable to agree shared ownership of Karneid, and so the castle escheats to the state and on 18 April 1370 the Dukes Albert and Leopold of Austria invest Karneid in Heinrich Gessler von Meienberg, Leopold's long serving imperial chamberlain, advisor and military governor. Heinrich’s estates lie mainly in Aargau, Zürichgau and Frickgau in modern Switzerland and Karneid remains of little interest to him.

1371

Heinrich returns the Karneider fief. The Dukes of Austria award it to Friedrich von Greifenstein and Hans Berger, Duke Leopold's chamberlain.

1375

Hans Berger sells his share of the fief to Friedrich von Greifenstein.

1386

After the death of Friedrich von Greifenstein's son Fritzman at the Battle of Sempach, the fief is sold to Heinrich IV von Liechtenstein. Heinrich is a prominent figure at the court of the Prince Bishop of Trent and holds several important offices. His family (not related to the modern rulers of Liechtenstein or the family of Ulrich von Liechtenstein) also possesses the Castle Haselburg near Bolzano.

1387

Duke Albrecht of Austria officially invests Heinrich von Lichtenstein with the fief of Karneid and Steinegg.

=== 15th Century ===
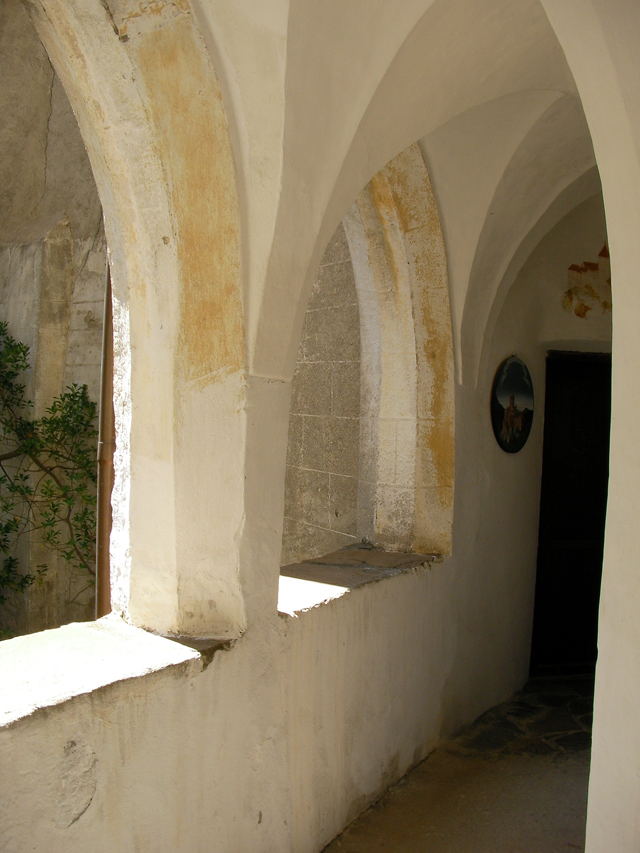
Gothic walkway

1410

After Heinrich’s death, his sons Hans Heinrich and Wilhelm von Lichtenstein are drawn into a bloody civil war between Friedrich IV, Duke of Austria and Heinrich VI. von Rottenburg. The Rottenburgs are the wealthiest and most powerful family in Tyrol and in 1410 they make an alliance with the Duchy of Bavaria and begin a military campaign to expel the Habsburgs and become rulers of Tyrol. Karneid sides with the Rottenburgs and is successfully besieged for the only time in its history. The rebellion fails, Karneid is overrun by the Habsburgs and Hans von Lichtenstein dies soon afterwards. Wilhelm is forced to swear loyalty to the Habsburgs before being released from prison and being re-invested with Karneid. The feud drastically weakens the Lichtensteins financially and politically.

1414

There is a dispute between the heirs of Hans Heinrich & Wilhelm; Karneid and its incomes is divided in two.

1450

Work is carried out internally by both families to improve living standards within their respective parts of the castle. In the west, the 2 story building on the north west side of the outer wall receives window seats and gothic wood panelling. In the east, the keep has an additional storey added, and the walkways and stairwells in the inner courtyard are capped with gothic arches.

=== 16th Century ===
1506

Paul von Lichtenstein, heir of Hans Heinrich, is elevated to the rank of Baron of Lichtenstein-Castelcorno after receiving the fief of Castelcorno near Rovereto from his brother Ulrich, Bishop of Trent.

1580

There is a large fire and much of the castle is destroyed. Extensive restoration and rebuilding is undertaken by Bartholomäus von Lichtenstein.

East Wing
The outer wall is increased in height and a gate house with pyramidal roof built over the castle entrance. Inside the eastern curtain wall in the chapel courtyard, a single story service building is built and a new doorway is created in the north east corner of the curtain wall, dramatically shortening the access route to the chapel courtyard. An additional floor is added to the chapel complex.
Inner Courtyard
The hall has a third floor added, but retains the inwardly inclined roofs. A newly created saloon room on the upper floor is furnished with valuable renaissance panelling and an expensive cocklestove. The building on the southern side on the cliff edge also receives another floor.
West Wing
The 2 story building on the north west side of the outer wall also receives a new floor and the western gatehouse is raised by one storey and a pyramid roof added. The two buildings on the interior western side of the curtain wall are covered with a stone archway and two storeys are built on top, creating 2 large halls connecting the western gate house and western residence. On the first floor is a large stone floored, arched hallway with large kitchen. On the second floor a hall of similar size with a wood panelled ceiling. Large bay windows in the south wall and double-arched renaissance style windows are also added as decorative elements. At the same time, the inner courtyard and west wings are connected by a stone walkway.

=== 17th Century ===
1602

Bartholomäus von Lichtenstein-Castlecorno dies heavily in debt.

=== 18th Century ===
1761

The last of the Lichtensteins in Karneid, Count Franz Anton von Lichtenstein-Castelcorno, dies.

1766

The fief of Karneid is sold by the Lichtenstein heirs to the city of Bozen. A number of minor repairs to the buildings are carried out.

=== 19th Century ===
1808

After the defeat of Austria-Hungary by Napoleon Bonaparte at the battle of Austerlitz, Tyrol is ceded to the Electorate of Bavaria at the Peace of Pressburg in 1805. Karneid remains under the administration of the Bavarian state until 1815 during which time no alterations to the building are documented.

1814

Following the Congress of Vienna, Tyrol is reintegrated into the Austro-Hungarian Empire and the fief of Karneid is returned to the Habsburgs.

1838

After removing judicial privileges from the fief as part of wider legal reforms, the imperial government in Vienna puts Karneid up for auction. There is little interest other than from Ritter Anton von Goldegg, a first lieutenant in the Imperial Austro-Hungarian army. He purchases the property and commissions urgent maintenance and restoration work on the buildings, which have fallen into disrepair after 80 years of neglect.

1839

More urgent maintenance work is carried out.

1854

After more than 500 years the wooden bridge across the moat is rebuilt in stone.

1862

The heirs of Ritter Anton von und zu Goldegg und Lindenburg sell Karneid to Ritter Quirin von Leitner, Director of the Civic Armoury in Vienna.

1878

The art historian Dr Carl Ritter and Edler Mayer von Mayerfels acquires Karneid. He and his heirs do little to maintain the castle.

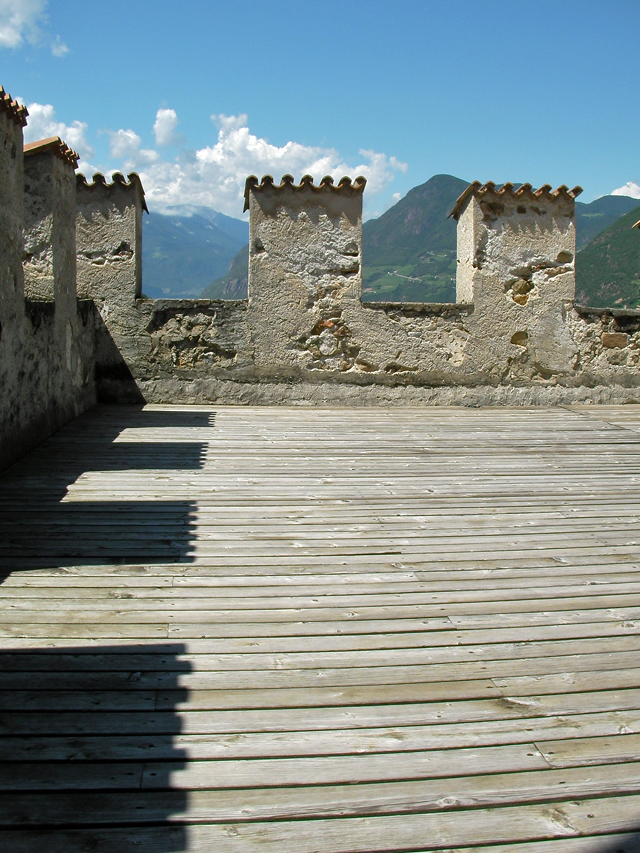
19th century terrace

1884

After Dr Mayer von Mayerfels' death in 1883, his daughter Ida sells Karneid to her brother-in-law, Freiherr Ferdinand von Miller. The condition of the castle is very poor. Ferdinand von Miller describes the state of the building at the time in his memoirs:

"The castle was in ruins: The battlements had collapsed, not a single room had windows, only wooden shutters. In the formal rooms, the panelled ceilings were half torn down, having been used for repairs. The foundations of the entire south eastern corner, which rested on a vertical rock face, had broken away and the rock itself underneath fallen away, so that the entire south eastern part literally hovered in the air".

In the following years urgent building work is carried out on the walls and roofs and important restoration work carried out on the interior. The silhouette of the castle undergoes one significant change. The second floor of the north-west tower dating from the late 16th century is removed and converted into a lawned terrace with battlements. The interiors are decorated by heraldic artists, typographers & painters such as Otto Hupp, Balthasar Schmitt, Franz Ruben and Rudolf von Seitz, Hanns von Gumppenberg & Franz Xaver Zettler. Rooms throughout the castle are refurnished and Karneid becomes habitable again after nearly 200 years.

=== 20th Century ===
1950

Karneid is designated an historic monument.

=== 21st Century ===
2006

The heirs of Ferdinand von Miller partially open Karneid castle to the public for the first time in its history, with the principal parts of the building unchanged since 1600. The castle remains in private ownership and can currently be viewed in April, May, June, September and October only. There are two consecutive tours every Friday at 15.00 and 16.30 with a maximum 20 persons per tour exclusively by prior arrangement with the municipality of Karneid

Kuntersweg, 2
I-39053 Kardaun
Tel: +39 0471 361300
Fax: +39 0471 361399

== The legend of the ghost riders of Karneid ==
Many years ago a dreadful plague raged in the Tyrol. From his castle high on the cliffs, the lord of Karneid surveyed the devastation in the valleys below. Fearing for the safety of his wife, his children and his followers, he made a solemn vow that if God spared the castle from disease he and his followers would perform a pilgrimage to the church of Maria Weissenstein to give thanks to the Virgin Mary.

In the weeks that followed the plague gradually retreated and all those residing in Karneid escaped unharmed. There was much celebration and the pilgrimage was soon forgotten as people returned gratefully to their everyday routines.

But the terror of the Black Death soon returned to the valley and this time struck the castle, carrying off its inhabitants one by one. The knight's entire clan, his wife and his children perished. He himself was the last to pass, a year to the day after he had made his vow.

Every year on the night of the anniversary of their Lord's death, when the grapes have ripened on the vines in the valley, the cursed inhabitants of Karneid rise from their graves to fulfill their promise and perform their pilgrimage to Weissenstein. Many a pious pilgrim seeking shelter late at night has seen the Knight and his family dressed in black, slowly riding their skeletal horses up the mountain, doomed to fulfill their vow for all eternity.

== Extract from John L. Stoddard's Lectures, Supplementary Volume III: South Tyrōl, Around Lake Garda, The Dolomites (1903) ==
"A remarkable gateway to the Dolomites is the majestic gorge, directly opposite Botzen, known as the Eggen Thal. This suffers nothing by comparism with the other portals. Indeed, to its extraordinary vestibule may be awarded the primacy of the picturesque. A mighty strip of porphyry, forty miles in length, thirteen in breadth and several thousand feet in height stretches along the western border of the Dolomites and its huge, purplish walls form a conspicuous feature in the landscapes near Meran and Botzen. One section of its blood-red cliffs, just east of the latter city, is perforated by a deep gash, several miles in length, from which emerges a tumultuous torrent. This gash is called the Eggen Thal. Into its sombre shadow winds a carriage road constructed at great cost and with enormous difficulty, which gradually ascends the cañon, passing beneath vast, overhanging precipices, crossing repeatedly the tortuous stream by means of massive bridges and even taking refuge within tunnels, at points where some concession to the opposition of the raging tunnels becomes essential. It is a solemn entrance, especially when one has some acquaintance with the Dolomite peaks which lie beyond, and knows what weird and awful shapes they can assume. On this account, the Eggen Thal is probably the most appropriate avenue of approach to those mysterious mountains. It is a corridor of time, that leads us from old igneous rocks, forged in the earths fiery furnace when our globe was young, to coral reefs, on which the ocean waves once broke in glittering spray, but which now sparkle in the frosty air, ten thousand feet above their early home. At times one looks up almost timidly between these jaws of ruddy porphyry toward the narrow streak of blue, so far away. It seems like a celestial river, whose noiselessness, limpidity and calm present a great contrast to the maddened stream beside us, as our deal of heaven differs from the storms and sorrows of this earthly life."

"Moreover, that nothing may be wanting to complete the romance of this gorge, there looms above it, at a dizzy height, Schloss Karneid - one of the mediæval castles which play so prominent a rôle in both the scenery and history of Tirol. All of these strongholds have their interesting records of achievement - some of them chivalrous, most of them cruel, all of them remarkable. Karneid for example, was the home of the Lichtensteins, who ranked already at the commencement of the 12th Century among the strongest of the Tirolean families. In the great struggle for supremacy that arose between Habsburg Archduke Frederick ('Friedl of the Empty Pockets') and the ambitious nobles of the Tirol, the masters of this fortress where the formers bitterest foes, and if an undertaking of unusual danger was ever demanded in that arduous strife, the Lichtensteins were always ready to attempt it. In the fact, the name 'A Lichtenstein' was synonymous with one who then sought absolute independence form the archduke's sovereignty. Accordingly, in 1409, Frederick laid siege to Karneid with a powerful army, captured it finally by storm, and dragged its owners into captivity. Nor were they set at liberty until Oswald von Wolkenstein - Minnesinger, warrior and the soul of the rebellion - secured their freedom by a heavy ransom. In 1760 Count Anton von Lichtenstein, the last of his race, died in his ancient stronghold, which then came into possession of the city of Botzen. But it was speedily sold by the municipality and is now the property of a wealthy and artistic citizen of Munich."
