= Hans Haasmann =

Dutch diver

Personal information
- Full name: Hans Leopold Haasman
- Nationality: Dutch
- Born: 6 January 1916; Jakarta, Dutch East Indies
- Died: 26 May 2008 (aged 92); Hervey Bay, Queensland, Australia

Sport
- Sport: Diving

Hans Haasmann (6 January 1916 – 26 May 2008) was a Dutch diver. He competed in the men's 3 metre springboard event at the 1936 Summer Olympics where he placed 15th overall
