= Frédéric Boeni =

Swiss diver (1913–2008)

Alfred Böni
Personal information
- Nationality: Swiss
- Born: 15 November 1913; Rheinfelden, Switzerland
- Died: 15 July 2008 (aged 94); Basel, Switzerland

Sport
- Sport: Diving

Alfred Böni (15 November 1913 – 15 July 2008) was a Swiss diver. He competed in the men's 3 metre springboard event at the 1936 Summer Olympics.
