= Rauf Abu Al-Seoud =

Egyptian diver

Personal information
- Born: April 29, 1915 Cairo, Egypt
- Died: November 19, 1982 (aged 67) Cairo, Egypt

Sport
- Sport: Diving
Medal record
Representing Egypt
Mediterranean Games
Bronze medal – third place	1951 Alexandria	10m platform

Rauf Abu Al-Seoud (29 April 1915 – 19 November 1982) was an Egyptian diver. He competed at the 1936 Summer Olympics in Berlin, where he placed 12th in 10 metre platform. He also competed at the 1948 Summer Olympics.
