= Franco Ferraris =

Italian diver (born 1919)

Personal information
- Nationality: Italian
- Born: 17 May 1919; Naples, Kingdom of Italy

Sport
- Sport: Diving

Franco Ferraris (born 17 May 1919, date of death unknown) was an Italian diver. He was born in Naples. He competed at the 1936 Summer Olympics in Berlin, where he placed 22nd in 10 metre platform. Ferraris is deceased.
