= KacL =

KacL may refer to:

- Neamine transaminase, an enzyme
- 2'-Deamino-2'-hydroxyneamine transaminase, an enzyme
