= Branko Ziherl =

Slovenian diver

Personal information
- Born: September 9, 1916; Ljubljana, Yugoslavia
- Died: August 1942 (aged 25)

Sport
- Sport: Diving

Branko Ziherl (9 September 1916 – August 1942) was a Slovenian diver. He was born in Ljubljana. He competed for Yugoslavia at the 1936 Summer Olympics in Berlin, where he placed 20th in 10 metre platform, and 10th in springboard. He was killed in action during World War II.
