= Karneid =

- Comune
- Gemeinde Karneid; Comune di Cornedo all'Isarco
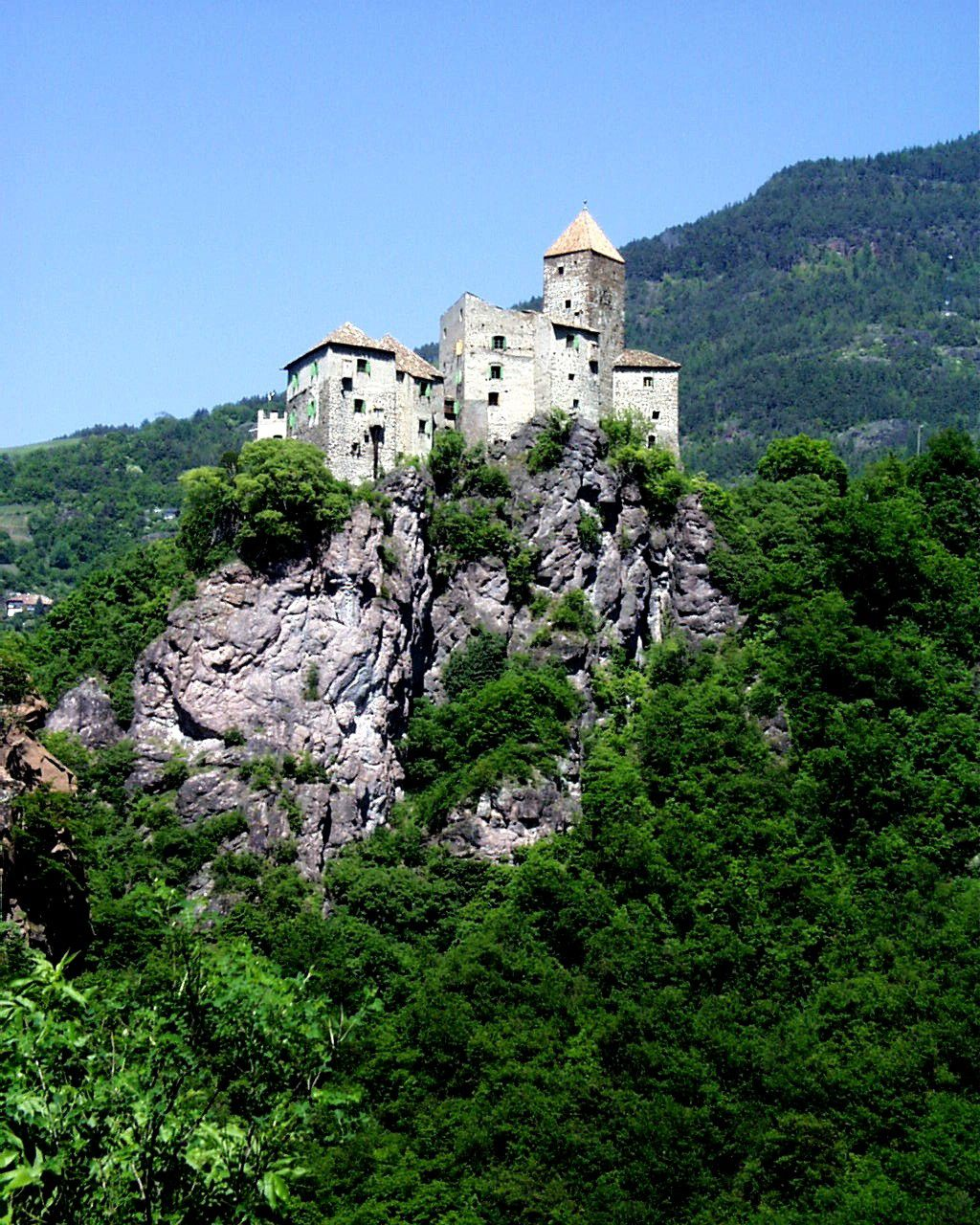
- Karneid Castle

- Coat of arms

- Location within Italy Location within Trentino-Alto Adige/Südtirol
- Coordinates: 46°29′24″N 11°24′26″E
- Country: Italy
- Region: Trentino-Alto Adige/Südtirol
- Province: South Tyrol (BZ)
- Frazioni: Blumau (Prato all'Isarco), Breien (Briè), Kardaun (Cardano), Steinegg (Collepietra), Gummer (San Valentino in Campo)

Government
  - Mayor: Albin Kofler

Area
  - Total: 40.4 km^{2} (15.6 sq mi)
- Elevation: 510 m (1,670 ft)

Population (Nov. 2010)
  - Total: 3,311
  - Density: 82.0/km^{2} (212/sq mi)
- Demonym(s): German: Karneider; Italian: di Cornedo
- Time zone: UTC+1 (CET)
  - Summer (DST): UTC+2 (CEST)
- Postal code: 39050
- Dialing code: 0471
- Website: Official website

Karneid (German: [karˈnaɪt]; Italian: Cornedo all'Isarco [korˈneːdo alliˈzarko]) is a comune (municipality) in South Tyrol in northern Italy, located about 4 kilometres (2.5 mi) east of the city of Bolzano and a village. It is also the location of Karneid castle.

== Geography ==
As of 30 November 2010, it had a population of 3,311 and an area of 40.4 square kilometres (15.6 mi^{2}).

Karneid borders the following municipalities: Bolzano, Völs am Schlern, Welschnofen, Deutschnofen, Ritten, and Tiers.

=== Frazioni ===
The municipality of Karneid (Cornedo) contains the frazioni (subdivisions, mainly villages and hamlets) Blumau (Prato all'Isarco), Breien (Briè), Kardaun (Cardano), Steinegg (Collepietra), and Gummer (San Valentino in Campo).

== History ==
=== Coat-of-arms ===
The emblem is an argent curved pile on azure. It is part of the insignia of the Counts of Liechtenstein, owners of the castle, which ruled the village from 1385 to 1595. The arms were adopted in 1968.

== Society ==
=== Linguistic distribution ===
According to the 2024 census, 87.98% of the population speak German, 11.72% Italian and 0.30% Ladin as first language.

=== Demographic evolution ===
Historical population

Year	Pop.	±%
1861	?	—
1871	?	—
1881	?	—
1901	?	—
1911	?	—

Year	Pop.	±%
1921	1,548	—
1931	2,121	+37.0%
1936	2,342	+10.4%
1951	2,323	−0.8%
1961	2,486	+7.0%

Year	Pop.	±%
1971	2,465	−0.8%
1981	2,648	+7.4%
1991	2,764	+4.4%
2001	3,113	+12.6%

Source: Data from ISTAT

== Culture ==
=== Notable people ===
- The Italian ski mountaineer Hansjörg Lunger was born in Karneid.
