= Václav Kacl =

Czech diver

Personal information
- Born: 29 July 1910

Sport
- Country: Czechoslovakia
- Sport: Diving

Václav Kacl (born 29 July 1910; date of death unknown) was a diver who competed for Czechoslovakia. He competed at the 1936 Summer Olympics in Berlin, where he placed 19th in 10 metre platform.
