= 2'-Deamino-2'-hydroxyneamine transaminase =

Class of enzymes

Identifiers
- EC no.: 2.6.1.94

Databases
- IntEnz: IntEnz view
- BRENDA: BRENDA entry
- ExPASy: NiceZyme view
- KEGG: KEGG entry
- MetaCyc: metabolic pathway
- PRIAM: profile
- PDB structures: RCSB PDB PDBe PDBsum
Search
- PMC: articles
- PubMed: articles
- NCBI: proteins

2'-Deamino-2'-hydroxyneamine transaminase (EC 2.6.1.94, kacL (gene)) is an enzyme with systematic name 2'-deamino-2'-hydroxyneamine:2-oxoglutarate aminotransferase. This enzyme catalyses the following chemical reaction

2'-deamino-2'-hydroxyneamine + 2-oxoglutarate $\rightleftharpoons$ 2'-deamino-2'-hydroxy-6'-dehydroparomamine + L-glutamate

The reaction occurs in vivo in the opposite direction.
