= Elbert Root =

American diver (1915–1983)

Personal information
- Born: July 20, 1915
- Died: July 15, 1983 (aged 67)

Sport
- Sport: Diving
Medal record
Representing United States
Olympic Games
Silver medal – second place	1936 Berlin	10 m platform

Elbert Alonzo Root (July 20, 1915 – July 15, 1983) was an American diver who competed in the 1936 Summer Olympics. In 1936 he won the silver medal in the 10 metre platform event.
