= Ferdinand von Miller =

German artisan

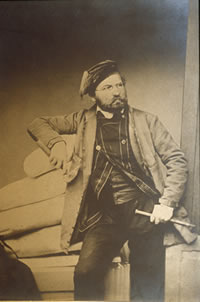
Ferdinand von Miller (the elder)

Ferdinand von Miller (18 October 1813 – 11 February 1887) was a German artisan who is noted for his furtherance of bronze founding.

== Career ==
Ferdinand von Miller was born in Fürstenfeldbruck. After a sojourn at the academy in Munich and a preliminary engagement at the royal brass foundry, Miller traveled to Paris in 1833, where he learnt from Soyer and Blus the varied technique necessary for bronze working. He also visited England and the Netherlands, and after his return to Munich worked under his teacher and uncle Stiglmayr, whom the Crown Prince Ludwig had induced to devote himself to bronze foundry work and to the establishment of the Munich foundry as a state institution. Miller soon took his uncle's place, and upon the death of the latter was appointed inspector of the workshop. He soon won for it a worldwide reputation, and for himself a fortune and position of influence.

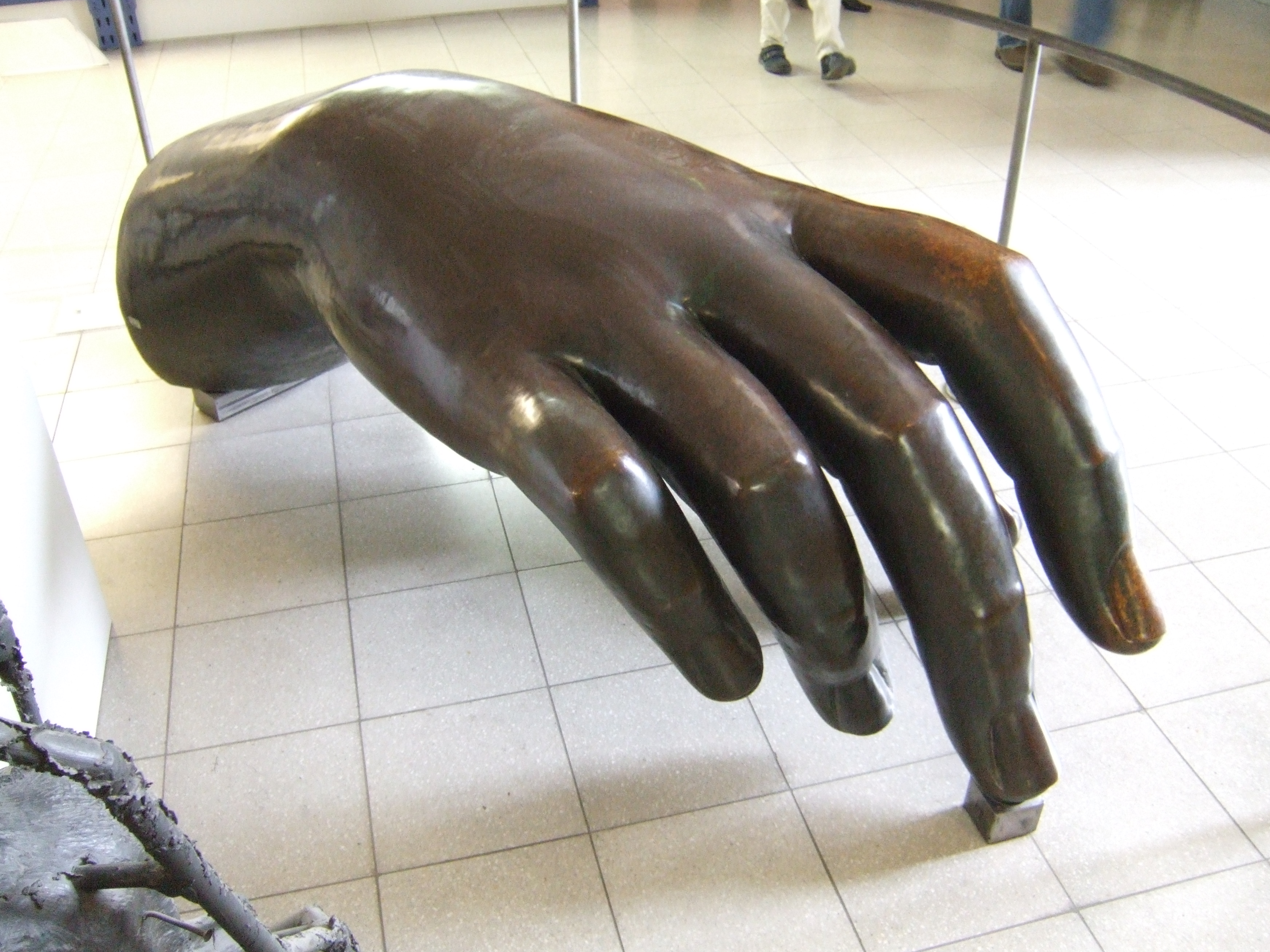
Recast of the Bavaria statue's right hand, in the Deutsches Museum

For the Bavarian hall of fame (Ruhmeshalle) in Munich Miller was commissioned with the casting of the Bavaria statue according to a design by Ludwig Michael Schwanthaler. Considered a masterpiece, the Bavaria statue (1844–1855) brought fame and fortune. Commissions came to him from far and near. He cast the statue of Herder, and the double statue of Goethe and Schiller, for Weimar, and also the figures of Duke Eberhard in Stuttgart, of Berzelius in Stockholm and two Washington monuments, by Mills in Boston and Crawford in Richmond, Virginia. He also cast the gate of the Capitol in Washington.

In 1874 Miller was elected to the directorate of the society of art industries. The Munich exhibition of art and crafts in 1876 was reportedly largely Miller's work and the first German National Arts and Crafts Exhibition. Miller sought to win over artists to a general exhibition of German art in alliance with handicrafts. Drawing rooms, cabinets, boudoirs, sitting rooms and chapels were arranged so as to form in their grouping a whole by having art and trade appliances put into the place for which they were intended. Where this was not possible, a partition or a wall would be placed with picturesque effect in some adjoining room. Miller established a center of exhibition and sale for the society, and procured himself a home especially for the social intercourse of artists and art craftsmen.

In 1840 he married Anna Pösl (1815–1890), daughter of the Chancellor of the regional government of Landshut, who bore him 14 children, including Ferdinand Freiherr von Miller, Oskar von Miller and Fritz von Miller. He died in Munich, and was buried in the Alter Südfriedhof in the same city.

== Image gallery ==
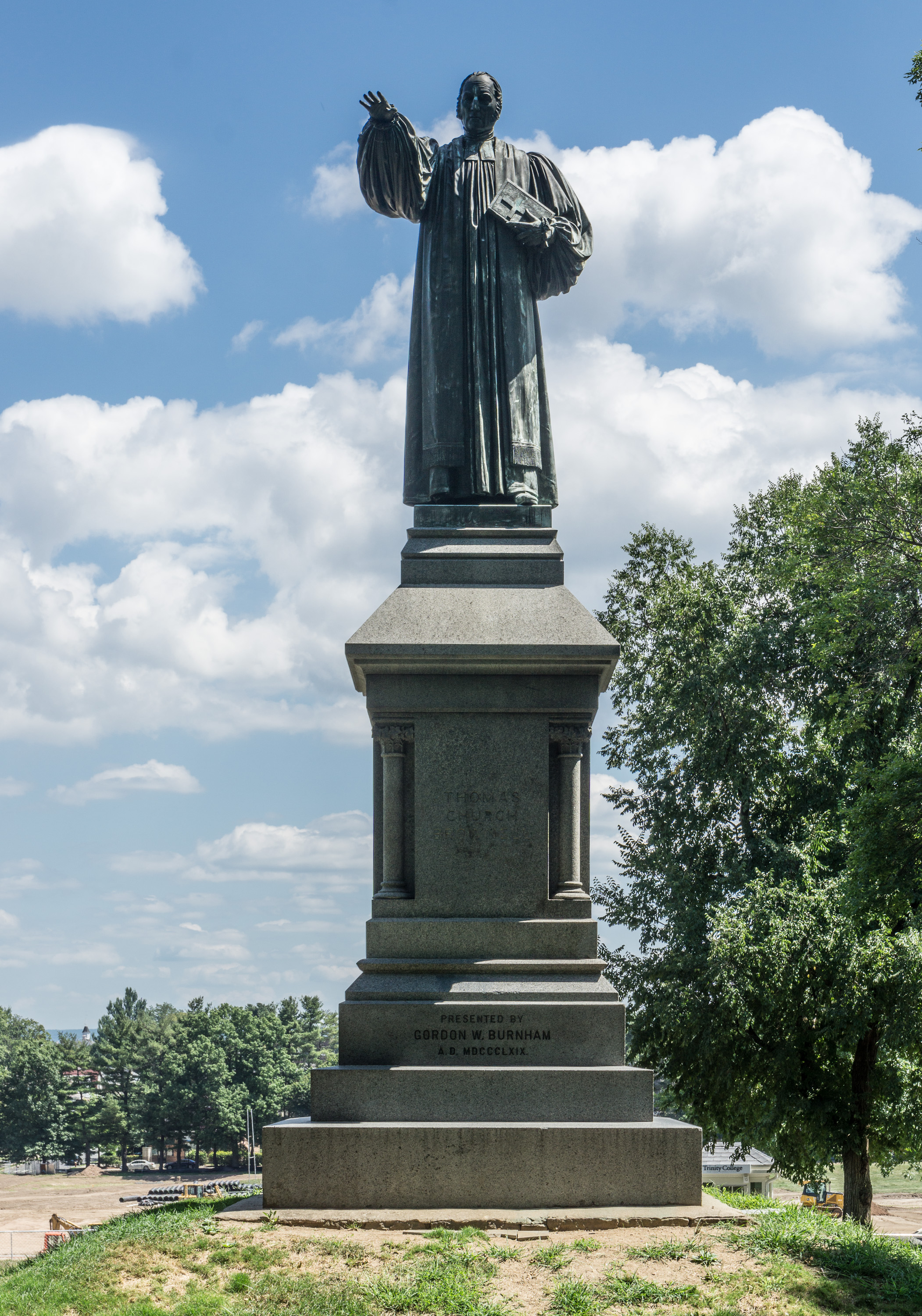
Statue of Thomas Church Brownell at Trinity College, Hartford, Connecticut

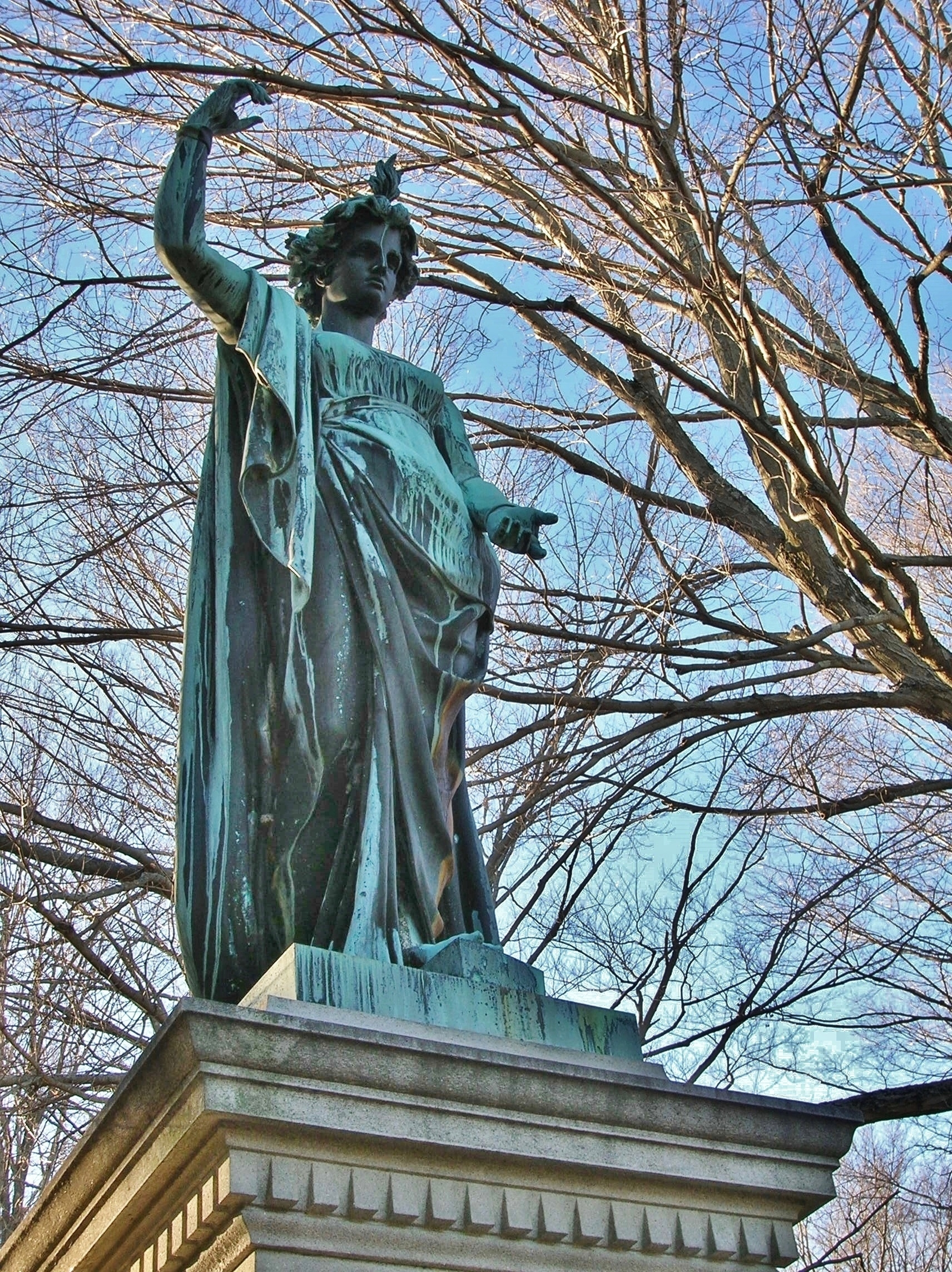
Clark Family Monument, Cedar Hill Cemetery, Hartford, CT (sculpted by Ferdinand von Miller in 1869).

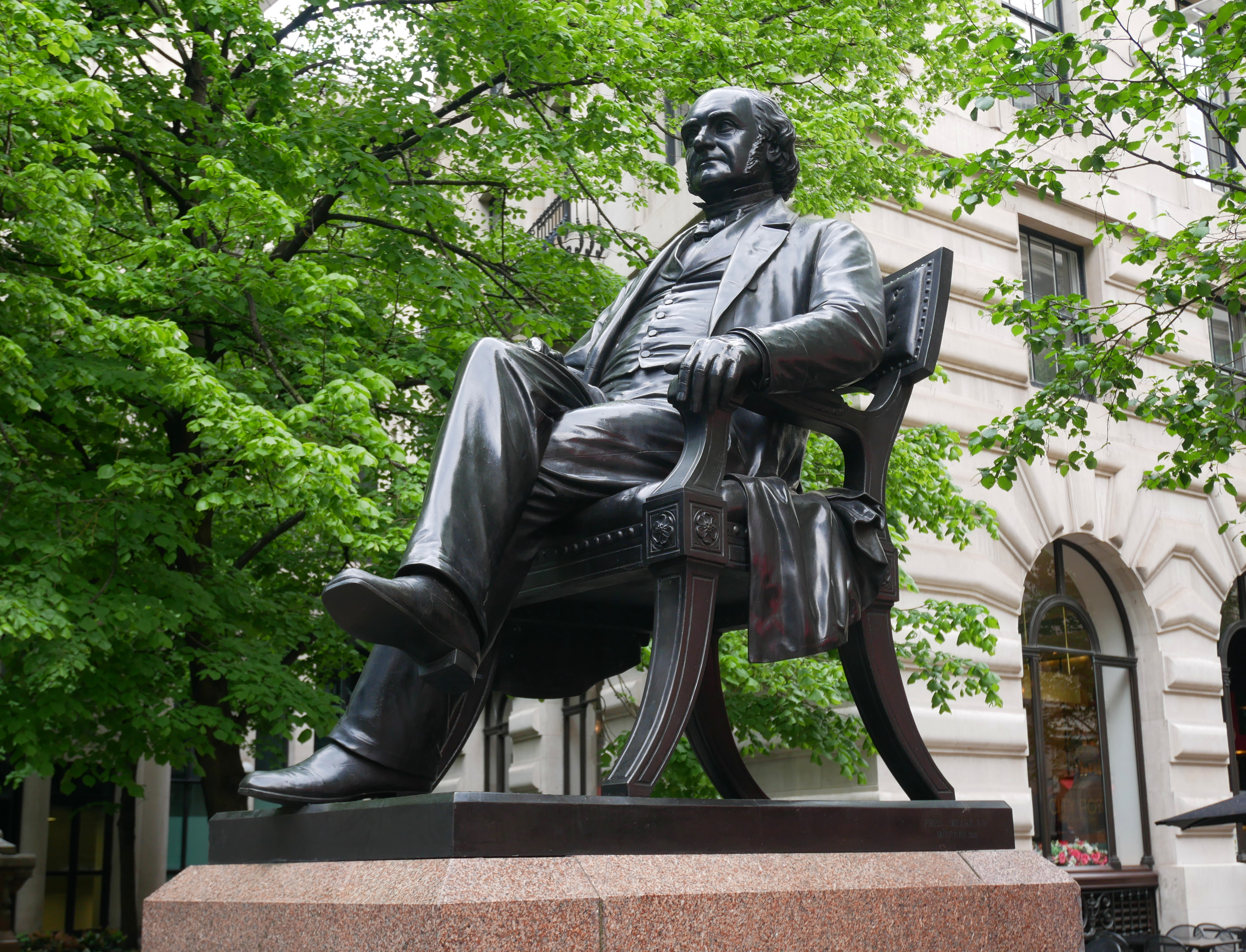
Statue of George Peabody, City of London (sculpted by William Wetmore Story in 1869)

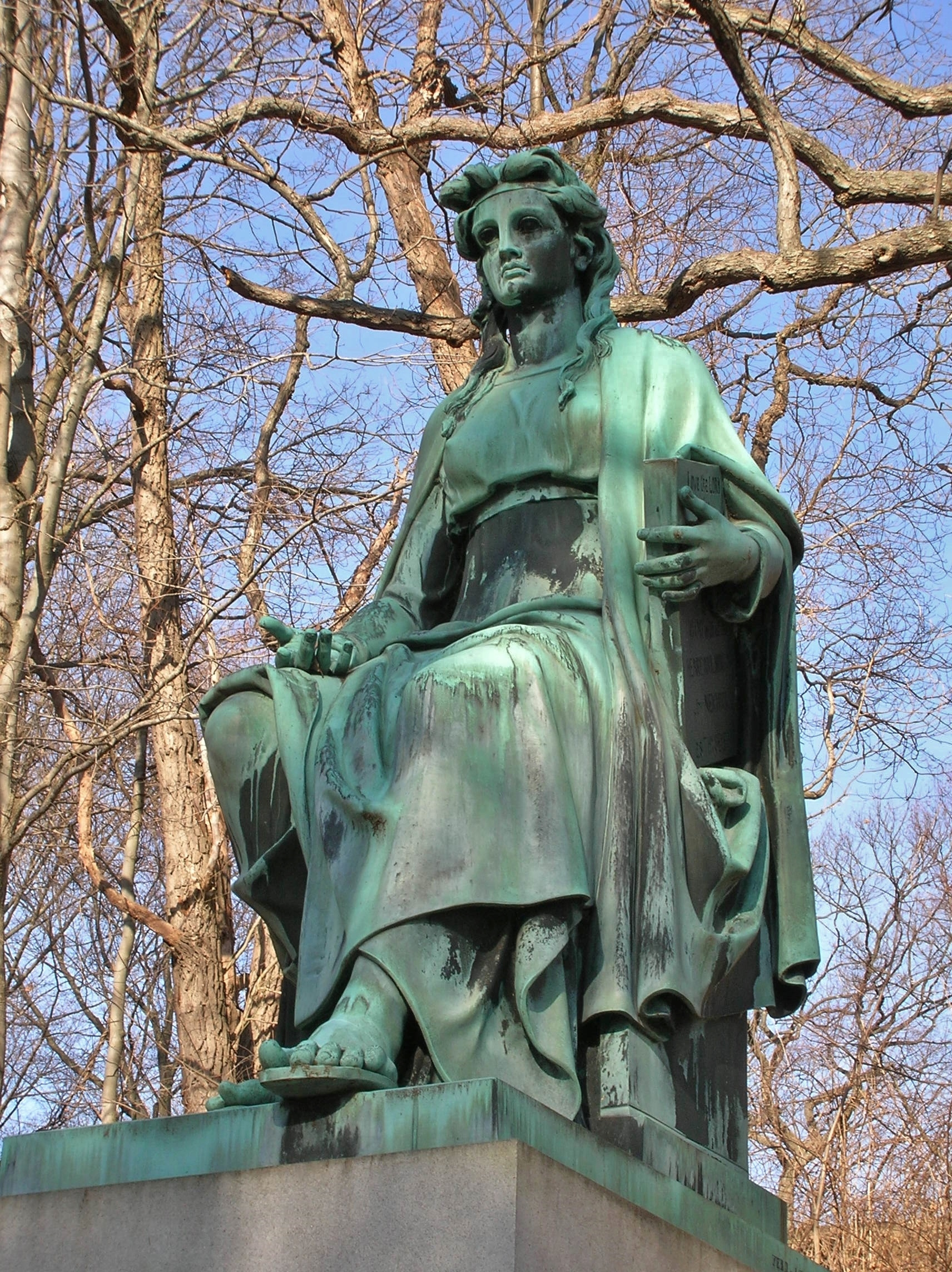
Benedict Family Monument, Riverside Cemetery, Waterbury, CT (designed by Truman H. Bartlett in 1871; sculpted by Ferdinand von Miller in 1872).

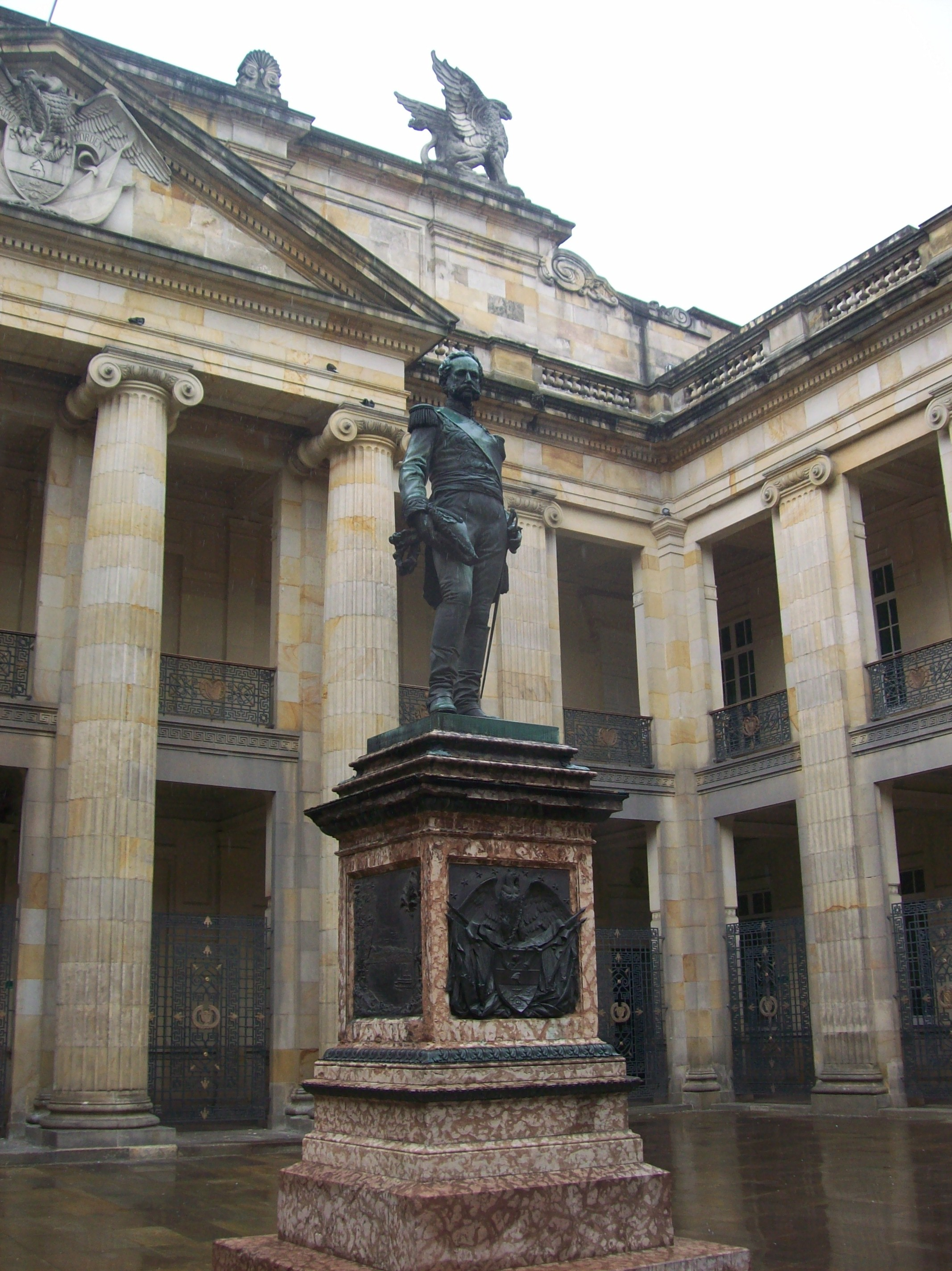
Statue of Tomás Cipriano de Mosquera at the National Capitol of Colombia, Bogotá. (Inaugurated in 1883)

== Ferdinand von Miller (the younger) and Oskar von Miller ==
Ferdinand von Miller's son Ferdinand (1842–1929) followed in his father's footsteps and is known in the United States for some of the figures on the Tyler Davidson Fountain in Cincinnati (at the unveiling on October 6, 1871, at which he was honored). He also created the statues of Shakespeare, Columbus and Alexander von Humboldt in Tower Grove Park of St. Louis and of J. Marion Sims in New York. Another son of Ferdinand von Miller was Oskar von Miller, who became an engineer and founder of the Deutsches Museum, Munich.

== Sources ==
- Hyac. Holland (1906). "Miller, Ferdinand von" . Allgemeine Deutsche Biographie (in German). Vol. 52. Leipzig: Duncker & Humblot. pp. 401–409.
- cites:
  - Friedrich Pecht, Geschichte der Münchener Kunst (Munich, 1888)
  - Vincenz Müller, Universal-Handbuch von München
