= Oskar von Miller =

German engineer

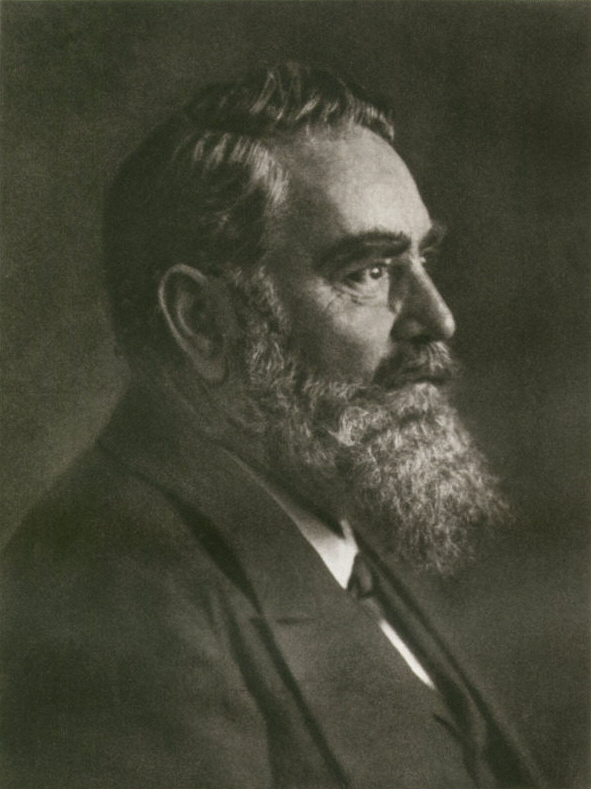
- Oskar von Miller
- Born: 12 May 1855; Munich
- Died: 9 April 1934 (aged 78); Munich, German Reich
- Known for: Deutsches Museum

Oskar Franz Xaver Miller, since 1875 von Miller (7 May 1855 – 9 April 1934), was a German engineer and founder of the Deutsches Museum, a large museum of technology and science in Munich.

== Biography ==
Born in Munich into an Upper Bavarian family from Aichach, he was the son of the first supervisor of the royal ore foundry in Munich, Ferdinand von Miller (1813–1887) and his wife Anna Pösl (1815–1890). Miller married the painter Marie Seitz in 1884, with whom he had seven children, two of whom died in infancy. His brother was the ore caster and director of the Munich Academy of Fine Arts Baron Ferdinand von Miller. With the elevation of his father Ferdinand into the Bavarian nobility on 12 October 1875 and with the inscription of the family name on the roll of the aristocracy of the Kingdom of Bavaria on 30 December 1875, Oskar was simultaneously ennobled.

Miller decided to study technology and civil engineering at the Technische Hochschule München. Soon he discovered the recently developed field of electrotechnology, and so turned to it. In 1882 he organized the first electrotechnical exhibition in Germany, after having been fascinated by the first exhibition of this kind in Paris. At this exhibition, on 16 September 1882, in partnership with Marcel Deprez, he succeeded in transmitting an electric current for the first time over a distance of approximately 60 kilometers, from Miesbach to the Glaspalast in Munich.

In 1883, along with Emil Rathenau, he was a director of the German Edison Company (later AEG). He built the first power station in Germany in 1884 in Munich.

In 1890 he founded his own engineering office, which soon became prominent in the energy industry. He took over management of the electrotechnical exhibition at Frankfurt am Main in 1891. At this exhibition Mikhail Dolivo-Dobrovolsky succeeded in transmitting 20,000 V three-phase alternating current 176 kilometers from Lauffen am Neckar to Frankfurt am Main, a technical masterpiece and significant breakthrough in the transmission of alternating current.

For several decades Miller worked on the project known as Bayernwerk, which had to use the power of Bavaria with an installed capacity of 1253 million kilowatts of the land electrics supply.

In 1903 he fulfilled his dream of founding a museum devoted to science and technology — the Deutsches Museum. Miller had recruited widespread contacts for many years for such a museum. In Prince Regent Luitpold he found a patron who assured him also of national support. Famous scientists and entrepreneurs such as Max Planck, Hugo Junkers, Wilhelm Conrad Roentgen and Emil Rathenau advised him on the structure of the departments. Nearly all the material needed for the construction of the building was donated, owing to his commitment. With Carl von Linde, he educated the first museum executive committee to the developer of the refrigeration technology and Walther von Dyck, the rector of the technical university.

In 1906 Emperor Wilhelm II laid the cornerstone of the museum complex in its current location on the museum island. Until the grand opening, which took place on von Miller's 70th birthday on 7 May 1925, smaller exhibits were set up in provisional rooms.

From 1918 to 1924 he was project manager in the building of the then-largest high pressure hydroelectric power station in the world, the Walchenseekraftwerk.

Miller died in 1934 in the Deutsches Museum as a consequence of a heart attack, a few months after the accidental death of his wife. He was interred next to the church at the Neuhausen Cemetery in Munich.

== Honours (excerpt) ==
- Member of the Upper-House (Kammer der Reichsräte) of the Bavarian Parliament
- Honorary citizen of the city of Munich
- Honorary citizen of Holzkirchen
- Honorary president of the second world conference on electrical power (Weltkraftkonferenz)
- Siemens-Ring
- Honorary member of the American Society of Mechanical Engineers, 1912.
- Wilhelm Exner Medal, inaugural awardee, 1921

Several posts which von Miller held emphasize his personality and the importance he had in electro-technology, for example:

- Chairman of the Association of German Engineers
- Member of the peace delegation of 1919 in Versailles as technical advisor
- Author of numerous books, of which those concerned with the issue of supplying electrical power to and from cities became the standard works.

The Oskar von Miller Tower is named after him.

== Notes ==
In German personal names, von is a preposition which approximately means 'of' or 'from' and usually denotes some sort of nobility. While von (always lower case) is part of the family name or territorial designation, not a first or middle name, if the noble is referred to by their last name, use Schiller, Clausewitz or Goethe, not von Schiller, etc.

== Other sources ==
- Wilhelm Füßl: Miller, Oskar von. In: Neue Deutsche Biographie (NDB). Band 17, Duncker & Humblot, Berlin 1994, ISBN 3-428-00198-2, S. 517–519
- Wilhelm Füßl: Oskar von Miller: 1855–1934. Eine Biographie, Munich: C.H.Beck, 2005, ISBN 3-406-52900-3
- Wilhelm Füßl: "Oskar von Miller." In: Katharina Weigand (Hrsg.): Große Gestalten der bayerischen Geschichte. Munich: Herbert Utz Verlag, 2011, ISBN 978-3-8316-0949-9
