= Siegfried Viebahn =

German diver

Personal information
- Born: July 29, 1911
- Died: April 23, 1996 (aged 84)

Sport
- Sport: Diving

Siegfried Viebahn (July 29, 1911 – April 23, 1996) was a German diver who competed in the 1936 Summer Olympics. In 1936 he finished seventh in the 10 metre platform event.
