= Alan Greene =

American diver (1911–2001)

Personal information
- Born: August 29, 1911
- Died: March 12, 2001 (aged 89)

Sport
- Sport: Diving
Medal record
Representing United States
Olympic Games
Bronze medal – third place	1936 Berlin	3 m springboard

Alan Greene (August 29, 1911 – March 12, 2001) was an American diver who competed in the 1936 Summer Olympics. In 1936 he won the bronze medal in the 3 meter springboard event.
