= Karl Steiner =

Austrian diver

Personal information
- Nationality: Austrian
- Born: 12 January 1906

Sport
- Sport: Diving

Karl Steiner (born 12 January 1906, date of death unknown) was an Austrian diver. He competed in the men's 3 metre springboard event at the 1936 Summer Olympics.
