= Hermann Stork =

German diver

Personal information
- Full name: Hermann Albert Stork
- Nationality: German
- Born: 30 August 1911
- Died: 12 June 1962 (aged 50)

Sport
- Sport: Diving
Medal record
Men's diving
Representing Germany
Olympic Games
Bronze medal – third place	1936 Berlin	10 m platform
European Championships
Gold medal – first place	1934 Magdeburg	10 m highboard

Hermann Stork (30 August 1911 – 12 June 1962) was a German diver who competed in the 1936 Summer Olympics. In 1936 he won the bronze medal in the 10 metre platform event.
