= St. Benno, Munich =

Coordinates: 48°09′08″N 11°33′10″E

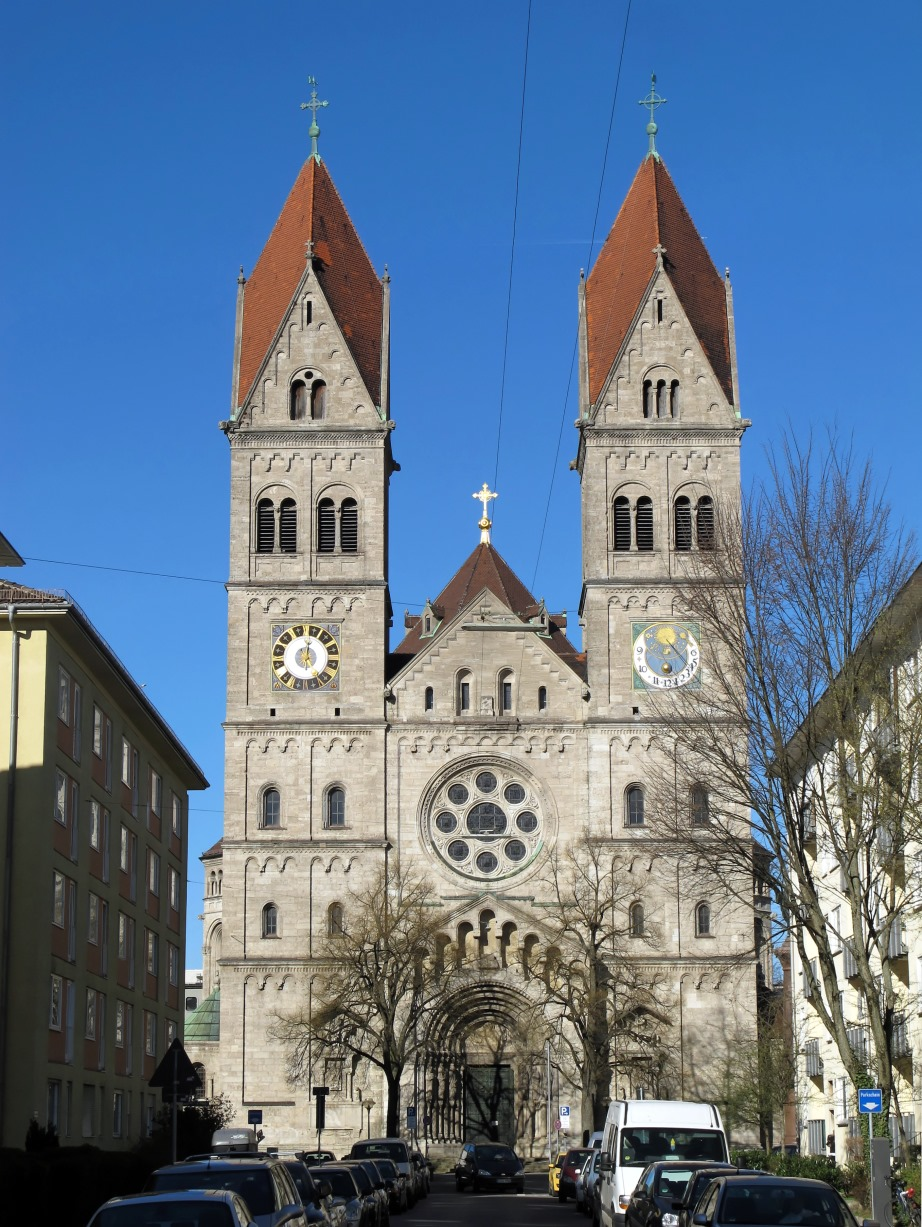
St. Benno

St. Benno is a Catholic church and parish in Maxvorstadt, part of Munich, Bavaria, Germany. It is dedicated to Benno of Meissen.

The large church with two spires was built from 1888 to 1895, designed by Leonhard Romeis in Romanesque Revival style. The church is regarded as a convincing neo-Romanesque sacred buildings of the 19th century in Munich, along with St. Anna im Lehel.
