= Deaths in February 1988 =

The following is a list of notable deaths in February 1988.

Entries for each day are listed alphabetically by surname. A typical entry lists information in the following sequence:

- Name, age, country of citizenship at birth, subsequent country of citizenship (if applicable), reason for notability, cause of death (if known), and reference.

== February 1988 ==
=== 1 ===
- N. M. Bodecker, 66, Danish-born American author and illustrator of children's books (Tales of Magic), colon cancer.
- Marcel Bozzuffi, 58, French film actor (The French Connection).
- John Grist Brainerd, 83, American electrical engineer (ENIAC).
- Gerald Butler, 80, English writer of crime and thriller novels (Kiss the Blood Off My Hands; There Is a Death, Elizabeth).
- Ted Hill, 72, Australian barrister, lawyer and communist activist, chairman of the Communist Party of Australia.
- Thomas Francis Johnson, 78, American politician, member of U.S. House of Representatives (1959-1963), car crash.
- Ion Lungu, 66, Romanian footballer.
- Heather O'Rourke, 12, American child actress (Poltergeist), congenital stenosis of intestine.
- Red Phillips, 79, American MLB player (Detroit Tigers).
- Stephen Taylor, 77, British physician and politician, member of the House of Lords.
- Eddie Townsend, 73, American professional boxing trainer, cancer.
- Marisa Vernati, 67, Italian actress.

=== 2 ===
- Frederick Blaney, 69, Irish cricketer.
- Richard Chase, 83, American folklorist.
- Caroline Chew, 86, American dancer.
- Solomon Cutner, 85, British pianist.
- Quamrul Hassan, 66, Bengali artist, heart attack.
- Thomas Lamb, 91, American industrial designer, pneumonia.
- Percy Lawrie, 85, English cricketer.
- Rossana Martini, 62, Italian actress and model.
- Carlos Monges, 61, Mexican Olympic sprinter (1948).
- Normie Smith, 79, Canadian NHL ice hockey player (Detroit Red Wings, Montreal Maroons).
- G. Mennen Williams, 76, American politician, Governor of Michigan, ambassador to the Philippines, stroke.

=== 3 ===
- Ronald Bladen, 69, Canadian-American painter and sculptor, cancer.
- Sam D'Allesandro, 31, American writer and poet, AIDS.
- Robert Duncan, 69, American poet, heart attack.
- Radamés Gnattali, 82, Brazilian composer and conductor.
- Werner Kissling, 92, German-born Scottish ethnographer and photographer.
- René Massigli, 99, French diplomat, ambassador to the U.K. and Turkey.
- Kenneth Lee Porter, 91, American WWI flying ace.
- Jocko Thompson, 71, American Major League baseball player (Philadelphia Phillies).
- Dymock Watson, 84, British Royal Navy officer, Commander-in-Chief, South Atlantic.
- Lewis Wolberg, 82, American psychoanalyst (hypnoanalysis), heart attack.
- Sewall Wright, 98, American geneticist, fall.

=== 4 ===
- Clyde Coombs, 75, American psychologist (Coombs' method).
- Frank Giacoia, 63, American comics artist (Captain America, The Amazing Spider-Man).
- Dhamma Jagoda, 47, Sri Lankan theatre and television play director and actor.
- Franz Mandl, 71, Austrian Olympic footballer (1936).
- Bill Narduzzi, 51, American football player and coach, Hodgkin's disease.
- Krzysztof Sitkowski, 52, Polish Olympic basketball player (1960, 1964).
- Jonas Turkow, 89, Polish-Israeli actor, director and writer.

=== 5 ===
- Ove Arup, 92, English engineer, design engineer for Sydney Opera House.
- Dorothy Lewis Bernstein, 73, American mathematician, president of the Mathematics Association of America.
- Inger Carlsen, 69, Dutch Olympic swimmer (1936).
- Bennie Dobbins, 55, American stuntman and actor (Planes, Trains and Automobiles; Ferris Bueller's Day Off), heart attack.
- Clement Hurd, 80, American illustrator of children's books (Goodnight Moon, The Runaway Bunny), Alzheimer's disease.
- Emeric Pressburger, 85, Hungarian-born British film director and producer (49th Parallel), pneumonia.

=== 6 ===
- Gary Berland, 37, American professional poker player, blood disorder.
- Richard Bock, 61, American jazz record producer.
- Marghanita Laski, 72, English journalist and novelist, lung disease.
- Nick Pietrosante, 50, American NFL footballer (Detroit Lions), prostate cancer.
- Barclay Plager, 46, Canadian ice hockey player (St. Louis Blues), brain cancer.
- Carmen Polo, 87, Spanish wife of Francisco Franco, bronchial pneumonia.
- Zvonimir Rogoz, 100. Croatian actor.

=== 7 ===
- Upendranath Barman, 88, Indian politician, member of Lok Sabha.
- Lin Carter, 57, American science fiction and fantasy author (Ballantine Adult Fantasy series), cancer.
- Aldo Federici, 67, Italian Olympic ice hockey player (1948, 1956).
- Martine Géliot, 39, French classical harpist.
- Ray Martin, 69, Austrian-born British orchestra leader, cancer.
- Ririd Myddelton, 85, English High Sheriff of Denbighshire, Equerry to The Queen.
- Dermot O'Brien, 81, Australian rules footballer.
- Tony Santos Sr., 67, Filipino actor and director (Badjao: The Sea Gypsies).

=== 8 ===
- Pietro Arcari, 78, Italian footballer (AC Milan, Genoa).
- Dolores Camarillo, 77, Mexican actress (Ahí está el detalle).
- Allan Cuthbertson, 67, Australian-British actor (Fawlty Towers – Gourmet Night, Edge of Darkness).
- Santosh Dutta, 62, Bengali actor (Sonar Kella, Joi Baba Felunath).
- Ralph Flanagan, 69, American swimmer and Olympic medalist (1932, 1936).
- Hans Krueger, 78, Nazi German Gestapo captain in occupied Poland, responsible for massacres against Poles and Jews.
- Swayne Latham, 90, American college football player (Vanderbilt Commodores).
- Daisy Turner, 104, American storyteller and poet.
- Frank Varey, 79, English speedway rider.
- Alfréd Wetzler, 69, Slovak writer (Vrba–Wetzler report).
- Helen Wood, 70, American film and radio actress.

=== 9 ===
- Kurt Herbert Adler, 69, Austrian-American conductor, heart attack.
- Ermal Allen, 69, American professional footballer (Cleveland Browns) and coach (Dallas Cowboys), cancer.
- Marjorie May Bacon, 86, British printmaker and painter.
- Henry Burrell, 83, Australian navy commander, vice admiral of the Royal Australian Navy.
- Israel Nathan Herstein, 64, Polish-born American mathematician (ring theory), cancer.
- Phillip Hutchinson, 24, American bank robber, murderer and escaped convict, shot by police.
- Charles Moses, 88, British-born Australian administrator, general manager of Australian Broadcasting Commission.
- Fritz Redl, 85, Austrian-American child psychoanalyst.
- William Sackville, 66, British peer, suicide.

=== 10 ===
- Jim Bailey, 79, English cricketer.
- Nat Cohen, 82, British film producer (The Sleeping Tiger, The Tommy Steele Story, Carry On ...), heart attack.
- Alfred Eichner, 50, American economist.
- Cynthia Gooding, 63, American folk singer, cancer.
- Wolfgang Lange, 89, Nazi German army general, Knight's Cross of the Iron Cross recipient.
- Lothar Malskat, 74, German painter and art restorer.
- Don Patterson, 51, American jazz organist.
- Chaya Mushka Schneerson, 86, Russian-American wife of Menachem Mendel Schneerson, Jewish spiritual leader.

=== 11 ===
- Mary E. Black, 92, American waver and weaving instructor.
- Marion Crawford, 78, Scottish governess to Princesses Margaret and Elizabeth, cancer.
- René Hall, 75, American guitarist, heart disease.
- Virgil D. Hawkins, 81, American attorney, kidney failure.
- Gail L. Ireland, 92, American politician, Attorney General of Colorado.
- Amirteymour Kalali, 93, Iranian politician, member of the Parliament of Iran.
- Neville Mckoy, 41, Jamaican cricketer.

=== 12 ===
- Reino Aarnio, 75, Finnish-born American architect.
- Robert Coin, 86, French sculptor and engraver.
- Briggs Gordon, 38, American television host.
- Max Heine, 76–77, German-born American value investor and fund manager, traffic accident.
- Gustav Koranteng-Addow, 69, Ghanaian Attorney General and Commissioner for Justice.
- Bernard Lippmann, 73, American theoretical physicist (Lippmann–Schwinger equation in scattering theory).

=== 13 ===
- John Curulewski, 37, American musician, original member of Styx, brain aneurysm.
- Ron Embleton, 57, British illustrator and comics artist (Mickey Mouse Weekly, Penthouse), heart attack.
- José Carlos Godoy, 76, Peruvian Olympic basketball player (1936).
- Dorothy Kurgans Goldberg, 79, American artist and writer, Supreme Court justice, lung cancer.
- Léon Goossens, 90, English oboist.
- Cecil L. Hartman, 87, American college football player and coach.
- Noel Horsfield, 74, South African Olympic sailor (1952, 1956).
- Sidney Martin, 79, South African cricketer.
- Ivan Peries, 66, Sri Lankan Artist.
- Ashley Winlaw, 74, English cricketer.

=== 14 ===
- Nora Astorga, 39, Nicaraguan guerrilla fighter and politician, ambassador to the United Nations, cervical cancer.
- Ambrogio Beretta, 82, Italian Olympic cyclist (1928).
- Frederick Loewe, 86, German-born American composer (My Fair Lady), cardiac arrest.
- Jan de Kreek, 84, Dutch footballer.
- Cal Niday, 73, American racecar driver, heart attack.
- Mark Serrurier, 83, American president of Moviola, Alzheimer's disease.
- Alfonso Valdés Cobián, 97, Puerto Rican industrialist and politician, cofounder of Cervecería India, heart attack.
- Auguste Verdyck, 86, Belgian road bicycle racer.
- Lynette White, 20, Welsh murder victim.
- Joseph Wresinski, 71, French priest.
- Slavko Zagorac, 78, Bosnian football player and manager.

=== 15 ===
- Joseph O. Butcher, 75, American general in the U.S. Marine Corps.
- Pat Close, 39, American child actor (Imitation of Christ, Sunrise at Campobello), liver disease.
- Al Cohn, 62, American jazz saxophonist, arranger and composer, liver cancer.
- Richard Feynman, 69, American theoretical physicist, Nobel laureate in Physics, kidney failure.
- Neil R. Jones, 78, American science fiction writer.
- Arthur Judd, 84, English cricketer.
- Jay Leyda, 78, American filmmaker and film historian, heart failure.
- Francisco Manrique, 69, Argentinian naval officer and presidential candidate, lymphoma.
- Gardiner Means, 91, American economist (The Modern Corporation and Private Property), stroke.
- Arthur Mizener, 80, American professor of English and literary critic (The Far Side of Paradise), heart failure.

=== 16 ===
- Dragan Boltar, 74, Croatian architect.
- Jean Carignan, 71, Canadian fiddler.
- Bill Cox, 74, American politician and MLB player (St. Louis Cardinals, Chicago White Sox, St. Louis Browns).
- Charles Delaunay, 77, French author and jazz expert, co-founder of Hot Club de France, Parkinson's disease.
- Hélène Gordon-Lazareff, 78, Russian-born French journalist.
- Vijaya Kumaratunga, 42, Sri Lankan actor, singer and politician, assassinated.
- Oskar Skogly, 80, Norwegian trade unionist and politician.
- Fredrick Monroe Taylor, 86, American district judge (United States District Court for the District of Idaho).
- Ye Shengtao, 93, Chinese writer, journalist and politician, Chinese Vice-Minister of Culture.

=== 17 ===
- John M. Allegro, 65, English archaeologist and Dead Sea Scrolls scholar, heart attack.
- Alexander Bashlachev, 27, Soviet poet, singer-songwriter and guitarist, probable suicide.
- Yuri Ovchinnikov, 53, Soviet bio-organic chemist, contributed to Soviet biological weapons program.
- Veijo Pasanen, 57, Finnish actor (Pikku Kakkonen).
- Alain Savary, 69, French politician, Minister of National Education.
- Karpoori Thakur, 64, Indian politician, Chief Minister of Bihar, cardiac arrest.
- Reginald Uren, 81, New Zealand architect.

=== 18 ===
- Luciano Gariboldi, 60, Italian footballer.
- Mahmood-ul Hassan, 63, Pakistani Olympic field hockey player (1948, 1952).
- Michael Howard, 71, British actor and comedian.
- Abderrahman Ibrir, 68, Algerian-born French footballer.
- Walter Ohmsen, 76, Nazi German officer in the Kriegsmarine, first German to sight the D-Day naval force.
- Giovanni Savonuzzi, 77, Italian automobile designer (Cisitalia, Carrozzeria Ghia, Chrysler).

=== 19 ===
- Isabel Bishop, 85, American painter and graphic artist (Tidying Up), Parkinson's disease.
- René Char, 80, French poet, member of the French resistance, heart attack.
- André Cournand, 92, French-born American physician (cardiac catheterization), Nobel laureate in Medicine, pneumonia.
- William W. Eagles, 93, American general in the U.S. Army.
- Gloria Hollister, 87, American explorer and scientist (New York Zoological Society), cardiac arrest.
- Walerian Kisieliński, 80, Polish Olympic footballer (1936).
- S. V. Sahasranamam, 74, Indian actor and director, heart attack.
- Frank Strafaci, 71, American amateur golfer.
- Eric Stryker, 33, American gay pornographic performer and model, AIDS.

=== 20 ===
- José de Almeida, 83, Brazilian Olympic sprinter (1932, 1936).
- MaKee K. Blaisdell, 56, American actor (Hawaiian Eye), heart failure.
- Matt Fox, 81, American illustrator and comic book artist.
- Bob Kirkpatrick, 72, Canadian NHL player (New York Rangers).
- Ahmet Tuna Kozan, 44-45, Turkish Olympic footballer (1960).
- Bob O'Farrell, 91, American Major League baseball player (Chicago Cubs, New York Giants, St. Louis Cardinals).
- Mildred Seydell, 98, American journalist.
- Roger J. Williams, 94, Indian-born American biochemist (nutrition), pneumonia.
- Jim Woods, 71, American Major League baseball sportscaster, cancer.

=== 21 ===
- Angie Debo, 98, American historian who focused on Native American and Oklahoma history.
- Cornelis van Eesteren, 90, Dutch architect and urban planner (Lelystad).
- David Otis Fuller, 84, American Baptist pastor.
- Aidan McAnespie, 23, Irish murder victim, killed by British soldier.
- Gustaf Nyblæus, 80, Swedish army officer and Olympic equestrian (1936).
- Francisco Prío, 86, Cuban Senator.
- Aleksandar Tomašević, 79, Serbian international footballer and manager (BASK, Yugoslavia).
- Leonard Treganowan, 56, Australian Olympic weightlifter (1956).
- Martin Winter, 32, German Olympic rower (1980).
- Heydar Yaghma, 64, Iranian poet.

=== 22 ===
- Charles L. Banks, 73, American general in the U.S. Marine Corps (Battle of Chosin Reservoir).
- Albert Collier, 78, Australian rules footballer (Collingwood).
- Victor Erroelen, 71, Belgian footballer.
- Barrie Heath, 71, British Royal Air Force pilot in the Battle of Britain.
- Eugen Iordache, 65, Romanian Olympic footballer (1952).
- Afro Poli, 85, Italian operatic baritone.
- Pao Ming Pu, 77, Chinese mathematician (systolic geometry).
- Cecil Ramage, 93, Scottish barrister, actor and politician, Member of Parliament.
- Larry Shay, 90, American songwriter ("When You're Smiling"), lung cancer and emphysema.

=== 23 ===
- Edward Vaughan Bevan, 80, British rower and Olympic gold medalist (1928).
- Maurice Boisvert, 91, Canadian politician and lawyer, member of the House of Commons of Canada (1949-1957).
- Henri Collard, 76, Belgian Olympic cyclist (1936).
- Pete Donohue, 87, American Major League baseball player (Cincinnati Reds).
- Jack Dugger, 65, American NFL and basketball player (Detroit Lions, Chicago Bears, Syracuse Nationals).
- Charlie Jackman, 82, New Zealand cricketer.
- Joseph Karakis, 85, Ukrainian architect (National Museum of the History of Ukraine).
- Leroy Leblanc, 73, American swing musician.

=== 24 ===
- Irwin Chanin, 96, American architect and real estate developer (Richard Rodgers Theatre, The Century).
- Rose Coyle, 73, Miss America 1936.
- James H. Douglas Jr., 88, American lawyer, senior official in U.S. Government, Secretary of the Air Force, cancer.
- Loretta McNeil, 81, American Olympic sprinter (1928).
- Memphis Slim, 72, American blues pianist, singer and composer ("Every Day I Have the Blues"), renal failure.
- Stanisław Pastecki, 80, Polish Olympic ice hockey player (1928).
- Mamdouh Salem, 69, Prime Minister of Egypt.
- Timothy Scott, 32, American Broadway actor and dancer, AIDS.
- Seymour Siegel, 60, American rabbi, professor of Ethics and Theology.
- Harry Yven, 75, Norwegian footballer.
- Bluma Zeigarnik, 87, Soviet psychologist.

=== 25 ===
- Bernard Ashmole, 93, British archaeologist and art historian.
- William Harold Cox, 86, American judge of the United States District Court for the Southern District of Mississippi.
- Kurt Mahler, 84, German-born British-Australian mathematician (Mahler's inequality, Mahler's compactness theorem).
- Peck Morrison, 68, American jazz bassist.
- Dori Seda, 37, American comic artist, influenza.
- H. E. Todd, 80, English writer of children's fiction (Bobby Brewster).

=== 26 ===
- Edward Byrne, 22, American police officer, murdered in the line of duty.
- Ze'ev Herring, 77-78, Israeli politician, member of the Knesset (1969-1974).
- Kang Mun-bong, 64, South Korean military officer.
- Joseph Kiselewski, 87, American sculptor.
- Emmet McLoughlin, 65, Irish Olympic footballer (1948).
- Frane Milčinski, 73, Slovenian poet and writer (Twinkle Sleepyhead).
- Tom Oliver, 85, American MLB player (Boston Red Sox).

=== 27 ===
- Basil Boothroyd, 77, English humorous writer (Punch).
- George Clutesi, 83, Canadian artist, actor and writer (Dreamspeaker).
- Cecil Coleman, 63, American football player, coach, and college athletics administrator.
- Michel-Louis Guérard des Lauriers, 89, French excommunicated Catholic bishop.
- Doug Holmquist, 46, American Minor League baseball player, MLB coach (New York Yankees).
- Franck Lavaud, 85, Haitian general and politician, president of Haiti.
- Gene de Paul, 68, American pianist, composer and songwriter ("Teach Me Tonight"), brain tumour.
- Kenneth Peach, 84, American cinematographer.
- Ramiro Prialé, 84, Peruvian politician.
- Jack Roberts, 78, American judge.

=== 28 ===
- Beatrice Burns, 82, American First Lady of Hawaii, wife of John A. Burns.
- Irja Hagfors, 82, Finnish dance artist and choreographer.
- Edith North Johnson, 85, American blues singer, pianist and songwriter.
- Alfred Frøkjær Jørgensen, 89, Danish Olympic gymnast (1920).
- Harvey Kuenn, 57, American Major League baseball player (Detroit Tigers, San Francisco Giants), heart disease and diabetes.
- Mikhail Naimy, 98, Lebanese poet, novelist and philosopher, pneumonia.
- Asakazu Nakai, 86, Japanese cinematographer (Stray Dog, Ran).
- Jørgen Fryd Petersen, 62, Danish Olympic weightlifter (1948).
- Kylie Tennant, 75, Australian novelist, playwright and historian (Ride on Stranger).

=== 29 ===
- Bennie Charleston, 80, American Negro Leagues baseball player.
- John Henry Guinness, 52, British chairman of Guinness Mahon, complications from a fall.
- Sidney Harmon, 80, American movie producer and screenwriter (The Talk of the Town).
- Frank Kerr Hays, 91, American WWI flying ace.
- Paul Ramsey, 74, American Methodist ethicist, heart attack.
- Kaare Walberg, 75, Norwegian Olympic ski jumper (1932, 1936).
- Karl Zimmer, 76, German nuclear chemist, heart attack.

=== Unknown date ===
- John Smith, 49, English footballer (West Ham United).
- Dick Walker, 74, English footballer (West Ham United).
