= Irma Schoennauer Cole =

American swimmer

Irma (Schoennauer) Cole
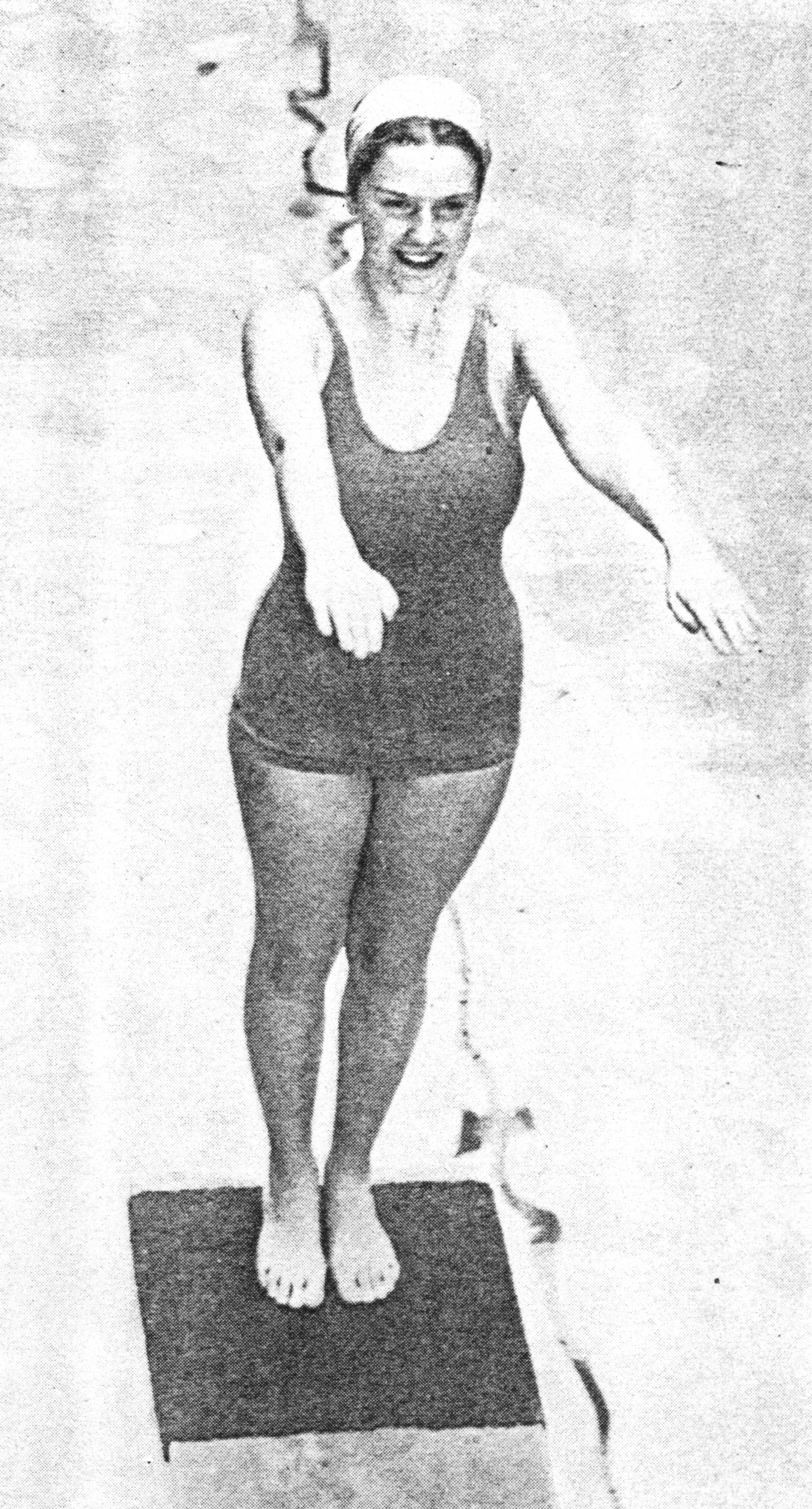
- Born: January 15, 1920; Seattle, Washington, U.S.
- Died: November 6, 2003 (aged 83); Tacoma, Washington, U.S.
- Other names: Irmgard Ida Ottilie Schoennauer
- Occupation: Civil Servant
- Known for: Swimming
- Spouse: Melvin Leroy Cole

Irma (Schoennauer) Cole (born as Irmgard Ida Ottilie Schoennauer; January 15, 1920 – November 6, 2003) was one of the United States’s premier swimmers in the late 1930s and early 1940s. Born in Seattle, Washington, she was the daughter and eldest child of Chicago native, Arthur Charles John Schoennauer, and Prussian immigrant, Ida Amalia Ottilie Welk. Irma’s father was a career typesetter employed by the Seattle Post-Intelligencer for most of his life; her mother was a seamstress and clothing designer. As a teen, Irmgard attended Lincoln High School in Seattle, and graduated from the University of Washington in 1942 with a BA degree in Communications. As a freshman, she was a member of "Chi of Phrateres," a philanthropic-social organization for female college students at the university.

Born the year female swimmers became the first American women to achieve full Olympic status, Irma began her competitive swimming career as a child at Green Lake in Seattle, having local swimming champion Helene Madison as her older role model. Quickly recognized for her natural swimming ability and competitive spirit, Imgard was invited to join the swimming team of the Washington Athletic Club in 1935, soon winning numerous local, regional, statewide, and multi-state telegraph races, and was a member of the 400-yard relay team that won the National Championship in 1938. Groomed to compete in 1940 Summer Olympics, she continued competitive swimming after the outbreak of World War II, even though the Olympic Games were suspended by the IOC. It is very likely, had it not been for the war, she would have competed on the United States Olympic swim team, possibly alongside peer, Esther Williams of California.

She made a career as a civil servant for the Federal Government for over 40 years; starting with the Department of the Interior at Mount Rainier National Park in Washington state after graduating from college, the Department of the War (Army & Air Force) in California during the latter part of World War II, and the Social Security Administration from about 1953 in various states, including California, Kansas, Maryland and finally Washington, where she retired about 1982.

Irma married Melvin Leroy Cole of Arkansas in 1955 in Ellensburg, Washington. Because they both worked for the same government agency, after married they rarely resided in the same city. Although two children were born of this union, partly as a result of this forced separation, they divorced in 1963. Besides her lifelong interest in swimming, she enjoyed travelling by train (she never got a driver's license, owned a car, or flew in a plane), investing in real estate, and researching her family history. Irma died in Tacoma, Washington at the age of 83. Her remains were buried at Lake View Cemetery in Seattle.
