= List of Phrateres chapters =

Phrateres is a North American women's social and philanthropic society that was similar to a sorority. It was established at the University of California, Los Angeles in 1924. In 2001, the national organization ceased operations and turned over its assets to the Theta chapter. In the following list, active chapters are indicated in bold and inactive chapters are in italics.

Chapter	Charter date and range	Institution	Location	Status	Ref.
Alpha	December 10, 1924 – after 1974	University of California, Los Angeles	Los Angeles, California	Inactive	
Beta	February 18, 1929 – 197x ?	University of Washington	Seattle, Washington	Inactive	(Note: Chapter formed from Kla-How-Yah, established in 1913.)
Gamma	June 23, 1930 – 1968	Oregon State University	Corvallis, Oregon	Inactive	
Delta	1929–194x ?	Whitman College	Walla Walla, Washington	Inactive	
Epsilon	March 23, 1931 – 1951	University of New Mexico	Albuquerque, New Mexico	Inactive	
Zeta	1932–1940	Carroll College	Waukesha, Wisconsin	Inactive	(Note: The chapter's alumni chapter remained active, creating and awarding the Lura Heeter Scholarship Award to descendants of Phrateres members.)
Eta	1933–195x ?	Colorado Agricultural and Mechanical College (now Colorado State University)	Fort Collins, Colorado	Inactive	
**Theta**	February 1, 1935	University of British Columbia	Vancouver, British Columbia, Canada	Active	
Iota	1935–195x ?	University of California, Berkeley	Berkeley, California	Inactive	
Kappa	May 10, 1936 – 197x ?	California State University, Fresno	Fresno, California	Inactive	(Note: Chapter formed at Fresno State Normal School, now called California State University, Fresno.)
Lambda	December 15, 1937 – 2000	University of Arizona	Tucson, Arizona	Inactive	(Note: Chapter also called itself Phi Lambda Phratere.)
Mu	1939–19xx ?	Utah State Agricultural College	Logan, Utah	Inactive	
Nu	January 18, 1939 – 197x ?	University of California, Santa Barbara	Santa Barbara, California	Inactive	
Xi	1941–after 1945	Illinois Wesleyan University	Bloomington, Illinois	Inactive	(Note: Chapter formed from Rho Phi Sigma sorority.)
Omicron	January 30, 1941 – February 27, 1945	Augustana College	Rock Island, Illinois	Inactive	
Rho	April 7, 1942 – after 1985	University of Southern California	Los Angeles, California	Inactive	
Sigma	February 1, 1945 – after 1974	University of Texas at El Paso	El Paso, Texas	Inactive	
Pi	1942–19xx ?	Kent State University	Kent, Ohio	Inactive	
Delta 2	March 1950–197x ?	California State University, Los Angeles	Los Angeles, California	Inactive	(Note: Chapter started at the Los Angeles State College, now called California State University, Los Angeles.)
Eta 2	March 9, 1958 – 199x ?	Arizona State University	Phoenix, Arizona	Inactive	
Omega	October 21, 1961 – 197x ?	University of Victoria	Greater Victoria, British Columbia, Canada	Inactive	
Omicron 2	February 1964–197x ?	San Jose State College	San Jose, California	Inactive	
Tau	March 14, 1966 – 197x ?	Simon Fraser University	Burnaby, British Columbia, Canada	Inactive	
Psi	April 1967–after 1975	University of California, Irvine	Irvine, California	Inactive	
Phi	January 13, 1968 – 197x ?	Centennial College	Toronto, Ontario, Canada	Inactive	
Nu 2	After 1972 – November 4, 1978	California State University, Northridge	Northridge, California	Inactive	
Gamma 2	1992–xxxx ?	Northern Arizona University	Flagstaff, Arizona	Inactive	
