= Ragnhild Hveger =

Danish swimmer (1920–2011)

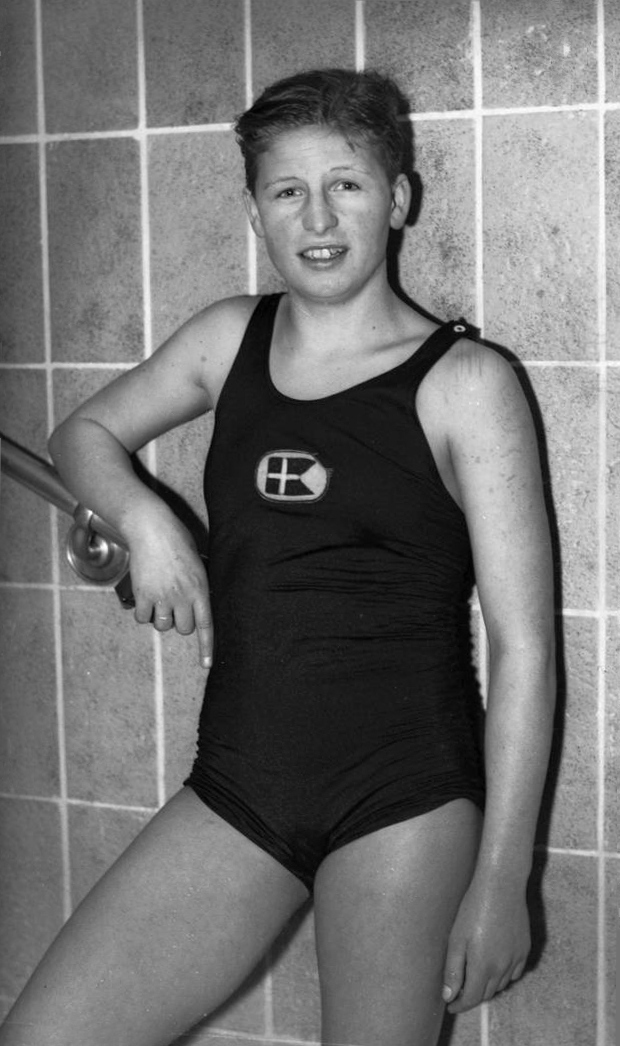
- Ragnhild Hveger in 1935

Personal information
- Born: 10 December 1920 Nyborg, Denmark
- Died: 1 December 2011 (aged 90)

Sport
- Sport: Swimming
- Club: Helsingør Svømmeklub; DKG, København
Medal record
Representing Denmark
Summer Olympics
Silver medal – second place	1936 Berlin	400 m freestyle
European Championships
Gold medal – first place	1938 London	100 m freestyle
Gold medal – first place	1938 London	400 m freestyle
Gold medal – first place	1938 London	4×100 m freestyle

Ragnhild Tove Hveger (later Andersen, 10 December 1920 – 1 December 2011) was a Danish swimmer, who won silver medal in the women's 400 m freestyle at the 1936 Summer Olympics. From 1936 to 1943 she set 44 world records, and at one time she held 19 world records in different distances and disciplines. In 1938 she won three gold medals at the European championships.

Being the daughter of a Nazi, the sister of an Eastern front volunteer, and married to a German officer, she became very unpopular after the war, and was barred from the Danish team for the 1948 Olympics. She competed at the 1952 Olympics and finished fourth in the 4 × 100 m and fifth in the 400 m freestyle events. Hveger retired in 1954 after ending fifth in the 100 m freestyle at the European Championships.

In 1966, she was inducted to the International Swimming Hall of Fame, and 30 years later declared sportswoman of the century by Danmarks Idræts-Forbund.

== Youth (1920-1936) ==
Ragnhild Hveger was born in Nyborg in 1920. Her father was a train driver and a member of the Danish Nazi party. Privately she dreamed about being a nurse but was encouraged by her parent to practise competition swimming. She started competing at the age of 12 and in 1935 at the age of 14, she won her first Nordic championship in 400 m freestyle. She had a smooth stroke technique with effective kicking.

Her club was Elsinor Svimming club.

== Olympic Games in Berlin, 1936 ==
Ragnhild Hveger was one of 18 Danish swimmers at the games. She started in three disciplines. In 100 m freestyle she reached the semifinal and in 4 × 100 m she and the Danish team reached the final where they came seventh. In her favorite discipline 400 m freestyle she won the first heat in a new olympic record and in the semifinal she beat her closest competitor Rie Mastenbroek from the Netherlands. In the final, however, Mastenbroek won and Ragnhild Hveger came second.

The radio helped making her famous. Her final was only the second event in Danish history to be broadcast live on air (the first being a final by another Danish female swimmer, Inge Sørensen, a few days before).

== Achievements ==
Her greatest achievements occurred at the European championships in London 1938. Here she won gold in 100 m freestyle, 400 m freestyle and 4 × 100 m freestyle, which made the British newspaper The Times dubbed her "The Golden Torpedo".

Ragnhild Hveger set 42 individual world records between 1935 and 1942. At the beginning of World War II she was at the peak of her career. In 1941 she held 19 world records in freestyle at the same time.

== World War II and Nazism ==
During most of World War II Denmark was occupied by Germany and the only chance of international competition was against swimmers from Germany or German-occupied countries like the Netherlands.

Hveger moved in 1943 to Kiel in Germany, where she for at time worked as a swimming teacher. At the time she was living with a German soldier she had met in Denmark. According to Ragnhild Hveger he died on a ship outside Danzig. Together they had a daughter which she managed to get with her back to Denmark when the Nazi regime broke down in 1945.

== After the war ==
After the war Ragnhild Hveger was interned for six weeks in Sundholm at a forced labor camp, under suspicion of collaboration with the Germans during the war. Her parents and her brother had been active in the Danish Nazi party. Both her father and her brother fought on the Eastern front and were sentenced to jail, however she was not prosecuted. She nevertheless moved to Sweden for a period.

Her association with Nazism led to her being banned by the Danish swimming association from going to the Olympic Games in London 1948. Officially, the given reason was that she had violated the amateur rules by working as a swimming teacher. She was restricted until 1950.

At the Olympic Games in Helsinki 1952 she participated and came fifth on 400 m freestyle in a time better than her final time from 1936. At that time she was still the recordholder on the distance.

After her swimming career she worked as a coach and swimming teacher in Copenhagen and stayed out of public life.

== Legacy ==
Ragnhild Hvegers performance in swimming have given her a number of awards. In 1966, she was inducted to the International Swimming Hall of Fame at Fort Lauderdale Florida as only one of four Danes. When the Danish Swimming Hall of Fame was created in 2013 she was inducted there too. Likewise she is inducted to the Danish Sport Hall of Fame at its creation in 1992.

== Records ==
Records
Preceded by Rie van Veen	Women's 200 metres freestyle world record holder (long course); 11 September 1938 – 25 February 1956	Succeeded by Dawn Fraser
Preceded by Willy den Ouden	Women's 400 metres freestyle world record holder (long course); 10 February 1937 – 25 August 1956	Succeeded by Lorraine Crapp
Preceded by Lenore Kight	Women's 800 metres freestyle world record holder (long course); 3 July 1936 – 28 June 1953	Succeeded by Valerie Gyenge
Preceded by Grete Frederiksen	Women's 1500 metres freestyle world record holder (long course); 3 July 1938 – 23 July 1955	Succeeded by Lenie de Nijs
Preceded by Nida Senff	Women's 200 metres backstroke world record holder (long course); 14 February 1937 – 17 April 1938	Succeeded by Cor Kint

== See also ==
- Jenny Kammersgaard, Danish long-distance swimmer from the same period
- List of members of the International Swimming Hall of Fame
