= Ray Daughters =

American swimming coach (1895–1967)

- Daughters in 1929

Biographical details
- Born: January 10, 1895; Denver, Colorado, US
- Died: September 16, 1967 (aged 72); Seattle, Washington, US

Playing career
- 1910–1916: Seattle YMCA, Washington Natatorium
- 1916-1930: Crystal Pool Swim Club
- Positions: Freestyle, Butterfly

Coaching career (HC unless noted)
- 1916-1930: Seattle Crystal Pool SC
- 1936, 1948: U.S. Olympic Swim Team; Women's Head Coach
- 1932-1964: US Olympic team adviser (8 Olympics)
- 1930-1964: Washington Athletic Club; Coach, Athletic Director
- 1965-1966: Mercer Island Country Club; Managing Director

Accomplishments and honors

Championships
- 64 National championships (WAC)

Awards
- International Swim. Hall of Fame 1971; American Swim Coaches Hall of Fame

Records
- 30 world records 301 American records (WAC)

Raymond Earl Daughters (January 10, 1895 – September 16, 1967) was an American swimmer and coach. He served for a period as a Chairman of both the AAU and Men's Olympic swimming committee. Between 1930-1964, he led the swim team of the Washington Athletic Club to 64 national championships, 30 world records, and 301 American records. Daughters coached five U.S. medalists in the 1936 and 1956 Olympics who won a total of eight medals, including four gold.

== Early life ==
Daughters was born in on January 10, 1895, in Denver, to William Daughters, a letter carrier, and his wife. The family moved to Seattle in 1910, where Ray would live the remainder of his life. He attended Seattle's Queen Anne High School, where he later noted he was not an exceptional student. Swimming as a child, he specialized in freestyle and butterfly swimming at Seattle's old Washington Natatorium.

== Swimming career ==
In the early 1900s, Daughters won numerous sprint and distance competitions in the Pacific Northwest. When the outstanding men's team from the Illinois Athletic Club—coached by Bill Bachrach—had an exhibition and competition in Seattle in 1914, Daughters captured a second place finish to Illinois Athletic Club swimmer Arthur Raithel of Crane High School, the national 500-yard freestyle champion. Daughters was a swimming champion of the Pacific Northwest. At 18, in early November 1914, he competed with the local YMCA in Seattle placing second in the 25-yard sprint, winning the 50-yard sprint and the dive for distance at 47 yards.

By 1918, he served as a Chief Petty Officer during World War I at the Seattle area's Naval Training Station, where he taught thousands of recruits to swim. He competed in swimming events for the Seattle Naval Training Station in nearby Bremerton, Washington under Athletic Director E.C. Henderson, and placed second in the 50-yard sprint, and third in the plunge for distance, helping to lead the Naval Station to second place in the early rounds of a competition at American Lake, roughly 50 miles South of Seattle, in early August, 1918.

== Coaching ==
Daughters acted as a swimming coach, instructor, and athletic director from 1916-1966, primarily at Seattle's Crystal Pool from 1916 to 1930, then at Seattle's Washington Athletic Club from 1930 to 1964. He took some time away from the Crystal Pool during his military service in WWI. He served as an official, coach, and swimming participant at local swimming events while at the Seattle area's Naval Training Station in Bremerton as early as 1918, where in August he competed and acted as an official and coach at a swim meet at Camp Lewis, a military base near Seattle, and on August 17, 1918 at a meet at the Multinomah Club's pool in Portland, Oregon.

== Crystal pool, Seattle ==
Daughters as Crystal Pool Swimmers Coach, 1924

Daughters started his coaching career in 1916 at the newly constructed Crystal Pool, a large heated salt-water facility with a glass ceiling in an historic Renaissance-style building in downtown Seattle on Second Avenue and Lenora Streets. He participated in a swimming exhibition in a Water Carnival at the Pool in November, 1917, and did basic cleaning, maintenance and some instruction before becoming a full-time coach. By April, 1924, he had assumed the role of Head Coach, and instructor at Crystal Pool, succeeding Coach Don Vickers, who had been Head Coach when Crystal Pool first opened in 1916. Between 1919-1923, Daughters' Crystal Swimming Club won the Pacific Northwest Meet consecutively by considerable margins. In 1921, the Pacific Northwest Association Washington state meet, again won handily by Daughters's Crystal Pool Swimmers, was watched by a crowd of 5000 spectators. Daughters, who was an exceptional eye for spotting latent swimming talent, first discovered and began training a fourteen year-old Helene Madison around 1927, in his earliest years as Head swim coach at Crystal Pools. By 1934, Helene Madison would hold 51 of 62 American freestyle records, and 12 of 16 freestyle world records.

Having officially assumed the position of Assistant Coach at the Crystal Pool, he married the former Maud Barnaby in Los Angeles on March 17, 1923. Daughters was 27 and Barnaby was 24. On September 5, 1921, Daughters had judged the State Water Championship at American Lake where Barnaby had placed third in the women's 50-yard event, and most of the events had been won by Crystal Pool Swimmers.

== Washington Athletic Club ==
In 1930, he was scouted by Athletic Director Darwin Meisnest, to serve as swimming coach and program manager of the Washington Athletic Club on Sixth and Union Streets in downtown Seattle. Athletic Director Meisnest was a former Manager at Washington University who had helped procure funds for the University of Washington's Husky Stadium in 1920. The 101 Club, which was also part of the Washington Athletic Club organization, included many of Seattle's wealthiest citizens, who occasionally acted as athletic sponsors for WAC's more gifted athletes. After over 20 years as a swim Coach and program manager, Daughters was appointed WAC Director of Athletics in 1946.

At the Silver City Water Pageant at Liberty Lake on June 16–17, 1934, Daughters featured several of his best-known Washington Athletic Club swimming proteges including Jack Medica, Olive McKean, Doris Buckley, and Mary Lou Petty. McKean broke Helene Madison's world record with her own record of 3:54.4 in the 300-yard swim. Medica swam 500-yards in a new American Record time of 5:46, and swam 500 meters in a record time of 6:24.6. The Washington Athletic Club women's relay team swam a 2:15.5 for the 220-yard freestyle relay.

During his accomplished tenure as swim coach, Washington Athletic Swimming Club captured 30 world records, 301 American records and placed first in 64 National Championships. As a coach in 1930, Daughters was not a frequent fitness swimmer, but enjoyed surfing as an avocation. In 1935, his women's 4x100 freestyle women's relay team composed WAC swimmers Mary Lou Petty, Betty Lea, Doris Buckley and Olive McKean won the U.S. National Champion in Chicago in world record time, and again won the championship in the same event in 1936.

=== Outstanding swimmers and Olympians ===
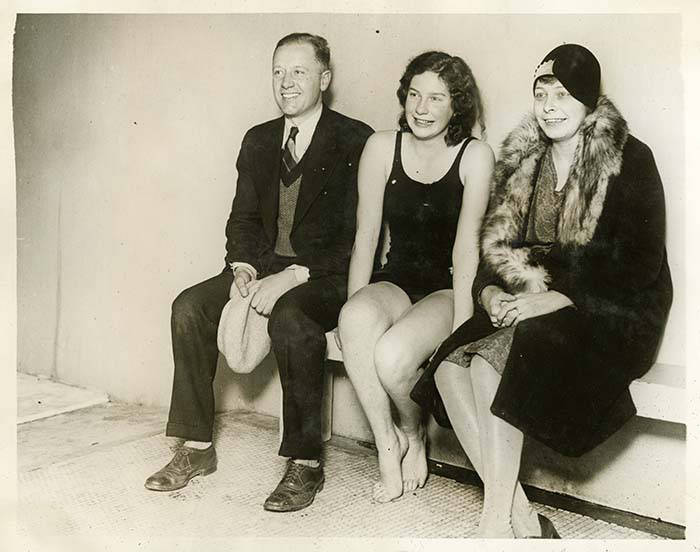
Coach Ray Daughters (left) and Helene Madison (center), 1929

Daughter's outstanding swimmers included 1936 Olympic triple gold medalist Helene Madison, 1956 Olympic silver medalist Nancy Ramey, 1936 Olympic bronze medalist Olive McKean, and 1936 Olympic participant Mary Lou Petty, who placed fourth in her event. Daughter's best known male swimmer was 1936 two-time Olympic gold and silver medalist Jack Medica. Daughter coached 1932 Silver and 1936 Olympic Bronze medalist Lenore Kight at the 1936 Berlin Olympics, but did not coach her during her career. He coached ASCAA Hall of Fame swimmer and Coach Bob Regan at the WAC, a Captain of the swim team at the University of Washington, and in conjunction with Bob Miller, a founding member of the Olympic Swim School in Bellvue, Lake City, and Lynwood, Washington. Daughters also coached Bob Miller, an ASCAA Hall of Fame swimmer and Coach who worked as Washington Athletic Club's Assistant Coach from 1951-1955 and later coached the Olympic Swim Club. Less well known swimmers included Doris Buckley Johnson, and Betty Lea Watson.

== Olympic coach ==
Daughters was active as a swimming coach for the U.S. Olympic team. In the 1936 Berlin, and the 1948 London Olympics, Daughters was Head Coach of the U.S. Women's Team. He was a team manager and photographer at the Rome Olympics in 1960, and served in various capacities as a U.S. Swimming team adviser in eight Olympics from 1932 to 1964.

Daughters supervised each of his swimmers closely, determining their hours to practice and where they would compete. He focused on the importance of conditioning, and stroke rhythm, and was skilled at timing movements and improvements in speed. A frequent newspaper columnist on swimming, he wrote in July 1934, that learning proper pace or maintaining the proper average time per 100-yards would help championship swimmers compete more effectively in distance events. He worked with great attention and care during lengthy practices to improve stroke technique.

=== Swimming community service ===
From 1957 to 1959, he served as the chairman of the AAU Men's Swimming Committee, and in 1960 Chaired the U.S. Men's Olympic Swimming Committee. He managed the Men's Swimming team at the 1960 Olympics in Rome. Daughters also served as the swimming photographer at 1952 Helsinki, 1956 Melbourne, and 1964 Tokyo Olympics.

Nearing retirement in 1965, he briefly served as an athletic director at the Mercer Island Country Club on Mercer Island until his full retirement in 1966 where he lived off Arrowhead Beach on Camano Island in Puget Sound, about 65 miles North of greater Seattle.

After a lengthy illness, Daughters died on September 16, 1967, aged 72, in Seattle.

=== Honors ===
Daughters became a member of the International Swimming Hall of Fame in 1971 and is a member of the American Swimming Coaches Hall of Fame. He became a Pacific Northwest Swimming Hall of Fame honoree in 2004, and a member of the Washington Sports Hall of Fame in 2013. At his retirement banquet in 1964, a Ray Daughters Scholarship Fund was established in his name.
