= Swimming at the 1936 Summer Olympics – Women's 400 metre freestyle =

Women's 400 metre freestyle at the Games of the XI Olympiad
- Venue: Olympiapark Schwimmstadion Berlin
- Date: 13 August 1936 (heats); 14 August 1936 (semifinals); 15 August 1936 (final)
- Competitors: 20 from 10 nations
- Winning time: 5:26.4 OR

Medalists
1st place, gold medalist(s)		Rie Mastenbroek	Netherlands
2nd place, silver medalist(s)		Ragnhild Hveger	Denmark
3rd place, bronze medalist(s)		Lenore Wingard	United States

The women's 400 metre freestyle was a swimming event held as part of the swimming at the 1936 Summer Olympics programme. It was the fourth appearance of the event, which was established in 1924 after 1920 a 300 metre event was held. The competition was held from Thursday to Saturday, 13 to 15 August 1936.

Twenty swimmers from ten nations competed.

== Records ==
These were the standing world and Olympic records (in minutes) prior to the 1936 Summer Olympics.

World record	5:16.0	(Netherlands) Willy den Ouden	Rotterdam (NED)	12 July 1934
Olympic record	5:28.5	(United States) Helene Madison	Los Angeles (USA)	13 August 1932

Ragnhild Hveger set a new Olympic record in the first heat with 5:28.0 minutes. In the final Rie Mastenbroek bettered the Olympic record with 5:26.4 minutes.

== Results ==
=== Heats ===
Thursday 13 August 1936: The fastest three in each heat and the fastest fourth-placed from across the heats advanced to the semi-finals. Only two swimmers competed in heat two therefore only 15 swimmers advanced to the semi-finals.

Heat 1

Place	Swimmer	Time	Qual.
1	Ragnhild Hveger (DEN)	5:28.0	QQ OR
2	Lenore Wingard (USA)	5:34.0	QQ
3	Piedade Coutinho (BRA)	5:35.5	QQ
4	Gladys Morcom (GBR)	6:00.8	
5	Vera Harsányi (HUN)	6:14.7	

Heat 2

Place	Swimmer	Time	Qual.
1	Tini Wagner (NED)	5:57.5	QQ
2	Borbála Sóthy (HUN)	6:14.8	QQ

Heat 3

Place	Swimmer	Time	Qual.
1	Grete Frederiksen (DEN)	5:39.5	QQ
2	Ans Timmermans (NED)	5:42.5	QQ
3	Louisette Fleuret (FRA)	5:46.8	QQ
4	Hatsuko Morioka (JPN)	5:51.0	qq
5	Evelyn de Lacy (AUS)	5:51.9	

Heat 4

Place	Swimmer	Time	Qual.
1	Inger Carlsen (DEN)	5:57.1	QQ
2	Margaret Jeffery (GBR)	6:12.7	QQ
3	Mary Lou Petty (USA)	6:16.6	QQ

Heat 5

Place	Swimmer	Time	Qual.
1	Rie Mastenbroek (NED)	5:38.6	QQ
2	Irma Schrameková (TCH)	5:47.5	QQ
3	Kazue Kojima (JPN)	5:50.4	QQ
4	Ágnes Bíró (HUN)	6:14.3	
5	Scylla Venâncio (BRA)	6:23.0	

=== Semifinals ===
Friday 14 August 1936: The fastest three in each semi-final and the fastest fourth-placed from across the heats advanced to the final. As both fourth placed swimmers set the same time both advanced to the final.

Semifinal 1

Place	Swimmer	Time	Qual.
1	Rie Mastenbroek (NED)	5:40.3	QQ
2	Lenore Wingard (USA)	5:42.2	QQ
3	Grete Frederiksen (DEN)	5:42.5	QQ
4	Tini Wagner (NED)	5:45.9	qq
5	Irma Schrameková (TCH)	5:46.0	
6	Hatsuko Morioka (JPN)	5:49.1	
7	Borbála Sóthy (HUN)	6:11.2	

Semifinal 2

Place	Swimmer	Time	Qual.
1	Ragnhild Hveger (DEN)	5:33.7	QQ
2	Piedade Coutinho (BRA)	5:42.5	QQ
3	Kazue Kojima (JPN)	5:43.5	QQ
4	Mary Lou Petty (USA)	5:45.9	qq
5	Louisette Fleuret (FRA)	5:46.1	
6	Ans Timmermans (NED)	5:49.4	
7	Inger Carlsen (DEN)	5:55.0	
8	Margaret Jeffery (GBR)	6:07.2	

=== Final ===
Saturday 15 August 1936:

Place	Swimmer	Time
1	Rie Mastenbroek (NED)	5:26.4 OR
2	Ragnhild Hveger (DEN)	5:27.5
3	Lenore Wingard (USA)	5:29.0
4	Mary Lou Petty (USA)	5:32.2
5	Piedade Coutinho (BRA)	5:35.2
6	Kazue Kojima (JPN)	5:43.1
7	Grete Frederiksen (DEN)	5:45.0
8	Tini Wagner (NED)	5:46.0
