= Borbála Sóthy =

Hungarian swimmer (born 1916)

Personal information
- Born: 21 December 1916

Sport
- Sport: Swimming

Borbála Sóthy (born 21 December 1916, date of death unknown) was a Hungarian swimmer. She competed in the women's 400 metre freestyle at the 1936 Summer Olympics. Sóthy is deceased.
