= Crystal Pool (Seattle) =

Indoor pool, temple, and boxing venue

Coordinates: 47°36′44″N 122°20′35″W

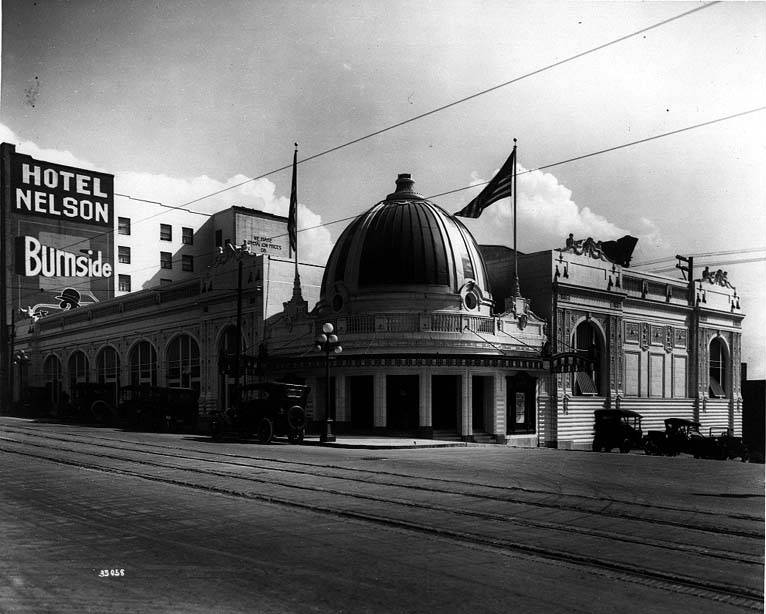
The Crystal Pool in 1916

Crystal Pool Natatorium was a saltwater indoor swimming pool in Seattle, Washington. It was eventually adapted and became the building of the Bethel Temple Pentecostal Church. It was designed by B. Marcus Priteca and built from 1915 to 1918. The pool was covered with boards and the venue used for boxing or roller skating.

The building was later demolished in 2003 and replaced with a condominium complex called Crystalla.

== Description ==
The complex was designed for C. D. Stimson by Marcus Priteca. Upon its debut, the Italian Renaissance architecture facility was described as having outdone the Baths of Rome. The total cost of its construction was approximately $200,000 (equivalent to $5,917,431 in 2025).

It had arched steel trusses and a glass roof. Its facade included terracotta features and it had a dome. Water was pumped in from the Puget Sound's Elliott Bay. The 260,000 gallon pool was heated. It was in the Belltown District.

== History ==
In 1918, the pool's adjoining energy plant was converted from burning oil to burning a form of powdered coal. A contemporaneous article in Electrical World magazine reported that it was to become the first of its kind (a small plant isolated from others) to transition to powdered coal. It received the coal by truck, and was described as not having a "slag pit" for its byproducts.

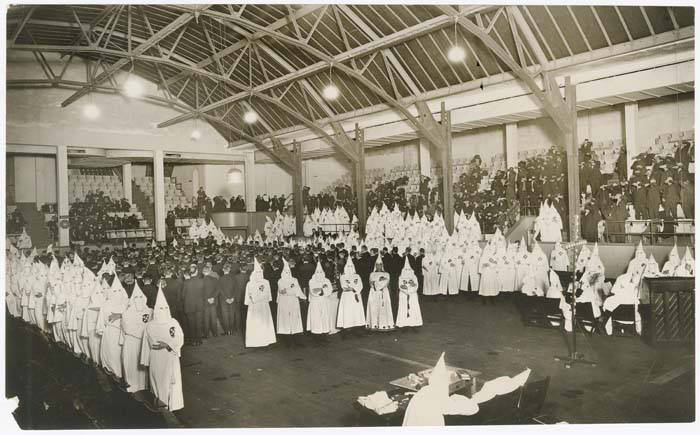
Klansmen at the Crystal Pool in 1923

In February 1923, the Young Men's Republican Club of King County organized a Lincoln Banquet at the Crystal Pool Auditorium. In March 23, 1923, the Ku Klux Klan held a rally at the venue. At the time, Seattle was segregated with covenants to restrict where minorities could live and sundown restrictions kept them out of white neighborhoods after working hours. The Klan event was one of several held around Washington in 1923 and 1924.

=== Crystal Pool swimming team ===
Hall of Fame Coach Ray Daughters assumed the role of Head Swimming coach for the Crystal Pool team in 1924, succeeding Coach Don Vickers, who had been Head Coach when Crystal Pool first opened in 1916. Daughters had begun work as a swimming instructor and clerk at Crystal Pool in 1916. Between 1919-1923, Vickers's and Daughters's Crystal Swimming Club won the Pacific Northwest Championship meet consecutively by considerable margins, and had many outstanding swimmers and divers. Daughters, who was an exceptional eye for spotting latent swimming talent, first discovered and began training a fourteen year-old Helene Madison around 1927, in his earliest years as Head swim coach at Crystal Pools. By 1934, Helene Madison would hold 51 of 62 American freestyle records, and 12 of 16 freestyle world records, and had won three Olympic Gold medals in the 1932 Los Angeles Olympics. 1936 Berlin Olympic bronze medalist Olive McKean was another Olympian who began her career being coached by Daughters and Vickers at Crystal Pool.

In 1924, U. S. Navy swimmers from the battleships USS California and USS New Mexico competed at the pool.

William H. Offler bought the building in 1944 and converted it into Bethel Temple, permanently covering the pool with flooring. The entrance was on the corner of 2nd Avenue and Lenora Street.

=== Boxing ===
Crystal Pool was also used as a venue for boxing matches. Wooden planks and flooring were placed to cover the pool. Boxer Leslie Earnest "Wildcat" Carter was photographed at the Crystal Pool. A match between Tony Seeman and Abie Israel was held at Crystal Pool on December 17, 1930. Promoter Nate Druxman organized fights at the venue where he established an athletic club. Hal Hoshino fought at the venue. Ken Overlin and Paul Delaney also fought at the venue.

== Demolition and replacement ==
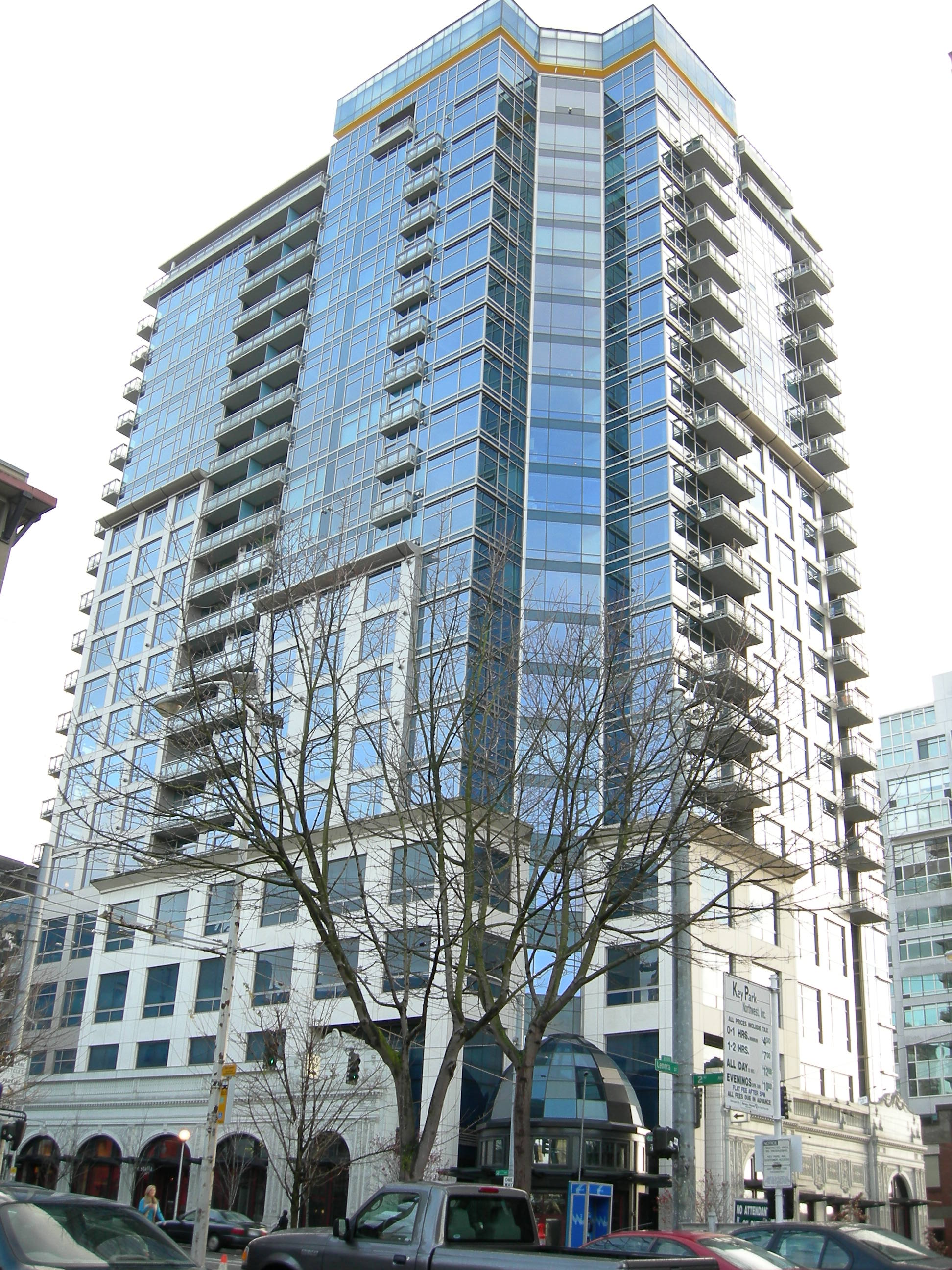
Crystalla

The building was razed in June 2003, and replaced with a 24-story condominium complex called Crystalla. Most of the original terracotta façade was preserved and rebuilt in place. A small glass dome calling back to the original one lost during the building's time as Bethel Temple was placed over the current building's corner entrance.
