= Louisette Fleuret =

French swimmer

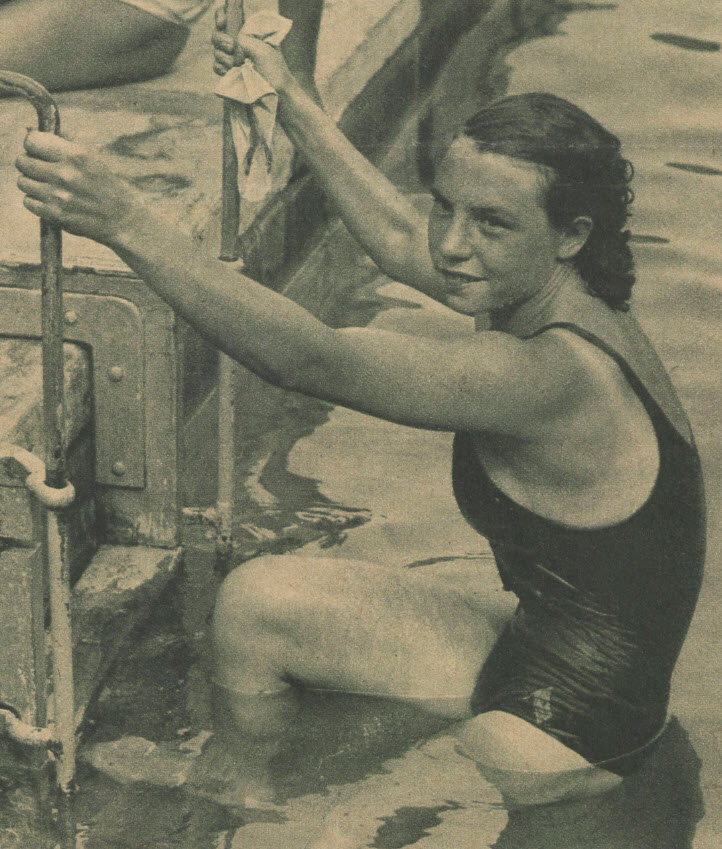
- Louisette Fleuret in 1937

Personal information
- Nationality: French
- Born: 29 April 1919 Paris, France
- Died: 3 December 1965 (aged 46)

Sport
- Sport: Swimming

Louisette Fleuret (29 April 1919 – 3 December 1965) was a French swimmer. She competed in the women's 400 metre freestyle at the 1936 Summer Olympics.
