= Mary Lou Petty =

American swimmer

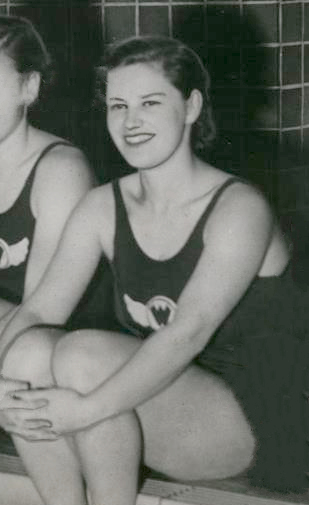
- Petty in February, 1936, in the winged "W" suit of Spokane's Washington Athletic Club from a group photo taken at the Northwest Invitational Meet in Seattle

Personal information
- Full name: Mary Lou Petty -Skok
- National team: United States
- Born: April 5, 1915 Spokane, Washington, U.S.
- Died: April 2, 2014 (aged 98) Tempe, Arizona, U.S.
- Spouse: Dr. Robert Gleason Skok (m. 1936)
- Children: 2 daughters

Sport
- Sport: Swimming
- Events: 4x100 freestyle relay 220, 500-yard freestyle 400-meter freestyle
- Strokes: Freestyle
- Club: Spokane Women's Athletic Club; Washington Athletic Club, Seattle
- Coach: Margaret Mahoney (Spokane Athletic); Ray Daughters (Washington AC); Ray Daughters (36 Olympics)

Mary Lou Petty (April 5, 1915 – April 2, 2014), also known by her married name Mary Lou Skok, was an American competition swimmer who competed for the Washington Athletic Club and participated in the 1936 Berlin Olympics, where she placed fourth in the women's 400-meter freestyle event. She married future Optometrist Robert Gleason Skok in 1936, had two daughters in Spokane and worked for Lockheed during WWII after a move to Los Angeles. The family spent several summers at the family's Gleason Ranch, in Brady, Washington, where they farmed and raised cattle. Moving to Tempe, Arizona in 1949, Mary Lou pursued golf as an avocation, winning senior titles in 1966 and 1970. She remained physically active throughout her life.

== Early life ==
Petty was born April 5, 1915 in Spokane, Washington to mother Mary F. Watkins Petty and father Walter E. Petty Sr. She was an adept swimmer by the age of 8 and began swimming competitively at the age of 13. In Spokane, she swam for the Spokane Women's Athletic Club under Coach Margaret Mahoney. Mary Lou graduated Spokane's Lewis and Clark High School in 1933 where in January of her Senior year she was elected President of the Girl's Federation. She had originally prepared to compete in the 1932 Summer Olympics, but the failure of her family's business during the Great Depression prevented her from acquiring the necessary financial backing. After becoming engaged to Bob Skok and taking a job as a secretary at Montgomery Ward, she moved to Seattle around the age of 18 in 1934 to swim for the strong program at the Washington Athletic Club where she would be coached by Ray Daughters, a Swimming Hall of Fame Inductee. Receiving strong coaching and training in Seattle, she later qualified for the 400-meter freestyle at the 1936 trials in New York, winning a birth on the U.S. Women's team for the 1936 Summer Olympics. During this inter-Olympic period, between 1932 and 1936, she set several national records.

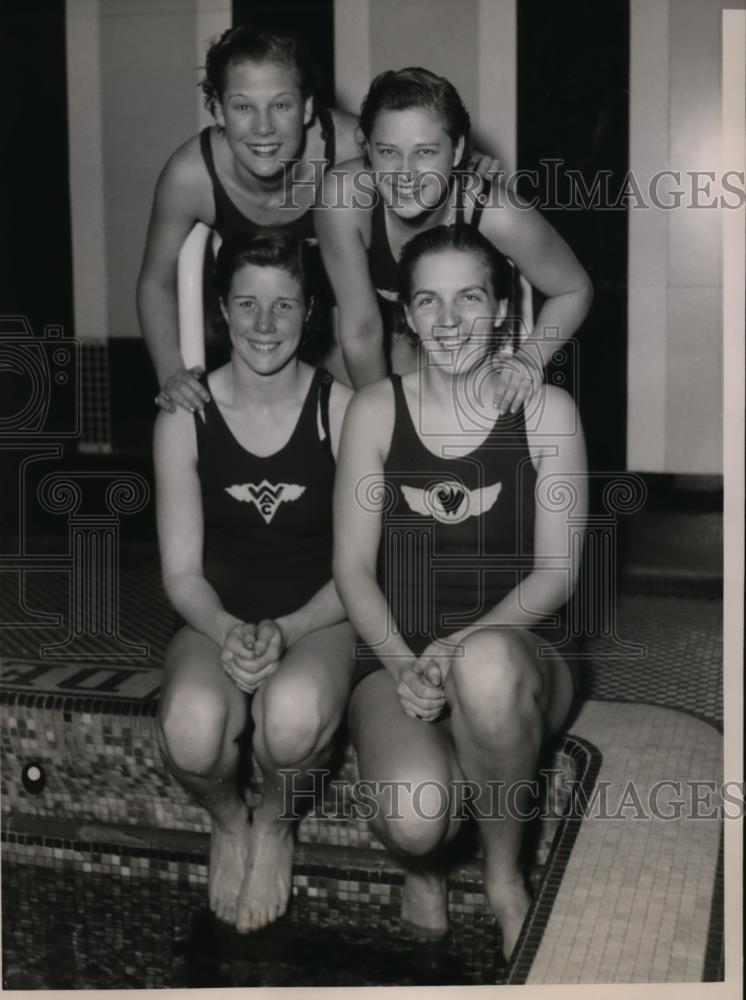
Rear L to R;Doris Buckley, Mary Lou Petty, Front L to R;Betty Lea, Olive McKean, April, 1936 4x100 team

She swam on the AAU champion team for Seattle's Washington Athletic Club in both 1935 and 1936 that won the 4 x 200 freestyle relay at the AAU National Championship. In 1936, she placed first at the AAU Indoor National Championsips in both the 220 yards and 500 yard freestyle.

Representing the Washington Athletic Club on April 2, 1936 she was part of the team that broke the world record for the 4x100-yard relay event at the National AAU Championship in Chicago, Illinois, with a time of 4:13.4 seconds. The team consisted of Washington Athletic Club swimmers Doris Buckley and Marry Lou Petty, Betty Lea, and Olive McKean.

== 1936 Berlin Olympics ==
She competed at the 1936 Berlin Olympics under Head U.S. Women's Olympic Coach Ray Daughters, having received funds from Seattle's Elks and Athletic Round Table that financed her trip to the 1936 trials in New York. At the Berlin Olympics, she placed fourth in the 400-meter freestyle event with a time of 5:32.2, slightly over three seconds from contending for a medal. Rie Mastenbroek of the Netherlands won the gold with a time of 5:26.4, Ragnhild Hveger of Denmark won the silver with a time of 5:27.5, and American Lenore Kite-Wingard won the bronze with a time of 5:29.0. Her roommate on the boat to Berlin was Eleanor Holm Jarrett. Despite food poisoning, Mary Lou managed to place fourth in the competition and later recalled observing both German Leader Adolf Hitler and athlete Jesse Owens at the Games.

=== Marriage and later life ===
Upon her return to New York from Berlin in 1936, she married fiance Robert Gleason Skok at New York's St. Patrick's Cathedral on August 29, 1936. The couple eventually moved to Los Angeles after the birth of their two daughters in Spokane. In Los Angeles, husband Bob Skok attended school to pursue Optometry as a career. While in Los Angeles, during World War II, Mary Lou worked for Lockheed where she helped build wings for the Lockheed Hudson bomber. She and Bob Skok remained together after marrying until his death on March 27, 1998. After the war the family moved to Tempe, Arizona in 1949 where husband Bob Skok started an Optometry practice. Mary Lou spent several summers in Washington, where she and her family raised beef cattle at the family's Gleason Ranch in Brady, Washington. After their 1949 move to Tempe, Mary Lou and her husband helped found Rolling Hills Golf Club, and were long time members of the Mesa Country Club.

After her move to Arizona, Mary Lou pursued golf as a sport, winning Arizona State Women's Golf Association Senior titles in both 1966 and 1970.

Mary Lou Petty Skok died on April 2, 2014, at the age of 98 at Friendship Village, a retirement community in Tempe, Arizona, where she had lived since 1999 and frequently cooked and volunteered. She was predeceased by her daughter Barbara Lee and husband Dr. Robert G. Skok, but survived by her daughter Helen Skok, several grandchildren and seventeen great grandchildren. Services were held at Skirm Auditorium in Friendship on the morning of April 19, 2014, with additional memorial celebration held at the Gleason Ranch on the afternoon of June 27.

=== Honors ===
In 1974, Skok was the first female athlete inducted into the Inland Northwest Sports Hall of Fame, and was made a member of the Pacific Northwest Swimming Hall of Fame in 2006 in Seattle.
