= Lenore Kight =

American swimmer (1911–2000)

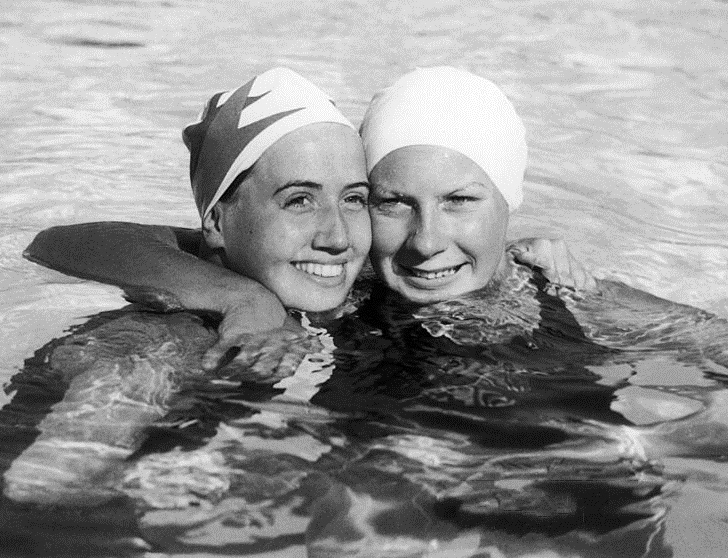
- 400-meter silver medalist Kight (left) and gold medalist Helene Madison at the 1932 Olympics

Personal information
- Full name: Lenore M. Kight
- National team: United States
- Born: September 26, 1911 Frostburg, Maryland, US
- Died: February 9, 2000 (aged 88) Cincinnati, Ohio, US
- Spouse: Cleon Wingard Sr. m. 1935

Sport
- Sport: Swimming
- Strokes: Freestyle
- Club: Carnegie Library Athletic Club; Homestead, PA
Medal record
Women's swimming
Representing the United States
Olympic Games
Silver medal – second place	1932 Los Angeles	400 m freestyle
Bronze medal – third place	1936 Berlin	400 m freestyle

Lenore M. Kight (September 26, 1911 – February 9, 2000), known by her married name Lenore Wingard after 1935, was an American competition swimmer for the Carnegie Library Athletic fund and an Olympic medalist in the 400 meter freestyle who represented the United States at the 1932 Los Angeles and 1936 Berlin Summer Olympics.

Lenore Kight was born September 26, 1911 to Clarence Onley Kite and Mary Katherine Lehr Kight near the Northern Pennsylvania border in Frostburg, Maryland, though when she was five the family moved North, to Homestead, Pennsylvania near Pittsburgh. Kite considered herself a late starter, teaching herself to swim at the age of 14. A local Pittsburgh coach soon noted her skills and got her into a swimming program with the Carnegie Library Athletic Club, where she progressed from local to state and then national competition. Recognized as an outstanding competitor, she was ready for Olympic competition by 21.

During her amateur career, while primarily swimming for the Carnegie Library Athletic Club, also known as the Homestead Library Athletic Club under Coach Jack Scarry through 1935, she set 7 world and 24 national records, and won 23 national swimming titles. In a noteworthy career, she captured both the 1 mile and 440 National AAU freestyle, for four successive years. In 1933 she won all of the U.S. AAU National Championship title events in the freestyle.

== Olympic medals ==
=== 1932 Olympics ===
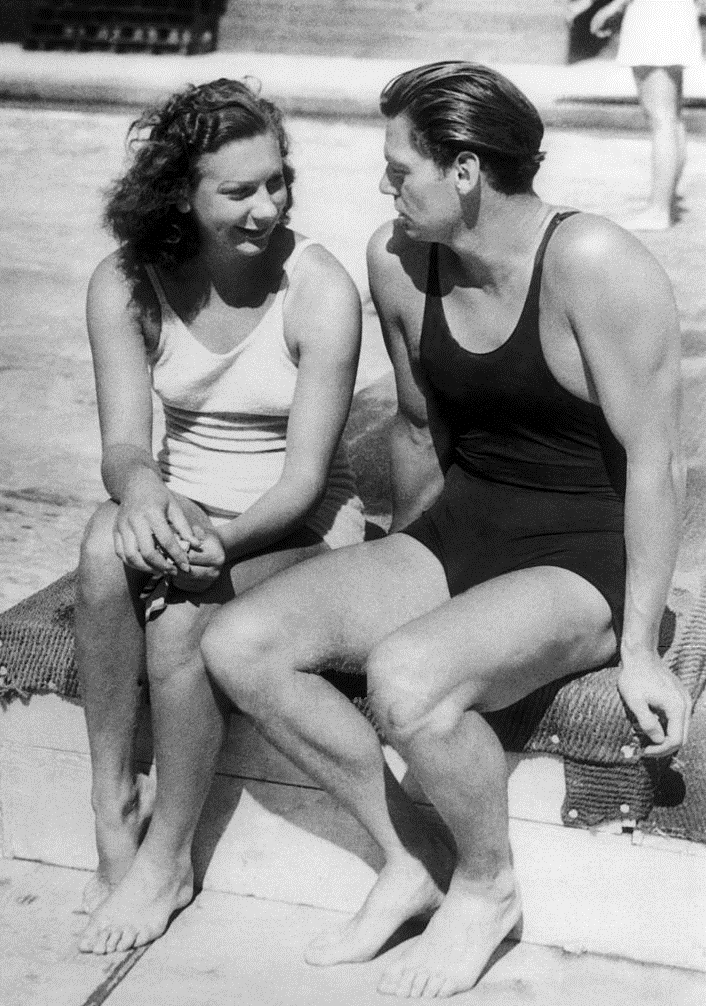
Helene Madison and Johnny Weissmuller, 1932 Olympics

In what was likely her most publicized single performance, at the 1932 Summer Olympics in Los Angeles, she won a silver medal in the women's 400-meter freestyle event bettering the former world record with a time of 5:28.6. In a close race, gold medalist, and American teammate Helene Madison led Kight until the last 100 meters, when Kight overtook Madison. The two battled it out in the final length of the pool. In a very tight race, Madison, who set the new world record touched only a tenth of a second ahead of silver medalist Kight.

=== Marriage ===
Kight was engaged to be married to Cleon Wingard Senior in July 1935. On September 4, 1935, she eloped and married in Wellsburg, West Virginia, then moved to Cincinnati with Wingard, a former graduate of the University of Pittsburgh, who had a career as a physical education instructor, teacher, and high school principal. In Cincinnati, Wingard worked as a physical education instructor in the Cincinnati Schools. Due to her move to Cincinnati, Kight-Wingard left the Carnegie Library Athletic Club, and named her husband Cleon Wingard as her new manager. Cleon Wingard would become the founder of the "Neediest Kids of All" Charity.

=== 1936 Olympics ===
The following year at the 1936 Summer Olympics in Berlin, Kite Wingard won a bronze medal in the 400-meter freestyle event with a time of 5:29.0. She finished only around 1.5 seconds behind the silver medalist Ragnhild Hveger from Denmark. At the 1936 Olympics, Kight was coached by Ray Daughters of the Washington Athletic Club, who served as Head coach of the women's Olympic team that year. Daughters also coached triple gold medalist Helene Madison at the Olympics that year, and had coached her throughout her career.

=== Post-Olympic swimming career ===
In 1937 she turned professional and won the long-distance race at the Toronto Canadian Exhibition, as well as Cleveland's Bernard McFadden professional race.

=== Honors ===
Kight-Wingard won the prestigious James E. Sullivan Award, given to "the most outstanding athlete at the collegiate or Olympic level in the United States", and in 1981 was inducted into the International Swimming Hall of Fame in Fort Lauderdale. She is also a member of the Pennsylvania Sports Hall of Fame, was the first woman to become a member of the Maryland Athletic Hall of Fame, and is a member of the HELMS Hall of Fame.

=== Instructing and age group competition ===
After retiring from active competitions, Kight-Wingard worked as a swimming instructor, giving private lessons to students at pools in Cincinnati from 1959-79. During summers, she directed the swim program and managed the pool at Pittsburgh's Deer Creek where her husband Cleon had also worked as an instructor. She continued to set age group records through the age of 75 as a United States Masters swimming competitor. Through 1995, into her early 80's she swam regularly at the YMCA in the Cincinnati suburb of Westwood, Ohio.

A resident of College Hill, Kight died at the age of 88 after a long bout with Alzheimer's disease on February 9, 2000, at Mercy Franciscan Hospital-Mount Airy Campus in Cincinnati, Ohio.

== See also ==
- List of members of the International Swimming Hall of Fame
- List of Olympic medalists in swimming (women)
