= Jan de Kreek =

Dutch footballer

- De Kreek (Netherlands-Belgium, 1930)

Personal information
- Date of birth: 11 October 1903
- Date of death: 14 February 1988 (aged 84)

International career
Years	Team	Apps	(Gls)
1930	Netherlands	3	(0)

Jan de Kreek (11 October 1903 – 14 February 1988) was a Dutch footballer. He played in three matches for the Netherlands national football team in 1930.
