= Victor Erroelen =

Belgian footballer

Personal information
- Date of birth: 23 December 1916
- Date of death: 22 February 1988 (aged 71)

International career
Years	Team	Apps	(Gls)
1948	Belgium	4	(0)

Victor Erroelen (23 December 1916 – 22 February 1988) was a Belgian footballer. He played in four matches for the Belgium national football team in 1948.
