= Washington Athletic Club =

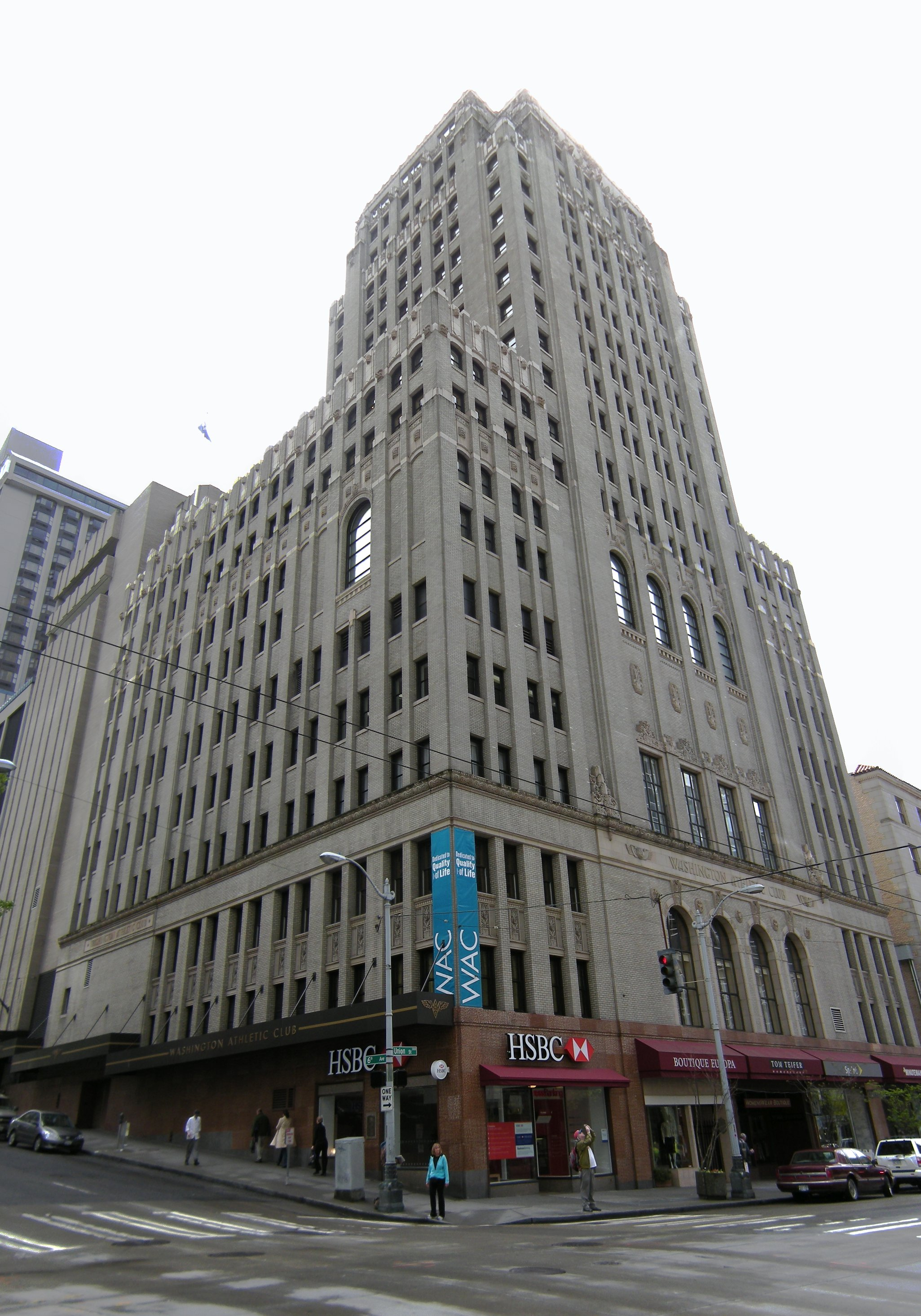

- Location within Downtown Seattle

General information
- Type: athletic club, hotel
- Location: 1325 6th Avenue, Seattle, United States
- Coordinates: 47.609783°N 122.333661°W
- Completed: 1930
- Cost: $2.5 million

Height
- Roof: 76.20 m (250.0 ft)
- Top floor: 70.72 m (232.0 ft)

Technical details
- Floor count: 21
- Floor area: 305,548 sq ft (28,386.3 m^{2})
- Lifts/elevators: 5

Design and construction
- Architects: Sherwood D. Ford

Seattle Landmark
- Designated: April 15, 2009

The Washington Athletic Club, founded in 1930, is a private social and athletic club located in downtown Seattle. The 21-story WAC clubhouse opened in December 1930, and was designed in the Art Deco style by Seattle architect Sherwood D. Ford.

The five-story WAC includes a 25-yard pool, full-size basketball court, running track, handball and racquetball courts, and pilates and yoga studios. The top ten floors house the Inn at the WAC, a 109-room boutique hotel. The club also offers a full-service day spa and a wellness center with nutrition, physical therapy, and naturopathic services. The building is also home to three restaurants, a private ballroom, social areas, and numerous meeting spaces.

The idea of the Century 21 Exposition was first conceived by club members within the building in January 1955.

In 2009, the Washington Athletic Club became a City of Seattle Landmark, and in 2018 its 6th Street building was listed on the National Register of Historic Places.

== History ==
=== Club's early formation and plans ===
In mid 1927, Seattle newcomer and realtor Noel B. Clarke put together a committee of Seattle attorneys, capitalists and bankers to raise money to form a new athletic club to serve the city's skyrocketing population. They began soliciting $100 founders' memberships to hire an architect and construct a clubhouse and by early 1928 over 1,000 had been collected. Funds were stored in a trust that couldn't be accessed until 2,000 memberships were sold. In February 1928, Clarke announced a 120 x 96' site had been chosen at the corner of 6th and University Streets. The committee hired the Seattle architectural firm of Baker, Vogel & Roush to design a building. Their plans were of an elegant twelve-story structure with Gothic Revival influences. The building would cost around $1 million and construction was to begin in June 1928. By March 1928, only 1,200 of the needed 2,000 members had signed up for the new club, causing a delay in the plans. More troubles arose in May 1928 when Clarke, the club's biggest single promoter, quit the board because of difficulties dealing with the Seattle Real Estate Board.

After the passing of the original construction deadline, a new board of 26 of Seattle's most prominent businessmen came together to continue Clarke's work. The new committee chose to scrap the club's original design, now becoming dated, and hired architect Sherwood D. Ford to design something different at a new site chosen at the southwest corner of 6th Avenue and Union Street, owned by W.D. Comer, then president of the club and a holder of major financial interest. Ford's first proposal was for an elaborate 12-story building in the Mission Revival Style, unique to the region and similar in style to Seattle's Fox Theatre that Ford would later design. A large enclosed swimming pool would be located on the roof and, according to a rendering published in the August 23, 1928 issue of the Seattle Times, would have closely resembled the grand hall of Seattle's Union Station.

With the club finally reaching its membership quota, their impounded funds were made available for use and an October 1928 date was proposed for construction to begin. In late September 1928, plans had changed again and club officials brought in Kenneth McCleod, manager of the Olympic Club in San Francisco, to consult with architect Ford to re-design the building in a way that would make optimal use of the lot. After an inspection of the site, Ford & McLeod left for an extended trip across the country to inspect and tour other metropolitan athletic clubs and gather ideas for the new design.

=== New plans and construction ===
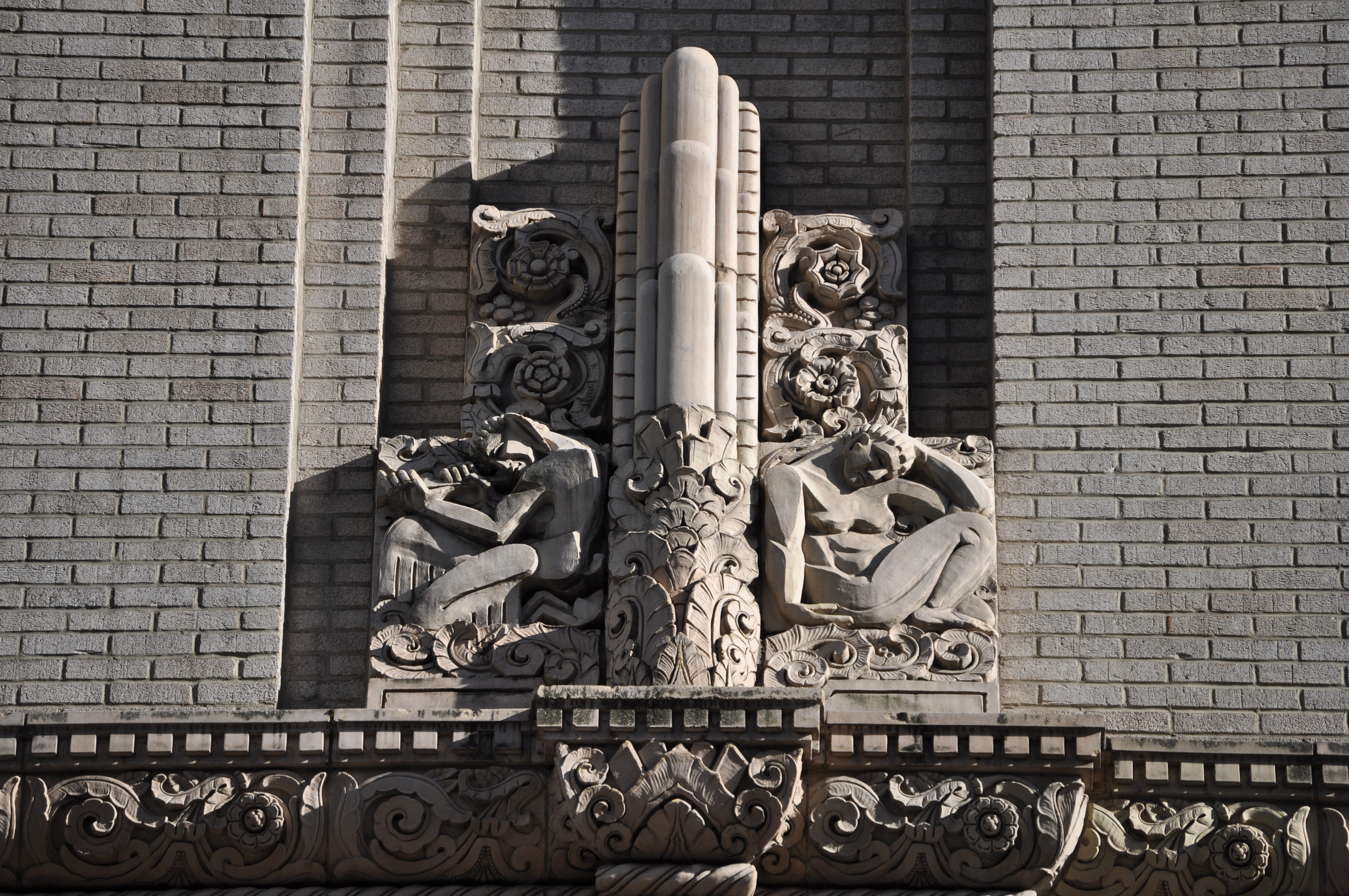
An architectural detail on the building's facade

Sherwood Ford's findings resulted in a new set of plans for a structure priced at $2.3 million. The new design was of an imposing 21-story art deco skyscraper with a central tower. It would be constructed of reinforced concrete and steel while the exterior consisted of brick and decorative terracotta tile and would be completely fireproof. Ford announced in a board meeting that the clubhouse "will be the very last word in structures of this kind and will rank among the best found anywhere." Additional financing was secured and Comer announced that construction would finally begin for sure by the end of 1929. The site at Sixth and Union, previously leased by the club from A.M. Goldstein and Dorn & Derneden, was officially purchased on October 30 and razing of the buildings on the site began 30 days later.

While the Stock Market Crashed in October 1929, Seattle wouldn't immediately feel the effects and construction went ahead. The groundbreaking ceremony was held on Monday, December 16, 1929 at noon when a steam shovel driven by Reginald H. Parsons, chairman of the board of governors for the club, overturned the first load of dirt. City officials as well as club members and presidents of neighboring clubs were in attendance. The event was followed by a luncheon for board members at the Olympic Hotel.

Construction commenced immediately with the steel structure of the building. The Wallace Bridge Company, who also constructed the structures of the Harborview Medical Center in Seattle and the St. Johns Bridge in Portland, Oregon, manufactured and assembled the building's steel frame. Over 1,200 tons of steel was used in construction with the beams over the main ballroom weighing 18 tons each. The steel frame was then encased in concrete. Tragedy struck on April 26, 1930 when Albert J. Triggs, superintendent for the Sound Construction Company was crushed to death when a section of the concrete structure collapsed on top of him. The steel frame was mostly completed by July and the brick sheathing followed soon after. By late December 1930 the building would be complete at a total cost of $2.5 million.

=== Grand opening and design ===
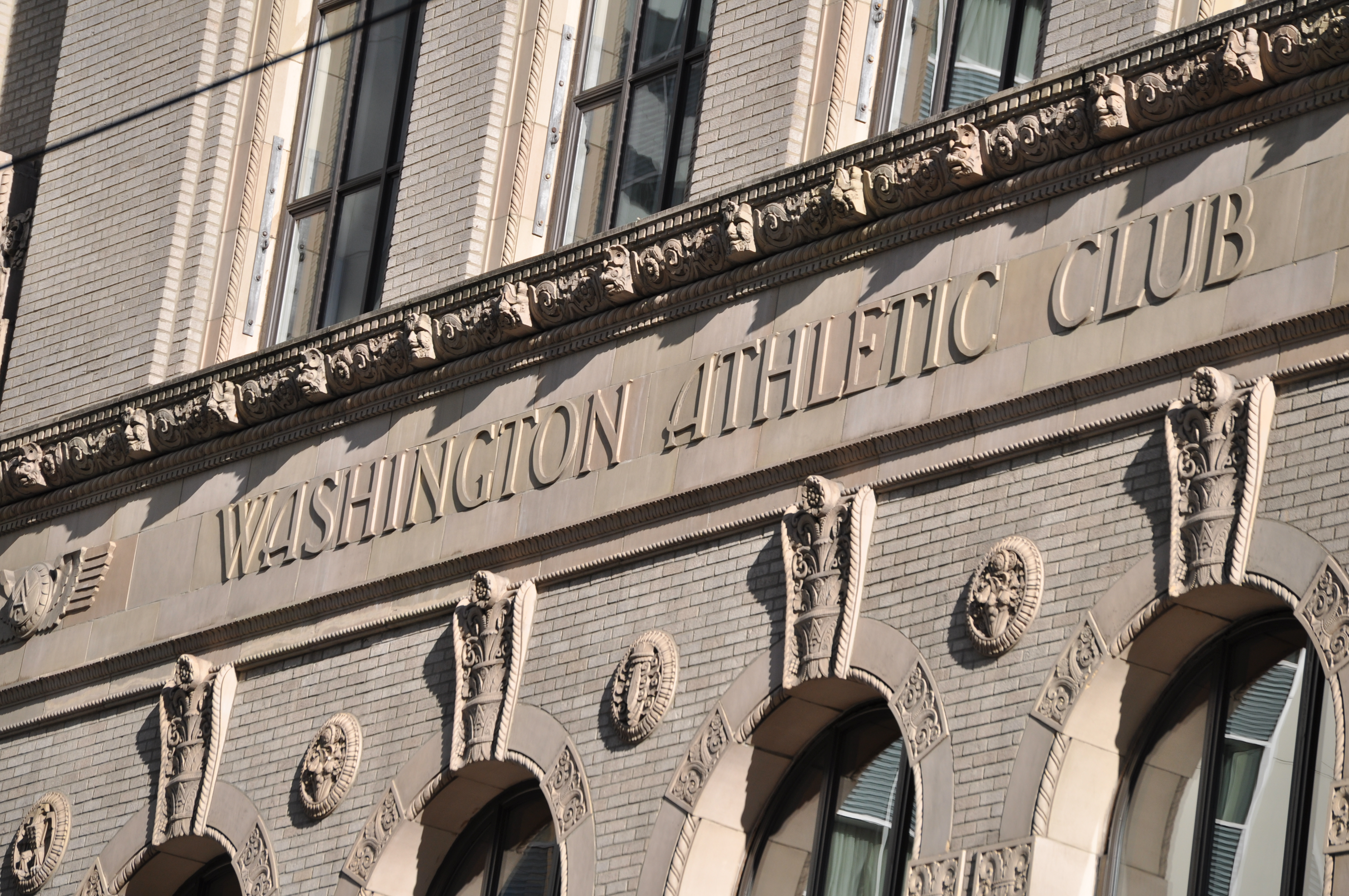
View of details on north facade

The Washington Athletic Club officially opened on December 16, 1930 followed by a week long celebration of dining, dancing and facility touring. Upon completion, the club, dubbed 'the skyscraper of sports' by local media, made a major addition to Seattle's skyline and was even erroneously said to be taller than Seattle's other art deco skyscraper, the Northern Life Tower. While the latter contained seven more floors, the W.A.C.'s floors were claimed to be taller. Of special note at the time was that out of superstition, the building had no 13th floor, or at least according to the elevators buttons which skipped from 12 to 14.

A full-page article in the Seattle Times from December 16, described the layout of the new building in detail:

Entering from Sixth Avenue members will see a commodious lobby richly furnished and impressively decorated. The men's lounge is beyond. Antiques and brilliant tapestries add a restful tone to the room. At the north end of the lounge is a comfortable library decorated and furnished in a more subdued motif.

Women were largely segregated from men in the new quarters, having their own entrance and elevator as described by the article:

Allegorical incidents of Persian history are told on the walls of the woman's bridge room on the second floor. The woman's lounge is entirely of French motif. The third floor, too is devoted to the feminine membership. Graceful crystal chandeliers are the outstanding features of the woman's dining room off of which open five private dining rooms. Women members reach their club quarters by their own elevator.

The fourth floor contained the men's grill restaurant while the above that were the men's area including most of the athletic aspects of the club:

The gymnasium has every muscle and bodybuilding device obtainable. Locker rooms, showers, artificial sun rooms and mechanical equipment are of the finest.

The entire seventh and eighth floors were occupied by the swimming pool while the ninth floor, the top floor of the building's base section, contained sleeping rooms for guests of club members. The twelve story tower contained 125 hotel-like rooms "for the use of club members" while a conference room occupied the very top floor.

The Athletic club soon became the social epicenter of Washington's athletic community and hosted many luncheons and social gatherings. The club also became a center for training local athletes for professional careers as well as for the Olympics. The club enthusiastically hired Ray Daughters, swimming coach at the Crystal Pool Natatorium. He was followed to the club by his young protege, Helene Madison. The club's pool would later be named in her honor.

=== Financial troubles and the Great Depression ===
The Great Depression began to affect many social clubs across the nation who saw their memberships begin to taper off and the wave soon reached the west coast. Within a short time of opening, some 500 members withdrew from the club because of the shock to their finances. It was reported that in the first three months, the club was losing $10,000 a month. In 1931, W.D. Comer became caught up in the backlash from the financial crash and was sent to jail. The club was threatened with receivership and under the decision of judge Howard M. Finlay, reorganization was begun.

The WAC building was purchased by Seattle businessmen Victor Elfendahl, Gilbert Skinner and William Edris. They refinanced the club and exchanged third mortgage bonds for preferred stock. Seeing tight times ahead, they tried to make their club more friendly to more people. Several measures taken by the new owners included offering more moderately priced items in the restaurant, creating more family oriented functions, and adding more card rooms and a quiet room. Due to the club's large size, it was made known by the owners that it could only be operated with full membership. In an attempt to stay in business, the owners began an aggressive new premium membership program, hoping to sign on 1,200 new members which luckily was a quick success.

During the 1936 Olympics in Berlin, the Washington Athletic Club and University of Washington were represented by 23 athletes, one of which was swimmer Jack Medica, who set a new world record of 4:44:5 in the 400 m freestyle.

=== 1940s to today ===
In May 1940, Eddie Bauer moved his fast-growing sporting goods business into the ground floor retail spaces of the building, his fourth move in little more than five years. The store later moved again to third and Virginia Streets.

By the end of World War II, a historic decision was made by the club membership to buy the building from its owner, The Washington Athletic Club Holding Co., who had been renting the building to them since 1936 at a rate of $12,500 a month, for $1.35 million. Even though the payments would follow the same rate as the rent, the wealthy club members would own the building within 5 and a half years.

By the 1950s, the club was beginning to outgrow its old building, now overflowing with use by over 5,000 members. In August 1953, The Washington Athletic club purchased the property to the south on which to build a three-story annex, designed by architect Harrison Overturf, which broke ground on June 24, 1954. The original building also received a major interior remodeling by interior decorator Lou Garner Swift in 1955. The new addition opened in time for the club's Silver Jubilee in 1955. An additional eight stories were added to the annex in 1970 along with further interior remodeling. The original 6th street entrance was moved into the new building and the old lobby was closed; the original 3-story entrance arch was removed entirely to avoid confusion.

By 2000, the WAC had over 21,000 members and claims to have the largest membership of any health club in the country. As of today, the building houses the successful "Inn at the WAC" on the upper floors as well as gym space. The club is still the site of numerous social gatherings, lectures and is especially popular for business meetings.

In July 2007, the WAC Building was one of 38 surveyed buildings in and around downtown Seattle deemed eligible for landmark status. It became official on April 9, 2010.

== See also ==
- Seattle Athletic Club
- List of American gentlemen's clubs
- List of landmarks in Seattle

== Gallery ==
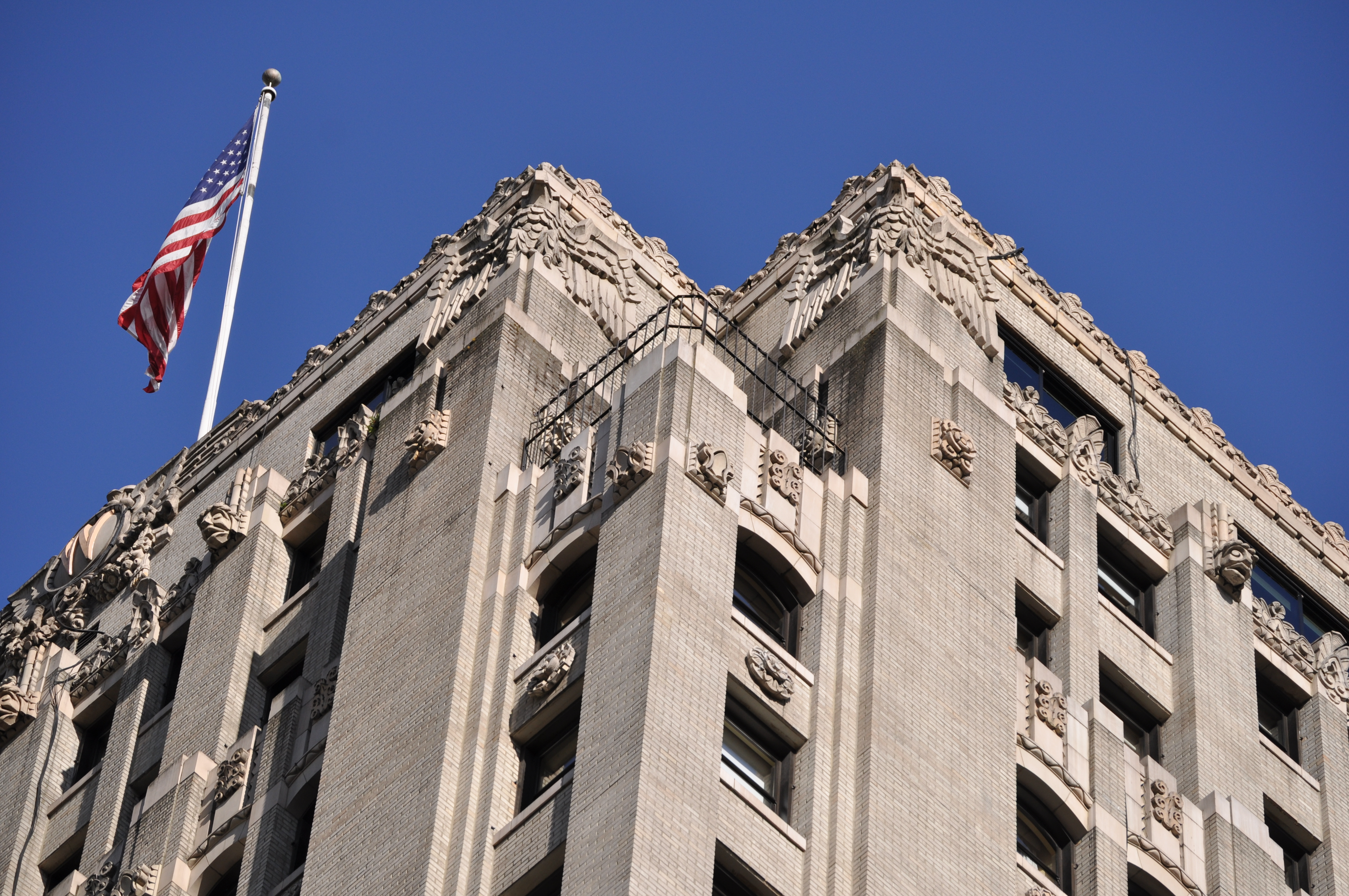
View of roof-line details

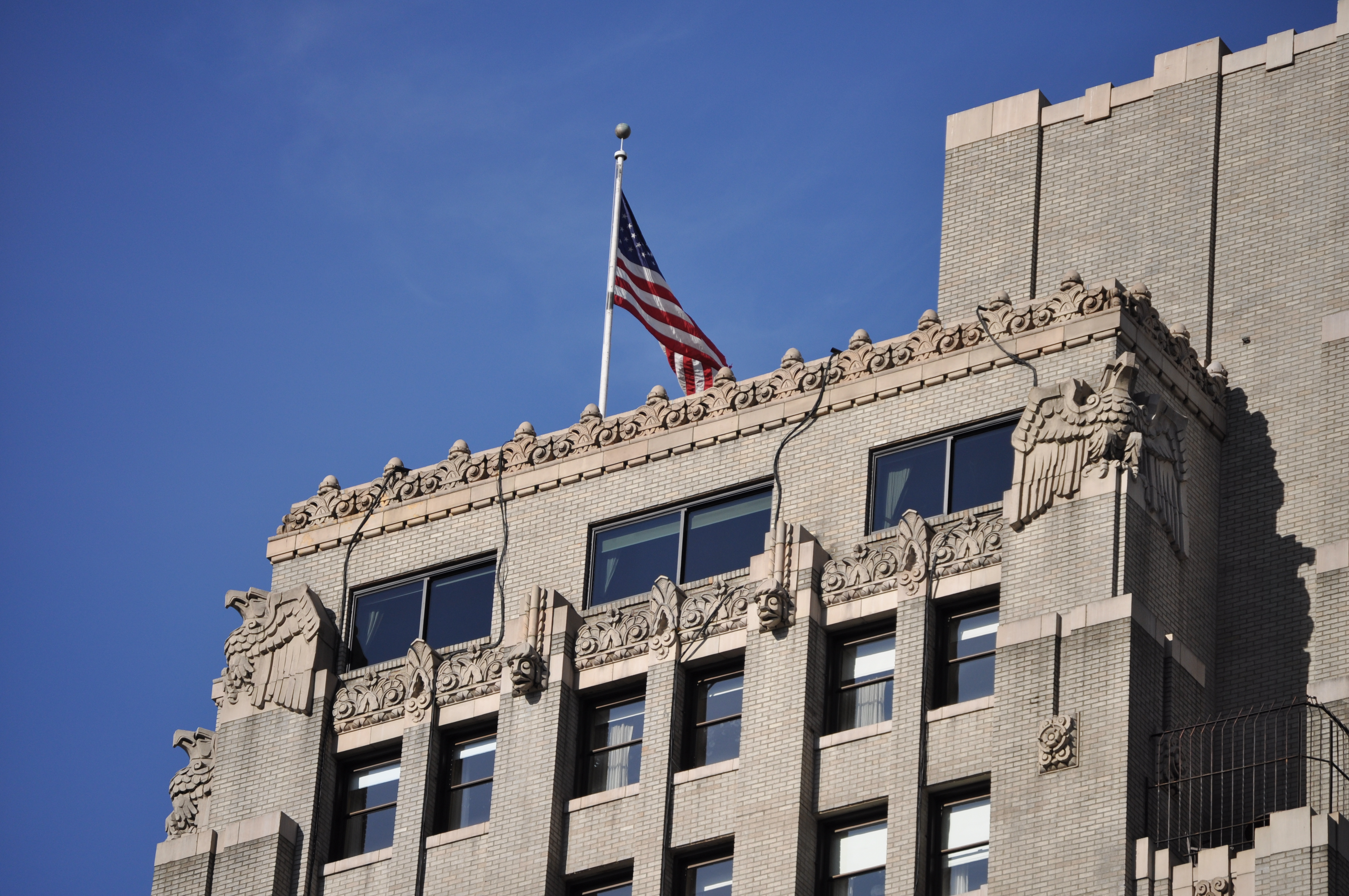
more roof-line details

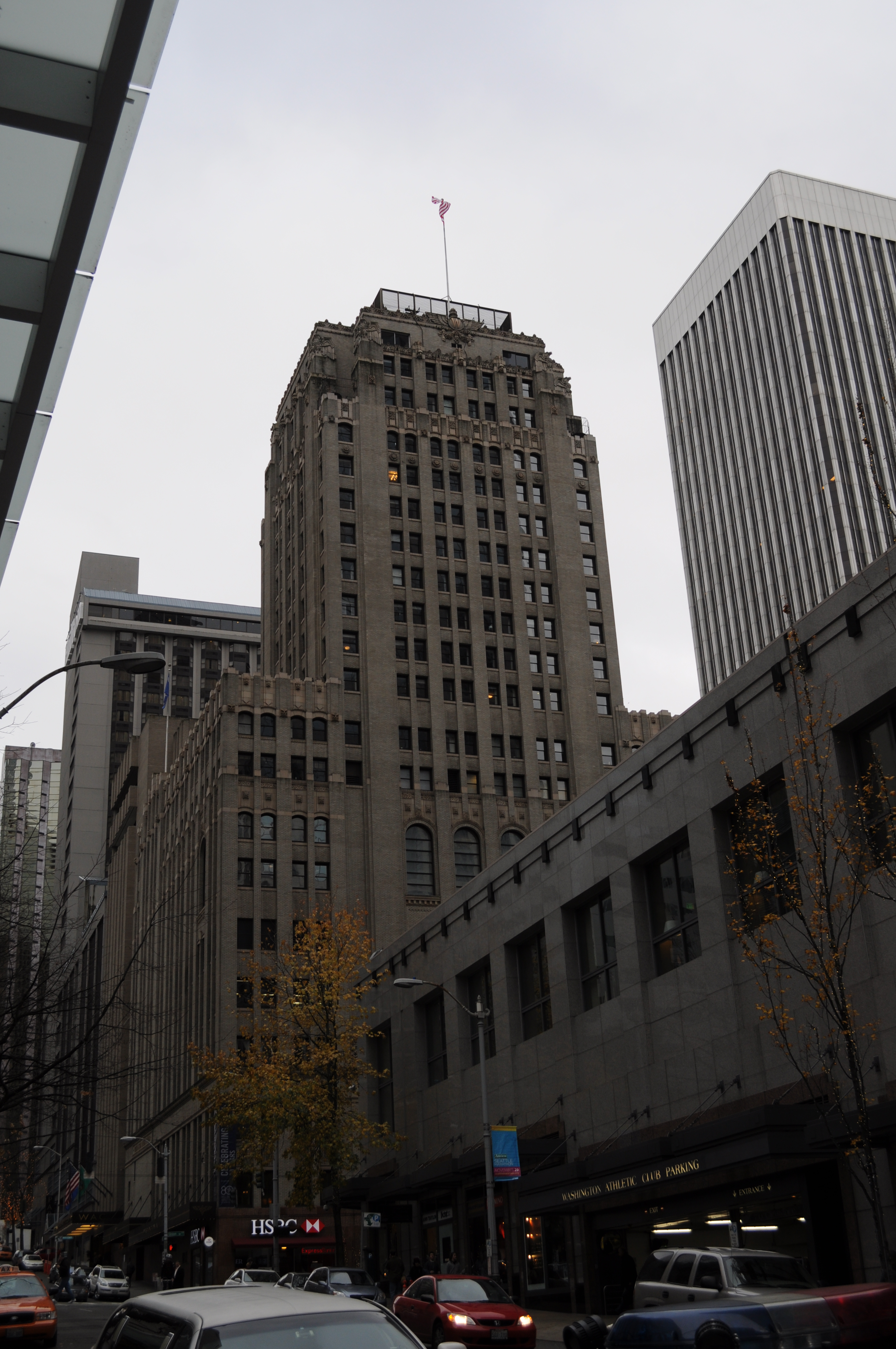
Looking south down 6th Avenue towards the building

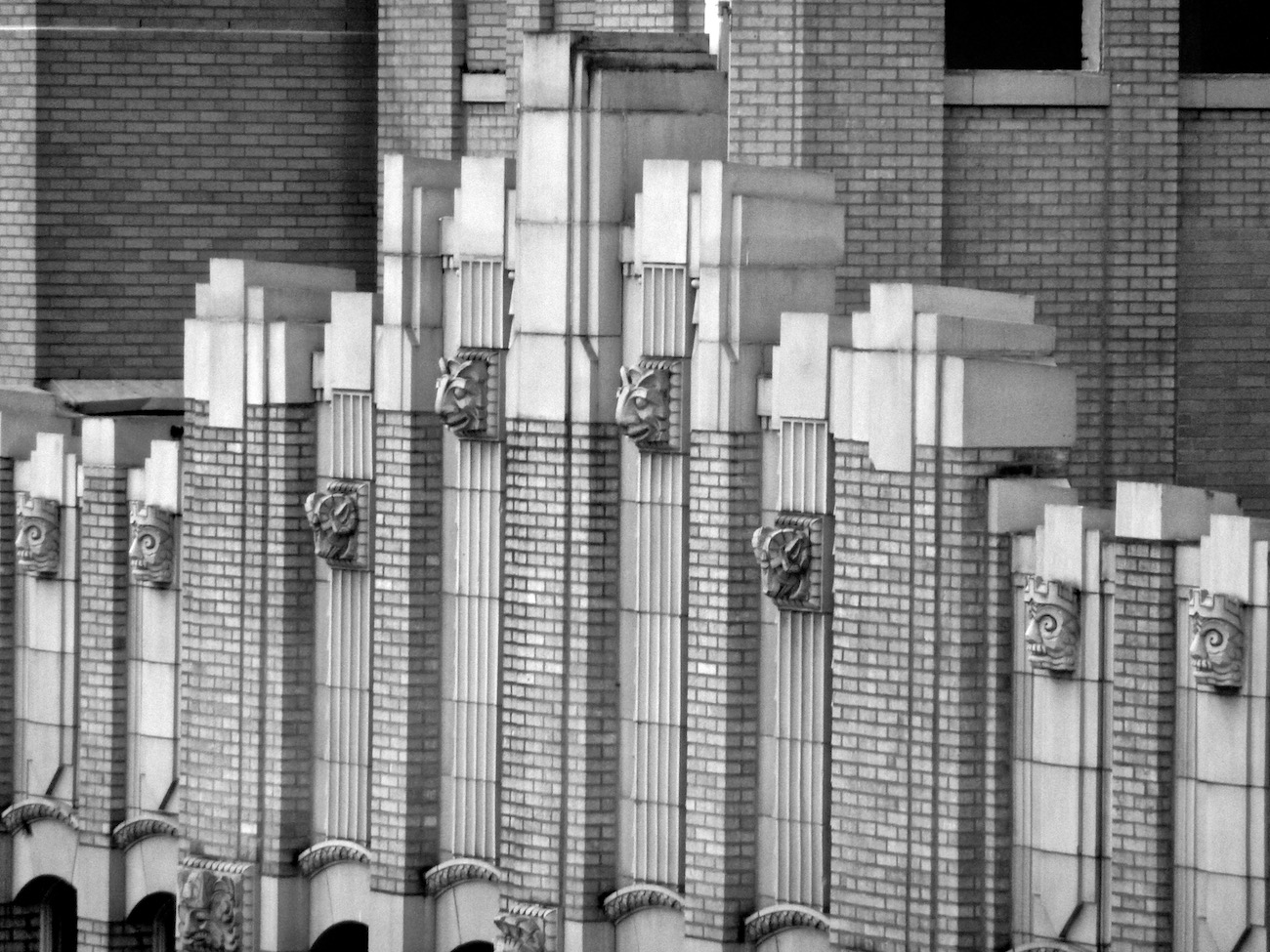
Section of Washington Athletic Club Building
