= Dermot O'Brien (Australian footballer) =

Australian rules footballer

Personal information
- Full name: Dermot Patrick John O'Brien
- Born: 28 April 1906; Mitiamo, Victoria
- Died: 7 February 1988 (aged 81); Sydney
- Original team: Old Xaverians

Playing career^{1}
Years	Club	Games (Goals)
1926–1927	St Kilda	15 (0)
1928	Hawthorn	5 (0)
Total		20 (0)
- ^{1} Playing statistics correct to the end of 1928.

Dermot Patrick John O'Brien (28 April 1906 – 7 February 1988) was an Australian rules footballer who played with St Kilda and Hawthorn in the Victorian Football League (VFL).
