= Stanisław Pastecki =

Polish ice hockey player

- Born: 12 November 1907; Warsaw, Poland
- Died: 24 February 1988 (aged 80); Alhambra, California, U.S.
- Position: Left wing
- Polish 1. Liga team: WTL Warszawa; Legia Warsaw

Stanisław Zygmunt Pastecki (12 November 1907 – 24 February 1988) was a Polish ice hockey winger. He was a reserve member of the Polish ice hockey team during the 1928 Winter Olympics.
