= Aldo Federici =

Italian ice hockey player

Personal information
- Nationality: Italian
- Born: 6 September 1920; Davos, Switzerland
- Died: 7 February 1988 (aged 67); Milan, Italy

Sport
- Sport: Ice hockey

Aldo Federici (6 September 1920 – 7 February 1988) was an Italian ice hockey player. He competed in the men's tournament at the 1948 Winter Olympics and the 1956 Winter Olympics.
