= Phrateres =

International women's social and philanthropic society

- Φ
- Founded: December 10, 1924; 101 years ago University of California, Los Angeles
- Type: Social
- Affiliation: Independent
- Status: Active
- Scope: Local (formerly North America)
- Motto: "Famous for Friendliness"
- Pillars: Sisterhood, Sports, Social, and Service
- Colors: Blue and Gold
- Flower: Yellow tea rose
- Publication: The Thetan; The Phraterean (former)
- Chapters: 1 active 26 inactive
- Nicknames: Phis, Phratereans
- Headquarters: University of British Columbia; Vancouver, British Columbia; Canada
- Website: www.phrateres.com

Phrateres (/frɑːˈtɛəriːz/ frah-TAIR-eez) is a North American philanthropic-social organization for female college students. Although founded at the University of California, Los Angeles in 1924, it currently only has one chapter, located at the University of British Columbia.

== History ==
Phrateres was founded at the University of California, Los Angeles in 1924 by the dean of women, Helen Matthewson Laughlin. The intention was to bring "independent" women students (i.e. those not in dormitories or sororities) into a collective group for socialization and philanthropy. However, the new group proved popular, and soon membership was extended to any female student who wished to join, including those who lived in dorms, commuted to campus, as well as members of sororities. Laughlin was the organization's grand president, serving in that capacity until 1957.

Word spread to other colleges, especially those on the West Coast. The Beta chapter was installed at the University of Washington in 1929. Ten more chapters were installed in the 1930s: Gamma and Delta in 1930, Epsilon In 1931, Zeta in 1932, Eta In 1933, Theta and Iota in 1935, Kappa in 1936, Lambda in 1937, and Nu in 1939.

Eventually, Phrateres had sixteen chapters in seven states and one province in Canada. However, from 1945 until the late 1950s, three of those chapters closed: Delta, Eta, and Omicron.

From the 1930s to the 1990s, conventions were held every one to two years, with members of the host chapter housing delegates from other chapters. Chapters could win awards, such as Most Active Chapter and Best Scrapbook.

Other chapters were established, bringing the number of chartered chapters to 27. In the 1990s, only three active collegiate chapters remained: Theta, Lambda, and Eta 2. Eta closed during that decade and Lambda closed in 2000. Then, the only active collegiate chapter remaining was Theta at the University of British Columbia (UBC).

The Phrateres International Board disbanded in 2001 after turning over its assets to the Theta chapter. As of 2024, the Theta chapter still exists at UBC in the form of a non-exclusive social and service club for women.

== Symbols ==
The organization's motto is "Famous for Friendliness". Its colors are blue and gold. Its flower was the yellow tea rose. Its nicknames are Phis and Phratereans.

Phraters' 4 S's or pillars are Sisterhood, Sports, Social, and Service.

== Activities ==
The Theta chapter participates in social events and intramural sports. The Theta chapter organizes and participates in various philanthropic events. Annual events include the Terry Fox Run to raise money for cancer research and the Trick or Eat canned food drive.

The Lura Heeter Award was a scholarship given to one collegiate member yearly by the national fraternity, starting in 1985 by the Zeta chapter. When the board disbanded in 2001, monies from the Lura Heeter Award were given to the Zeta Alumnae Chapter.

== Membership ==
All women students are encouraged and welcomed to join the organization.

== Governance ==
Phrateres International consisted of a board of trustees. A grand president led the board. It collected fees from each chapter, presented an annual scholarship, and published The Phraterean newsletter. When the national board disbanded the organization in 2001, it gave its remaining funds to the Theta chapter.

== Chapters ==
Records for 26 collegiate chapters have been found, with 23 in the United States and nine in Canada.

=== Theta chapter ===
Theta at the University of British Columbia (UBC) is the only active chapter. In the mid-1930s, Clare Brown (President of the Women's Undergraduate Society) petitioned the Dean of Women, Mary Bollert, to bring Phrates to UBC. Theta chapter was installed on February 1, 1935. It was the eighth chapter installed, but the first Canadian chapter.

From installation until the 1970s, membership was large enough to support as many as twelve sub-chapters. Each sub-chapter had its own president and council, with all sub-chapters falling under the control of an executive council comprising the Rho sub-chapter. Each sub-chapter also had a faculty advisor and recruited members separately. This promoted friendly competition between the sub-chapters.

In those earlier decades, students at UBC had to wait until their sophomore year to join fraternities and sororities. Freshman female students were required to join Phrateres if they wanted to join a sorority later. After that first year, members either decided to stay solely in Phrateres, leave Phrateres for a sorority, or maintain membership in both. When the policy changed, and freshmen were allowed to rush, the Theta chapter experienced a dramatic decline in membership (since the 1980s, membership has not exceeded 100). From that point onwards, Phrateres at UBC was no longer seen as an organization to unify all women students, as had been the vision of Dean Laughlin at UCLA in 1924. Sub-chapters eventually ceased and the club presently operates as one unified chapter.

=== Alumnae chapters ===
Theta Alumnae and Zeta Alumnae chapters are still active.

== Notable members ==
- Irma Schoennauer Cole (Beta), swimmer
- Joy Coghill (Theta), actress, director, artistic director, theatre producer, teacher, playwright, and PAL founder.
