= Inger Carlsen =

Danish swimmer

Personal information
- Born: 7 June 1918 Copenhagen, Denmark
- Died: 5 February 1988 (aged 69) Gentofte, Denmark

Sport
- Sport: Swimming

Inger Carlsen (7 June 1918 – 5 February 1988) was a Danish swimmer. She competed in the women's 400 metre freestyle at the 1936 Summer Olympics.
