= Irma Schrameková =

Czech swimmer

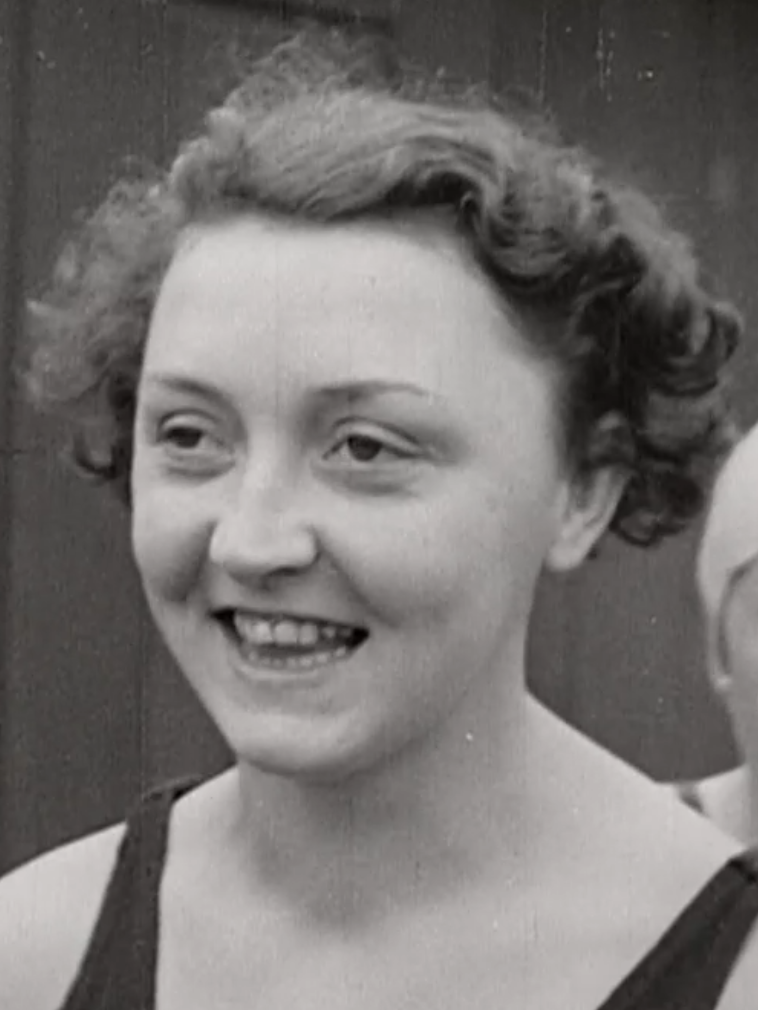
- the Across Prague races, 1935

Personal information
- Born: 20 February 1912

Sport
- Sport: Swimming

Irma Schrameková (born 20 February 1912, date of death unknown) was a Czech swimmer. She competed in two events at the 1936 Summer Olympics.
