= Noel Horsfield =

South African sailor

Personal information
- Nationality: South African
- Born: 22 December 1913
- Died: 13 February 1988 (aged 74)

Sport
- Sport: Sailing

Noel Horsfield (22 December 1913 – 13 February 1988) was a South African sailor. He competed at the 1952 Summer Olympics and the 1956 Summer Olympics.
