= Grete Frederiksen =

Danish swimmer

Personal information
- Born: January 12, 1918 Copenhagen, Denmark
- Died: September 5, 2007 (aged 89)

Sport
- Sport: Swimming

Grete Ortved Frederiksen (later Therkildsen, January 12, 1918 – September 5, 2007) was a Danish freestyle swimmer who competed in the 1936 Summer Olympics. She was born in Copenhagen. In 1936 she finished seventh in the 400 metre freestyle event.

== See also ==
- World record progression 1500 metres freestyle
