= Helene Madison =

American swimmer (1913–1970)

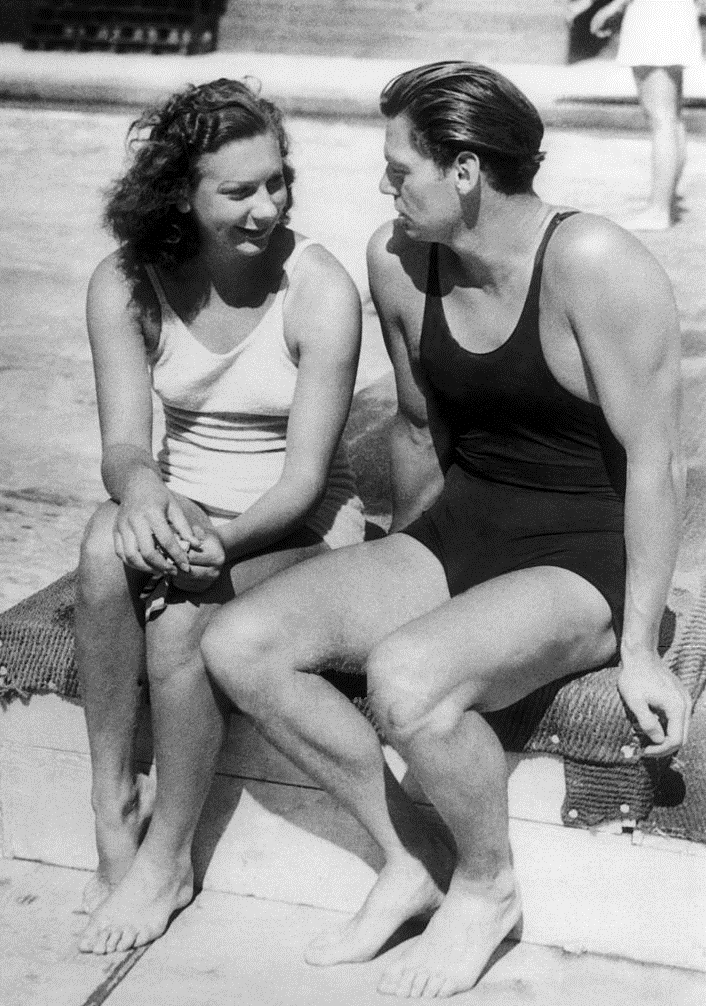
- Madison (left) with Johnny Weissmuller at 1932 Olympics

Personal information
- Full name: Helene Emma Madison
- National team: United States
- Born: June 19, 1913 Madison, Wisconsin, U.S.
- Died: November 27, 1970 (aged 57) Seattle, Washington, U.S.
- Height: 5 ft 10 in (1.78 m)
- Weight: 154 lb (70 kg)

Sport
- Sport: Swimming
- Strokes: Freestyle
- Club: Washington Athletic Club (WAC)
- Coach: Ray Daughters (WAC)
Medal record
Women's swimming
Representing the United States
Women's swimming
Gold medal – first place	1932 Los Angeles	100 m freestyle
Gold medal – first place	1932 Los Angeles	400 m freestyle
Gold medal – first place	1932 Los Angeles	4×100 m freestyle

Helene Emma Madison (June 19, 1913 – November 27, 1970) was an American swimmer. She was a 1932 Olympic gold medalist in the 100-meter, 400-meter and 4x100-meter freestyle relay, and a former world record-holder.

== Early life ==
Madison was born on June 9, 1913, in Madison, Wisconsin, though, as a child, her family relocated to Seattle. By age 12, she began swimming in Green Lake, one block from her home, and later participated in Seattle Parks Department swim programs. Recognized as a young talent by local Seattle area coach Ray Daughters in 1928, Madison started swimming competitively with Daughters at the Crystal Pool, and later at the Washington Athletic Club. She soon won the 1928 Northwest High School Championship in one of her first major victories as a competitive swimmer. Daughters would also later serve as the Head Coach for Madison's 1932 U.S. Women's Olympic swim team.

== Freestyle records ==
Madison's swimming achievements in freestyle swimming were unheralded and remain unique among women's freestyle competitors through the 1932 Olympics. In a sixteen-month period in 1930 and 1931, she broke sixteen world records in various distances. She held all the official world records in freestyle in 1932 from 50-yards to the mile, and held American national records in the 100m, 220yd, 500yd, and 800yd freestyles. Her American National Championship records held for many years, with the distance events lasting the longest. Her record in the 100-meter freestyle lasted 15 years, her 220-yard freestyle record lasted 6 years, her 500-yard freestyle record lasted 23 years and her 880-yard freestyle lasted 5 years. In sprint events, she was most easily remembered for swimming a 100-yard freestyle in one minute flat.

== 1932 Olympics ==
Madison won three gold medals in freestyle events at the 1932 Summer Olympics in Los Angeles, becoming, along with Romeo Neri of Italy, the most successful athlete at the 1932 Olympics: women's 100-meter freestyle, 400-meter freestyle, and 4×100-meter freestyle relay.

In the 100-meter freestyle final, she swam a time of 1:06.8, and though she did poorly in a semi-final, she finished strong in the final and managed to edge out silver medalist Willy den Ouden of the Netherlands by 1 second.

In the 4x100 meter freestyle relay, Madison anchored the American team which was considerably faster than the competition and consisted of Josephine McKim, Helen Johns and Eleanor Garatti. As only five countries competed, there was no need for preliminary heats. The American team finished in a World Record time of 4:38, defeating the second place team from the Netherlands that finished 9 seconds later with a time of 4:47.5.

In the 400-meter freestyle, Madison was the standing world record holder, but the race was closer than expected. Madison swam a 5:28.5, though she had to edge out American silver medalist Lenore Kight, who finished only one-tenth of a second behind her. With the Americans dominant, South African Jenny Maakal, finished a full nineteen seconds behind second place American, Lenore Kight. The race was Madison's last of the Olympics, and the last of her swimming career.

=== Post-swimming careers ===
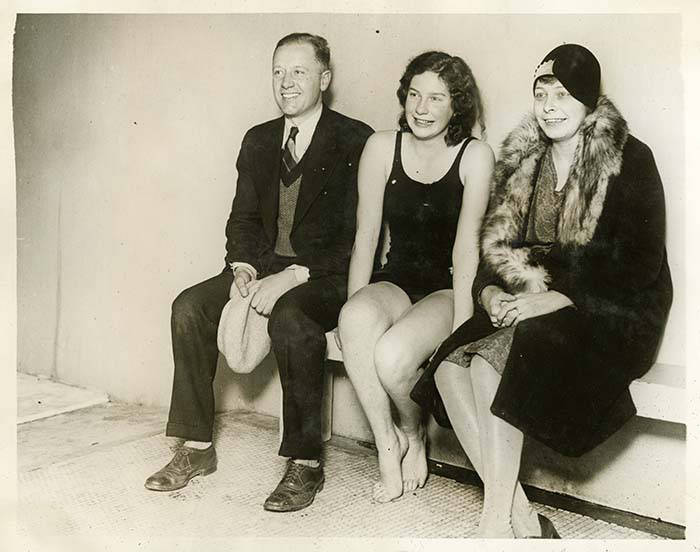
Coach Ray Daughters (left) and Madison (center) at Moore Hotel Pool, circa 1929

Following the August, 1932 Los Angeles Olympics, Madison was met in Seattle with a ticker-tape parade and a large reception. Only two weeks later, she swam in a paid exhibition and lost her amateur standing.

She appeared in The Human Fish, in 1932, a short film directed by Clyde Bruckman that included a small part for Johnny Weissmuller, where she had a starring role as the Human Fish. In the same year, she appeared in an uncredited role in The Warrior's Husband. Neither of the films she appeared in were large box office draws, and her attempt to work as a nightclub entertainer was short-lived. Having worked as a professional actor, she was not allowed to participate in the 1936 Summer Olympics in Berlin.

In July 1934, she coached swimming briefly at Seattle's Alki Natatorium at Alki Beach.

From 1948 to 1951, she coached Seattle's Moore Hotel Swimming Team, where she led her women's squad to first place in the Chronicle Championship in August 16-17, 1951. In May, 1950, she was hospitalized after an operation to treat a severe back injury, though continued to coach after recovering.

She also worked as a food vendor at a Seattle beach where as a woman she was not allowed to become a lifeguard, a department store clerk and a student nurse.

== Personal life ==
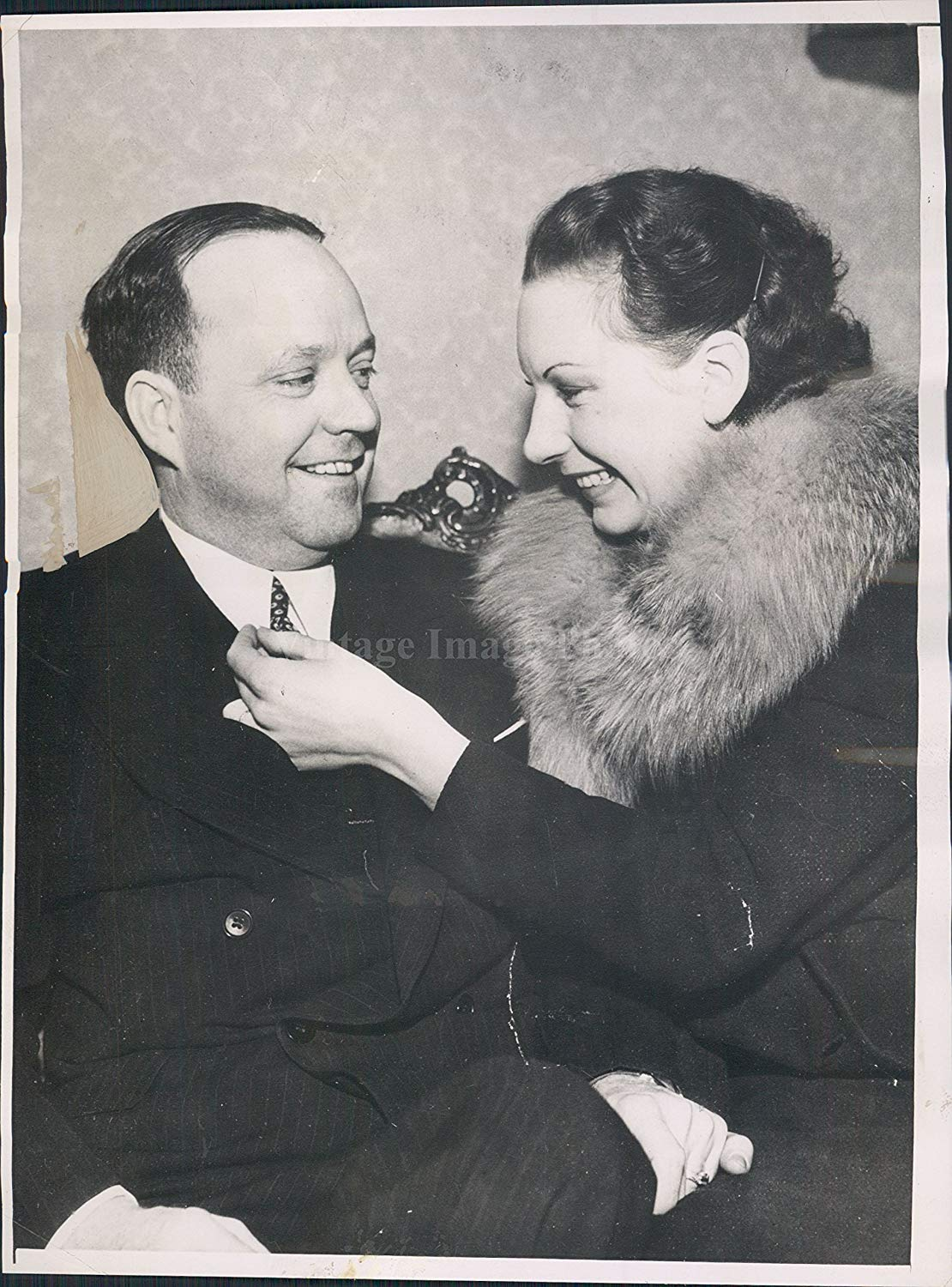
Madison and McIver in 1937

On March 6, 1937, while working as a student nurse in Seattle, she married Luther C. McCiver, an engineer and builder, whom she had met in 1931 at the height of her swimming career. Madison had one child around 1938, Helene Madison Ware, who at one time lived in Marysville, Washington. Divorced three times and living alone, she died of throat cancer in 1970 in Seattle, Washington. The ashes from her cremation are held at a mausoleum in the Acacia Memorial Park in Lake Forest Park, Washington.

== Honors ==
She was inducted into the International Swimming Hall of Fame in 1966, and the U.S. Olympic Hall of Fame in 1992. She was voted the Associated Press Female Athlete of the Year for 1931. In 1960, she was elected as part of the introductory class to the Washington State Athletic Hall of Fame in Tacoma.

The Helene Madison Pool, built in 1970 in the Bitter Lake neighborhood of North Seattle, is dedicated to her memory.

== See also ==
- List of members of the International Swimming Hall of Fame
- List of multiple Olympic gold medalists
- List of Olympic medalists in swimming (women)
- World record progression 100 metres freestyle
- World record progression 200 metres freestyle
- World record progression 400 metres freestyle
- World record progression 800 metres freestyle
- World record progression 1500 metres freestyle
- World record progression 4 × 100 metres freestyle relay

Records
Preceded by Albina Osipowich	Women's 100-meter freestyle world record-holder (long course); 14 March 1930 – 9 July 1933	Succeeded by Willy den Ouden
Preceded by Martha Norelius	Women's 200 metre freestyle world record holder (long course); 6 March 1930 – 3 May 1933	Succeeded by Willy den Ouden
Preceded by Martha Norelius	Women's 400 metre freestyle world record holder (long course); 13 February 1931 – 12 July 1934	Succeeded by Willy den Ouden
Preceded by Josephine McKim	Women's 800-meter freestyle world record-holder (long course); 6 July 1930 – 23 July 1931	Succeeded by Yvonne Godard
Preceded by Martha Norelius	Women's 1,500-meter freestyle world record-holder (long course); 15 July 1931 – 26 June 1936	Succeeded by Grete Frederiksen
