= Japan at the 1936 Summer Olympics =

- IOC code: JPN
- NOC: Japanese Olympic Committee

in Berlin
- Competitors: 179 in 13 sports
- Flag bearer: Kenkichi Oshima
- Medals Ranked 8th: Gold 6 Silver 4 Bronze 8 Total 18

Summer Olympics appearances (overview)
- 1912; 1920; 1924; 1928; 1932; 1936; 1948; 1952; 1956; 1960; 1964; 1968; 1972; 1976; 1980; 1984; 1988; 1992; 1996; 2000; 2004; 2008; 2012; 2016; 2020; 2024; 2028

The Empire of Japan competed at the 1936 Summer Olympics in Berlin, Germany. 179 athletes competed in 13 sports and also participated in art competitions. In art competitions, Japan won 2 bronze medals by Ryuji Fujita in paintings and also Sujaku Suzuki in drawing and water colours.

== Medalists ==
Medal	Name	Sport	Event	Date
Gold	Naoto Tajima	Athletics	Men's triple jump	August 6
Gold	Kitei Son	Athletics	Men's marathon	August 9
Gold	Hideko Maehata	Swimming	Women's 200 m breaststroke	August 11
Gold	Shigeo Arai; Shigeo Sugiura; Masaharu Taguchi; Masanori Yusa	Swimming	Men's 4 × 200 m freestyle relay	August 11
Gold	Tetsuo Hamuro	Swimming	Men's 200 m breaststroke	August 15
Gold	Noboru Terada	Swimming	Men's 1500 m freestyle	August 15
Silver	Shuhei Nishida	Athletics	Men's pole vault	August 5
Silver	Masao Harada	Athletics	Men's triple jump	August 6
Silver	Masanori Yusa	Swimming	Men's 100 m freestyle	August 9
Silver	Shumpei Uto	Swimming	Men's 400 m freestyle	August 12
Bronze	Naoto Tajima	Athletics	Men's long jump	August 4
Bronze	Sueo Ōe	Athletics	Men's pole vault	August 5
Bronze	Shōryū Nan	Athletics	Men's marathon	August 9
Bronze	Shigeo Arai	Swimming	Men's 100 m freestyle	August 9
Bronze	Shozo Makino	Swimming	Men's 400 m freestyle	August 12
Bronze	Masaji Kiyokawa	Swimming	Men's 100 m backstroke	August 14
Bronze	Reizo Koike	Swimming	Men's 200 m breaststroke	August 15
Bronze	Shumpei Uto	Swimming	Men's 1500 m freestyle	August 15

Medals by sport
Sport	1st place, gold medalist(s)	2nd place, silver medalist(s)	3rd place, bronze medalist(s)	Total
Swimming	4	2	5	11
Athletics	2	2	3	7
Total	6	4	8	18

== Aquatics ==
=== Swimming ===
Men

Ranks given are within the heat.

Athlete	Event	Heat		Semifinal		Final	
Athlete	Event	Time	Rank	Time	Rank	Time	Rank
Shigeo Arai	100 m freestyle	57.7	1 Q	57.9	2 Q	58.0	3rd place, bronze medalist(s)
Masaharu Taguchi	100 m freestyle	57.5 OR	1 Q	57.9	1 Q	58.1	4
Masanori Yusa	100 m freestyle	57.8	1 Q	57.5 =OR	1 Q	57.9	2nd place, silver medalist(s)
Shozo Makino	400 m freestyle	4:51.3	1 Q	4:48.2	=1 Q	4:48.1	3rd place, bronze medalist(s)
Hiroshi Negami	400 m freestyle	4:52.6	1 Q	4:55.4	3 Q	4:53.6	5
Shunpei Uto	400 m freestyle	4:45.5 OR	1 Q	4:48.4	1 Q	4:45.6	2nd place, silver medalist(s)
Sunao Ishiharada	1500 m freestyle	19:55.8	1 Q	19.53.9	2 Q	19:48.5	4
Noboru Terada	1500 m freestyle	19:55.5	=1 Q	19:48.6	1 Q	19:13.7	1st place, gold medalist(s)
Shunpei Uto	1500 m freestyle	19:48.3	1 Q	19:55.6	3 Q	19:34.5	3rd place, bronze medalist(s)
Masaji Kiyokawa	100 m backstroke	1:07.2	2 Q	1:09.7	2 Q	1:08.4	3rd place, bronze medalist(s)
Yasuhiko Kojima	100 m backstroke	1:09.7	1 Q	1:09.9	3 Q	1:10.4	6
Kiichi Yoshida	100 m backstroke	1:10.0	1 Q	1:09.5	4 q	1:09.7	5
Tetsuo Hamuro	200 m breaststroke	2:42.5 OR	1 Q	2:43.4	1 Q	2:41.5	1st place, gold medalist(s)
Saburo Ito	200 m breaststroke	2:45.8	1 Q	2:45.5	3 Q	2:47.6	5
Reizo Koike	200 m breaststroke	2:43.8	1 Q	2:44.5	1 Q	2:44.2	3rd place, bronze medalist(s)
Masanori Yusa; Shigeo Sugiura; Masaharu Taguchi; Shigeo Arai	4 × 200 m freestyle relay	—N/a		8:56.1	1 Q	8:51.5 WR	1st place, gold medalist(s)

Women

Ranks given are within the heat.

Athlete	Event	Heat		Semifinal		Final	
Athlete	Event	Time	Rank	Time	Rank	Time	Rank
Tsuneko Furuta	100 m freestyle	1:14.6	6	Did not advance			
Kazue Kojima	100 m freestyle	1:11.0	2 Q	1:11.1	7 Q	Did not advance	
Rei Takemura	100 m freestyle	1:14.6	7	Did not advance			
Kazue Kojima	400 m freestyle	5:50.4	3 Q	5:43.5	3 Q	5:43.1	6
Hatsuko Morioka	400 m freestyle	5:51.0	4 q	5:49.1	6	Did not advance	
Hideko Maehata	200 m breaststroke	3:01.9 OR	1 Q	3:03.1	1 Q	3:03.6	1st place, gold medalist(s)
Unoko Tsuboi	200 m breaststroke	3:15.0	3 Q	3:18.4	6	Did not advance	
Tsuneko Furuta; Kazue Kojima; Hatsuko Morioka; Rei Takemura	4 × 100 m freestyle relay	—N/a		4:58.1 NR	4	Did not advance	

=== Diving ===
Men

Athlete	Event	Final	
Athlete	Event	Points	Rank
Tomio Koyanagi	3 m springboard	133.07	8
Tsuneo Shibahara	3 m springboard	144.92	4
Tomio Koyanagi	10 m platform	94.54	8
Tsuneo Shibahara	10 m platform	107.40	6

Women

Athlete	Event	Final	
Athlete	Event	Points	Rank
Fusako Kōno	3 m springboard	70.27	8
Masayo Ōsawa	3 m springboard	73.94	6
Fusako Kōno	10 m platform	30.24	6
Masayo Ōsawa	10 m platform	28.10	14
Reiko Ōsawa	10 m platform	32.53	4

=== Water polo ===
==== Elimination rounds ====
In the first round each team in a group played each other team in the same group. The placings were determined on points. If the points were equal, then the better goal average decided. The first two teams of each group were qualified for the semi-finals, while the third and fourth placed team was eliminated.

Group 3

Rank	Team	Pld	W	D	L	GF	GA	Pts	(Germany)	(France)	(Czechoslovakia)	(Japan)
1.	Germany	3	3	0	0	27	3	6	X	8:1	6:1	13:1
2.	France	3	2	0	1	12	10	4	1:8	X	3:2	8:0
3.	Czechoslovakia	3	1	0	2	7	12	2	1:6	2:3	X	4:3
4.	Japan	3	0	0	3	4	25	0	1:13	0:8	3:4	X

Place:14th

== Basketball ==
First Round

7 August 1936	Japan	35–19	Taiwan	Berlin, Germany
6:00 PM	Scoring by half: 15–10, 20–9

Second Round

9 August 1936
4:00PM

Japan	43–31	Poland
Scoring by half: 23–13, 20–18

Berlin, Germany

Third Round

11 August 1936
4:00 PM

Mexico	28–22	Japan
Scoring by half: 12–8, 16–14

Berlin, Germany

== Football ==
Round of 16

4 August 1936
17:30

Japan	3–2	Sweden
Kamo 49'; Ukon 62'; Matsunaga 85'	Report	Persson 24', 37'

Hertha-BSC Field, Berlin
Attendance: 5,000
Referee: Wilhelm Peters (Germany)

Quarter-finals

7 August 1936
17:30

Italy	8–0	Japan
Frossi 14', 75', 80'; Biagi 32', 57', 81', 82'; Cappelli 89'	Report

Mommsenstadion, Berlin
Attendance: 8,000
Referee: Otto Olsson (Sweden)

== Field hockey ==
=== Group A ===
Pos	Team	Pld	W	D	L	GF	GA	GD	Pts	Qualification
1	India	3	3	0	0	20	0	+20	6	Semi-finals
2	Japan	3	2	0	1	8	11	−3	4	
3	Hungary	3	1	0	2	4	8	−4	2	
4	United States	3	0	0	3	2	15	−13	0	

Source: TheSports.org

5 August 1936
16:30

Japan	5–1	United States
	Report

Umpires:
J. Schenkmann (SUI)
A. Lepètre (FRA)

8 August 1936
18:00

Japan	3–1	Hungary
	Report

10 August 1936
16:30

India	9–0	Japan
	Report

== Rowing ==
Japan had 16 rowers participate in three out of seven rowing events in 1936.

Men's coxed pair

- Tsutomu Mitsudome
- Osamu Abe
- Taro Teshima (cox)

Men's coxed four

- Chikara Shirasaka
- Taichi Yamada
- Takashi Hatakeyama
- Yoichi Endo
- Taro Teshima (cox)

Men's eight

- Tadashi Negishi
- Masaru Kashiwahara
- Shusui Sekigawa
- Isamu Mita
- Osamu Kitamura
- Haruyoshi Nakagawa
- Takeo Hori
- Yoshiteru Suzuki
- Tadashi Shimijima (cox)

== Sailing ==
Japan had 3 rowers participate in 2 out of four Sailing events in 1936.

O-Jolle

- Norio Fujimura

Star

- Minoru Takarabe
- Takuo Mii
