= Kōwa Station =

Railway station in Mihama, Aichi Prefecture, Japan

Kōwa Station 河和駅

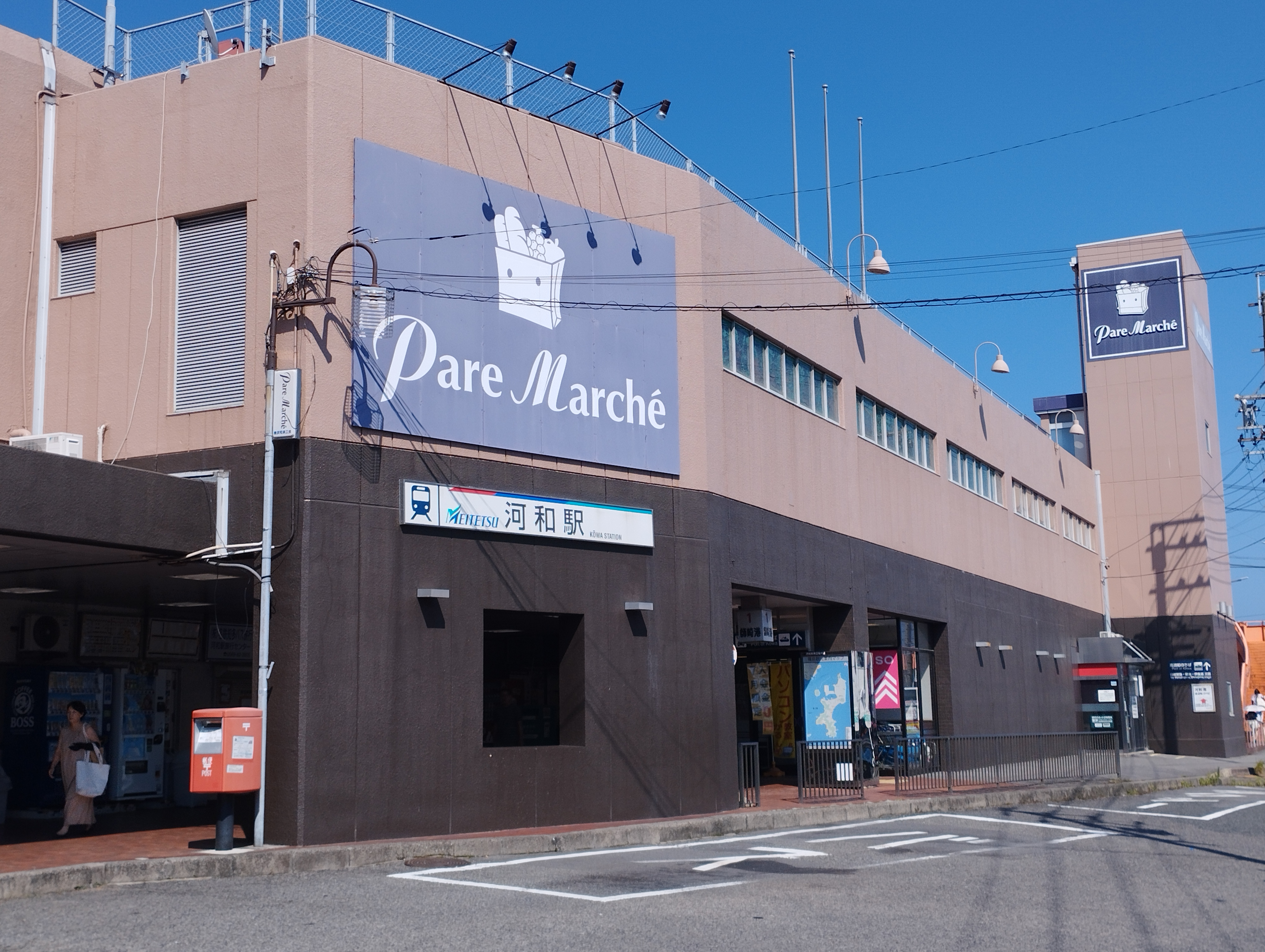
- Kōwa Station building in July 2023

General information
- Location: Kitadamen-5 Kōwa, Mihama-cho, Chita-gun, Aichi-ken 470-2406; Japan
- Coordinates: 34.7779°N 136.9124°E
- Operator: Meitetsu
- Line: ■ Meitetsu Kōwa Line
- Distance: 28.8 kilometers from Ōtagawa
- Platforms: 1 bay platform

Other information
- Status: Staffed
- Station code: KC19
- Website: Official website

History
- Opened: August 1, 1935

Passengers
- FY2018: 2171
Location
- Location within Aichi Prefecture Location within Japan

Kōwa Station (河和駅, Kōwa-eki) is a train station in the town of Mihama, Chita District, Aichi Prefecture, Japan, operated by Meitetsu.

== Lines ==
Kōwa Station is a terminus the Meitetsu Kōwa Line, and is located 28.8 kilometers from the opposing terminus of the line at Ōtagawa.

== Station layout ==
Track diagram of Kōwaguchi and Kōwa Station

Kōwa Station has a bay platform with two platforms serving four tracks. The station has automated ticket machines, Manaca automated turnstiles and is staffed.

=== Platforms ===
1	■ Meitetsu Kōwa Line	For Fuki, Ōtagawa, and Meitetsu Nagoya
2	■ Meitetsu Kōwa Line	For Fuki, Ōtagawa, and Meitetsu Nagoya
3	■ Meitetsu Kōwa Line	For Fuki, Ōtagawa, and Meitetsu Nagoya
4	■ Meitetsu Kōwa Line	For Fuki, Ōtagawa, and Meitetsu Nagoya

== Adjacent stations ==
←	Service	→
Meitetsu Kōwa Line
Kōwaguchi	Limited Express	Terminus
Kōwaguchi	Rapid Express	Terminus
Kōwaguchi	Express	Terminus
Kōwaguchi	Semi Express	Terminus
Kōwaguchi	Local	Terminus

== Station history ==
Kōwa Station was opened on August 1, 1935 as a station on the Chita Railway. The Chita Railway became part of the Meitetsu system on February 1, 1943. A new station building was completed in March 1979. In 2006, the Tranpass system of magnetic fare cards with automatic turnstiles was implemented.

== Other Transportation ==
=== Bus routes ===
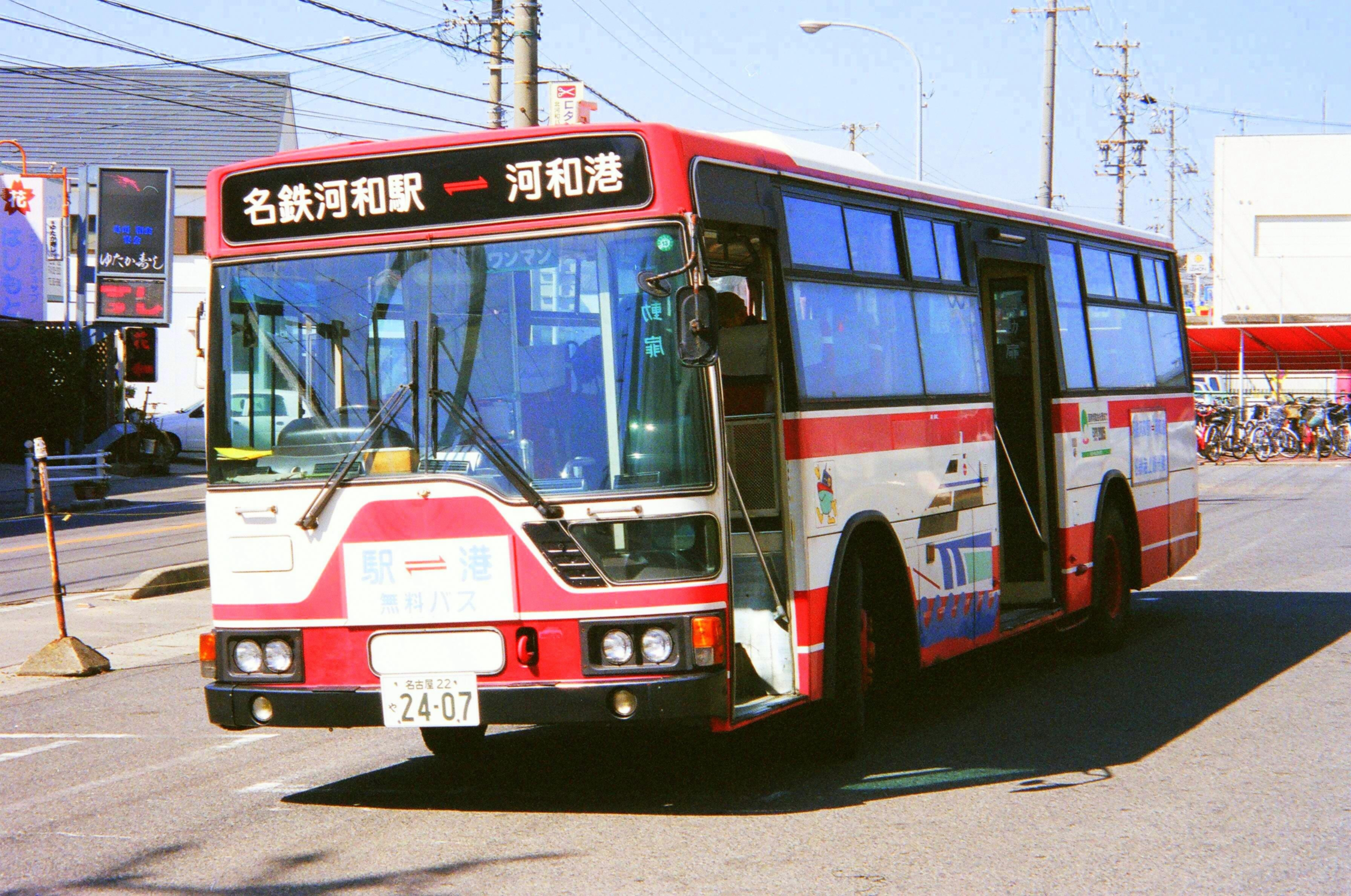
Free shuttle bus for Port of Kowa

NO	Via	Destination	Operator	Note
Morozaki Line	Yanashi - Oi	Port of Morozaki	Chita Noriai	
Minami-Chita Citial Bus "海っ子バス" Nihsi-Kaigan Line	Utsumi High school - Utsumi Station - Toyohama	Port of Morozaki	Mihama Welfare Bus	Fares for riding on this bus route at free.
Minami-Chita Citial Bus "海っ子バス" Toyohama Line	Minami Chita City Hall	Port of Morozaki	Mihama Welfare Bus	Fares for riding on this bus route at free.
Free shuttle buses	Non stop	Port of Kowa	Chita Noriai	
Mihama Circular-route Mini Bus "自然号" East Course	Kowaguchi Station - Mihama City Hall	Toshokan	Mihama Welfare Bus	Fares at free
Mihama Circular-route Mini Bus 自然号 West Course	Kami Noma Station - Chita Okuda Station - Nomazaki Lighthouse - Noma Community Hall	Toshokan	Mihama Welfare Bus	Fares at free
Free shuttle bus	Non stop	Ebi Senbei no Sato・Maruha Dining hall Country inn		Fares at free

=== Lanes ===
Ferry terminal is close to this station, and the walk takes 5 minutes, what is more, free shuttle buses operated by Chita Noriai bound for Port of Kowa depart from this station.

- Port of Kowa
  - Meitetsu Kaijō Ferry bound for Cape Irago via Himakajima・Shinojima from Port of Kowa. At Port of Irago which is located near Cape Irago the last ferry board, passengers are able to change ferries operated by Isewan Ferry. This Ferry bound for Nakanogō Station (Near Toba Aquarium).

== Passenger statistics ==
In fiscal 2018, the station was used by an average of 2171 passengers daily.

== Surrounding area ==
- Mihama Town Hall
- Japan National Route 247

== See also ==
- List of railway stations in Japan
