= Ōsawa =

Ōsawa, Osawa or Oosawa (written: 大沢 or 大澤 lit. "big swamp") is a Japanese surname. Notable people with the surname include:

- Chiho Osawa (大澤 ちほ, born 1992), Japanese ice hockey player
- Eiji Osawa (born 1935), Japanese chemist
- Itsumi Osawa (born 1966), Japanese actress, writer and singer
- Kenji Osawa (born 1976), Japanese mixed martial artist
- Kisaburo Osawa (1910–1991), Japanese aikidoka
- Masaaki Ōsawa (born 1946), Japanese politician and governor of Gunma Prefecture
- Masayo Ōsawa (1913–1945), Japanese diver
- Masayuki Osawa (大沢 正行, born 1946), Japanese swimmer
- Reiko Ōsawa (born 1915), Japanese diver
- Shigeki Osawa (born 1986), Japanese mixed martial artist
- Shinichi Osawa (born 1967), Japanese musician better known as Mondo Grosso
- Takao Osawa (born 1968), Japanese actor

== See also ==
- 19310 Osawa, an asteroid
- Ōsawa Station (disambiguation)
- Ozawa
