= Minamichita =

Minamichita 南知多町
- Town
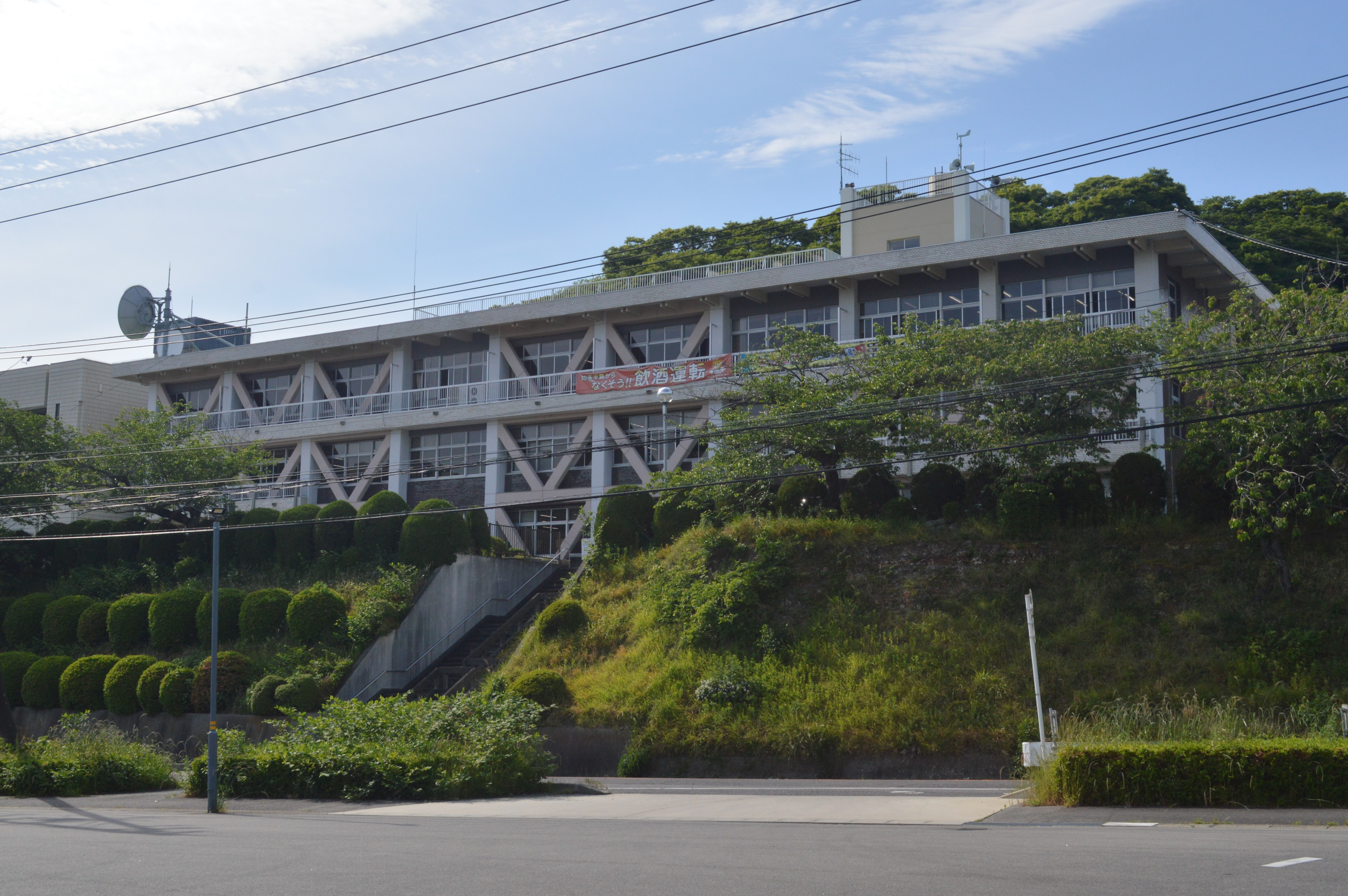
- Minamichita Town Hall

- Flag Seal

- Location of Minamichita in Aichi Prefecture

- Coordinates: 34°42′54.5″N 136°55′47.4″E
- Country: Japan
- Region: Chūbu region Tōkai region
- Prefecture: Aichi
- District: Chita

Area
  - Total: 38.37 km^{2} (14.81 sq mi)

Population (October 1, 2019)
  - Total: 17,393
  - Density: 453.3/km^{2} (1,174/sq mi)
- Time zone: UTC+9 (Japan Standard Time)
- Phone number: 0569-65-0711
- Address: Toyohama, Minamichita-chō, Chita-gun, Aichi-ken 470-3495
- Climate: Cfa
- Website: Official website
- Symbols
- Flower: Narcissus
- Tree: Quercus phillyraeoides (species of Oak)

Minamichita (南知多町, Minamichita-chō) is a town in Chita District, Aichi Prefecture, Japan. As of 1 October 2019, the town had an estimated population of 17,393 in 7338 households, and a population density of 453 persons per km^{2}. The total area of the town was 38.37 square kilometres (14.81 sq mi).

== Geography ==
Minamichita is located in the extreme southern tip of Chita Peninsula in southern Aichi Prefecture, including a number of islands in Mikawa Bay. The town is bordered by Mikawa Bay to the east, and Ise Bay to the west. Part of the town's area are within the borders of the Mikawa Wan Quasi-National Park.

=== Neighboring municipalities ===
- Aichi Prefecture
  - Mihama

=== Demographics ===
Per Japanese census data, the population of Minamichita had been declining steadily over the past 70 years.

Historical population
Year	Pop.	±%
1940	22,741	—
1950	30,379	+33.6%
1960	28,972	−4.6%
1970	27,705	−4.4%
1980	27,017	−2.5%
1990	25,954	−3.9%
2000	23,250	−10.4%
2010	20,550	−11.6%

=== Climate ===
The town has a climate characterized by hot and humid summers, and relatively mild winters (Köppen climate classification Cfa). The average annual temperature in Minamichita is 15.7 °C (60.3 °F). The average annual rainfall is 1,550.1 mm (61.03 in) with September as the wettest month. The temperatures are highest on average in August, at around 27.2 °C (81.0 °F), and lowest in January, at around 5.2 °C (41.4 °F).

Climate data for Minamichita (1991−2020 normals, extremes 1979−present)
Month	Jan	Feb	Mar	Apr	May	Jun	Jul	Aug	Sep	Oct	Nov	Dec	Year
Record high °C (°F)	17.0 (62.6)	21.0 (69.8)	24.4 (75.9)	28.9 (84.0)	32.7 (90.9)	34.8 (94.6)	38.1 (100.6)	38.3 (100.9)	36.1 (97.0)	30.4 (86.7)	25.6 (78.1)	23.1 (73.6)	38.3 (100.9)
Mean daily maximum °C (°F)	9.1 (48.4)	10.0 (50.0)	13.5 (56.3)	18.8 (65.8)	23.2 (73.8)	26.1 (79.0)	30.0 (86.0)	31.7 (89.1)	28.0 (82.4)	22.6 (72.7)	16.9 (62.4)	11.6 (52.9)	20.1 (68.2)
Daily mean °C (°F)	5.2 (41.4)	5.6 (42.1)	8.7 (47.7)	13.7 (56.7)	18.3 (64.9)	21.9 (71.4)	25.8 (78.4)	27.2 (81.0)	23.8 (74.8)	18.3 (64.9)	12.6 (54.7)	7.6 (45.7)	15.7 (60.3)
Mean daily minimum °C (°F)	1.3 (34.3)	1.4 (34.5)	4.1 (39.4)	8.9 (48.0)	13.9 (57.0)	18.5 (65.3)	22.7 (72.9)	23.8 (74.8)	20.5 (68.9)	14.6 (58.3)	8.5 (47.3)	3.6 (38.5)	11.8 (53.3)
Record low °C (°F)	−6.5 (20.3)	−7.3 (18.9)	−5.2 (22.6)	−2.7 (27.1)	2.9 (37.2)	9.0 (48.2)	14.6 (58.3)	14.1 (57.4)	8.8 (47.8)	2.7 (36.9)	−2.4 (27.7)	−6.0 (21.2)	−7.3 (18.9)
Average precipitation mm (inches)	54.4 (2.14)	59.3 (2.33)	107.7 (4.24)	122.2 (4.81)	159.9 (6.30)	187.7 (7.39)	167.7 (6.60)	106.8 (4.20)	248.7 (9.79)	201.2 (7.92)	77.4 (3.05)	57.2 (2.25)	1,550.1 (61.03)
Average precipitation days (≥ 1.0 mm)	5.4	6.1	9.2	9.5	10.1	12.3	10.9	7.3	10.5	10.0	6.6	5.9	103.8
Mean monthly sunshine hours	181.5	176.5	199.8	205.4	206.8	155.9	193.9	241.9	174.5	170.9	167.4	175.4	2,249.9
Source: Japan Meteorological Agency

== History ==
The area of Minamichita was part of Owari Province and controlled by Owari Domain under the Edo period Tokugawa shogunate. It was a major port on the coastal trade route between Edo and Osawa. After the Meiji restoration, it was organized into villages within Chita District, Aichi with the establishment of the modern municipalities system.

The modern town of Minamichita was established on June 1, 1961, through the merger of the towns of Utsumi, Mihama, and Morozaki, and the villages of Shinojima and Himakajima, all within Chita District. During March 2006, discussions were held to merge Minamichita with the town of Mihama to the north to form the new city of “Minamicentrair” after the popular nickname for Chūbu Centrair International Airport, but the merger proposal was strongly opposed by the majority of the inhabitants of Minamichita, and the merger did not take place.

== Economy ==
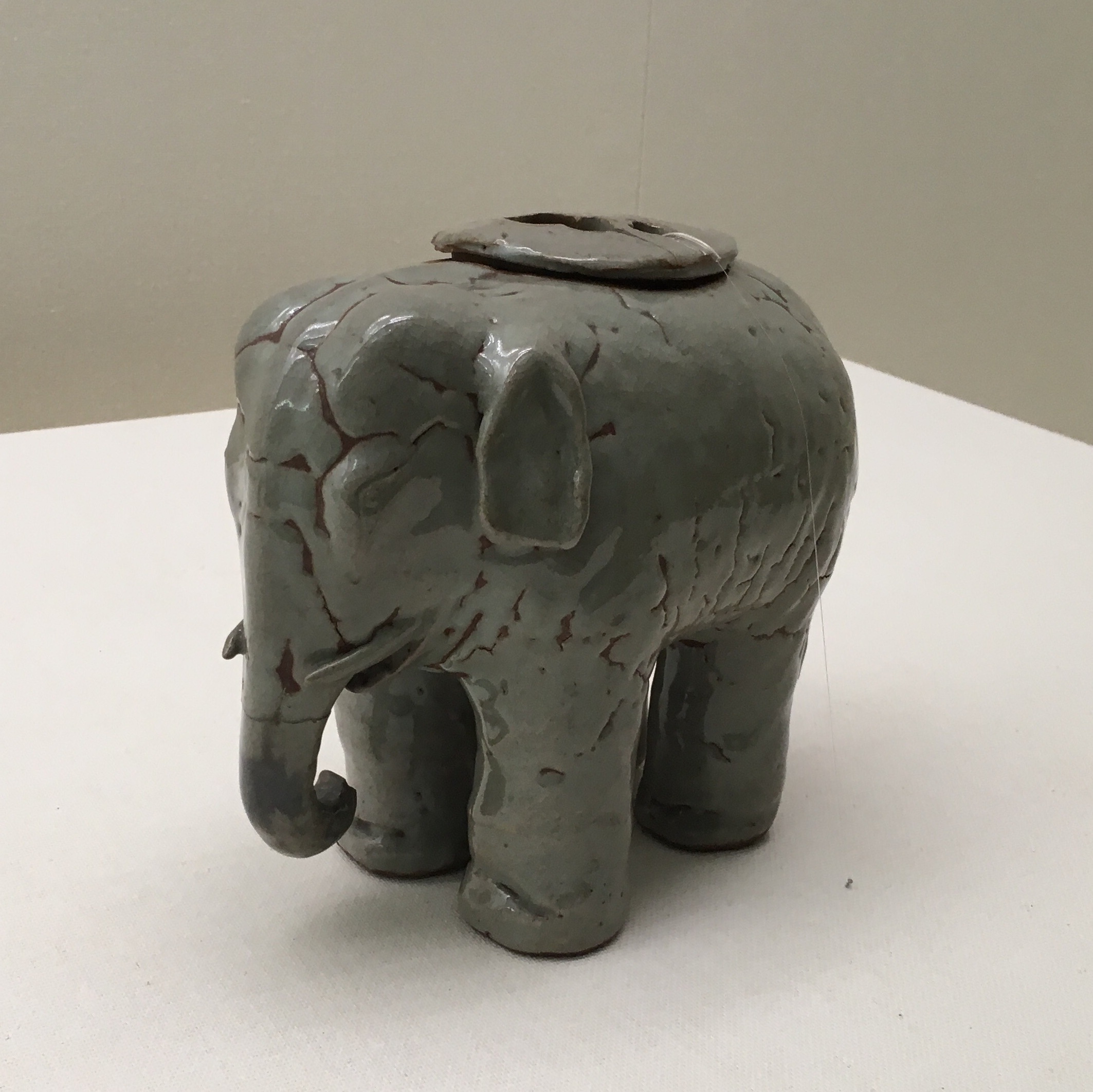
Utsumi ware ceramic censer in the shape of a standing elephant, grey glaze, Yamadera kiln (1907-1914)

The primary sector dominates the economy of Minamichita, notably commercial fishing and agriculture. Secondary industries include food processing, and seasonal tourism to beach resorts.

The Yamadera kiln (山寺窯) was located in Utsumi, today part of Minamichita. The kiln was active in the years Meiji 40 (1907) - Taishō 3 (1914). It produced Utsumi ware (内海焼).

== Education ==
Minamichita has six public elementary schools and five public junior high schools operated by the town government, and one high school operated by the Aichi Prefectural Board of Education.

== Transportation ==
=== Railway ===
Meitetsu – Chita New Line

- Utsumi

=== Highways ===
- Minamichita Road
- National Route 247

=== Seaports ===
- Morogizaki Port

== Local attractions ==
- Himakajima - island in Mikawa Bay
- Minamichita Onsen - hot spring resort
- Shinojima - island in Mikawa Bay
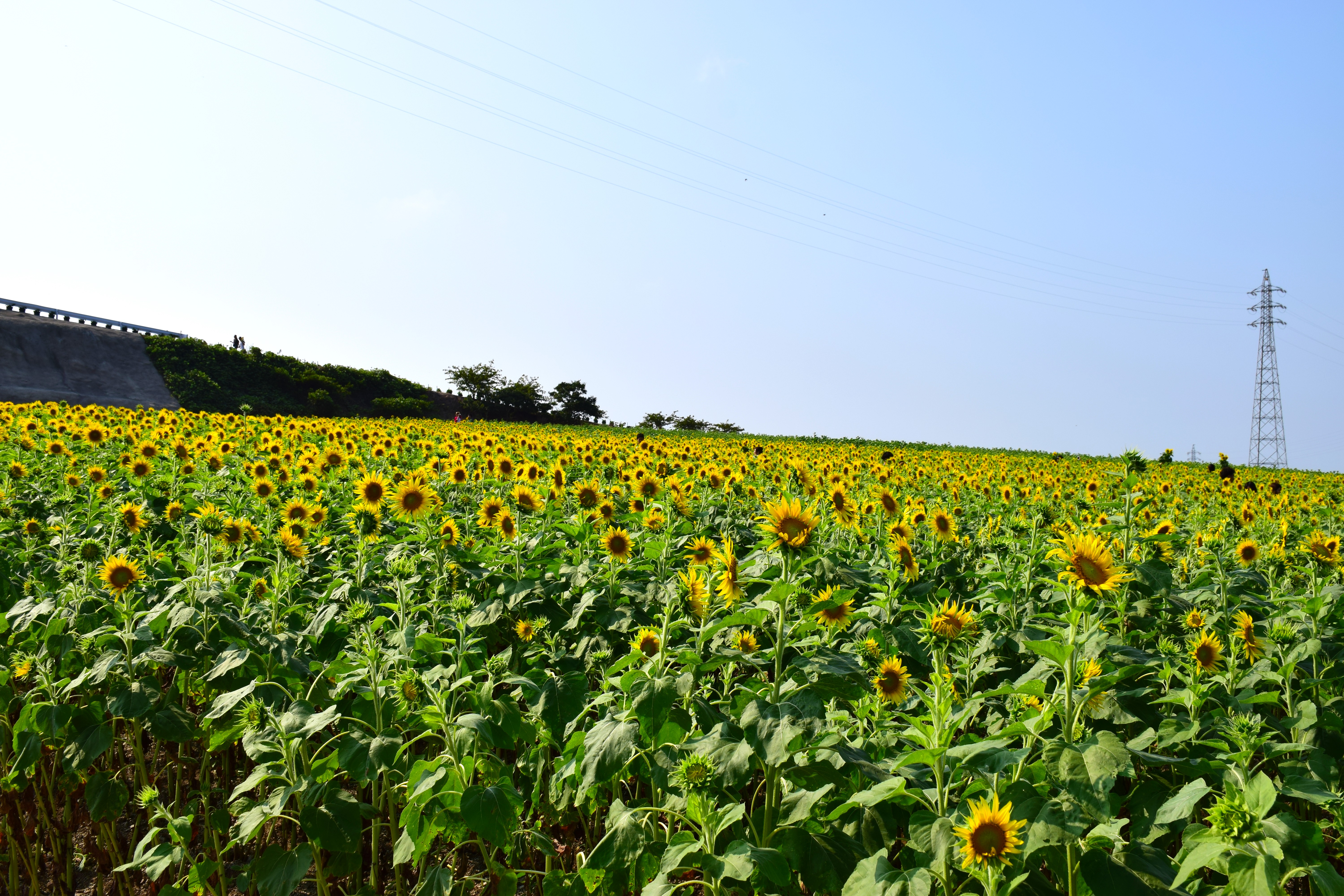
Sightseeing farm Flower garden

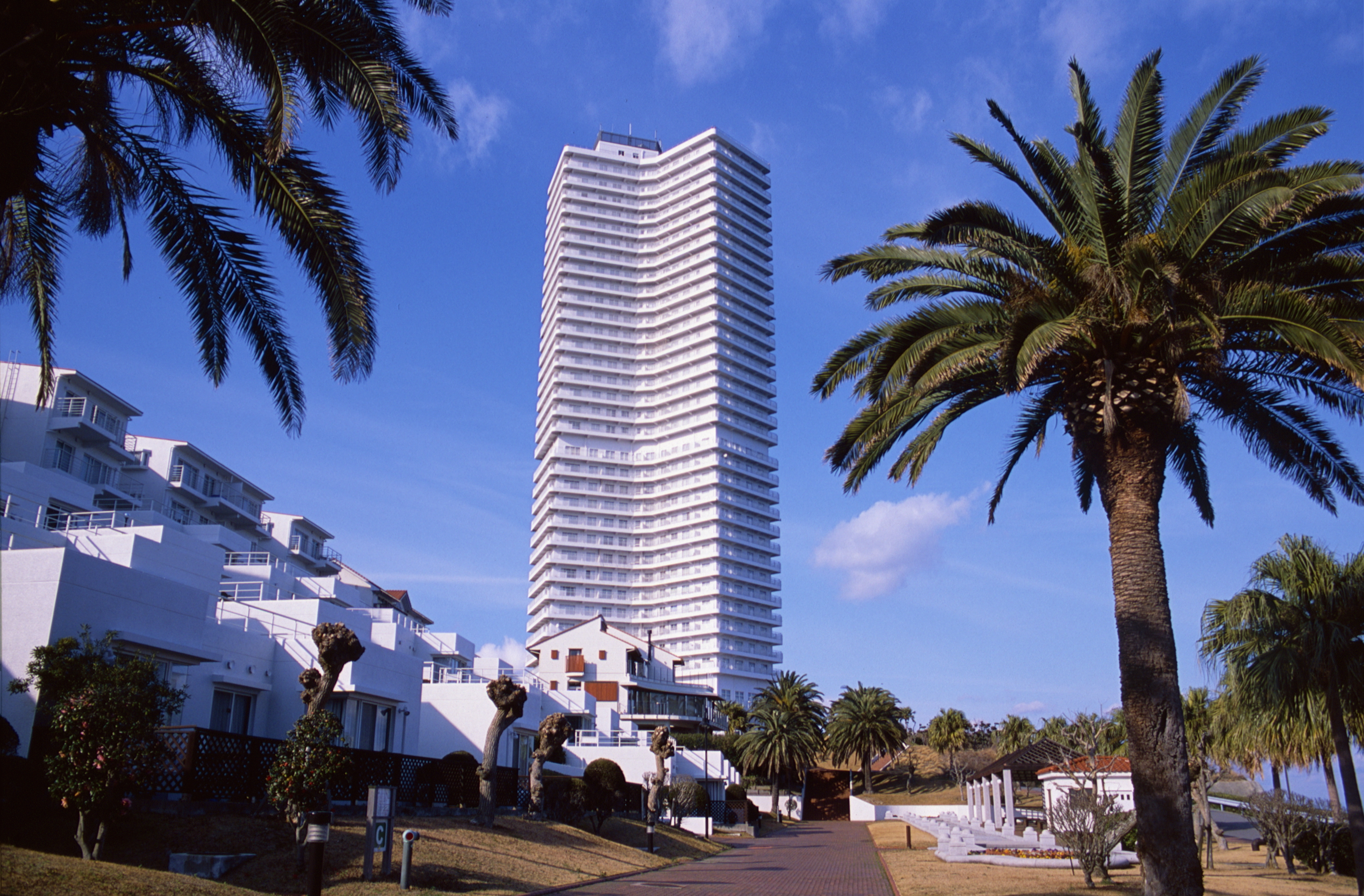
Citta Napoli

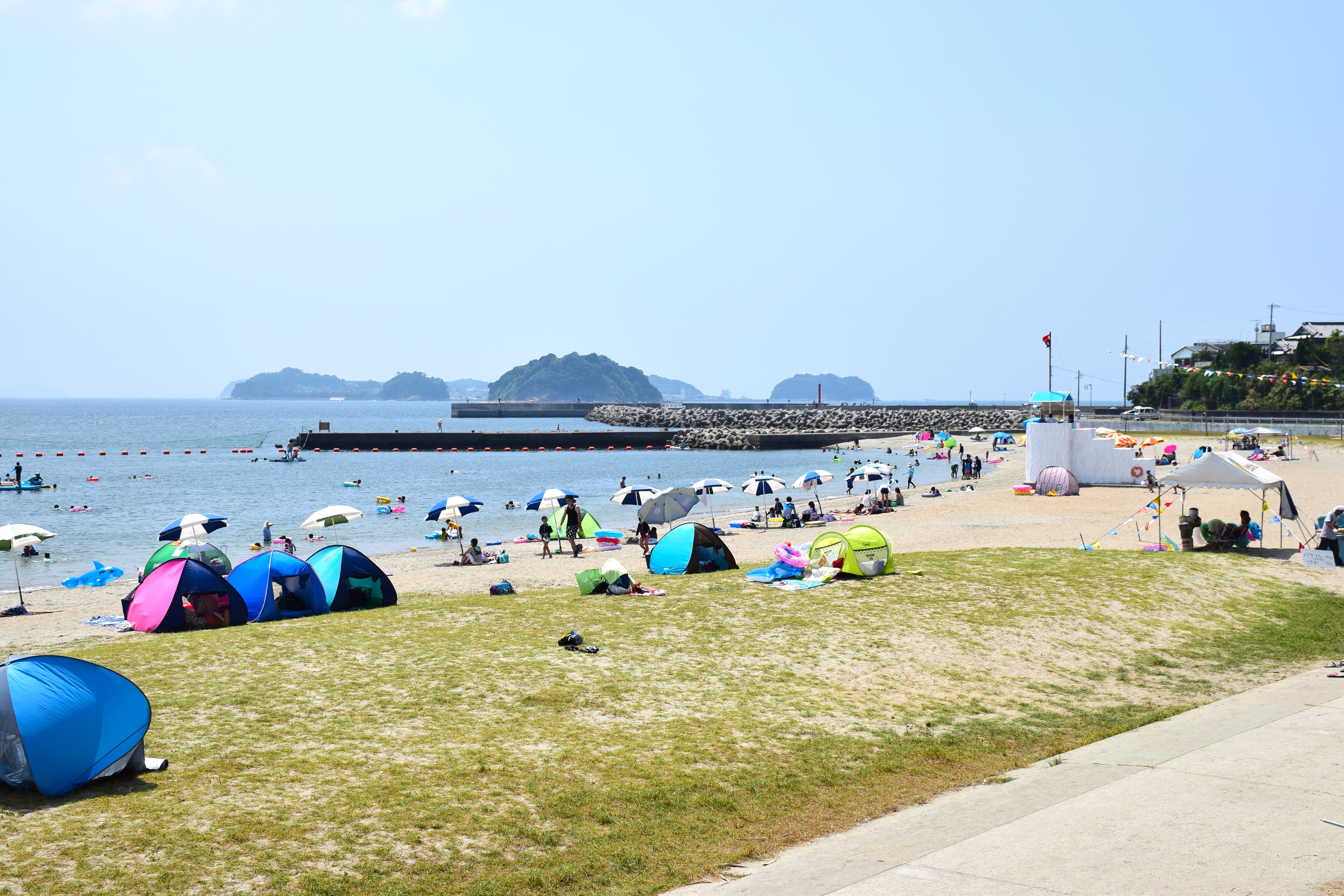
Himakajima

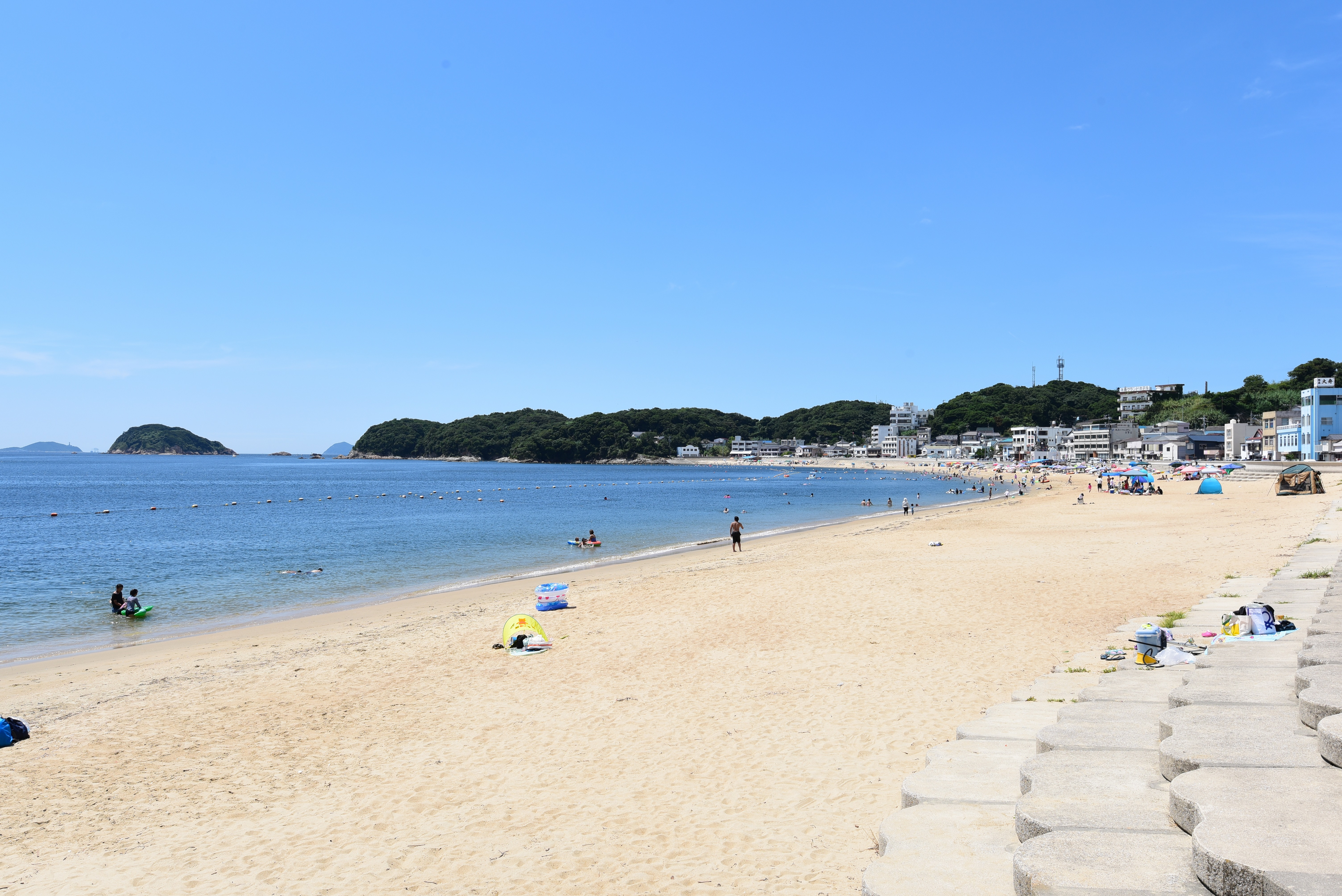
Shinojima

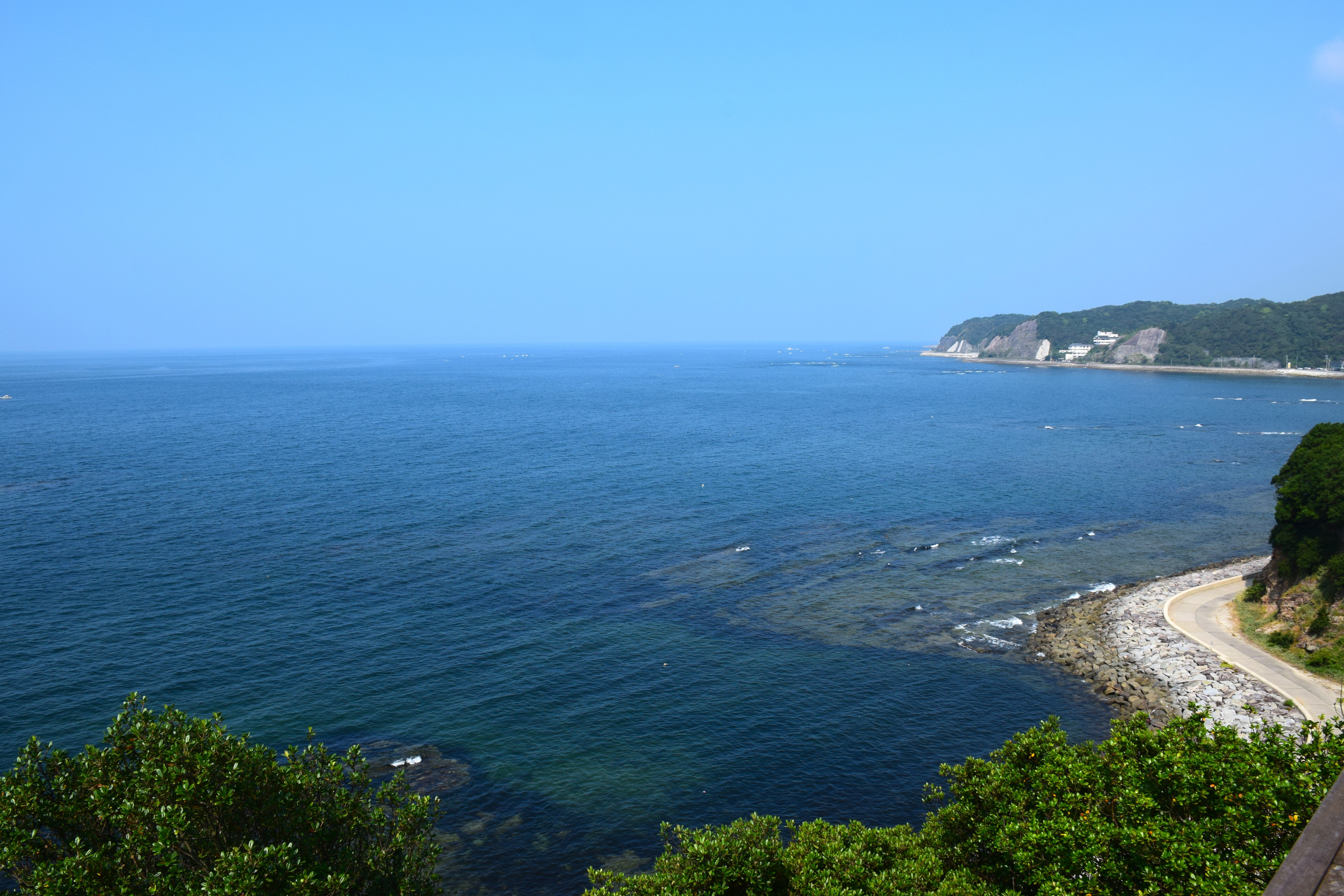
Cape Hazu
