= Japan at the Olympics =

- IOC code: JPN
- NOC: Japanese Olympic Committee
- Website: www.joc.or.jp (in English and Japanese)
- Medals Ranked 10th: Gold 211 Silver 198 Bronze 233 Total 642

Summer appearances
- 1912; 1920; 1924; 1928; 1932; 1936; 1948; 1952; 1956; 1960; 1964; 1968; 1972; 1976; 1980; 1984; 1988; 1992; 1996; 2000; 2004; 2008; 2012; 2016; 2020; 2024; 2028

Winter appearances
- 1928; 1932; 1936; 1948; 1952; 1956; 1960; 1964; 1968; 1972; 1976; 1980; 1984; 1988; 1992; 1994; 1998; 2002; 2006; 2010; 2014; 2018; 2022; 2026

Japan first participated at the Olympic Games in 1912, and has competed at almost every Games since then. The nation was not invited to the 1948 Games after World War II, and was part of the American-led boycott of the 1980 Summer Olympics in Moscow.

Since its first (ultimately canceled) bid in 1940, Japan has hosted the Olympics four times: in 1964, 1972, 1998, and 2021 (originally 2020). Each occasion coincided with critical turning points in Japan's domestic development or global standing. The 1964 Tokyo Olympics were a pivotal moment in Japan's postwar recovery, offering a visual spectacle of modernization that included the unveiling of the Shinkansen bullet train and the rapid reconstruction of Tokyo's infrastructure. The event symbolized Japan's reintegration into the international community after its defeat in World War II, marking its transition from a militaristic empire to a peaceful economic power aligned with Western liberal democracies.

The Olympics’ utility as a crisis-response tool became even more evident with the 1998 Nagano Winter Olympics, held in the shadow of the Asian Financial Crisis. While neighboring countries like South Korea and Thailand struggled with IMF-imposed austerity, Japan sought to distinguish itself as a stable economic force capable of weathering regional turmoil. The Nagano Olympics not only aimed to boost tourism and consumer confidence but also featured performances by Western orchestras and artists, symbolizing Japan's cultural connectivity and shared values with the West.

The decision to pursue the 2020 Tokyo Olympics—despite the enormous public cost and eventual delay due to COVID-19—reflected similar motivations. Government officials emphasized the Games as a necessary stimulus for Japan's sluggish economy and an opportunity to showcase its technological sophistication and preparedness in crisis.

Japan won its first medals in 1920, and its first gold medals in 1928. Japanese athletes have won 542 medals at the Summer Olympic Games (except art competitions), with the most gold medals won in judo, gymnastics, wrestling, and swimming, as of the end of the 2020 Summer Olympics. Japan has also won 76 medals at the Winter Olympic Games. Its most successful Olympics is the 2020 Games hosted in Tokyo.

The Japanese Olympic Committee was created in 1911 and recognized in 1912.

== Timeline of participation ==
Olympic Year/s	Teams		
1912–1936	Japan		
1948–1960		South Korea	Japan
1964 W	North Korea (NKO)	South Korea	Japan
1964 S–1968		South Korea	Japan
1972–present	North Korea (PRK)	South Korea	Japan

== Hosted Games ==
Japan have hosted the Games on four occasions, including the 2020 Summer Olympics (which was postponed to 2021 due to the COVID-19 pandemic):

Games	Dates	Host city
1964 Summer Olympics	10–24 October 1964	Tokyo
1972 Winter Olympics	3–13 February 1972	Sapporo
1998 Winter Olympics	7–22 February 1998	Nagano
2020 Summer Olympics	23 July – 8 August 2021	Tokyo

=== Cancelled games ===
Games	Host city	Relocation prior to cancellation
1940 Summer Olympics	Tokyo	Helsinki, Finland
1940 Winter Olympics	Sapporo	Garmisch-Partenkirchen, Germany

=== Unsuccessful bids ===
Games	City	Winner of bid
1960 Summer Olympics	Tokyo	Rome, Italy
1968 Winter Olympics	Sapporo	Grenoble, France
1984 Winter Olympics	Sapporo	Sarajevo, Yugoslavia
1988 Summer Olympics	Nagoya	Seoul, South Korea
2008 Summer Olympics	Osaka	Beijing, China
2016 Summer Olympics	Tokyo	Rio de Janeiro, Brazil

== Medal tables ==
=== Medals by Summer Games ===
Host country

Games	Athletes	Gold	Silver	Bronze	Total	Rank
(Sweden) 1912 Stockholm	2	0	0	0	0	–
(Belgium) 1920 Antwerp	15	0	2	0	2	17
(French Third Republic) 1924 Paris	19	0	0	1	1	23
(Netherlands) 1928 Amsterdam	43	2	2	1	5	15
(United States) 1932 Los Angeles	131	7	7	4	18	5
(Nazi Germany) 1936 Berlin ^{[Art]}	156	6	4	8	18	8
(United Kingdom) 1948 London	did not participate					
(Finland) 1952 Helsinki	69	1	6	2	9	17
(Australia) 1956 Melbourne	110	4	10	5	19	10
(Italy) 1960 Rome	162	4	7	7	18	8
(Japan) 1964 Tokyo	328	16	5	8	29	3
1968 Mexico City	171	11	7	7	25	3
(West Germany) 1972 Munich	184	13	8	8	29	5
(Canada) 1976 Montreal	213	9	6	10	25	5
(Soviet Union) 1980 Moscow	boycotted					
(United States) 1984 Los Angeles	226	10	8	14	32	7
(South Korea) 1988 Seoul	255	4	3	7	14	14
(Spain) 1992 Barcelona	256	3	8	11	22	17
(United States) 1996 Atlanta	306	3	6	5	14	23
(Australia) 2000 Sydney	266	5	8	5	18	15
(Greece) 2004 Athens	306	16	9	12	37	5
(China) 2008 Beijing	332	9	8	8	25	8
(United Kingdom) 2012 London	295	7	14	17	38	11
(Brazil) 2016 Rio de Janeiro	338	12	8	21	41	6
(Japan) 2020 Tokyo	556	27	14	17	58	3
(France) 2024 Paris	403	20	12	13	45	3
(United States) 2028 Los Angeles	future event					
(Australia) 2032 Brisbane	future event					
Total (24/30)	5,142	189	162	191	542	8

- ^{Art comp.} Art competitions (1912–1948) are not included in the medal table above, as they were non-sports events formerly part of the Olympic Games. (Note: In 1952, art competition medals, as well as the gold medal awards for feats in alpinism and aeronautics, were removed from the official national medal counts. Only since 2021 have they been officially listed again by the IOC in the medal tables and respective NOC profile on its website. Japan won a total of two art competition medals (2 bronze), both at the 1936 Summer Olympics.) Japan won a total of two art competition medals (2 bronze), both at the 1936 Summer Olympics.

=== Medals by Winter Games ===
Host country

Games	Athletes	Gold	Silver	Bronze	Total	Rank
(Switzerland) 1928 St. Moritz	6	0	0	0	0	–
(United States) 1932 Lake Placid	16	0	0	0	0	–
(Nazi Germany) 1936 Garmisch-Partenkirchen	31	0	0	0	0	–
(Switzerland) 1948 St. Moritz	did not participate					
(Norway) 1952 Oslo	13	0	0	0	0	–
(Italy) 1956 Cortina d'Ampezzo	10	0	1	0	1	11
(United States) 1960 Squaw Valley	41	0	0	0	0	–
(Austria) 1964 Innsbruck	47	0	0	0	0	–
(France) 1968 Grenoble	61	0	0	0	0	–
(Japan) 1972 Sapporo	85	1	1	1	3	11
(Austria) 1976 Innsbruck	58	0	0	0	0	–
(United States) 1980 Lake Placid	50	0	1	0	1	15
(Socialist Federal Republic of Yugoslavia) 1984 Sarajevo	39	0	1	0	1	14
(Canada) 1988 Calgary	48	0	0	1	1	16
(France) 1992 Albertville	60	1	2	4	7	11
(Norway) 1994 Lillehammer	59	1	2	2	5	11
(Japan) 1998 Nagano	156	5	1	4	10	7
(United States) 2002 Salt Lake City	103	0	1	1	2	21
(Italy) 2006 Turin	110	1	0	0	1	18
(Canada) 2010 Vancouver	94	0	3	2	5	20
(Russia) 2014 Sochi	113	1	4	3	8	17
(South Korea) 2018 Pyeongchang	124	4	5	4	13	11
(China) 2022 Beijing	124	3	7	8	18	12
(Italy) 2026 Milano Cortina	121	5	7	12	24	10
(France) 2030 French Alps	future event					
(United States) 2034 Utah	future event					
Total (23/25)	1,569	22	36	42	100	17

=== Medals by summer sport ===
Leading in that sport

Sport	Gold	Silver	Bronze	Total
Judo	51	23	30	104
Wrestling	45	23	19	87
Gymnastics	36	34	37	107
Swimming	24	28	32	84
Athletics	8	10	10	28
Skateboarding	5	3	1	9
Volleyball	3	3	3	9
Fencing	3	3	2	8
Boxing	3	0	5	8
Weightlifting	2	3	10	15
Softball	2	1	1	4
Table tennis	1	4	5	10
Shooting	1	2	3	6
Badminton	1	1	4	6
Baseball	1	1	2	4
Karate	1	1	1	3
Equestrian	1	0	1	2
Breaking	1	0	0	1
Artistic swimming	0	4	10	14
Archery	0	3	4	7
Cycling	0	2	3	5
Sailing	0	2	1	3
Sport climbing	0	2	1	3
Tennis	0	2	1	3
Football	0	1	1	2
Golf	0	1	1	2
Surfing	0	1	1	2
Basketball	0	1	0	1
Diving	0	1	0	1
Field hockey	0	1	0	1
Modern pentathlon	0	1	0	1
Canoeing	0	0	1	1
Taekwondo	0	0	1	1
Totals (33 entries)	189	162	191	542

=== Medals by winter sport ===
Sport	Gold	Silver	Bronze	Total
Speed skating	5	10	14	29
Snowboarding	5	5	6	16
Figure skating	4	8	5	17
Ski jumping	4	7	7	18
Nordic combined	2	3	2	7
Freestyle skiing	1	1	5	7
Short track speed skating	1	0	2	3
Curling	0	1	1	2
Alpine skiing	0	1	0	1
Totals (9 entries)	22	36	42	100

== Medals in art competitions ==
In addition to its accomplishments in sport, Japan has also earned recognition in Olympic art competitions—one of the three non-sports events once included in the Olympic Games. The country won a total of two art competition medals (2 bronze), both at the 1936 Summer Olympics. These events were part of the official Olympic program in seven Summer Games, from 1912 to 1948. In 1952, the International Olympic Committee (IOC) formally discontinued all non-sport events (including art competitions), as well as awards for feats (such as alpinism and aeronautics). These were subsequently removed from official national medal counts.

=== Medalists ===
Medal	Name	Games	Event	Piece
Bronze	Ryuji Fujita	(Germany) 1936 Berlin	Painting, Paintings	"Ice Hockey"
Bronze	Sujaku Suzuki	(Germany) 1936 Berlin	Painting, Drawings And Water Colors	"Classical Horse Racing in Japan"

== Hosted Olympics mottos ==
=== 1964 Summer Olympics ===
The 1964 Summer Olympics marks Japan hosting its first Olympic Games. It was held in the capital Tokyo. It was also the first time it was held in Asia.

=== 1972 Winter Olympics ===
The 1972 Winter Olympics marks the second time Olympics held in Japan. They were held in Sapporo.

Because of its snowy geographic, Japan would hosts its first Winter Olympics. It was also the first winter olympics held in Asia.

=== 1998 Winter Olympics ===
The 1998 Winter Olympics was the third time Japan hosted the Olympics and second for Winter. Was held at Nagano. The motto of the games is Coexistence with Nature (自然との共存)

=== 2020 Summer Olympics ===
The 2020 Summer Olympics marks the fourth time the Olympics was held in Japan. It was the first time it was held one year late (2021 instead of 2020) following the worldwide COVID-19 pandemic. It marks the second time it was held in Tokyo. Its motto was United by Emotion (感動で、私たちはひとつになる). During that time, only the English version was used.

This motto appeals that "Sports enable us to overcome different environments and become one world through emotions such as joy and excitement that the athletes' competitive performances bring together in our hearts."

== See also ==
- List of flag bearers for Japan at the Olympics
- Category:Olympic competitors for Japan
- Japan at the Youth Olympics
- Japan at the Paralympics
- Japan at the Asian Games
