= Shibahara =

Shibahara (written: 柴原 or 芝原) is a Japanese surname. Notable people with the surname include:

- Chiyako Shibahara (芝原 チヤコ; born 1970), Japanese voice actress
- Ena Shibahara (柴原 瑛菜; born 1998), Japanese-American tennis player
- Hiroshi Shibahara (柴原 洋; born 1974), Japanese baseball player
- Makoto Shibahara (柴原 誠; born 1992), Japanese footballer
- Tsuneo Shibahara (柴原 恒雄; born 1917), Japanese diver

== See also ==
- Shibahara Station, a monorail station in Toyonaka, Osaka Prefecture, Japan
