= Shinojima =

Island in Japan

Native name: 篠島
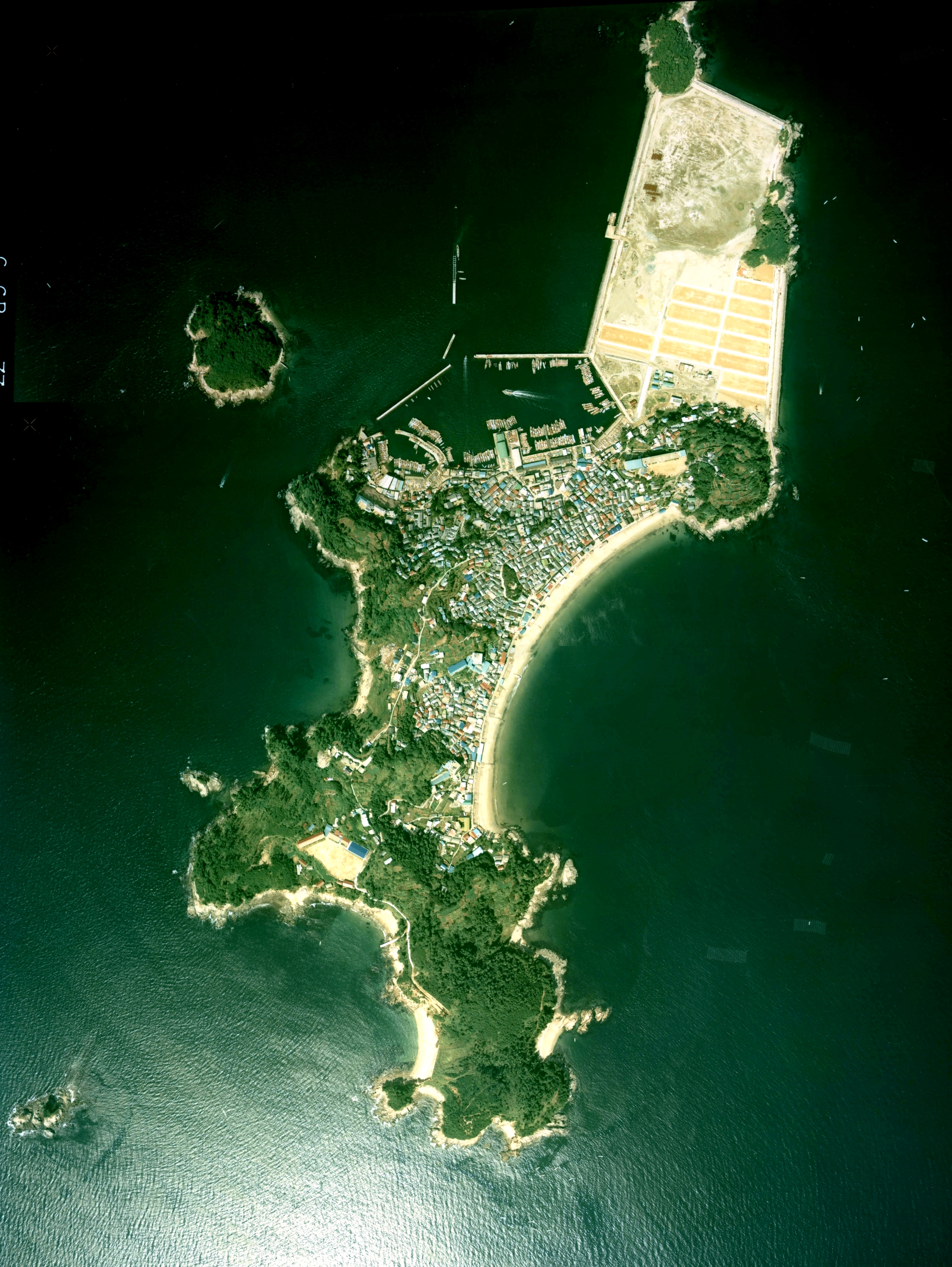
- Aerial photograph of Shinojima

- Location within Aichi Prefecture Location within Japan

Geography
- Location: Mikawa Bay, Aichi Prefecture, Japan
- Coordinates: 34°40′30″N 137°0′15″E
- Area: 0.94 km^{2} (0.36 sq mi)
- Coastline: 8,200 m (26900 ft)
- Highest elevation: 49 m (161 ft)

Administration
- Japan
- Prefecture: Aichi
- District: Chita
- Town: Minamichita

Demographics
- Population: 1,653 (2015)
- Ethnic groups: Japanese

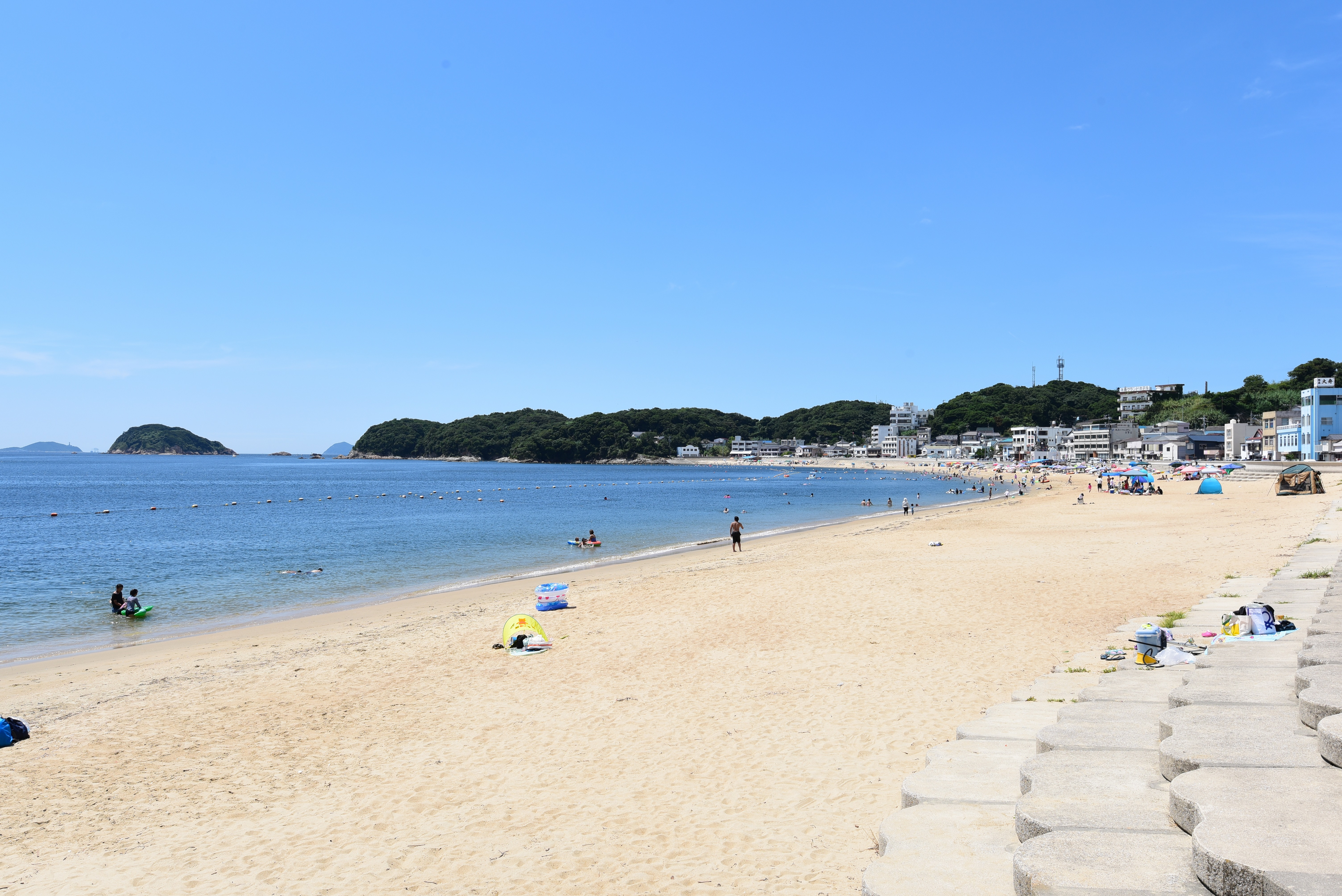
Shinojima Beach

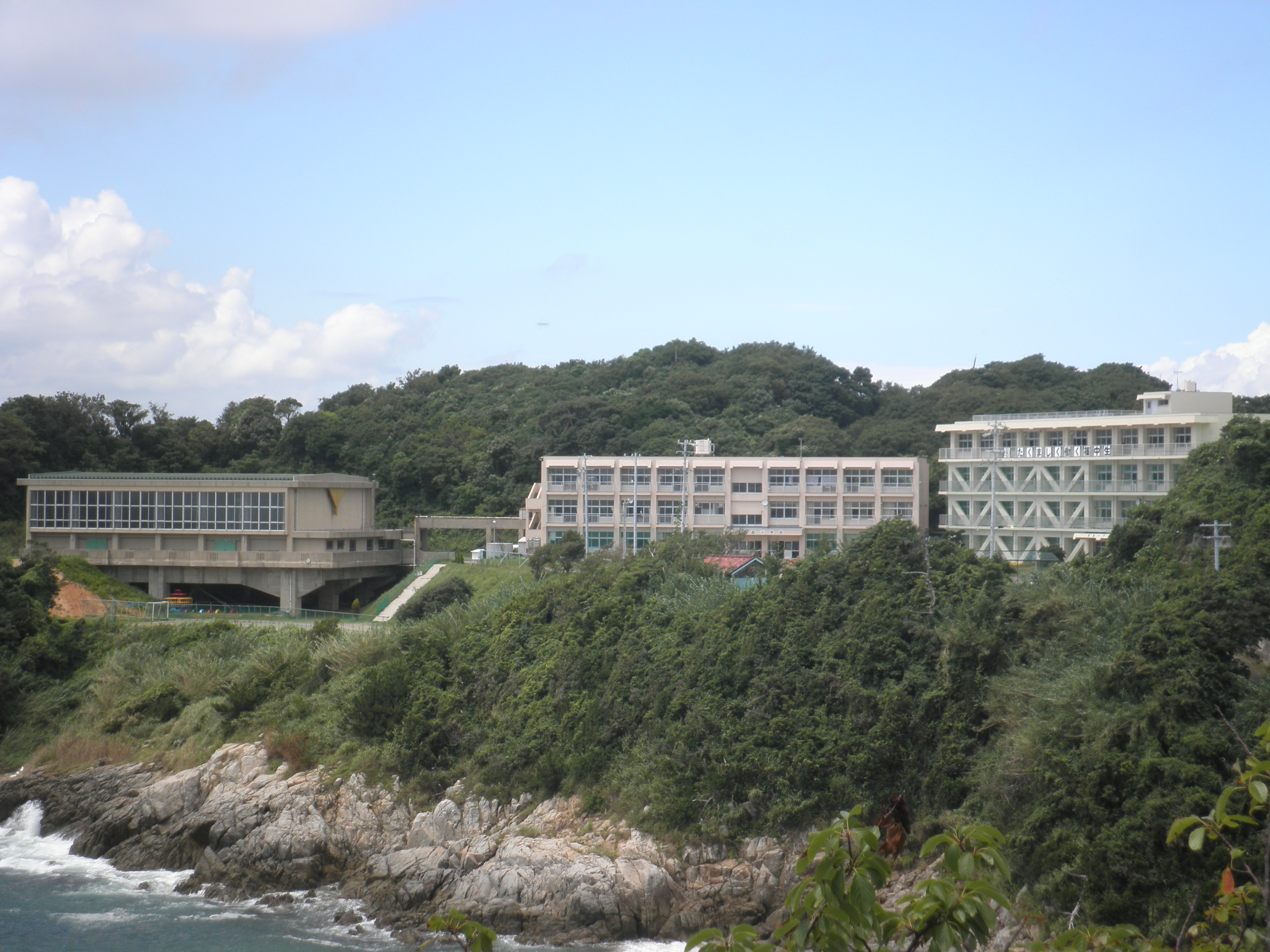
Shino Junior High school

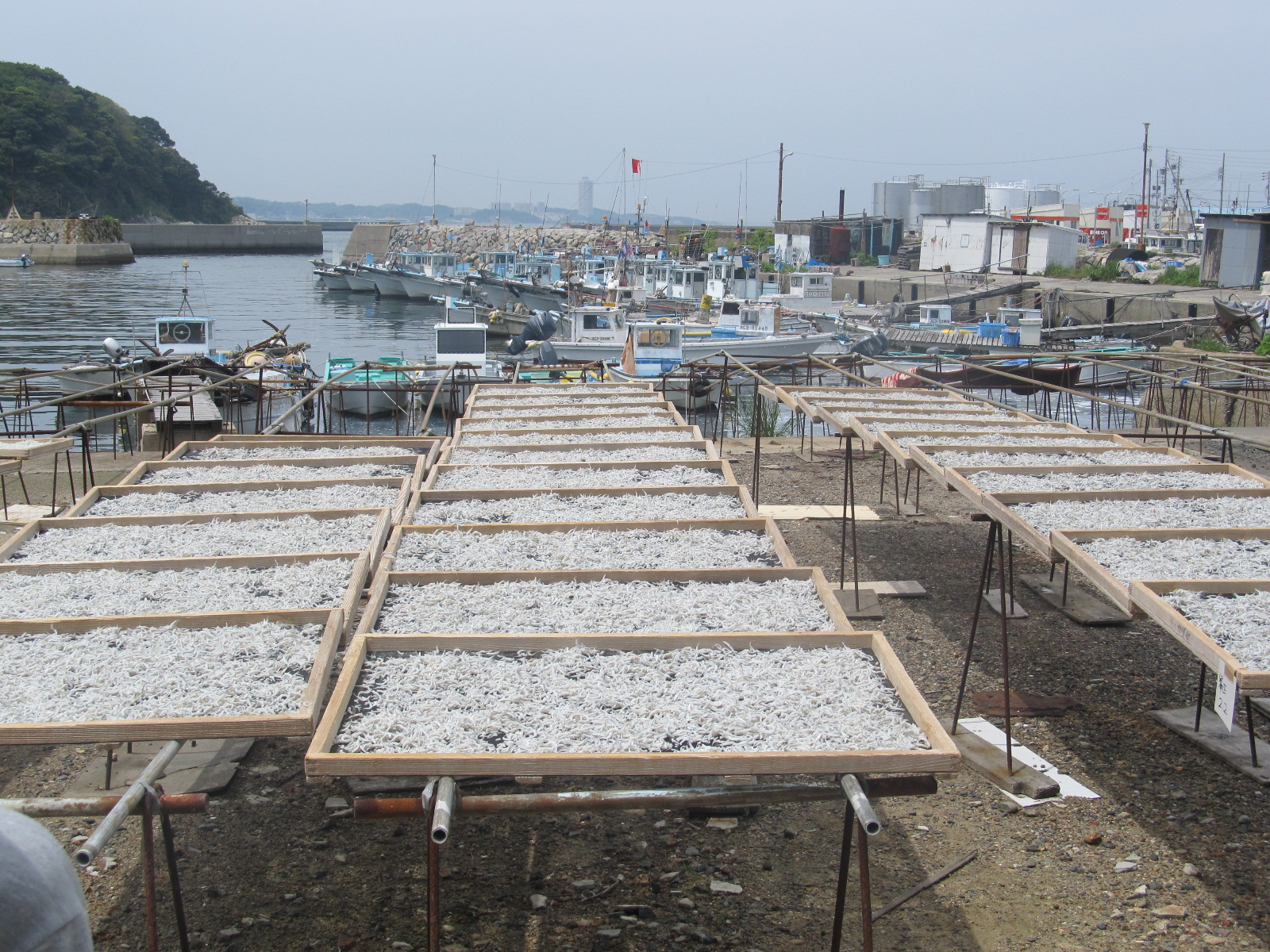
Shinojima Fishing Port

Shinojima (篠島) is an inhabited island in Mikawa Bay on the Pacific coast of Japan. The island is administered as part of the town of Minamichita in Aichi Prefecture, Japan. As of 2015, the island's population was 1,653 inhabitants in 622 households. All of the island is within the borders of the Mikawa-wan Quasi-National Park.

== Geography ==
Shinojima is located approximately 10 kilometers from either Chita Peninsula or Atsumi Peninsula and three kilometers south of Himakajima. The highest point on the island is 49 meters, and is located in approximately the center of the island. Settlement is concentrated in a single hamlet. The total area of the island is 0.94 square kilometers. The island is rocky, and is surrounded by numerous offshore rocks and reefs.

=== Minor associated islands ===
Shinojima has nine smaller associated islands – Kijima, Oisojima, Chikimijima, Nojima, Matsushima, Togamejima, Hirashima, Koisojima, and Nakatejima. Due to modern landfill work, Koisojima and Nakatejima are now physically attached to the main Shinojima island.

== History ==
=== Earliest settlement ===
Shinojima has been inhabited since at least the Jōmon period. On Koisojima, archaeologists found ancient pottery dating back to the early Jomon period, roughly 9000 years ago. At Shimei Shrine, a shell mound was unearthed containing jomon pottery, notched deer antlers, and bone and antler tools. Archaeological layers containing pottery, stone tools, accessories and other items dating to the late Jomon, roughly 4000 years ago, have been found throughout the island. Archaeologists have also found Yayoi period and Kofun period remains.

=== Links with Ise Shrine ===
Long associated with Ise Shrine, the island is mentioned in the Nara period Man'yōshū poetry anthology. It has supplied salted and dried sea bream to the shrine for use as offerings since before the Nara period. These offerings are made three times a year. The salted sea bream are first blessed in the Obendai Dedication Ceremony on Shinojima, before being transported to Ise City by fishing boat. Finally they are offered to the deity at the Gojoden in the Ise Shrine as part of a Shinto festival.

Due to its connection with Ise Shrine, during these earlier periods, Shimojima belonged to the Shima Province (later Ise Province), despite its geographical distance. During the reconstruction of Ise Shrine every twenty years, one of the buildings from Ise Shrine is always dismantled and shipped to Shinojima, where it is re-erected as the honden of the local Shimmei Jinja, founded in 771 AD.

=== Later periods ===
During the Edo period, it was part of the holdings of Owari Domain under the Tokugawa shogunate and contained a fishing settlement. Kato Kiyomasa is said to have used granite quarried on Shinojima in the construction of Nagoya Castle. With the establishment of the modern municipalities system after the start of the Meiji period, the island was organized as a village within Chita District, Aichi. It merged with surrounding towns and villages to form the town of Minamichita on June 1, 1961.

== Fisheries ==
The waters around Shinojima are teeming with fish, and support strong fisheries of red snapper, oysters, fugu, and conger eel. The island catches the most whitebait (shirasu) of any fishery area in Japan. Because of the ready availability of seafood, it appears in many of the regional dishes of the island.

== Flora and fauna ==
The area around Shinojima is a breeding ground for the endangered Red Sea turtle.

== Tourism ==
In August 2024, actor and celebrity Junior Chihara was appointed tourism ambassador for Shinojima. He became a fan of the island after travelling there for a TV show he was a part of.

== Festivals ==
Shinoshima Gion Festival – held in July (July 13 in 2024), this is the island's major festival.

The Shinojima music festival has been held in early August since 2007. In returned in 2024 after a five-year hiatus due to the COVID epidemic.

== Access ==
Shinojima is 10 minutes by high speed ferry, or 20 minutes by car ferry from Morozaki Port, 30 minutes by high speed ferry from Kowa Port, and 25 minutes by high speed ferry from Irago Port. Ferries to and from the island are run by Meitetsu.

== See also ==
- List of islands of Japan
