= Therese Rampl =

Austrian diver 1906–1969

Theresia Josefine "Therese" Rampl
Personal information
- Nationality: Austrian
- Born: 14 January 1906; Baden bei Wien, Austria-Hungary
- Died: 19 July 1969 (aged 63); Vienna, Austria

Sport
- Sport: Diving

Theresia Josefine "Therese" Rampl (14 January 1906 – 19 July 1969) was an Austrian diver. She competed in the women's 10 metre platform event at the 1936 Summer Olympics.
