= Käthe Köhler =

German diver

Personal information
- Born: 10 November 1913 Hamburg, Germany
- Died: 30 November 2001 (aged 88)

Sport
- Sport: Diving
Medal record
Representing Germany
Olympic Games
Bronze medal – third place	1936 Berlin	10 m platform

Käthe Köhler (10 November 1913 – 30 November 2001) was a German diver who competed in the 1936 Summer Olympics. In 1936 she won the bronze medal in the 10 metre platform event.
