= Diving at the 1936 Summer Olympics – Women's 10 metre platform =

Women's 10 metre platform at the Games of the XI Olympiad

Medalists
1st place, gold medalist(s)		Dorothy Poynton-Hill	United States
2nd place, silver medalist(s)		Velma Dunn	United States
3rd place, bronze medalist(s)		Käthe Köhler	Germany

The women's 10 metre platform, also reported as high diving, was one of four diving events on the diving at the 1936 Summer Olympics programme.

The competition was actually held from both the 10 metre and 5 metre platforms and consisted of one set of dives:

- Compulsory dives (Thursday, 13 August)
  Divers performed four pre-chosen dives – a running straight header forward, standing straight somersault backward (5 metre), a running straight header forward and a standing straight header forward (10 metre).

== Results ==
Place	Diver	Nation	Score
1st place, gold medalist(s)	Dorothy Poynton-Hill	United States	33.93
2nd place, silver medalist(s)	Velma Dunn	United States	33.63
3rd place, bronze medalist(s)	Käthe Köhler	Germany	33.43
4	Reiko Osawa	Japan	32.53
5	Cornelia Gilissen	United States	30.47
6	Fusako Kono	Japan	30.24
7	Jean Gilbert	Great Britain	30.16
8	Anne Ehscheidt	Germany	29.90
9	Ingeborg Sjöqvist	Sweden	29.67
10	Ann-Margret Nirling	Sweden	29.20
11	Anneliese Kapp	Germany	28.66
12	Inger Nordbø	Norway	28.62
13	Tullik Helsing	Norway	28.40
14	Masayo Osawa	Japan	28.10
15	Mette Gregaard	Denmark	27.54
16	Therese Rampel	Austria	27.16
17	Karen Margrete Andersen	Denmark	27.08
18	Madge Moulton	Great Britain	26.62
19	Lynda Adams	Canada	26.52
20	Cécile Lesprit-Poirier	France	25.56
21	Magdalene Epply-Staudinger	Austria	25.04
22	Thelma Boughner	Canada	24.30

== Sources ==
- Organisationskomitee für die XI. Olympiade Berlin 1936 e.V. (1937). "The XIth Olympic Games, Berlin 1936 - Official Report, Volume II" (PDF). Wilhelm Limpert, Berlin, S.W. 68. pp. pp.343–4. Archived from the original (pdf) on 9 July 2007.
- Herman de Wael (7 August 2001). "Diving - women's platform (Berlin 1936)".
