= Anne Ehscheidt =

German diver

Personal information
- Born: 16 July 1919 Frankfurt, Germany
- Died: 26 August 1947 (aged 28) Frankfurt, Germany

Sport
- Country: Germany
- Sport: Diving
- Event: 10 metre platform

Anne Ehscheidt (16 July 1919 – 26 August 1947) was a German diver who competed in the 1936 Summer Olympics. In 1936 she finished eighth in the 10 metre platform event. Ehscheidt committed suicide by gas on 26 August 1947, at the age of 28.
