= Cornelia Gilissen =

American diver

Personal information
- Nationality: American
- Born: September 21, 1915 New York City
- Died: March 21, 1994 (aged 78) Key Largo, Florida

Sport
- Sport: Diving

Cornelia Gilissen (September 21, 1915 – March 21, 1994) was an American diver who competed in the 1936 Summer Olympics, where she placed fifth in the 10 metre platform event. She was born in New York City.
