= Velma Dunn =

American diver

Personal information
- Born: October 9, 1918 Monrovia, California, United States
- Died: May 8, 2007 (aged 88) Whittier, California, United States

Sport
- Sport: Diving
Medal record
Representing United States
Olympic Games
Silver medal – second place	1936 Berlin	10 m platform

Velma Clancy Dunn (later Ploessel, October 9, 1918 – May 8, 2007) was an American diver who competed in the 1936 Summer Olympics. In 1936 she won the silver medal in the 10 metre platform event.
