= Himakajima =

Island in Mikawa Bay in Aichi Prefecture, Japan

Native name: 日間賀島
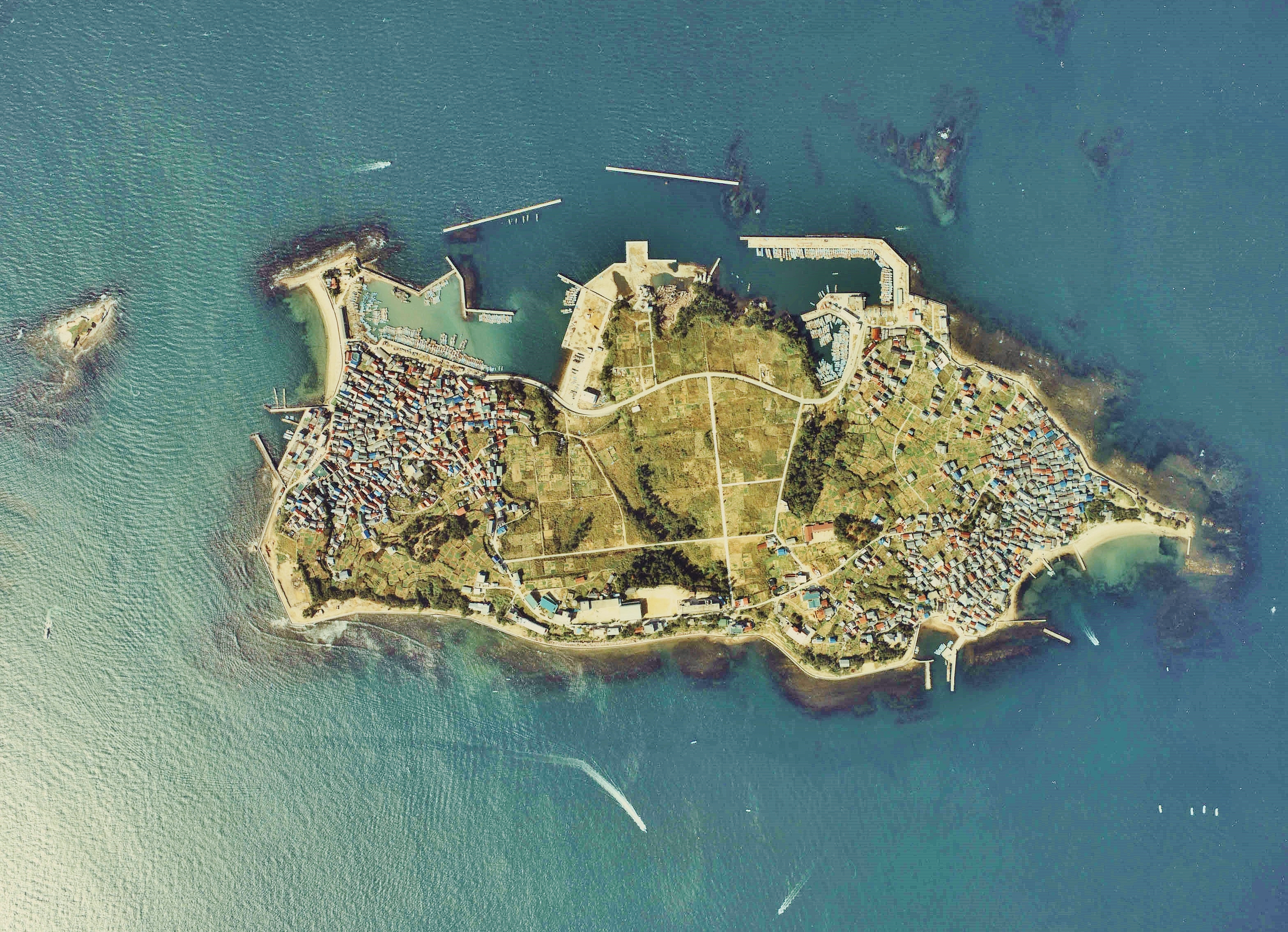
- Aerial photograph

- Location within Aichi Prefecture Location within Japan

Geography
- Location: Mikawa Bay, Aichi Prefecture, Japan
- Coordinates: 34.705°N 137.005°E
- Total islands: 1
- Area: 0.75 km^{2} (0.29 sq mi)
- Coastline: 6.0 km (3.73 mi)
- Highest elevation: 30.2 m (99.1 ft)

Administration
- Japan

Demographics
- Population: 1896 (2015)
- Ethnic groups: Japanese

Additional information
- Official website: www.himaka.com

Himakajima (日間賀島) is an inhabited island in Mikawa Bay in Aichi Prefecture, Japan off the coast of the Chita Peninsula, which is administered by the town of Minamichita, Aichi. All of the island is within the borders of the Mikawa-wan Quasi-National Park. It draws many tourists who come to eat the octopus and blowfish caught off the island and prepared there, to enjoy the onsen, to fish, or to spend time on the beach. Per the 2015 Japanese census, the island had a population of 1896 people in 607 households.

== Geography ==
Himakajima is located approximately 10 kilometers from either Chita Peninsula or Atsumi Peninsula. The highest point on the island is 30.2 meters, and is located in approximately the center of the island. Settlement is concentrated in two hamlets, one on the east and one on the west coast. The total area of the island is 0.77 square kilometers, of which approximately half is owned by the Imperial Household Agency. The island is rocky, within only 4% of its area forested, although olive trees have been introduced in recent years.

== History ==
Himakajima has been populated since prehistoric times, and appears to have been a Kofun period necropolis, with 35 kofun burial mounds thus far identified, and which have been found to contain a large number of grave goods, from the late 6th to early 7th centuries. During the Nara period it was mentioned in records as a source of shark skin and dried fish. During the Edo period, it was part of the holdings of Owari Domain under the Tokugawa shogunate and contained a fishing settlement. With the establishment of the modern municipalities system after the start of the Meiji period, the island was organized as a village within Chita District, Aichi. It merged with surrounding towns and villages to form the town of Minamichita on June 1, 1961.

== Access ==
Nagoya Railroad (Meitetsu) offers tours to Himakajima as part of its main portfolio of tour packages. From Kōwa Station, visitors can board a bus which will take them to a high-speed boat which will take them to the island in about ten minutes.

== Gallery ==
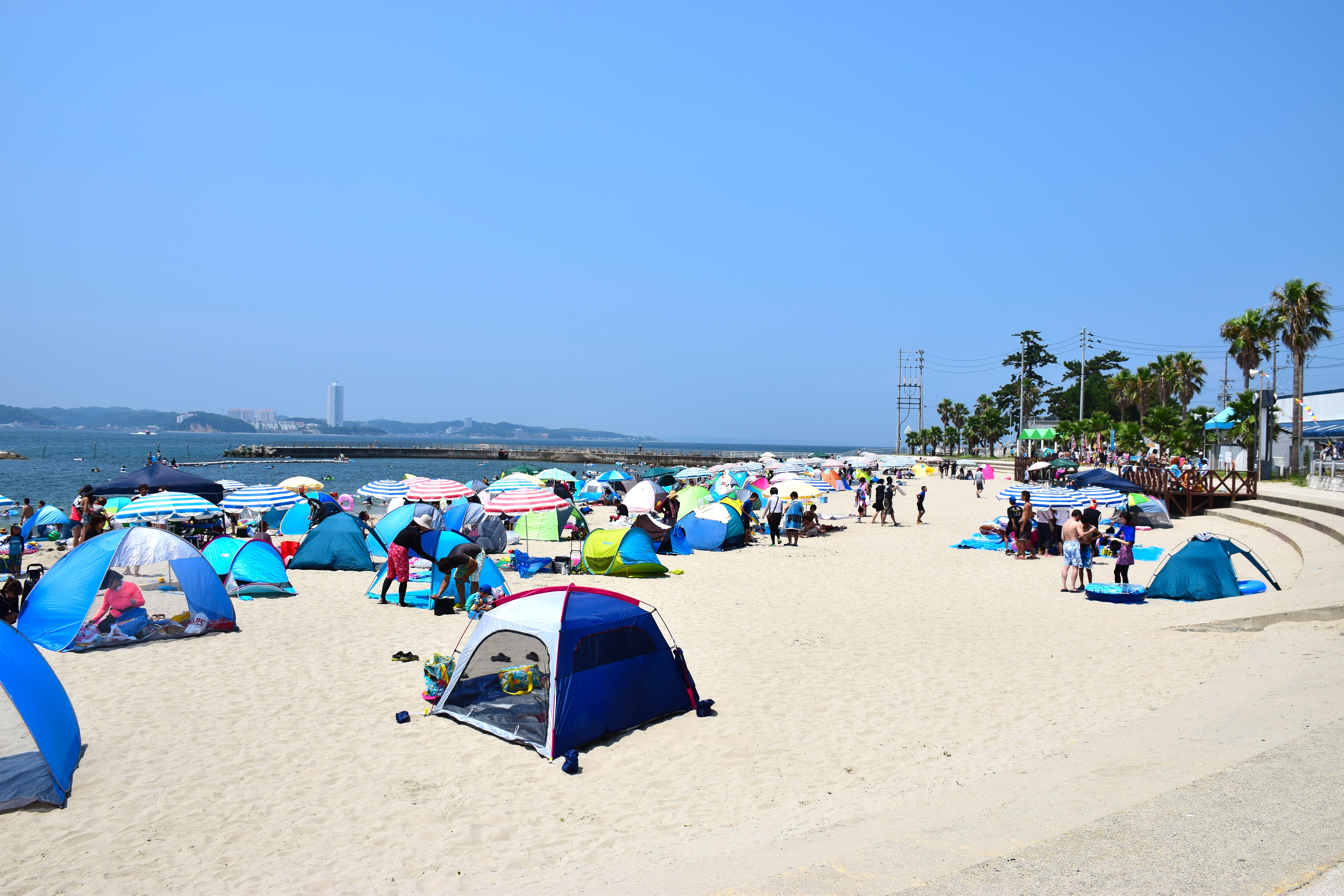
Beach

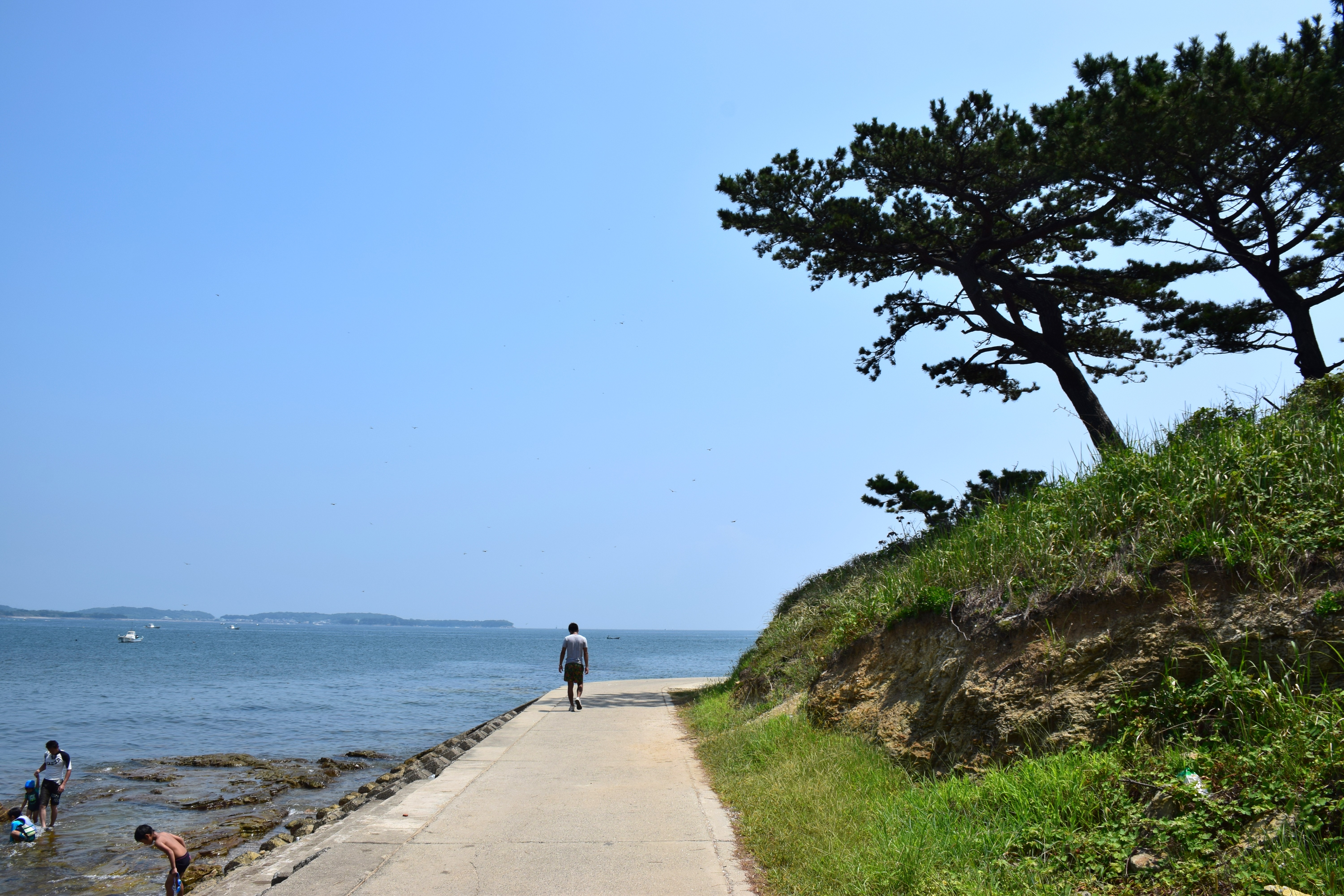
Promenade
