= Ozawa =

Ozawa (written: 小沢 or 小澤 lit. "small swamp") is a Japanese surname. Notable people with the surname include:

- Eitaro Ozawa (1909–1988), Japanese actor
- Ichirō Ozawa (born 1942), Japanese politician
- Hideaki Ozawa (born 1974), Japanese football goalkeeper
- Hiromi Ozawa (小沢 洋美; born 1961), Japanese speed skater
- Jisaburō Ozawa (1886–1966), Japanese admiral and last Commander-in-Chief of the Combined Fleet during World War II
- Juri Osada (née Ozawa), Japanese figure skater and coach
- Keiichi Ozawa (小澤 啓一; born 1933), Japanese film director
- Kenji Ozawa (born 1968), Japanese musician, nephew of Seiji Ozawa
- Maria Ozawa (born 1986), Japanese adult video (AV) actress
- Masashi Ozawa (小沢 正志; 1947–2023), Japanese professional wrestler
- Masazumi Ozawa (小澤 正澄), Japanese composer, music arranger and guitarist
- Michihiro Ozawa (born 1932), Japanese football player
- Narutaka Ozawa (born 1974), Japanese mathematician
- Natsuki Ozawa (born 1972), Japanese singer, actress and adult video (AV) performer
- Ryota Ozawa (born 1988), Japanese actor
- Sachi Ozawa (小澤 幸; born 1976), Japanese speed skater
- Sakihito Ozawa (born 1954), Japanese politician
- Seiji Ozawa (1935–2024), Japanese conductor
- Taishi Ozawa (born 1996), Japanese professional wrestler
- Tsukasa Ozawa (born 1988), Japanese football player
- Yuki Ozawa (born 1983), Japanese football player
- Yuta Ozawa (小澤 雄太; born 1985), Japanese actor

== See also ==
- Ozawa v. United States, a 1922 case in which the United States Supreme Court found Takao Ozawa, a Japanese-American, ineligible for naturalization
- Osawari Tantei: Ozawa Rina, a Nintendo DS game known as Touch Detective in the United States and Mystery Detective in Europe
- Ōsawa
