= Tullik Helsing =

Norwegian diver

Personal information
- Nationality: Norwegian
- Born: 12 December 1918; Meldal Municipality, Norway
- Died: 18 January 1994 (aged 75)

Sport
- Sport: Diving

Tullik Helsing (12 December 1918 – 18 January 1994) was a Norwegian sports diver. She was born in Meldal Municipality. She competed at the 1936 Summer Olympics in Berlin, where she placed 13th in platform.
