= Anneliese Kapp =

German diver

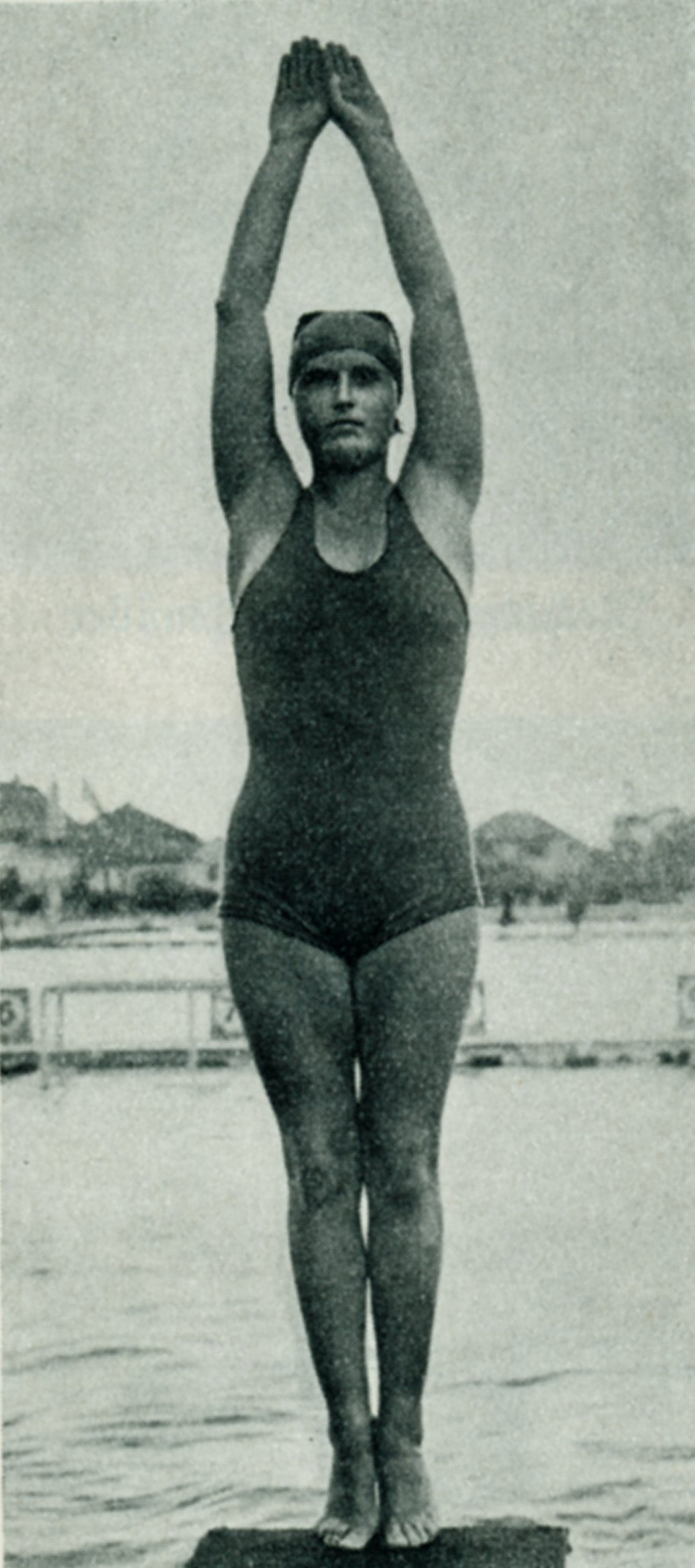

Personal information
- Nationality: German
- Born: 2 December 1908 Frankfurt, Germany
- Died: 8 October 1972 (aged 63) Mannheim, Germany

Sport
- Sport: Diving
Medal record
Women's diving
Representing Germany
European Championships
Bronze medal – third place	1934 Magdeburg	3 m springboard

Anneliese Kapp (2 December 1908 – 8 October 1972) was a German diver. She competed in the women's 10 metre platform event at the 1936 Summer Olympics.
