= Madge Moulton =

British diver

Personal information
- Nationality: British
- Born: 15 June 1917; London, England

Sport
- Sport: Diving

Madge Moulton (born 15 June 1917, date of death unknown) was a British diver. She competed in the women's 10 metre platform event at the 1936 Summer Olympics.
