= Mette Gregaard =

Danish diver

Personal information
- Nationality: Danish
- Born: 8 June 1908; Ordrup, Denmark
- Died: 19 January 1978 (aged 69); Ordrup, Denmark

Sport
- Sport: Diving

Mette Gregaard (8 June 1908 – 19 January 1978) was a Danish diver. She competed in the women's 10 metre platform event at the 1936 Summer Olympics.
