= Ōsawa Station =

Ōsawa Station is the name of two train stations in Japan:

- Ōsawa Station (Niigata) (大沢駅) in Niigata Prefecture
- Ōsawa Station (Yamagata) (大沢駅) in Yamagata Prefecture
