= Tomio Koyanagi =

Japanese diver

Personal information
- Born: August 2, 1916; Tokyo, Japan
- Died: December 14, 1971 (aged 55)

Sport
- Sport: Diving

Tomio Koyanagi (小柳 富男, Koyanagi Tomio, August 2, 1916 – December 14, 1971) was a Japanese diver who competed in the 1936 Summer Olympics. In 1936 he finished eighth in the 3 metre springboard event as well as eighth in the 10 metre platform competition.
