= Fusako Kōno =

Japanese diver (born 1916)

Personal information
- Born: 22 January 1916; Nishinomiya, Japan

Sport
- Sport: Diving

Fusako Kōno (香野 夫佐子, Kōno Fusako; born 22 January 1916, date of death unknown) was a Japanese diver who competed in the 1936 Summer Olympics.

At the 1936 Olympics she finished sixth in the 10 metre platform event and eighth in the 3 metre springboard competition.

Kōno is deceased.
