= Chita Noriai =

Japanese bus company

Chitanoriai Co., Ltd. 知多乗合株式会社
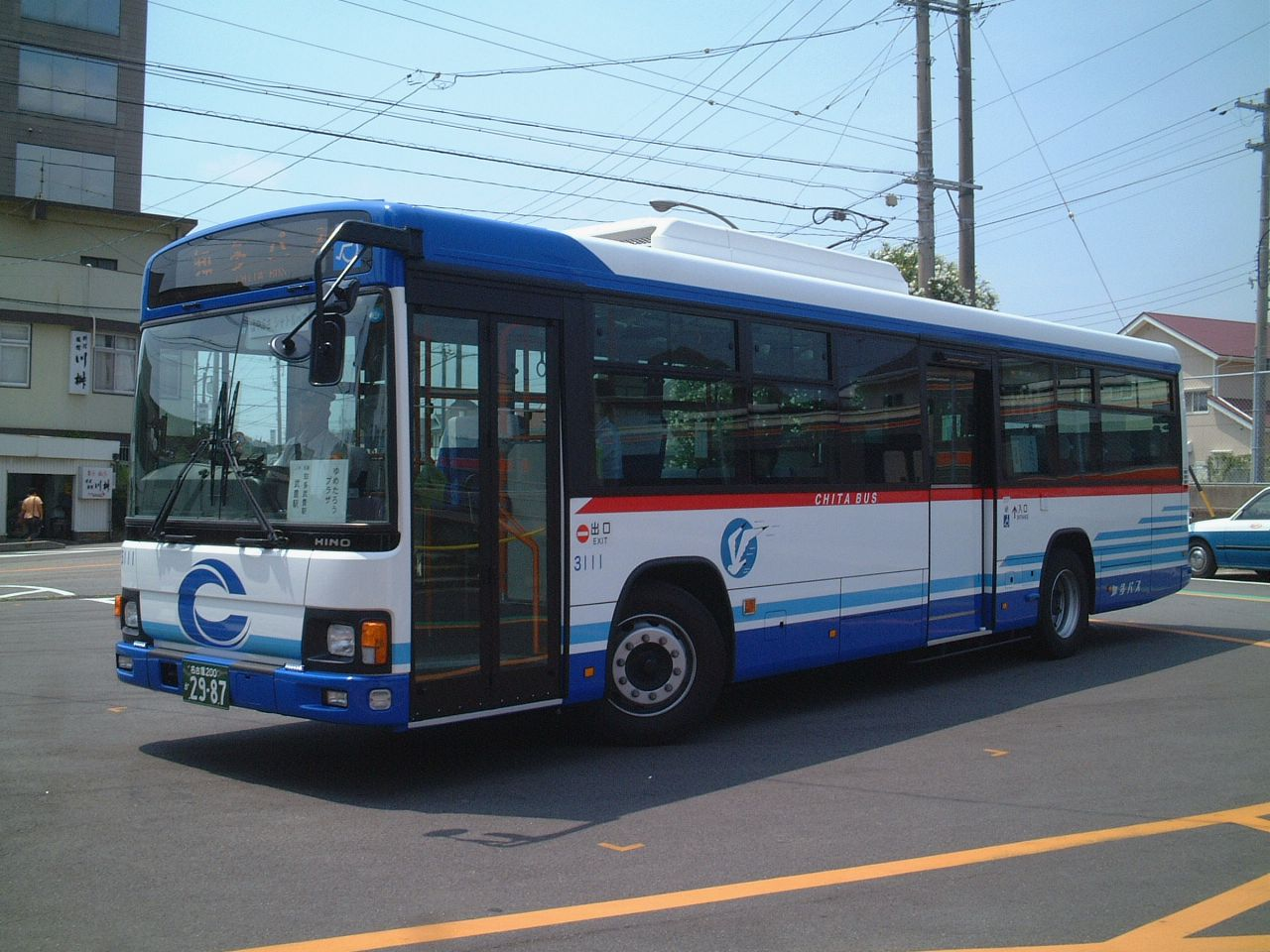
- Type: Kabushiki kaisha
- Industry: Public transportation
- Founded: June 12, 1943
- Headquarters: Handa, Aichi Prefecture, Japan
- Parent: Nagoya Railroad
- Website: Homepage

Chitanoriai Co., Ltd. (知多乗合株式会社, Chita Noriai Kabushiki-gaisha), also called Chita Bus, is a bus company in the Meitetsu Group, based in Handa, Aichi Prefecture, Japan.

== Bus Lines ==
=== Airport bus ===
- From Chūbu Centrair International Airport
  - For Kariya and Chiryū
  - For Okazaki
  - For Anjō
  - For Tokoname and Handa
    - For Kaminoma (Transit at Tokoname Sta.)
- Cargo Terminal Circular Bus

=== Regular route bus ===
- From Ōtagawa Sta.
  - For Kyōwa Sta. via Uenodai
  - For Ōbu sta. via Owari Yokosuka Sta.
  - Tokai City Circular Bus "Ranran Bus"
- From Ōbu Sta.
  - For Ōtagawa Sta. via Owari Yokosuka Sta.
  - For Aichi Health Plaza, NCGG and Genki-no-sato
  - Ōbu City Circular Bus "Fureai Bus"
- From Asakura Sta.
  - For Tsutsujigaoka
  - For Sōri
  - For Higashi Okada
  - Chita City Community Bus ""Aiai Bus"
- From Shinmaiko Sta. For Hinaga Danchi
- From Tatsumigaoka Sta. For Higashigaoka
- From Chita Handa Sta.
  - For Chūbu Centrair International Airport via Tokoname Sta.
  - For Higashiura Sta., Midorigaoka, and Kamezaki Kenja Mae via Okkawa Sta.
  - For Heartful Center Handa
- From Aoyama Sta.
  - For Kimigahashi Jūtaku W.
  - For Handa Sta.
- From Tokoname Sta.
  - For Chūbu Centrair International Airport
  - For Chita Handa Sta.
  - For Kaminoma Sta.
  - For Tokoname City Hospital
- From Kōwa Sta.
  - For Morozakikō (Port of Morozaki)
  - For Utsumi Sta. via Utsumi Senior High Sch.
  - Minamichita Town Community Bus "Umikko Bus"

== See also ==
- Meitetsu Bus
