= Reiko Ōsawa =

Japanese diver 1915–2010

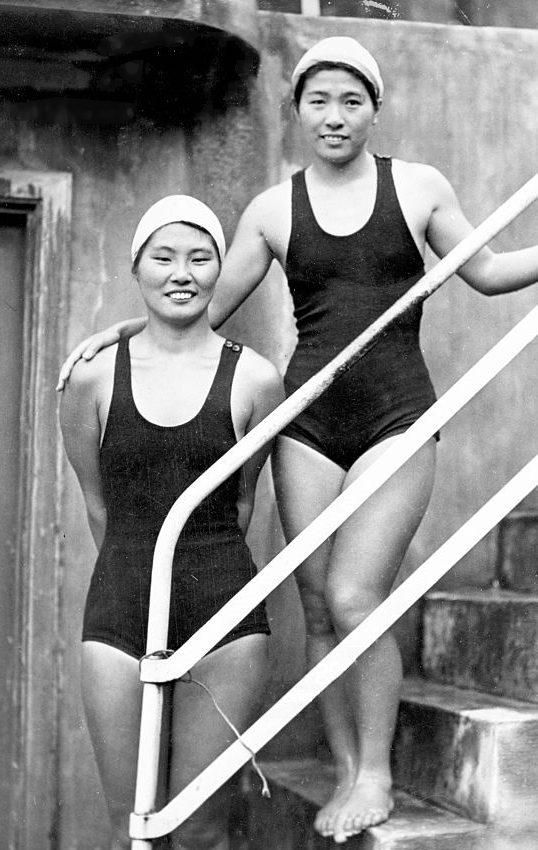
- Reiko (left) and Masayo Ōsawa at the 1936 Olympics

Personal information
- Born: November 28, 1915; Fukuoka, Japan
- Died: 2010 (aged 94–95)

Sport
- Sport: Diving

Reiko Ōsawa (大沢 礼子, Ōsawa Reiko; 28 November 1915 – 2010) was a Japanese diver. She competed at the 1936 Summer Olympics in the 10 m platform event and finished in fourth place.

Her elder sister, Masayo Ōsawa, also competed in that edition of the Olympics, in the 3 m springboard and the 10 m platform events.
