= Ryuji Fujita =

Japanese artist

Olympic medal record

Art competitions
Bronze medal – third place	1936 Berlin	Paintings

Ryūji Fujita (藤田 隆治, Fujita Ryūji; April 13, 1907 – January 28, 1965) was a Japanese artist and Olympic bronze medalist.

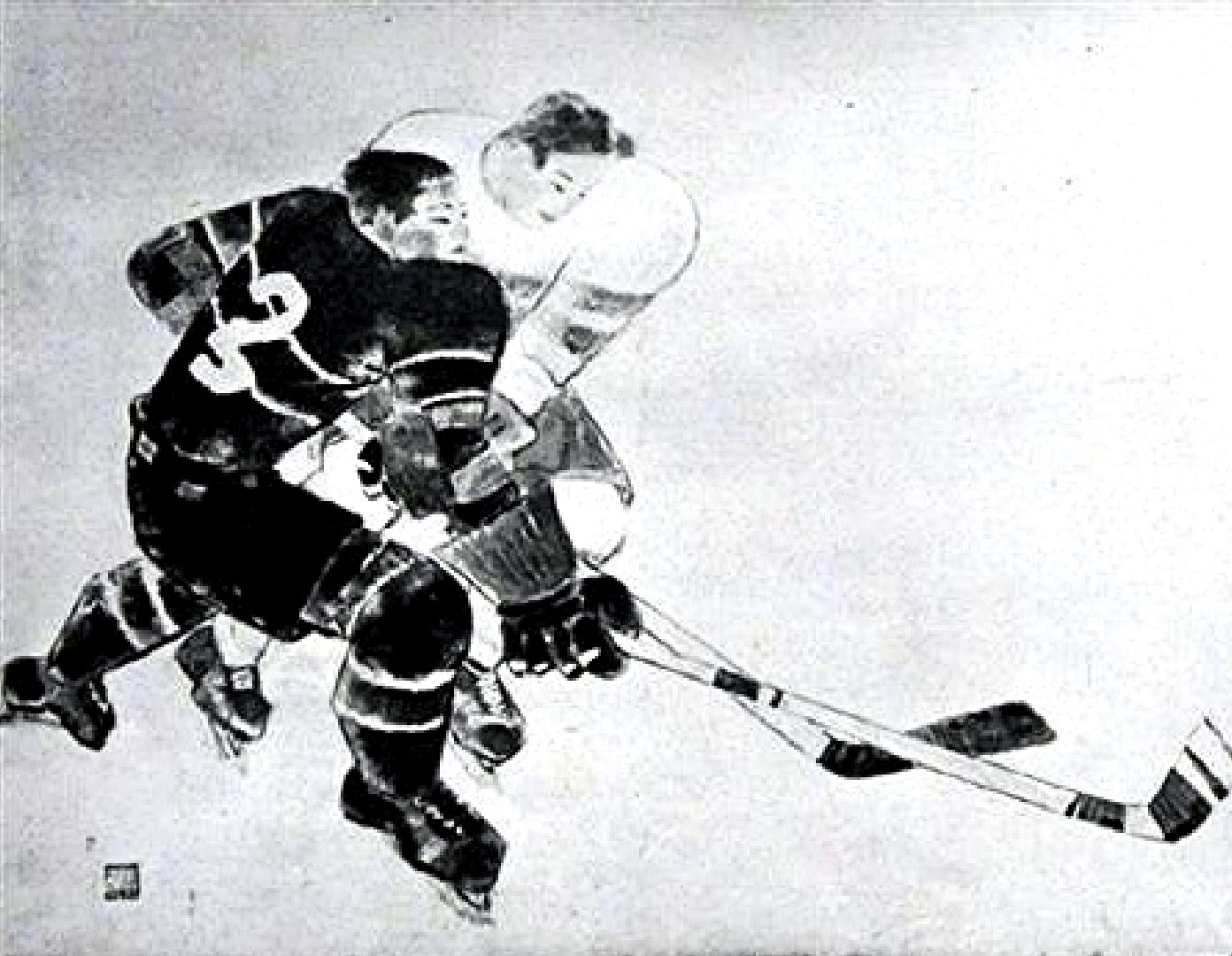
"Ice hockey", 1936

He was born in Hōhoku, which is now a part of Shimonoseki city in Yamaguchi Prefecture. His works have received accolades from the Institute of Japanese Style Painting, Seiryū Shaten, and the Bunten Exhibition. In 1934 he was one of the artists who established the Shin Nihonga Kenkyūkai.

In 1936, he won a bronze medal in the painting category in the art competitions at the Berlin Games for his "アイスホッケー" ("Ice hockey"). The piece was later purchased by the Nazi Party.
