= Mikawa Bay =

Bay to the south of Aichi Prefecture, Japan

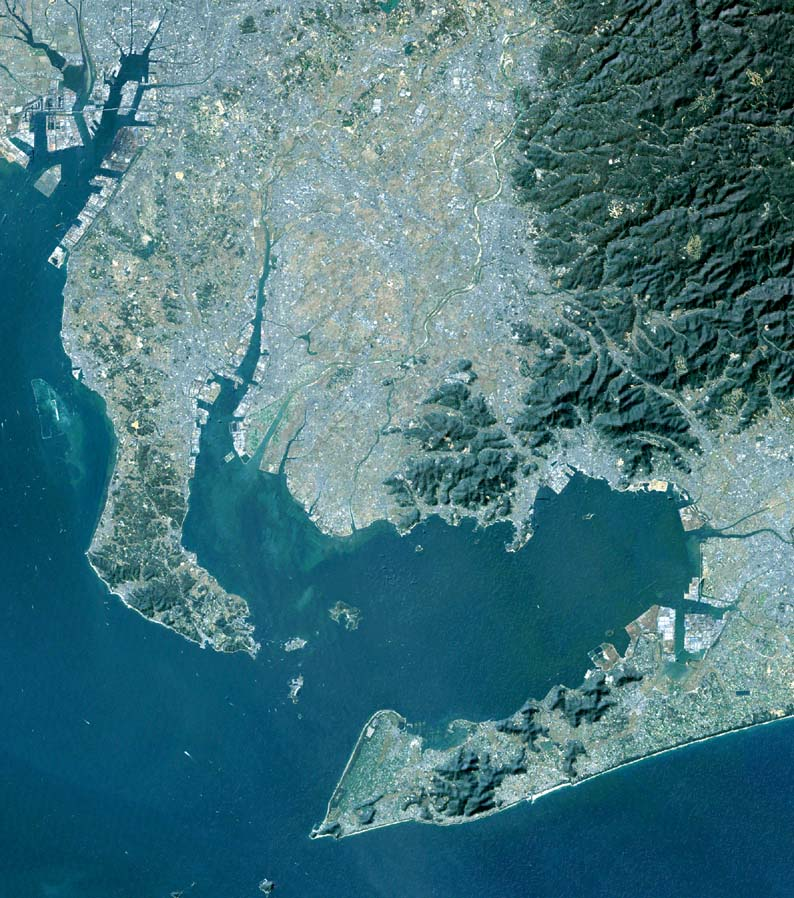
- Mikawa Bay (Landsat photo)

- Location within Aichi Prefecture
- Location: Aichi Prefecture
- Coordinates: 34°46′N 137°05′E
- Ocean/sea sources: Pacific Ocean
- Basin countries: Japan

Mikawa Bay (三河湾 Mikawa-wan) is a bay to the south of Aichi Prefecture, Japan, surrounded by Chita Peninsula to the west and Atsumi Peninsula to the east and south. Its area is approximately 604 km^{2}. Pollution of the shallow, enclosed waters of the bay has become a concern in recent years.

== Islands ==
- Shinojima ja:篠島
- Himakajima ja:日間賀島
- Sakushima ja:佐久島
- Tsukumijima
- Nezujima
- Takeshima ja:竹島 (愛知県)
- Kajishima ja:梶島
- Butsu
- Mikawa Oshima ja:三河大島
- Mikawa Kojima
- Maeshima ja:前島 (愛知県)
- Okishima ja:沖島 (愛知県)
- Himeshima ja:姫島 (愛知県田原市)
- Nojima
