= Mikawa-wan Quasi-National Park =

National park in Honshu, Japan

Mikawa Wan Quasi-National Park
- 三河湾国定公園
- IUCN category V (protected landscape/seascape)
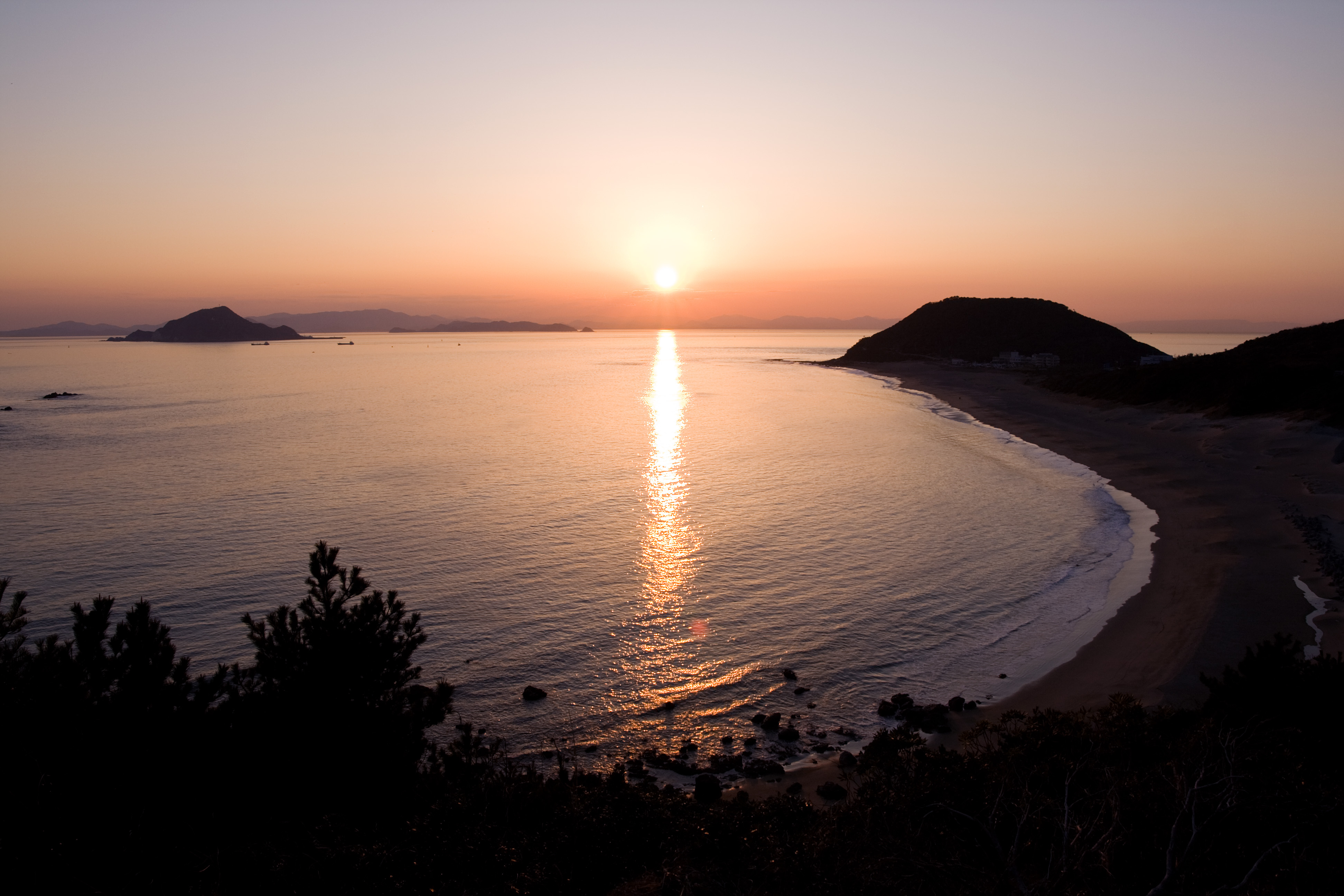
- Cape Irago

- Location within Japan
- Location: Aichi Prefecture, Japan
- Coordinates: 34°36′59″N 137°8′49″E
- Area: 94.43 km^{2} (36.46 sq mi)
- Established: April 10, 1958
- Governing body: Aichi Prefecture

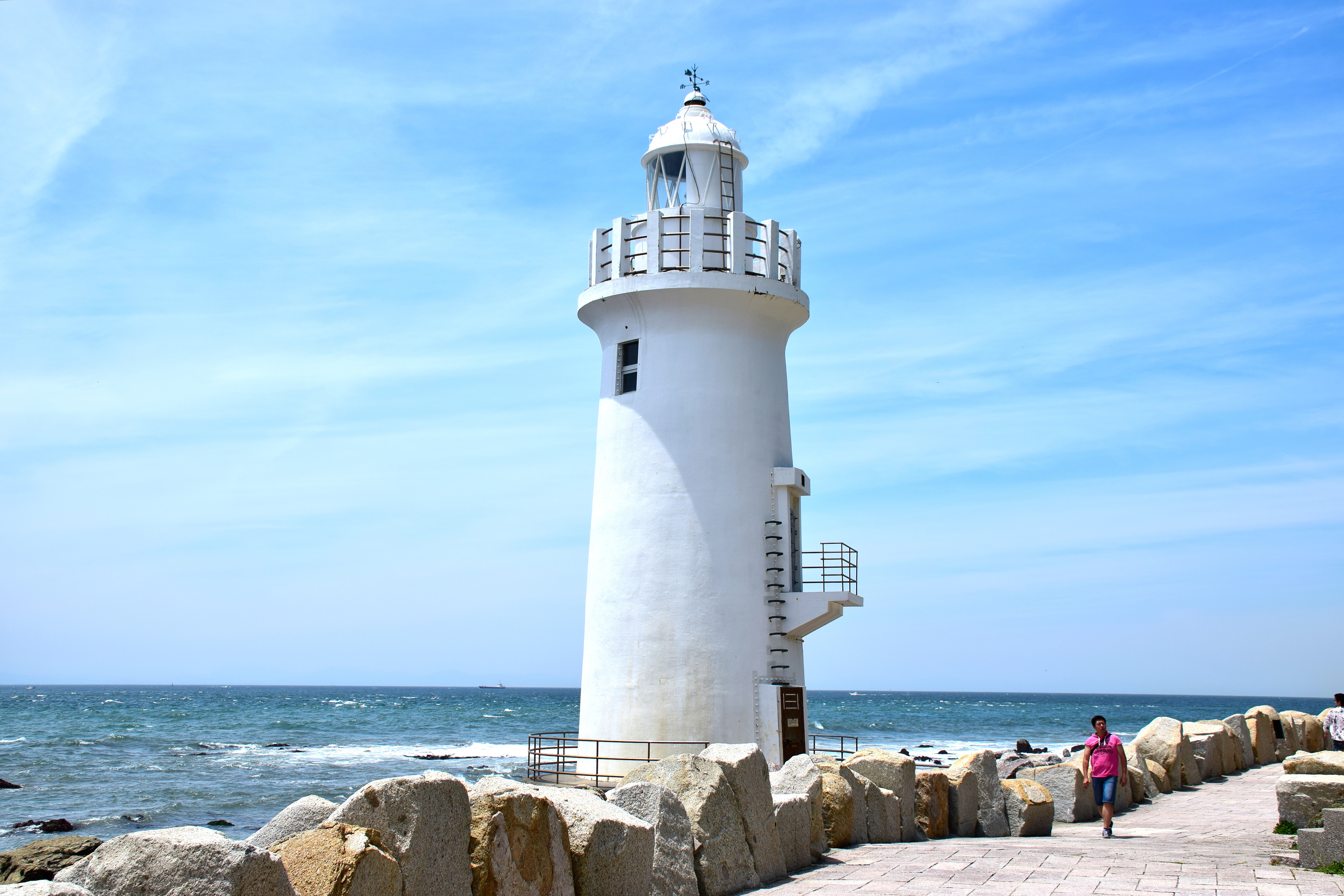
Cape Irago Lighthouse

Mikawa-wan Quasi-National Park (三河湾国定公園, Mikawa-wan Kokutei Kōen) is a quasi-national park in Aichi Prefecture, Japan. It is rated a protected landscape (category V) according to the IUCN. The park includes the coastal areas of the Atsumi Peninsula, the Pacific shoreline of the Chita Peninsula as well as islands and portion of the northern shoreline of Mikawa Bay.

It was founded on 10 April 1958 and has an area of 94.4 km^{2} (36.4 sq mi).

Like all quasi-national parks in Japan, the park is managed by the local prefectural governments.

== See also ==
- List of national parks of Japan
