= Masayo Ōsawa =

Japanese diver

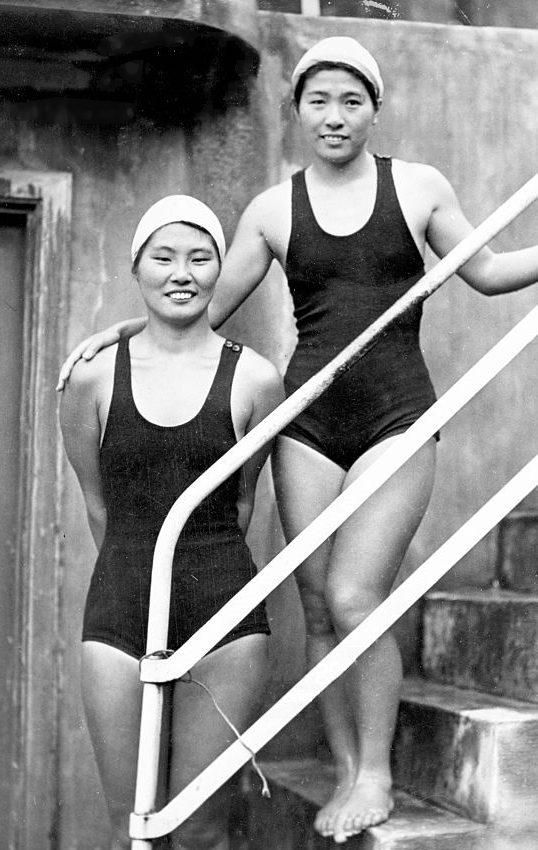
- Reiko Ōsawa and Masayo Ōsawa (right) at the 1936 Olympics

Personal information
- Native name: 大沢 政代
- Born: April 28, 1913 Fukuoka, Japan
- Died: January 1946 (aged 32) Shenyang, China

Sport
- Sport: Diving

Masayo Ōsawa (Japanese: 大沢 政代, Hepburn: Ōsawa Masayo; April 28, 1913 – January 1946) was a Japanese diver. She competed at the 1936 Summer Olympics and finished sixth in the 3 m springboard and 14th in the 10 m platform competition. Her younger sister Reiko Ōsawa also competed at the 1936 Summer Olympics, in the 10 m platform event.

During World War II Ōsawa served in the Japanese Army as a nurse and died of an illness six months after the end of military operations in Northern China.
