= Sujaku Suzuki =

Japanese artist

Olympic medal record

Art competitions
| Bronze medal – third place | 1936 Berlin | Drawings/water colours |

Sujaku Suzuki (鈴木 朱雀, Suzuki Sujaku; December 7, 1891 – May 4, 1972) was a Japanese artist. In 1936 he won a bronze medal in the art competitions of the Olympic Games for his "古典的競馬" ("Classical Horse Racing in Japan").
