= Tsuneo Shibahara =

Japanese diver (born 1917)

Personal information
- Born: January 1, 1917; Tokyo, Japan

Sport
- Sport: Diving

Tsuneo Shibahara (柴原 恒雄, Shibahara Tsuneo, born 1 January 1917, date of death unknown) was a Japanese diver who competed in the 1936 Summer Olympics. In 1936 he finished fourth in the 3 metre springboard event and sixth in the 10 metre platform competition. Shibahara is deceased.
