= Denmark at the 1936 Summer Olympics =

- IOC code: DEN
- NOC: Danish Olympic Committee

in Berlin
- Competitors: 121 in 14 sports
- Flag bearer: Erik Hammer Sørensen
- Medals Ranked 23rd: Gold 0 Silver 2 Bronze 3 Total 5

Summer Olympics appearances (overview)
- 1896; 1900; 1904; 1908; 1912; 1920; 1924; 1928; 1932; 1936; 1948; 1952; 1956; 1960; 1964; 1968; 1972; 1976; 1980; 1984; 1988; 1992; 1996; 2000; 2004; 2008; 2012; 2016; 2020; 2024

Other related appearances
- 1906 Intercalated Games

Denmark competed at the 1936 Summer Olympics in Berlin, Germany. 121 competitors, 105 men and 16 women, took part in 71 events in 14 sports.

== Medalists ==
Medal	Name	Sport	Event	Date
Silver	Ragnhild Hveger	Swimming	Women's 400m freestyle	15 August
Silver	Harry Larsen; Richard Olsen	Rowing	Men's coxless pair	14 August
Bronze	Gerhard Pedersen	Boxing	Men's welterweight	15 August
Bronze	Hans Lunding	Equestrian	Three day event – Individual	16 August
Bronze	Inge Sørensen	Swimming	Women's 200m breaststroke	11 August

== Aquatics ==
=== Diving ===
Women

Athlete	Event	Final	
Athlete	Event	Points	Rank
Mette Gregaard	10m platform	27.54	15
Karen Margrete Andersen	10m platform	27.08	17

=== Swimming ===
Men

Ranks given are within the heat.

Athlete	Event	Heat		Semifinal		Final	
Athlete	Event	Time	Rank	Time	Rank	Time	Rank
John Christensen	100 m freestyle	1:01.1	2 Q	1:01.6	8	Did not advance	
Poul Petersen	100 m freestyle	1:01.6	5	Did not advance			
Aage Hellstrøm	400 m freestyle	5:18.2	3	Did not advance			
Jørgen Jørgensen	400 m freestyle	5:17.8	5	Did not advance			
Poul Petersen	400 m freestyle	5:20.3	4	Did not advance			
Aage Hellstrøm	1500 m freestyle	21:16.9	6	Did not advance			
Jørgen Jørgensen	1500 m freestyle	21:42.0	3 Q	21:46.3	7	Did not advance	
Børge Bæth	100 m backstroke	1:17.3	5	Did not advance			
Finn Jensen	200 m breaststroke	2:55.7	3 Q	2:54.8	7	Did not advance	
Hans Malmstrøm	200 m breaststroke	2:56.5	4	Did not advance			
Erik Skou	200 m breaststroke	2:57.6	4	Did not advance			
Poul Petersen; Jørgen Jørgensen; Aage Hellstrøm; John Christensen	4 × 200 m freestyle relay	—N/a		9:39.6	4	Did not advance	

Women

Ranks given are within the heat.

Athlete	Event	Heat		Semifinal		Final	
Athlete	Event	Time	Rank	Time	Rank	Time	Rank
Eva Arndt	100 m freestyle	1:10.1	5	Did not advance			
Ragnhild Hveger	100 m freestyle	1:09.6	1 Q	1:14.0	8	Did not advance	
Elvi Svendsen	100 m freestyle	1:10.3	4	Did not advance			
Inger Carlsen	400 m freestyle	5:57.1	1 Q	5:55.0	7	Did not advance	
Grete Frederiksen	400 m freestyle	5:39.5	1 Q	5:42.5	3 Q	5:45.0	7
Ragnhild Hveger	400 m freestyle	5:28.0 OR	1 Q	5:33.7	1 Q	5:27.5	2nd place, silver medalist(s)
Tove Bruunstrøm	100 m backstroke	1:20.4	2 Q	1:19.1	3	1:20.4	5
Tove Nielsen	100 m backstroke	1:25.3	4 Q	1:22.0	6	Did not advance	
Valborg Christensen	200 m breaststroke	3:07.8	2 Q	3:14.1	5	Did not advance	
Edel Nielsen	200 m breaststroke	3:21.3	4	Did not advance			
Inge Sørensen	200 m breaststroke	3:06.7	1 Q	3:06.0	2 Q	3:07.8	3rd place, bronze medalist(s)
Ragnhild Hveger; Tove Bruunstrøm; Elvi Svendsen; Eva Arndt	4 × 100 m freestyle relay	—N/a		4:46.2	3 Q	4:51.4	7

== Boxing ==
Men's flyweight

- Kaj Frederiksen (=9th)

Men's bantamweight

- Viggo Frederiksen (=17th)

Men's featherweight

- Sigfred Madsen (=9th)

Men's lightweight

- Poul Kops (4th)

Men's welterweight

- Gerhard Pedersen Bronze

Men's middleweight

- Gunnar Andreasen (=9th)

Men's light heavyweight

- Børge Holm (=5th)

Men's heavyweight

- Omar Hermansen (=9th)

== Cycling ==
Eleven cyclists, all men, represented Denmark in 1936.

Individual road race

- Frode Sørensen
- Arne Petersen
- Knud Jacobsen
- Tage Møller

Team road race

- Frode Sørensen
- Arne Petersen
- Knud Jacobsen
- Tage Møller

Sprint

- Karl Magnussen

Time trial

- Arne Pedersen

Tandem

- Heino Dissing
- Bjørn Stiler

Team pursuit

- Karl Magnussen
- Erik Friis
- Helge Jacobsen
- Hans Christian Nielsen
- Arne Pedersen

== Equestrian ==
- Hans Lunding
- Niels Erik Leschly
- Peter Jensen
- Vincens Grandjean

== Fencing ==
Nine fencers, six men and three women, represented Denmark in 1936.

Men's foil

- Aage Leidersdorff
- Svend Jacobsen
- Caspar Schrøder

Men's team foil

- Erik Hammer Sørensen, Kim Bærentzen, Aage Leidersdorff, Caspar Schrøder, Svend Jacobsen

Men's épée

- Preben Christiansen
- Erik Hammer Sørensen
- Aage Leidersdorff

Men's team épée

- Erik Hammer Sørensen, Caspar Schrøder, Aage Leidersdorff, Preben Christiansen

Men's sabre

- Aage Leidersdorff
- Preben Christiansen
- Erik Hammer Sørensen

Men's team sabre

- Erik Hammer Sørensen, Preben Christiansen, Aage Leidersdorff, Svend Jacobsen

Women's foil

- Karen Lachmann
- Grete Olsen
- Ulla Barding-Poulsen

== Rowing ==
Denmark had 16 rowers participate in five out of seven rowing events in 1936.

Men's coxless pair

- Richard Olsen
- Harry Larsen

Men's coxed pair

- Remond Larsen
- Carl Berner
- Aage Jensen (cox)

Men's coxless four

- Knud Olsen
- Keld Karise
- Bjørner Drøger
- Emil Boje Jensen

Men's coxed four

- Hans Mikkelsen
- Gunnar Ibsen Sørensen
- Flemming Jensen
- Svend Aage Holm Sørensen
- Aage Jensen (cox)

Men's eight

- Remond Larsen
- Olaf Klitgaard Poulsen
- Poul Byrge Poulsen
- Keld Karise
- Bjørner Drøger
- Carl Berner
- Knud Olsen
- Emil Boje Jensen
- Harry Gregersen (cox)

== Shooting ==
Six shooters represented Denmark in 1936.

25 m rapid fire pistol

- Erik Sætter-Lassen
- Axel Lerche
- Christen Møller

50 m pistol

- Julius Lehrmann
- Christen Møller

50 m rifle, prone

- Vilhelm Johansen
- Erik Sætter-Lassen
- Julius Hansen
