= Iris Cummings =

American swimmer and aviator (1920–2025)

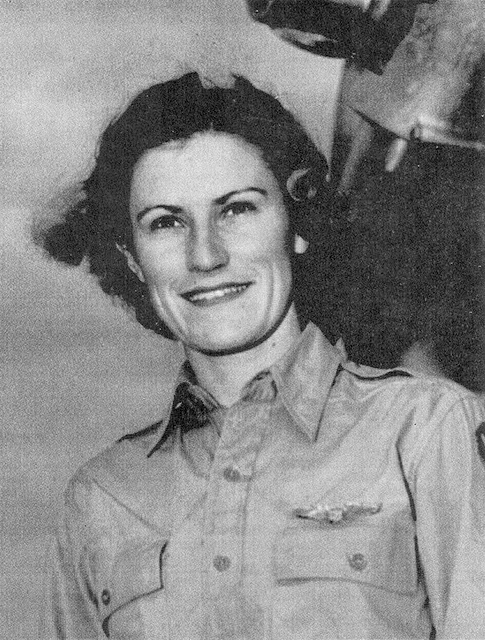
- Cummings c. 1944, in flight uniform

Personal information
- Other names: Iris Cummings Critchell
- Born: December 21, 1920 Los Angeles, California, U.S.
- Died: January 24, 2025 (aged 104) Claremont, California, U.S.
- Education: U. Southern California Pilot Training
- Occupations: Competitive swimmer, Aviator; Aviation instructor Director, Bates Aeronautics Program
- Height: 5 ft 4.5 in (164 cm)
- Spouse: Howard Critchell (m. 1944; died 2015)
- Children: 2

Sport
- Sport: Swimming
- Event: 100, 200, 220 Breaststroke
- Club: Los Angeles Athletic Club
- Coached by: Ray Daughters ('36 Olympics)

Iris Cummings (December 21, 1920 – January 24, 2025), also known by her married name Iris Critchell, was an American aviator and competition swimmer who represented the United States at the 1936 Summer Olympics in Berlin, Germany in the 200-meter breaststroke . After an active athletic career in swimming, which included a reign as U.S. national 200-meter breaststroke champion from 1936 to 1939, she was accepted into the University of Southern California's first Civilian Pilot Training Program in 1939. After graduation, she worked as a flight instructor prior to being selected to serve her country during World War II as a member of the Women's Auxiliary Ferrying Squadron (WAFS) and Women Airforce Service Pilots (WASPs). Following the conflict, she returned to California, where she developed and taught a curriculum on civilian flight for veterans returning from the war at the University of Southern California.

After racing aeroplanes competitively during the 1950s, Cummings and her husband Howard Critchell founded the Bates Aeronautics program at Harvey Mudd College in 1962. They ran it together until he retired in 1979, at which point she continued alone until the program's end in 1990. A long-time certified FAA Pilot Examiner, she was the recipient of several international aviation awards and was a member of the National Flight Instructors Hall of Fame. In her later years, she remained active as a lecturer, consultant, and curator of the Aeronautical Library Special Collections at Harvey Mudd.

== Early life and athletic career ==
Cummings was born in Los Angeles on December 21, 1920, and attended Redondo Union High School. Her father possessed a Doctor of Medicine from Tufts University School of Medicine and also worked as an athletics coach at the start of the 20th century at Columbia University and as the athletic director at Swarthmore College from 1902 through 1908. Her mother was a Greek and Latin teacher. Iris attended the 1932 Summer Olympics as a spectator and began competing in swimming the following year, winning numerous local and regional tournaments. When it was too cold to swim, she remained athletically active through cycling. While she was not a member of any club during her first year of competition, she placed first in several meets in addition to her participation at the 1933 Southern Pacific Amateur Athletic Union and Pacific Coast championships.

Cummings joined the Los Angeles Athletic Club (LAAC) in 1934 and received her first financial support in 1935, helping her attend that year's Far Western Championships.

== 1936 Berlin Olympics ==
Coach Ray Daughters, '29

She captured the American national 200-meter breaststroke championship in 1936, which led to her participation in that year's Olympic trials and her selection as a member of the United States delegation to the 1936 Summer Olympics in Berlin. She was required, however, to raise her own funds for travel to the Games and spent much of her time leading up to the tournament collecting money rather than training. A lack of focused pre-race preparation for the Olympics, may have affected the U.S. women's performance that year. Cummings sailed for Berlin with the U.S. team aboard the SS Manhattan, landing first in Hamburg, Germany.

At the 1936 Olympics, and possibly during some of her late training for the team, she was managed by women's Olympic Head Coach Ray Daughters who had a long career coaching at Seattle's Crystal Pool Swim Club, and then Seattle's Washington Athletic Club. In the women's 200-meter breaststroke, she placed fourth in her heat in the third preliminary round with a time of 3:21.9 and did not progress to the semi-finals, finishing 18th overall. In the Olympic finals, Hideko Maehata of Japan, a strong pre-games favorite, won the 200 breaststroke event with a time of 3:03.6, Martha Genenger of Germany won the silver with a time of 3:04.2, and Inge Sørensen of Sweden, only 12 years old at the time of the race, took the bronze with a time of 3:07.8. Maehata and Geninger were locked in a close race throughout the first 150 meters of the final heat. With her 3:21.9, Cummings was well out of metal contention, though she had the second fastest time of any American who completed the event, with Dorothy Schiller Cummings placing 14th.

Despite her performance in the Olympics, she remained as national champion in the 200-meter breaststroke event through 1939, although she left the LAAC in 1937. She placed second at the 1939 National Championships and retired from active competition shortly after, deciding that the 1940 Summer Olympics were unlikely to occur. In 1941, she earned a degree in physical sciences and math from the University of Southern California.

== World War II ==
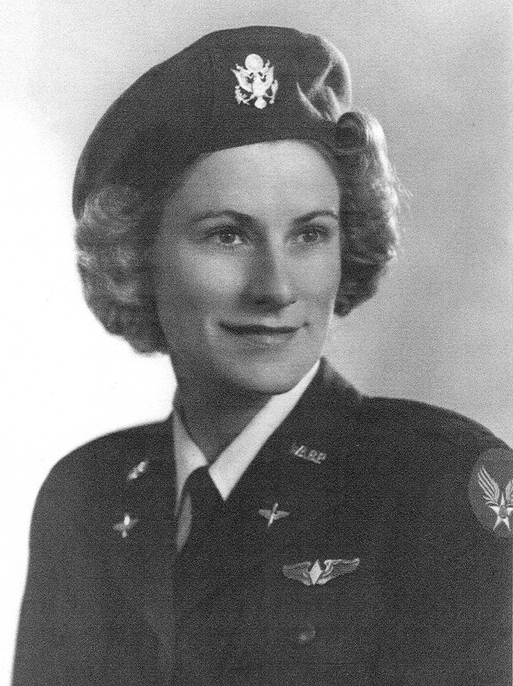
Cummings in 1944

Cummings was among the first people accepted into USC's Civilian Pilot Training Program in 1939. She completed an advanced aerobatics course and earned her pilot's licence in 1940 and, by her 1941 graduation, had acquired enough training to begin work as an instructor. Upon completing a contract as flight instructor for the Navy Cadet Training Program. She worked for Long Beach's 6th Ferrying Group, piloting nearly 20 types of military aircraft eventually reaching the rank of First Lieutenant. Cummings joined the Women's Auxiliary Ferrying Squadron in December 1942, which later, in August 1943, became part of the Women Airforce Service Pilots (WASP). She served in World War II until the organization's deactivation on December 20, 1944. During this time, she was a civilian member of the 6th Ferrying Group, Air Transport Command, Ferrying Division and flew military aircraft including the P-38, as well as the P-51 and P-61 (Black Widow). Following her unit's deactivation, she married military pilot Howard Critchell, whom she had met at a base that was used as a ferry stop for the WAFS and WASPs. They had two children, and remained married for more than 70 years until his death in 2015.

== Later life and death ==
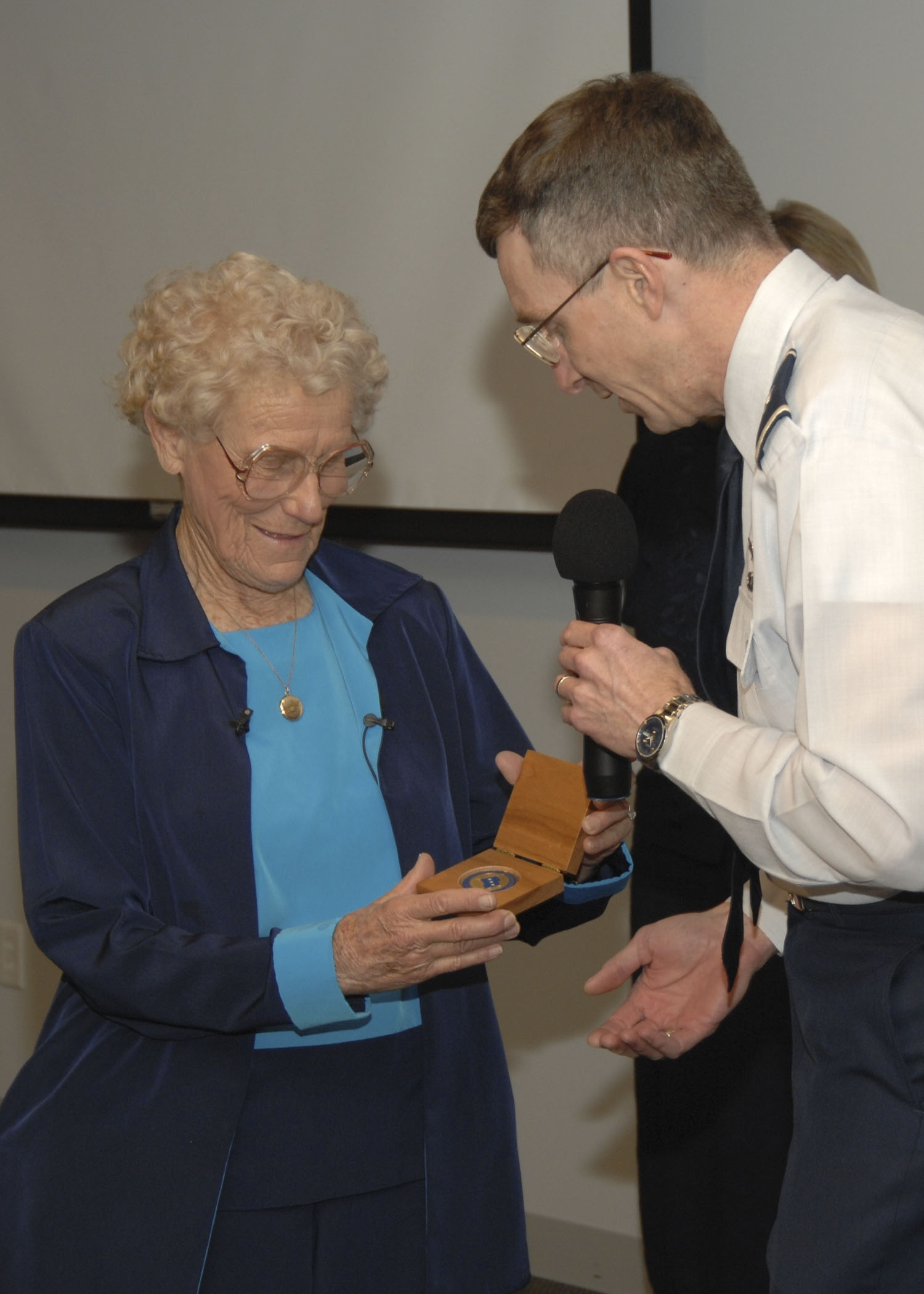
Critchell receives a Space and Missile Systems Center (SMC) coin from SMC Vice Commander, Brigadier General Neil McCasland, March 28, 2007

=== Teaching and competing ===
Following the war, Cummings was called back to USC to develop and teach a curriculum on civilian aviation for returning veterans. She remained active as a flight instructor, as well as helping develop curricula for Federal Aviation Administration institutions. She also raced airplanes competitively during this period and won the 1957 All Woman Transcontinental Air Race, capturing the first prize pot of $800 (approximately $7,735 in 2021 terms). In 1962, she joined Harvey Mudd College and, in association with the Bates Foundation, founded the school's Bates Aeronautics Program. She ran the program with her husband until he retired in 1979, and continued alone until the program ended with her 1990 retirement. She continued teaching classes on aeronautics, however, until 1996. Her students include astronauts George Nelson and Stanley G. Love. She also served as an FAA Pilot Examiner for over two decades and was named the organization's Flight Instructor of the Year for the Ontario district in 1972.

After her official retirement, she remained active on several faculty projects at Harvey Mudd College, in addition to working as a lecturer, consultant, and curator of the Aeronautical Library Special Collections at the college's Sprague Library. She had been a member of the Ninety-Nines, an organization dedicated to the support of women pilots, since 1952.

=== Honors ===
Cummings was inducted into the National Flight Instructors Hall of Fame in 2000. She was awarded the Federal Aviation Administration's Wright Brothers Master Pilot Award in 2006 for her dedication to airplane safety and the Nile Gold Medal of the Fédération Aéronautique Internationale in 2007 for her lifetime of dedication to aviation education. In an activity, in which she gained recognition, beginning in 1992, she was a highly visible member of the 99s, an organization that supported female pilots

She died in Claremont, California, on January 24, 2025, at the age of 104. At the time of her death, Cummings was the last-known surviving participant of the 1936 Olympics and pre-war Olympics.
