= Maehata =

Maehata (written: 前畑 or 前端) is a Japanese surname. Notable people with the surname include:

- Maehata Gaho (前端 雅峯), Japanese lacquer artist
- Hideko Maehata (前畑 秀子, 1914–1995), Japanese swimmer
- Yoshiyasu Maehata, researcher

== See also ==
- 9870 Maehata, main-belt asteroid
