= Swimming at the 1936 Summer Olympics – Women's 200 metre breaststroke =

Women's 200 metre breaststroke at the Games of the XI Olympiad
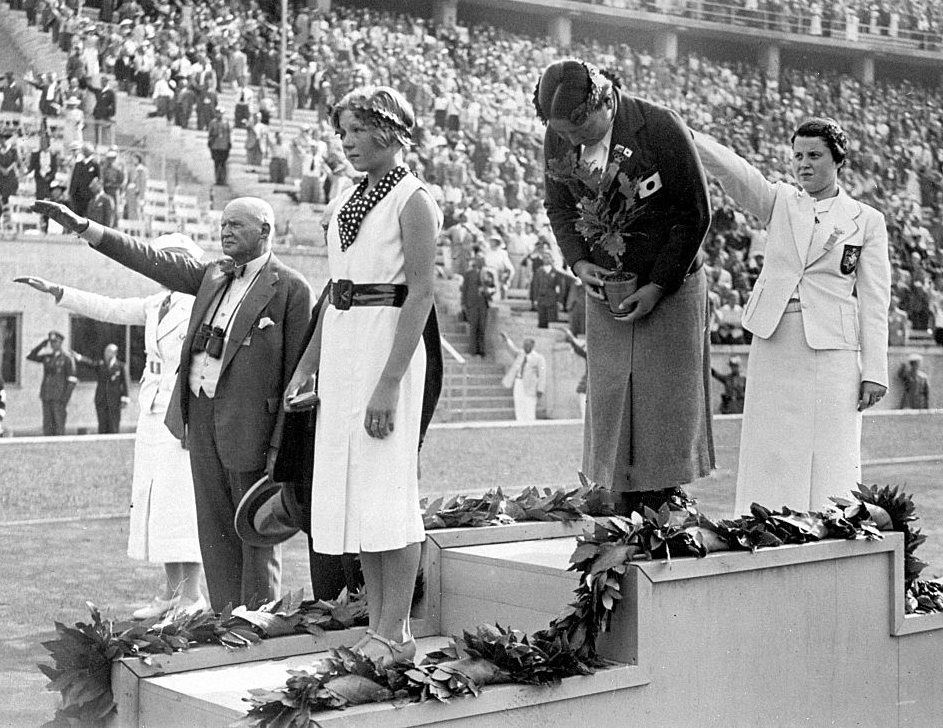
- Victory ceremony
- Venue: Olympiapark Schwimmstadion Berlin
- Date: 8 August (heats); 9 August (semifinals); 11 August (final)
- Competitors: 23 from 12 nations
- Winning time: 3:03.6

Medalists
1st place, gold medalist(s)		Hideko Maehata	Japan
2nd place, silver medalist(s)		Martha Genenger	Germany
3rd place, bronze medalist(s)		Inge Sørensen	Denmark

The women's 200 metre breaststroke event at the 1936 Summer Olympics, took place from 8 to 11 August, at the (50 m) Olympiapark Schwimmstadion Berlin. It was the fourth appearance of the event, which first appeared at the 1924 Summer Olympics in Paris. A total of 23 competitors from 12 nations participated in the event.

The world record holder at the time, Japanese Hideko Maehata, won the event four years after losing the gold medal to Australian Clare Dennis by one tenth of a second. Twenty four-year-old German silver medalist Martha Genenger broke the Olympic record in her heat on 8 August, but Maebata broke it again in the next heat with a time of 3:01.9 seconds. Danish Inge Sørensen won the bronze medal, becoming the youngest ever female Olympic medalist (12 years, 24 days). Sørensen's compatriot Valborg Christensen was favoured to win a medal in this event, but she was eliminated after finishing fifth in her semifinal.

== Records ==
Prior to this competition, the existing world and Olympic records were:

World record	Hideko Maehata (JPN)	3:00.4 min	Tokyo, Japan	30 September 1933
Olympic record	Clare Dennis (AUS)	3:06.3 min	Los Angeles, United States	9 August 1932

The following records were established during the competition:

Date	Round	Name	Nationality	Time	OR	WR
8 August	Heat 2	Martha Genenger	Germany	3:02.9	OR	
8 August	Heat 3	Hideko Maehata	Japan	3:01.9	OR	

== Results ==
=== Heats ===
The three fastest swimmers of each heat and the next two fastest swimmers overall (Hanni Hölzner and Dorothy Schiller) advanced to the semifinals on 9 August.

==== Heat 1 ====
Rank	Name	Nationality	Time	Notes
1	Inge Sørensen	Denmark	3:06.7	Q
2	Kerstin Isberg	Sweden	3:08.7	Q
3	Jopie Waalberg	Netherlands	3:10.4	Q
4	Hanni Hölzner	Germany	3:11.0	q
5	Dorothy Schiller	United States	3:17.4	q
6	Vera Kingston	Great Britain	3:21.7	
7	Joan Langdon	Canada	3:24.3	

==== Heat 2 ====
Rank	Name	Nationality	Time	Notes
1	Martha Genenger	Germany	3:02.9	Q, OR
2	Jenny Kastein	Netherlands	3:07.8	Q
3	Unoko Tsuboi	Japan	3:15.0	Q
4	Anja Lappalainen	Finland	3:19.1	
5	Ann Govednik	United States	3:25.3	

==== Heat 3 ====
Rank	Name	Nationality	Time	Notes
1	Hideko Maehata	Japan	3:01.9	Q, OR
2	Valborg Christensen	Denmark	3:07.8	Q
3	Margaret Gomm	Great Britain	3:15.7	Q
4	Iris Cummings	United States	3:21.9	
5	Eliška Boubelová	Czechoslovakia	3:25.8	
6	Tenny Wyss	Switzerland	3:31.3	

==== Heat 4 ====
Rank	Name	Nationality	Time	Notes
1	Trude Wollschläger	Germany	3:08.5	Q
2	Doris Storey	Great Britain	3:10.8	Q
3	Maria Lenk	Brazil	3:17.2	Q
4	Edel Nielsen	Denmark	3:21.3	
5	Jo Stroomberg	Netherlands	3:22.5	

=== Semifinals ===
The three fastest swimmers of both semifinals and the best fourth-place finisher advanced to the final on 11 August.

==== Semifinal 1 ====
Rank	Name	Nationality	Time	Notes
1	Hideko Maehata	Japan	3:03.1	Q
2	Inge Sørensen	Denmark	3:06.0	Q
3	Hanni Hölzner	Germany	3:08.8	Q
4	Jopie Waalberg	Netherlands	3:09.7	Q
5	Trude Wollschläger	Germany	3:10.3	
6	Margaret Gomm	Great Britain	3:15.8	
7	Maria Lenk	Brazil	3:17.7	

==== Semifinal 2 ====
Rank	Name	Nationality	Time	Notes
1	Martha Genenger	Germany	3:02.8	Q
2	Jenny Kastein	Netherlands	3:09.2	Q
3	Doris Storey	Great Britain	3:09.8	Q
4	Kerstin Isberg	Sweden	3:11.4	
5	Valborg Christensen	Denmark	3:14.1	
6	Unoko Tsuboi	Japan	3:18.4	
7	Dorothy Schiller	United States	3:18.5	

=== Final ===
Rank	Name	Nationality	Time	Notes
1st place, gold medalist(s)	Hideko Maehata	Japan	3:03.6	
2nd place, silver medalist(s)	Martha Genenger	Germany	3:04.2	
3rd place, bronze medalist(s)	Inge Sørensen	Denmark	3:07.8	
4	Hanni Hölzner	Germany	3:09.5	
4	Jopie Waalberg	Netherlands	3:09.5	
6	Doris Storey	Great Britain	3:09.7	
7	Jenny Kastein	Netherlands	3:12.8	
