= Győrffy =

Győrffy is a surname. Notable people with the surname include:

- Balázs Győrffy, Hungarian, American, and British theoretical physicist
- Balázs Győrffy (politician), Hungarian politician
- Dóra Győrffy (born 1978), Hungarian high jumper
- Imre Győrffy (1905–1980), Hungarian cyclist
- Irén Győrffy (1920–1950), Hungarian swimmer
- Sándor Győrffy (born 1966), Hungarian handball player
