= Poul Petersen =

Poul Petersen may refer to:

- Poul Petersen (footballer) (1921–1997), Danish footballer and Olympic bronze medalist (1960)
- Poul Petersen (swimmer) (1912–1959), Danish swimmer
- Poul Erik Petersen (1927–1992), Danish Olympic footballer (1952)
- Poul Petersen (actor) (1905–1986), Danish actor and theater director, in Affæren Birte
- Poul Petersen (badminton), Danish badminton player
- PVP Karting, a racing kart manufacturer founded and run by Poul V Petersen

== See also ==
- Poul Pedersen (1932–2017), Danish footballer and Olympic silver medalist (1948)
- Poul Pedersen (cinematographer) (1925-2003), American cinematographer for Danish films
