= Jopie Waalberg =

Dutch swimmer (1920–1979)

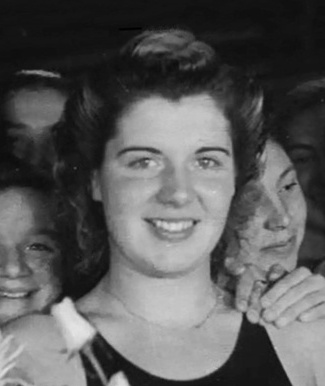
- Jopie Waalberg in 1940

Personal information
- Born: 13 April 1920 Amsterdam, the Netherlands
- Died: 5 July 1979 (aged 59) Enkhuizen, the Netherlands

Sport
- Sport: Swimming
- Club: ADZ
Medal record
Representing the Netherlands
European Championships
Bronze medal – third place	1938 London	200 m breaststroke

Johanna Maria Elisabeth "Jopie" Waalberg (13 April 1920 – 5 July 1979) was a Dutch breaststroke swimmer who competed in the 1936 Summer Olympics and was the first woman to swim the 200 meter breaststroke under 3 minutes.

In 1936, she finished fifth in the 200 metre breaststroke event, the single breaststroke event until the 1968 Olympics. At the 1938 European Aquatics Championships in London she won a bronze medal on the same distance.

On 11 May 1937, she broke Hideko Maehata's four-year-old breaststroke record by 0.2 seconds (3:00.2). On 27 June of that year, in Zaandijk, she improved on that record by more than 2 seconds to 2:58.0. She improved her own world record once more on 2 October to 2:56.9. She further held world records in the unconventional distances of 200 yard, 400 m and 500 m breaststroke.

Records
Preceded by (Japan) Hideko Maehata	Women's 200 m breaststroke world record holder 11 May 1937 – 8 Nov 1939	Succeeded by (Brazil) Maria Lenk
