= Tove Nielsen =

Tove Nielsen may refer to:

- Tove Søby, née Nielsen, Danish sprint canoeist
- Tove Nielsen (swimmer), Danish swimmer
- Tove Nielsen (politician), Danish politician
