= Rørvig =

- Town
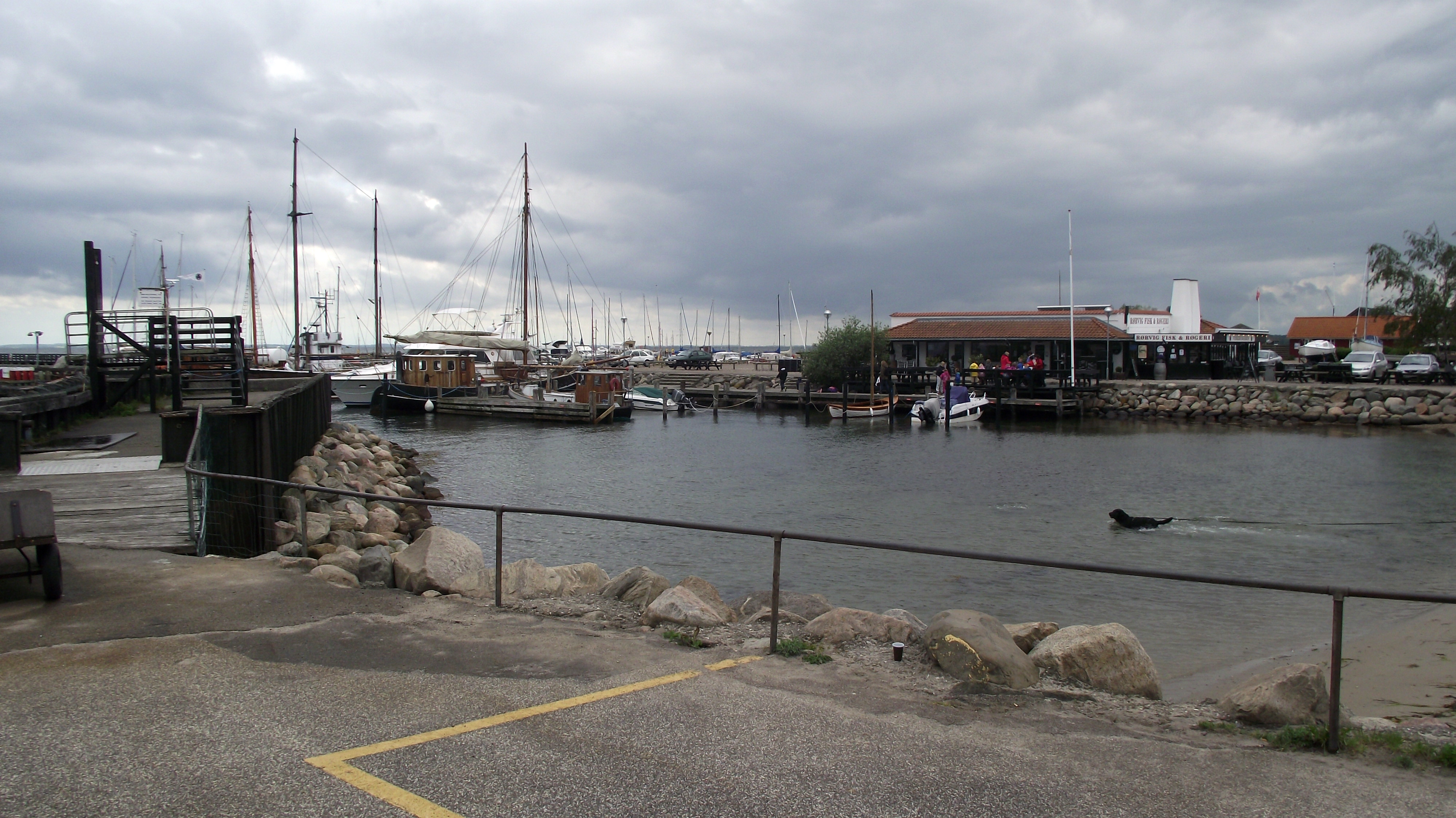
- Rørvig harbour

- Location in Region Zealand Rørvig (Denmark)
- Coordinates: 55°56′35″N 11°45′05″E
- Country: Denmark
- Region: Region Zealand
- Municipality: Odsherred

Area
  - Urban: 1.13 km^{2} (0.44 sq mi)

Population (2026)
  - Urban: 996
  - Urban density: 881/km^{2} (2,280/sq mi)
- Time zone: UTC+1 (CET)
  - Summer (DST): UTC+2 (CEST)
- Postal code: DK-4581 Rørvig

Rørvig is a small town with a population of 996 (1 January 2026) in the northern part of the island of Zealand (Sjælland) in eastern Denmark.

== Geography ==
Rørvig is surrounded by water on three sides: to the north is the Kattegat, to the east is the channel leading into Roskilde Fjord, and to the south is the Isefjord. There is a small fishing industry there, as well as a marina for pleasure craft. The pier is excellent for crabbing (take a peg, a long piece of string and a bucket; the local fish shop usually has old fish heads for bait!). A short distance from Rørvig is a site that is in the centre of Denmark. The centre of Denmark is marked with a big stone.

Rørvig is located a few kilometres from Nykøbing Sjælland.

The famous Solvognen chariot from the Nordic Bronze Age has been on display at a museum in Rørvig since it was found in the bogs.

== Wildlife ==
A popular trip is walking from Rørvig to Kattegat since there is a lot of wildlife and plant life on the way. There are many species in Rørvig since there are few cars and people. It is not uncommon to see deer and hares, this is why some people like hunting in these areas. There are also many birds but most of them are common types, like magpies, thrushes, sparrows, blue tits, great tits, blackbirds, Herring gulls, and hooded gulls. Of the more rare birds are geese, grouse, and some other types of thrushes. Snails, slugs wasps and just about all other common insects are found in Rørvig.

== Ferry ==
The Hundested-Rørvig vehicle ferry runs regularly between Rørvig and the small town of Hundested.

== Notable people ==
- Poul Petersen (1912 in Rørvig – 1959) a Danish swimmer, competed at the 1936 Summer Olympics
- Morten Rutkjær (born 1974 in Rørvig) a Danish former football player and currently the assistant manager of B.93
