= Anni Stolte =

German swimmer (1915–1994)

Personal information
- Born: 24 February 1915 Düsseldorf, Germany
- Died: 18 April 1994 (aged 79) Düsseldorf, Germany

Sport
- Sport: Swimming

Anni Stolte (24 February 1915 – 18 April 1994) was a German swimmer. She competed in the women's 100 metre backstroke at the 1936 Summer Olympics.
