= Tenny Wyss =

Swiss swimmer

Personal information
- Full name: Elisabeth Hedwig Wyss
- Born: 10 April 1916 Basel, Switzerland
- Died: 28 March 2001 (aged 84) Basel, Switzerland

Sport
- Sport: Swimming
- Strokes: Breaststroke

Tenny Wyss (10 April 1916 – 28 March 2001) was a Swiss swimmer. She competed in the women's 200 metre breaststroke at the 1936 Summer Olympics.
