= Swimming at the 1932 Summer Olympics – Women's 200 metre breaststroke =

Women's 200 metre breaststroke at the Games of the X Olympiad
- Venue: LA84 Foundation/John C. Argue Swim Stadium
- Date: August 7, 1932 (heats); August 9, 1932 (final)
- Competitors: 11 from 7 nations
- Winning time: 3:06.3 OR

Medalists
1st place, gold medalist(s)		Clare Dennis	Australia
2nd place, silver medalist(s)		Hideko Maehata	Japan
3rd place, bronze medalist(s)		Else Jacobsen	Denmark

The women's 200 metre breaststroke was a swimming event held as part of the swimming at the 1932 Summer Olympics programme. It was the third appearance of the event, which was established in 1924. The competition was held on Sunday, August 7, 1932 and on Tuesday, August 9, 1932.

Eleven swimmers from seven nations competed.

== Records ==
These were the standing world and Olympic records (in minutes) prior to the 1932 Summer Olympics.

World record	3:03.4	(Denmark) Else Jacobsen	Stockholm (SWE)	11 May 1932
Olympic record	3:11.2	(Germany) Hilde Schrader	Amsterdam (NED)	8 August 1928

In the first semi-final Clare Dennis set a new Olympic record with 3:08.2 minutes. In the final she bettered this record with 3:06.3 minutes.

== Results ==
=== Round One ===
Sunday, August 7, 1932: The fastest two in each semi-final and the fastest third-placed from across the semi-finals advanced to the final.

Heat 1

Place	Swimmer	Time	Qual.
1	Clare Dennis (AUS)	3:08.2	QQ OR
2	Margaret Hoffman (USA)	3:14.7	QQ
3	Dorothy Prior (CAN)	3:33.2	

Heat 2

Place	Swimmer	Time	Qual.
1	Else Jacobsen (DEN)	3:12.1	QQ
2	Ann Govednik (USA)	3:15.9	QQ
3	Cecelia Wolstenholme (GBR)	3:24.5	
4	Janet Sheather (CAN)	3:46.1	

Heat 3

Place	Swimmer	Time	Qual.
1	Hideko Maehata (JPN)	3:10.7	QQ
2	Margery Hinton (GBR)	3:13.5	QQ
3	Jane Cadwell (USA)	3:20.0	QQ
4	Maria Lenk (BRA)	3:26.6	

=== Final ===
Tuesday 9 August 1932:

Place	Swimmer	Time
1	Clare Dennis (AUS)	3:06.3 OR
2	Hideko Maehata (JPN)	3:06.4
3	Else Jacobsen (DEN)	3:07.1
4	Margery Hinton (GBR)	3:11.7
5	Margaret Hoffman (USA)	3:11.8
6	Ann Govednik (USA)	3:16.0
7	Jane Cadwell (USA)	3:18.2
