= Swimming at the 1936 Summer Olympics – Women's 100 metre backstroke =

Women's 100 metre backstroke at the Games of the XI Olympiad
- Venue: Olympiapark Schwimmstadion Berlin
- Date: 11 August 1936 (heats); 12 August 1936 (semifinals); 13 August 1936 (final)
- Competitors: 21 from 12 nations
- Winning time: 1:18.9

Medalists
1st place, gold medalist(s)		Nida Senff	Netherlands
2nd place, silver medalist(s)		Rie Mastenbroek	Netherlands
3rd place, bronze medalist(s)		Alice Bridges	United States

The women's 100 metre backstroke was a swimming event held as part of the swimming at the 1936 Summer Olympics programme. It was the fourth appearance of the event, which was established in 1924. The competition was held from Tuesday to Thursday, 11 to 13 August 1936.

Twenty-one swimmers from 14 nations competed.

Famous swimmer Eleanor Holm was suspended by Avery Brundage over "a drinking episode" while she was traveling to Germany together with other American athletes. She had swum in the 1928 and 1932 Olympics, winning gold in 1932. Holm's Olympic teammates unsuccessfully petitioned to have her dismissal overturned. She was the top favorite for the 100-meter backstroke event, and watched from the stands as the gold medal went to Dutch swimmer Nida Senff. Decades later, Holm told Olympic sprinter Dave Sime that Brundage held a grudge from an incident in which he propositioned her, and she turned him down. Brundage was one of the most controversial figures in the US Olympic history, known for his racist and sexist remarks and actions and also for appeasing dictatorships, such as Nazi Germany and the Soviet Union.

== Records ==
These were the standing world and Olympic records (in minutes) prior to the 1936 Summer Olympics.

World record	1:15.8	(Netherlands) Rie Mastenbroek	Amsterdam (NED)	27 February 1936
Olympic record	1:18.3	(United States) Eleanor Holm	Los Angeles (USA)	9 August 1932

Nida Senff set a new Olympic record in the first heat with 1:16.2 minutes.

== Results ==
=== Heats ===
Thursday 11 August 1936: The fastest four in each heat advanced to the semi-finals.

Heat 1

Place	Swimmer	Time	Qual.
1	Nida Senff (NED)	1:16.6	QQ OR
2	Tove Bruunstrøm (DEN)	1:20.4	QQ
3	Lorna Frampton (GBR)	1:20.9	QQ
4	Anni Stolte (GER)	1:23.1	QQ
5	Kitty Mackay (AUS)	1:24.6	
6	Irén Győrffy (HUN)	1:25.8	
7	Noel Oxenbury (CAN)	1:28.9	
8	Sieglinda Zigler (BRA)	1:32.0	

Heat 2

Place	Swimmer	Time	Qual.
1	Alice Bridges (USA)	1:19.2	QQ
2	Truus Kerkmeester (NED)	1:21.2	QQ
3	Phyllis Harding (GBR)	1:22.1	QQ
4	Pat Norton (AUS)	1:22.3	QQ
5	Christel Rupke (GER)	1:23.7	
6	Thérèse Blondeau (FRA)	1:23.8	
7	Roma Wagner (AUT)	1:28.4	

Heat 3

Place	Swimmer	Time	Qual.
1	Edith Motridge (USA)	1:21.0	QQ
2	Rie Mastenbroek (NED)	1:22.0	QQ
3	Audrey Hancock (GBR)	1:23.6	QQ
4	Tove Nielsen (DEN)	1:25.3	QQ
5	Mary McConkey (CAN)	1:25.3	
6	Yeung Sauking (ROC)	1:36.4	

=== Semifinals ===
Wednesday 12 August 1936: The fastest three in each semi-final and the fastest fourth-placed advanced to the final.

Semifinal 1

Place	Swimmer	Time	Qual.
1	Nida Senff (NED)	1:17.1	QQ
2	Edith Motridge (USA)	1:19.1	QQ
3	Tove Bruunstrøm (DEN)	1:19.1	QQ
4	Phyllis Harding (GBR)	1:19.8	qq
5	Anni Stolte (GER)	1:21.7	
6	Pat Norton (AUS)	1:21.9	

Semifinal 2

Place	Swimmer	Time	Qual.
1	Rie Mastenbroek (NED)	1:19.1	QQ
2	Lorna Frampton (GBR)	1:19.6	QQ
3	Alice Bridges (USA)	1:20.4	QQ
4	Truus Kerkmeester (NED)	1:21.3	
5	Audrey Hancock (GBR)	1:21.6	
6	Tove Nielsen (DEN)	1:22.0	

=== Final ===
Thursday 13 August 1936:

Place	Swimmer	Time
1	Nida Senff (NED)	1:18.9
2	Rie Mastenbroek (NED)	1:19.2
3	Alice Bridges (USA)	1:19.4
4	Edith Motridge (USA)	1:19.6
5	Tove Bruunstrøm (DEN)	1:20.4
6	Lorna Frampton (GBR)	1:20.6
7	Phyllis Harding (GBR)	1:21.5
