= Nida Senff =

Dutch swimmer (1920–1995)

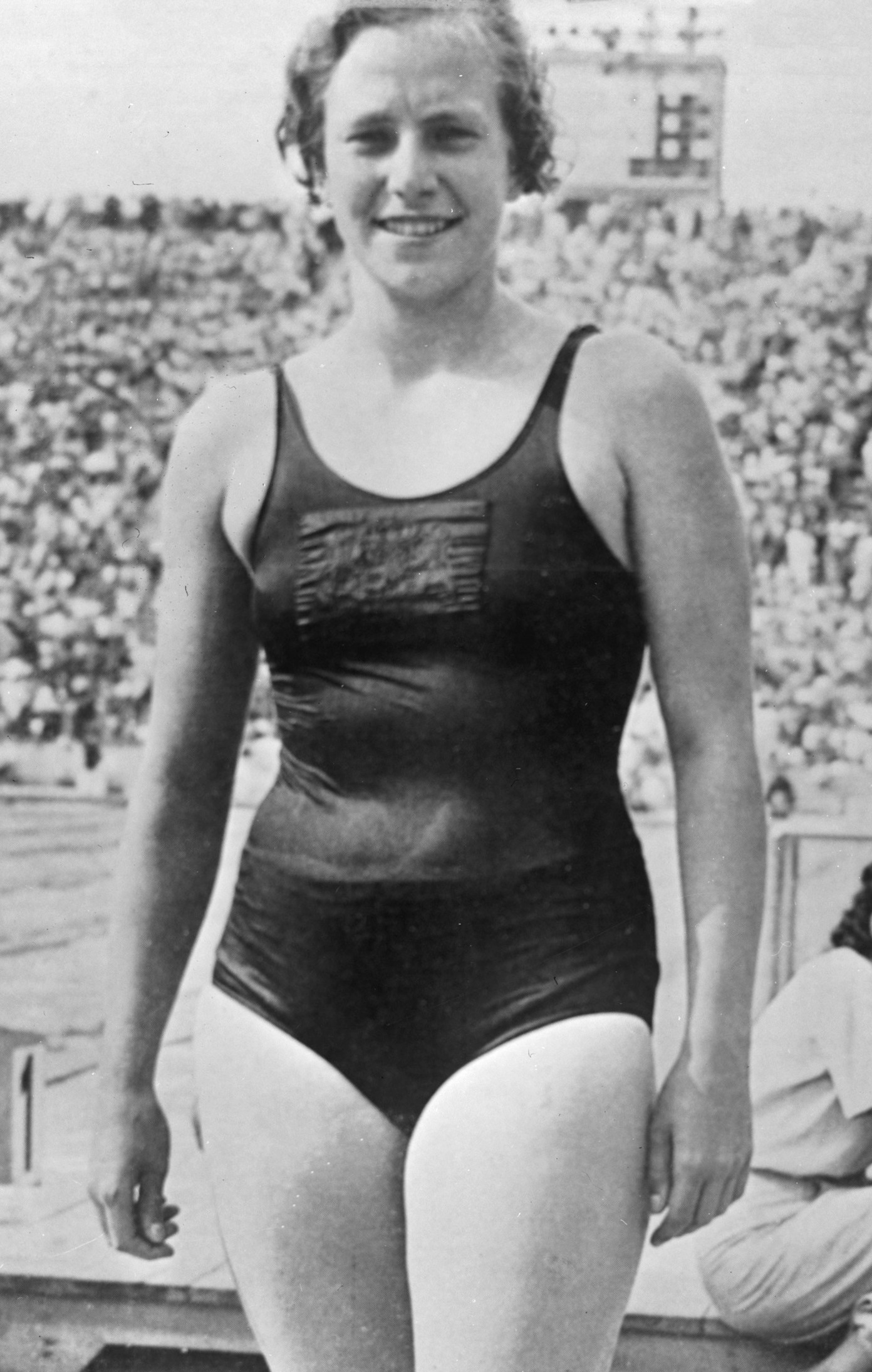

Personal information
- Full name: Dina Willemina Jacoba Senff
- Nickname: Nida
- National team: Netherlands
- Born: 3 April 1920 Rotterdam, Netherlands
- Died: 27 June 1995 (aged 75) Amstelveen, Netherlands

Sport
- Sport: Swimming
- Strokes: Backstroke
Medal record
Women's swimming
Representing the Netherlands
Olympic Games
Gold medal – first place	1936 Berlin	100 m backstroke

Dina Willemina Jacoba "Nida" Senff (3 April 1920 – 27 June 1995) was a backstroke swimmer from the Netherlands who won the 100 metres backstroke at the 1936 Summer Olympics in Berlin. She did so after missing a turning point, went back to push the wall, and still won the race. Senff won the Dutch title in the 100 metres backstroke in 1935 and 1937, and set five world records in 100 m, 150 yd and 200 m backstroke in 1936–1937. In 1983, she was inducted to the International Swimming Hall of Fame.

== See also ==
- List of members of the International Swimming Hall of Fame
