= Alice Bridges =

American swimmer (1916–2011)

Personal information
- Full name: Alice W. Bridges
- National team: United States
- Born: July 19, 1916 Waterville, Maine, U.S.
- Died: May 5, 2011 (aged 94) Carlisle, Pennsylvania, U.S.

Sport
- Sport: Swimming
- Strokes: Backstroke
Medal record
Women's swimming
Representing the United States
Olympic Games
Bronze medal – third place	1936 Berlin	100 m backstroke

Alice W. Bridges (July 19, 1916 – May 5, 2011), also known by her married name Alice Roche, was an American competition swimmer, who at age 20, represented the United States at the 1936 Summer Olympics in Berlin, Germany.

== Biography ==
Mumford River Falls (as seen from the Alice Bridges Bridge

Bridges grew up in Uxbridge, Massachusetts. She and her twin sister learned to swim in a pond in Uxbridge; Alice then later trained at the Olympic pool in nearby Whitinsville, Massachusetts.

At the age of twenty, she was chosen to represent the United States at the 1936 Summer Olympics in Berlin, Germany. When the sudden chance arose for her to participate, residents of her hometown raised funds to pay for her travel to Berlin, which she otherwise could not have afforded.

Immediately following her Olympic meet, it appeared that Bridges, who originally was a back-up contestant, had actually won her event. Several hours later, however, the judges reversed their decision, and awarded the gold and silver medals to two women from the Netherlands, leaving the bronze for Bridges.

== Alice Bridges Bridge ==
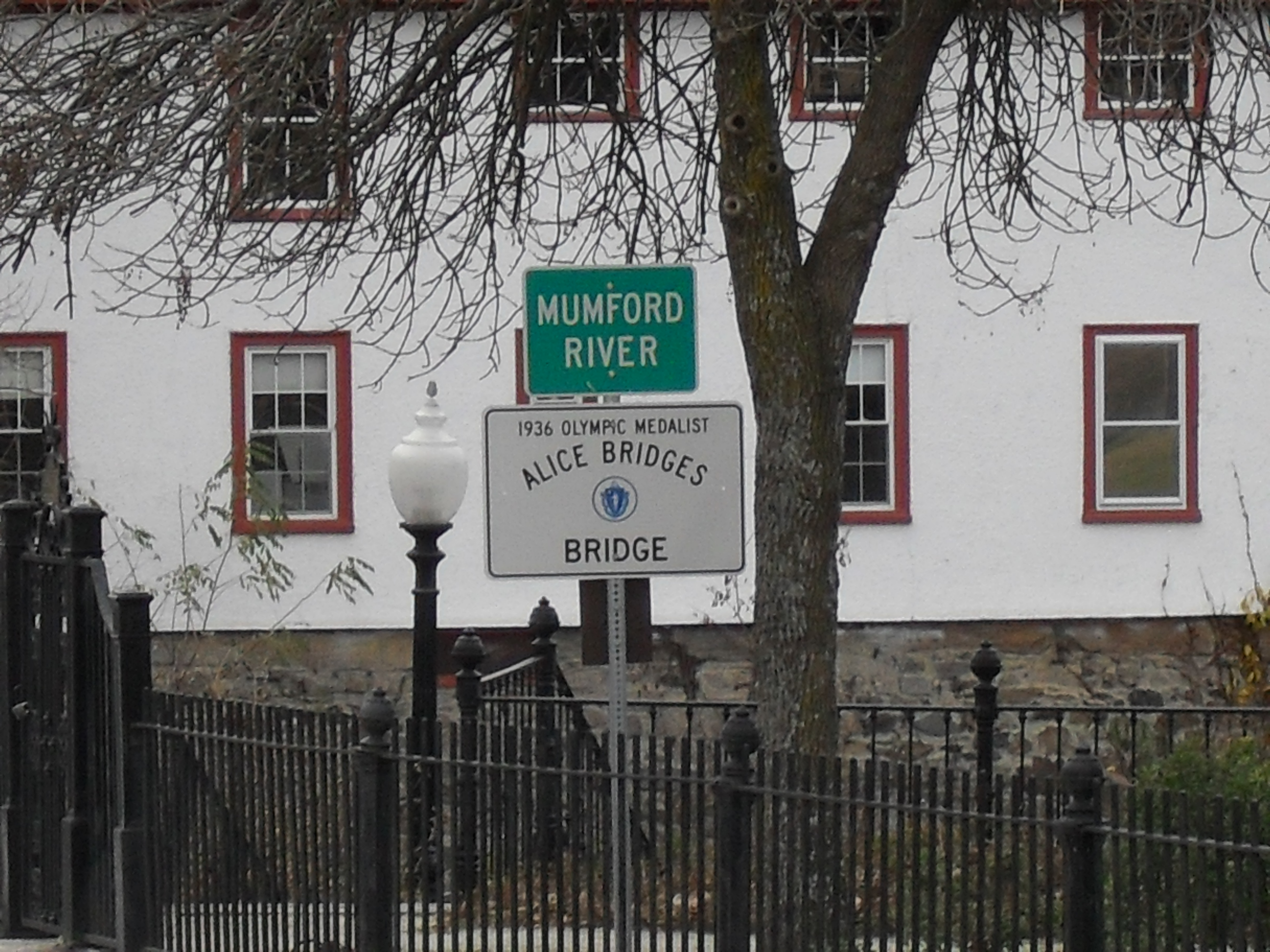
1936 Olympic Swimmer, Alice Bridge's, "Sign", on Mumford River Bridge, with Colonel Seth Read's 1777 Grist Mill in Background, downtown Uxbridge, Massachusetts

In 2008, the State of Massachusetts, and local officials named the downtown Mumford River bridge in Uxbridge, in Bridges' honor, in her 92nd year. Until her death, she resided in Carlisle, Pennsylvania.

== See also ==
- List of Olympic medalists in swimming (women)
