= Edith Motridge =

American swimmer (1913–2007)

- Motridge in 1936

Personal information
- Full name: Edith Segal Motridge
- National team: United States
- Born: July 30, 1913 San Francisco, California, US
- Died: November 1, 2007 (aged 94) Fairbanks Ranch, California, US

Sport
- Sport: Swimming
- Strokes: Backstroke
- Club: Los Angeles Athletic Club

Edith Segal Motridge (July 30, 1913 – November 1, 2007), also known by her married name Edith Polster or as Edith Motridge Segal, was an American competitive swimmer who represented the United States in the 1936 Summer Olympics in Berlin, Germany, coming fourth in the women's 100-meter backstroke. After her competitive swimming career, she became Esther Williams' stand-in when filming Metro-Goldwyn-Mayer movies, although she also had minor roles in films such as Cynthia (1946) and The Cobweb (1955).

After Motridge's swimming and film career, she was involved in philanthropic efforts with her husband, including a Boys & Girls Clubs of San Dieguito Foundation scholarship. She died in Fairbanks Ranch in 2007.

== Early life ==
Motridge was born in San Francisco on July 30, 1913, later attending Hollywood High School and the University of Southern California. Due to Hollywood High School not having a girls' swim team, she trained with the boys' team, and later with the Los Angeles Athletic Club.

== Career ==
=== Competitive swimming ===
At the 1936 Summer Olympics, Motridge placed fourth in the women's 100-meter backstroke with a time of 1:19.6. She was also the US champion in the 100m backstroke in 1939 with a time of 1:18.9. Along with Esther Williams, she set the national record in either the 300m or 300-yard medley in 1939. (Note: Some sources state 300 yards, others state 300 meters.)

=== Film ===
After her competitive swimming career, Motridge worked on movies at Metro-Goldwyn-Mayer (MGM) as Esther Williams' stunt double and stand-in. She worked on all swimming films made by MGM. Motridge later appeared in other films without Williams, such as in 1945 in Without Love. She went on to play a role in The Harvey Girls in 1946, then played a teacher in the 1947 film Cynthia. She played a nurse in 1955's The Cobweb. In 1956, she had an acting role in The Swan.

== Personal life ==
In 1969, Motridge married Leonard Polster. They moved to Fairbanks Ranch in 1983. They had three children and four grandchildren. Throughout their partnership they were involved in philanthropic efforts, including a Boys & Girls Clubs of San Dieguito Foundation scholarship started in the late 1980s which was reported in 1999 to give $25,000–$30,000 scholarships to students in North County, California.

Motridge died on November 1, 2007, at her home in Fairbanks Ranch.
