= Ann Govednik =

American swimmer (1916–1985)

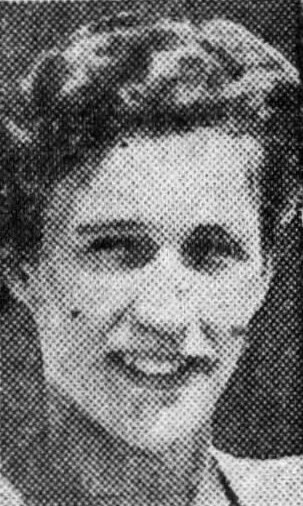
- Govednik in 1932

Personal information
- Full name: Ann Barbara Govednik
- National team: United States
- Born: July 21, 1916 Chisholm, Minnesota, U.S.
- Died: August 6, 1985 (aged 69) Duluth, Minnesota, U.S.
- Education: St. Cloud State University; Phys. Ed. 1939
- Height: 163 cm (5 ft 4 in)
- Weight: 45 kg (99 lb)
- Spouse: Wheeler Van Steinberg (m. 1941)

Sport
- Sport: Swimming
- Strokes: Breaststroke
- Coach: Helen Manson (Chisholm High School); Aileen Allen ('32 Olympics); Ray Daughters ('36 Olympics)

Ann Barbara Govednik (July 21, 1916 – August 6, 1985), also known by her married name Ann Van Steinburg, was an American competition swimmer who represented the United States at the 1932 Los Angeles and 1936 Berlin Olympics. A graduate of St. Cloud State University, in 1932 she set an unofficial world record in the 100-yard breaststroke of 1:18. After retiring as an elite competitive swimmer, she had a career of over twenty years teaching swimming and physical education at the University of Minnesota Duluth, and Duluth's Washington Junior High School.

== Early life ==
Ann Govednik was born in Chisholm, Minnesota to Mr. and Mrs. Martin Govednik on July 21, 1916. At the age of 11, she was pushed into a pool, apparently almost drowning before her sister Mary came to her rescue. From that point on, she worked to become a proficient swimmer. She attended Chisholm High School where beginning at the age of fourteen, she competed with the girl's varsity team coached by Helen Manson. In May 1932, she held the world record in the 100-yard breaststroke, completing the distance in a time of 1:18, breaking a sixteen year standing record.

== Olympics ==
Olympic Coach Ray Daughters

As a 16-year-old at the 1932 Olympics in Los Angeles, she finished sixth in the finals of the women's 200-meter breaststroke. Claire Dennis of Australia took the gold medal. Though nearly disqualified for wearing an "inappropriate suit" that showed too much of her shoulders, Dennis brought home the gold for Australia finishing .1 second ahead of Hideko Maehata of Japan who swam a 3:06.4 for the bronze. Danish swimmer Else Jacobsen took the bronze with a time of 3:07.1. At the 1932 Olympics, Govednik was managed by Head U.S. Olympic swim coach Ray Daughters, team manager Charlotte Epstein, and Olympic women's Head Coach Aileen Allen.

After the 1932 Olympics, upon her return from Los Angeles, the city of Chisholm, who had helped fund her trip to the Olympics, celebrated her return in a parade with over 5000 people in attendance.

Four years later, at the 1936 Olympics in Berlin, Germany, Govednik was eliminated in the first round of the 200-meter breaststroke after swimming a 3:25.3, where she was again coached by Ray Daughters. Hideko Maehata took the gold medal for Japan, Martha Genenger took the silver for Germany, and Inge Sorensen took the bronze for Denmark. Daughters, an International Swimming Hall of Fame honoree, was a former swimming champion, and a long serving coach of the strong swimming program at Seattle's Washington Athletic Club.

=== St. Cloud State University ===
In 1934, Govednik captured the American title in the 200 breaststroke. She attended St. Cloud State University from 1934-1939, where she majored in physical education, though the school did not have a women's swim team at the time.

=== Marriage ===
Govednik was married to Wheeler Van Steinberg on September 27, 1941 in St. Cloud, Minnesota. Van Steinberg was a proficient swimmer, a former lifeguard on the St. Cloud waterfront, and served as a swimming instructor for the Eight Army Special Services in Japan from 1943-1946. He was appointed First Aid Water Safety and Accident Prevention Representative for North and South Dakota in October, 1946. Both he and Govednik were teaching graduates of St. Cloud State.

=== Careers ===
Upon college graduation, she taught swimming at the University of Minnesota Duluth. In later years, she became the physical education instructor at Washington Junior High School in Duluth, Minnesota through a seventeen year career, before a 1975 retirement.

At the age of 69, Govednik died of cancer on August 6, 1985 in Duluth, Minnesota.

== Legacy ==
She was honored by her home town of Chisholm, Minnesota with the renaming of the junior high swimming pool in her honor, as well as declaring the 27 March 1974 as "Ann Govednik Day". She was inducted into the St. Cloud State University athletic hall of fame in 1984, and the Duluth Entertainment Convention Center Athletic Hall of Fame in 2008.
