= Anja Lappalainen =

Finnish swimmer

Personal information
- Born: 12 October 1917 Kotka, Grand Duchy of Finland
- Died: 30 September 1987 (aged 69) Lahti, Finland

Sport
- Sport: Swimming

Anja Lappalainen (12 October 1917 – 30 September 1987) was a Finnish swimmer. She competed in the women's 200 metre breaststroke at the 1936 Summer Olympics.
