= Eliška Boubelová =

Czech swimmer (born 1916)

Personal information
- Born: 8 April 1916 Teplice, Austria-Hungary

Sport
- Sport: Swimming

Eliška Boubelová (born 8 April 1916, date of death unknown) was a Czech swimmer. She competed in the women's 200 metre breaststroke at the 1936 Summer Olympics. Boubelová is deceased.
