= Hanni Hölzner =

German swimmer

Personal information
- Born: February 17, 1913
- Died: October 25, 1988 (aged 75)

Sport
- Sport: Swimming
Medal record
Representing Germany
European Championships
Silver medal – second place	1934 Magdeburg	200 m breaststroke

Johanna "Hanni" Hölzner (February 17, 1913 – October 25, 1988) was a German breaststroke swimmer who competed in the 1936 Summer Olympics. In 1936 she finished fourth in the 200 metre breaststroke event.
