= Jane Cadwell =

American swimmer

- Cadwell at 22 posing at her wedding in Detroit, January 1938

Personal information
- Full name: Jane Cadwell
- National team: United States
- Born: February 16, 1915 Detroit, Michigan, U.S.
- Died: April 29, 2000 (aged 85) Algonac, Michigan, U.S.
- Spouse: Thomas Lyman Lott

Sport
- Sport: Swimming
- Strokes: Breaststroke
- Club: Detroit Yacht Club

Marjorie Jane Cadwell (February 16, 1915 – April 29, 2000), also known by her married name Jane Lott, was an American competition swimmer who represented the United States at the 1932 Summer Olympics held in Los Angeles, in the 200-meter breaststroke.

Cadwell was born on February 16, 1915 to Ruel T. and Florence Cadwell in greater Detroit, Michigan.

On August 4, 1928, she won the 55-yard breaststroke in 58 seconds at the Metropolitan Detroit Swimming Championships. At 13, swimming for the Detroit Yacht Club, Cadwell was an AAU champion in the 100-meter breaststroke, and held records in the event in both indoor and outdoor competitions. At 14, on July 30, 1929, Cadwell won the 100-meter breaststroke event at the National Junior AAU Aquatic Championships in a time of 1:38, making her a young national champion.

While swimming for Northwestern School, Caldwell won the 25-yard breaststroke competition at the Chicago City Swimming Meet in late February, 1929, leading Northwestern's team to a second place finish with a record breaking time of 17 seconds against Highland Park High School. In 1930 city-wide competition, Jane set new backstroke record of 50-yard backstroke of 39 seconds, and a new 25-yard backstroke record of 16.4 seconds. In 1932 while competing in her first major national competition, she won the 100-yard breaststroke in the AAU National Indoor Championships, and later broke the world record in the 50-yard breaststroke.

== 1932 Olympics ==
At the 1932 Olympic trials in Long Island, New York in mid-July, Cadwell finished third in the 200-meter breaststroke, in a heat where the top three finishers would qualify for the American Olympic team. Cadwell finished third behind first place Margaret Hoffman of Scranton, and Annie Govednik of Chisholm, Minnesota.

As a 17-year-old, she placed seventh in the August event final of the women's 200-meter breaststroke at the 1932 Los Angeles Olympics, finishing with a time of 3:18.2.

=== Later life ===
Jane attended and graduated New London's Connecticut College for Women in 1936, though she did not swim for the college. She married lawyer Thomas Lyman Lott on January 15, 1938 at Detroit's St. Joseph's Episcopal Church with a reception following at the Detroit Golf Club.

=== Honors ===
Cadwell was inducted into the Connecticut College Athletic Hall of Fame in 2002. In the same year, the Connecticut College Pool was named the Jane Cadwell Lott ’36 Natatorium in her honor.
