= Dorothy Schiller =

American swimmer (1916–1992)

Dorothy Schiller -Green -Haver
- Schiller during her swimming career

Personal information
- Full name: Dorothy Jane Schiller
- National team: United States
- Born: April 20, 1916 Chicago, Illinois, U.S.
- Died: January 1992 (aged 76) Skokie, Illinois, U.S.
- Spouses: Green, Robert L. Haver

Sport
- Sport: Swimming
- Event: 200 breaststroke
- Strokes: Breaststroke
- Club: Lake Shore Athletic Club
- Coach: Stan Brauninger (Lake Shore AC); Ray Daughters (36 Olympics)

Dorothy Jane Schiller (April 20, 1916 – January 1992), also known by her married names, Dorothy Green, and Dorothy Haver, was an American competition swimmer who competed for the Lake Shore Athletic Club and represented the United States in the 200-meter breast stroke at the 1936 Summer Olympics in Berlin.

Schiller was born April 20, 1916, in greater Chicago, Illinois. She may have first begun competing in swimming with the Illinois Women's athletic Club, which folded due to lack of funding during the depression. She progressed as a swimmer largely through her association with the strong program at greater Chicago's Lake Shore Athletic Club where she was coached by ASCA Hall of Fame Coach Stan Brauninger. 1936 Olympic backstroke champion Adolph Kiefer was also a member of the Lake Shore Athletic Club under Brauninger. By December 1933, she was known as a Central American Athletic Union Breaststroke champion. On April 11, 1935, at the National AAU Swimming Championships, though she led through the first two turns, Dorothy placed second to Katherine Rawls who set a record of 1:20.6. Despite finishing second, Schiller defeated the World Record holder Anne Govednik, who placed third in the event.

== 1936 Olympic trials ==
Schiller qualified for the 1936 Olympics by finishing first in the 200-meter breaststroke at the mid-July Olympic trials in Astoria, New York, with a time of 3:14.9, touching a full 1 1/2 lengths ahead of second-place finisher Anne Gevednik of Chisholm, Minnesota, a former record holder in the event. She also won the final of the 400 meter freestyle. The U.S. Olympic team sailed to Hamburg aboard the USS Manhattan, then traveled to Berlin still amid controversy over whether the U.S. team should participate as a result of several U.S. boycotts of the Olympics that year. As a result of limited funding for the U.S. team that year, several members of the women's team did not train with other Olympians prior to the Olympics, which had become standard.

== 1936 Berlin Olympics ==
Coach Ray Daughters, '29

After placing fifth in the first preliminary heat at the August, 1936 Olympic swimming competition with a time of 3:17.4, Schiller advanced to the semifinals of the women's 200-meter breaststroke. In the second of two semi-final rounds, she placed seventh with a time of 3:18.5, ultimately giving her a place of fourteenth overall after the finals were held. At the 1936 Olympics, and possibly during some of her late training for the team, she was managed by women's Olympic Head Coach Ray Daughters who had a long career coaching at Seattle's Crystal Pool, and then Seattle's Washington Athletic Club.

Hideko Maehata of Japan, a strong pre-games favorite, won the finals of the 200 breaststroke event with a time of 3:03.6, Martha Geninger of Germany won the silver with a time of 3:04.2, and Inge Sorensen of Sweden, only 12 years old at the time of the race, took the bronze with a time of 3:07.8. Maehata and Geninger were locked in a close race throughout the first 150 meters of the final heat. With her 3:18.5, Schiller was well out of metal contention, but had the fastest time of any American who completed the event, with Iris Cummings placing 18th.

Schiller had qualified for, and could have been scheduled to also compete in the women's 4x100 freestyle relay in Berlin, but did not participate.

=== Marriages ===
Schiller's first marriage gave her the name Dorothy Green, and after her second marriage to Robert L. Haver, she became Dorothy Haver.

In May 1951, as Dorothy Schiller Green, she participated in a golf tournament for former Olympians at the Northwestern University Golf Club in Willmette, Illinois. In July 1962, as Dorothy Haver, she was named by the mayor's Youth Foundation of Chicago as a vice-president in a committee to help organize and stage the AAU National Swimming Championship and the Men's International Invitational meet, where she served as a vice-president alongside 1936 Olympian Adolph Kiefer. In February 1962, as Dorothy Haver, she was renamed as a treasurer of the Midwest U.S. Olympians.

Dorothy Schiller Haver died around the age of 76 in January, 1992 in Skokie, Illinois. A memorial service was held the morning of January 27, by Haben Funeral Home on Nile Center road in Skokie, and she was buried at St. Paul Cemetery.

=== Honors ===
She was posthumously honored as a member of the Illinois Swimming Hall of Fame, as part of the class of 2020.
