= Christel Rupke =

German swimmer

Personal information
- Born: 7 March 1919 Solingen, Germany
- Died: 16 November 1998 (aged 79) Solingen, Germany

Sport
- Sport: Swimming

Christel Rupke (7 March 1919 – 16 November 1998) was a German swimmer. She competed in the women's 100 metre backstroke at the 1936 Summer Olympics, where she did not advance to the finals.

She was one of the Olympic athletes featured in the "Brennpunkte des Deutschen Sports" card series issued by Muratti Cigarettes.

She retired from swimming in 1938. She lost two husbands during the course of World War II. After the war she worked for the Solingen town hall.
