= Inge Sørensen =

Danish swimmer (1924–2011)

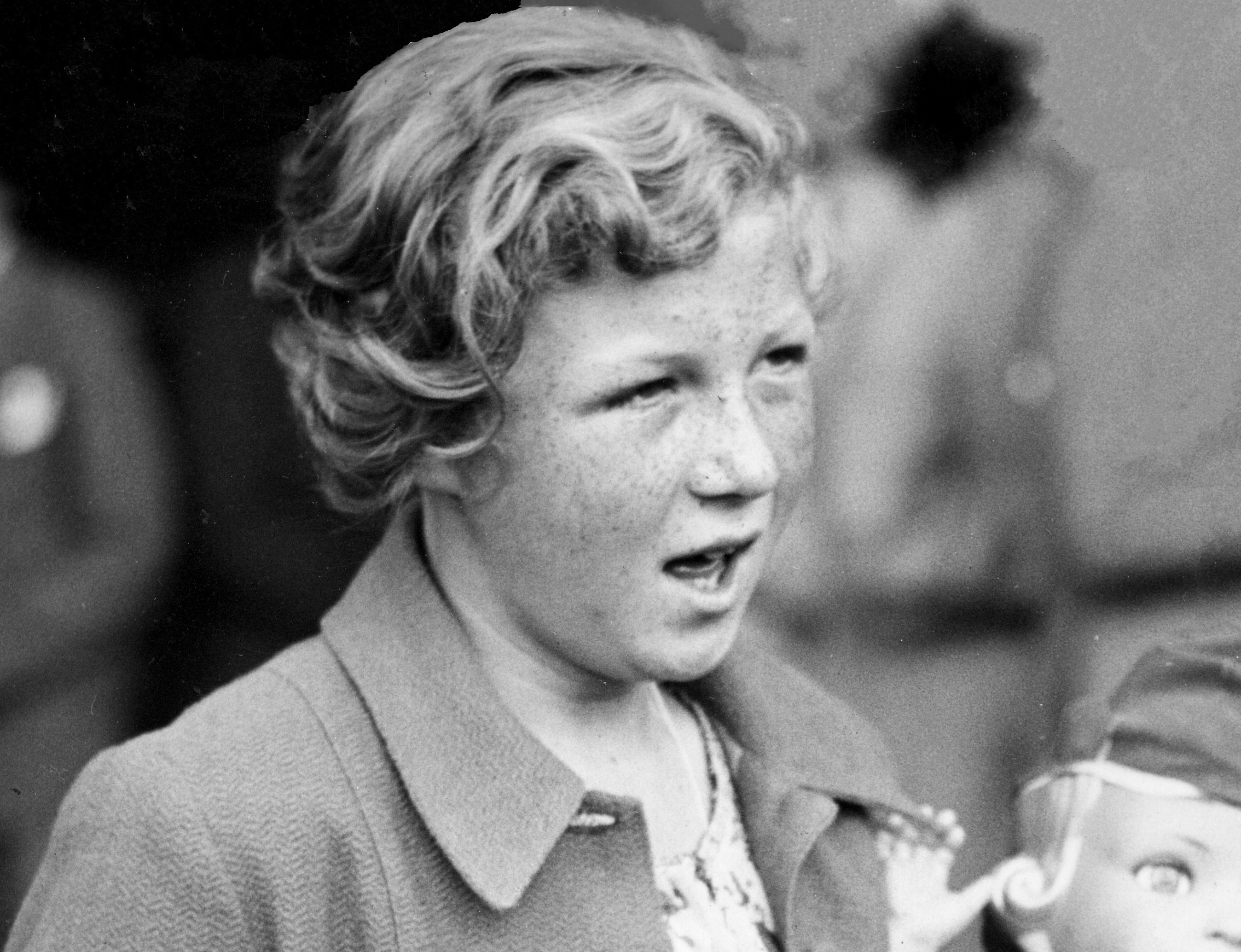
- Inge Sørensen in 1936

Personal information
- Born: 18 July 1924 Skovshoved, Denmark
- Died: 9 March 2011 (age 86) New Jersey, US

Sport
- Sport: Swimming
Medal record
Representing Denmark
Summer Olympics
Bronze medal – third place	1936 Berlin	200m breaststroke
European Championships
Gold medal – first place	1938 London	200 m breaststroke

Inge Sørensen (18 July 1924 – 9 March 2011), later Inge Tabur, sometimes known as "Lille henrivende Inge" ("Little endearing Inge") was a Danish swimmer who at age 12 won a bronze medal in the 200 meter breaststroke at the 1936 Summer Olympics in Berlin. This makes her the youngest Olympic medal winner in an individual competition.

During 1936-1944 she won nine Danish championships, two Nordic championships and one European championship. She set 14 Danish records in breaststroke. She also broke the world record in the 400m and 500m breaststroke and became the first Danish female swimmer to finish in under three minutes in the 200m breaststroke.

Her swimming career was cut short by World War II. After the war she married a Danish engineer and moved abroad, eventually residing in the US.

== Early life ==
Inge Sørensen was born in Skovshoved, Denmark, the daughter of a fishmonger, in 1924. She began swimming at age three in the harbor of Skovshoved north of Copenhagen and won her first Danish championship aged 11 in 1936 in the 200m breaststroke. Because of this, she was selected for the Olympic Games in Berlin the same year.

== Olympic Games in Berlin, 1936 ==
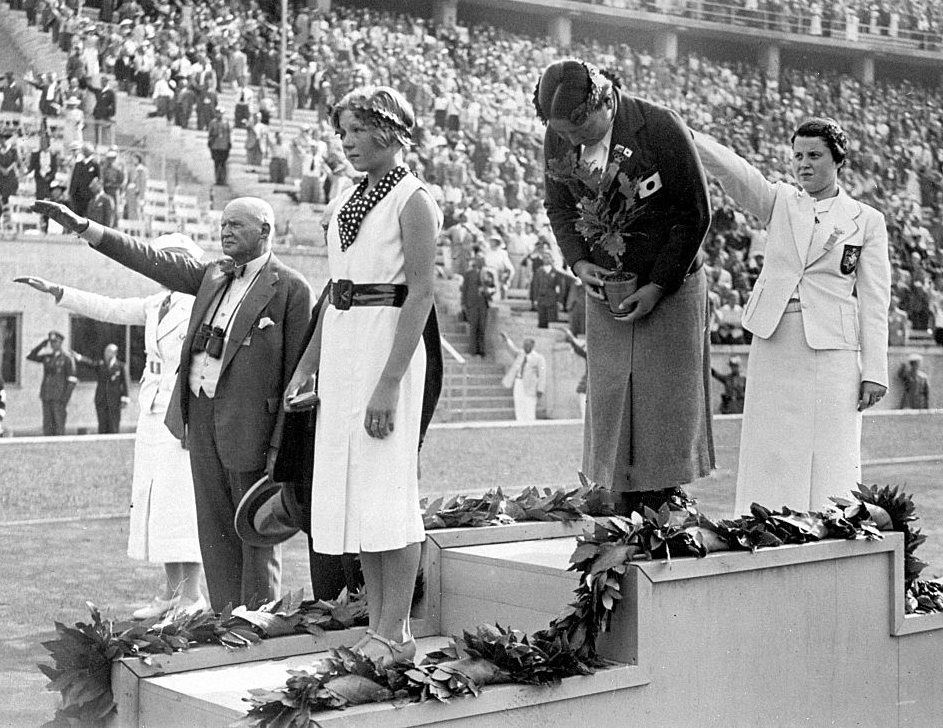
Inge Sørensen (in front) at Olympic Games 1936

At the Olympic Games, aged 12, she won a bronze medal in the 200m breaststroke. (Note: She was one of three Danish female swimmers in this discipline in 1936. Another Danish woman, Else Jacobsen, won bronze on the same distance at the Olympic Games in 1932.) She is the youngest medal winner at the Olympic Games in an individual competition. Her final on 11 August was the first event to be broadcast live on air by Danish radio, which itself was a sensation. During the games she got the nickname Lille henrivende Inge (Little Lovely Inge).

On her return from Berlin she and the other Danish female medal winner, Ragnhild Hveger, received an enthusiastic welcome in Copenhagen. (Note: 30000 people waited for them at the station and blocked all exits so they had to leave along the railroad track. Inge lost her doll, probably the one shown in the photo.)

== European Championships in London, 1938 ==
Between 1936 and 1938 Sørensen improved her times in swimming, despite concerns that puberty would slow her down. At the European championships in swimming in London in 1938, she won a gold medal in the 200m breaststroke.

== World War II ==
The period 1939-1941 was the height of her career. In 1939 she broke the world record in the 400m and 500m breaststroke, and in 1941 she became the first Danish female swimmer to finish in under three minutes in the 200m breaststroke. (Note: Danish female swimmer Rikke Møller Pedersen held the world record in the 200m breaststroke from 2013 till 2021. Time: 2 min 19.11 sec)

Nevertheless, World War II meant that the Summer Olympics in 1940 and 1944 were cancelled with the European Championships in 1942. This led to her ending her swimming career in 1944.

Unlike other Danish swimmers, such as Ragnhild Hveger, she did not go to Germany for international competition during the war. (Note: Denmark was occupied by Germany from 1940 to 1945)

== Later life ==
Sørensen received an education in instructing and coaching in 1946, and then taught gymnastics and swimming. After being married in 1948 to Danish engineer Janus Tabur, she followed him to South Africa, and later Canada and then from 1951 the United States. She lived in New Jersey until her death in 2011.

== Bibliography ==
- Heizs, Tommy (2014). Svømmepigerne, der forførte Danmark i 1930'erne [The Swimming Girls who Seduced Denmark in the 1930s] (in Danish). Informations Forlag.
