= Trude Wollschläger =

German swimmer

Personal information
- Born: 9 November 1912 Duisburg, Germany
- Died: 8 July 1975 (aged 62) Duisburg, Germany

Sport
- Sport: Swimming

Trude Wollschläger (9 November 1912 – 8 July 1975) was a German swimmer. She competed in the women's 200 metre breaststroke at the 1936 Summer Olympics.
