= Janet Sheather =

Canadian swimmer

Personal information
- Nationality: Canadian
- Born: 1912 Port Credit, Ontario, Canada
- Died: 11 September 1945 (aged 32–33) Port Credit, Ontario, Canada

Sport
- Sport: Swimming

Janet Ada Rosalie Sheather (1912 – 11 September 1945) was a Canadian swimmer. She competed in the women's 200 metre breaststroke at the 1932 Summer Olympics.

Sheather committed suicide by shooting herself in 1945.
