= Truus Kerkmeester =

Dutch swimmer (1921–1990)

Personal information
- Born: 6 December 1921 Utrecht, Netherlands
- Died: 16 June 1990 (aged 68) Mora, Sweden

Sport
- Sport: Swimming

Truus Kerkmeester (6 December 1921 – 16 June 1990) was a Dutch swimmer. She competed in the women's 100 metre backstroke at the 1936 Summer Olympics.
