= Unoko Tsuboi =

Japanese swimmer

Personal information
- Born: 13 December 1917 Kyoto, Kyoto, Japan
- Died: 4 November 1940 (aged 22) Shanghai, Republic of China

Sport
- Sport: Swimming

Unoko Tsuboi (壷井 宇乃子, Tsuboi Unoko; 13 December 1917 – 4 November 1940) was a Japanese swimmer. She competed in the women's 200 metre breaststroke at the 1936 Summer Olympics.
