= Irén Győrffy =

Hungarian swimmer

Personal information
- Born: 10 February 1920
- Died: 30 October 1950 (aged 30)

Sport
- Sport: Swimming

Irén Győrffy (10 February 1920 – 30 October 1950) was a Hungarian swimmer. She competed in the women's 100 metre backstroke at the 1936 Summer Olympics. She set a national record for the 100 meter backstroke at 1 minute, 24.2 seconds that was broken in 1941.
