= Valborg Christensen =

Danish swimmer

Personal information
- Born: 12 January 1917 Copenhagen, Denmark
- Died: 14 June 2003 (aged 86) Calgary, Alberta, Canada

Sport
- Sport: Swimming

Valborg Christensen (12 January 1917 – 14 June 2003) was a Danish swimmer. She competed in the women's 200 metre breaststroke at the 1936 Summer Olympics.
