= Caspar Schrøder =

Danish fencer

Personal information
- Born: 5 December 1905 Auning, Denmark
- Died: 25 April 1989 (aged 83) Kalundborg, Denmark

Sport
- Sport: Fencing

Caspar Schrøder (5 December 1905 – 25 April 1989) was a Danish fencer. He competed in the individual and team foil and team épée events at the 1936 Summer Olympics.
