= Else Jacobsen =

Danish swimmer (1911–1965)

Personal information
- Born: May 31, 1911
- Died: April 3, 1965 (aged 53)

Sport
- Sport: Swimming
Medal record
Representing Denmark
Olympic Games
Bronze medal – third place	1932 Los Angeles	200 m breaststroke

Else Agnes Ella Jacobsen (later Baade) (31 May 1911 – 3 April 1965) was a Danish swimmer who competed in the 1928 Summer Olympics and 1932 Summer Olympics.

In the 1928 Olympics, she was fourth in the 200 metre breaststroke event and fourth in her first round heat of the 100 metre backstroke event and did not advance. Four years later, she won a bronze medal in the 200 metre breaststroke event at the 1932 Olympics.
