= Preben Christiansen =

Danish fencer

Personal information
- Born: 7 December 1913
- Died: 22 May 1979 (aged 65) Herlev, Denmark

Sport
- Sport: Fencing

Preben Christiansen (7 December 1913 – 22 May 1979) was a Danish fencer. He competed in the individual and team épée and sabre events at the 1936 Summer Olympics.
