= Jørgen Jørgensen (swimmer) =

Danish swimmer (1914–1961)

Personal information
- Born: 16 March 1914 Copenhagen, Denmark
- Died: 24 November 1961 (aged 47) Gentofte, Denmark

Sport
- Sport: Swimming

Jørgen Jørgensen (16 March 1914 – 24 November 1961) was a Danish freestyle swimmer. He competed in three events at the 1936 Summer Olympics.
