= Erik Hammer Sørensen =

Danish fencer

Personal information
- Born: 3 September 1902 Aarhus, Denmark
- Died: 21 January 1973 (aged 70) Aarhus, Denmark

Sport
- Sport: Fencing

Erik Hammer Sørensen (3 September 1902 – 21 January 1973) was a Danish fencer. He competed in five events at the 1936 Summer Olympics.
