= Tove Bruunstrøm =

Danish swimmer

Personal information
- Born: October 10, 1920 Copenhagen, Denmark
- Died: April 13, 2007 (aged 86)

Sport
- Sport: Swimming
- Strokes: Backstroke, freestyle

Tove Bruunstrøm Madsen, later Jensen (October 10, 1920 – April 13, 2007), was a Danish backstroke and freestyle swimmer who competed in the 1936 Summer Olympics. She was born in Copenhagen. She was the wife of Finn Jensen. In 1936 she finished fifth in the 100 metre backstroke competition. She was also a member of the Danish relay team which finished seventh in the 4×100 metre freestyle relay event.
