= Svend Jacobsen =

Danish fencer (1906–1986)

Personal information
- Born: 19 August 1906 Copenhagen, Denmark
- Died: 11 February 1986 (aged 79) Farum, Denmark

Sport
- Sport: Fencing

Svend Jacobsen (19 August 1906 – 11 February 1986) was a Danish fencer. He competed in the individual and team foil and team sabre events at the 1936 Summer Olympics.
