= Edel Nielsen =

Danish swimmer

Personal information
- Born: 19 April 1912 Copenhagen, Denmark
- Died: 15 January 1969 (aged 56) Copenhagen, Denmark

Sport
- Sport: Swimming

Edel Nielsen (19 April 1912 – 15 January 1969) was a Danish swimmer. She competed in the women's 200 metre breaststroke at the 1936 Summer Olympics.
