= Maehata Gaho =

Japanese artisan (born 1936)

Maehata Gaho (前端雅峯) is a traditional Japanese lacquer artist who is renowned for creating exceptional traditional utensils used in the Japanese tea ceremony and utilizing Rimpa school motifs in his lacquer works.

Born as the first son of Maehata Shunsai (前端春斉), the eighth head of the Maehata household, Maehata Gaho received his training in lacquered tea utensils from Murata Doukan, ishiji-nuri lacquer from Nakamura Chokan, and Kaga Maki-e from Hoya Bisei.

Maehata Gaho established Mugen-an (Ishikawa Prefectural Cultural Heritage)in 1983. Mugenan is a modern Shoin-zukuri style house which inherits the traditional elements of a samurai residence. In 2003, he was commissioned to oversee the restoration work at Kenchouji temple (Important Cultural Property).

Maehata Gaho's philosophy in creating a piece is that "one should treat every object as if it were a precious jewel" so that the object itself becomes a statement. Additionally, Maehata Gaho's mission is to create works that will be valued by the next generation.
