= Martha Genenger =

German swimmer (1911–1995)

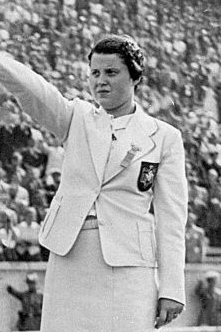
- Martha Genenger at the 1936 Olympics

Personal information
- Born: 11 November 1911 Krefeld, Germany
- Died: 1 August 1995 (aged 83) Moers, Germany

Sport
- Sport: Swimming
Medal record
Representing Germany
Summer Olympics
Silver medal – second place	1936 Berlin	200 m breaststroke
European Championships
Gold medal – first place	1934 Magdeburg	200 m breaststroke

Martha Ludowika Genenger (later Engfeld, 11 November 1911 – 1 August 1995) was a German swimmer. She won a European title in 1934 and a silver medal at the 1936 Summer Olympics in the 200 m breaststroke event.
