= Maria Lenk =

Brazilian swimmer (1915–2007)

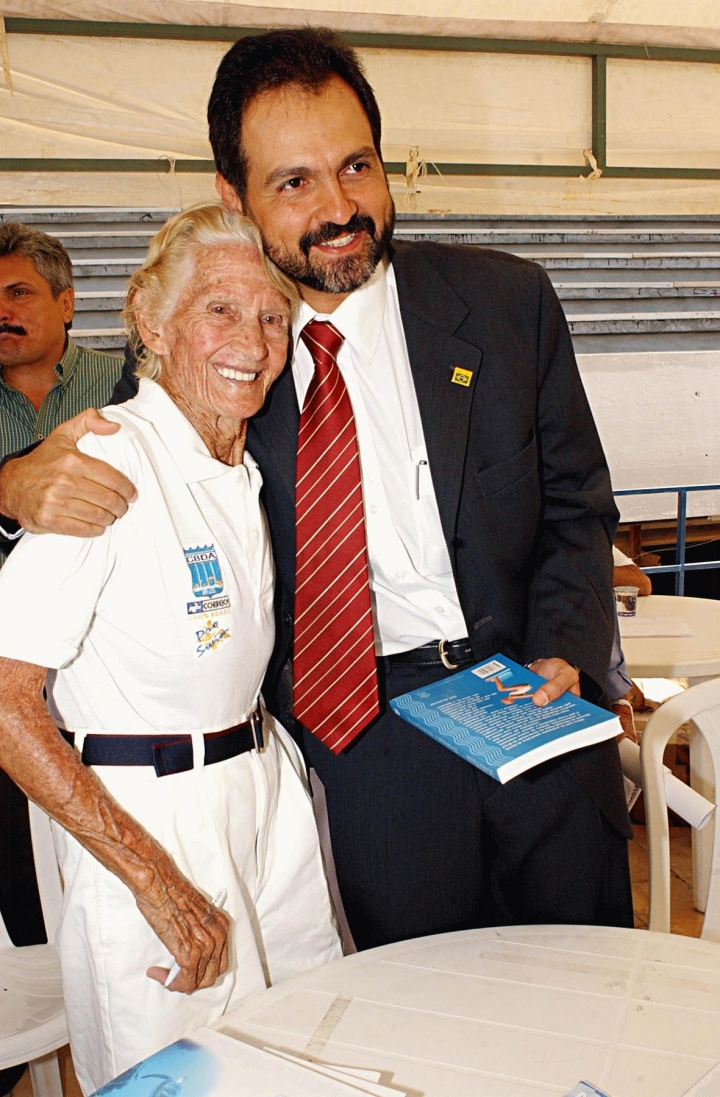
- Lenk with then-Brazilian Minister of Sports Agnelo Queiroz, 2003

Personal information
- National team: Brazil
- Born: January 15, 1915 São Paulo, Brazil
- Died: April 16, 2007 (aged 92) Rio de Janeiro, Brazil

Sport
- Sport: Swimming

Maria Emma Hulga Lenk (January 15, 1915 – April 16, 2007) was a Brazilian swimmer, the first South American woman to participate in the Summer Olympic Games, in 1932 (Los Angeles).

== Biography ==
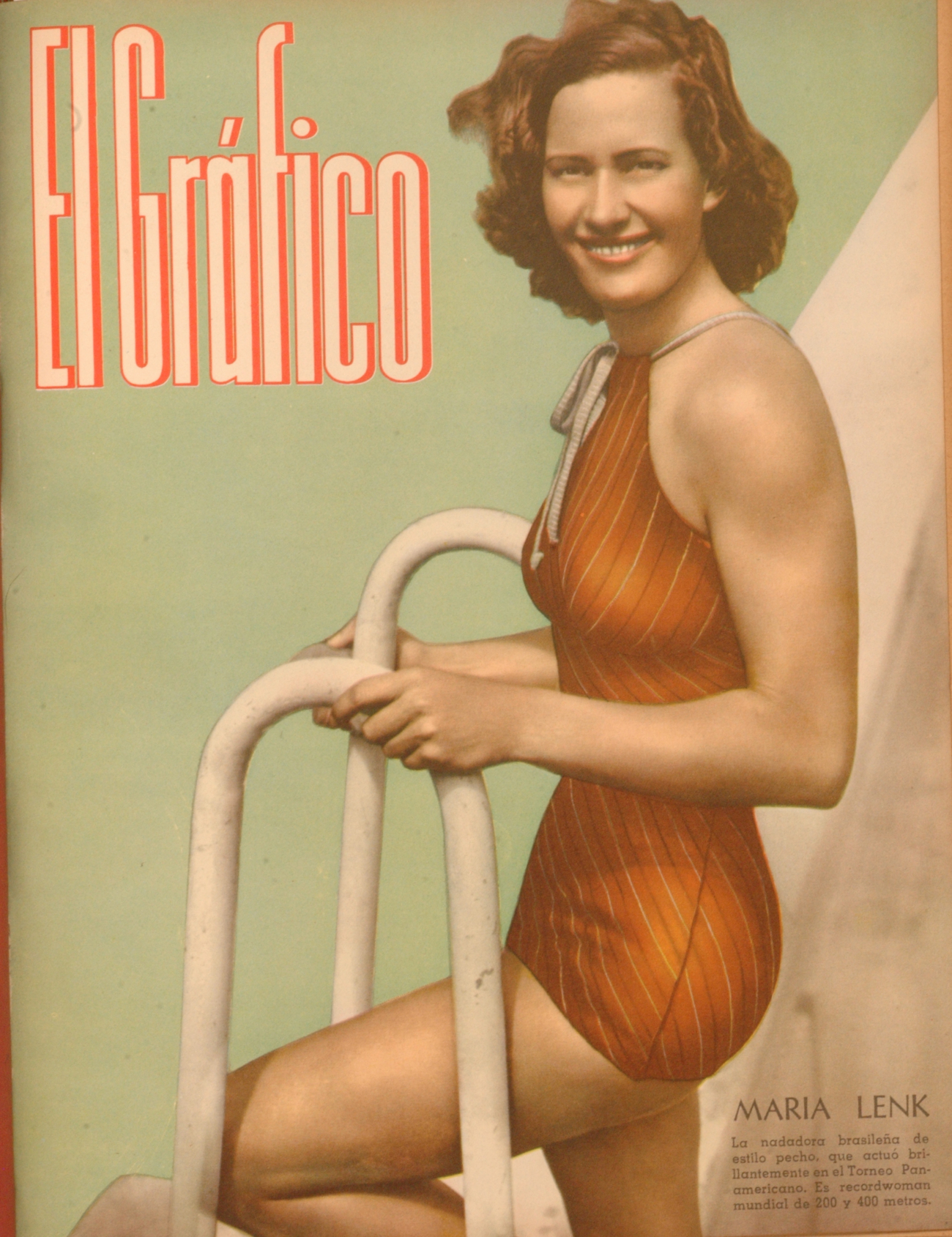
Maria Lenk in 1940.

Born in São Paulo, Maria Lenk was the first Brazilian in history to set a world record in swimming. On November 8, 1939, in Rio de Janeiro with a time of 2:56.0, she beat Jopie Waalberg's previous record of 2:56.9, for the 200m breaststroke event. This record lasted almost 5 years, until Nel van Vliet, from the Netherlands broke it on August 17, 1946, with a time of 2:52.6.

In the same year, she also broke the world record for the discontinued category of 400m breaststroke, with a time of 6:15.8.

She also participated in the 1936 Summer Olympics, in Berlin, where she reached the semifinals of the 200m breaststroke event. In this occasion, she also became the first woman in the world to swim the Butterfly stroke in an official competition. At the time, the Butterfly stroke was used as a form of swimming the Breaststroke, and not yet recognized as a separate swimming stroke. Lenk's account of the event was that at the time she subscribed to a German specialized magazine that ran a story on David Armbruster's and Jack Sieg's work in developing "a new way of swimming the Breaststroke". She became interested and started practicing the stroke by herself in her training sections. In 1936, she and Jack Sieg were the only two people that were prepared to use the technique in the Breaststroke events at the Summer Olympics.

Lenk's goal of winning an Olympic medal was cut short when World War II caused the cancellation of the Games of 1940 and 1944, which would have corresponded to her peak in competitive swimming.

She retired in 1942, but never stopped swimming, focusing on Masters events.

On April 16, 2007, she was training in the Clube de Regatas do Flamengo's swimming pool when her blood pressure dropped and she suffered a sudden respiratory arrest. She was taken to Copa D'Or Hospital, in Copacabana, but medical personnel couldn't revive her and she died of cardiac arrest, aged 92.

Before her death, Maria Lenk still swam 1½ kilometres every day, even in her 90s.

== Master World Records ==
At the time of her death, Maria Lenk still held five Master World Records:

Pool	Age Group	Time	Event	Date
LC	90-94	1:25.91	50m breaststroke	December 18, 2005
LC	90-94	3:12.88	100m breaststroke	August 15, 2005
LC	90-94	6:57.76	200m breaststroke	August 15, 2005
SC	85-89	2:29.90	100m breaststroke	April 9, 2000
SC	90-94	6:37.73	200m breaststroke	April 21, 2005

== Awards ==
- In 1988, she was inducted the FINA Swimming Hall of Fame and, in the same year, was awarded the "Top Ten" award given to the best masters swimmers worldwide.
- In 2004, she received the Adhemar Ferreira da Silva Trophy for lifetime achievement from the Brazilian Olympic Committee at the Prêmio Brasil Olímpico, an annual award given to the best athletes in each Olympic sport.
- On February 12, 2007, the mayor of Rio de Janeiro, César Maia, officially gave her name to the Maria Lenk Aquatics Centre that held swimming, diving and synchronized swimming events at the 2007 Pan American Games, in Rio de Janeiro. It also hosted aquatic events at the 2016 Olympics.
- On April 17, 2007, one day after her death, the president of the Confederação Brasileira de Desportos Aquáticos (Brazilian Aquatic Sports Confederation), Coaracy Nunes, announced that the name of the Troféu Brasil de Natação (Brazilian Swimming Trophy) had been changed to the Maria Lenk Trophy in Lenk's honour.

== See also ==
- List of members of the International Swimming Hall of Fame

Records
Preceded by (Netherlands) Jopie Waalberg	Women's 200 metre breaststroke world record holder (long course); 8 November 1939 – 19 March 1941	Succeeded by (Germany) Anni Kapell
