= Hideko Maehata =

Japanese swimmer (1914–1995)

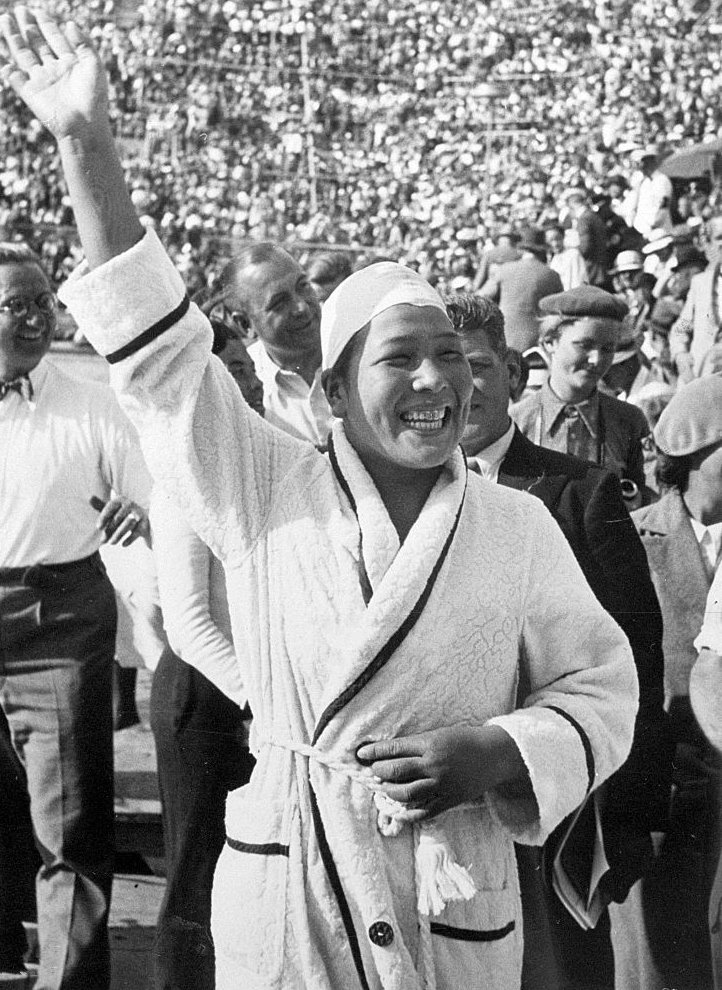
- Hideko Maehata at the 1936 Olympics

Personal information
- Full name: 前畑 秀子
- Nationality: Japanese
- Born: May 20, 1914 Hashimoto, Wakayama, Japan
- Died: February 24, 1995 (aged 80)

Sport
- Sport: Swimming
- Strokes: breaststroke
Medal record
Women's swimming
Representing Japan
Olympic Games
| Gold medal – first place | 1936 Berlin | 200 m breaststroke |
| Silver medal – second place | 1932 Los Angeles | 200 m breaststroke |

Hideko Maehata (前畑 秀子, Maehata Hideko; May 20, 1914 – February 24, 1995) was a Japanese breaststroke swimmer. She was the first Japanese and Asian woman to win a gold medal in the Olympics.

Maehata was born in Hashimoto, Wakayama, as the daughter of a tofu producer and as a child learned to swim in the Kinokawa River. In the fifth grade of elementary school, she set an unofficial youth record for the 50-meter breaststroke. She went on to win numerous competitions, and was sponsored to attend a women’s boarding school in Nagoya which specialized in swimming, but the sudden death of her parents in 1931 forced her to return home. Yet she was selected for the Japanese Olympic swimming team for the 1932 Summer Olympics in Los Angeles, and won the silver medal in the 200 m breaststroke event. She lost to Clare Dennis a mere 0.1 of a second.

During the post-Olympic celebration after her return to Japan, she stated that she was considering to retire from competitive swimming due to family issues, but then Tokyo mayor Hidejirō Nagata reportedly asked her why she did not bring back a gold medal. Over the next four years, Maehata trained very hard, and set a new world record for the 200-meter breaststroke on September 30, 1933.

During the 1936 Berlin Olympics, Maehata competed in a dead heat against the reigning German national champion, Martha Genenger, winning the gold medal for the Women's 200 m breaststroke by over one second. Despite the time difference, the race was broadcast live in Japan by NHK Radio.

In 1937, Maehata married Masahiko Hyodo, a professor of the medical school of Nagoya University, and retired from competition. She was awarded the Purple Ribbon of Merit by the Japanese government in 1964 and inducted into the International Swimming Hall of Fame in 1979. She had a cerebral hemorrhage in 1983, which killed both her parents, but recovered. In 1990 she was designated a Person of Cultural Merit, the first sportswoman in Japan to receive such an honor. She died of acute renal failure in 1995.

== See also ==
- Idaten (TV series)
- Japan at the 1932 Summer Olympics
- Japan at the 1936 Summer Olympics
- List of members of the International Swimming Hall of Fame
