= Poul Petersen (swimmer) =

Danish swimmer

Personal information
- Born: 25 August 1912 Rørvig, Denmark
- Died: 14 February 1959 (aged 46) Copenhagen, Denmark

Sport
- Sport: Swimming

Poul Petersen (25 August 1912 – 14 February 1959) was a Danish freestyle swimmer. He competed in three events at the 1936 Summer Olympics.
