= Tove Nielsen (swimmer) =

Danish swimmer

Personal information
- Born: 28 March 1917 Copenhagen, Denmark
- Died: 8 November 2002 (aged 85) Næstved, Denmark

Sport
- Sport: Swimming

Tove Nielsen (28 March 1917 – 8 November 2002) was a Danish swimmer. She competed in the women's 100 metre backstroke at the 1936 Summer Olympics.
