= New Zealand at the 1938 British Empire Games =

- CG code: NZL
- CGA: New Zealand Olympic and British Empire Games Association
- Website: www.olympic.org.nz

in Sydney, New South Wales, Australia
- Competitors: 69
- Flag bearers: Opening: Jim Leckie; Closing:
- Officials: 13
- Medals Ranked 5th: Gold 5 Silver 7 Bronze 13 Total 25

British Empire Games appearances
- 1930; 1934; 1938; 1950; 1954; 1958; 1962; 1966; 1970; 1974; 1978; 1982; 1986; 1990; 1994; 1998; 2002; 2006; 2010; 2014; 2018; 2022; 2026; 2030

New Zealand at the 1938 British Empire Games was represented by a team of 69 competitors and 13 officials, including 18 athletes, 15 rowers, eight swimmers and divers, and seven each of boxers, cyclists and wrestlers. Selection of the team for the Games in Sydney, New South Wales, Australia, was the responsibility of the New Zealand Olympic and British Empire Games Association. New Zealand's flagbearer at the opening ceremony was Jim Leckie. The New Zealand team finished fifth on the medal table, winning a total of 25 medals, five of which were gold.

New Zealand has competed in every games, starting with the British Empire Games in 1930 at Hamilton, Ontario.

== Medal tables ==
| Medal | Name | Sport | Event |
|---|---|---|---|
| Gold | Pat Boot | Athletics | Men's 880 yards |
| Gold | Cecil Matthews | Athletics | Men's 3 miles |
| Gold | Cecil Matthews | Athletics | Men's 6 miles |
| Gold | Bill Bremner; Ernie Jury; Alec Robertson; Bill Whittaker | Lawn bowls | Men's four |
| Gold | Walter Denison; Lance Macey | Lawn bowls | Men's pairs |
| Silver | Stan Lay | Athletics | Men's javelin throw |
| Silver | Darcy Heeney | Boxing | Men's welterweight |
| Silver | John Brown | Cycling | Men's road race |
| Silver | Frank Livingstone | Lawn bowls | Men's singles |
| Silver | Ken Boswell; George Burns (cox); Jim Clayton; Albert Hope; John Rigby | Rowing | Men's coxed four |
| Silver | Vernon Thomas | Wrestling | Men's lightweight |
| Silver | Jim Dryden | Wrestling | Men's heavyweight |
| Bronze | Arnold Anderson; Graham Quinn; Alan Sayers; Harold Tyrie | Athletics | Men's 4 × 440 yards relay |
| Bronze | Pat Boot | Athletics | Men's 1 mile |
| Bronze | Betty Forbes | Athletics | Women's high jump |
| Bronze | Jim Leckie | Athletics | Men's hammer throw |
| Bronze | Rona Tong | Athletics | Women's 80 m hurdles |
| Bronze | Kenneth Moran | Boxing | Men's featherweight |
| Bronze | George Giles | Cycling | Men's sprint |
| Bronze | Howard Benge; John Charters; Oswald Denison; James Gould; Gus Jackson; Les Pithie; Cyril Stiles; William Stodart (cox); Rangi Thompson | Rowing | Men's eight |
| Bronze | Gus Jackson; Robert Smith | Rowing | Men's double sculls |
| Bronze | Robert Smith | Rowing | Men's single sculls |
| Bronze | Mona Leydon | Swimming | Women's 440 yards freestyle |
| Bronze | Joe Genet | Wrestling | Men's featherweight |
| Bronze | Jeremiah Podjursky | Wrestling | Men's welterweight |

Medals by sport
| Sport | Gold medal | Silver medal | Bronze medal | Total |
| Athletics | 3 | 1 | 5 | 9 |
| Lawn bowls | 2 | 1 | 0 | 3 |
| Wrestling | 0 | 2 | 2 | 4 |
| Rowing | 0 | 1 | 3 | 4 |
| Boxing | 0 | 1 | 1 | 2 |
| Cycling | 0 | 1 | 1 | 2 |
| Swimming | 0 | 0 | 1 | 1 |
| Total | 5 | 7 | 13 | 25 |

Medals by gender
| Gender | Gold medal | Silver medal | Bronze medal | Total |
| Male | 5 | 7 | 10 | 22 |
| Female | 0 | 0 | 3 | 3 |
| Total | 5 | 7 | 13 | 25 |

== Competitors ==
The following table lists the number of New Zealand competitors participating at the Games per sport/discipline.

| Sport | Men | Women | Total |
|---|---|---|---|
| Athletics | 13 | 5 | 18 |
| Boxing | 7 | —N/a | 7 |
| Cycling | 7 | —N/a | 7 |
| Diving | 0 | 1 | 1 |
| Lawn bowls | 7 | —N/a | 7 |
| Rowing | 15 | —N/a | 15 |
| Swimming | 4 | 3 | 7 |
| Wrestling | 7 | —N/a | 7 |
| Total | 60 | 9 | 69 |

== Athletics ==
=== Track ===
| Athlete | Event | Heat | | Semifinal | | Final | |
| Athlete | Event | Result | Rank (Note: Ranks given are within the heat) | Result | Rank (Note: Ranks given are within the semifinal) | Result | Rank |
|---|---|---|---|---|---|---|---|
| Theo Allen | Men's 880 yards | 1:54.5 | 1 | —N/a | | | 5 |
| Theo Allen | Men's 1 mile | 4:20.0 | 4 | —N/a | | DNF | |
| Arnold Anderson | Men's 440 yards hurdles | —N/a | | | | | 5 |
| Pat Boot | Men's 880 yards | 1:52.3 GR | 1 | —N/a | | 1:51.2 GR | 1st place, gold medalist(s) |
| Pat Boot | Men's 1 mile | | 2 | —N/a | | 4:12.6 | 3rd place, bronze medalist(s) |
| Alan Geddes | Men's 3 miles | —N/a | | | | | 7 |
| Alan Geddes | Men's 6 miles | —N/a | | | | | 4 |
| Doreen Lumley | Women's 100 yards | | 2 | | 4 | did not advance | |
| Doreen Lumley | Women's 220 yards | DQ | | did not advance | | | |
| Cecil Matthews | Men's 3 miles | —N/a | | | | 13:59.6 GR | 1st place, gold medalist(s) |
| Cecil Matthews | Men's 6 miles | —N/a | | | | 30:14.5 GR | 1st place, gold medalist(s) |
| Bill Pullar | Men's 1 mile | 4:19.5 | 3 | —N/a | | | 6 |
| Graham Quinn | Men's 100 yards | | 5 | did not advance | | | |
| Graham Quinn | Men's 220 yards | | 2 | | 5 | did not advance | |
| Alan Sayers | Men's 220 yards | | 5 | did not advance | | | |
| Alan Sayers | Men's 440 yards | | 3 | —N/a | | did not advance | |
| Frank Sharpley | Men's 100 yards | | 3 | 10.4 | 6 | did not advance | |
| Frank Sharpley | Men's 120 yards hurdles | | 3 | —N/a | | 15.0 | 6 |
| Doris Strachan | Women's 100 yards | 11.8 | 4 | did not advance | | | |
| Doris Strachan | Women's 220 yards | | 4 | did not advance | | | |
| Rona Tong | Women's 80 yards hurdles | | 2 | —N/a | | 11.8 | 3rd place, bronze medalist(s) |
| Rona Tong | Women's 100 yards | | 5 | did not advance | | | |
| Harold Tyrie | Men's 440 yards | 49.3 | 2 | —N/a | | | 6 |
| Arnold Anderson; Graham Quinn; Alan Sayers; Harold Tyrie | Men's 4 x 440 yards relay | —N/a | | | | 3:22.0 | 3rd place, bronze medalist(s) |
| Doreen Lumley; Doris Strachan; Rona Tong | Women's 110-220-110 yards relay | —N/a | | | | | 4 |

=== Field ===
| Athlete | Event | Final | |
| Athlete | Event | Result | Rank |
|---|---|---|---|
| Betty Forbes | Women's high jump | 5 ft 2 in (1.57 m) | 3rd place, bronze medalist(s) |
| Stan Lay | Men's javelin throw | 204 ft 1 1/4 in (62.21 m) | 2nd place, silver medalist(s) |
| Jim Leckie | Men's discus throw | DNS | |
| Jim Leckie | Men's hammer throw | 145 ft 5 1/2 in (44.34 m) | 3rd place, bronze medalist(s) |
| Mary Mitchell | Women's javelin throw | 118 ft 1/2 in (35.98 m) | 4 |
| Jack Morgan | Men's discus throw | 119 ft 11 1/2 in (36.56 m) | 8 |
| Doris Strachan | Women's long jump | 17 ft 3/4 in (5.20 m) | 6 |

== Boxing ==
| Athlete | Event | Quarter Final | Semi Final | Final / BM | Rank |
| Athlete | Event | Opposition Result | Opposition Result | Opposition Result | Rank |
|---|---|---|---|---|---|
| Hugh Sheridan | Flyweight | Bye | Joubert (SAF); L | Cameron (SCO); L | 4 |
| Jack Parker | Bantamweight | Butler (ENG); L | did not advance | | |
| Kenneth Moran | Featherweight | Bye | Henricus (CEY); L | Harper (ENG); W | 3rd place, bronze medalist(s) |
| Joseph Collins | Lightweight | Fulton (SRH); L | did not advance | | |
| Darcy Heeney | Welterweight | Bye | Tsirindanis (SRH); W | Smith (AUS); L | 2nd place, silver medalist(s) |
| Artie Sutherland | Middleweight | Reardon (WAL); L | did not advance | | |
| Ron Withell | Heavyweight | —N/a | Sterley (SAF); L | Harley (AUS); L | 4 |

== Cycling ==
=== Road ===
Men's road race

| Athlete | Time | Rank |
|---|---|---|
| John Brown | 2:53:29 | 2nd place, silver medalist(s) |
| Frank Grose | DNF | |
| Ronald Triner | | 7 |

=== Track ===
Men's 1000 m sprint

| Athlete | Heat | Repechage | Quarterfinals | Semifinals | Final / BM | |
| Athlete | Opposition Time | Opposition Time | Opposition Time | Opposition Time | Opposition Time | Rank |
|---|---|---|---|---|---|---|
| George Giles | Das (IND); W 12.9 | —N/a | Johnson (AUS); W 13.0 | Porter (AUS); L 12.9 | Ulmer (NZL); W 12.9 | 3rd place, bronze medalist(s) |
| Roy Taylor | Porter (AUS); W 12.5 | —N/a | Gray (AUS); L 12.7 | did not advance | | |
| Ron Ulmer | Gray (AUS); W 13.0 | —N/a | Hicks (ENG); W 12.8 | Gray (AUS); L 12.9 | Giles (NZL); L 12.9 | 4 |

Men's 1 km time trial

| Athlete | Time | Rank |
|---|---|---|
| George Giles | 1:17.3 | 9 |
| Roy Taylor | 1:16.7 | 7 |
| Ron Ulmer | 1:16.6 | 6 |

Men's 10 miles track race

| Athlete | Time | Rank |
|---|---|---|
| George Giles | DNF | |
| Gordon Patrick | unplaced | |
| Ron Ulmer | DNF | |

== Diving ==
| Athlete | Event | Final | |
| Athlete | Event | Points | Rank |
|---|---|---|---|
| Gwen Rix | Women's 3 m springboard | 65.86 | 6 |

== Lawn bowls ==
| Athlete | Event | Round robin | | | | | Playoff | Rank |
| Athlete | Event | Opposition Score | Opposition Score | Opposition Score | Opposition Score | Opposition Score | Opposition Score | Rank |
|---|---|---|---|---|---|---|---|---|
| Frank Livingstone | Men's singles | Clarke (NIR); W 26 – 5 | Hills (ENG); W 27 – 18 | Low (AUS); W 25 – 12 | Harvey (SAF); L 19 – 26 | Bourne (SRH); W 26 – 9 | —N/a | 2nd place, silver medalist(s) |
| Lance Macey; Walter Denison | Men's pairs | England; W 22 – 20 | Fiji; L 20 – 21 | South Africa; W 24 – 13 | Scotland; W 25 – 21 | Australia; W 25 – 21 | —N/a | 1st place, gold medalist(s) |
| Bill Whittaker; Alec Robertson; Ernie Jury; Bill Bremner | Men's four | Fiji; W 26 – 11 | Canada; W 21 – 19 | Australia; W 19 – 14 | South Africa; L 16 – 17 | England; W 22 – 12 | South Africa; W 19 – 6 | 1st place, gold medalist(s) |

== Rowing ==
| Athlete | Event | Rank |
|---|---|---|
| Bob Smith | Men's single sculls | 3rd place, bronze medalist(s) |
| Gus Jackson; Bob Smith | Men's double sculls | 3rd place, bronze medalist(s) |
| John Rigby; Ken Boswell; Albert Hope; Jim Clayton; George Burns (cox) | Men's coxed four | 2nd place, silver medalist(s) |
| Les Pithie; Oswald Denison; John Charters; Howard Benge; Gus Jackson; Cyril Stiles; Rangi Thompson; James Gould; William Stodart (cox) | Men's eight | 3rd place, bronze medalist(s) |

Percival Stowers and Cliff Johnson accompanied the team as emergencies, but did not compete.

== Swimming ==
| Athlete | Event | Heat | | Final | |
| Athlete | Event | Result | Rank (Note: Ranks given are within the heat) | Result | Rank |
|---|---|---|---|---|---|
| Noel Crump | Men's 110 yards freestyle | | 4 | did not advance | |
| Noel Crump | Men's 440 yards freestyle | | 5 | did not advance | |
| Jack Davies | Men's 220 yards breaststroke | 3:10.4 | 4 | did not advance | |
| Winnie Dunn | Women's 220 yards breaststroke | —N/a | | | 7 |
| Peter Hanan | Men's 110 yards freestyle | 1:00.5 | 4 q | | 5 |
| Mona Leydon | Women's 440 yards freestyle | 5:36.8 | 2 Q | 5:42.0 | 3rd place, bronze medalist(s) |
| Joyce Macdonald | Women's 110 yards backstroke | 1:28.6 | | did not advance | |
| Len Newell | Men's 440 yards freestyle | | 7 | did not advance | |
| Len Newell | Men's 1650 yards freestyle | DNF | | did not advance | |
| Joyce Macdonald; Mona Leydon; Winnie Dunn | Women's 3 x 110 yards medley relay | —N/a | | 4:22.3 | 5 |

== Wrestling ==
| Athlete | Event | Elimination rounds | | | Final | Rank |
| Athlete | Event | Opposition Result | Opposition Result | Opposition Result | Opposition Result | Rank |
|---|---|---|---|---|---|---|
| Leo Nolan | Bantamweight | Purcell (AUS); W | Cazaux (ENG); L | Blake (CAN); L | —N/a | 4 |
| Joseph Genet | Featherweight | Purchase (ENG); L | Clarke (CAN); L | —N/a | —N/a | 3rd place, bronze medalist(s) |
| Vernon Thomas | Lightweight | Bye | Garrard (AUS); L | Harding (SAF); W | —N/a | 2nd place, silver medalist(s) |
| Jerry Podjursky | Welterweight | Trevaskis (AUS); L | Stander (SAF); L | —N/a | Did not advance | 3rd place, bronze medalist(s) |
| Harcourt Godfrey | Middleweight | Bye | Jeffers (ENG); L | Sheasby (SAF); L | did not advance | |
| Torsten Anderson | Light heavyweight | Greenspan (SAF); L | Scarf (AUS); L | —N/a | Did not advance | 4 |
| Jim Dryden | Heavyweight | Dudgeon (SCO); W | Whelan (CAN); W | —N/a | Knight (AUS); L | 2nd place, silver medalist(s) |

== Officials ==
- Team manager – H. McCormick
- Deputy team manager – Dolph Kitto
- Athletics coach – B. R. McKernan
- Boxing manager – F. Hughes
- Cycling manager – H. L. Grant
- Lawn bowls
  - Manager – A. Whitten
  - Assistant manager – E. Petty
- Rowing
  - Manager – Allen Hale
  - Coach – Herbert Ayers
- Swimming manager – Edward Clarke Isaacs
- Wrestling
  - Manager – J. Creeke
  - Coach – A. Craig
- Chaperone – E. G. Sutherland

== See also ==
- New Zealand Olympic Committee
- New Zealand at the Commonwealth Games
- New Zealand at the 1936 Summer Olympics
