= Athletics at the 1938 British Empire Games – Men's 4 × 440 yards relay =

Men's 4 × 440 yards relay at the Commonwealth Games

The men's 4 × 440 yards relay event at the 1938 British Empire Games was held on 12 February at the Sydney Cricket Ground in Sydney, Australia.

== Results ==
Rank	Nation	Athletes	Time	Notes
1st place, gold medalist(s)	Canada	Lee Orr, Bill Dale, William Fritz, John Loaring	3:16.9	
2nd place, silver medalist(s)	England	Frank Handley, Henry Pack, Brian MacCabe, Bill Roberts	3:19.2	20 yards behind
3rd place, bronze medalist(s)	New Zealand	Alan Sayers, Arnold Anderson, Graham Quinn, Harold Tyrie	3:22.0	25 yards behind
4	Australia	John Park, Vernon Wallace, Hugh Johnson, Athol Jones	?:??.?	
