= Athletics at the 1938 British Empire Games – Men's 440 yards =

Men's 440 yards at the Commonwealth Games

The men's 440 yards event at the 1938 British Empire Games was held on 10 and 12 February at the Sydney Cricket Ground in Sydney, Australia.

== Medalists ==
| Gold | Silver | Bronze |
|---|---|---|
| Bill Roberts; England | William Fritz; Canada | Denis Shore; South Africa |

== Results ==
=== Heats ===
Qualification: First 2 in each heat (Q) qualify directly for the final.

| Rank | Heat | Name | Nationality | Time | Notes |
|---|---|---|---|---|---|
| 1 | 1 | Denis Shore | South Africa | 47.9 | Q, GR |
| 2 | 1 | John Mumford | Australia | 48.3e | Q, 4 yards behind |
| 3 | 1 | Lee Orr | Canada | 48.4e | 1 yard behind |
| 4 | 1 | Hugh Johnson | Australia | ??.? | |
| 5 | 1 | Henry Pack | England | ??.? | |
| 1 | 2 | John Loaring | Canada | 49.2 | Q |
| 2 | 2 | Harold Tyrie | New Zealand | 49.3e | Q, 0.5 yard behind |
| 3 | 2 | Athol Jones | Australia | 49.9e | 5 yards behind |
| 4 | 2 | Brian MacCabe | England | ??.? | |
| 5 | 2 | Frank Handley | England | ??.? | |
| 6 | 2 | John Michie | Canada | ??.? | |
| 1 | 3 | Bill Roberts | England | 48.1 | Q |
| 2 | 3 | William Fritz | Canada | ??.? | Q, 6 yards behind |
| 3 | 3 | Alan Sayers | New Zealand | 50.8e | 15 yards behind |
| 4 | 3 | Francis Scott | Australia | ??.? | |
| | 3 | Duncan White | British Ceylon | DNS | |

=== Final ===
| Rank | Name | Nationality | Time | Notes |
|---|---|---|---|---|
| 1st place, gold medalist(s) | Bill Roberts | England | 47.9 | =GR |
| 2nd place, silver medalist(s) | William Fritz | Canada | 47.9e | Inches behind |
| 3rd place, bronze medalist(s) | Denis Shore | South Africa | 48.1e | 1.5 yards behind |
| 4 | John Mumford | Australia | ??.? | |
| 5 | John Loaring | Canada | 49.2e | |
| 6 | Harold Tyrie | New Zealand | ??.? | |
