= Athletics at the 1938 British Empire Games – Men's 880 yards =

Men's 880 yards at the Commonwealth Games

The men's 880 yards event at the 1938 British Empire Games was held on 5 and 7 February at the Sydney Cricket Ground in Sydney, Australia.

== Medalists ==
Gold	Silver	Bronze
Pat Boot; New Zealand	Frank Handley; England	Bill Dale; Canada

== Results ==
=== Heats ===
Qualification: First 4 in each heat (Q) qualify directly for the final.

Rank	Heat	Name	Nationality	Time	Notes
1	1	Theo Allen	New Zealand	1:54.5	Q
2	1	Gerald Backhouse	Australia	1:55.1e	Q, 5 yards behind
3	1	Frank Handley	England	?:??.?	Q, 11 yards behind
4	1	Nicolaas Wessels	South Africa	?:??.?	Q
5	1	Bernard Eeles	England	?:??.?	
6	1	Max Fleming	Australia	?:??.?	
7	1	Abbot Conway	Canada	?:??.?	
8	1	Alexander Haire	Northern Ireland	?:??.?	
	1	Max Lenover	Canada	DNF	
1	2	Pat Boot	New Zealand	1:52.3	Q, GR
2	2	Brian MacCabe	England	1:53.1e	Q, 4 yards behind
3	2	Jim Alford	Wales	1:53.7e	Q, 2 yards behind
4	2	Bill Dale	Canada	?:??.?	Q
5	2	Robert Graham	Scotland	?:??.?	
6	2	Leslie Goff	Australia	?:??.?	
7	2	Noel Stanford	Trinidad and Tobago	?:??.?	
8	2	Roy Chappel	Australia	?:??.?	
	2	Denis Shore	South Africa	DNS	

=== Final ===
Rank	Name	Nationality	Time	Notes
1st place, gold medalist(s)	Pat Boot	New Zealand	1:51.2	GR
2nd place, silver medalist(s)	Frank Handley	England	1:54.0e	20 yards behind
3rd place, bronze medalist(s)	Bill Dale	Canada	1:54.2e	1 foot behind
4	Jim Alford	Wales	?:??.?	
5	Theo Allen	New Zealand	?:??.?	
6	Brian MacCabe	England	?:??.?	
7	Gerald Backhouse	Australia	?:??.?	
8	Nicolaas Wessels	South Africa	?:??.?	
