= Athletics at the 1938 British Empire Games – Men's 3 miles =

Men's 3 miles at the 1938 British Empire Games
- Venue: Sydney Cricket Ground
- Date: 5 February 1938
- Winning time: 13:59.6

Medalists
gold medal	Cecil Matthews	New Zealand
silver medal	Peter Ward	England
bronze medal	Scotty Rankine	Canada

The men's 3 miles event at the 1938 British Empire Games was held on 5 February at the Sydney Cricket Ground in Sydney, Australia.

== Results ==
Rank	Name	Nationality	Time	Notes
1st place, gold medalist(s)	Cecil Matthews	New Zealand	13:59.6	GR
2nd place, silver medalist(s)	Peter Ward	England	14:05.4	30 yards behind
3rd place, bronze medalist(s)	Scotty Rankine	Canada	14:24.0e	220 yards behind
4	Wally Hayward	South Africa	14:24.4	
5	Stan Nicholls	Australia	14:30.0	
6	Lawrence Weatherill	England	??:??.?	
7	Alan Geddes	New Zealand	??:??.?	
8	Keith Faulkner	Australia	??:??.?	
	Walter Weightman	Australia	DNF	
	Fred Colman	Australia	DNF	
	Milton Wallace	Canada	DNF	
	Arthur Clarke	Canada	DNS	
	Lloyd Longman	Canada	DNS	
	Robert Graham	Scotland	DNS	
