= Athletics at the 1938 British Empire Games – Men's 6 miles =

Men's 6 miles at the 1938 British Empire Games
- Venue: Sydney Cricket Ground
- Date: 10 February 1938
- Winning time: 30:14.5

Medalists
gold medal	Cecil Matthews	New Zealand
silver medal	Scotty Rankine	Canada
bronze medal	Wally Hayward	South Africa

The men's 6 miles event at the 1938 British Empire Games was held on 10 February at the Sydney Cricket Ground in Sydney, Australia.

== Results ==
Rank	Name	Nationality	Time	Notes
1st place, gold medalist(s)	Cecil Matthews	New Zealand	30:14.5	GR
2nd place, silver medalist(s)	Scotty Rankine	Canada	??:??.?	180 yards behind
3rd place, bronze medalist(s)	Wally Hayward	South Africa	??:??.?	250 yards behind
4	Alan Geddes	New Zealand	??:??.?	
5	Lawrence Weatherill	England	??:??.?	
6	Jackie Gibson	South Africa	??:??.?	
7	Milton Wallace	Canada	??:??.?	
8	Fred Bassed	Australia	??:??.?	
9	Stan Millington	Australia	??:??.?	
10	Brendan Doyle	Australia	??:??.?	
	Lloyd Longman	Canada	DNF	
	Peter Ward	England	DNF	
	Noel Stanford	Trinidad and Tobago	DNF	
	Johannes Coleman	South Africa	DQ	
	Walter Weightman	Australia	DNS	
	Arthur Clarke	Canada	DNS	
