= Athletics at the 1938 British Empire Games – Men's discus throw =

Men's discus throw at the Commonwealth Games

The men's discus throw event at the 1938 British Empire Games was held on 10 February at the Sydney Cricket Ground in Sydney, Australia.

== Results ==
Rank	Name	Nationality	Result	Notes
1st place, gold medalist(s)	Eric Coy	Canada	146 ft 10 1/8 in (44.76 m)	GR
2nd place, silver medalist(s)	David Young	Scotland	141 ft 2 5/8 in (43.04 m)	
3rd place, bronze medalist(s)	George Sutherland	Canada	136 ft 0 5/8 in (41.47 m)	
4	Harry Wilson	Australia	133 ft 2 3/4 in (40.61 m)	
5	Keith Pardon	Australia	130 ft 4 1/4 in (39.73 m)	
6	William MacKenzie	Australia	128 ft 11 1/2 in (39.31 m)	
7	Adrian Button	Australia	125 ft 8 1/2 in (38.32 m)	
8	Jack Morgan	New Zealand	119 ft 11 1/2 in (36.56 m)	
9	Jim Courtright	Canada	99 ft 2 1/2 in (30.24 m)	
	Jim Leckie	New Zealand	DNS	
