= Athletics at the 1938 British Empire Games – Women's 110–220–110 yards relay =

The women's 110–220–110 yards relay event at the 1938 British Empire Games was held on 7 February at the Sydney Cricket Ground in Sydney, Australia.

== Results ==
Rank	Nation	Athletes	Time	Notes
1st place, gold medalist(s)	Australia	Jean Coleman, Eileen Wearne, Decima Norman	49.1	
2nd place, silver medalist(s)	Canada	Aileen Meagher, Jeanette Dolson, Barbara Howard	49.9e	7 yards behind
3rd place, bronze medalist(s)	England	Kathleen Stokes, Dorothy Saunders, Winifred Jeffrey	51.3e	12 yards behind
4	New Zealand	Doreen Lumley, Doris Strachan, Rona Tong	??.?	
