= Athletics at the 1938 British Empire Games – Men's shot put =

Men's shot put at the Commonwealth Games

The men's shot put event at the 1938 British Empire Games was held on 12 February at the Sydney Cricket Ground in Sydney, Australia.

== Results ==
Rank	Name	Nationality	Result	Notes
1st place, gold medalist(s)	Louis Fouché	South Africa	47 ft 6 in (14.48 m)	
2nd place, silver medalist(s)	Eric Coy	Canada	45 ft 9 3/8 in (13.95 m)	
3rd place, bronze medalist(s)	Francis Drew	Australia	45 ft 3 3/8 in (13.80 m)	
4	William Plummer	Australia	44 ft 5 5/8 in (13.55 m)	
5	Harry Wilson	Australia	43 ft 3 5/8 in (13.20 m)	
6	Bill MacKenzie	Australia	42 ft 1 3/4 in (12.85 m)	
7	Jim Courtwright	Canada	39 ft 8 1/2 in (12.10 m)	
8	George Sutherland	Canada	39 ft 4 1/4 in (12.00 m)	
	Wallace Brown	Canada	DNS	
	David Young	Scotland	DNS	

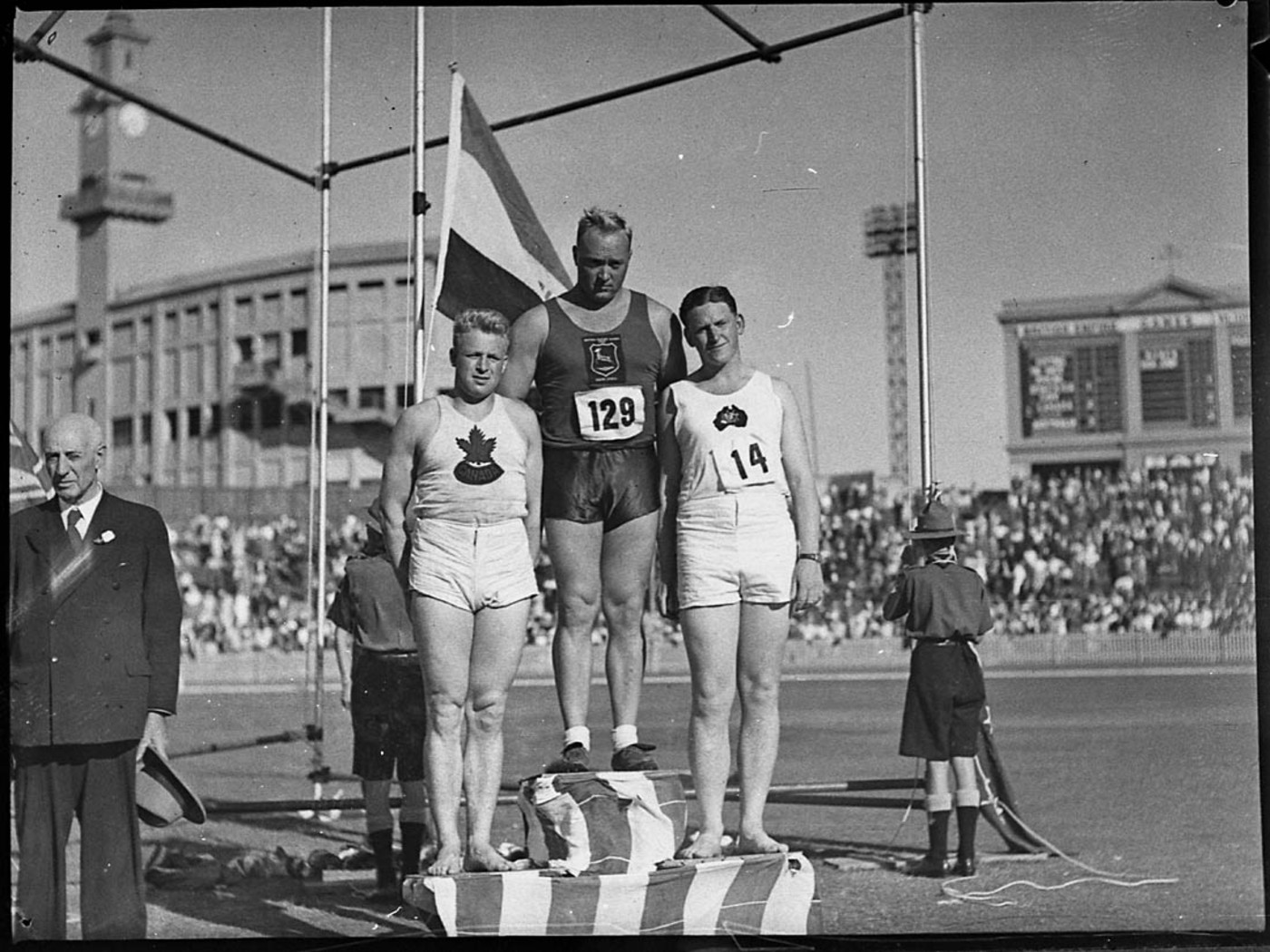
The medal winners
