= Athletics at the 1938 British Empire Games – Men's 440 yards hurdles =

Men's 440 yards hurdles at the Commonwealth Games

The men's 440 yards hurdles event at the 1938 British Empire Games was held on 5 February at the Sydney Cricket Ground in Sydney, Australia.

== Results ==
Rank	Name	Nationality	Time	Notes
1st place, gold medalist(s)	John Loaring	Canada	52.9	GR
2nd place, silver medalist(s)	John Park	Australia	54.6e	6 yards behind
3rd place, bronze medalist(s)	Alan McDougall	Australia	55.2e	2 yards behind
4	Alf Watson	Australia	??.?	
5	Arnold Anderson	New Zealand	??.?	
6	Paul Magee	Australia	??.?	
