= Athletics at the 1938 British Empire Games – Men's hammer throw =

Men's hammer throw at the Commonwealth Games

The men's hammer throw event at the 1938 British Empire Games was held on 10 February at the Sydney Cricket Ground in Sydney, Australia.

== Results ==
Rank	Name	Nationality	Result	Notes
1st place, gold medalist(s)	George Sutherland	Canada	159 ft 9 7/8 in (48.71 m)	GR
2nd place, silver medalist(s)	Keith Pardon	Australia	148 ft 0 1/4 in (45.12 m)	
3rd place, bronze medalist(s)	Jim Leckie	New Zealand	145 ft 0 3/4 in (44.22 m)	
4	Pat McNamara	Australia	139 ft 9 1/2 in (42.61 m)	
5	Myer Rosenblum	Australia	135 ft 9 1/2 in (41.39 m)	
6	Les Graham	Australia	131 ft 5 1/4 in (40.06 m)	
	Eric Coy	Canada	DNS	
