= Athletics at the 1938 British Empire Games – Men's 220 yards hurdles =

The men's 220 yards hurdles event at the 1938 British Empire Games was held as an unofficial invitation event on 7 February at the Sydney Cricket Ground in Sydney, Australia.

== Medalists ==
Gold	Silver	Bronze
Phillip Sharpley; New Zealand	Alan McDougall; Australia	Jack Lobban; Australia

== Results ==
=== Heats ===
Qualification: First 3 in each heat (Q) qualify directly for the final.

Rank	Heat	Name	Nationality	Time	Notes
1	1	Phillip Sharpley	New Zealand	24.9	Q
2	1	John Park	Australia	??.?	Q, 7 yards behind
3	1	Alan McDougall	Australia	??.?	Q, 4 yards behind
1	2	Arnold Anderson	New Zealand	25.7	Q
2	2	Jack Lobban	Australia	??.?	Q, 0.5 yard behind
3	2	E. Newburgh	New Zealand	??.?	Q, 0.5 yard behind
4	2	R. Ralph	Australia	??.?	

=== Final ===
Rank	Name	Nationality	Time	Notes
1st place, gold medalist(s)	Phillip Sharpley	New Zealand	24.7	
2nd place, silver medalist(s)	Alan McDougall	Australia	??.?	2 yards behind
3rd place, bronze medalist(s)	Jack Lobban	Australia	??.?	0.5 yard behind
4	John Park	Australia	??.?	
5	E. Newburgh	New Zealand	??.?	
6	Arnold Anderson	New Zealand	??.?	
