= Athletics at the 1938 British Empire Games – Women's javelin throw =

Women's javelin throw at the Commonwealth Games

The women's javelin throw event at the 1938 British Empire Games was held on 10 February at the Sydney Cricket Ground in Sydney, Australia.

== Results ==
Rank	Name	Nationality	Result	Notes
1st place, gold medalist(s)	Robina Higgins	Canada	125 ft 7 1/4 in (38.28 m)	GR
2nd place, silver medalist(s)	Antonia Robertson	South Africa	121 ft 4 in (36.98 m)	
3rd place, bronze medalist(s)	Gladys Lunn	England	119 ft 5 1/2 in (36.41 m)	
4	Mary Mitchell	New Zealand	118 ft 0 5/8 in (35.98 m)	
5	Elsie Jones	Australia	101 ft 8 in (30.99 m)	
6	Lena Mitchell	Australia	100 ft 3 3/5 in (30.57 m)	
7	Clarice Kennedy	Australia	97 ft 3 3/4 in (29.66 m)	
	Yvonne Dingley	Canada	DNS	
	Dorothy Odam	England	DNS	
