= Graham Quinn (athlete) =

New Zealand sprinter (1912–1987)

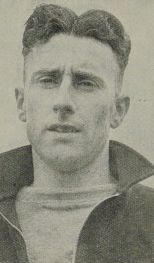
- Quinn, c. 1937

Personal information
- Born: Graham Henry Quinn; 8 July 1912 Gisborne, New Zealand
- Died: 13 November 1987 (aged 75) Auckland, New Zealand
- Occupation: Meat inspector

Sport
- Country: New Zealand
- Sport: Athletics

Achievements and titles
- National finals: 100 yd champion (1938); 220 yd champion (1936, 1938)
Medal record
Men's Athletics
Representing New Zealand
Commonwealth Games
Bronze medal – third place	1938 Sydney	4 x 440 yards Relay

Graham Henry Quinn (8 July 1912 – 13 November 1987) was a New Zealand track and field athlete who won a bronze medal at the 1938 British Empire Games.

== Early life and family ==
Born in Gisborne on 8 July 1912, Quinn was the son of John Richard Quinn and Eleanor Clare Quinn (née Buchanan).

== Athletics ==
Quinn won three New Zealand national athletics titles: the 100 yards sprint in 1938; and the 220 yards in 1936 and 1938.

At the 1938 British Empire Games in Sydney, Quinn competed in the 100 yards sprint, in which he finished fifth in his heat and did not progress further. In the men's 220 yards sprint, he placed second in his heat and fifth in his semi-final, and did not progress to the final. He was a member of the New Zealand men's 4 x 440 yards relay team—with Arnold Anderson, Alan Sayers, and Harold Tyrie—that won the bronze medal.

== Later life and death ==
A meat inspector, Quinn served as a gunner with the New Zealand Artillery in the 2nd New Zealand Expeditionary Force during World War II, and took part in a military sports meeting in New Caledonia in May 1943. He died on 13 November 1987, and was buried at Māngere Lawn Cemetery.
