= Athletics at the 1938 British Empire Games – Women's 80 metres hurdles =

Women's 80 metres hurdles at the Commonwealth Games

The women's 80 metres hurdles event at the 1938 British Empire Games was held on 10 and 12 February at the Sydney Cricket Ground in Sydney, Australia.

== Medalists ==
Gold	Silver	Bronze
Barbara Burke; South Africa	Isabel Grant; Australia	Rona Tong; New Zealand

== Results ==
=== Heats ===
Qualification: First 3 in each heat (Q) qualify directly for the final.

Rank	Heat	Name	Nationality	Time	Notes
1	1	Barbara Burke	South Africa	11.9	Q
2	1	Rona Tong	New Zealand	??.?	Q
3	1	Clarice Kennedy	Australia	12.2e	Q
4	1	Nell Gould	Australia	??.?	
5	1	Ethel Raby	England	??.?	
1	2	Isabel Grant	Australia	12.1	Q
2	2	Thelma Peake	Australia	12.5e	Q
3	2	Kathleen Tiffen	England	13.0e	Q
4	2	Yvonne Dingley	Canada	??.?	

=== Final ===
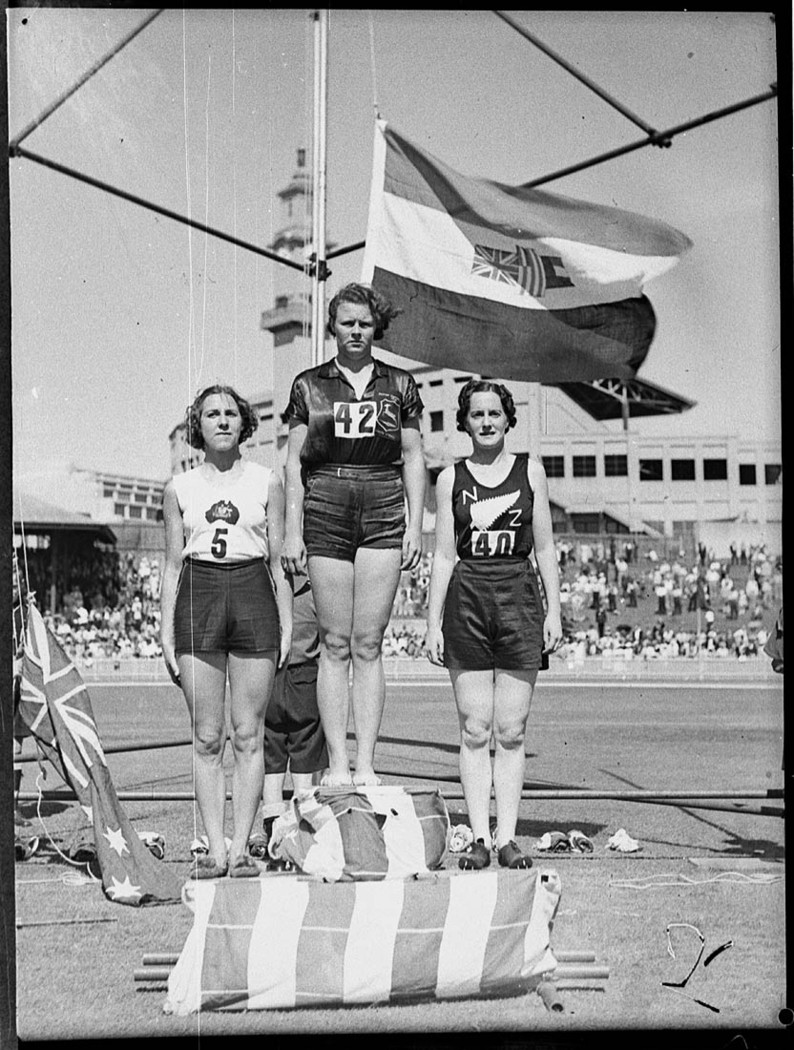
The medal winners

Rank	Name	Nationality	Time	Notes
1st place, gold medalist(s)	Barbara Burke	South Africa	11.7 (w)	GR
2nd place, silver medalist(s)	Isabel Grant	Australia	11.7e (w)	Inches behind
3rd place, bronze medalist(s)	Rona Tong	New Zealand	11.8e (w)	1 yard behind
4	Clarice Kennedy	Australia	??.? (w)	
5	Thelma Peake	Australia	??.? (w)	
6	Kathleen Tiffen	England	??.? (w)	
