= Winifred Lawrence =

New Zealand swimmer

Winifred Lawrence MNZM
Personal information
- Born: Winifred Tweedie Dunn; 6 January 1920 Dunedin, New Zealand
- Died: 22 December 2006 (aged 86) Auckland, New Zealand
- Spouse: Clynton John Christie Lawrence (m. 1946; died 2001)

Sport
- Country: New Zealand
- Sport: Swimming

Achievements and titles
- National finals: 100 yards breaststroke champion (1939, 1940, 1941); 220 yds breaststroke champion (1938, 1939, 1940, 1941)
- Personal best: 100 m breaststroke – 1:31.4

Winifred Tweedie Lawrence MNZM (née Dunn; 6 January 1920 − 22 December 2006) was a New Zealand breaststroke swimmer, who, as Winnie Dunn, represented her country at the 1938 British Empire Games.

== Early life and family ==
Born in Dunedin on 6 January 1920, Lawrence was the youngest daughter of Edward Hanratty Dunn and Ellen Clarke Dunn (née Ferguson). She was educated at King Edward Technical High School. On 30 January 1946, she married Clynton John Christie Lawrence in Dunedin.

== Swimming career ==
Dunn first came to national attention in 1935, when she broke the New Zealand 100 metres breaststroke record, previously held by Gladys Pidgeon, with a time of 1:39.6. The record was later broken by Judith Webster of Auckland, but Dunn regained the record in December 1937 with a time of 1:33.0. She also broke the national 220 yard breaststroke record, swimming 3:22.6, and was subsequently selected to represent New Zealand in the 220 yards breaststroke at the 1938 British Empire Games in Sydney. She went on to finish seventh in that event. She was also a member of the New Zealand 3 x 110 yard medley relay team at the Sydney games, alongside Mona Leydon and Joyce Macdonald, that finished in fifth place with a time of 4:22.3.

Dunn was the New Zealand 220 yards breaststroke champion every year from 1938 to 1941, and the 100 yards breastroke champion from 1939 to 1941.

In 1939, Dunn broke the New Zealand 400 metres breaststroke record by 45.2 seconds, recording a time of 7 minutes 11 seconds. She also held the New Zealand 100 metres breaststroke record, with a time of 1:31.4, for 14 years, until it was broken by Rae Currie in 1954.

As Winifred Lawrence, she became a well-known swimming coach in Auckland over many decades, retiring in 2002.

== Honours ==
In the 2000 Queen's Birthday Honours, Lawrence was appointed a Member of the New Zealand Order of Merit, for services to swimming. In 2001 she was made a life member of the Auckland Swimming Association.

== Death ==
Lawrence was widowed by the death of her husband in 2001. She died on 22 December 2006, and her ashes were buried in Waikumete Cemetery.
