= Roy Taylor (cyclist) =

New Zealand cyclist (1916–1987)

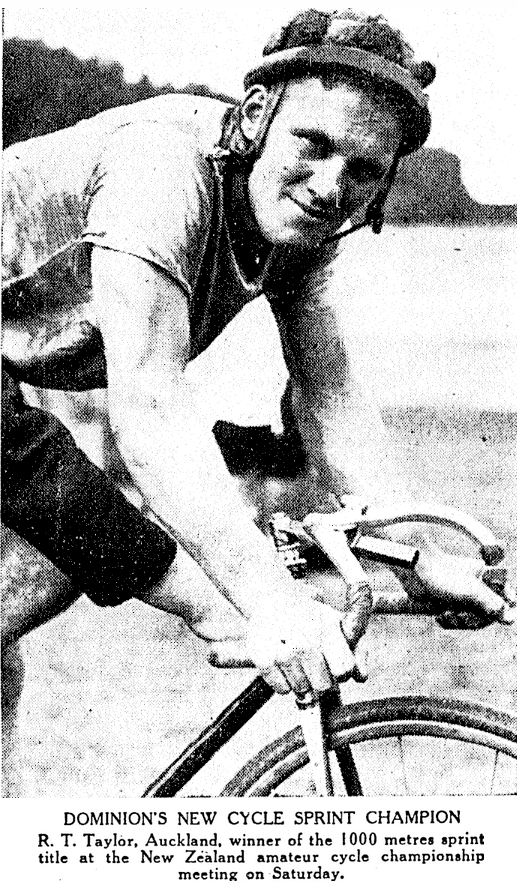

Personal information
- Full name: Royston Thompson Taylor
- Born: 21 July 1916 Auckland, New Zealand
- Died: 7 January 1987 (aged 70)
- Height: 1.73 m (5 ft 8 in)

Sport
- Country: New Zealand
- Sport: Cycling
- Club: Papatoetoe Amateur Athletic and Cycling Club

Royston Thompson Taylor (21 July 1916 – 7 January 1987) was a New Zealand track cyclist who represented his country at the 1938 British Empire Games.

== Early life and family ==
Born in the Auckland suburb of Remuera on 21 July 1916, Taylor was the son of Benjamin and Nellie Taylor.

== Sport ==
=== Cycling ===
A member of the Papatoetoe Amateur Athletic and Cycling Club, Taylor won the 1000 m sprint at the trials to select the cycling team for the 1938 British Empire Games, beating 1936 Olympic representative George Giles in the final. However, at the Empire Games in Sydney, Taylor was unplaced in the sprint, while Giles won the bronze medal. Taylor also competed in the 1 km time trial at the Sydney games, finishing in seventh place.

=== Rugby League ===
In 1938 Taylor debuted for the Newton Rangers in the Fox Memorial Shield first grade competition in Auckland. He scored eight tries for them during the season with the first coming in an 8-7 win over Richmond Rovers on April 23.

== Death ==
Taylor died on 7 January 1987.
