= Athletics at the 1938 British Empire Games – Women's high jump =

Women's high jump at the Commonwealth Games

The women's high jump event at the 1938 British Empire Games was held on 12 February at the Sydney Cricket Ground in Sydney, Australia.

== Results ==
Rank	Name	Nationality	Result	Notes
1st place, gold medalist(s)	Dorothy Odam	England	5 ft 3 in (1.60 m)	GR
2nd place, silver medalist(s)	Dora Gardner	England	5 ft 2 in (1.57 m)	
3rd place, bronze medalist(s)	Betty Forbes	New Zealand	5 ft 2 in (1.57 m)	
4	Margaret Bell	Canada	5 ft 2 in (1.57 m)	
5	Doris Carter	Australia	5 ft 1 in (1.55 m)	
6	Elsie Poore	Australia	4 ft 8 in (1.42 m)	
7	Isabel Miller	Canada	4 ft 6 in (1.37 m)	
	Decima Norman	Australia	DNS	
	Yvonne Dingley	Canada	DNS	
