= Alexander Haire =

Northern Irish athlete

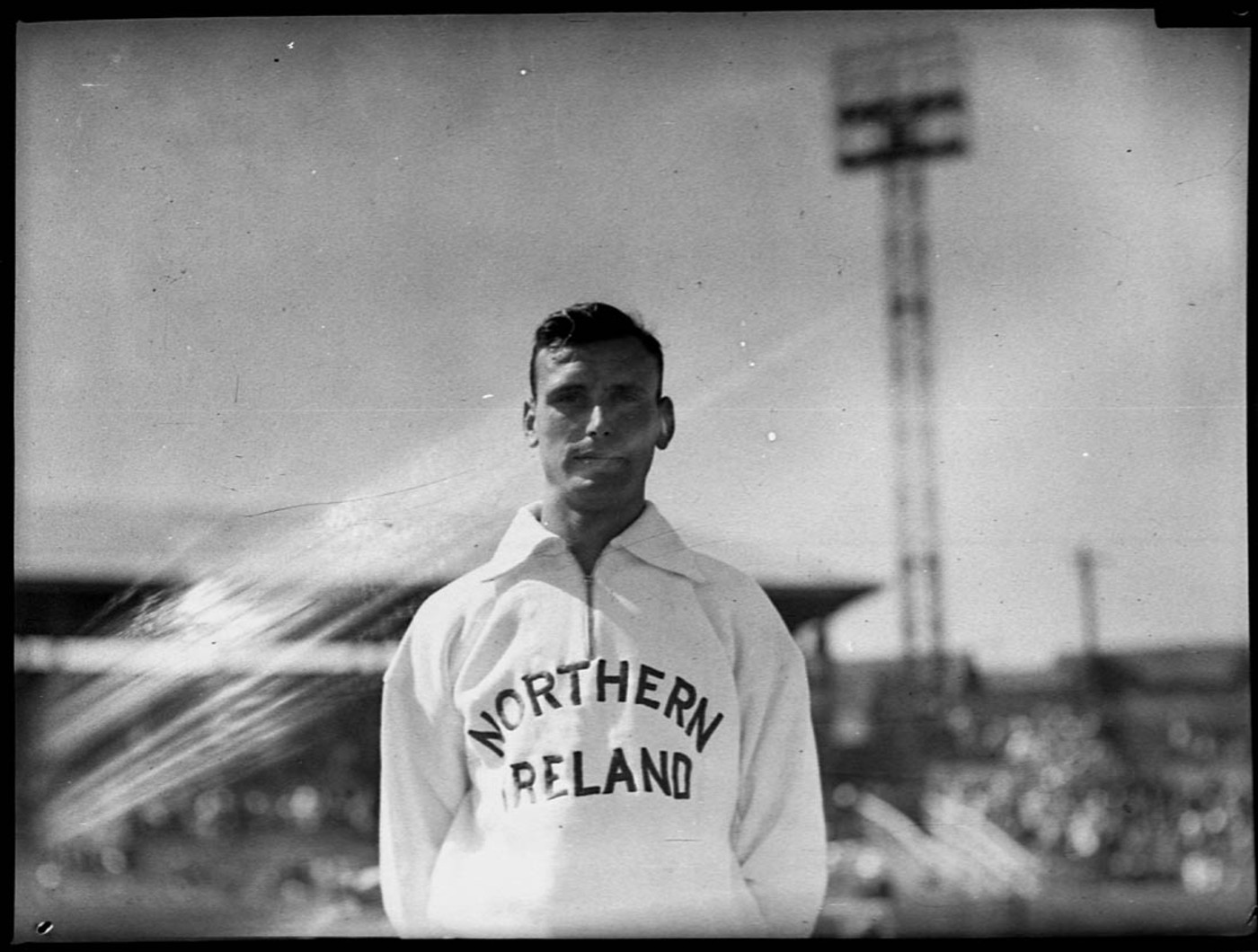
- Photo of a Northern Irish athlete at the 1938 Empire Games (believed to be Alexander Haire)

Personal information
- Nationality: British (Northern Irish)
- Born: c.1915

Sport
- Sport: Athletics
- Event: Middle distance
- Club: Royal Ulster Constabulary

Alexander Haire (c.1915 – date of death unknown) was a Northern Irish athlete who competed in the 1938 British Empire Games.

== Biography ==
Haire ran for the athletics team of the Royal Ulster Constabulary. In 1936 he held the British police title and in 1937 became the champion of Ireland over the 1 mile at the Irish Athletics Championships.

In 1938, he took part in the New South Wales half-mile championship in preparation for the Empire Games. He was one of only four athletes to represent Northern Ireland at the 1938 British Empire Games, partly due to a time of political change that saw the Irish Free State recently becoming Ireland. He took part in the athletics programme and specifically in the 880 yards competition. At the time of the Games he was a RUC constable and lived at 18 Gainsborough Drive, Belfast.

After his return from Sydney he competed for Northern Ireland against the Free State AAA in July 1938.

Haire became champion of Ireland a second time in 1939, winning the 880 yards at the Irish Athletics Championships. World War II effectively finished his career as a runner, although he remained involved in athletics in an administration capacity, being the assistant treasuer for the Northern Ireland AAA.
