= Athletics at the 1938 British Empire Games – Men's 2 miles walk =

The men's 2 miles walk event at the 1938 British Empire Games was held as an invitation event on 7 February at the Sydney Cricket Ground in Sydney, Australia. It was the first time that race walking was held at the Games, although unofficially, and the sport would not return to it until 1966.

== Results ==
Rank	Name	Nationality	Time	Notes
1st place, gold medalist(s)	Athol Stubbs	Australia	13:51.4	
2nd place, silver medalist(s)	R. Stephenson	Australia	??:??.?	250 yards behind
3rd place, bronze medalist(s)	W. Hayward	Australia	??:??.?	20 yards behind
