= Joyce Macdonald =

New Zealand swimmer (1922–2003)

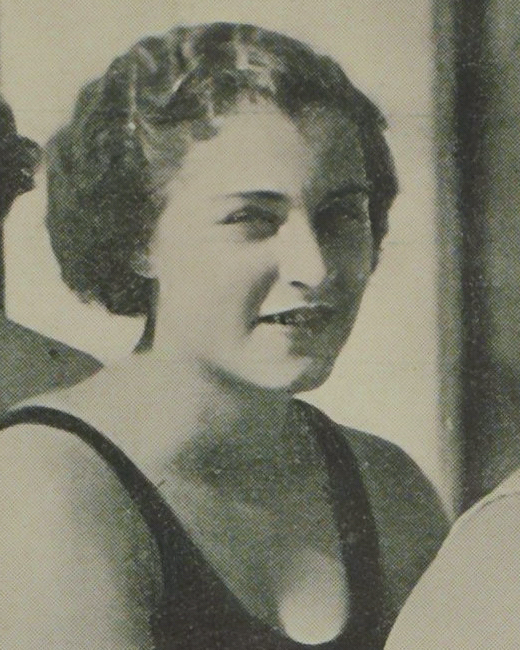
- Macdonald in 1938

Personal information
- Birth name: Alice Joyce Macdonald
- Born: 24 February 1922; Invercargill, New Zealand
- Died: 3 August 2003 (aged 81); Invercargill, New Zealand
- Spouse: Douglas Stretton Walker

Sport
- Country: New Zealand
- Sport: Swimming

Achievements and titles
- National finals: 100 yards backstroke champion (1939, 1940, 1941); 200 m backstroke champion (1939, 1940, 1941)

Alice Joyce Walker (née Macdonald, 24 February 1922 − 3 August 2003) was a New Zealand backstroke swimmer, who, as Joyce Macdonald, represented her country at the 1938 British Empire Games.

== Biography ==
Born on 24 February 1922, Macdonald was from Invercargill. She came to national attention as a 15-year-old in 1937 when she broke her own national intermediate girls' record for the 100 yards backstroke with a time of 1:17.8, which was only 1.4 seconds slower than the senior record for the event, held by Ena Stockley.

She was selected to swim for New Zealand in the 110 yards backstroke at the 1938 British Empire Games in Sydney, becoming the first Empire Games representative from Southland. She began well in her heat, being in second place at the turn, but faded in the second half of the race to finish in a time of 1:28.6 and did not qualify for the final. Macdonald also competed in the 3 x 110 yards medley relay at the Sydney games, alongside Winnie Dunn and Mona Leydon, with the trio recording 4:22.3 in finishing fifth.

In March 1938, Macdonald broke Ena Stockley's national 100 yards backstroke record at Gisborne, recording 1:16.2. Later that year, in November, she broke the New Zealand 200 m backstroke record, previously held by Marie Farquhar of Auckland, with a time of 3:10.0. In January 1939, she swam the 100 metres backstroke in 1:22.0, breaking the previous record held by Ena Stockley by 2.4 seconds. In February 1940, Macdonald became the first New Zealand woman to swim 200 metres backstroke in under three minutes, with a time of 2:56.8.

Macdonald won the 100 yards and 200 metres backstroke titles at the New Zealand national championships in 1939, 1940 and 1941.

After World War II, Macdonald married Douglas Stretton Walker; he died in 1989. Joyce Walker died on 3 August 2003.
