= Lloyd Miller (athlete) =

Personal information
- Born: 26 August 1915
- Died: 6 January 1985 (aged 69)
Medal record
Men's athletics
Representing Australia
British Empire Games
Silver medal – second place	1938 Sydney	Triple jump

Lloyd Miller (26 August 1915 – 6 January 1985) was an Australian athlete who competed in the 1938 British Empire Games.

In 1938 he won the silver medal in the triple jump event at the Empire Games.
