= Harcourt Godfrey =

New Zealand wrestler

Personal information
- Birth name: Harcourt Richard Godfrey
- Born: 26 February 1905
- Died: 19 August 1980 (aged 75)
- Occupation: Police officer
- Spouse: Daphne Thelma Wilton (m. 1927)

Sport
- Country: New Zealand
- Sport: Wrestling

Achievements and titles
- National finals: Heavyweight champion (1933); Middleweight champion (1937, 1938)

Harcourt Richard Godfrey (26 February 1905 – 19 August 1980) was a New Zealand wrestler who represented his country at the 1938 British Empire Games.

== Biography ==
Born on 26 February 1905, Godfrey was the son of Richard Harcourt Godfrey and Clara Godfrey (née Muldrock). On 5 July 1927, he married Daphne Thelma Wilton at St Paul's Methodist church, Palmerston North.

Godfrey won the New Zealand amateur heavyweight wrestling title in 1933. In 1937 and 1938, he won the national amateur middleweight title.

At the 1938 British Empire Games in Sydney, Godfrey competed in the freestyle wrestling middleweight (82 kg) division, finishing in fourth place.

Godfrey died on 19 August 1980, and he was buried at Aramoho Cemetery, Whanganui.
