= Jack Davies (swimmer) =

New Zealand swimmer

Personal information
- Full name: John Cecil Wright Davies
- Born: 12 December 1916 Hāwera, New Zealand
- Died: 25 July 1997 (aged 80)
- Education: New Plymouth Boys' High School; University of Otago
- Occupation: Dental surgeon

Sport
- Country: New Zealand
- Sport: Swimming

Achievements and titles
- National finals: 220 yards breaststroke champion (1938, 1939)
- Personal best: 220 yd breaststroke – 3:00.2

John Cecil Wright Davies (12 December 1916 – 25 July 1997) was a New Zealand swimmer who represented his country at the 1938 British Empire Games.

== Early life and family ==
Born in Hāwera on 12 December 1916, Davies was the son of Alfred Davies and Clara Bertha Davies (née Larsen).

Davies was educated at New Plymouth Boys' High School, where he was a prefect, and went on to study dentistry at the University of Otago, graduating BDS in 1939.

== Swimming ==
In 1937, Davies won the 220 yards breaststroke title at the inter-university Easter Tournament in Christchurch, breaking the existing record by 11 seconds, and was awarded a New Zealand University swimming blue. The following year, he won another New Zealand university swimming title and gained another swimming blue at Easter Tournament. At Easter Tournament in 1939, Davies again won the 220 yards breaststroke title, and equalled the national record of 3:00.2, and he was subsequently awarded another New Zealand University blue for swimming.

Davies won two New Zealand national swimming titles: the 220 yards breaststroke in 1938 and 1939.

He represented New Zealand in the men's 220 yards breaststroke at the 1938 British Empire Games in Sydney, but finished fourth in his heat, recording a time of 3:10.4, and did not progress to the final.

== Military service ==
In August 1940, Davies was commissioned as a lieutenant in the New Zealand Dental Corps (NZDC), and was appointed as the dental officer at the Mobilisation Camp at Trentham. The following year, he was transferred to the Royal New Zealand Naval Volunteer Reserve, resigning his commission with the NZDC and being recommissioned as a surgeon lieutenant (D) to serve in HMNZS Leander. Davies received the War Medal 1939–1945 and the New Zealand War Service Medal.

== Later life and death ==
Following World War II, Davies practised as a dental surgeon in Hamilton, and served as the vice president and then president of the Waikato Bay of Plenty branch of the New Zealand Dental Association (NZDA) between 1948 and 1950, and the regional delegate on the board of the NZDA from 1954 to 1958.

Davies died on 25 July 1997, and he was buried at Hamilton Park Cemetery.
