= Jack Morgan (athlete) =

New Zealand discus thrower

Personal information
- Born: John Douglas Morgan; 29 November 1907 Wellington, New Zealand
- Died: 25 August 1967 (aged 59) London, England
- Spouse: Beatrice May Cole (m. 1928)

Sport
- Country: New Zealand
- Sport: Athletics

Achievements and titles
- National finals: Discus champion (1939)

John Douglas Morgan (29 November 1907 – 25 August 1967) was a New Zealand track and field athlete who represented his country at the 1938 British Empire Games. He later became a successful athletics coach.

== Early life and family ==
Born in Wellington on 29 November 1907, Morgan was the son of John Stanley Morgan and Emma Ethel Morgan (née Sauvarin). On 29 November 1928 he married Beatrice May Cole, and they had two children.

== Athletics ==
At the 1938 British Empire Games in Sydney, Morgan finished eighth in the men's discus, with a best throw of 119 ft 11 1/2 in (36.56 m).

Representing West Coast North Island, Morgan won the New Zealand national discus title in 1939, recording a best distance of 129 ft 4 in (39.42 m).

Morgan later took up coaching, specialising in sprinting and hurdling. He trained athletes including Peter Henderson, Avis McIntosh and Brenda Matthews.

== Later life and death ==
A glass worker by trade, Morgan died in London on 25 August 1967.
