= Gwen Rix =

New Zealand diver

Gwen Squire
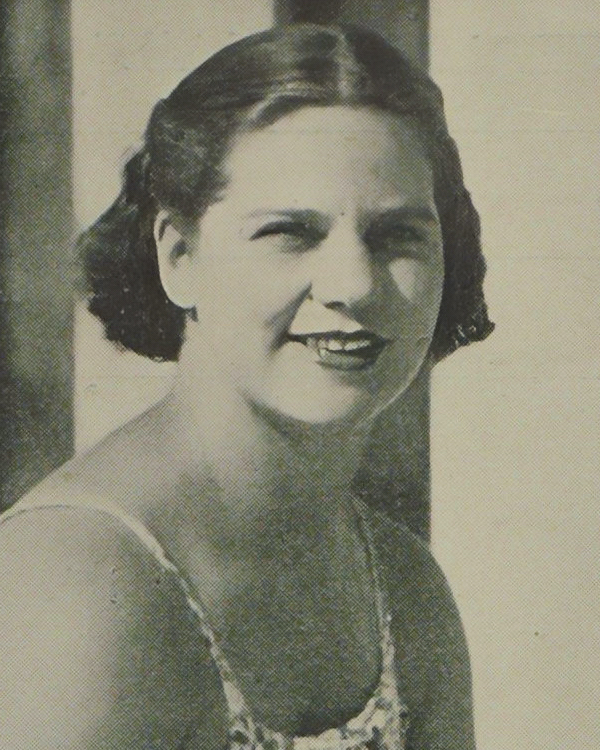
- Rix in 1938

Personal information
- Birth name: Alma Gwen Rix
- Born: 1 April 1918; Dunedin, New Zealand
- Died: 30 April 2000 (aged 82)
- Spouse: Arthur William Squire (m. 1945; died 1988)

Sport
- Country: New Zealand
- Sport: Diving

Achievements and titles
- National finals: Diving champion (1936, 1938, 1939, 1940, 1941)

Alma Gwen Squire (née Rix, 1 April 1918 − 30 April 2000) was a New Zealand diver, who represented her country at the 1938 British Empire Games.

== Early life and family ==
Born Alma Gwen Rix, Squire was born in Dunedin, New Zealand, on 1 April 1918, the daughter of Edwin Montague Rix and Ella Mable Rix (née Miller). Her father, a tramway motorman, died in 1925. She was educated at King Edward Technical College, where she was an accomplished netball player. On 26 December 1945, she married Arthur William Squire in Christchurch.

== Swimming and diving ==
Beginning her aquatic career as a swimmer, Rix competed at the 1931 junior amateur swimming championships in the 50 yards and 100 yards freestyle events. The following year, she was second in the breaststroke at the national junior championships.

Rix began diving in 1934 and benefitted from coaching by Australian Harry Tickle when he toured New Zealand that same year. At the 1935 national championships, Rix was second in the women's diving. She went on to win the New Zealand national diving championship every year from 1936 to 1941, apart from 1937, when the event was not held.

Considered unlucky by some not to have been selected for the 1936 Olympics, Rix competed for New Zealand at the 1938 British Empire Games in Sydney, where she finished sixth in the women's 3 m springboard.

== Death ==
Squire died on 30 April 2000, and her ashes were buried at the Woodlawn Memorial Gardens in Christchurch. Her husband had predeceased her in 1988.
