= Theo Allen =

New Zealand middle-distance runner

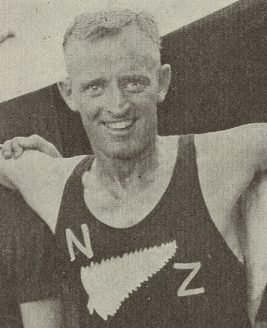
- Allen in 1941

Personal information
- Full name: Theodore Allen
- Born: 22 February 1914 Dunedin, New Zealand
- Died: 16 November 2003 (aged 89) Perth, Western Australia, Australia
- Spouse: Heather Margaret Constance Macdonald

Sport
- Country: New Zealand
- Sport: Athletics

Achievements and titles
- National finals: 880 yards champion (1937)

Theodore Allen (22 February 1914 – 16 November 2003) was a New Zealand middle-distance runner, who represented his country at the 1938 British Empire Games in Sydney, New South Wales.

== Biography ==
Born in Dunedin in 1914, Allen was the son of Theodore Allen and his wife Hester Ann Watkins. He was the New Zealand 880 yards champion in 1937, in a time of 1:55.8.

At the 1938 British Empire Games in Sydney, Allen won the first heat of the 880 yards in an Australian record time, before his compatriot Pat Boot won the second heat in a time 2.2 seconds faster than Allen's. In the final, Boot won the gold medal, while Allen finished in fifth place. In the 1 mile event, Allen finished fourth in his heat, but in the final he did not finish, withdrawing from the race at the half-way point.

During World War II, Allen was a second lieutenant in the New Zealand Railway Operating Group. He died in Perth, Western Australia in 2003.
