= Len Newell =

New Zealand swimmer

Personal information
- Full name: William Leonard James Newell
- Born: 13 July 1913 Christchurch, New Zealand
- Died: 17 August 1994 (aged 81) Christchurch, New Zealand

Sport
- Country: New Zealand
- Sport: Swimming

Achievements and titles
- National finals: 440 yards freestyle champion (1936, 1938, 1940)

William Leonard James Newell (13 July 1913 – 17 August 1994) was a New Zealand swimmer who represented his country at the 1938 British Empire Games.

== Biography ==
Born in Christchurch on 13 July 1913, Newell was the son of William Newell and Eliza Lewis Newell (née Richards).

Newell won the 440 yards freestyle title at the New Zealand national swimming championships, representing Canterbury, in 1936, 1938, and 1940.

He represented New Zealand in the men's 440 yards and 1650 yards freestyle events at the 1938 British Empire Games in Sydney. He finished seventh in his heat of the 440 yards, and did not progress to the final, while in his heat of the 1650 yards he retired.

Newell died in Christchurch on 17 August 1994, and his ashes were buried at Woodlawn Memorial Gardens in the suburb of Linwood.
