= Torsten Anderson =

New Zealand wrestler (1904–1986)

Tom Anderson
Personal information
- Birth name: Torsten Reinhold Andersson
- Born: 9 February 1904; Sollefteå, Sweden
- Died: 19 December 1986 (aged 82); Christchurch, New Zealand
- Spouse: Irene Cory (m. 1934)

Sport
- Country: New Zealand
- Sport: Wrestling

Torsten Reinhold "Tom" Anderson (né Andersson; 9 February 1904 – 19 December 1986) was a New Zealand wrestler who represented his country at the 1938 British Empire Games.

== Biography ==
Born in Sollefteå, Sweden, on 9 February 1904, Anderson was the son of Johan Reinhold Andersson and Fanny Sofia Hägglund.

Anderson began wrestling in 1925 when he met Anton Koolmann at the latter's newly established wrestling school in Sydney, Australia. The pair would later reconnect in Wellington after both had moved to New Zealand.

Anderson became a naturalised New Zealand citizen on 12 January 1938, less than a month before the 1938 British Empire Games in Sydney. At those games, he competed in the freestyle wrestling light-heavyweight (90 kg) division, finishing in fourth place.

Anderson died in Christchurch on 19 December 1986, and he was buried at Memorial Park Cemetery, Christchurch.
