= Leo Nolan (wrestler) =

New Zealand wrestler

Personal information
- Born: Leo Thomas Nolan; 10 December 1911
- Died: 27 January 1979 (aged 66)

Sport
- Country: New Zealand
- Sport: Wrestling

Achievements and titles
- National finals: Bantamweight champion (1933, 1934, 1935, 1937, 1938); Flyweight champion (1935); Lightweight champion (1936)

Leo Thomas Nolan (10 December 1912 – 27 January 1979) was a New Zealand wrestler who represented his country at the 1938 British Empire Games.

== Biography ==
Born on 10 December 1911, Nolan was the son of Thomas Nolan and Evelyn Beatrice Nolan (née Williams).

Representing Wellington, Nolan won several New Zealand amateur wrestling titles: he was the bantamweight champion in 1933, 1934, 1935, 1937 and 1938; the flyweight champion in 1935; and the lightweight champion in 1936.

At the 1938 British Empire Games in Sydney, Nolan competed in the freestyle wrestling bantamweight (57 kg) division. In the preliminary rounds, he defeated the Australian, Ted Purcell (who went on to win the gold medal), by one fall; but lost to Englishman Ray Cazaux (the eventual bronze medalist) by one fall. In the semi-finals, Nolan was defeated by the Canadian competitor, Vernon Blake, and finished in fourth place.

During World War II, Nolan served as a driver in the 2nd New Zealand Expeditionary Force.

Nolan died on 27 January 1979, and he was buried at Paraparaumu Cemetery.
