= Howard Benge =

New Zealand rower

Personal information
- Born: Howard Wilson Benge; 26 July 1913
- Died: 19 May 1986 (aged 72)
- Occupation: Builder

Sport
- Sport: Rowing
- Club: Union Boat Club, Wanganui
Medal record
Representing New Zealand
Men's rowing
British Empire Games
| Bronze medal – third place | 1938 Sydney | Eight |

Howard Wilson Benge (26 July 1913 – 19 May 1986) was a New Zealand rower who won a bronze medal representing his country at the 1938 British Empire Games.

== Biography ==
Born on 26 July 1913, Benge was the son of Annie Elizabeth Benge (née Wilson) and her husband, George Frederick Benge.

He won the bronze medal at the 1938 British Empire Games as part of the men's eight. He was a member of the Union Boat Club (UBC) in Wanganui; fellow UBC members in the eight were James Gould and Gus Jackson.

Benge died on 19 May 1986, and was buried in Aramoho Cemetery, Wanganui.
