= Les Pithie =

New Zealand rower (1908–1980)

Personal information
- Born: Leslie Edward Pithie; 7 July 1908 Sawyers Bay, New Zealand
- Died: 31 January 1980 (aged 71) Torquay, Victoria, Australia
- Weight: 70 kg (154 lb)
- Spouse: Gwendoline Williams (m. 1940)

Sport
- Country: New Zealand
- Sport: Rowing
- Club: Port Chalmers Rowing Club
Medal record
Representing New Zealand
Men's rowing
British Empire Games
Bronze medal – third place	1938 Sydney	Eight

Leslie Edward Pithie (7 July 1908 – 31 January 1980) was a New Zealand rower who won a bronze medal for his country at the 1938 British Empire Games.

== Early life and family ==
Born at Sawyers Bay near Dunedin on 7 July 1908, Pithie was the son of Frederick Pithie and Margaret Elizabeth Pithie (née Riddell). He was educated at Otago Boys' High School. In 1938, he became engaged to Gwendoline Williams of Hawthorn, Victoria, Australia, and the couple married on 27 November 1940 at the Presbyterian church in the Melbourne suburb of Toorak.

== Sporting career ==
=== Rowing ===
A member of the Port Chalmers Rowing Club, Pithie was included in the Otago provincial rowing eight from 1934 to 1937, and was a South Island rowing representative in the eight in 1937. At the 1938 British Empire Games in Sydney, Pithie was the bow in the New Zealand men's eight that won the bronze medal, finishing two lengths behind the second-placed Australian crew.

=== Other sports ===
In Dunedin, Pithie played rugby union for the Pirates Football Club. He was a member of the Otago water polo team at the 1928 New Zealand national championships.

== Military service ==
Pithie was commissioned in the 1st Otago Regiment in 1930, serving until 1936 when he was posted to the reserve of officers. Following the outbreak of World War II, he enlisted in the Royal Australian Air Force in Melbourne, but later returned to New Zealand where he joined the 2nd New Zealand Expeditionary Force. In April 1941, he was posted to the 7th Officer Cadet Training Unit, and was a platoon commander in the force sent to garrison Fiji that year. There he was promoted from lieutenant to captain, and he was appointed liaison officer for the brigade at divisional headquarters when he returned to New Zealand. He later served as adjutant of the advance party in New Caledonia, before attending Staff College in New Zealand. In September 1943, he rejoined the division at Vella Lavella as divisional intelligence officer. In December 1943, he was promoted to the rank of major and appointed brigade major to the 14th Brigade, serving in that role during the Battle of the Green Islands.

== Other activities ==
In 1940, Pithie filed a patent application for a mascara applicator, and a US patent, number US2271034A, was granted on 27 January 1942.

== Death ==
Pithie died in Torquay, Victoria on 31 January 1980.
