= William Stodart =

New Zealand rower

Personal information
- Born: William Swan Stodart; 31 March 1904
- Died: 22 January 1990 (aged 85)

Sport
- Country: New Zealand
- Sport: Rowing
- Club: Union Boat Club, Whanganui
Medal record
Men's rowing
Representing New Zealand
British Empire Games
Bronze medal – third place	1938 Sydney	Eight

William Swan Stodart (31 March 1904 – 22 January 1990) was a New Zealand rowing coxswain. At the 1938 British Empire Games he won the bronze medal as part of the men's eight.
