= John Charters =

New Zealand rower

Personal information
- Born: John Godfrey Charters; 25 October 1913
- Died: 16 January 1995 (aged 81)

Sport
- Sport: Rowing
Medal record
Men's rowing
Representing New Zealand
British Empire Games
Bronze medal – third place	1938 Sydney	Eight

John Godfrey Charters (25 October 1913 – 16 January 1995) was a New Zealand rower.

He won the bronze medal at the 1938 British Empire Games as part of the men's eight.
