= Doris Strachan =

New Zealander athlete

Doris Aikenhead
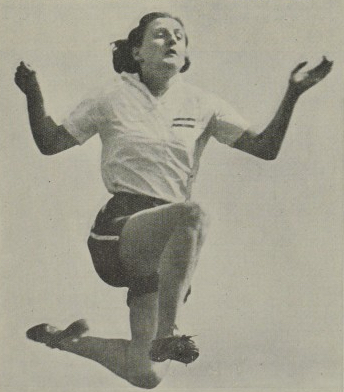

Personal information
- Born: Doris Louisa Strachan; 13 January 1917 Timaru, New Zealand
- Died: 12 November 1974 (aged 57)
- Spouse: Andrew Aikenhead

Sport
- Country: New Zealand
- Sport: Athletics

Doris Louisa Aikenhead (née Strachan, 13 January 1917 – 12 November 1974) was a New Zealand track and field athlete who represented her country at the 1938 British Empire Games.

== Early life and family ==
Born Doris Louisa Strachan in Timaru on 13 January 1917, Aikenhead was the daughter of Julia McInnes Strachan (née Crisp) and James Dunn Strachan. She went on to marry Andrew Aikenhead.

== Athletics ==
At an athletics meeting at Temuka on 30 November 1935, Strachan broke the New Zealand national women's long jump record, recording a distance of 17 ft 1 1/2 in (5.22 m).

At the trials held in Wellington in December 1937 for the New Zealand team to travel to the 1938 British Empire Games, Strachan's winning distance in the long jump was 17 ft 7 1/4 in (5.37 m), and she was duly selected for the team. At the 1938 British Empire Games in Sydney, she was eliminated in the heats of the women's 100 yards and 220 yards sprints, and finished sixth in the women's long jump with a best leap of 17 ft 3/4 in (5.20 m). She was also a member of the New Zealand trio that finished fourth in the women's 440 yards relay.

== Death ==
Aikenhead died on 12 November 1974, and she was buried at Oamaru Lawn Cemetery.
