= Bob Smith (rower) =

New Zealand rower

Bob Smith MM
Personal information
- Full name: Robert Benedict Seymour Smith
- Born: 15 April 1909
- Died: 13 January 1993 (aged 83)

Sport
- Sport: Rowing
Medal record
Men's rowing
Representing New Zealand
British Empire Games
Bronze medal – third place	1938 Sydney	Double Sculls
Bronze medal – third place	1938 Sydney	Single Sculls

Robert Benedict Seymour Smith MM (15 April 1909 – 13 January 1993) was a New Zealand rower.

At the 1938 British Empire Games he won two bronze medals: one in the men's double sculls alongside Gus Jackson; and one in the men's single sculls.

During World War II, Smith served with the 2nd New Zealand Expeditionary Force. In January 1943 he was awarded the Military Medal in recognition of gallant and distinguished services in the Middle East. In June 1943 he was commissioned as a 2nd lieutenant in the New Zealand Engineers.
