= Thelma Peake =

Australian track and field athlete

Personal information
- Born: Thelma Mason; 30 April 1914
- Died: 15 June 1982 (aged 68)
Medal record
Women's athletics
Representing Australia
British Empire Games
Gold medal – first place	1938 Sydney	4×110/220 yd
Bronze medal – third place	1938 Sydney	Long Jump

Thelma Peake (née Mason, 30 April 1914 – 15 June 1982) was an Australian track and field athlete who won gold and bronze medals at the 1938 British Empire Games in Sydney.

Peake won three successive Long Jump National Championships during the 1930s, but also competed in sprints, hurdles and middle-distance events. At the 1938 Empire Games she was a member of the Australian relay team which won the gold medal in the 220-110-220-110 yards event. In the long jump competition she won the bronze medal and in the 80 metre hurdles contest she finished fifth. In the 100 yards event she was disqualified in the semi-finals.

== See also ==
- Australian athletics champions (Women)
