= Mary Mitchell (athlete) =

New Zealand athlete (1912–2007)

Mary Logan
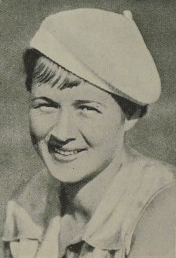

Personal information
- Born: Mary Jane Mitchell; 26 November 1912 New Zealand
- Died: 26 March 2007 (aged 94) Dargaville, New Zealand

Sport
- Country: New Zealand
- Sport: Athletics

Achievements and titles
- National finals: Javelin champion (1939, 1940, 1941)

Mary Jane Logan (née Mitchell; 26 November 1912 – 26 March 2007) was a New Zealand athlete. Mainly remembered as a javelin thrower, she represented her country at the 1938 British Empire Games in Sydney, where she finished fourth in the women's javelin with a best throw of 118 feet 1/2 inch (35.98 m).

In 1939, she won the inaugural women's javelin throw at the New Zealand athletics championships, with a winning distance of 111 feet 6 1/2 inches (34.00 m). She won the national title again in 1940 and 1941, and her distance of 122 feet 6 inches (37.34 m) in 1940 remained the championship record until surpassed by Cleone Rivett-Carnac in 1952. At the Auckland women's championships in 1941, Mitchell broke her own New Zealand record with a throw of 125 feet 8 inches (38.30 m). She also at one time held the New Zealand women's long jump record, and was a competent high jumper, winning the Auckland championship in 1936.

Mitchell was also known for her kauri carving, as an artist, a poet and a horsewoman. She died in Dargaville in 2007.
