= Gerald Backhouse =

Australian middle-distance runner

Medal record

Men's athletics

Representing Australia

British Empire Games
| Silver medal – second place | 1938 Sydney | 1 mile |

Gerald Ian d'Acres Backhouse (6 December 1912 – 28 December 1941) was an Australian athlete who competed in the 1936 Summer Olympics.

In 1936 he finished eighth in the Olympic 800-metre event. In the 1500 metre competition he was eliminated in the first round.

At the 1938 Empire Games he won the silver medal in the 1 mile contest. In the 880 yards event he finished seventh.

During World War II Gerald Backhouse was a sergeant in the Royal Australian Air Force, serving on attachment with the Royal Air Force. He died in a practice bombing flight in England on 28 December 1941. He was buried at Sulloth (Causeway Head) Cemetery, Holme Low, Cumberland, England.
