= James Gould (rower) =

New Zealand rower

Personal information
- Born: 1 February 1914
- Died: 25 August 1997 (aged 83)

Sport
- Sport: Rowing
- Club: Union Boat Club, Wanganui
Medal record
Men's rowing
Representing New Zealand
British Empire Games
Bronze medal – third place	1938 Sydney	Eight

James Reuben Gould (1 February 1914 – 25 August 1997) was a New Zealand rower.

He won a bronze medal at the 1938 British Empire Games as part of the men's eight. He was a member of the Union Boat Club (UBC) in Wanganui; fellow UBC members in the eight were Gus Jackson and Howard Benge.
