= Doreen Lumley =

New Zealand sprinter (1921–1939)

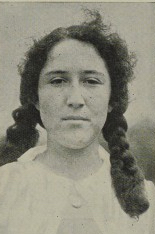
Lumley, c. 1937

Doreen Lumley (21 August 1921 – 1 October 1939) was a New Zealand sprinter of the 1930s from Auckland.

Doreen Lumley represented New Zealand in the 1938 British Empire Games in the 100 yard and 220 yard events.

Doreen and her sister, Bernice, were educated at Auckland Girls' Grammar School, taking part in athletics, basketball, swimming and tennis; and then worked as shorthand-typists.

The sisters were killed in a road accident in Auckland when the small car that they were in collided with a truck. Their deaths shocked New Zealand, and resulted in widespread grief across the nation. They were buried together at Waikumete Cemetery in Glen Eden.
