= Gus Jackson =

New Zealand rower (1903–1968)

Personal information
- Born: 25 December 1903
- Died: 12 November 1968 (aged 64)

Sport
- Sport: Rowing
- Club: Union Boat Club, Wanganui
Medal record
Men's rowing
Representing New Zealand
British Empire Games
Bronze medal – third place	1938 Sydney	Eight
Bronze medal – third place	1938 Sydney	Double Sculls

Augustus Kenneth George Jackson (25 December 1903 – 12 November 1968) was a New Zealand rower.

He won two bronze medals at the 1938 British Empire Games, winning one as part of the men's eight and another bronze medal alongside Bob Smith in the men's double sculls. He was a member of the Union Boat Club (UBC) in Wanganui; fellow UBC members in the eight were James Gould and Howard Benge.
