= George Giles (cyclist) =

New Zealand racing cyclist

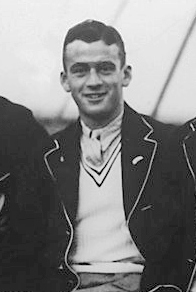
- Giles in 1936

Personal information
- Full name: George Robert Bayne Giles
- Born: 21 December 1913 Wanganui, New Zealand
- Died: 11 July 1973 (aged 59) Wanganui, New Zealand

Cycling career
- Sport: Cycling
- Disciplines: Track, road
Medal record
Representing New Zealand
British Empire Games
Bronze medal – third place	1938 Sydney	Sprint

George Robert Bayne Giles (21 December 1913 – 11 July 1973) was a New Zealand track and road cyclist. He was a New Zealand's leading track cyclist of the 1930s and held several national titles in 1936–38: the national sprint, time trial third time in succession, and 10-mile title.

Giles was born in Christchurch where he worked in a cycle shop, then as a barman at a hotel. After being initially overlooked for selection due to his times not being "up to the required standard", he represented New Zealand at the 1936 Summer Olympics at Berlin in the sprint, 1000 m time trial, and in the road race. At the 1938 British Empire Games in Sydney he won the bronze medal in the sprint and placed ninth in the time trial.

He died suddenly in Wanganui on 11 July 1973 aged 59, leaving a wife and four sons.
