= Stan Lay =

New Zealand javelin thrower

Stan Lay MBE
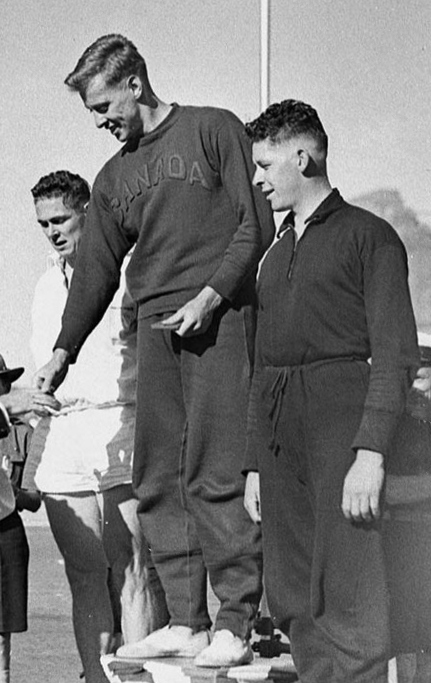
- Lay (right) at the 1938 British Empire Games

Personal information
- Born: Stanley Arthur Lay; 27 July 1906 New Plymouth, New Zealand
- Died: 12 May 2003 (aged 96) New Plymouth, New Zealand
- Height: 1.78 m (5 ft 10 in)

Sport
- Sport: Athletics
- Event: Javelin throw
- Club: Wanganui Taranaki

Achievements and titles
- Personal best: 67.89 m (1928)
Medal record
Representing New Zealand
Commonwealth Games
Gold medal – first place	1930 Hamilton	Javelin throw
Silver medal – second place	1938 Sydney	Javelin throw

Stanley Arthur Lay MBE (27 July 1906 – 12 May 2003) was a New Zealand javelin thrower who competed at the 1928 Summer Olympics, 1930 British Empire Games, 1938 British Empire Games, and 1950 British Empire Games.

== Biography ==
Lay won the British AAA Championships title in the javelin throw event at the 1928 AAA Championships. Shortly afterwards he represented Great Britain at the 1928 Olympic Games in Amsterdam, Netherlands, where he finished seventh in the javelin.

Lay's best throw of 67.89 m was achieved in London on 7 July 1928 prior to the 1928 Olympics. Officials thought he had broken the world record, but they had overlooked Eino Penttilä's record throw of 69.88 the previous year. Lay's throw remained the Commonwealth record for 26 years.

He represented New Zealand at the 1930 British Empire Games, where he won a gold medal. He later won a silver in 1938, and placed sixth in 1950.

Lay was a signwriter at Stratford, and could not afford the time off to go to the 1934 British Empire Games in London. At the 1950 Empire Games Lay took the oath on behalf of all competitors.

In the 1988 New Year Honours, Lay was appointed a Member of the Order of the British Empire, for services to sport. Two years later he was inducted into the New Zealand Sports Hall of Fame.
