= Alan Geddes =

New Zealand athlete (1912–1993)

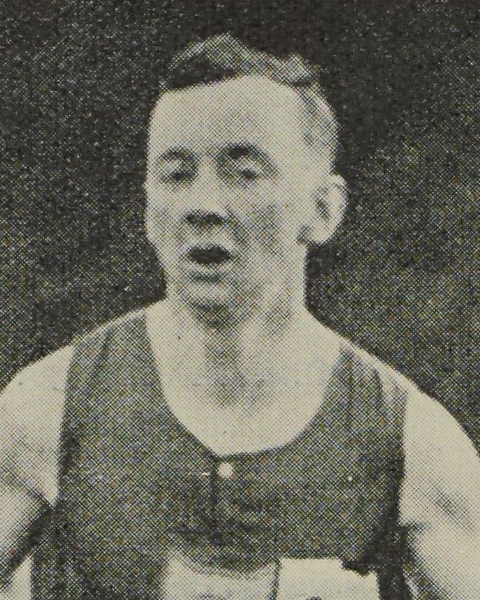
- Geddes, c. 1937

Personal information
- Full name: Alan Raymond Geddes
- Born: 7 August 1912 New Zealand
- Died: 27 January 1993 (aged 80) Dunedin, New Zealand
- Spouse: Flora Margaret Dorward Pyott (m. 1939)

Sport
- Country: New Zealand
- Sport: Athletics

Achievements and titles
- National finals: 1 mile champion (1945)

Alan Raymond Geddes (7 August 1912 – 27 January 1993) was a New Zealand athlete. He represented his country at the 1938 British Empire Games in Sydney, finishing seventh in the 3-mile race and fourth in the 6-mile event. He placed second in the New Zealand cross-country championship on four occasions, but never won the event. In 1945 he won the 1-mile title at the New Zealand athletics championships, in a time of 4:30.2.

On 26 October 1939, Geddes married Flora Margaret Dorward Pyott at First Church, Dunedin. He died at Dunedin Hospital in 1993.
