= David Young (discus thrower) =

Scottish discus thrower

Personal information
- Nationality: British (Scottish)
- Born: c.1914 Shotts, Scotland
- Died: 1983 (aged 69)

Sport
- Sport: Athletics
- Event: Discus throw
- Club: Shettleston Harriers; Glasgow Police AC
Medal record
Representing Scotland
British Empire Games
Silver medal – second place	1938 Sydney	Discus

David Young (c.1914 – 1983) was a Scottish athlete who specialised in the discus throw and won a silver medal at the 1938 British Empire Games.

== Biography ==
Young, a Glasgow police officer by profession, was a member of a Harriers club in Shettleston and the Glasgow Police Athletic Club.

Self coached, Young won his first Scottish Championship for discus in 1937 and the following year representing Scotland at the 1938 British Empire Games claimed a silver medal at the British Empire Games in Sydney, which was Scotland's only medal of the athletics competition. At the time of the 1938 Games he was a constable and lived at 40 Whitehill Street, Dennistoun, Glasgow. Whitehill Street, Dennistoun

After the Empire Games, Young finished second behind Adolfo Consolini in the discus throw event at the 1938 AAA Championships and set a British record of 153.8 ft in winning the Scottish Championships in 1938.

The war and personal tragedy limited Young's sporting career. He had to raise five children on his own after his first two wives both died young. After the war, he became an inspector in the traffic department of the police force.
