= Rona Tong =

New Zealand track and field athlete

Rona McCarthy MBE
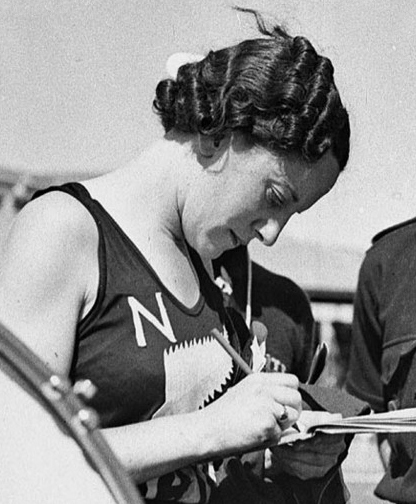
- Tong at the 1938 British Empire Games

Personal information
- Born: Rona Iris Tong; 22 August 1916 Hastings, New Zealand
- Died: 31 January 2016 (aged 99) Havelock North, New Zealand
- Spouse: Leslie James McCarthy (m. 1939; died 1993)

Sport
- Country: New Zealand
- Sport: Athletics
- Events: Sprint, hurdles

Achievements and titles
- National finals: 80 yards hurdles champion (1937)
Medal record
Representing New Zealand
Commonwealth Games
Bronze medal – third place	1938 Sydney	80 yd Hurdles

Rona Iris McCarthy MBE (née Tong, 22 August 1916 – 31 January 2016) was a New Zealand track and field athlete who won a bronze medal at the 1938 British Empire Games.

== Early life and family ==
Born in Hastings on 22 August 1916, McCarthy was the daughter of funeral director Charles Oswald Tong and Florence Susannah Tong (née Jarden). She was educated at Hastings High School and then worked in the dressmaking trade. On 7 November 1939 she married Leslie James McCarthy at St Matthew's Church, Hastings, and the couple went on to have one daughter.

== Athletics ==
She won the New Zealand national 80 yards hurdles title in 1937, and went on to represent her country in the same event at the British Empire Games in Sydney the following year. She finished third in the final, 0.1 seconds behind the winner, Barbara Burke from South Africa. Competing in the 100 yards sprint at the same games, McCarthy finished last in her heat and did not progress.

== Other sports ==
McCarthy represented Hawke's Bay in both netball and basketball and was selected to play for New Zealand. However, planned internationals against Australia never took place. She coached both netball and basketball for almost 40 years, and was made a life member of the Hastings Netball Umpires' Association in 1967. She later took up lawn bowls, and served as president of the Kia Toa Bowling Club in Hastings.

== Honours ==
In the 1979 Queen's Birthday Honours, McCarthy was appointed a Member of the Order of the British Empire, for services to sport, especially netball. She was inducted into the Hawke's Bay sporting legends hall of fame in 2007.

== Later life and death ==
McCarthy was widowed by the death of her husband in 1993. She died in Havelock North on 31 January 2016, and was buried at Hastings Cemetery.
