= Milton Wallace =

Canadian long-distance runner

Personal information
- Born: 2 January 1912 Toronto, Ontario, Canada
- Died: 20 April 1995 (aged 83) Toronto, Ontario, Canada

Sport
- Sport: Long-distance running
- Event: 5000 metres

Thomas Milton Wallace (2 January 1912 – 20 April 1995) was a Canadian long-distance runner. He competed in the men's 5000 metres at the 1936 Summer Olympics.
