= William Roberts (athlete) =

English sprinter (1912–2001)

Personal information
- Nationality: British (English)
- Born: 5 April 1911 Salford, England
- Died: 5 December 2001 (aged 90) Timperley, England
- Height: 173 cm (5 ft 8 in)
- Weight: 70 kg (154 lb)

Sport
- Sport: Athletics
- Event: 400 m/440 y
- Club: Salford Harriers
Medal record
Men's athletics
Representing Great Britain
Olympic Games
Gold medal – first place	1936 Berlin	4 × 400 metres
European Athletics Championships
Silver medal – second place	1946 Oslo	4 × 400 metres
Representing England
British Empire Games
Gold medal – first place	1938 Sydney	440 yards
Silver medal – second place	1934 London	440 yards
Silver medal – second place	1938 Sydney	4 × 440 yards

William Roberts (5 April 1911 – 5 December 2001) was an English sprinter and winner of gold medal in 4 × 400 m relay for Great Britain at the 1936 Summer Olympics.

== Biography ==
Born in Salford, Lancashire, Roberts competed for England at the 1934 British Empire Games, finishing second in 440 yd (400 m) behind Godfrey Rampling. The following year, Roberts became the national 440 yards champion after winning the British AAA Championships title at the 1935 AAA Championships.

At the 1936 Olympic Games in Berlin, Roberts just missed the medal in the individual 400-metre event, finishing fourth in the final, and ran the third leg in the gold medal-winning British 4 × 400 m relay team.

Roberts won another 440 yards AAA title at the 1937 AAA Championships and then Roberts turned Empire Games silver into the gold medal at the next British Empire Games in 1938 in Sydney, Australia. He also won a silver in 4 × 440 yd relay event and finished sixth in the 220 yards contest.

After World War II and service in the RAF, Roberts returned to athletics, finishing second behind Arthur Wint in the 440 yards event at the 1946 AAA Championships and then winning a silver medal as a member of British 4 × 400 m relay team at the 1946 European Championships.

At the 1948 Summer Olympics, Roberts was chosen as Great Britain's athletics team captain, but he was eliminated in the heats of the 400-metre event and anchored the British relay team to a fourth place in their heat of the 4 × 400-metre competition.

After his retirement from athletics in 1949, he worked as a columnist for the Manchester Evening News. William Roberts died in Timperley, Manchester, aged 90.

== Competition record ==
Year	Competition	Venue	Position	Event	Notes
Representing Great Britain
1948	Olympics	London, England	4th, Heat 2, Round 2	400 m	48.6
