= George Sutherland (athlete) =

Canadian hammer thrower

Medal record

Men's athletics

Representing Canada

British Empire Games
Gold medal – first place	1938 Sydney	Hammer throw
Silver medal – second place	1934 London	Hammer throw
Bronze medal – third place	1938 Sydney	Discus throw

George Watt Sutherland (7 May 1903 – 10 May 1951) was a Canadian all-round track and field athlete. He was the hammer throw gold medallist at the 1938 British Empire Games. He also took a bronze medal in the discus throw at the same competition. He had been the runner-up in the hammer in 1934 British Empire Games.

He was born to Donald Mowat Sutherland in Edinburgh, Scotland and later migrated to Canada. He died in Alberta, Canada and his wife, Audrey Ameila Banister, outlived him by over thirty years.

Sutherland represented Canada internationally at the British Empire Games in a wide variety of events. On his first appearance at the inaugural 1930 British Empire Games he failed to post a mark in the discus and hammer, but managed fourth place in the triple jump. At the following edition in 1934 he entered five events – all the throws and also the triple jump. He ranked in the top eight in discus and shot put and came away with his first major medal with a silver in the hammer throw. At his third a final outing at the 1938 Sydney Games he entered three throwing events. He became the hammer throw champion with a games record throw of 48.71 m (159 ft 9 1/2 in) and took a discus bronze as well. He ranked eighth in the shot put.

He was inducted into the Canadian Olympic Hall of Fame in 1956 and into the Alberta Sports Hall of Fame in 1958. He was a four-time winner of the hammer throw at the Canadian Track and Field Championships and also won national titles in the shot put and javelin throw. He also won 35 regional Alberta championship titles during his career.

== National titles ==
- Canadian Track and Field Championships
  - Hammer throw: 1931, 1932, 1934, and 1937
  - Javelin throw: 1931
  - Shot put: 1937

== International competitions ==
Year	Competition	Venue	Position	Event	Notes
1930	British Empire Games	Hamilton, Canada	4th	Triple jump	13.75 m
1930	British Empire Games	Hamilton, Canada	—	Discus throw	NM
1930	British Empire Games	Hamilton, Canada	—	Hammer throw	NM
1934	British Empire Games	London, United Kingdom	—	Triple jump	NM
1934	British Empire Games	London, United Kingdom	8th	Shot put	?
1934	British Empire Games	London, United Kingdom	7th	Discus throw	?
1934	British Empire Games	London, United Kingdom	—	Javelin throw	DNS
1934	British Empire Games	London, United Kingdom	2nd	Hammer throw	46.24 m
1938	British Empire Games	Sydney, Australia	8th	Shot put	11.99 m
1938	British Empire Games	Sydney, Australia	3rd	Discus throw	41.47 m
1938	British Empire Games	Sydney, Australia	1st	Hammer throw	48.71 m GR
