= Mona Leydon =

New Zealand swimmer

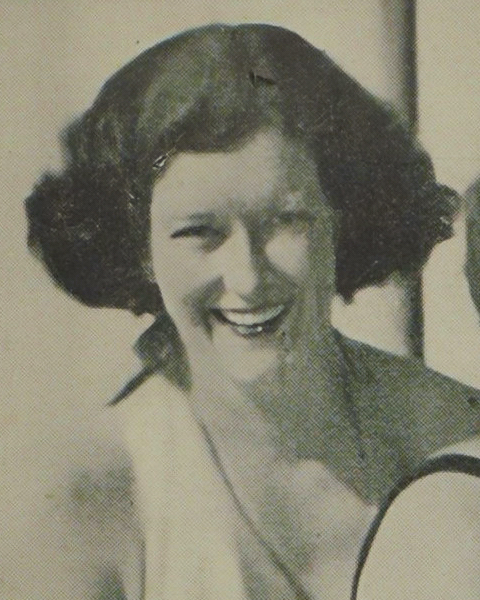
- Leydon in 1938

Personal information
- Born: 22 January 1915
- Died: 2 April 2002 (aged 87)
Medal record
Women's swimming
Representing New Zealand
British Empire Games
Bronze medal – third place	1938 Sydney	440 yards Freestyle

Monica Annie Leydon-Smith (22 January 1915 – 2 April 2002) was a New Zealand swimming representative. She represented New Zealand at the 1938 British Empire Games where she won the bronze medal in the women's 440 yards freestyle.
