= Pat Boot =

New Zealand middle-distance runner

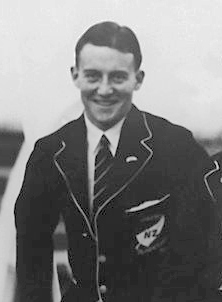
- Boot on the decks of Wanganella in 1936

Personal information
- Born: Vernon Patrick Boot; 22 October 1914 Kaikōura, New Zealand
- Died: 15 January 1947 (aged 32) Gisborne, New Zealand
- Education: Canterbury Agricultural College
- Height: 1.79 m (5 ft 10 in)
- Weight: 73 kg (161 lb)
- Spouse: Lorna Hinepare Kessell (m. 1940; died 1943)

Sport
- Country: New Zealand
- Sport: Athletics
- Club: Canterbury

Achievements and titles
- National finals: 880 yards champion (1936, 1938, 1939, 1940); 1 mile champion (1936)
- Personal bests: 800 m – 1:50.5 (1938); Mile – 4.12.6 (1938)
Medal record
Representing New Zealand
British Empire Games
Gold medal – first place	1938 Sydney	880 yards
Bronze medal – third place	1938 Sydney	1 mile

Vernon Patrick Boot (22 October 1914 – 15 January 1947) was a New Zealand middle-distance runner who represented his country at the 1936 Summer Olympics and at the 1938 British Empire Games, winning gold and bronze medals at the latter.

== Early life and family ==
Born in Kaikōura on 22 October 1914, Boot was the son of Percy Vernon Boot and Estelle Marie Boot (formerly England, née Edge). He was educated at Ashburton High School and Timaru Boys' High School, and went on to study at Canterbury Agricultural College from 1934 to 1935, where he trained for a diploma in agriculture. In 1937, Boot joined the Department of Agriculture as an assistant fields instructor.

On 23 March 1940, Boot married Lorna Hinepare Kessell at St Peter's Church, Wellington. Lorna Boot died from meningitis on 15 September 1943 while her husband was serving overseas during World War II.

== Athletics ==
As a schoolboy at Timaru Boys' High School, Boot ran the 880 yards in 2:00.0, and the 1 mile in 4:26.8.

Boot competed at the 1936 Summer Olympics in Berlin in the men's 800 metres, finishing last in his semi-final. Like his teammate, Cecil Matthews, he suffered tendon problems from running on the decks of the Wanganella en route to the games, and was below his best form. He withdrew from the fourth heat of the 1500 metres.

At the 1938 British Empire Games in Sydney, Boot won the gold medal in the men's 880 yards with a tremendous sprint 70 yards from the end. His time of 1:51.2 was an Empire Games and Australian record. In the 1 mile, he won the bronze medal, finishing six yards behind the winner, Jim Alford of Wales.

Boot won five New Zealand national athletics titles: the 880 yards in 1936, 1938, 1939, and 1940; and the 1 mile in 1936.

== Military service ==
In World War II, Boot trained as an officer at the Army Training School at Trentham. He went overseas with the 2nd New Zealand Expeditionary Force not long after his marriage, and served in the Middle East and Italy. Rising to the rank of captain, Boot suffered from jaundice while serving in Italy in 1944, and in 1945, after his return to New Zealand, he was accidentally badly scalded.

== Death ==
Boot was an instructor in agriculture at Gisborne when he died on 15 January 1947 when under anaesthesia for dental treatment. He was buried at Taruheru Cemetery, Gisborne.
