= Henry Pack =

English sprinter

Personal information
- Born: 30 October 1912

Sport
- Sport: Athletics
- Event: 440 yards
- Club: City of London Police AC
Medal record
Men's Athletics
Representing England
British Empire Games
Silver medal – second place	1938 Sydney	4×440 yd

Henry Edward Pack (born 30 October 1912, date of death unknown) was an English athlete who competed in the 1938 British Empire Games.

== Biography ==
At the 1938 Empire Games he was a member of the England relay team which won the silver medal in the 4×440 yards event. In the 440 yards competition he was eliminated in the heats.

In 1939, Pack won the silver medal in the 440 yards at the prestigious AAA Championships.
