= Betty Forbes =

New Zealand high jumper

Betty Taylor
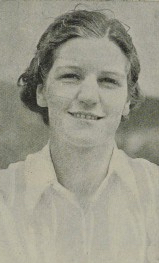
- Forbes, c. 1937

Personal information
- Born: Elizabeth Madge Forbes; 27 December 1916
- Died: 29 August 2002 (aged 85)
- Spouse: George Taylor

Sport
- Country: New Zealand
- Sport: Athletics

Achievements and titles
- National finals: High jump champion (1939, 1940, 1941)
Medal record
Women's Athletics
Representing New Zealand
British Empire Games
Bronze medal – third place	1938 Sydney	High Jump

Elizabeth Madge Taylor (née Forbes; 27 December 1916 – 29 August 2002) was a New Zealand track and field athlete who competed at the 1938 British Empire Games, where she won the bronze medal in the women's high jump.

== Early life and family ==
Born on 27 December 1916, Forbes was the daughter of Alexander Forbes and Elizabeth Herries Forbes (née McKenzie). She was educated at Waitaki Girls' High School in Oamaru.

== Athletics ==
Forbes came to national attention in 1933, when her application for the New Zealand women's high jump record, with a jump of 4 ft 8 3/4 in (1.44 m) was declined as the certificates were not received in time by the Council of the New Zealand Amateur Athletics Association (NZAAA). However, the following year, she recorded a height of 4 ft 9 1/2 in (1.46 m) at Dunedin on 3 February 1934 that was duly recognised as a national record.

In February 1936, Forbes bettered her New Zealand record at the Otago track and field championships with a jump of 4 ft 11 in (1.50 m), but once again the NZAAA refused to ratify it as the application for the record was out of time. She went on to increase the record to 4 ft 11 1/2 in (1.51 m), and then broke the five-foot barrier with a leap of 5 ft 3/16 in (1.53 m) at Dunedin in November 1937.

At the national trials in December 1937 for the New Zealand team to compete at the 1938 British Empire Games, Forbes increased her national mark by 1/16 in (0.2 cm), recording a height of 5 ft 1/4 in (1.53 m), and she was subsequently confirmed in the team for the games in Sydney. At those games, Forbes won the bronze medal in the women's high jump, with a height of 5 ft 2 in (1.57 m), 1 inch (2.5 cm) behind the gold medal winner, Dorothy Odam from England.

Forbes went on to win the New Zealand national high jump title in 1939, 1940 and 1941.

== Later life and death ==
Forbes married George Taylor. She died on 29 August 2002.
