= John Loaring =

Canadian hurdler and sprinter (1915–1969)

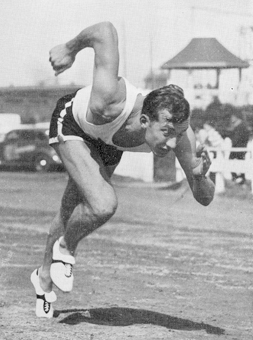

Personal information
- Full name: John Wilfrid Loaring
- Nickname: Johnny
- Born: August 3, 1915 Winnipeg, Manitoba
- Died: November 21, 1969 (aged 54) Windsor, Ontario
Medal record
Men's athletics
Representing Canada
Olympic Games
| Silver medal – second place | 1936 Berlin | 400 m hurdles |
British Empire Games
| Gold medal – first place | 1938 Sydney | 440 yd hurdles |
| Gold medal – first place | 1938 Sydney | 4×110 yards |
| Gold medal – first place | 1938 Sydney | 4×440 yards |

John Wilfred Loaring (August 3, 1915 – November 21, 1969) was a Canadian athlete who competed in the 1936 Summer Olympics.

He was born in Winnipeg, Manitoba and died in Windsor, Ontario.

In 1936 he won the silver medal in the 400 metre hurdles event. In the 400 metre competition he finished sixth. He was also a member of the Canadian relay team which finished fourth in the 4×400 metre contest.

At the 1938 Empire Games he won the gold medal in the 440 yards hurdles event. He also won the gold medal with the Canadian team in the 4×110 yards relay competition as well as in the 4×440 yards relay contest. In the 440 yards event he finished fifth.

On November 20, 1969, Loaring died of cancer at age 54.

In 2015, Loaring was posthumously inducted into the Canada's Sports Hall of Fame.

In 2017, the Windsor Open Track and Field Meet was renamed the Johnny Loaring Classic in order to recognize Loaring's contributions to the sport of athletics and the Community.
