= Bill Dale (athlete) =

Canadian athlete (1917–2010)

Medal record

Men's Athletics

Representing Canada

British Empire Games
Gold medal – first place	1938 Sydney	4×440 yards
Bronze medal – third place	1938 Sydney	880 yards

William Atheling Dale (March 29, 1917 – May 4, 2010) was a Canadian athlete who competed in the 1938 British Empire Games.

Dale was born in Morse, Saskatchewan. At the 1938 Empire Games he was a member of the Canadian relay team that won the gold medal in the 4×440 yards event. He won the bronze medal in the 880 yards competition.

Dale competed for the Washington State Cougars track and field team in the NCAA. He helped recruit Bill Parnell to the school as well.
