= Scotty Rankine =

Canadian long-distance runner

Medal record

Men's athletics

Representing Canada

British Empire Games
Silver medal – second place	1934 London	6 miles
Silver medal – second place	1938 Sydney	6 miles
Bronze medal – third place	1938 Sydney	3 miles

Robert Scade "Scotty" Rankine (January 6, 1909 – January 10, 1995) was a Canadian athlete who competed in the 1932 Summer Olympics and in the 1936 Summer Olympics.

He was born in Hamilton, South Lanarkshire, United Kingdom of Great Britain and Ireland and died in Wasaga Beach, Ontario.

In 1932 he finished eleventh in the Olympic 5000 metre event.

Four years later he was eliminated in the first round of the 5000 metre competition and he did not finish the 10000 metre contest at the 1936 Games.

At the 1934 Empire Games he won the silver medal in the 6 miles event and finished fourth in the 3 miles competition. He won again the silver medal in the 6 miles contest and also a bronze medal in the 3 miles event at the 1938 Empire Games.
