= Cecil Matthews =

New Zealand long-distance runner

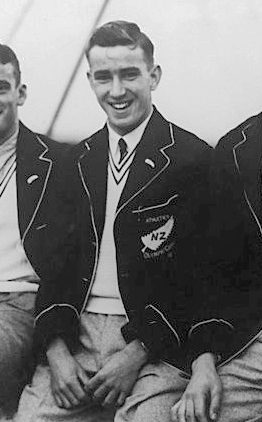
- Matthews on Wanganella in 1936

Personal information
- Born: Cecil Henry Matthews; 13 October 1914 Christchurch, New Zealand
- Died: 8 November 1987 (aged 73) Auckland, New Zealand
- Height: 170 cm (5 ft 7 in)
- Weight: 62 kg (137 lb)

Sport
- Sport: Athletics

Achievements and titles
- National finals: 3 miles champion (1936, 1938)
- Personal bests: 3 miles – 13:59.6 (1938); 6 miles – 30:14.5 (1938)
Medal record
Representing New Zealand
British Empire Games
Gold medal – first place	1938 Sydney	3 miles
Gold medal – first place	1938 Sydney	6 miles

Cecil Henry Matthews (13 October 1914 – 8 November 1987) was a New Zealand long distance runner from Canterbury, who represented New Zealand at the 1936 Summer Olympics at Berlin and New Zealand at the 1938 British Empire Games at Sydney.

At the 1936 Summer Olympics he was eliminated from the 5000 metre event, finishing eighth in his heat, and was scratched from the 10,000 metres. He had tendon problems (like Pat Boot, who also had a disappointing result at Berlin), from running on the decks of the Wanganella.

He then received guidance from the Olympic 1,500 metres winner, Jack Lovelock, and at the 1938 British Empire Games won two gold medals, in the three-mile (5 km) race where he beat Peter Ward, and in the six-mile (10 km) event. He had no prior experience in 6 miles, which did not appear on the New Zealand programme until 1948. Matthews credited his 1938 success to Lovelock.

Matthews twice won the New Zealand national 3 miles title, in 1936 and 1938. He served in the Air Force in World War II, then moved to Auckland where he died.
