= Athletics at the 1938 British Empire Games =

Athletics at the 3rd British Empire and Commonwealth Games
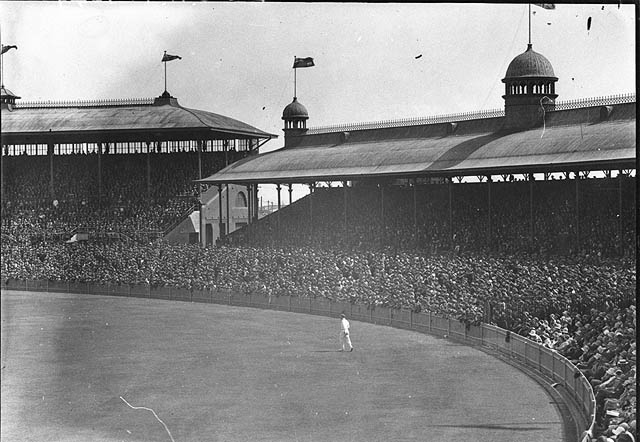
- The events took place with a makeshift track at the cricket ground
- Dates: 5–12 February 1938
- Host city: Sydney, Australia
- Venue: Sydney Cricket Ground
- Level: Senior
- Events: 28
- Participation: 187 athletes from 11 nations

At the 1938 British Empire Games, the athletics events were held at the Sydney Cricket Ground in Sydney, Australia in February 1938, with several events also being held at the Sydney Sports Ground. A total of 28 athletics events were contested at the Games, 20 by men and 8 by women.

== Medal summary ==
=== Men ===
( 'e' denotes an estimated time )

Medallists for men's events, with times, heights and distances; links to event details
Event	Gold		Silver		Bronze	
100 yards	Cyril Holmes (ENG)	9.7	John Mumford (AUS)	9.8e	Ted Best (AUS)	9.9e
220 yards	Cyril Holmes (ENG)	21.2	John Mumford (AUS)	21.3e	Ted Best (AUS)	21.4e
440 yards	Bill Roberts (ENG)	47.9	William Fritz (CAN)	47.9e	Denis Shore (SAF)	48.1e
880 yards	Pat Boot (NZL)	1:51.2	Frank Handley (ENG)	1:54.0e	Bill Dale (CAN)	1:54.2e
1 mile	Jim Alford (WAL)	4:11.6	Gerald Backhouse (AUS)	4:12.2e	Pat Boot (NZL)	4:12.6e
3 miles	Cecil Matthews (NZL)	13:59.6	Peter Ward (ENG)	14:05.4	Scotty Rankine (CAN)	14:24.0e
6 miles	Cecil Matthews (NZL)	30:14.5	Scotty Rankine (CAN)	+180 yds (~30:45)	Wally Hayward (SAF)	+250 yds (~31:28)
Marathon	Johannes Coleman (SAF)	2:30:15	Bert Norris (ENG)	2:37:57	Jackie Gibson (SAF)	2:38:20
120 yards hurdles	Tom Lavery (SAF)	14.0w	Larry O'Connor (CAN)	14.2ew	Sid Stenner (AUS)	14.4ew
440 yards hurdles	John Loaring (CAN)	52.9	John Park (AUS)	54.6e	Alan McDougall (AUS)	55.2e
4 × 110 yards relay	Canada; Jack Brown; Pat Haley; John Loaring; Larry O'Connor	41.6	England; Ken Richardson; Sandy Duncan; Lawrence Wallace; Cyril Holmes	41.8e	Australia; Ted Best; Alf Watson; Ted Hampson; Howard Yates	41.9e
4 × 440 yards relay	Canada; Lee Orr; Bill Dale; William Fritz; John Loaring	3:16.9	England; Frank Handley; Henry Pack; Brian MacCabe; Bill Roberts	3:19.2	New Zealand; Alan Sayers; Arnold Anderson; Graham Quinn; Harold Tyrie	3:22.0
High jump	Edwin Thacker (SAF)	1.96	Robert Heffernan (AUS)	1.88	Doug Shetliffe (AUS)	1.88
Pole vault	Andries du Plessis (SAF)	4.11	Les Fletcher (AUS)	3.97	Stuart Frid (CAN)	3.88
Long jump	Harold Brown (CAN)	7.43	Jim Panton (CAN)	7.25	Basil Dickinson (AUS)	7.15
Triple jump	Jack Metcalfe (AUS)	15.49	Lloyd Miller (AUS)	15.41	Basil Dickinson (AUS)	15.28
Shot put	Louis Fouché (SAF)	14.48	Eric Coy (CAN)	13.95	Francis Drew (AUS)	13.80
Discus throw	Eric Coy (CAN)	44.76	David Young (SCO)	43.04	George Sutherland (CAN)	41.47
Hammer throw	George Sutherland (CAN)	48.71	Keith Pardon (AUS)	45.11	Jim Leckie (NZL)	44.21
Javelin throw	Jim Courtright (CAN)	62.80	Stan Lay (NZL)	62.21	Jack Metcalfe (AUS)	55.53

==== Invitation events ====
Medallists in men's invitation events, with times and/or distances
Event	Gold		Silver		Bronze	
220 yards hurdles	Phillip Sharpley (NZL)	24.7	Alan McDougall (AUS)	+2 yds (~24.9)	Jack Lobban (AUS)	+0.5 yd
2 miles walk	Athol Stubbs (AUS)	13:51.4	R. Stephenson (AUS)	+250 yds (~14:50)	W. Hayward (AUS)	+20 yds

=== Women ===
Medallists for women's events, with times, heights and distances; links to event details
Event	Gold		Silver		Bronze	
100 yards	Decima Norman (AUS)	11.1	Joyce Walker (AUS)	11.3e	Jeanette Dolson (CAN)	11.4e
220 yards	Decima Norman (AUS)	24.7	Jean Coleman (AUS)	25.1e	Eileen Wearne (AUS)	25.3e
80 metres hurdles	Barbara Burke (SAF)	11.7w	Isabel Grant (AUS)	11.7ew	Rona Tong (NZL)	11.8ew
110–220–110 yards relay	Australia; Jean Coleman; Eileen Wearne; Decima Norman	49.1	Canada; Aileen Meagher; Jeanette Dolson; Barbara Howard	49.9e	England; Kathleen Stokes; Dorothy Saunders; Winifred Jeffrey	51.3e
220–110–220–110 yards relay	Australia; Decima Norman; Joan Woodland; Jean Coleman; Thelma Peake	1:15.2	England; Kathleen Stokes; Ethel Raby; Dorothy Saunders; Winifred Jeffrey	1:17.2e	Canada; Violet Montgomery; Barbara Howard; Aileen Meagher; Jeanette Dolson	1:19.0e
High jump	Dorothy Odam (ENG)	1.60	Dora Gardner (ENG)	1.57	Betty Forbes (NZL)	1.57
Long jump	Decima Norman (AUS)	5.80	Ethel Raby (ENG)	5.65	Thelma Peake (AUS)	5.55
Javelin throw	Robina Higgins (CAN)	38.28	Antonia Robertson (SAF)	36.98	Gladys Lunn (ENG)	36.41

== Medal table ==
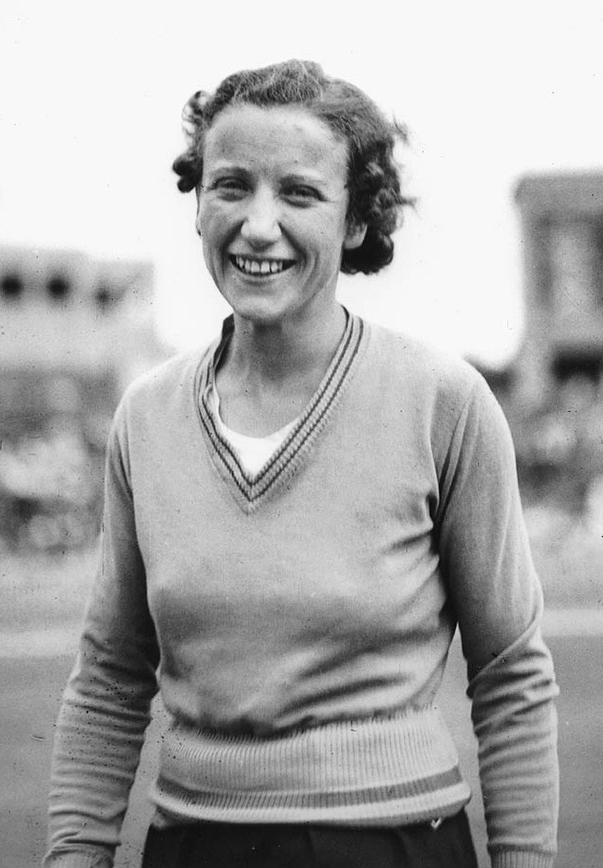
Decima Norman was Australia's most successful athlete of the games with five gold medals.

* Host nation (Australia)

Medals won by nation with totals, ranked by number of golds—sortable
Rank	Nation	Gold	Silver	Bronze	Total
1	Canada (CAN)	8	6	6	20
2	Australia (AUS)*	6	11	12	29
3	South Africa (RSA)	6	1	3	10
4	England (ENG)	4	8	2	14
5	New Zealand (NZL)	3	1	5	9
6	Wales (WAL)	1	0	0	1
7	Scotland (SCO)	0	1	0	1
Totals (7 entries)		28	28	28	84

== Participating nations ==
- Australia (78)
- British Ceylon (4)
- Canada (37)
- England (24)
- New Zealand (19)
- Northern Ireland (3)
- Scotland (4)
- South Africa (12)
- Southern Rhodesia (2)
- Trinidad and Tobago (3)
- Wales (1)
