= Jim Leckie =

New Zealand hammer thrower (1903–1982)

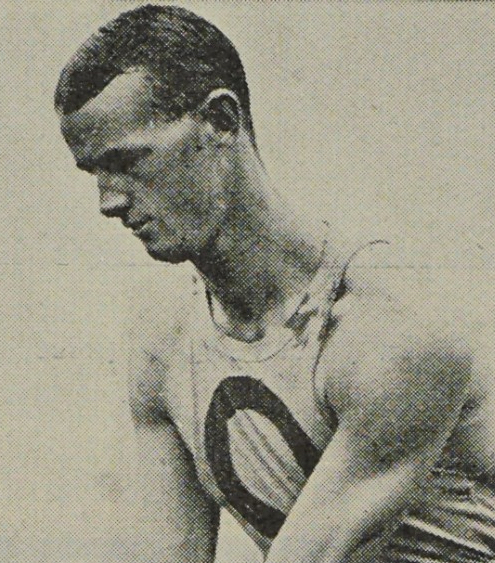
- Leckie, c. 1937

Personal information
- Born: James George Leckie; 9 October 1903 Blueskin Bay, New Zealand
- Died: 25 June 1982 (aged 78) Dunedin, New Zealand
- Occupation: Schoolteacher
- Spouse: Daisy Isabella McIntyre (m. 1934)
- Children: 4

Sport
- Country: New Zealand
- Sport: Athletics

Achievements and titles
- National finals: Hammer throw champion (1932, 1945, 1946, 1948)
Medal record
Men's athletics
Representing New Zealand
Commonwealth Games
Bronze medal – third place	1938 Sydney	Hammer throw

James George Leckie (9 October 1903 – 25 June 1982) was a New Zealand track and field athlete who won a bronze medal at the 1938 British Empire Games.

== Early life and family ==
Born at Blueskin Bay, north of Dunedin, on 9 October 1903, Leckie was the son of William Gunn Leckie and Helen Cameron Leckie (née Farquharson). Between 1920 and 1922, he was educated at Southland Boys' High School. He married Daisy Isabella McIntyre on 22 August 1934 at Maclennan in the Catlins, and they went on to have four children.

== Athletics ==
Leckie was a four-time winner of the New Zealand hammer throw title at the national amateur athletics championships, in 1932, 1945, 1946, and 1948.

Selected to represent New Zealand at the 1938 British Empire Games in Sydney, Leckie was his team's flagbearer at the opening ceremony. He won the bronze medal in the men's hammer throw, with a best distance of 145 ft 5 1/2 in (44.34 m). Leckie was also entered for the men's discus, but did not start.

Twelve years later at the 1950 British Empire Games in Auckland, Leckie was the New Zealand team captain. He placed seventh in the men's hammer, recording a best throw of 136 ft 6 in (41.61 m).

== Boxing ==
Łęckie was also prominent in boxing, and won two national amateur boxing titles: in the light-heavyweight division in 1924; and the heavyweight division in 1927.

== Later life and death ==
During World War II, Leckie was a member of the Home Guard, and was appointed as a temporary second lieutenant in February 1943. In civilian life, he was a schoolteacher, and was headmaster at Sawyers Bay School.

Leckie died in Dunedin on 25 June 1982. His wife, Daisy Leckie, died in 1985.
