= Harold Tyrie =

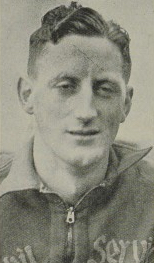
- Tyrie, c. 1937

Personal information
- Born: Harold Joffre Tyrie; 3 August 1915 Dunedin, New Zealand
- Died: 22 February 2007 (aged 91) Christchurch, New Zealand
- Weight: 90 kg (198 lb)
- Spouse: Phyllis Mary McClelland (m. 1940; died 1998)

Sport
- Country: New Zealand
- Sport: Athletics

Achievements and titles
- National finals: 440 yd champion (1936, 1939, 1940)
Medal record
Men's athletics
Representing New Zealand
British Empire Games
Bronze medal – third place	1938 Sydney	4 x 440 yard relay

Rugby union career
- Position: Second-row forward
Senior career
Years	Team	Apps	(Points)
–	Southern RUFC		
Provincial / State sides
Years	Team	Apps	(Points)
1938, 1941	Otago	2	

Harold Joffre Tyrie (3 August 1915 – 22 February 2007) was a New Zealand track and field athlete who won a bronze medal at the 1938 British Empire Games. He also played representative rugby union for Otago.

== Early life and family ==
Born in Dunedin on 3 August 1915, Tyrie was the son of William Leslie Tyrie and Annie Tyrie (née Miller). He was educated at Otago Boys' High School from 1929 to 1932. On 27 September 1940, he married Phyllis Mary McClelland at St John's Church, Millers Flat, and the couple went on to have three daughters.

== Athletics ==
Representing Otago, Tyrie won the New Zealand national 440 yards title three times: in 1936, 1939, and 1940. At the 1938 British Empire Games in Sydney, he finished sixth in the final of the men's 440 yards, and was a member of the New Zealand quartet in the men's 4 x 440 yards relay that won the bronze medal.

He later turned to coaching, and trained athletes including Don Jowett and Robin Tait.

== Rugby union ==
A second-row forward from the Southern Rugby Football Club in Dunedin, Tyrie played two representative rugby union games for Otago, in 1938 and 1941.

== Military service ==
Tyrie graduated from the 12th Officer Cadet Training Unit in September 1942 and was commissioned as a temporary second lieutenant in the New Zealand Infantry. Later, in 1944, with the rank of corporal, Tyrie was wounded in Italy while serving with the 2nd New Zealand Expeditionary Force.

== Later life and death ==
In later life, Tyrie was a ceramic artist of some note. He died in Christchurch on 22 February 2007.
