= Brian MacCabe =

English athlete (1914–1992)

Personal information
- Nationality: British (English)
- Born: 9 January 1914 Willesden, England
- Died: 31 October 1992 (aged 78) Beaconsfield, England

Sport
- Sport: Athletics
- Event: 800m/880y
- Club: L.A.C.
Medal record
Men's Athletics
Representing England
British Empire Games
Silver medal – second place	1938 Sydney	4×440 yd

Brian Farmer MacCabe (9 January 1914 – 31 October 1992) was an English athlete who competed for Great Britain in the 1936 Summer Olympics.

== Biography ==
MacCabe born in Willesden, finished ninth in the 800 metres event at the 1936 Olympic Games in Berlin.

At the 1938 Empire Games he was a member of the English relay team which won the silver medal in the 4×440 yards competition. In the 880 yards contest he finished sixth and in the 440 yards event he was eliminated in the heats. Later that Summer he finished third behind Arthur Collyer in the 880 yards event at the 1938 AAA Championships.

MacCabe served in the Royal Tank Regiment during the Second World War and was awarded a Military Cross and bar for service in North Africa.

After the War he rose rapidly in the field of advertising, becoming the youngest ever recipient of the Mackintosh Medal for services to advertising. He died in Beaconsfield.
