= Frank Handley =

English athlete (1910–1985)

Personal information
- Nationality: British (English)
- Born: 31 October 1910 Salford, England
- Died: 31 October 1985 (aged 75) Salford, England
- Height: 178 cm (5 ft 10 in)
- Weight: 64 kg (141 lb)

Sport
- Sport: Athletics
- Event: middle-distance
- Club: Salford Harriers
Medal record
Men's Athletics
Representing England
British Empire Games
Silver medal – second place	1938 Sydney	880 yards
Silver medal – second place	1938 Sydney	4×440 yd

Francis Richard Handley (31 October 1910 – 31 October 1985) was an English athlete who competed for Great Britain in the 1936 Summer Olympics.

== Biography ==
Handley was born in Salford. He finished second behind Jack Powell in the 880 yards event at the 1936 AAA Championships. One month later he was selected to represent Great Britain at the 1936 Olympic Games held in Berlin, where he was eliminated in the semi-finals of the 800 metres event.

He second behind Arthur Collyer in the 880 yards event at the 1937 AAA Championships.

At the 1938 British Empire Games he won the silver medal in the 880 yards competition. He was also a member of the English relay team which won the silver medal in the 4×440 yards contest. In the 440 yards event he was eliminated in the heats.

He died in Salford, Greater Manchester.
