= Arnold Anderson (athlete) =

New Zealand track and field athlete, navy officer, and schoolteacher (1912–1996)

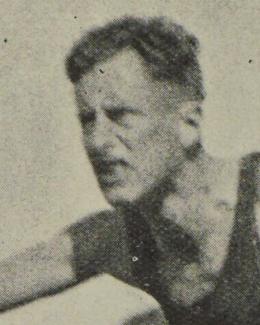
- Anderson in 1937

Personal information
- Born: Arnold Thomas Anderson; 22 March 1912 Timaru, New Zealand
- Died: 17 January 1996 (aged 83) Dunedin, New Zealand
- Education: Canterbury University College
- Occupation: Schoolteacher
- Spouse: Kathleen Stewart Moody

Sport
- Country: New Zealand
- Sport: Athletics

Achievements and titles
- National finals: 440 yards hurdles champion (1933, 1937, 1938, 1939)
Medal record
Men's Athletics
Representing New Zealand
Commonwealth Games
Bronze medal – third place	1938 Sydney	4 x 440 yards Relay

Arnold Thomas Anderson (22 March 1912 – 17 January 1996) was a New Zealand track and field athlete, navy officier and school teacher. He won a bronze medal for his country at the 1938 British Empire Games, joined the Royal Navy in World War II and then taught Latin and French at King's High School in New Zealand.

== Early life and family ==
Born in Timaru on 22 March 1912, Anderson was the son of Thomas Anderson and Louisa Jane Anderson (née Boyd). He was educated at Timaru Boys' High School, and went on to study at Canterbury University College, from where he graduated MA in 1938. In 1939, Anderson returned to Timaru Boys' High School as a teacher, before moving to Christchurch West High School the following year.

== Athletics ==
Anderson won the New Zealand national 440 yards hurdles title on four occasions: in 1933, 1937, 1938, and 1939. He represented New Zealand in the same event at the 1938 British Empire Games in Sydney, where he finished fifth. Also at the Sydney games, he was a member of the New Zealand foursome that won the bronze medal in the men's 4 x 440 yards relay.

== Military service ==
Anderson left New Zealand in December 1940 to join the Royal Navy, and he was commissioned as a sub-lieutenant in February 1942. He remained in the Royal Navy until 1944, when he returned to New Zealand and joined Naval Intelligence in Wellington.

== Later life and death ==
Following demobilisation, in 1946 Anderson was appointed as a teacher at King's High School, Dunedin, where his main teaching interests were Latin and French. He served as deputy rector from 1968 to 1970, when he left the school, returning briefly to teach in 1972.

Anderson died in Dunedin on 17 January 1996.
