= Eric Coy =

Canadian athlete (1911–1985)

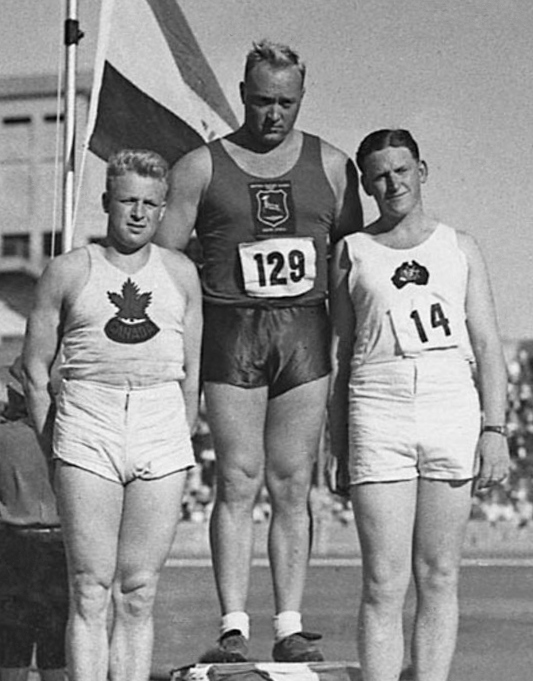
- Coy (left) at the 1938 British Empire Games

Personal information
- Born: May 17, 1911 Nottingham, England
- Died: October 28, 1985 (aged 71) Winnipeg, Canada

Sport
- Sport: Athletics
- Event(s): Shot put, discus throw

Achievements and titles
- Personal best(s): SP – 15.10 m (1939); DT – 44.90 m (1938).
Medal record
Representing Canada
British Empire Games
Gold medal – first place	1938 Sydney	Discus throw
Silver medal – second place	1938 Sydney	Shot put

Eric Eaton Coy (May 16, 1911 – October 28, 1985) was a discus thrower and shot putter, who represented Canada at the 1948 Summer Olympics. He finished 23rd in the discus throw event, and his exact result in the shot put is unknown.

At the 1938 Empire Games he won the gold medal in the discus throw and the silver medal in the shot put. At the 1954 British Empire and Commonwealth Games he finished ninth in the shot put, aged 39.

After retirement from competition, he remained active as a coach in track and field, ice hockey and wrestling, and following his death in 1985 the "Eric E. Coy Memorial Trophy" was donated by his widow, Helen, to be awarded each year to Canada's leading athlete in the four throwing events. The winner for 2006 was the Commonwealth Games hammer silver-medallist and national record-breaker, Jim Steacy.

He has an arena in Winnipeg named after him. He was inducted to the Canadian Track and Field Hall of Fame (1963), Canadian Sports Hall of Fame, and Manitoba Sports Hall of Fame (1980).
