= Alan Sayers =

New Zealand international rugby league footballer

Alan Sayers MNZM
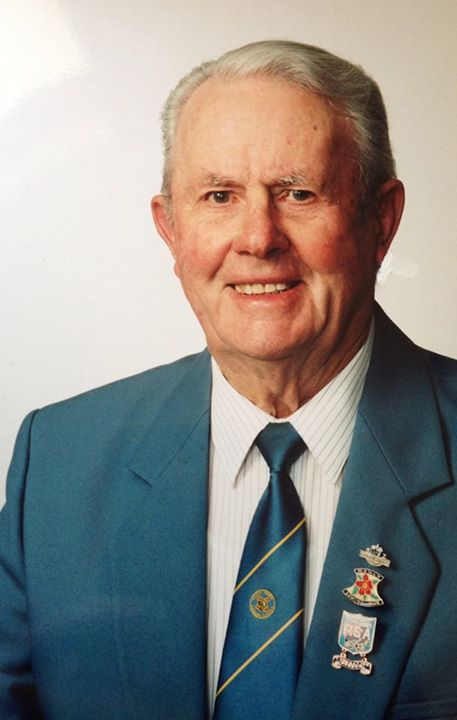

Personal information
- Full name: Alan John Sayers
- Born: 6 December 1915 Onehunga, New Zealand
- Died: 19 August 2017 (aged 101) Auckland, New Zealand
- Rugby league career

Playing information
Club
| Years | Team | Pld | T | G | FG | P |
|---|---|---|---|---|---|---|
| 1941 | Richmond Rovers | 21 | 19 | 0 | 0 | 57 |

Sport
- Country: New Zealand
- Sport: Athletics

Achievements and titles
- National finals: 440 yards champion (1937)
- Personal bests: 100 yards – 10.1 s 220 yards – 21.4 s 440 yards – 48.8 s 880 yards – 1:57; Long jump – 6.63 m High jump – 1.70 m
Medal record
Men's athletics
Representing New Zealand
Commonwealth Games
| Bronze medal – third place | 1938 Sydney | 4 x 440 yards Relay |

Alan John Sayers MNZM (6 December 1915 – 19 August 2017) was a New Zealand journalist, photographer and athlete who worked for The New Zealand Herald prior to World War II. When the war was over he was invited to join the Auckland Star where he was the first reporter in New Zealand to receive a personal by-line. In 1953 he was an official journalist on the tour of Queen Elizabeth II to the Pacific Islands and New Zealand.

== Early life and family ==
Sayers was born in the Auckland suburb of Royal Oak, the son of Mary and Horace Sayers, a builder. He was educated at Royal Oak Primary School and Auckland Grammar School. His son, Greg Sayers, is an Auckland Councillor.

== Sporting career ==
=== Athletics ===
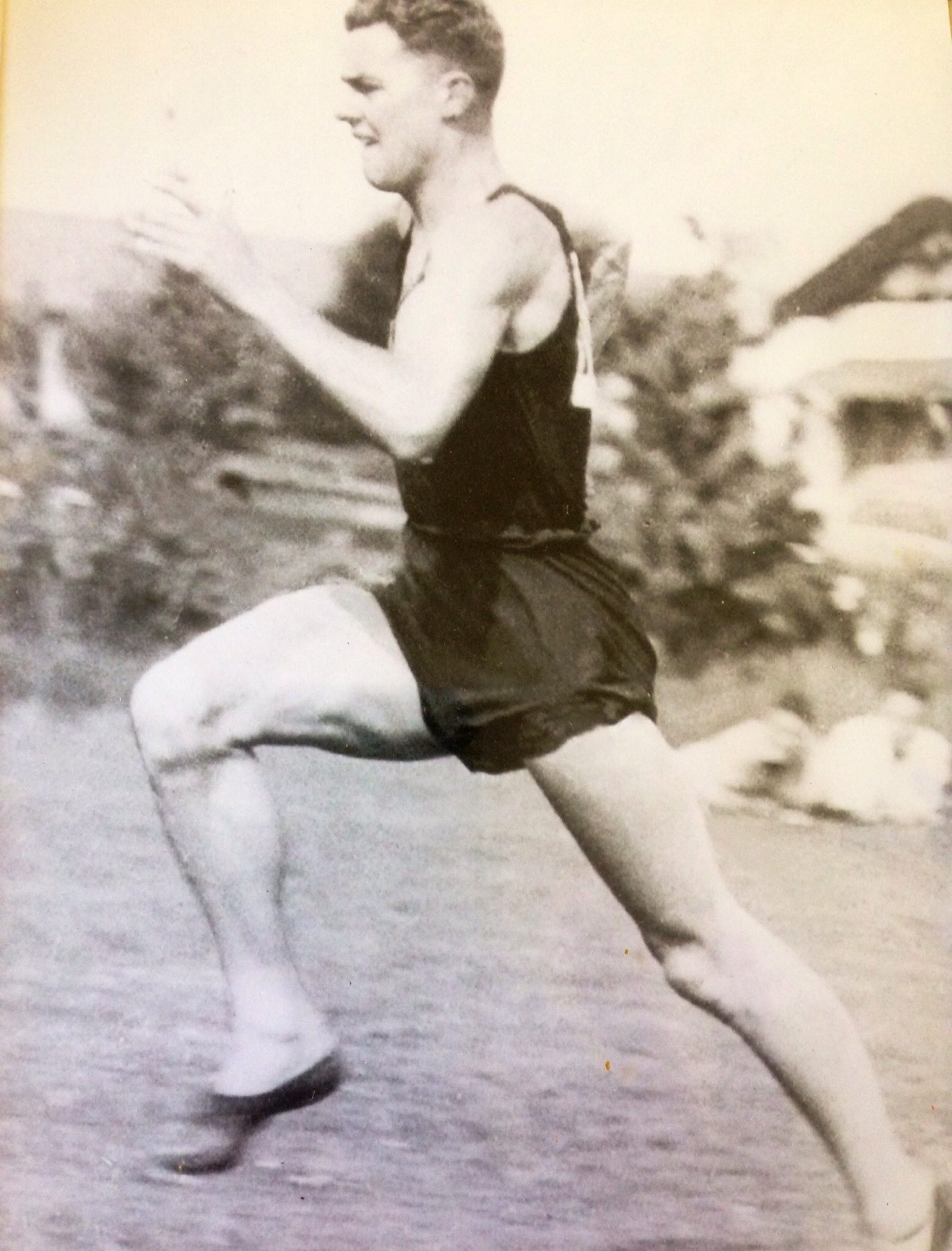
National 440 yards champion

While at Auckland Grammar Sayers competed in the 1934 Melbourne Centenary Inter-Collegiate Games and won a silver medal, becoming the second fastest schoolboy quarter-miler in the British Empire. In 1938, although recovering from a serious car accident, he competed in the British Empire Games in Sydney, winning a bronze medal as part of the men’s 440 yards relay team.

=== Rugby ===
Sayers won national 440 yards track title in 1937, represented Waikato in rugby union and played rugby league for one season, during which he scored a total of seven tries in a senior game on Carlaw Park, a record yet to be beaten. He coached track athletes, a number of whom won national titles, broke records and represented their country.

=== Yachting ===
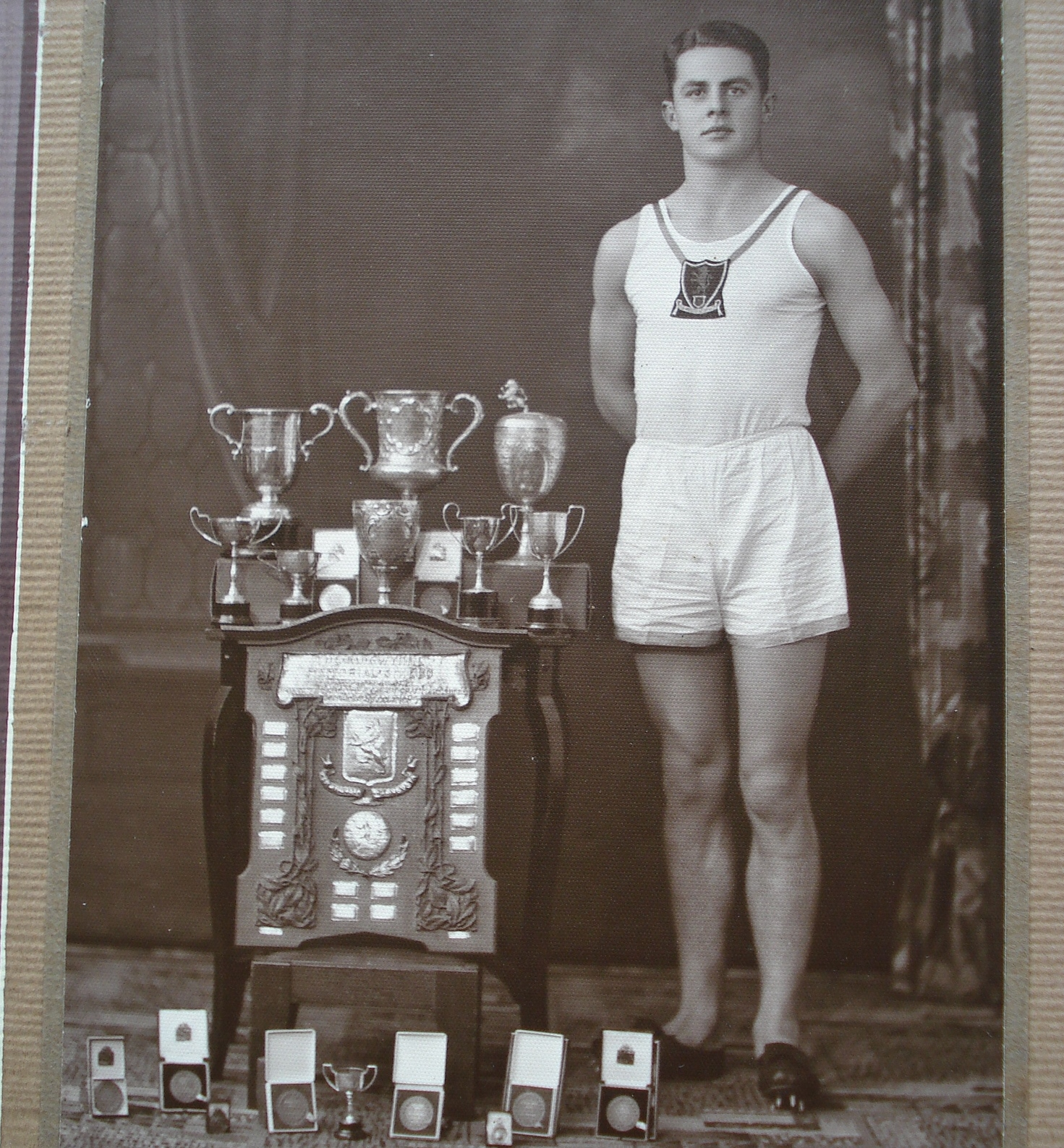
Auckland Grammar Trophies

In the world of yachting he was chairman of both the Auckland P-Class and Starling Associations, the largest youth classes in New Zealand. As patron of the Manly Sailing Club, Whangaparaoa, he was partially responsible for the building of a new waterfront clubhouse including the raising of $70,000 towards its construction. He was also patron of the Hibiscus Coast Waterwise Society.

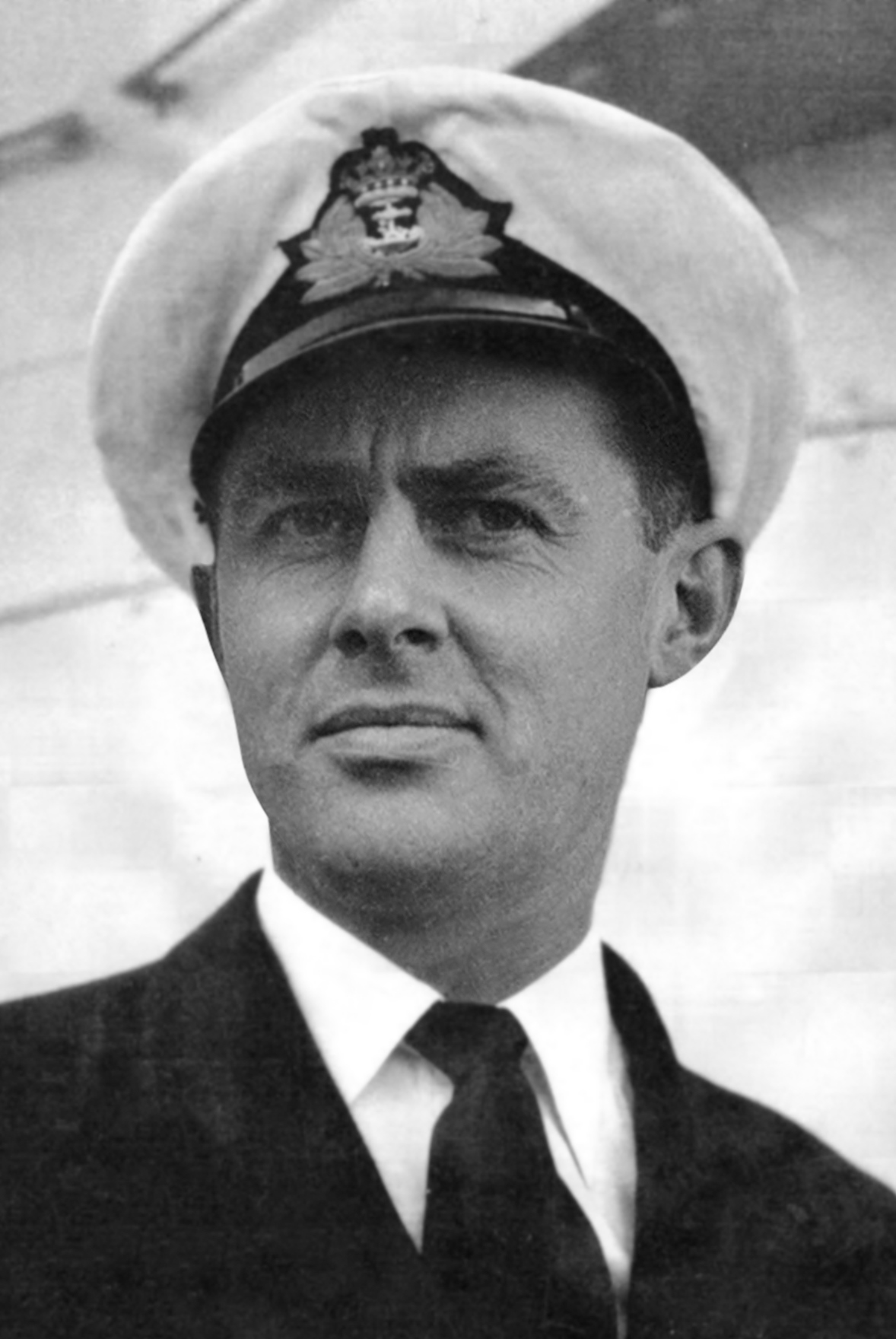
Naval Officer

== Military service ==
At the beginning of World War II Sayers enlisted in the 9th Heavy Artillery Regiment but was seconded into the Royal New Zealand Navy (special branch), where he served as an intelligence officer reporting on enemy activity in the South Pacific. He was a member of the Kings Empire Veterans and the Silverdale RSA.

== Later life and death ==
In August 2011, at the age of 96, he was entrusted by Sir Fred Allen, the only undefeated All Black coach with 37 games undefeated, to write his biography Fred The Needle which became New Zealand’s best seller during the week beginning 29 August 2011. He also gave the eulogy at Allen's funeral at the age of 96. In 2014, aged 98, Sayers published his second book Deadline, which received wide publicity in the media, including a segment on the Seven Sharp national TV programme and articles in the NZ Listener, The Rodney Times and other publications. He turned 100 in December 2015 and died in Auckland on 19 August 2017 at the age of 101.

== Honours and awards ==
In the 2003 Queen's Birthday Honours, Sayers was appointed a Member of the New Zealand Order of Merit, for services to sport and journalism.

As chairman of the Hibiscus Coast Action Committee he won a bylaw outlawing life-threatening nets set amongst swimmers in shallow water along the Arkles Bay foreshore, the only bylaw of its kind in New Zealand. His services to the community have been recognised by an Athletics New Zealand Award, a Kiwi Bank Local Heroes Award, an Age Concern Senior Achievers Award and an Auckland City Council Award. On 6 December 2015 Sayers celebrated his 100th birthday, which was acknowledged by the Auckland Council.
