= Boxing at the 1938 British Empire Games =

- Venue: Rushcutters Bay Stadium (Sydney Stadium)
- Location: Sydney, Australia
- Dates: 5 – 12 February 1938

At the 1938 British Empire Games, the boxing competition was held in Sydney, Australia, and featured contests in eight weight classes.

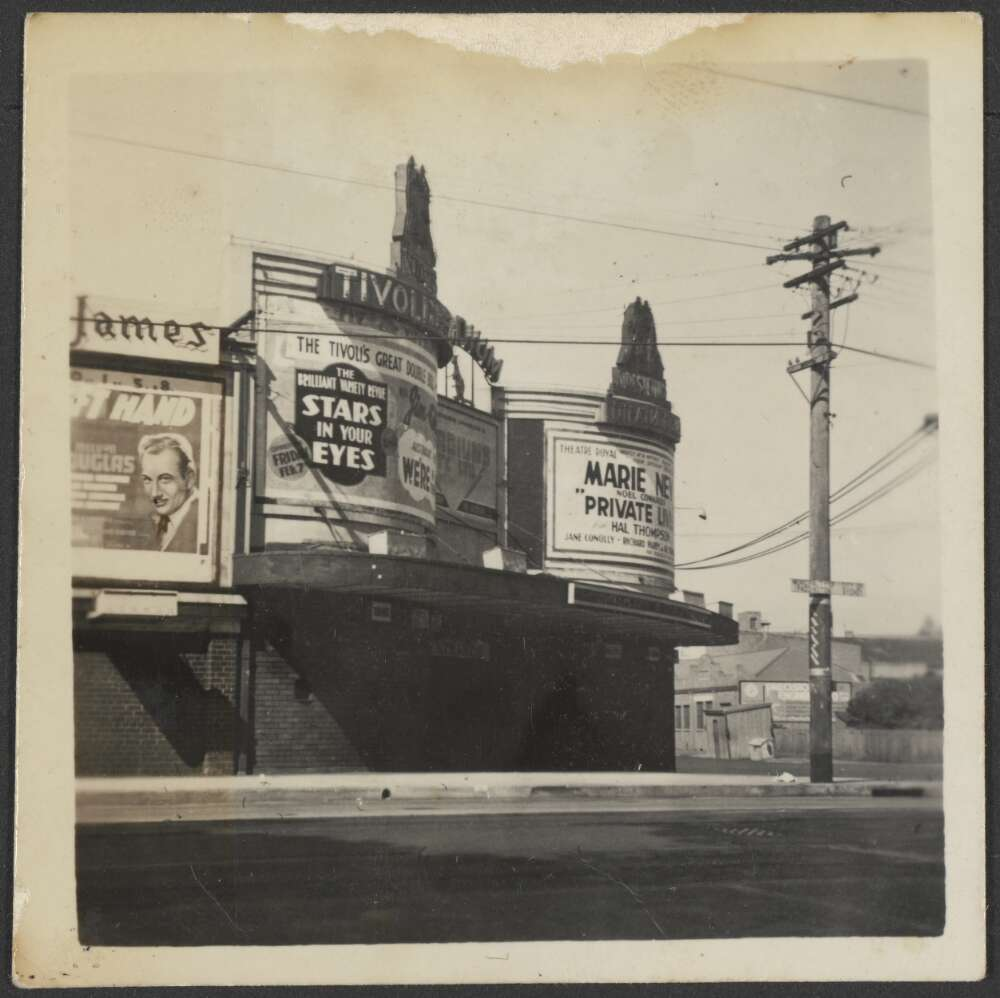
The Sydney Stadium (also called Rushcutters Bay Stadium) in 1941

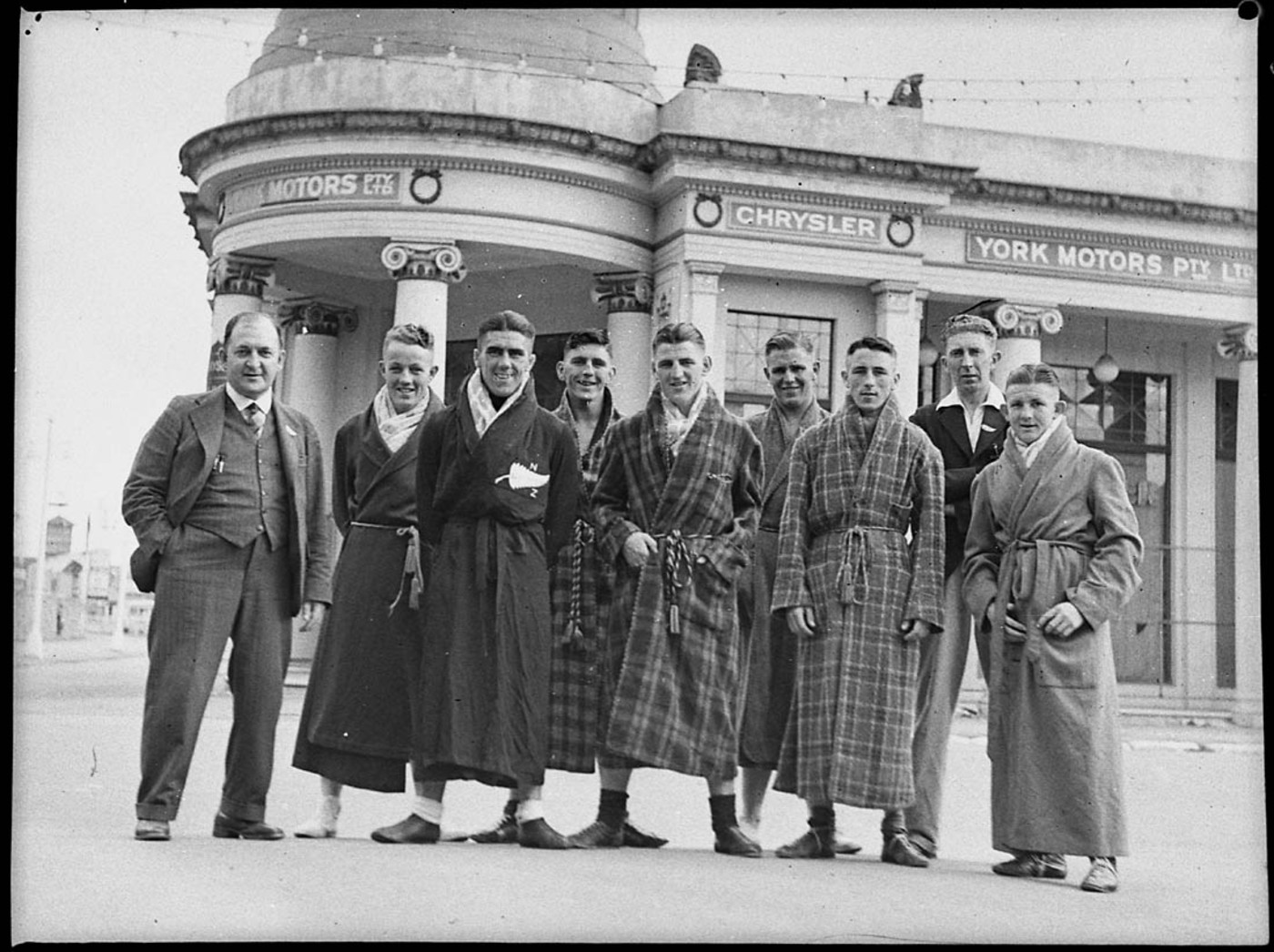
Empire Games boxers at the Sydney Showground, the New Zealander is possibly Darcy Heeney

The boxing events were held at the Rushcutters Bay Stadium (also called the Sydney Stadium), following a large number of entries for the boxing and wrestling events.

Both England and South Africa won two gold medals but South Africa topped the boxing medal table by virtue of winning two silver medals.

Only three bronze medal fights took place, with the others not being held for various reasons.

== Medal table ==
* Host nation (Australia)

Medals won by nation with totals, ranked by number of golds—sortable
Rank	Nation	Gold	Silver	Bronze	Total
1	South Africa (SAF)	2	2	0	4
2	England (ENG)	2	1	1	4
3	Canada (CAN)	1	2	1	4
4	Australia (AUS)*	1	1	2	4
5	Ceylon (CEY)	1	0	0	1
5	Wales (WAL)	1	0	0	1
7	New Zealand (NZL)	0	1	1	2
7	Scotland (SCO)	0	1	1	2
9	Southern Rhodesia (SRH)	0	0	2	2
Totals (9 entries)		8	8	8	24

=== Medallists ===
Event	Gold	Silver	Bronze
Flyweight	(South Africa) Johnny Joubert (SAF)	Joe Gagnon (CAN)	Hugh Cameron (SCO)
Bantamweight	William Butler (ENG)	(South Africa) Hendrik Knoesen (SAF)	Jack Dillon (AUS)
Featherweight	(British Ceylon) Barney Henricus (CEY)	James Watson (SCO)	Kenneth Moran (NZL)
Lightweight	Harry Groves (ENG)	Harry Hurst (CAN)	(Southern Rhodesia) William Fulton (RHO)
Welterweight	Bill Smith (AUS)	Darcy Heeney (NZL)	(Southern Rhodesia) Andrew Tsirindonis (RHO)
Middleweight	Denis Reardon (WAL)	Maurice Dennis (ENG)	Rex Carey (CAN)
Light heavyweight	(South Africa) Nick Wolmarans (SAF)	Cecil Overell (AUS)	Joseph Wilby (ENG)
Heavyweight	Thomas Osborne (CAN)	(South Africa) Claude Sterley (SAF)	Leslie Harley (AUS)

== Results ==
=== First round ===
Weight	Winner	Loser	Score
Flyweight 51kg
	(Canada) Joe Gagnon	bye	
	(Scotland) Hugh Cameron	bye	
	(New Zealand) Hugh Sheridan	bye	
	(South Africa) Johnny Joubert	(Australia) Trevor Law	TKO 2nd round
Bantamweight 54kg
	(Australia) Jack Dillon	bye	
	(Canada) William Brade	bye	
	(South Africa) Hendrik Knoesen	bye	
	(England) William Butler	(New Zealand) Jack Parker	Points
Featherweight 57kg
	(Scotland) James Watson	bye	
	(New Zealand) Kenneth Moran	bye	
	(England) Alf Harper	(Australia) Leonard Schulter	TKO 2nd round
	(British Ceylon) Barney Henricus	(South Africa) Bertram D. Worrall	Points
Lightweight 60kg
	(England) Harry Groves	bye	
	(Australia) Ian Ellis	bye	
	(Southern Rhodesia) William Fulton	(New Zealand) Joseph Collins	Points
	(Canada) Harry Hurst	(British Ceylon) Frank Clement de Niese	TKO 3rd round
Welterweight 67kg
	(New Zealand) Darcy Heeney	bye	
	(Canada) Norman Dawson	bye	
	(Australia) Bill Smith	bye	
	(Southern Rhodesia) Andrew Tsirindonis	(South Africa) Jack Hahn	Points
Middleweight 75kg
	(Canada) Rex Carey	bye	
	(Australia) Atholl Stubbs	bye	
	(England) Maurice Dennis	bye	
	(Wales) Denis Reardon	(New Zealand) Artie Sutherland	Points
Light heavyweight 81kg
	(South Africa) Nick Wolmarans	bye	
	(England) Joseph Wilby	bye	
	(Australia) Sid O. Inskip	bye	
	(Australia) Cecil G. Overell	bye	
Heavyweight 91kg
	(Canada) Thomas Osborne	bye	
	(South Africa) Claude Sterley	bye	
	(Australia) Leslie Harley	bye	
	(New Zealand) Ron Withell	bye	

=== Semi-finals ===
Weight	Winner	Loser	Score
Flyweight
	Joubert	Sheridan	Points
	Gagnon	Cameron	Points
Bantamweight
	Butler	Dillon	Points
	Knoesen	Brade	Points
Featherweight
	Henricus	Moran	Points
	Watson	Harper	Points
Lightweight
	Groves	Fulton	Points
	Hurst	Ellis	Points
Welterweight
	Smith	Dawson	Points
	Heeney	Tsirindonis	Points
Middleweight
	Reardon	Carey	Points
	Dennis	Stubbs	TKO 2nd round
Light heavyweight
	Wolmarans	Wilby	Points
	Overell	Inskip	Points
Heavyweight
	Osborne	Harley	Points
	Sterley	Withell	KO 1st round

=== Bronze medal ===
Weight	Winner	Loser	Score
Flyweight	Cameron	Sheridan	w/o overweight
Bantamweight	Dillon	Brade	Points
Featherweight	Moran	Harper	toss of coin
Lightweight	Fulton	Ellis	
Welterweight	Tsirindonis	Dawson	Points
Middleweight	Carey	Stubbs	Points
Light heavyweight	Wilby	Inskip	w/o, shoulder injury
Heavyweight	Harley	Withell	w/o

=== Finals ===
Weight	Winner	Loser	Score
Flyweight	Joubert	Gagnon	Points
Bantamweight	Butler	Knoesen	Points
Featherweight	Henricus	Watson	Points
Lightweight	Groves	Hurst	Points
Welterweight	Smith	Heeney	Points
Middleweight	Reardon	Dennis	Points
Light heavyweight	Wolmarans	Overell	Points
Heavyweight	Osborne	Sterley	Points
