= Artie Sutherland =

New Zealand boxer (1912–1949)

Personal information
- Full name: Arthur Sutherland
- Born: 7 December 1912
- Died: 16 January 1949 (aged 36); Upper Nevis, Central Otago, New Zealand
- Occupation: Gold miner
- Weight: 71 kg (156 1/2 lb)

Sport
- Country: New Zealand
- Sport: Amateur boxing

Achievements and titles
- National finals: Middleweight champion (1937)

Arthur Sutherland (7 December 1912 – 16 January 1949) was a New Zealand amateur boxer, who represented his country at the 1938 British Empire Games, and won one national amateur title in the middleweight division.

== Biography ==
Born on 7 December 1912, Arthur (Artie)Sutherland was one of the six boys and 1 girl of Clement and Lily Sutherland (née Small).

Sutherland won the New Zealand amateur middleweight boxing title in 1937. He was duly selected to represent New Zealand in the same division at the 1938 British Empire Games, but was eliminated in his first bout, being easily defeated on points by the Welsh fighter, Denis Reardon, who went on to win the gold medal.

A gold miner, Sutherland was killed on 16 January 1949 in a mining accident at Upper Nevis, about 40 km from Cromwell. He and a companion were working in a tunnel when the roof collapsed, burying Sutherland under the earth fall.
