= Burke Emery =

Canadian boxer

Personal information
- Nationality: (Canada) Canadian
- Born: Burke M. Emery Montreal, Quebec, Canada
- Occupation: Boxer
- Height: 5 ft 8 in (173cm)
- Weight: Light heavyweight

Boxing career
- Stance: Orthodox

Boxing record
- Total fights: 61
- Wins: 42
- Win by KO: 15
- Losses: 15
- Draws: 4

Burke Emery was a Canadian professional light heavyweight boxer who won the Canadian light heavyweight championship in 1960.

== Early life ==
Burke M. Emery was born in Montreal, Quebec, Canada, during the 1930s.

== Amateur boxing career ==
Fighting under the Irish Athletic Club, Emery became the 1953 Quebec Golden Gloves champion at 165 pounds and was a semi-finalist in 1954.

== Professional career ==
Burke Emery entered the professional ranks in 1954. His professional boxing debut took place in Montreal at the Mont St. Louis College Auditorium.

By early 1956, he was managed by Al Bachman of New York, who also handled Bob Cleroux and Rory Calhoun. In April 1956, the Montrealer scored his second TKO victory over Vern Stevenson in their third encounter. He then made his New York City debut at St. Nicholas Arena before fighting on five undercards at Madison Square Garden through 1958. While fighting in New York, Emery trained at Stillman's Gym.

He was defeated by unbeaten middleweight José Torres in November 1958 at St. Nicholas Arena and then travelled to England in 1959 for a four-fight campaign. The 24-year-old collected wins over Noel Trigg and Jack Whittaker before dropping back-to-back losses to 17-0 Chic Calderwood and Harry Dodoo.

=== Taking the Canadian light heavyweight championship, May 1960 ===
In November 1959, with Yvon Durelle vacating the light heavyweight crown, he entered the title picture. Emery captured the vacant Canadian light heavyweight championship on May 1, 1960, with a seventh-round knockout victory over Toronto's Gordon Baldwin in Sherbrooke. The attendance totaled a crowd of 1,800.

The champion soon signed to fight Eastern Canadian middleweight champion Blair Richardson in Halifax, Nova Scotia, on August 29, 1961. In the ninth round, he knocked out Richardson, who held a record of 28-1-1. He lost the immediate rematch to Richardson by split decision in November 1961. In their rubber match in Halifax in June 1962, Emery lost by unanimous decision.

=== Losing the Canadian light heavyweight championship, June 1965 ===
Emery put his national light heavyweight title on the line against Montreal's Leslie Borden at the Paul Sauvé Arena on June 28, 1965. In front of 1,800 spectators, the twelve-round fight ended in a unanimous decision loss.

He retired in late 1966 following a 2-2 record in his final four bouts.

== Professional boxing record ==
61 fights	42 wins	15 losses
By knockout	15	4
By decision	27	11
Draws	4	

== Life after boxing ==
By 1974, he was co-managing Nova Scotian boxer Art Hafey.

Achievements
Preceded by Vacant	Canadian Light Heavyweight Champion; May 1, 1960 – June 28, 1965	Succeeded by Leslie Borden
