= Jack Parker (boxer) =

New Zealand boxer (1915–1993)

Personal information
- Full name: John Arthur Leonard Parker
- Born: 10 July 1915; Wellington, New Zealand
- Died: 9 August 1993 (aged 78)
- Occupation: Chauffeur
- Weight: 54 kg (118 lb)

Sport
- Country: New Zealand
- Sport: Amateur boxing

Achievements and titles
- National finals: Bantamweight champion (1937)

John Arthur Leonard Parker (10 July 1915 – 9 August 1993) was a New Zealand amateur boxer who represented his country at the 1938 British Empire Games and won a national amateur title in the bantamweight division.

== Biography ==
Born in Wellington on 10 July 1915, Parker was the son of Joseph Elvery Parker and Annie Parker (née Gosling).

Parker won the New Zealand amateur bantamweight boxing title in 1937. He was duly selected to represent New Zealand in the same division at the 1938 British Empire Games, but was eliminated in his first bout, being narrowly beaten on points by the English fighter, William Butler, who went on to win the gold medal.

During World War II, Parker served as a stoker first class in the Royal New Zealand Navy.

Parker died on 9 August 1993, and was buried at Makara Cemetery.
