= William Fulton (boxer) =

Rhodesian boxer

Personal information
- Born: 6 December 1916 Sinoia, Southern Rhodesia
Medal record
Men's Boxing
Representing Southern Rhodesia
British Empire Games
Bronze medal – third place	1934 London	Featherweight
Bronze medal – third place	1938 Sydney	Lightweight

William Fulton (born 6 December 1916) was a boxer who competed in the 1934 British Empire Games in London, England and the 1938 British Empire Games in Sydney, Australia, representing Southern Rhodesia. He was born at Golden Kopje Mine, Sinoia. In 1938, he won bronze in the lightweight division after winning his bronze medal fight over J. Ellis of Australia. Previously, Fulton defeated Joseph Collins of New Zealand in a quarter-final contest before losing his semi-final bout to Harry Groves of England. Fulton also won a bronze medal in the 1934 British Empire Games in the featherweight category, defeating McGregor of Scotland before losing to Charles Catterall of South Africa and then recovering to win the bronze medal bout over Sammy Tomlinson of Canada.
