= Herbie Kronowitz =

American boxer and sports referee

Herbert "Herbie" Kronowitz

Personal information
- Born: Herbert Kronowitz; September 1923 Brooklyn, New York, US
- Died: November 9, 2012 (aged 89) Brooklyn, New York, US
- Height: 5 ft 10 in (1.78 m)
- Weight: Middleweight

Boxing career
- Stance: Orthodox

Boxing record
- Total fights: 83
- Wins: 55
- Win by KO: 2
- Losses: 23
- Draws: 5

Herbert "Herbie" Kronowitz, originally Theodore "Ted" Kronowitz (September, 1923 – November 9, 2012), was an American middleweight boxer who fought in the ring from 1941 to 1950. In 1947, Kronowitz was ranked among the top ten boxers in the world. Due to his height, his boxing style favored long range attacks, using his left jab and fast feet to outmaneuver his opponents, but he could box at close range as well. After his boxing career ended, Kronowitz was a highly regarded referee for nearly thirty years from 1955 to 1984. He resided in Bensonhurst, in his native Brooklyn, New York.

== Early life ==
Kronowitz was only 17 years old when he began his professional boxing career in 1941.

== Coast Guard service ==
Kronowitz joined the United States Coast Guard in 1943 during the World War II era. During the war, his older brother was serving in the army in the Pacific War and his younger brother Albert was killed in the Battle of the Bulge in Belgium. As a result, Herbie was ordered to remain stateside to keep him out of combat duty.

== Boxing career ==
=== Loss to Artie Levine, March 1947 ===
In 1947, Kronowitz returned to boxing after his Coast Guard Service. He was ranked tenth in the world among middleweights, and was ranked ninth for two months in that year.

On March 7, 1947, he fought Artie Levine at Madison Square Garden in New York City. They fought aten rounds in front of a crowd of 12,000. Levine won the bout, although Kronowitz claimed that while Levine "won the decision, there was no question that I won the fight."

The crowd strongly protested the judges' ruling, and Levine had to come from behind to take it, though all three judges favored Levine in the close scoring. Kronowitz was fighting as a replacement in his first main event in the garden. The bout was the last main feature between two Jewish boxers at Madison Square Garden.

The Rocky Castellani fight on September 5, 1947, at Madison Square Garden saw Kronowitz winning only the eighth round according to one source. Castellani was one of Kronowitz's best opponents and would later contend for the World Middleweight Championship in 1954. The bout showcased the Jewish boxer as a heavyweight contender, and took place before a sizable crowd of 6,800 in Wilkes-Barre, Pennsylvania.

Kronowitz also defeated Harold Green, Billy Walker, Jerry Fiorello, and Pete Mead. The Mead fight was one of Kronowitz's more widely publicized bouts, and Krononowitz was "thoroughly trounced" on September 5, 1947, at Madison Square Garden. He lost to Mead a second time in a close fight on January 15, 1948, in another close decision at the Garden.

On January 24, 1947, Kronowitz defeated Billy Walker, one of his more skilled competitors, in a rematch at St. Nicholas Arena in New York by a significant margin of the judge's scoring. He had apparently learned Walker's style from their previous meeting and applied the knowledge to his strategy. More potent punching led Kronowitz to the victory. Walker was awarded no more than three rounds by any of the ring officials. The referee for the bout was the great, retired Jewish lightweight boxer, Ruby Goldstein, whose career in the ring may have been cut short by the New York Jewish mob influencing his choice of opponents. In Kronowitz and Walker's first bout on December 9, 1946, Kronowitz won in a somewhat close ten round split decision, also at St. Nicholas. Kronowitz completed his sweep of Walker with an eight-round win on April 23, 1949, in a less well publicized bout in Brooklyn.

On May 2, 1947, Kronowitz fought Sonny Horne at New York's St. Nicholas Arena, winning in a ten-round unanimous decision. Horne, an Ohio resident, was a prolific and respected middleweight. Both boxers completed near the 160 pound mark.

=== Win over Harold Green at New York's Ebbet's Field, June 1947 ===
Kronowitz defeated fellow Jewish boxer Harold Green before a riveted crowd of around 12,000 on June 14, 1947, at Ebbet's Field in New York. Ebbets Field, the beloved home of the Brooklyn Dodgers, was the inevitable choice for the bout that drew a sizable crowd from Brooklyn's Jewish community. In a ten-round unanimous decision, Kronowitz took what some reporters called the "Middleweight Championship of Brooklyn" as both participants were well known Brooklyn natives. It was a close fight, though the points decision reflected the official's agreement that Kronowitz had thrown more punches. Kronowitz won the bout largely by his long range boxing, whereas Green dominated the infighting. With an inferior reach, Green dominated the infighting, but Kronowitz put up an excellent defense, using his reach to confine most of Greens well-connected blows to his midsection. Though Kronowitz had only an inch advantage in height over Green, he seemed to use his slight reach advantage effectively and succeeded in keeping most of the fighting at long range. His left was his most effective weapon against his opponent. As in other bouts, Kronowitz was able to use his longer reach to deliver harder punches, particularly at long range.

On August 4, 1947, Kronowitz defeated fellow Brooklyn middleweight Jerry Fiorello by a convincing number of judges points at Queensboro Arena in Queens in an eight-round unanimous decision. It was his sixth straight win, and pushed Kronowitz higher in the world welterweight rankings.

On November 28, 1947, he fought LaVerne Roach, one of his better opponents, at New York's St. Nicholas Arena before an enthusiastic crowd of 3000. Kronowitz lost in a very close ten round unanimous decision, in which both boxers remained upright throughout. Though Kronowitz proved to be the stronger puncher, rocking his opponent in the first and fifth rounds, Roach, the skilled recently discharged Marine boxer, showed better ringcraft, stamina, and technique. Roach threw more punches focusing more on the midsection of Kronowitz, who appeared to lack a strong defense in that area. An exceptionally trained boxer, Roach lost only one of 48 bouts while fighting for the Marines, and was considered one of the best fighters they had developed during the war.

On August 11, 1949, Kronowitz defeated Vinnie Cidone in a main event ten round split decision at Hamilton Arena in Brooklyn, New York. Cidone was 27, and would have a modest career as a local boxer, fighting the majority of his bouts in the Brooklyn area.

== Boxing decline 1949-50 ==
On September 26, 1949, Kronowitz was sanctioned for his "poor performance" against Lee Sala in a ten-round unanimous decision that went against him at McNearney Stadium in Schenectady, New York. The 30 day sanction was for the lack of action in the fight. The judges went strongly in favor of Sala.

One of Kronowitz's better performances in a loss was against well rated Syrian opponent Charley Zivic before a crowd of 15,097 at Madison Square Garden on February 13, 1948, in a ten-round points decision. Kronowitz fought best in the third and the seventh, though suffering from a cut nose from a previous bout. Zivic used his left more effectively in the bout, and Zivic was usually unable to defend against it. Zivic appeared to have injured his thumb in the eighth, and likely suffered from a reduced point score in the final rounds. Though a significant advantage in scoring was held by Zivic at the end, there were no knockdowns in the fight, a tribute to Kronowitz's endurance and ring craft.

On October 28, 1949, Kronowitz faced Jimmy Flood losing in a unanimous ten-round decision before a crowd of 13,000, who had come to see a vicious feature fight featuring featherweight Sandy Saddler. It was Kronowitz's last appearance at New York's Madison Square Garden. Flood, at only 20, had a large and vocal following in New York. With a constant two-fisted body attack, Flood wore down his opponent as the boxers slugged away in a give and take fashion through most of the fight. Though both boxers were very near the 160 middleweight mark, Kronowitz was seven years older than his rival, and the constant battering he had taken in his ten years as a professional was likely the critical factor in the outcome of the fight. The audience responded to the unanimous decision with both boos and cheering. Flood was on a considerable winning streak before facing Kronowitz and had lost only one bout in his busy two years of professional fighting. He was far younger and had fought far fewer battles than the ring veteran Kronowitz.

In what was one of his last high billing fights on December 12, 1949, Johnny Greco outpointed Kronowitz in a ten-round unanimous decision at the Forum in Montreal, Canada.

On March 31, 1950, Kronowitz lost a bout by knockout to Bobby Hughes in Toledo, Ohio, 1:50 into the third round. On May 29, 1950, Kronowitz faced Joey De John at the State Fair Coliseum in Syracuse, New York. He was knocked out 2:11 into the first round by his opponent. De John was one of the more skilled opponents Kronowitz met at the end of his career, but his performance likely pushed him to retire. The Hughes bout was the end of a six bout losing streak for Herbie, and though he had faced several quality opponents near the end of his career, he realized his time in the ring had come to an end.

== Life after boxing, 1950 ==
Shortly after his retirement, Kronowitz purchased two New York City taxi medallions in 1950 and worked as a taxi driver.

Later, he worked as a referee for the New York State Athletic Commission (NYSAC) for twenty nine years from 1955 to 1984. He was greatly respected and used the easy grace he gained from his years as a boxer to move quickly around the ring and take in every aspect of the bouts he refereed. He was considered an impartial and capable official.

Keeping a presence in the boxing world, he became a member of the "Ring 8" board of directors and an active member of the Veteran's Boxing Association.

He was featured in 2007 in a Jewish exhibit at the Museum of the City of New York at the intersection of Fifth Avenue and 103rd Street in Manhattan.

Kronowitz died November 9, 2012, in Brooklyn at the age of eighty-nine.
