= Joseph Wilby =

Boxer who competed for England

Personal information
- Nationality: British (English)
- Born: 16 September 1912 Wakefield, West Yorkshire
- Died: 20 November 1999 (aged 87) Sleaford, Lincolnshire
Medal record
Boxing
Representing England
British Empire Games
Bronze medal – third place	1938 Sydney	81kg

Joseph Wilby (1912 – 1999) was a male boxer who competed for England.

== Boxing career ==
Wilby represented England and won a bronze medal in the 81 kg division at the 1938 British Empire Games in Sydney, New South Wales, Australia. He captained the boxing team during the Games. Wilby won the Amateur Boxing Association 1937 light heavyweight title, when boxing for the Royal Air Force.

He later coached the British boxing team.

== Personal life ==
He was in the Royal Air Force and stationed at No 3 (A) Wing a RAF Halton, Buckinghamshire during 1938. IN 1949 he was living in Sleaford and was a Warrant officer.
