= Quebec Golden Gloves =

Boxing competitions

- Purpose: Amateur boxing
- Frequency: Every year
- Inaugurated: Montreal, Quebec, in 1938

The Quebec Golden Gloves is an amateur boxing tournament that was established in Quebec, Canada, in 1938.

== History ==
Russ Leighton and the Crescent Athletic Club inaugurated the Golden Gloves amateur boxing championships in Montreal, Quebec.

The first Quebec Golden Gloves championships were held on May 2, 1938, drawing 600 amateur boxers. Over the years, the Golden Gloves produced top Canadian boxers, including Johnny Greco, Armand Savoie, Burke Emery, Bob Cleroux, Joey Durelle, Donato Paduano, and Fernand Marcotte.

The novice class included ten weight divisions, from 100 pounds to heavyweight, and the open class had eight, from 112 pounds to heavyweight.

During the 1940s, winners of the Golden Gloves were regarded as Quebec's boxing champions. In novice and open divisions, winners and runners-up were presented with medals, and each champion's medal displayed the A.A.U. of Canada insignia. The "Lieut. Joe Gagnon Trophy," named for longtime Golden Gloves star Joe Gagnon, went to the gamest novice loser, while the "Jack Dempsey Trophy," a silver cup presented by Jack Dempsey at the inaugural event, was awarded to the novice club with the most winners. Belts were first given to Golden Gloves champions in all classes in 1950.

In its early years, sponsors included the Quebec branch of the Amateur Athletic Union of Canada, the Mount Royal YMHA, local clubs, and the Rotary Club of Montreal, while events were staged in venues such as the Mount Royal Arena, the Montreal Forum, the Mont-Saint-Louis gymnasium, and the Paul Sauvé Arena.

The Quebec Golden Gloves finals of 1953 attracted a record 11,499 fans to the Montreal Forum.

"Golden Gloves," a 27-minute documentary by Gilles Groulx about the annual amateur boxing tournament in Quebec, was released in 1961.

== Former Champions ==
- Joe Gagnon (1938-1940)
- Harry Hurst (1939)
- Clayton Kenny (1946)
- Jim Miller (1953)
- Bermane Stiverne (1999-2005)

== See also ==
- BC Golden Gloves
