= Lenny Mancini =

Recipient of the Purple Heart medal and boxer

Personal information
- Born: Leonard Nicholas Mancino; July 12, 1919 Youngstown, Ohio, U.S.
- Died: November 29, 2003 (aged 84)
- Height: 5 ft 2 in (157 cm)
- Weight: Lightweight Welterweight

Boxing career
- Stance: Orthodox

Boxing record
- Total fights: 61
- Wins: 46
- Win by KO: 16
- Losses: 12
- Draws: 3

Leonard Nicholas Mancino (July 12, 1919 – November 29, 2003), known as Lenny "Boom Boom" Mancini, was an American professional boxer. He was the father of the former WBA lightweight champion Ray Mancini.

== Personal life ==
Lenny Mancini was born July 12, 1919, in Youngstown, Ohio. Lenny is the father of former WBA lightweight champion Ray Mancini.

Shortly after the United States entered World War II and Mancini was drafted. He started out in the Medical Corps, but was eventually reassigned as an infantryman. Mancini was wounded in Metz in 1944 and awarded the Purple Heart.

== Professional career ==
Mancini debuted in professional boxing in 1937, trained by Hall of Fame trainer Ray Arcel. In May 1941, he fought reigning NBA lightweight champion Sammy Angott in a non-title fight, losing by a close split decision. A subsequent win over Dave Castilloux established Mancini as the No. 1 contender for Angott's lightweight title.

After recovering from his injuries he resumed his boxing career, now in the welterweight and middleweight divisions. However, he was unable to establish himself and retired after consecutive points losses to Harry Hurst and Rocky Castellani, with a final record of 45–12–3.

== Professional boxing record ==
61 fights	46 wins	12 losses
By knockout	16	0
By decision	30	12
Draws	3	

No.	Result	Opponent	Win type	Round	Date	Location
1	Win	Emil Tanner	PTS	4/4	1937-09-21	Rayen-Wood Auditorium, Youngstown
2	Win	Pat Murphy	PTS	6/6	1938-10-31	Rayen-Wood Auditorium, Youngstown
3	Win	J. Dee Williams	PTS	6/6	1939-02-20	Youngstown
4	Win	Charley Varre	PTS	4/4	1939-03-14	Broadway Arena, Brooklyn
5	Win	J. Dee Williams	PTS	6/6	1939-07-24	Idora Park, Youngstown
6	Win	Paul Trinkle	KO	1/4	1939-09-07	Fort Hamilton Arena, Brooklyn
7	Win	Patsy Pesca	PTS	4/4	1939-09-11	St. Nicholas Arena, New York
8	Win	Solly Pearl	TKO	3/4	1939-09-16	Ridgewood Grove, Queens
9	Win	Johnny Cockfield	KO	2/6	1939-10-03	Broadway Arena, Brooklyn
10	Win	George Zeitz	KO	4/6	1939-10-10	Broadway Arena, Brooklyn
11	Win	Bobby Sylvester	TKO	3/6	1939-10-24	Broadway Arena, Brooklyn
12	Win	Young Chappie	KO	1/8	1939-11-07	Broadway Arena, Brooklyn
13	Win	Jimmy Lancaster	TKO	7/8	1939-11-14	Broadway Arena, Brooklyn
14	Loss	Johnny Rinaldi	PTS	8/8	1939-12-05	Broadway Arena, Brooklyn
15	Win	Herbie Gilmore	TKO	2/8	1940-01-02	Broadway Arena, Brooklyn
16	Draw	Marty Servo	PTS	6/6	1940-01-24	Madison Square Garden, New York
17	Win	Texas Lee Harper	PTS	8/8	1940-02-06	Broadway Arena, Brooklyn
18	Win	Frankie Terranova	TKO	4/8	1940-02-20	Broadway Arena, Brooklyn
19	Win	Pat Foley	PTS	8/8	1940-03-05	Broadway Arena, Brooklyn
20	Loss	Johnny Rohrig	PTS	8/8	1940-03-19	Broadway Arena, Brooklyn
21	Win	Joey Fontana	PTS	8/8	1940-04-16	Broadway Arena, Brooklyn
22	Draw	Jimmy Vaughn	PTS	8/8	1940-05-07	Broadway Arena, Brooklyn
23	Win	Everette Rightmire	PTS	8/8	1940-09-17	Broadway Arena, Brooklyn
24	Win	Joey Fontana	PTS	8/8	1940-10-01	Broadway Arena, Brooklyn
25	Win	Carl Guggino	PTS	8/8	1940-10-22	Broadway Arena, Brooklyn
26	Loss	Irving Eldridge	PTS	8/8	1940-11-19	Broadway Arena, Brooklyn
27	Win	Irving Eldridge	PTS	8/8	1940-12-10	Broadway Arena, Brooklyn
28	Win	Charley Varre	PTS	8/8	1941-01-14	Broadway Arena, Brooklyn
29	Loss	Leo Rodak	PTS	8/8	1941-02-07	Madison Square Garden, New York
30	Win	Chief Crazy Horse	PTS	8/8	1941-03-11	Broadway Arena, Brooklyn
31	Win	Billy Marquart	PTS	8/8	1941-04-01	Broadway Arena, Brooklyn
32	Win	Billy Marquart	SD	10/10	1941-04-29	Arena, Cleveland
33	Loss	Sammy Angott	MD	10/10	1941-05-19	Public Hall, Cleveland
34	Draw	Terry Young	PTS	8/8	1941-07-14	Dexter Park Arena, Queens
35	Win	Pete Galiano	TKO	2/10	1941-08-07	Youngstown
36	Loss	Pete Lello	PTS	10/10	1941-08-13	Chicago Stadium Outdoor Arena
37	Win	Abie Kaufman	PTS	8/8	1941-09-23	Broadway Arena, Brooklyn
38	Win	Terry Young	PTS	8/8	1941-09-29	Polo Grounds, New York
39	Win	Joey Peralta	PTS	8/8	1941-10-31	Madison Square Garden, New York
40	Win	Dave Castilloux	SD	10/10	1941-11-11	Forum, Montreal
41	Win	Pete Galiano	RTD	3/8	1943-09-17	Fort Hamilton Arena, Brooklyn
42	Win	Stanford Tuckett	PTS	8/8	1944-03-13	Laurel Garden, Newark
43	Win	Rudy Richardson	PTS	8/8	1944-03-23	Masonic Hall, Highland Park
44	Win	Leroy Saunders	TKO	5/8	1944-03-28	Broadway Arena, Brooklyn
45	Win	Tiger Nelson	KO	1/8	1944-04-11	Broadway Arena, Brooklyn
46	Win	Joe Lemieux	KO	3/10	1944-04-17	Valley Arena, Holyoke
47	Win	Stanley Sims	UD	8/8	1945-10-02	Broadway Arena, Brooklyn
48	Win	Patsy Spataro	PTS	8/8	1945-10-23	Broadway Arena, Brooklyn
49	Win	Steve Riggio	UD	8/8	1945-11-27	Broadway Arena, Brooklyn
50	Win	Torpedo Reed	SD	8/8	1946-01-15	Broadway Arena, Brooklyn
51	Loss	Phil Palmer	UD	10/10	1946-02-25	St. Nicholas Arena, New York
52	Win	Vic Pignataro	KO	2/8	1946-04-23	Broadway Arena, Brooklyn
53	Win	Vic Costa	UD	8/8	1946-04-30	Broadway Arena, Brooklyn
54	Win	Bobby Simmons	MD	10/10	1946-06-06	Idora Park, Youngstown
55	Win	Victor Moreno	UD	8/8	1946-07-09	MacArthur Stadium, Brooklyn
56	Loss	Harry Hurst	PTS	10/10	1946-09-12	Forum, Montreal
57	Win	Cyril Gallie	KO	1/8	1946-10-08	Broadway Arena, Brooklyn
58	Loss	Harry Hurst	SD	10/10	1946-10-18	Forum, Montreal
59	Loss	Johnny Williams	SD	8/8	1946-11-05	Broadway Arena, Brooklyn
60	Loss	Rocky Castellani	PTS	8/8	1947-09-19	Madison Square Garden, New York
61	Loss	Rocky Castellani	UD	10/10	1947-12-19	Watres Armory, Scranton
