= Scotland at the 1938 British Empire Games =

- CG code: SCO
- CGA: Scotland at the Commonwealth Games
- Website: www.teamscotland.scot

in Sydney, Australia
- Medals Ranked 8th: Gold 0 Silver 2 Bronze 3 Total 5

British Empire Games appearances
- 1930; 1934; 1938; 1950; 1954; 1958; 1962; 1966; 1970; 1974; 1978; 1982; 1986; 1990; 1994; 1998; 2002; 2006; 2010; 2014; 2018; 2022; 2026; 2030

Scotland at the 1938 British Empire Games (abbreviated SCO) was the third time that the nation had participated at the Games following the appearances in 1930 and 1934.

The Games were held in Sydney, Australia from 5 to 12 February 1938 and Scotland came 8th overall in the games with two silver medals and three bronze medals.

== Medals ==
=== Gold ===
- None

=== Silver ===
- David Young, Athletics
- James Watson, Boxing

=== Bronze ===
- Hugh Cameron, Boxing
- Margot Hamilton, Swimming
- Thomas Ward, Wrestling

== Team ==
=== Athletics ===
Men

Athlete	Events	club/notes	Medals
Bobby Graham	880y, 1 mile, 3 miles	Maryhill Harriers	
Donald Robertson	Marathon	Maryhill Harriers	
David Young	Discus throw, shot put	Shettleston Harriers	Silver medal

Women

Athlete	Events	Notes	Medals
Margaret McDowall	100y, 220y	Ardeer & Kilmarnock Harriers	

=== Boxing ===
Athlete	Events	Notes	Medals
Hugh Cameron	Flyweight	Port Glasgow AAC	Bronze medal
James Watson	Featherweight	Leith Victoria BC	Silver medal

=== Lawn bowls ===
Athlete	Events	Club/notes	Medals
James McAlpine	Pairs	Cardonald BC, Glasgow	
Alexander Templeton	Pairs	Kilmarnock BC	

=== Swimming ===
Men

Athlete	Events	Notes	Medals
Willie Francis	110y backstroke	Renfrew District ASC	

Women

Athlete	Events	Notes	Medals
Margot Hamilton	110y backstroke, 110y freestyle	Western Baths, Glasgow	

=== Wrestling ===
Athlete	Events	Notes	Medals
Archie Dudgeon	Heavyweight	Premier Weightlifting and Wrestling Club	
Thomas Ward	Light heavyweight	Metropolitan Police	Bronze medal

== See also ==
- Scotland at the Commonwealth Games
