= Artie Levine =

American boxer (1925–2012)

Personal information
- Nickname: Artie
- Nationality: American
- Born: Arthur Lindsley LeVien; January 26, 1925 Brooklyn, New York
- Died: January 13, 2012 (aged 86) Matthews, North Carolina
- Height: 5 ft 9 in (1.75 m)
- Weight: Middleweight; Light Heavyweight

Boxing career
- Stance: Orthodox

Boxing record
- Total fights: 73
- Wins: 53
- Win by KO: 38
- Losses: 15
- Draws: 5

Artie Levine (January 26, 1925 – January 13, 2012) was an American boxer in the middleweight and light heavyweight divisions in the 1940s during which time he gained top ten ratings in both weight classes. Between May, 1946 and April, 1949 Levine was ranked by The Ring magazine as high as the #6 Middleweight in the world.

== Overview ==
Levine, who was Jewish and from Brooklyn, was a legitimate contender who flattened 36 opponents with his devastating left hook.

At 5' 8", he was a right handed slugger, with an orthodox fighting style. His left hook made him a fighter who no one looked forward to facing in the ring. He was trained by Charley Goldman, the fabled trainer of boxing legend Rocky Marciano.

From 1941–42, Levine fought twenty-seven times with only two losses, and won by knockout an impressive seventeen times.

== Levine vs. Robinson ==
On November 6, 1946, Levine challenged Sugar Ray Robinson at the Arena in Cleveland, Ohio. Barely able to rise from a nine count in the fifth, Robinson later claimed Levine hit him with the hardest punch of his career, a powerful left hook to the jaw. The referee held up the fight after Robinson was down, and walked Levine to his corner, and then resumed the count, giving Robinson as much as seventeen seconds to recover, an act which may have prevented Levine from immediately following up and ending the fight. After clinching for the remainder of the round to recover, Robinson came back and knocked out Levine in the tenth round after a paralyzing blow to the solar plexus allowed him to follow up with rapid blows to the head and body that put Levine down for the full count. It was the first time Levine had been knocked out in 60 fights, and nearly the only knockdown and almost the only real knockout loss in Robinson's impressive career (Robinson was later defeated by technical knockout by Joey Maxim, but only after suffering from exhaustion in the Maxim contest).

On March 11, 1946, Levine matched skills with Jimmy Doyle in Cleveland, Ohio, defeating him in a ninth round knock out. Levine later told a reporter that Doyle nearly died in the ring as the result of the blows he received and required a respirator to stay alive. Doyle died a year later in a fight with Sugar Ray Robinson. Levine claimed the experience affected his aggressiveness in the ring, and reduced his desire to stay with boxing as a career.

Experiencing a decline, he lost to Billy Fox at Madison Square Garden in a third-round technical knockout on June 27, 1947. Fox had been nearly knocked out in the second round, but came back to send Levine to the mat in the third before the referee ended the bout.

== Life after boxing ==
After losses to Chuck Hunter and Dick Wagner, Levine retired in 1949 at only 24, feeling disillusioned and disgusted by the criminal element he felt had taken over his career. Using his ambition and intellect, he owned a meat business, started a local teamsters union and became a successful sales manager at Volkswagen, one of America's largest car dealerships. He died on January 13, 2012, at the age of 86 in Matthews, North Carolina, and was buried at Woodlawn Cemetery.

== Professional boxing record ==
All information in this section is derived from BoxRec, unless otherwise stated.

=== Official record ===
73 fights	53 wins	15 losses
By knockout	38	4
By decision	15	11
Draws	4	
Newspaper decisions/draws	1	

All newspaper decisions are officially regarded as “no decision” bouts and are not counted in the win/loss/draw column.

No.	Result	Record	Opponent	Type	Round, time	Date	Age	Location
73	Loss	53–15–4 (1)	Dick Wagner	KO	10 (10), 0:18	Jun 20, 1949	24 years, 145 days	Arena, Cleveland, Ohio, US
72	Loss	53–14–4 (1)	Dick Wagner	SD	10	Apr 11, 1949	24 years, 75 days	Arena, Cleveland, Ohio, US
71	Loss	53–13–4 (1)	Chuck Hunter	SD	10	Feb 22, 1949	24 years, 27 days	Arena, Cleveland, Ohio, US
70	Win	53–12–4 (1)	Tom McKeagney	TKO	8 (10), 1:29	Jan 24, 1949	23 years, 364 days	Eastern Parkway Arena, New York City, New York, US
69	Win	52–12–4 (1)	Tony DeMicco	TKO	8 (10), 1:44	Dec 27, 1948	23 years, 336 days	Eastern Parkway Arena, New York City, New York, US
68	Win	51–12–4 (1)	Henryk Chmielewski	TKO	4 (10), 1:18	Nov 22, 1948	23 years, 301 days	Rhode Island Auditorium, Providence, Rhode Island, US
67	Win	50–12–4 (1)	Willie Hedgemond	KO	1 (10)	Nov 11, 1948	23 years, 290 days	Casino, Fall River, Massachusetts, US
66	Win	49–12–4 (1)	Joe Reddick	KO	6 (10), 2:16	Jun 21, 1948	23 years, 147 days	Century Stadium, West Springfield, Massachusetts, US
65	Loss	48–12–4 (1)	Billy Fox	TKO	3 (10), 1:32	Jun 27, 1947	22 years, 152 days	Madison Square Garden, New York City, New York, US
64	Loss	48–11–4 (1)	Chuck Hunter	KO	9 (10), 1:12	May 12, 1947	22 years, 106 days	Arena, Cleveland, Ohio, US
63	Win	48–10–4 (1)	Herbie Kronowitz	UD	10	Mar 7, 1947	22 years, 40 days	Madison Square Garden, New York City, New York, US
62	Win	47–10–4 (1)	Jimmy Sheppard	RTD	6 (10)	Dec 3, 1946	21 years, 311 days	Arena, Cleveland, Ohio, US
61	Loss	46–10–4 (1)	Sugar Ray Robinson	TKO	10 (10), 2:41	Nov 6, 1946	21 years, 284 days	Arena, Cleveland, Ohio, US
60	Loss	46–9–4 (1)	Jimmy Sheppard	SD	10	Oct 7, 1946	21 years, 254 days	Rhode Island Auditorium, Providence, Rhode Island, US
59	Win	46–8–4 (1)	Charley Padalino	KO	2 (10), 2:09	Aug 19, 1946	21 years, 205 days	Lakefront Stadium, Cleveland, Ohio, US
58	Win	45–8–4 (1)	Vic Dellicurti	TKO	10 (10), 1:31	Jul 10, 1946	21 years, 165 days	Ebbets Field, New York City, New York, US
57	Win	44–8–4 (1)	Freddie Flores	KO	1 (10)	Jun 24, 1946	21 years, 149 days	Coney Island Velodrome, New York City, New York, US
56	Win	43–8–4 (1)	Wilfie Shanks	TKO	3 (10), 1:31	Jun 13, 1946	21 years, 138 days	Fort Hamilton Arena, New York City, New York, US
55	Win	42–8–4 (1)	Charley Padalino	TKO	3 (10), 2:00	May 29, 1946	21 years, 123 days	Arena, Cleveland, Ohio, US
54	Win	41–8–4 (1)	Jimmy Doyle	TKO	9 (10), 0:57	Mar 11, 1946	21 years, 44 days	Arena, Cleveland, Ohio, US
53	Win	40–8–4 (1)	Billy Walker	KO	9 (10)	Jan 14, 1946	20 years, 353 days	Arena, Cleveland, Ohio, US
52	Loss	39–8–4 (1)	Sonny Horne	UD	10	Dec 7, 1945	20 years, 315 days	Madison Square Garden, New York City, New York, US
51	Win	39–7–4 (1)	Ray Rovelli	KO	7 (8), 1:54	Sep 28, 1945	20 years, 245 days	Fort Hamilton Arena, New York City, New York, US
50	Win	38–7–4 (1)	Sonny Horne	TKO	5 (10)	Aug 31, 1945	20 years, 217 days	Madison Square Garden, New York City, New York, US
49	Loss	37–7–4 (1)	Jerry Fiorello	UD	10	Jul 24, 1945	20 years, 179 days	MacArthur Stadium, New York City, New York, US
48	Win	37–6–4 (1)	Marvin Bryant	TKO	10 (10), 0:22	Jul 12, 1945	20 years, 167 days	Fort Hamilton Arena, New York City, New York, US
47	Win	36–6–4 (1)	Joe Bennett	UD	8	Apr 24, 1945	20 years, 88 days	Broadway Arena, New York City, New York, US
46	Win	35–6–4 (1)	Cosby Linson	PTS	10	Apr 19, 1945	20 years, 83 days	U.S.O. Auditorium, Norfolk, Virginia, US
45	Win	34–6–4 (1)	Willie Watkins	TKO	4 (8)	Apr 4, 1945	20 years, 68 days	Arena, Cleveland, Ohio, US
44	Win	33–6–4 (1)	Lou Miller	KO	2 (10)	Mar 29, 1945	20 years, 62 days	Casino, Fall River, Massachusetts, US
43	Win	32–6–4 (1)	Lew Perez	TKO	4 (10)	Mar 8, 1945	20 years, 41 days	Casino, Fall River, Massachusetts, US
42	Win	31–6–4 (1)	Ray Rovelli	PTS	10	Aug 17, 1944	19 years, 204 days	Fort Hamilton Arena, New York City, New York, US
41	Win	30–6–4 (1)	Joe Agosta	TKO	5 (8), 0:40	Jun 22, 1944	19 years, 148 days	Fort Hamilton Arena, New York City, New York, US
40	Loss	29–6–4 (1)	Lou Bass	PTS	9	May 26, 1944	19 years, 121 days	U.S.O. Auditorium, Norfolk, Virginia, US
39	Loss	29–5–4 (1)	Reuben Shank	PTS	10	Jan 14, 1944	18 years, 353 days	U.S.O. Auditorium, Norfolk, Virginia, US
38	Win	29–4–4 (1)	Harold Gary	PTS	6	Jul 20, 1943	18 years, 175 days	MacArthur Stadium, New York City, New York, US
37	Loss	28–4–4 (1)	Freddie Flores	PTS	8	Mar 15, 1943	18 years, 48 days	St. Nicholas Arena, New York City, New York, US
36	Draw	28–3–4 (1)	Freddie Flores	PTS	6	Mar 5, 1943	18 years, 38 days	Madison Square Garden, New York City, New York, US
35	Win	28–3–3 (1)	Frankie Young	UD	10	Feb 11, 1943	18 years, 16 days	Casino, Fall River, Massachusetts, US
34	Loss	27–3–3 (1)	Larry Fontana	PTS	6	Feb 5, 1943	18 years, 10 days	Madison Square Garden, New York City, New York, US
33	Win	27–2–3 (1)	Gene Johnson	PTS	6	Jan 27, 1943	18 years, 1 day	Scott Hall, Elizabeth, New Jersey, US
32	Win	26–2–3 (1)	Tony Grey	TKO	5 (10)	Jan 21, 1943	17 years, 360 days	Casino, Fall River, Massachusetts, US
31	Draw	25–2–3 (1)	Frankie Young	PTS	10	Jan 7, 1943	17 years, 346 days	Casino, Fall River, Massachusetts, US
30	Win	25–2–2 (1)	Frankie McDougall	UD	10	Dec 10, 1942	17 years, 318 days	Casino, Fall River, Massachusetts, US
29	Win	24–2–2 (1)	Tony Pappa	PTS	6	Nov 27, 1942	17 years, 305 days	Masonic Hall, Highland Park, New Jersey, US
28	Loss	23–2–2 (1)	Marvin Bryant	PTS	6	Nov 23, 1942	17 years, 301 days	Laurel Garden, Newark, New Jersey, US
27	Win	23–1–2 (1)	Frankie McDougall	PTS	10	Nov 19, 1942	17 years, 297 days	Casino, Fall River, Massachusetts, US
26	Win	22–1–2 (1)	Joe Snedeker	PTS	6	Nov 13, 1942	17 years, 291 days	Masonic Hall, Highland Park, New Jersey, US
25	Win	21–1–2 (1)	Charlie 'Petey' Smith	TKO	2 (6)	Nov 5, 1942	17 years, 283 days	Scott Hall, Elizabeth, New Jersey, US
24	Win	20–1–2 (1)	Al Evans	KO	6 (8)	Jul 30, 1942	17 years, 185 days	Casino, Fall River, Massachusetts, US
23	Win	19–1–2 (1)	Eddie Costantino	PTS	6	Jul 16, 1942	17 years, 171 days	Fort Hamilton Arena, New York City, New York, US
22	Draw	18–1–2 (1)	Benny Deans	PTS	6	Jul 9, 1942	17 years, 164 days	Twin City Bowl, Elizabeth, New Jersey, US
21	Draw	18–1–1 (1)	Buddy Farrell	PTS	6	Jun 25, 1942	17 years, 150 days	Twin City Bowl, Elizabeth, New Jersey, US
20	Win	18–1 (1)	Oscar Suggs	RTD	5 (6)	Jun 18, 1942	17 years, 143 days	Casino, Fall River, Massachusetts, US
19	Win	17–1 (1)	Danny Nobrega	KO	5 (6)	May 28, 1942	17 years, 122 days	Casino, Fall River, Massachusetts, US
18	Win	16–1 (1)	Bobby Hall	KO	1 (6)	May 14, 1942	17 years, 108 days	Scott Hall, Elizabeth, New Jersey, US
17	Win	15–1 (1)	Buddy Farrell	PTS	6	Apr 30, 1942	17 years, 94 days	Scott Hall, Elizabeth, New Jersey, US
16	Win	14–1 (1)	Jack Garrity	TKO	2 (6)	Apr 16, 1942	17 years, 80 days	Scott Hall, Elizabeth, New Jersey, US
15	Win	13–1 (1)	Tom Collins	TKO	2 (4)	Apr 14, 1942	17 years, 78 days	Auditorium, Hartford, Connecticut, US
14	Win	12–1 (1)	Buddy Farrell	PTS	6	Apr 1, 1942	17 years, 65 days	Scott Hall, Elizabeth, New Jersey, US
13	Win	11–1 (1)	Willie Bush	KO	2 (6)	Mar 12, 1942	17 years, 45 days	Scott Hall, Elizabeth, New Jersey, US
12	Loss	10–1 (1)	Tony Pappa	PTS	6	Feb 6, 1942	17 years, 11 days	Masonic Hall, Highland Park, New Jersey, US
11	Win	10–0 (1)	Sammy Mancuso	TKO	3 (6)	Jan 29, 1942	17 years, 3 days	Scott Hall, Elizabeth, New Jersey, US
10	Win	9–0 (1)	Don Sandham	KO	4 (6)	Jan 22, 1942	16 years, 361 days	Scott Hall, Elizabeth, New Jersey, US
9	Win	8–0 (1)	Steve Bilko	KO	3 (6)	Jan 8, 1942	16 years, 347 days	Scott Hall, Elizabeth, New Jersey, US
8	Win	7–0 (1)	Billy Miller	KO	5 (6)	Jan 6, 1942	16 years, 345 days	Grotto Auditorium, Jersey City, New Jersey, US
7	Win	6–0 (1)	Tommy Milton	TKO	2 (6)	Dec 26, 1941	16 years, 334 days	Scott Hall, Elizabeth, New Jersey, US
6	Win	5–0 (1)	Moishe Goldstein	KO	1 (6)	Dec 15, 1941	16 years, 323 days	Laurel Garden, Newark, New Jersey, US
5	Win	4–0 (1)	Freddie Conn	KO	2 (4)	Dec 11, 1941	16 years, 319 days	Scott Hall, Elizabeth, New Jersey, US
4	Win	3–0 (1)	Paulie Wilson	PTS	8	Dec 1, 1941	16 years, 309 days	Laurel Garden, Newark, New Jersey, US
3	Win	2–0 (1)	Joe Snedeker	KO	2 (4)	Nov 21, 1941	16 years, 299 days	Masonic Hall, Highland Park, New Jersey, US
2	Draw	1–0 (1)	Joe Snedeker	NWS	4	Nov 7, 1941	16 years, 285 days	Masonic Hall, Highland Park, New Jersey, US
1	Win	1–0	Carl Jones	KO	2 (4)	May 23, 1941	16 years, 117 days	Fort Hamilton Arena, New York City, New York, US

=== Unofficial record ===
73 fights	53 wins	15 losses
By knockout	38	4
By decision	15	11
Draws	5	

Record with the inclusion of newspaper decisions in the win/loss/draw column.

No.	Result	Record	Opponent	Type	Round	Date	Age	Location
73	Loss	53–15–5	Dick Wagner	KO	10 (10), 0:18	Jun 20, 1949	24 years, 145 days	Arena, Cleveland, Ohio, US
72	Loss	53–14–5	Dick Wagner	SD	10	Apr 11, 1949	24 years, 75 days	Arena, Cleveland, Ohio, US
71	Loss	53–13–5	Chuck Hunter	SD	10	Feb 22, 1949	24 years, 27 days	Arena, Cleveland, Ohio, US
70	Win	53–12–5	Tom McKeagney	TKO	8 (10), 1:29	Jan 24, 1949	23 years, 364 days	Eastern Parkway Arena, New York City, New York, US
69	Win	52–12–5	Tony DeMicco	TKO	8 (10), 1:44	Dec 27, 1948	23 years, 336 days	Eastern Parkway Arena, New York City, New York, US
68	Win	51–12–5	Henryk Chmielewski	TKO	4 (10), 1:18	Nov 22, 1948	23 years, 301 days	Rhode Island Auditorium, Providence, Rhode Island, US
67	Win	50–12–5	Willie Hedgemond	KO	1 (10)	Nov 11, 1948	23 years, 290 days	Casino, Fall River, Massachusetts, US
66	Win	49–12–5	Joe Reddick	KO	6 (10), 2:16	Jun 21, 1948	23 years, 147 days	Century Stadium, West Springfield, Massachusetts, US
65	Loss	48–12–5	Billy Fox	TKO	3 (10), 1:32	Jun 27, 1947	22 years, 152 days	Madison Square Garden, New York City, New York, US
64	Loss	48–11–5	Chuck Hunter	KO	9 (10), 1:12	May 12, 1947	22 years, 106 days	Arena, Cleveland, Ohio, US
63	Win	48–10–5	Herbie Kronowitz	UD	10	Mar 7, 1947	22 years, 40 days	Madison Square Garden, New York City, New York, US
62	Win	47–10–5	Jimmy Sheppard	RTD	6 (10)	Dec 3, 1946	21 years, 311 days	Arena, Cleveland, Ohio, US
61	Loss	46–10–5	Sugar Ray Robinson	TKO	10 (10), 2:41	Nov 6, 1946	21 years, 284 days	Arena, Cleveland, Ohio, US
60	Loss	46–9–5	Jimmy Sheppard	SD	10	Oct 7, 1946	21 years, 254 days	Rhode Island Auditorium, Providence, Rhode Island, US
59	Win	46–8–5	Charley Padalino	KO	2 (10), 2:09	Aug 19, 1946	21 years, 205 days	Lakefront Stadium, Cleveland, Ohio, US
58	Win	45–8–5	Vic Dellicurti	TKO	10 (10), 1:31	Jul 10, 1946	21 years, 165 days	Ebbets Field, New York City, New York, US
57	Win	44–8–5	Freddie Flores	KO	1 (10)	Jun 24, 1946	21 years, 149 days	Coney Island Velodrome, New York City, New York, US
56	Win	43–8–5	Wilfie Shanks	TKO	3 (10), 1:31	Jun 13, 1946	21 years, 138 days	Fort Hamilton Arena, New York City, New York, US
55	Win	42–8–5	Charley Padalino	TKO	3 (10), 2:00	May 29, 1946	21 years, 123 days	Arena, Cleveland, Ohio, US
54	Win	41–8–5	Jimmy Doyle	TKO	9 (10), 0:57	Mar 11, 1946	21 years, 44 days	Arena, Cleveland, Ohio, US
53	Win	40–8–5	Billy Walker	KO	9 (10)	Jan 14, 1946	20 years, 353 days	Arena, Cleveland, Ohio, US
52	Loss	39–8–5	Sonny Horne	UD	10	Dec 7, 1945	20 years, 315 days	Madison Square Garden, New York City, New York, US
51	Win	39–7–5	Ray Rovelli	KO	7 (8), 1:54	Sep 28, 1945	20 years, 245 days	Fort Hamilton Arena, New York City, New York, US
50	Win	38–7–5	Sonny Horne	TKO	5 (10)	Aug 31, 1945	20 years, 217 days	Madison Square Garden, New York City, New York, US
49	Loss	37–7–5	Jerry Fiorello	UD	10	Jul 24, 1945	20 years, 179 days	MacArthur Stadium, New York City, New York, US
48	Win	37–6–5	Marvin Bryant	TKO	10 (10), 0:22	Jul 12, 1945	20 years, 167 days	Fort Hamilton Arena, New York City, New York, US
47	Win	36–6–5	Joe Bennett	UD	8	Apr 24, 1945	20 years, 88 days	Broadway Arena, New York City, New York, US
46	Win	35–6–5	Cosby Linson	PTS	10	Apr 19, 1945	20 years, 83 days	U.S.O. Auditorium, Norfolk, Virginia, US
45	Win	34–6–5	Willie Watkins	TKO	4 (8)	Apr 4, 1945	20 years, 68 days	Arena, Cleveland, Ohio, US
44	Win	33–6–5	Lou Miller	KO	2 (10)	Mar 29, 1945	20 years, 62 days	Casino, Fall River, Massachusetts, US
43	Win	32–6–5	Lew Perez	TKO	4 (10)	Mar 8, 1945	20 years, 41 days	Casino, Fall River, Massachusetts, US
42	Win	31–6–5	Ray Rovelli	PTS	10	Aug 17, 1944	19 years, 204 days	Fort Hamilton Arena, New York City, New York, US
41	Win	30–6–5	Joe Agosta	TKO	5 (8), 0:40	Jun 22, 1944	19 years, 148 days	Fort Hamilton Arena, New York City, New York, US
40	Loss	29–6–5	Lou Bass	PTS	9	May 26, 1944	19 years, 121 days	U.S.O. Auditorium, Norfolk, Virginia, US
39	Loss	29–5–5	Reuben Shank	PTS	10	Jan 14, 1944	18 years, 353 days	U.S.O. Auditorium, Norfolk, Virginia, US
38	Win	29–4–5	Harold Gary	PTS	6	Jul 20, 1943	18 years, 175 days	MacArthur Stadium, New York City, New York, US
37	Loss	28–4–5	Freddie Flores	PTS	8	Mar 15, 1943	18 years, 48 days	St. Nicholas Arena, New York City, New York, US
36	Draw	28–3–5	Freddie Flores	PTS	6	Mar 5, 1943	18 years, 38 days	Madison Square Garden, New York City, New York, US
35	Win	28–3–4	Frankie Young	UD	10	Feb 11, 1943	18 years, 16 days	Casino, Fall River, Massachusetts, US
34	Loss	27–3–4	Larry Fontana	PTS	6	Feb 5, 1943	18 years, 10 days	Madison Square Garden, New York City, New York, US
33	Win	27–2–4	Gene Johnson	PTS	6	Jan 27, 1943	18 years, 1 day	Scott Hall, Elizabeth, New Jersey, US
32	Win	26–2–4	Tony Grey	TKO	5 (10)	Jan 21, 1943	17 years, 360 days	Casino, Fall River, Massachusetts, US
31	Draw	25–2–4	Frankie Young	PTS	10	Jan 7, 1943	17 years, 346 days	Casino, Fall River, Massachusetts, US
30	Win	25–2–3	Frankie McDougall	UD	10	Dec 10, 1942	17 years, 318 days	Casino, Fall River, Massachusetts, US
29	Win	24–2–3	Tony Pappa	PTS	6	Nov 27, 1942	17 years, 305 days	Masonic Hall, Highland Park, New Jersey, US
28	Loss	23–2–3	Marvin Bryant	PTS	6	Nov 23, 1942	17 years, 301 days	Laurel Garden, Newark, New Jersey, US
27	Win	23–1–3	Frankie McDougall	PTS	10	Nov 19, 1942	17 years, 297 days	Casino, Fall River, Massachusetts, US
26	Win	22–1–3	Joe Snedeker	PTS	6	Nov 13, 1942	17 years, 291 days	Masonic Hall, Highland Park, New Jersey, US
25	Win	21–1–3	Charlie 'Petey' Smith	TKO	2 (6)	Nov 5, 1942	17 years, 283 days	Scott Hall, Elizabeth, New Jersey, US
24	Win	20–1–3	Al Evans	KO	6 (8)	Jul 30, 1942	17 years, 185 days	Casino, Fall River, Massachusetts, US
23	Win	19–1–3	Eddie Costantino	PTS	6	Jul 16, 1942	17 years, 171 days	Fort Hamilton Arena, New York City, New York, US
22	Draw	18–1–3	Benny Deans	PTS	6	Jul 9, 1942	17 years, 164 days	Twin City Bowl, Elizabeth, New Jersey, US
21	Draw	18–1–2	Buddy Farrell	PTS	6	Jun 25, 1942	17 years, 150 days	Twin City Bowl, Elizabeth, New Jersey, US
20	Win	18–1–1	Oscar Suggs	RTD	5 (6)	Jun 18, 1942	17 years, 143 days	Casino, Fall River, Massachusetts, US
19	Win	17–1–1	Danny Nobrega	KO	5 (6)	May 28, 1942	17 years, 122 days	Casino, Fall River, Massachusetts, US
18	Win	16–1–1	Bobby Hall	KO	1 (6)	May 14, 1942	17 years, 108 days	Scott Hall, Elizabeth, New Jersey, US
17	Win	15–1–1	Buddy Farrell	PTS	6	Apr 30, 1942	17 years, 94 days	Scott Hall, Elizabeth, New Jersey, US
16	Win	14–1–1	Jack Garrity	TKO	2 (6)	Apr 16, 1942	17 years, 80 days	Scott Hall, Elizabeth, New Jersey, US
15	Win	13–1–1	Tom Collins	TKO	2 (4)	Apr 14, 1942	17 years, 78 days	Auditorium, Hartford, Connecticut, US
14	Win	12–1–1	Buddy Farrell	PTS	6	Apr 1, 1942	17 years, 65 days	Scott Hall, Elizabeth, New Jersey, US
13	Win	11–1–1	Willie Bush	KO	2 (6)	Mar 12, 1942	17 years, 45 days	Scott Hall, Elizabeth, New Jersey, US
12	Loss	10–1–1	Tony Pappa	PTS	6	Feb 6, 1942	17 years, 11 days	Masonic Hall, Highland Park, New Jersey, US
11	Win	10–0–1	Sammy Mancuso	TKO	3 (6)	Jan 29, 1942	17 years, 3 days	Scott Hall, Elizabeth, New Jersey, US
10	Win	9–0–1	Don Sandham	KO	4 (6)	Jan 22, 1942	16 years, 361 days	Scott Hall, Elizabeth, New Jersey, US
9	Win	8–0–1	Steve Bilko	KO	3 (6)	Jan 8, 1942	16 years, 347 days	Scott Hall, Elizabeth, New Jersey, US
8	Win	7–0–1	Billy Miller	KO	5 (6)	Jan 6, 1942	16 years, 345 days	Grotto Auditorium, Jersey City, New Jersey, US
7	Win	6–0–1	Tommy Milton	TKO	2 (6)	Dec 26, 1941	16 years, 334 days	Scott Hall, Elizabeth, New Jersey, US
6	Win	5–0–1	Moishe Goldstein	KO	1 (6)	Dec 15, 1941	16 years, 323 days	Laurel Garden, Newark, New Jersey, US
5	Win	4–0–1	Freddie Conn	KO	2 (4)	Dec 11, 1941	16 years, 319 days	Scott Hall, Elizabeth, New Jersey, US
4	Win	3–0–1	Paulie Wilson	PTS	8	Dec 1, 1941	16 years, 309 days	Laurel Garden, Newark, New Jersey, US
3	Win	2–0–1	Joe Snedeker	KO	2 (4)	Nov 21, 1941	16 years, 299 days	Masonic Hall, Highland Park, New Jersey, US
2	Draw	1–0–1	Joe Snedeker	NWS	4	Nov 7, 1941	16 years, 285 days	Masonic Hall, Highland Park, New Jersey, US
1	Win	1–0	Carl Jones	KO	2 (4)	May 23, 1941	16 years, 117 days	Fort Hamilton Arena, New York City, New York, US

== See also ==
- List of select Jewish boxers
