= Sonny Horne =

American boxer (1924–1959)

George "Sonny" Horne (January 3, 1924 – September 27, 1959) was a professional boxer in the 1940s who faced off against opponents such as Rocky Graziano, Kid Gavilán, Pete Mead, and Artie Levine. An outstanding defensive boxer, Horne lost only 10 bouts and fought one draw in 121 professional fights.

== Early years ==
Horne grew up in a working-class Irish-American family in Niles, Ohio, a town located in the industrial region of the Mahoning Valley. He began his amateur boxing career in the late 1930s, under the guidance of local trainer and police chief Matt McGowan. By the time he was 17 years old, the fighter had already established an impressive amateur career. By 1941, he had won several Golden Glove titles and was considered one of the most promising amateurs in his weight class in the country. In the late 1940s, Horne relocated to New York City to establish a professional career.

== Professional career ==
Horne won 24 of his first 26 professional fights and lost only six of his first 50. While he fought many of the leading boxers of his day, including Bobby Dykes and Tommy Bell, Horne is best known for three matches with the legendary Rocky Graziano. He first stepped into the ring with Graziano in New York on January 18, 1946, losing in the 10th round. Horne faced Graziano again on April 5, 1948, and a final time on December 6, 1949. In both cases, he lost in the 10th round. Horne also faced middleweight contender Pete Mead, losing a bout in 1946, but defeating Mead in a rematch the following year. In the late 1940s, he was knocked out by Artie Levine.

== Illness and death ==
Horne's career came to a tragic end when he was diagnosed with Lou Gehrig's disease in the late 1940s. He succumbed to the chronic illness in 1959. His accomplishments were remembered in his native Ohio, where Horne was the first person to be inducted into the Trumbull County, Ohio and Area Boxers Hall of Fame. Horne's daughter, Marilyn Horne Nickell, was on hand for the induction ceremony. Among the local celebrity boxers who attended the ceremony was former IBF lightweight champion Harry Arroyo.
