= Hugh Sheridan (boxer) =

New Zealand boxer

Personal information
- Full name: Hugh Mervyn Sheridan
- Born: 6 October 1920
- Died: 11 July 2005 (aged 84); New Plymouth, New Zealand
- Spouse: Felicia Ngaroma Russell (m. 1943; died 1996)

Sport
- Country: New Zealand
- Sport: Amateur boxing

Achievements and titles
- National finals: Flyweight champion (1937)

Hugh Mervyn Sheridan (6 October 1920 – 11 July 2005) was a New Zealand amateur boxer, who represented his country at the 1938 British Empire Games, and won one national amateur title in the flyweight division.

== Biography ==
Born on 6 October 1920, Sheridan was the only son of Clarence and Eliza May Sheridan (née Banks).

Sheridan won the New Zealand amateur flyweight boxing title in 1937, and was duly selected to represent New Zealand in the same division at the 1938 British Empire Games. In his opening bout, he came up against the 18-year-old South African schoolboy, Johannes Joubert, who outboxed Sheridan throughout what was said to be a lively encounter. Joubert went on to win the gold medal.

Sheridan served in the Royal New Zealand Navy during World War II. In 1943, he became engaged to Felicia Ngaroma Russell, and they subsequently married.

Sheridan died in New Plymouth on 11 July 2005, having been predeceased by his wife in 1996, and was buried with her at Awanui Cemetery.
