= Joe Gagnon =

Canadian boxer (1918–2001)

Personal information
- Nationality: (Canada) Canadian
- Born: Raoul Gagnon; 1918 Montreal, Quebec, Canada
- Died: January 13, 2001 (aged 82–83) Montreal, Quebec, Canada
- Weight: Flyweight; Bantamweight

Boxing career
- Stance: Southpaw
Medal record
Men's Boxing
Representing Canada
British Empire Games
Silver medal – second place	1938 Sydney	Flyweight

Joe Gagnon (1918 – January 13, 2001) was a Canadian amateur and professional boxer in the flyweight and bantamweight categories. He won national amateur boxing titles in both weight classes.

== Early life ==
Raoul (Joey) Gagnon was born in 1918 in Montreal, Quebec, Canada.

== Amateur boxing career ==
He took up amateur boxing at age 15 in 1933 at the Griffintown Boys' Club. Canadian professional bantamweight champion Bobby Leitham discovered him that year while Gagnon was training six boys for the city championships—four of whom reached the finals. In 1934, he helped Leitham prepare for his upcoming bout with Sixto Escobar by working on his speed. Leitham recruited Gagnon to his St. Willibrord's Club, where he fought for three years and won a few minor titles.

He joined Billy Zed at University Settlement in 1936, going unbeaten in the flyweight division. The following season, he swept the 112-pound division at the city, provincial, and national levels. After establishing himself as Quebec's provincial flyweight champion in April 1937, Gagnon ascended to national prominence by claiming the Canadian amateur flyweight title in May 1937.

Gagnon was selected to represent Canada at the Empire Games in December 1937. At 20, Joe Gagnon secured a silver medal at the 1938 British Empire Games in Sydney, defeating Scotsman Hugh Cameron in the semi-final but losing to Johnny Joubert of South Africa in the final.

After competing in Australia, he transitioned to the bantamweight class upon his return to Canada. He became the 1938 Quebec Golden Gloves bantamweight champion. While adjusting to the heavier weight class, he failed in his bid for the bantamweight crown at the Canadian amateur boxing championships in Winnipeg in May 1938.

In October 1938, Gagnon fought U.S. featherweight Golden Gloves champion Sugar Ray Robinson, later a world champion, during Robinson's visit to Montreal, which stands among his eight losses. He went the distance of five rounds with Robinson but was severely cut on the lip in the first round, recording his first international loss.

He captured the 1939 Quebec Golden Gloves title at 118 pounds in April 1939. The provincial titleholder went on to win the bantamweight title at the Canadian amateur boxing championship in 1939.

Gagnon secured back-to-back Quebec Golden Gloves titles, taking the 112-pound division crown in May 1940.

His amateur career included numerous memorable victories, headlined by his 1940 win against Johnny Greco, a bout in which he gave away 15 pounds to his heavier opponent. He also recorded wins against Jerry Blanchard, Fernando Gagnon, and Danny Webb.

In 1944, he held the rank of lieutenant in the Canadian Army, serving as Lt. Raoul Gagnon and instructing both platoon duties and boxing while stationed at St. Jerome, Quebec. That year, he competed in the open bantamweight class of the Canadian Army boxing championships. He defeated Gnr. Bobby Parker by decision in the final at Ottawa, where Canadian Defence Minister James Ralston presented him with a gold statuette. The Canadian Army bantamweight champion fought his last fight as an amateur in August 1944.

In 125 career bouts, Gagnon amassed a 117-8 record with 55 wins by knockout. Notably, he never suffered a knockout loss throughout his time in the ring.

== Professional career ==
Following four and a half years of service in the Canadian Army, he entered the professional boxing ranks during the summer of 1944. His preparation was guided by Sylvio Mireault, the ex-Canadian lightweight champion, along with his amateur coach Billy Zed, who supervised training and conditioning.

He scored a TKO victory over Ron Kingston in Soho, London, in April 1945 and then traveled to Ghent, Belgium, to fight on May 11, 1945, where he was outpointed by Tim Mahoney.

He compiled a brief pro career before hanging up his gloves.

== Life after boxing ==
Gagnon became a boxing coach at Palestre Nationale of Montreal in 1957.

== Personal life ==
He had an older brother named Babe Gagnon who was also a boxer.

== Death ==
Joe Gagnon died on January 13, 2001, in Sainte-Anne-de-Bellevue, Quebec, Canada, at 82.

== Legacy ==
He ranks among the greatest amateur boxers to emerge from Montreal.

In 1997, he was inducted into the Canadian Boxing Hall of Fame.
