= Alf Harper =

Boxer who competed for England

Alfred Harper
Personal information
- Nationality: British (English)
- Born: 19 December 1914
- Died: 1983 (aged 68–69)

Sport
- Sport: Boxing
- Event: Featherweight
- Club: Aston ABC

Alfred Harper (19 December 1914 – 1983) was a male boxer who competed for England.

== Biography ==
Harper won the 1937 Amateur Boxing Association British featherweight title, when boxing out of the Aston ABC.

The following year Harper represented England in the 57 kg division at the 1938 British Empire Games in Sydney, Australia.

Harper was also selected to compete in the featherweight tournament at the 1936 Summer Olympics, but he did not start the event.

He was a mechanic by trade and lived in Ingleby Street, Spring Hill, Birmingham during 1938.
