= Hugh Cameron (boxer) =

Scottish boxer

Personal information
- Nationality: British (Scottish)
- Born: C.1918 Scotland

Sport
- Sport: Boxing
- Event: Flyweight
- Club: Port Glasgow AAC
Medal record
Boxing
Representing Scotland
British Empire Games
Bronze medal – third place	1938 Sydney	flyweight

Hugh MacDonald Cameron (c.1918) was a boxer who competed for Scotland and won a bronze medal at the British Empire Games.

== Biography ==
Cameron was best known for representing the Scottish team, where he won the bronze medal in the flyweight division at the 1938 British Empire Games in Sydney, Australia, losing to eventual silver medallist Joe Gagnon in the semi-final.

He boxed out of the Port Glasgow AAC.

At the time of the 1938 Games, he was an apprentice driller and living at 18 Port Glasgow Road, Greenock.
