= Andrew Tsirindonis =

Rhodesian boxer

Medal record
Men's Boxing
Representing Southern Rhodesia
British Empire Games
Bronze medal – third place	1938 Sydney	Welterweight

Andrew Tsirindonis is a former boxer who competed in the 1938 British Empire Games in Sydney, Australia, representing Southern Rhodesia. He won bronze in the welterweight division after winning his bronze medal fight over Norman Dawson of Canada. Previously, Tsirindonis defeated Jack Hahn of South Africa in a quarter-final contest before losing his semi-final bout to Darcy Heeney of New Zealand.

== See also ==
- Commonwealth Games
