= Rocky Graziano =

American boxer (1919–1990)

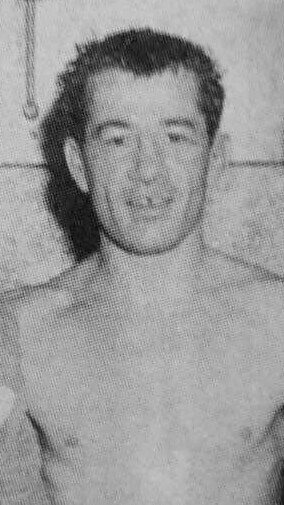
- Graziano, 1940s

Personal information
- Nickname: The Rock / Rocky / Rockaby
- Born: Thomas Rocco Barbella; January 1, 1919 New York City, U.S.
- Died: May 22, 1990 (aged 71) New York City, U.S.
- Resting place: Locust Valley Cemetery, Locust Valley, New York
- Height: 5 ft 7 in (1.70 m)
- Weight: Welterweight; Middleweight

Boxing career
- Reach: 68 1/2 in (174 cm)
- Stance: Orthodox

Boxing record
- Total fights: 83
- Wins: 67
- Win by KO: 52
- Losses: 10
- Draws: 6

Thomas Rocco Barbella (January 1, 1919 – May 22, 1990), better known as Rocky Graziano, was an American professional boxer and actor who competed in the Welterweight and Middleweight divisions. He held the lineal World Middleweight title from 1947 to 1948.

Graziano is considered one of the greatest knockout artists in boxing history, often displaying the capacity to take his opponent out with a single punch. He was ranked 23rd on The Ring magazine list of the greatest punchers of all time. He fought many of the best middleweights of the era including Sugar Ray Robinson.

He was the subject of the 1956 film, Somebody Up There Likes Me, based on his 1955 autobiography, starring Paul Newman as Graziano.

== Early life and amateur career ==
Graziano was born on New Year's Day, 1919, the son of Ida Scinto and Nicola Barbella. The elder Barbella, nicknamed Fighting Nick Bob, was a boxer with a brief fighting record. Born in Brooklyn, New York City, Rocky later moved to an Italian enclave centered on East 10th Street, between First Avenue and Avenue A in Manhattan's East Village. He grew up as a street fighter and learned to look after himself before he could read or write. He spent years in reform school, jail, and Catholic protectories. Barbella Sr., who got occasional work as a horseback rider, kept boxing gloves around the house and encouraged Rocky and his brothers to fight one another. When he was three years old, Barbella would make Rocky and his brother, Joe (three years his senior), fight almost every night. At age 18 Rocky won the Metropolitan A.A.U. welterweight championship. Despite the fame and money that professional fighting seemed to offer, Rocky did not want to become a serious prize fighter. He did not like the discipline of training any more than he liked the discipline of school or the Army.

Graziano heard from a couple of his friends about a tournament going on with a gold medal for the winner. He fought four matches and ended up winning the New York Metropolitan Amateur Athletic Union Boxing Competition (1939). He sold the gold medal for $15 and decided that boxing was a good way to make cash.

=== Military service and criminal history ===
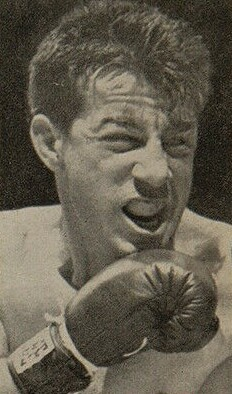
Graziano, undated

In 1940, just weeks into his amateur fighting career, Graziano was arrested for stealing from a school. He went to Coxsackie Correctional Facility, where he spent three weeks with boyhood friend Jake LaMotta, and then he went on to the New York City Reformatory, where he spent five months. After he got out of the reformatory, he headed back to the gym to earn money, and while there met Eddie Cocco who started his professional career. He entered the ring under the name Robert Barber. A couple of weeks later, Graziano was charged with a probation violation and sent back to reform school where he was charged with starting a minor riot. He was then sent to Rikers Island.

When Graziano got out of jail, he was drafted into the U.S. Army and went AWOL after punching a captain. He escaped from Fort Dix in New Jersey and started his real boxing career under the name of "Rocky Graziano." He won his first couple of bouts. After gaining popularity under the name of Graziano, he was found by the Army. After his fourth bout, he was called into a manager's office to speak with a couple of military personnel. Expecting to be prosecuted and sent back to the Army or jail, he fled, but he returned to the Army a week later. In 1941, he surrendered himself, was court-martialed and dishonorably discharged from the Army, then sent to the Federal Penitentiary (nicknamed the "Big Top" for its dome), founded in 1875 as a military prison (now known as USP Leavenworth). Fort Leavenworth is where Rocky Graziano started his boxing career while housed at the FCP (minimum/low) building adjacent to the main facility.

Ultimately he was pardoned and given the opportunity to fight under the Army's authority.

== Professional career ==
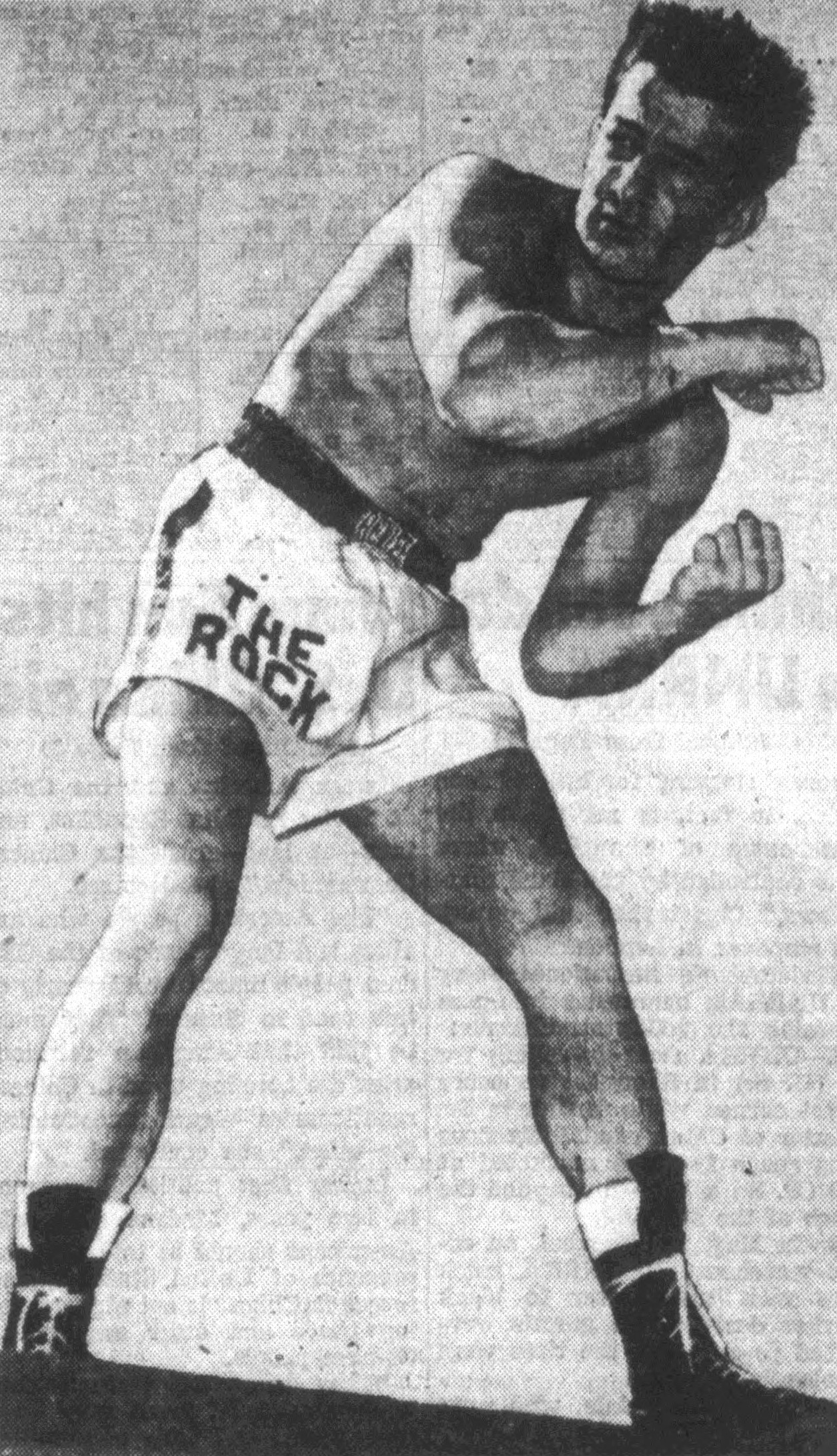
Graziano, circa 1946

Around the time he absconded from military service, Barbella began boxing under the management of Irving Cohen, a relationship that would endure for the remainder of his professional career. Cohen arranged a debut bout and billed the young fighter under his grandfather's surname as Rocky Graziano. Despite his notoriously lax approach to training, Graziano leveraged his untutored, brawling style and powerful punching ability to win by knockout. Cohen scheduled fights against increasingly challenging opponents with the apparent goal of overmatching Graziano to teach him the value of conditioning. He even demanded a match against Sugar Ray Robinson.

In March 1945 at Madison Square Garden in New York City Graziano scored a major upset over Billy Arnold, whose style was similar to that of Sugar Ray Robinson: he was a slick boxer with lightning-fast combinations and a knockout punch. The Ring magazine and various newspapers across the United States touted Arnold as the next Joe Louis or Sugar Ray Robinson. Arnold was a heavy favorite to defeat Graziano and to then fight for the world title. Graziano absorbed a beating in the early going, before going on to batter and knock out Arnold in the third round of the scheduled eight-round bout. Following his loss to Graziano, Arnold was never the same.

Graziano fought three middleweight title bouts against Tony Zale, losing the first before capturing then surrendering the championship.

In their first match (September 27, 1946), after flooring Graziano in the first round, Zale took a savage beating from him and was on the verge of losing the fight by TKO. However, Zale rallied and knocked him out in the sixth round to retain his title.

The rematch, a year later in Chicago (July 16, 1947), was a mirror image of their first fight. The referee almost stopped the second fight in the third round because of a severe cut over Graziano's left eye, but Graziano's cutman, Morris ("Whitey") Bimstein, was able to stop the bleeding. Battered around the ring, his eye closed and appearing ready to lose by a knockout, Graziano rallied to knock Zale out in the sixth, earning the title.

Their last fight was held in New Jersey June 10, 1948. Zale regained his crown, winning the match by a knockout in the third round. The knockout blows consisted of a perfect combination of a right to Graziano's body, then a left hook to his jaw, knocking him unconscious.

Graziano's last shot at the middleweight title came against Sugar Ray Robinson in April 1952. He dropped Robinson to his knee with a right in the third round. Less than a minute later, Robinson KO'd him with a right to the jaw.

Graziano retired after losing his very next fight, a 10-round decision to Chuck Davey.

== Suspensions ==
In 1946, Graziano was suspended by the New York State Athletic Commission (NYSAC) for failure to report a bribe attempt. In 1948 Graziano was suspended for "running out" on a scheduled December 1 bout with Ruben Shank. Abe Green, then-National Boxing Association's President, announced that they were indefinitely suspending him in all parts of the world under NBA supervision, following similar action by the California State Athletic Commission. The suspension covered all of the American States, Great Britain, the European Boxing Federation, Cuba, Mexico, and Canada. Boxing promoter Ralph Tribuani got him a license to box in Delaware, which led to his reinstatement by both the NBA and NYSAC and Rocky's return to the ring.

== Post-boxing career ==
After his retirement from boxing, Graziano cohosted a short-lived series, The Henny and Rocky Show (1955) with famous comedian Henny Youngman. He was a semi-regular on The Martha Raye Show, as Raye's boyfriend. He appeared as a regular on the United Artists TV series Miami Undercover for its entire run, and appeared in several series and shows, including The Pat Boone Chevy Showroom, Car 54, Where Are You?, I've Got a Secret, and Naked City. He portrayed Packy, an ex-boxer, in the 1967 film Tony Rome.

In the 1960s, Graziano opened a pizza restaurant, Rocky Graziano's Pizza Ring, on Second Avenue in Kips Bay, Manhattan, creating a modest franchise for the restaurant in the New York City area. He briefly operated a bowling alley in North Babylon, New York.

== Personal life ==
Graziano married Norma Unger, of German-Jewish descent, on August 10, 1943. By all accounts, the two had a very happy marriage, and they remained together until his death from cardiopulmonary failure on May 22, 1990, in New York City at age 71. According to his biographer, Graziano remained faithful to his wife during the entirety of their marriage, something which was not particularly common among celebrities. They had two children, both of whom married and had children. Graziano's funeral was held at St. Patrick's Cathedral. He is interred at the Locust Valley Cemetery along with his wife, who died in 2009.

== Legacy ==
- Graziano is a member of the International Boxing Hall of Fame.
- Graziano was named to Ring magazine's 100 Greatest Punchers of all time.
- In 2007, Graziano was inducted into the Nassau County Sports Hall of Fame.

== Media portrayals ==
Graziano is played by actor Paul Newman in the 1956 film Somebody Up There Likes Me, adapted from his 1955 autobiography.

== Professional boxing record ==
83 fights	67 wins	10 losses
By knockout	52	3
By decision	14	7
By disqualification	1	0
Draws	6	

No.	Result	Record	Opponent	Type	Round, time	Date	Location	Notes
83	Loss	67–10–6	Chuck Davey	UD	10	September 17, 1952	Chicago Stadium, Chicago, Illinois, US	
82	Loss	67–9–6	Sugar Ray Robinson	KO	3 (15), 1:53	April 16, 1952	Chicago Stadium, Chicago, Illinois, US	For NYSAC, NBA, and The Ring middleweight titles
81	Win	67–8–6	Roy Wouters	TKO	1 (10), 2:45	March 27, 1952	Auditorium, Minneapolis, Minnesota, US	
80	Win	66–8–6	Eddie O'Neill	TKO	4 (10), 2:21	February 18, 1952	Jefferson County Armory, Louisville, Kentucky, US	
79	Win	65–8–6	Tony Janiro	TKO	10 (10), 2:45	September 19, 1951	Olympia Stadium, Detroit, Michigan, US	
78	Win	64–8–6	Chuck Hunter	DQ	2 (10)	August 6, 1951	Boston Garden, Boston, Massachusetts, US	
77	Win	63–8–6	Cecil Hudson	TKO	3 (10)	July 10, 1951	Municipal Auditorium, Kansas City, Missouri, US	
76	Win	62–8–6	Freddie Lott	KO	5 (10), 2:17	June 18, 1951	Coliseum, Baltimore, Maryland, US	
75	Win	61–8–6	Johnny Greco	KO	3 (10), 1:56	May 21, 1951	Forum, Montreal, Quebec, Canada	
74	Win	60–8–6	Reuben Jones	KO	3 (10), 1:18	March 19, 1951	Miami Stadium, Miami, Florida, US	
73	Win	59–8–6	Honeychile Johnson	KO	4 (10), 0:48	November 27, 1950	Convention Hall, Philadelphia, Pennsylvania, US	
72	Win	58–8–6	Tony Janiro	UD	10	October 27, 1950	Madison Square Garden, New York City, US	
71	Win	57–8–6	Pete Mead	KO	3 (10)	October 16, 1950	Arena, Milwaukee, Wisconsin, US	
70	Win	56–8–6	Gene Burton	KO	7 (10), 2:10	October 4, 1950	Chicago Stadium, Chicago, Illinois, US	
69	Win	55–8–6	Henry Brimm	KO	4 (10), 2:14	May 16, 1950	Memorial Auditorium, Buffalo, New York, US	
68	Win	54–8–6	Vinnie Cidone	TKO	3 (10), 3:00	May 9, 1950	Arena, Milwaukee, Wisconsin, US	
67	Win	53–8–6	Danny Williams	KO	3 (10), 1:03	April 24, 1950	Arena, New Haven, Connecticut, US	
66	Draw	52–8–6	Tony Janiro	SD	10	March 31, 1950	Madison Square Garden, New York City, US	
65	Win	52–8–5	Joe Curcio	KO	1 (10), 2:21	March 6, 1950	Miami Stadium, Miami, Florida, US	
64	Win	51–8–5	Sonny Horne	MD	10	December 6, 1949	Arena, Cleveland, Ohio, US	
63	Win	50–8–5	Charley Fusari	TKO	10 (10), 2:04	September 14, 1949	Polo Grounds, New York City, US	
62	Win	49–8–5	Joe Agosta	KO	2 (10), 2:19	July 18, 1949	Century Stadium, West Springfield, Massachusetts, US	
61	Win	48–8–5	Bobby Claus	KO	2 (10), 0:46	June 21, 1949	Wilmington Park, Wilmington, Delaware, US	
60	Loss	47–8–5	Tony Zale	KO	3 (15), 1:08	June 10, 1948	Ruppert Stadium, Newark, New Jersey, US	Lost NBA and The Ring middleweight titles
59	Win	47–7–5	Sonny Horne	UD	10	April 5, 1948	Uline Arena, Washington, DC, US	
58	Win	46–7–5	Tony Zale	TKO	6 (15), 2:10	July 17, 1947	Chicago Stadium, Chicago, Illinois, US	Won NBA and The Ring middleweight titles
57	Win	45–7–5	Jerry Fiorello	TKO	5 (10), 2:14	June 16, 1947	Swayne Field, Toledo, Ohio, US	
56	Win	44–7–5	Eddie Finazzo	TKO	1 (10), 2:14	June 10, 1947	Fairgrounds Horse Show Arena, Memphis, Tennessee, US	
55	Loss	43–7–5	Tony Zale	KO	6 (15), 1:43	September 27, 1946	Yankee Stadium, New York City, US	For NYSAC, NBA, and The Ring middleweight titles
54	Win	43–6–5	Marty Servo	TKO	2 (10), 1:52	March 29, 1946	Madison Square Garden, New York City, US	
53	Win	42–6–5	Sonny Horne	UD	10	January 18, 1946	Madison Square Garden, New York City, US	
52	Win	41–6–5	Harold Green	KO	3 (10), 1:49	September 28, 1945	Madison Square Garden, New York City, US	
51	Win	40–6–5	Freddie 'Red' Cochrane	KO	10 (10), 2:37	August 24, 1945	Madison Square Garden, New York City, US	
50	Win	39–6–5	Freddie 'Red' Cochrane	KO	10 (10), 0:16	June 29, 1945	Madison Square Garden, New York City, US	
49	Win	38–6–5	Al 'Bummy' Davis	TKO	4 (10), 0:44	May 25, 1945	Madison Square Garden, New York City, US	
48	Win	37–6–5	Solomon Stewart	KO	4 (10)	April 17, 1945	Uline Arena, Washington, DC, US	
47	Win	36–6–5	Billy Arnold	TKO	3 (8)	March 9, 1945	Madison Square Garden, New York City, US	
46	Loss	35–6–5	Harold Green	MD	10	December 22, 1944	Madison Square Garden, New York City, US	
45	Loss	35–5–5	Harold Green	UD	10	November 3, 1944	Madison Square Garden, New York City, US	
44	Win	35–4–5	Bernie Miller	KO	2 (8), 0:44	October 24, 1944	St. Nicholas Arena, New York City, US	
43	Draw	34–4–5	Danny Kapilow	PTS	10	October 6, 1944	St. Nicholas Arena, New York City, US	
42	Draw	34–4–4	Frankie Terry	PTS	8	September 15, 1944	St. Nicholas Arena, New York City, US	
41	Win	34–4–3	Jerry Fiorello	SD	8	August 14, 1944	Queensboro Arena, New York City, US	
40	Win	33–4–3	Tony Reno	UD	8	July 21, 1944	Fort Hamilton Arena, New York City, US	
39	Win	32–4–3	Frankie Terry	TKO	6 (8)	June 27, 1944	Dexter Park Arena, New York City, US	
38	Win	31–4–3	Larney Moore	TKO	2 (8)	June 7, 1944	MacArthur Stadium, New York City, US	
37	Win	30–4–3	Tommy Mollis	TKO	7 (10)	May 29, 1944	Griffith Stadium, Washington, DC, US	
36	Win	29–4–3	Freddie Graham	KO	3 (8)	May 9, 1944	Turner's Arena, Washington, DC, US	
35	Win	28–4–3	Bobby Brown	KO	5 (10)	April 10, 1944	Turner's Arena, Washington, DC, US	
34	Win	27–4–3	Ray Rovelli	PTS	8	March 14, 1944	Broadway Arena, New York City, US	
33	Win	26–4–3	Harold Gary	PTS	6	March 8, 1944	Scott Hall, Elizabeth, New Jersey, US	
32	Win	25–4–3	Leon Anthony	KO	1 (8)	March 4, 1944	Ridgewood Grove, New York City, US	
31	Win	24–4–3	Nick Calder	KO	4 (6)	February 24, 1944	Masonic Hall, Highland Park, New Jersey, US	
30	Loss	23–4–3	Steve Riggio	PTS	6	February 9, 1944	Madison Square Garden, New York City, US	
29	Win	23–3–3	Phil Enzenga	TKO	5 (8)	January 18, 1944	Westchester County Center, White Plains, New York, US	
28	Win	22–3–3	Jerry Pittro	TKO	1 (6)	January 7, 1944	Madison Square Garden, New York City, US	
27	Win	21–3–3	Harold Gary	PTS	8	January 4, 1944	Grotto Auditorium, Jersey City, New Jersey, US	
26	Win	20–3–3	Milo Theodorescu	TKO	1 (8)	December 27, 1943	Laurel Garden, Newark, New Jersey, US	
25	Win	19–3–3	Charley McPherson	PTS	6	December 6, 1943	St. Nicholas Arena, New York City, US	
24	Win	18–3–3	Freddie Graham	PTS	8	November 30, 1943	Grotto Auditorium, Jersey City, New Jersey, US	
23	Loss	17–3–3	Steve Riggio	PTS	6	November 12, 1943	Madison Square Garden, New York City, US	
22	Draw	17–2–3	Charley McPherson	PTS	6	October 27, 1943	Scott Hall, Elizabeth, New Jersey, US	
21	Win	17–2–2	Jimmy Williams	TKO	2 (6)	October 13, 1943	Scott Hall, Elizabeth, New Jersey, US	
20	Win	16–2–2	Freddie Graham	KO	1 (8)	October 5, 1943	Broadway Arena, New York City, US	
19	Win	15–2–2	George Wilson	PTS	8	September 21, 1943	Broadway Arena, New York City, US	
18	Loss	14–2–2	Joe Agosta	PTS	6	September 10, 1943	Madison Square Garden, New York City, US	
17	Win	14–1–2	Tony Grey	KO	6 (6)	August 24, 1943	Queensboro Arena, New York City, US	
16	Win	13–1–2	Ted Apostoli	PTS	4	August 20, 1943	Madison Square Garden, New York City, US	
15	Win	12–1–2	Charley McPherson	PTS	6	August 12, 1943	Fort Hamilton Arena, New York City, US	
14	Win	11–1–2	Randy Drew	KO	1 (6)	July 27, 1943	Queensboro Arena, New York City, US	
13	Win	10–1–2	George Stevens	KO	1 (6)	July 22, 1943	Fort Hamilton Arena, New York City, US	
12	Win	9–1–2	Johnny Atteley	RTD	2 (6)	July 8, 1943	Fort Hamilton Arena, New York City, US	
11	Win	8–1–2	Frankie Falco	KO	5 (6)	June 24, 1943	Fort Hamilton Arena, New York City, US	
10	Win	7–1–2	Joe Curcio	TKO	4 (6)	June 16, 1943	Twin City Bowl, Elizabeth, New Jersey, US	
9	Win	6–1–2	Gilberto Ramirez Vasquez	KO	1 (6)	June 11, 1943	Fort Hamilton Arena, New York City, US	
8	Draw	5–1–2	Lou Miller	PTS	6	May 25, 1942	St. Nicholas Arena, New York City, US	
7	Win	5–1–1	Godfrey Howell	TKO	4 (4)	May 12, 1942	Broadway Arena, New York City, US	
6	Win	4–1–1	Eddie Lee	KO	4 (4)	May 4, 1942	St. Nicholas Arena, New York City, US	
5	Loss	3–1–1	Charles Ferguson	PTS	4	April 28, 1942	Broadway Arena, New York City, US	
4	Draw	3–0–1	Godfrey Howell	PTS	4	April 20, 1942	St. Nicholas Arena, New York City, US	
3	Win	3–0	Kenny Blackmar	KO	1 (4), 1:50	April 14, 1942	Broadway Arena, New York City, US	
2	Win	2–0	Mike Mastandrea	KO	3 (4), 1:40	April 6, 1942	St. Nicholas Arena, New York City, US	
1	Win	1–0	Curtis Hightower	TKO	2 (4), 0:40	March 31, 1942	Broadway Arena, New York City, US	

== See also ==
- List of middleweight boxing champions

Achievements
Preceded by Tony Zale	World Middleweight Champion; July 16, 1947– June 10, 1948	Succeeded by Tony Zale
