= James Watson (boxer) =

Scottish boxer

Personal information
- Nationality: British (Scottish)
- Born: C.1918 Scotland

Sport
- Sport: Boxing
- Event: Featherweight
- Club: Leith Victoria BC
Medal record
Boxing
Representing Scotland
British Empire Games
Silver medal – second place	1938 Sydney	featherweight

James Watson (c.1918) was a boxer who competed for Scotland and won a silver medal at the British Empire Games.

He was best known for representing the Scottish team, where he won the silver medal in the featherweight division at the 1938 British Empire Games in Sydney, Australia, losing to gold medallist Barney Henricus in the final.

Watson boxed out of the Leith Victoria BC.

At the time of the 1938 Games, he was an apprentice dentist and living at 96 Leith Street, Edinburgh.
