= Harry Hurst =

Canadian boxer (1918–1979)

Personal information
- Nationality: (Canada) Canadian
- Born: Harry Hurst; May 26, 1918 Manchester, United Kingdom of Great Britain and Ireland
- Died: May 15, 1979 (aged 60) Montreal, Quebec, Canada
- Height: 5 ft 6 in (168cm)
- Weight: Lightweight

Boxing career

Boxing record
- Total fights: 68
- Wins: 47
- Win by KO: 29
- Losses: 15
- Draws: 6
Medal record
Men's Boxing
Representing Canada
British Empire Games
Silver medal – second place	1938 Sydney	Lightweight

Harry Hurst (May 26, 1918 – May 15, 1979) was a Canadian boxer who competed in the 1938 British Empire Games.

== Early life ==
Harry Hurst was born in Manchester, United Kingdom of Great Britain and Ireland.

When he was three years old, his parents moved to Notre-Dame-de-Grâce with him.

== Amateur boxing career ==
He started boxing in 1932 in a class taught by Tommy Sullivan at Tremholme Park (French: Parc Trenholme).

He failed to qualify at the 1936 Olympic trials. After moving to St. Catharines, he won the Southwestern Ontario and provincial lightweight titles in 1938, securing a place on Canada's Empire Games team in Vancouver.

At the 1938 British Empire Games in Sydney, he won the silver medal in the lightweight class after losing the final to Harry Groves.

Hurst began boxing out of Montreal athletic clubs. In 1939, he won the Quebec Golden Gloves title at 135 pounds. At the Canadian Amateur Boxing Championships on April 28, 1939, he captured the 135-pound lightweight crown.

== Professional career ==
Hurst transitioned to professional boxing under Maurice Foreman in late 1939 as the reigning national amateur lightweight champion. Hurst opened 1940 with three knockouts at the Maple Leaf Gardens in the first two months before making his U.S. debut. He recorded two knockout victories in Washington, D.C., before moving on to fight at New York's famed Ridgewood Grove Arena.

=== Title match with Dave Castilloux, April 1941 ===
In 1941, he returned to his hometown to compete for the Canadian lightweight boxing championship. On April 22, 1941, Hurst and Canadian welterweight champion Dave Castilloux fought to a 10-round draw in their first Canadian lightweight title bout.

=== Loss against reigning NBA world lightweight champion Sammy Angott, June 1941 ===
Hurst entered his June 1941 bout with NBA lightweight champion Sammy Angott with 23 professional fights. Though he dropped a ten-round decision in the non-title bout, his competitive showing against the world champion significantly elevated his standing in the division. By September, he entered the National Boxing Association's lightweight ratings.

=== Second title match with Dave Castilloux, September 1941 ===
In the Castilloux-Hurst rematch for the lightweight title on September 25, 1941, Hurst lost the 10-round bout at the Montreal Forum by unanimous decision.

He held the ninth position among lightweights in The Ring magazine's 1941 annual ratings.

When he joined the Royal Canadian Air Force in March 1942, Hurst held the number four lightweight ranking globally during World War II. The air force's disapproval of boxing prevented him from fighting throughout his three-and-a-half-year stint as a PT instructor in England, unlike navy or army personnel who could continue developing through service bouts.

Over the span of a month in 1946, Hurst recorded back-to-back wins against Lenny Mancini.

=== Title matches with Johnny Greco, 1947-1948 ===
Hurst competed in two title bouts against defending champion Johnny Greco for the Canadian welterweight championship between 1947 and 1948.

His final ring appearance as a professional came in November 1948 when he faced Peter Zaduk.

Well into his retirement, Hurst accepted an invitation to meet former world champion Tony Zale in an exhibition contest held in Montreal.

== Professional boxing record ==
88 fights	47 wins	35 losses
By knockout	29	1
By decision	18	20
By disqualification	0	14
Draws	6	

== Death ==
Harry Hurst died on May 15, 1979, in Montreal, Quebec, Canada. He was buried in Mount Royal Cemetery.
