= Maurice Dennis =

English boxer

Personal information
- Nationality: British (English)
- Born: 14 November 1913 Camden, London, England
- Died: First quarter 1962 Lambeth, London, England

Sport
- Sport: boxing
Medal record
Boxing
Representing England
British Empire Games
| Silver medal – second place | 1938 Sydney | middleweight |

Maurice Dennis (1913–1962) was an amateur and professional boxer from Camden Town, England. He boxed between 1938 and 1940, and had 14 professional contests.

== Biography ==
Dennis won the 1937 Amateur Boxing Association British middleweight title, when boxing out of the Northampton Polytechnic ABC.

He was a silver medalist in boxing at the 1938 British Empire Games. Denis Reardon, the first boxing gold medalist from Wales at the British Empire Games (now the Commonwealth Games) defeated Maurice Dennis in the middleweight final at the 1938 Sydney games.

He was a totalisator mechanic by trade.
