= Dave Castilloux =

Canadian boxer (1916-1994)

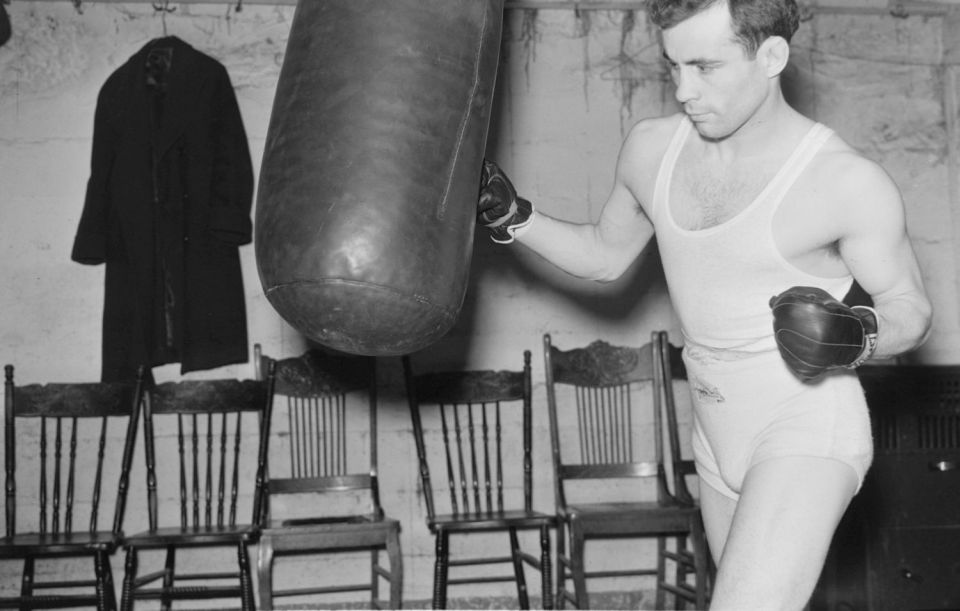

Personal information
- Nationality: (Canada) Canadian
- Born: Dave Castilloux; June 4, 1916 Hope Town, Quebec, Canada
- Died: March 8, 1994 (aged 77) Montreal, Quebec, Canada
- Height: 5 ft 6½ in (169cm)
- Weight: Featherweight; Welterweight; Lightweight

Boxing career

Boxing record
- Total fights: 131
- Wins: 106
- Win by KO: 48
- Losses: 20
- Draws: 4

Dave Castilloux (June 4, 1916 – March 8, 1994) was a Canadian professional featherweight, welterweight, and lightweight boxer who won Canadian titles in three weight classes.

== Early life ==
Dave Castilloux was born on June 4, 1916, in Hope Town, Quebec, Canada.

== Professional boxing career ==
He turned professional in 1934, posting 11 wins, 2 losses, and 4 draws across 17 bouts in his first year alone.

Castilloux left Winslow, Maine, in the mid-1930s, settling in Montreal in search of tougher opponents and better paydays. He debuted in Montreal against Frankie Martin at Delorimier Stadium in November 1935. Castilloux was embraced by Montreal fans as an adopted son of the city. His training in Montreal took place at a gym operated by Romeo St. Amand, who had previously held the Canadian flyweight championship. He was managed by Montreal's Raoul Godbout.

At the Montreal Forum in November 1935, Castilloux fought Maxie Berger for the first time, falling short on the scorecards.

=== Taking the Canadian featherweight championship, May 1938 ===
He defeated Jackie Callura to win the Canadian featherweight crown at the Montreal Forum on May 9, 1938.

In the 1938 annual ratings published by The Ring in its February 1939 issue, Castilloux was ranked as the world's third-best featherweight behind Leo Rodak and Petey Scalzo.

=== Taking the Canadian lightweight championship, June 1939 ===
During a four-bout run at Maple Leaf Gardens, he scored a win against Phil Zwick, then claimed the vacant Canadian lightweight championship by defeating Joey Bagnato, who entered with a 23–1 record, on June 5, 1939.

==== Notable bouts during title reign ====
On June 15, 1939, he secured a sixth-round technical knockout over the experienced Everette Rightmire, followed by a July 1939 unanimous decision win over Leo Rodak.

The New England lightweight crown came into Castilloux's possession in November 1940 when he beat Paul Junior at the Portland Expo Center before a record-setting crowd for Maine boxing. The bout was officiated by legendary former lightweight champion Benny Leonard.

The Ring magazine's 1940 rankings positioned him at number five in the lightweight division worldwide.

Castilloux appeared on two Madison Square Garden cards, most notably facing Aldo Spoldi of Milan, Italy, in January 1941.

In April 1941, he fought to a stalemate with Harry Hurst to retain the Canadian lightweight championship.

=== Loss against reigning NBA world lightweight champion Sammy Angott, May 1941 ===
The Canadian champion lost a decision to NBA world lightweight champion Sammy Angott in May 1941 in Louisville.

=== Taking the Canadian welterweight championship, August 1941 ===
He faced rival Maxie Berger twice during the summer of 1941 and won the first match by unanimous decision. Their immediate rematch was contested for the Canadian welterweight boxing championship, with legendary boxing authority Nat Fleischer as the third man in the ring. Castilloux captured the welterweight title with another unanimous decision victory over Berger on August 20, 1941.

He entered his September 1941 rematch with Harry Hurst as a three-weight Canadian champion, putting his lightweight title on the line. At the time, Castilloux was just 24 years old.

The Canadian titleholder met Lenny Mancini at the Montreal Forum in November 1941, then traveled to Maple Leaf Gardens 13 days later to successfully defend his lightweight championship against Sonny Jones. At the close of 1941, he was ranked fourth among the top five welterweights in the world by The Ring.

Like many boxers of his generation, Castilloux served in the Canadian Army during World War II. He was a sergeant with the Royal Canadian Air Force in 1943.

In Milwaukee in August 1945, he faced Johnny Bratton, who would later capture the NBA welterweight title. Castilloux experienced his first career knockdowns and lost via unanimous decision.

He was ranked seventh among the world's lightweights by The Ring in 1945.

=== Losing the Canadian welterweight championship to Johnny Greco, August 1946 ===
His Canadian welterweight title reign ended on August 28, 1946, with a 10-round decision defeat to Johnny Greco. The bout set a Canadian indoor gate record with 14,750 spectators in attendance and $49,549 in revenue.

=== Losing the Canadian lightweight championship to Danny Webb, October 1946 ===
In October 1946, Castilloux met Danny Webb for the Canadian lightweight crown in front of 7,041 spectators. After damaging his left hand in the first round, he fought on but suffered a majority decision loss, marking back-to-back title fight defeats within a month span. Their April 1947 rematch for the title drew a near-capacity crowd, which he lost by split decision.

Castilloux's final professional bout took place in July 1948 at Montreal's Exchange Stadium, where he dropped a unanimous decision to Gaby Ferland.

Competing in the professional ranks from 1933 to 1948, Castilloux recorded 106 victories against 20 losses and 4 draws, with 48 of his wins coming by knockout.

== Professional boxing record ==
131 fights	106 wins	21 losses
By knockout	48	1
By decision	58	20
Draws	4	

== Life after boxing ==
He went to work for the Canadian National Railway for over 20 years until his retirement around 1977.

== Death ==
Dave Castilloux died on March 8, 1994, in Montreal, Quebec, Canada, at 77.

== Legacy ==
He made history as the first Canadian to simultaneously hold titles in three weight divisions. Castilloux captured Canadian championships at featherweight, welterweight, and lightweight.

He was inducted into Canada's Sports Hall of Fame in 1975. In 1992, he was admitted into the Quebec Sports Hall of Fame.

Achievements
Preceded by Jackie Callura	Canadian Featherweight Champion; May 9, 1938 – June 13, 1944	Succeeded by Gus Mell
Preceded by Vacant	Canadian Lightweight Champion; June 5, 1939 – October 10, 1946	Succeeded by Danny Webb
Preceded by Maxie Berger	Canadian Welterweight Champion; August 20, 1941 – August 28, 1946	Succeeded by Johnny Greco
