= Nick Wolmarans =

South African boxer

Medal record

Men's Boxing

Representing South Africa

British Empire Games
Gold medal – first place	1938 Sydney	Light heavyweight

Nicolaas Wolmarans (5 March 1916 – 17 August 1994) was a South African boxer who competed in the 1938 British Empire Games. He was born in Zastron. In 1938, he won the gold medal in the light heavyweight class after winning the final against Cecil Overell of Australia.
