= Kenneth Moran =

New Zealand boxer

Medal record

Representing New Zealand

Men's Boxing

Commonwealth Games
Bronze medal – third place	1938 Sydney	Featherweight

Kenneth Noel Patrick Moran (c. 1919 – 13 June 1946) was a New Zealand boxer. He won the bronze medal in the men's featherweight division at the 1938 British Empire Games.

He served in the 2nd New Zealand Expeditionary Force during World War II, and in 1942 was taken as a prisoner of war in 1942. He died in Dunedin, Otago and was buried Hillsborough Cemetery, Auckland.
