= Johnny Greco =

Canadian boxer (1923-1954)

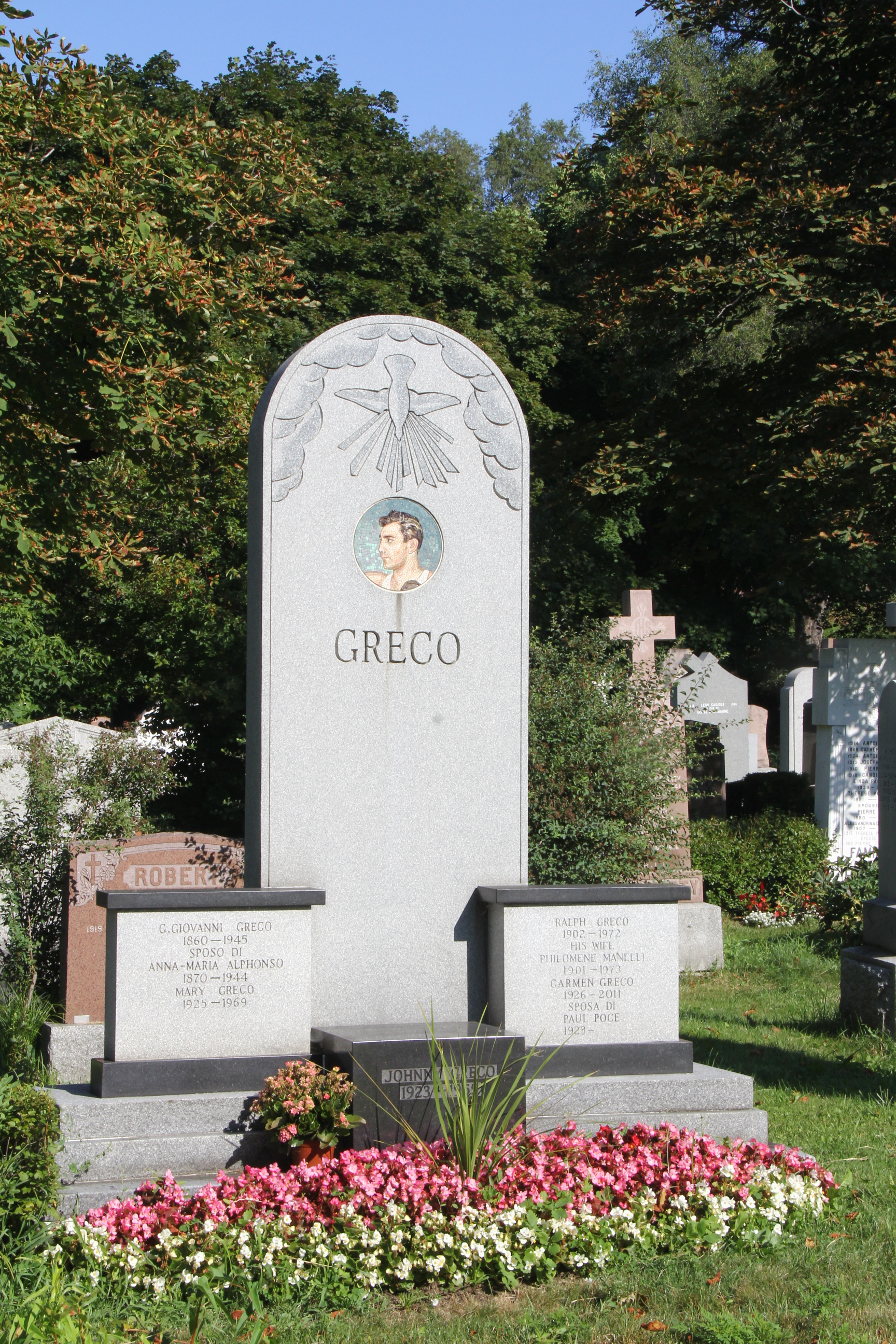

Personal information
- Nickname: Jolting Johnny
- Nationality: (Canada) Canadian
- Born: Johnny Greco; 1923 Montreal, Quebec, Canada
- Died: December 12, 1954 (aged 30–31) Montreal, Quebec, Canada
- Height: 5 ft 5½ in (166cm)
- Weight: Welterweight

Boxing career
- Reach: 66 in (168cm)
- Stance: Orthodox

Boxing record
- Total fights: 102
- Wins: 78
- Win by KO: 43
- Losses: 18
- Draws: 5

Johnny Greco (1923 – 1954) was a Canadian former professional welterweight boxer who won the Canadian welterweight boxing championship in 1946.

== Early life ==
Johnny Greco was born to an Italian family in 1923 in Montreal, Quebec, Canada.

Greco's father was an acrobat who encouraged Johnny's interest in athletics and bought him a set of boxing gloves.

== Amateur boxing career ==
Greco started boxing at age seven, learning the fundamentals at Montreal's Griffintown Boys Club.

As a 14-year-old fighting out of the Crescent Athletic Club, Greco won the first Quebec Golden Gloves novice title in the 108-pound class in 1938. By then, he was known by the moniker "Westmount Flash."

A points victory over Joe Gagnon on an amateur show at Monument-National in November 1939 established him as one of the leading featherweights in the province.

Greco's amateur record consisted of 38 fights, with 22 knockout victories, 13 decision wins, and four losses.

== Professional career ==
The Montreal native's professional boxing debut took place on June 7, 1940, where he registered a technical knockout win. His first manager as a professional was Raoul Godbout, who also oversaw the career of Canadian featherweight and lightweight champion Dave Castilloux. He soon felt pushed aside in favor of Castilloux and sought new management. After parting ways with Godbout, he began working with manager Pit Audette in October 1941.

After advancing through the preliminary ranks in Montreal, Greco moved to New York under Murray Elkins in 1942 and secured a Madison Square Garden date before year's end. He made a statement by knocking out Harold Green at the 1:34 mark of round one, then scoring another first-round knockout over Bill Speary. The back-to-back stoppages elevated Greco to headliner status. He defeated Cleo Shans twice at the Garden in February and March 1943. Soon after, Greco enlisted in the Canadian Army, where he served as a private for about a year before being discharged.

Between 1944 and 1945, he delivered three consecutive fights with Bobby Ruffin. Following his decision victory over Ruffin and their December 1944 draw, Madison Square Garden promoter Mike Jacobs dubbed him the "$200,000 kid." Their first two fights had generated $55,760 and $86,489 at the gate. He lost in the rubber match that was arranged with Ruffin at Madison Square Garden in February 1945.

The Ring magazine placed Greco third among welterweight contenders in its 1944 annual ratings, published in February 1945. He was ranked behind champion Fred Cochrane, Henry Armstrong, and Sugar Ray Robinson.

Greco and Tony Janiro clashed three straight times at Madison Square Garden in 1945, with the Montrealer capturing two victories via unanimous decision.

His 1946 campaign at the Garden included two meetings with former world lightweight champion Beau Jack. In their initial bout on February 8, 1946, Greco pulled off an upset by battling Beau Jack to a 10-round draw. With 18,941 in attendance, the $148,152 gate shattered the Madison Square Garden record at the time, eclipsing the previous record held by Joe Louis and Buddy Baer. Three months later, in May 1946, he lost to Beau Jack by unanimous decision.

=== Taking the Canadian welterweight championship, August 1946 ===
On August 28, 1946, Greco dethroned Dave Castilloux as Canadian welterweight champion, taking a 10-round decision to end Castilloux's five-year title reign. Greco held an 8-pound advantage at 145 pounds to Castilloux's 137½. The bout drew 14,750 spectators and generated $49,549, establishing a new indoor gate record for Canada.

==== Notable bouts during welterweight title reign ====
Greco successfully defended his title for the first time on May 16, 1947, meeting Danny Webb at the Montreal Forum. In Greco's second defense, Harry Hurst challenged for the Canadian welterweight championship on November 3, 1947, with Greco retaining the belt. The two met again on May 18, 1948, with Greco once more emerging victorious.

He disrupted the North American debut of Eric Boon in August 1948.

Greco met Beau Jack for a third time on April 9, 1948, in their first Canadian matchup, with Greco falling short on a majority draw before his home crowd. The series concluded in March 1949 when Greco defeated Jack by unanimous decision in their fourth encounter.

In October 1948, Greco's contract with manager Pit Audette, who also handled Gaby Ferland, expired. He then moved forward with trainer-manager Frankie Doyle guiding his career.

At 26, he fought Laurent Dauthuille at Delorimier Stadium in 1949. The match drew 19,580 fans, generating $76,523, the largest attendance in Canadian boxing history, surpassing the previous record from his 1946 Castilloux championship fight.

Greco defended his title successfully in January 1950, scoring a TKO over Fitzie Pruden at the Montreal Forum, then posted a unanimous decision against Bob Montgomery at the same venue in February. He fell by split decision to Eddie Giosa in Philadelphia in May, then lost to Cuban Kid Gavilán at the Montreal Royals' baseball park in August 1950. Greco rebounded in February 1951 with a victory over Giosa in their rematch, then won back the Canadian welterweight title in March 1951 by TKO'ing Gaby Ferland.

=== Loss against ex-NBA world middleweight champion Rocky Graziano, May 1951 ===
The Canadian champion took on 32-year-old ex-NBA world middleweight champion Rocky Graziano on May 21, 1951. Graziano stopped Greco in three rounds before a crowd of 6,165 at the Montreal Forum.

=== Losing the Canadian welterweight championship to Armand Savoie, July 1952 ===
Following a 4-0-1 run, Greco defended the welterweight title against Armand Savoie, losing a tight split verdict on July 7, 1952.

=== Taking the Canadian welterweight championship, August 1952 ===
He faced Savoie in an immediate rematch a month later on August 26, 1952. He captured the Canadian welterweight championship for the second time.

Greco retired from the ring in 1952 following a 100-plus fight welterweight career, posting a 78-18-5 mark with 43 victories inside the distance.

== Professional boxing record ==
101 fights	78 wins	18 losses
By knockout	43	4
By decision	35	14
Draws	5	

== Death ==
Johnny Greco died on December 12, 1954, in Westmount, Montreal, Quebec, Canada. He was killed in a car accident. He was buried at Notre Dame des Neiges Cemetery.

== Legacy ==
Greco's career extended 14 years and included 14 appearances at Madison Square Garden, 11 of which were main event bouts.

Achievements
Preceded by Dave Castilloux	Canadian Welterweight Champion; August 28, 1946 – July 7, 1952	Succeeded by Armand Savoie
Preceded by Armand Savoie	Canadian Welterweight Champion; August 26, 1952 – August 26, 1952	Succeeded by Rocky Brisebois
