= William Butler (boxer) =

Boxer who competed for England (1916–1996)

Personal information
- Nationality: British (English)
- Born: 17 September 1916
- Died: 1996 (aged 79–80) Coventry, England

Sport
- Sport: Boxing
- Event: Bantamweight
- Club: Standard B.C.
Medal record
Boxing
Representing England
British Empire Games
Gold medal – first place	1938 Sydney	54kg

William Harry Butler (17 September 1916 – 1996) was a boxer who competed for England.

== Biography ==
Butler represented the England team and won a gold medal in the 54 kg division at the 1938 British Empire Games in Sydney, Australia. He boxed out of the Standard B.C.

Butler was an electrician by trade and lived in Stratford Street, Upper Stoke, Coventry in the late 1930s.

Butler died in Coventry in 1996.
