= Joseph Collins (boxer) =

New Zealand boxer (1919–1984)

Personal information
- Full name: Joseph Phillip Collins
- Born: 4 January 1919 Foxton, New Zealand
- Died: 2 March 1984 (aged 65) New Plymouth, New Zealand
- Weight: 60 kg (133 lb)
- Spouse: Sheila Coulton (m. 1945)

Sport
- Country: New Zealand
- Sport: Amateur boxing

Achievements and titles
- National finals: Lightweight champion (1937)

Joseph Phillip Collins (4 January 1919 – 2 March 1984) was a New Zealand amateur boxer, who represented his country at the 1938 British Empire Games, and won one national amateur title.

== Early life and family ==
Born at Foxton on 4 January 1919, Collins was the youngest child of Florence Ada Collins (née Le Masurier) and James William John Collins. On 10 February 1945, he married Sheila Coulton, and the couple went on to have four children.

== Boxing ==
Collins came to national attention as a boxer when he won the New Zealand amateur lightweight title, representing Manawatu, in 1937. In the final, he defeated R. Davey of Gisborne by a knockout in the first round, and was described as the "find" of the tournament.

He then represented his country in the lightweight division of the boxing at the 1938 British Empire Games in Sydney, and was regarding by many as being New Zealand's best hope of winning a boxing title. However, he was defeated in his opening bout.

== Military service ==
During World War II, Collins served as a private in the 2nd New Zealand Expeditionary Force, going overseas with the third echelon infantry reinforcements.

== Death ==
Collins died in New Plymouth on 3 March 1984, and was buried at Te Henui Cemetery.
