= Denis Reardon =

Welsh boxer (1917-2020)

Personal information
- Nationality: British (Welsh)
- Born: 6 July 1917 Cardiff, Wales
- Died: 2010 (aged 93) Cardiff, Wales

Sport
- Sport: Boxing
- Event: Middleweight
Medal record
Boxing
Representing Wales
British Empire Games
Gold medal – first place	1938 Sydney

Denis Patrick Reardon (6 July 1917 – 2010) was a Welsh boxer. He was Wales' first boxing gold medallist at the British Empire Games (now the Commonwealth Games).

== Career and legacy ==
Reardon became the first Welsh winner of a gold medal for boxing at the middleweight boxing in the 1938 British Empire Games in Sydney, Australia.

Representing Wales at the 1938 British Empire Games, Reardon defeated Maurice Dennis in the middleweight final at the games. He was inducted into the Welsh Boxing Hall of Fame in 2008.

At the time of the Games he was an apprentice fitter/engineer and lived at 13 North Luton Place in Cardiff.

== See also ==
- Welsh Sports Hall of Fame
