= Darcy Heeney =

New Zealand boxer and rugby union footballer

Personal information
- Full name: Arthur John Heeney
- Born: 22 April 1916 Gisborne, New Zealand
- Died: 19 December 1941 (aged 25) HMS Neptune, Mediterranean Sea, off Tripoli, Italian Libya
- Relative: Tom Heeney (uncle)

Sport
- Country: New Zealand
- Sport: Amateur boxing

Achievements and titles
- National finals: Welterweight champion (1937, 1938, 1939)
Medal record
Representing New Zealand
Men's Boxing
British Empire Games
Silver medal – second place	1938 Sydney	Welterweight

Arthur John "Darcy" Heeney (22 April 1916 – 19 December 1941) was a New Zealand boxer, who won a silver medal for his country at the 1938 British Empire Games. He died during World War II, when the ship in which he was serving, HMS Neptune, struck enemy mines off the coast of Libya.

== Early life and family ==
Born in Gisborne on 22 April 1916, Heeney was the son of John Henry Heeney and Marguerite Violet Kohi Heeney (née White). He was of Irish and Māori descent, affiliating to the Ngāti Awa iwi. Heeney's father won the New Zealand amateur welterweight boxing title in 1914, and later fought as a professional, while his uncle, Tom Heeney, unsuccessfully challenged Gene Tunney for the world heavyweight title in 1928.

Darcy Heeney was educated St Mary's and Marist Brothers schools in Gisborne, before completing his secondary education at Sacred Heart College, Auckland. He gained the soubriquet "Darcy" at a young age, after the Australian boxer Les Darcy.

== Boxing ==
As a boxer, Heeney was trained by his father and Sam Bardwell. He won the national amateur welterweight title in 1937, 1938, and 1939, becoming the first amateur fighter in New Zealand to defend his title twice consecutively.

Having won the New Zealand title in 1937, Heeney was selected to represent New Zealand in the welterweight division at the 1938 British Empire Games in Sydney. He reached the final, but lost on points to the Australian fighter, Bill Smith.

By February 1940, when Heeney enlisted in the Royal Navy, he had had 27 wins and five losses in his 32 amateur fights.

== Other sports ==
Heeney was an accomplished rugby union player, and captained the Poverty Bay Colts team from halfback. In 1938 and 1939, he captained the Marist club team, winning the Poverty Bay senior championship in 1939. Heeney was described as an "all-round field athlete and swimmer", and "useful cyclist".

== World War II service and death ==
Following his enlistment in the Royal New Zealand Navy in February 1940, Heeney travelled to England and qualified as an engine room artificer, before serving in destroyers. In early 1941, he transferred to the aircraft carrier HMS Ark Royal, and later that year to the cruiser HMS Neptune. He was killed in action on 19 December 1941 when the Neptune struck four mines about 20 miles from Tripoli.

== Legacy ==
In 2014, Heeney was inducted into the Sport Gisborne Legends of Sport hall of fame.
