= Blair Richardson =

Canadian boxer

Personal information
- Born: 29 January 1941 Canada
- Died: 6 March 1971 (aged 30) Boston, Massachusetts, U.S.
- Height: 5 ft 10 in (1.78 m)
- Weight: light middle/middle/light heavyweight

Boxing career
- Stance: Orthodox

Boxing record
- Total fights: 52
- Wins: 45 (KO 36)
- Losses: 5 (KO 3)
- Draws: 2

Blair Richardson (29 January 1941 – 6 March 1971) was a Canadian professional light middle/middle/light heavyweight boxer of the 1950s and 1960s who won the Maritime Middleweight Title, Canada middleweight title, and Commonwealth middleweight title, his professional fighting weight varied from 154 lb (70 kg; 11 st 0 lb), i.e. middleweight to 167 lb (76 kg; 11 st 13 lb), i.e. light heavyweight, he was managed by Jimmy Nemis, Johnny Buckley, Johnny Buckley Jr., and trained by Al Lacey, Charlie Pappas, and Johnny Sullo. Richardson was an alumnus of Emerson College, Boston, Massachusetts where he gained bachelor and master of science degrees in speech (minors in sociology and theology), after his retirement from boxing, he taught speech and the finer points of boxing at Northeastern University, Boston, Massachusetts for two years before joining the faculty at Emerson College in 1970, he was also a member of the Fellowship of Christian Athletes, and several speech organizations. He died at New England Deaconess Hospital in Boston, Massachusetts following a surgery for a brain tumor. Richardson was inducted into the Nova Scotia Sport Hall of Fame in 1980.

== Genealogical information ==
Richardson was the husband of Beverly (née MacDowell), who was expecting their first child, Lisa Richardson, at the time of his death.
