= Barney Henricus =

Sri Lankan boxer

Ansdale "Barney" William Henricus
- Born: Ceylon
- Died: United States
- Police career
- Allegiance: (Sri Lanka) Ceylon
- Department: Ceylon Police Force
- Service years: 1934 to 1967
- Rank: Chief inspector

Barney Henricus
Medal record

Men's Boxing

Representing Ceylon

British Empire Games
Gold medal – first place	1938 Sydney	Featherweight

Ansdale "Barney" William Henricus (June 22, 1915 – May 7, 2007) was a Ceylonese sportsman and police officer. As a boxer he competed in the 1938 British Empire Games, where he won the gold medal in the featherweight class after winning the final against James Watson from Scotland.

Henricus was born in Colombo and was educated at Royal College, Colombo. He joined the Ceylon Police Force as a Sub Inspector and served for 33 years before retiring as a Chief inspector. He emigrated to the United States in 1988. He died in Escondido, California.

His brothers were Major Basil Henricus, Captain George Henricus of the Ceylon Army, Alan Henricus, a former Lieutenant in the Royal Ceylon Navy and Derrick Henricus.
