= Harry Groves =

English boxer (1918–1997)

Personal information
- Nationality: British (English)
- Born: 2 March 1918 Wandsworth, London, England
- Died: 24 December 1997 (aged 79) London, England

Sport
- Sport: Boxing
- Event: Lightweight
- Club: Watneys ABC, Devas BC
Medal record
Boxing
Representing England
British Empire Games
Gold medal – first place	1938 Sydney	60kg

Harry George Thomas Groves (2 March 1918 – 24 December 1997) was a male boxer who competed for England.

== Biography ==
Groves represented England and won a gold medal in the 60 kg division at the 1938 British Empire Games in Sydney, Australia.

He won the 1939 Amateur Boxing Association British lightweight title, when boxing out of the Devas ABC.

He boxed out of Watneys ABC and Devas BC. and at the time of the 1938 Games he was a brewers drayman by trade and lived in Condell Road, Battersea.
