= 1916 in New Zealand =

- Decades: 1890s; 1900s; 1910s; 1920s; 1930s
- See also: History of New Zealand; List of years in New Zealand; Timeline of New Zealand history

The following lists events that happened during 1916 in New Zealand.

== Incumbents ==
=== Regal and viceregal ===
- Head of State – George V
- Governor – Arthur Foljambe, 2nd Earl of Liverpool
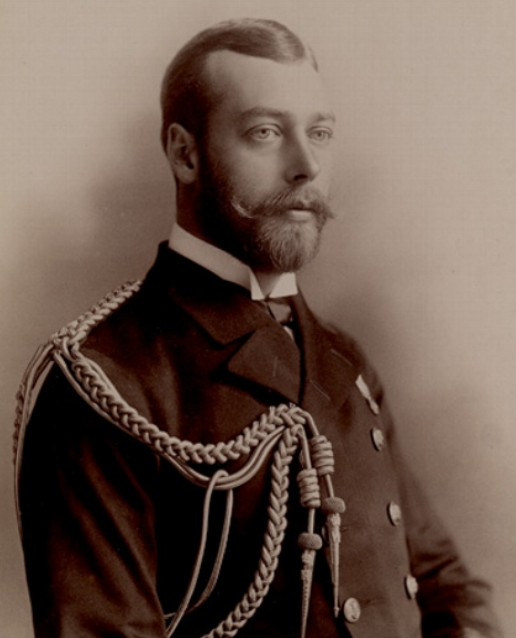
George V

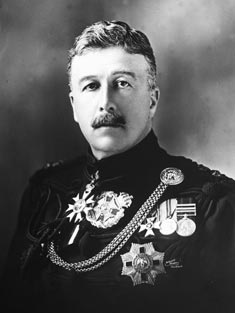
Lord Liverpool

=== Government ===
The 19th New Zealand Parliament continued as a grand coalition led by the Reform Party.

- Speaker of the House – Frederic Lang (Reform Party)
- Prime Minister – William Massey (Reform Party)
- Minister of Finance – Joseph Ward
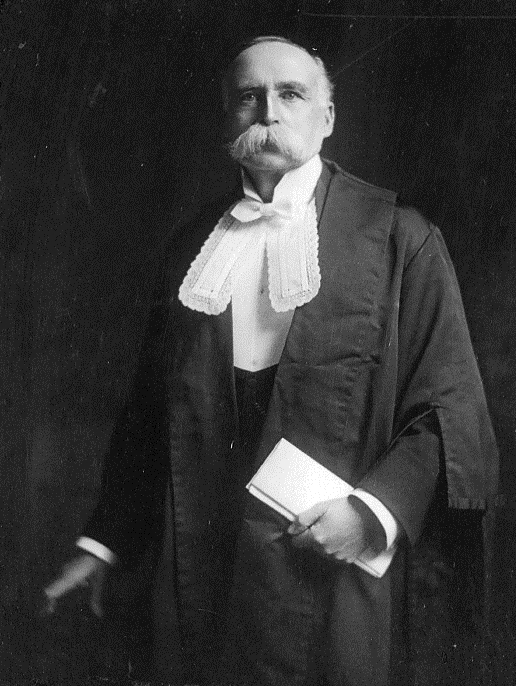
Frederic Lang

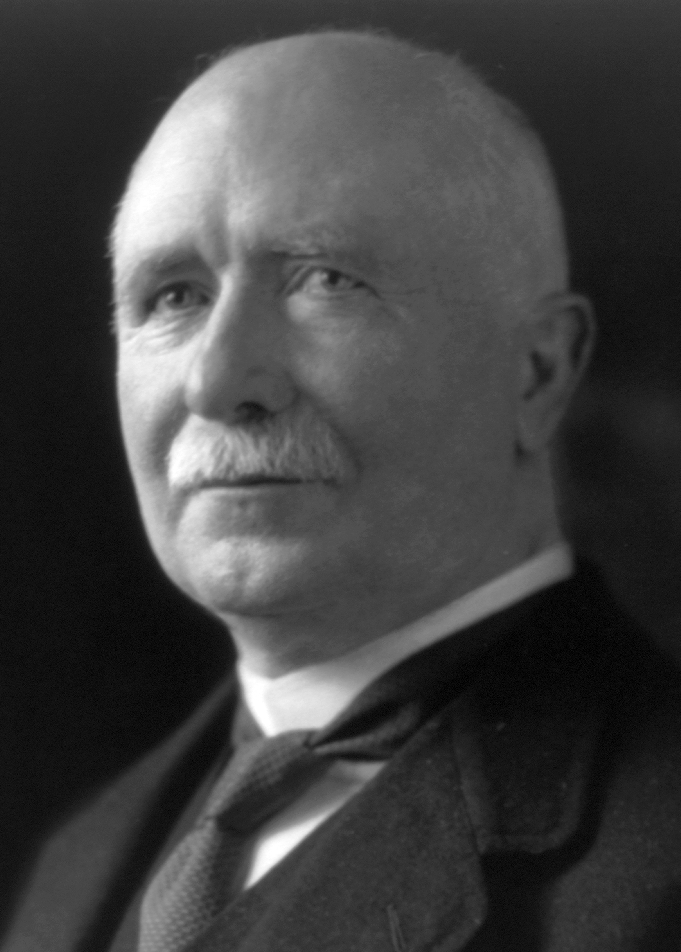
William Massey

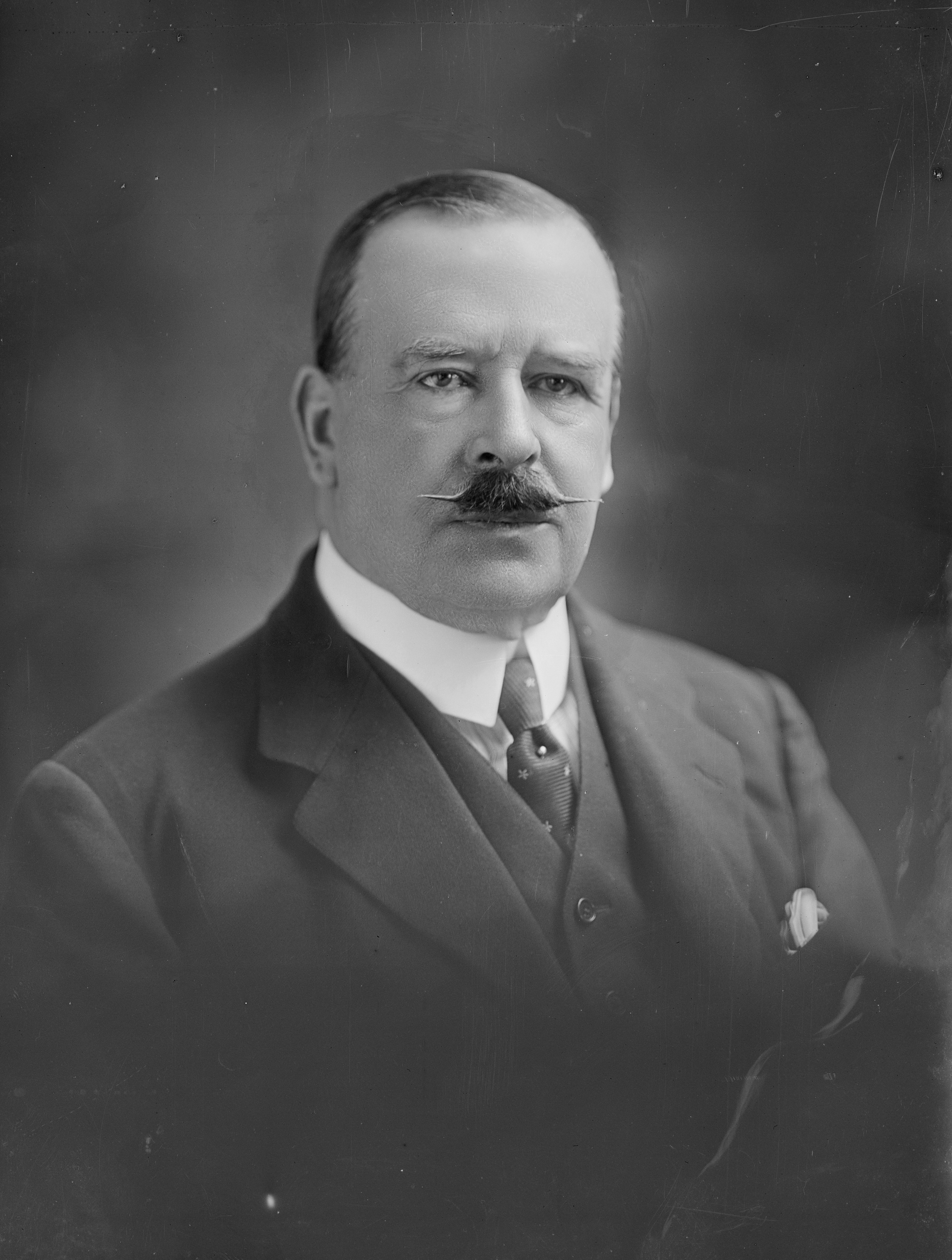
Joseph Ward

=== Parliamentary opposition ===
- Leader of the Opposition – Joseph Ward (Liberal Party). Ward retained the title even though he was part of the coalition government.
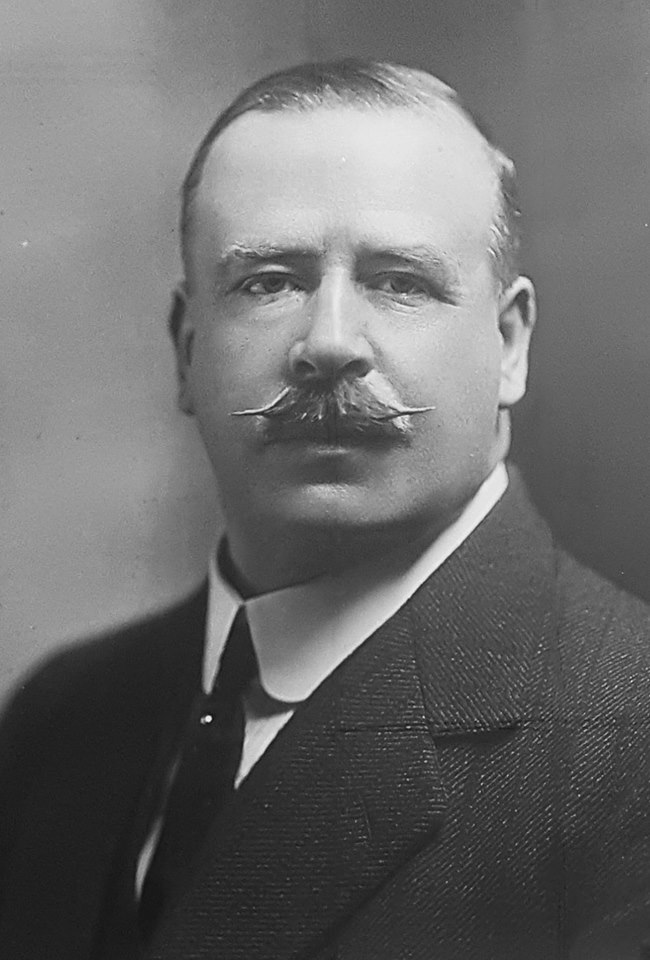
Joseph Ward

=== Judiciary ===
- Chief Justice – Sir Robert Stout
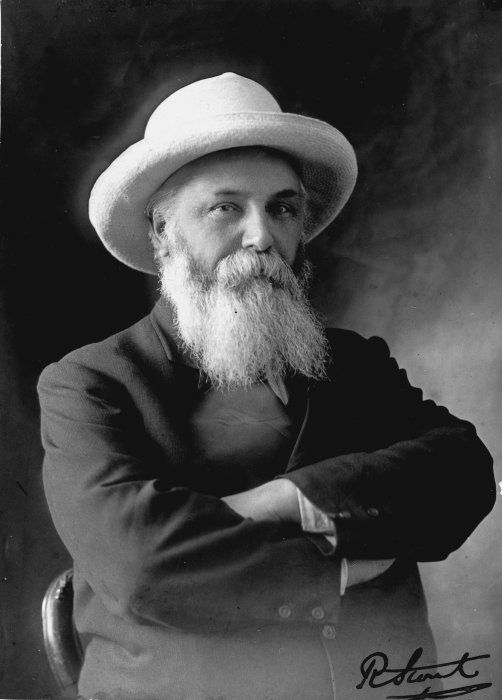
Robert Stout

=== Main centre leaders ===
- Mayor of Auckland – James Gunson
- Mayor of Wellington – John Luke
- Mayor of Christchurch – Henry Holland
- Mayor of Dunedin – James Clark
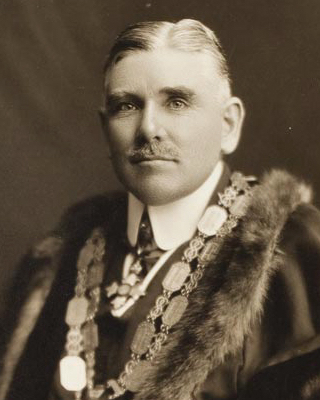
James Gunson

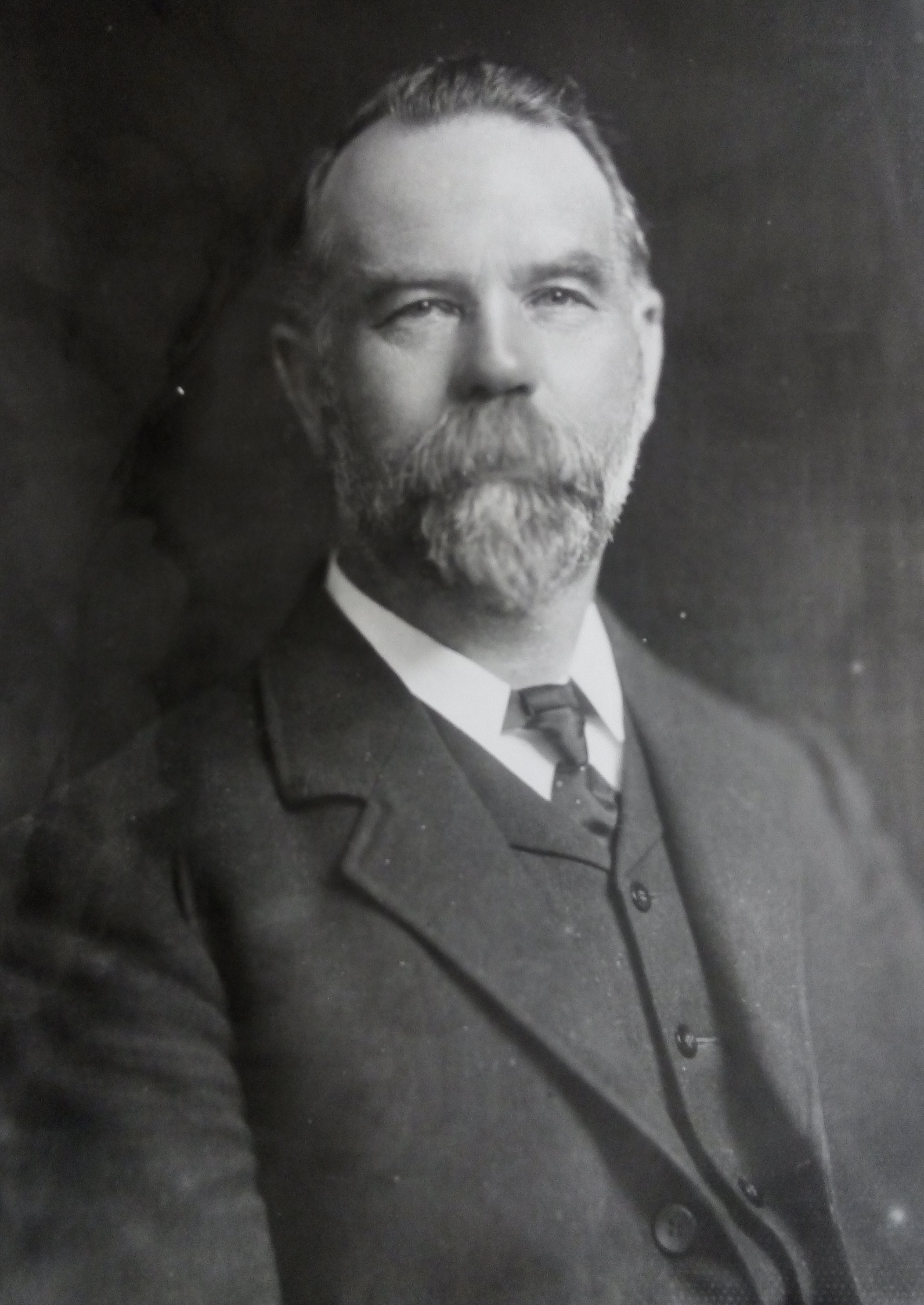
John Luke

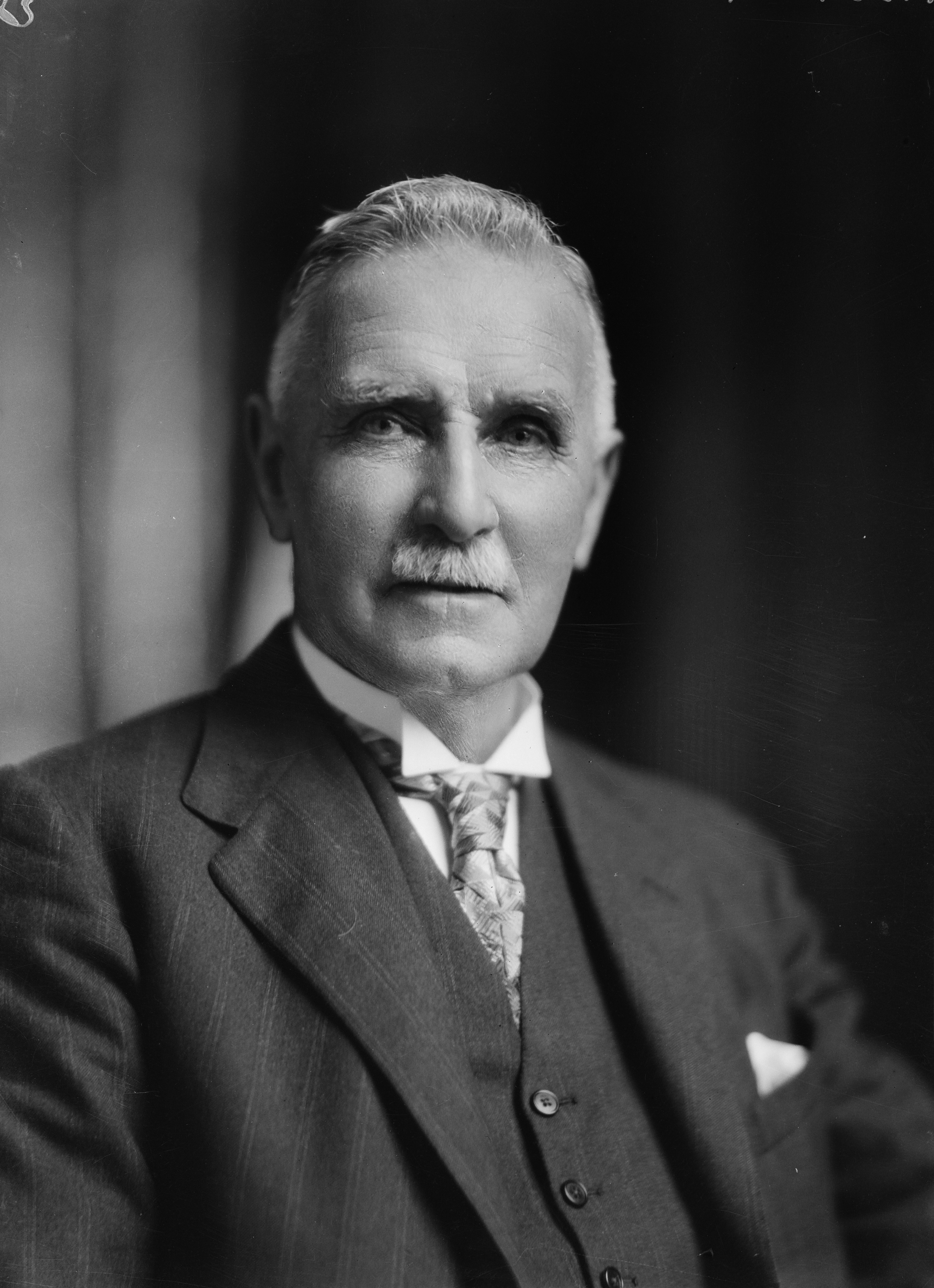
Henry Holland

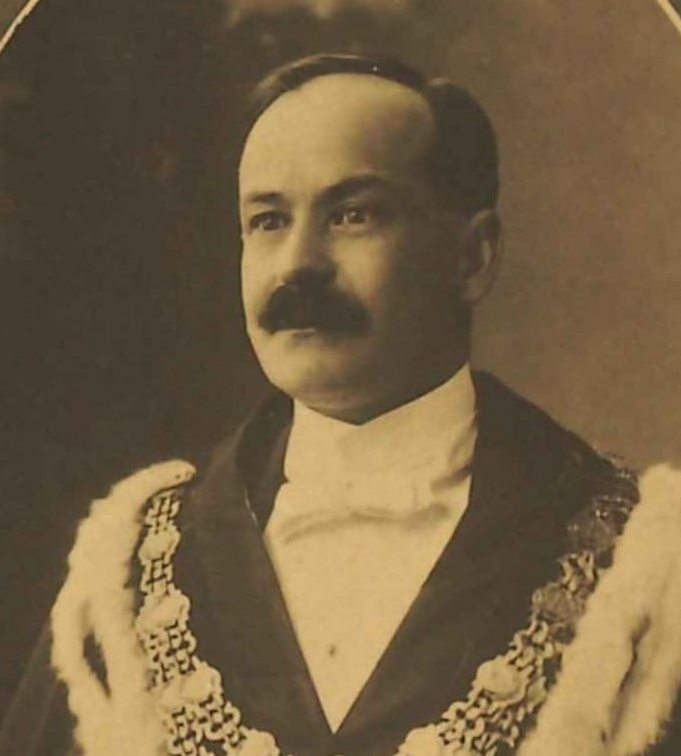
James Clark

== Events ==
- January – The New Zealand Expeditionary Force (NZEF) becomes the New Zealand Division.
- April – The New Zealand Division leaves Egypt and travels via Marseille to northern France.
- 12 May – First patrol by the New Zealand Mounted Rifles Brigade in the Sinai desert.
- 13 May – New Zealand Division moves into front-line trenches at Armentières.
- 7 July – The New Zealand Labour Party is founded in Wellington.
- 13 July – Vivian Walsh is the first New Zealander to obtain a pilot's licence while resident in New Zealand.
- 15 September – First major action by New Zealand Division in France, at Flers in the Somme. Over the following 23 days, 1560 New Zealanders are killed and 5440 wounded.
- 16 September – William Jolliffe is appointed New Zealand's first censor (on his birthday)
- 20 September – The Canterbury (NZ) Aviation Company is established in Christchurch. Henry Wigram is the main instigator. The Company's aims are to train pilots for the war, promote local aviation defence and pioneer commercial aviation.
- 15 October – The 16th New Zealand national census is taken.
- October – The Canterbury (NZ) Aviation Company purchases land at Sockburn near Christchurch. The first planes will not arrive until the following year.
- 16 November – First ballot held for reinforcements for the NZEF.

== Arts and literature ==
See 1916 in art, 1916 in literature, Category:1916 books

=== Music ===
See: 1916 in music

=== Film ===
- The Mutiny of the Bounty

See: 1916 in film, List of New Zealand feature films, Cinema of New Zealand, Category:1916 films

== Sport ==
=== Golf ===
- The New Zealand Open championship and National Amateur Championships are not held due to the war.

=== Horse racing ===
==== Harness racing ====
- New Zealand Trotting Cup – Cathedral Chimes
- Auckland Trotting Cup – Admiral Wood

==== Thoroughbred racing ====
- New Zealand Cup – Ardenvhor
- Auckland Cup – Depredation
- Wellington Cup – Bee
- New Zealand Derby – The Toff

=== Lawn bowls ===
The national outdoor lawn bowls championships are held in Christchurch.

- Men's singles champion – E.H. Fountain (Roslyn Bowling Club)
- Men's pair champions – V. Dimock, Charles Parata (skip) (Thorndon Bowling Club)
- Men's fours champions – C.W. Davis, A. E. Davis, A.B. Duff, J. Laughton (skip) (Newtown Bowling Club)

=== Rugby union ===
- The Ranfurly Shield (held by Wellington) is not contested as interprovincial matches are cancelled due to the war.

=== Soccer ===
- Provincial league champions:
  - Auckland – North Shore
  - Canterbury – Christchurch Rangers
  - Hawke's Bay – Waipukurau
  - Otago – Mornington
  - Southland – No competition
  - Wanganui – No competition
  - Wellington – No competition

== Births ==
=== January ===
- 4 January
  - Stuart Babbage, Anglican priest, civil rights advocate, writer
  - John Reid, English literature academic
- 7 January – John Brown, cyclist
- 11 January – Alan Low, economist
- 13 January – Joy Drayton, teacher, academic leader, politician
- 15 January – Ron Guthrey, soldier, politician, disabled sports advocate
- 25 January – Ernest Duncan, mathematician and professor
- 29 January – Esther Blackie, cricketer
- 31 January – Jack Finlay, rugby union player and coach, soldier

=== February ===
- 10 February – Manuhuia Bennett, Anglican bishop
- 17 February – Geoffrey Fisken, World War II fighter pilot
- 21 February – Mick Connelly, politician

=== March ===
- 6 March – Te Kari Waaka, Ringatū minister, Tūhoe leader
- 8 March – Norman Fisher, boxer
- 9 March – Ron Withell, boxer
- 19 March – Joan Donley, midwife
- 21 March – Max Brown, novelist, journalist
- 23 March – Vince McGlone, seaman, television personality

=== April ===
- 4 April – Selwyn Toogood, radio and television personality
- 12 April – Russell Garcia, composer
- 14 April – Lawrence Hogben, naval officer, meteorologist
- 17 April – Robert Menzies, cricketer
- 21 April – Harry Frazer, rugby union player
- 25 April – Keith Elliott, soldier

=== May ===
- 3 May – Keith Bracey, television personality
- 5 May – Doris Lusk, artist
- 9 May – Bob Whaitiri, Ngāi Tahu leader
- 14 May – Joan Dingley, mycologist
- 20 May – Clifford Dalton, nuclear scientist
- 24 May – Noel McMahon, cricketer

=== June ===
- 3 June – Lorelle Corbin, naval officer
- 11 June – Bob Berry, dendrologist
- 14 June – Gordon Bromley, long-distance runner

=== July ===
- 2 July – Tom Walker, soil scientist, television personality
- 9 July – Dean Goffin, composer
- 16 July – Bill Carson, cricketer, rugby union player, soldier
- 17 July – Sid Scales, cartoonist
- 18 July – Owen Woodhouse, jurist
- 20 July – Bill Gilbert, soldier, intelligence service director
- 21 July – Roy Taylor, cyclist
- 31 July – Verdun Scott, cricketer

=== August ===
- 1 August
  - Dorothy Daniels, ballet teacher and director
  - Sybil Lupp, mechanic, motor-racing driver
- 6 August – Tom Clark, industrialist, yachting patron
- 15 August – Derek Freeman, anthropologist
- 22 August – Rona McCarthy, athlete
- 30 August – Tex Morton, country music entertainer

=== September ===
- 1 September – Allan McCready, politician
- 9 September
  - Charles Fleming, scientist
  - Jack Scott, politician
- 14 September – Edward Norman, soldier, Anglican bishop

=== October ===
- 10 October – Gordon Cochrane, military and civil pilot
- 15 October – Leonard Thornton, military leader
- 25 October – Bruce Campbell, lawyer, politician, jurist
- 26 October – Ernest Bezzant, cricketer
- 28 October – Frank Kerr, cricketer
- 30 October – Peter King, army officer

=== November ===
- 4 November – Allan Pyatt, Anglican bishop
- 11 November – Ramai Hayward, photographer, actor, cinematographer
- 16 November
  - Harold Baigent, actor, theatre director
  - Herb Green, obstetrician and gynaecologist
- 17 November
  - Paraone Reweti, politician
  - George Silk, photojournalist
- 21 November – Margaret Dalziel, English literature academic

=== December ===
- 1 December – Alan Boxer, Royal Air Force officer
- 12 December – Jack Davies, swimmer
- 13 December – Ossie Cleal, association footballer, cricketer
- 15 December – Maurice Wilkins, physicist and molecular biologist
- 18 December – Noel Crump, swimmer
- 19 December – Merv Wallace, cricketer
- 26 December – Jean Sandel, surgeon
- 27 December
  - Betty Forbes, high jumper
  - Frank Hofmann, photographer, musician
- 28 December – Frederick Turnovsky, manufacturer, arts advocate

=== Exact date unknown ===
- Garth Chester, furniture designer

== Deaths ==
=== January–March ===
- 16 January – Hēnare Kōhere, rugby union player, soldier (born 1880)
- 22 January – Lucy Mansel, community worker (born c.1831)
- 9 March – Edward Moss, politician (born 1856)
- 16 March – Thomas King, astronomer (born 1858)

=== April–June ===
- 4 April – John McIndoe, printer (born 1858)
- 7 April – Horace Martineau, soldier (born 1874)
- 9 May – William Graham, surveyor, farming leader, politician (born 1841)
- 20 May – Fanny Howie, singer and composer (born 1868)
- 22 May – Kimball Bent, soldier, adventurer (born 1837)
- 23 May – Charlie Douglas, explorer, surveyor (born 1840)
- 21 June – William Mowbray, teacher, musician (born 1835)
- 8 June – Henry Wilding, social reformer (born 1844)
- 16 June – William Barron, politician (born 1837)

=== July–September ===
- 4 July – Ann Evans, nurse, midwife (born c.1840)
- 11 July – Graham Cook, rugby league player (born 1893)
- 25 July – Thomas Cooke, soldier (born 1881)
- 27 July – Arthur Brown, politician (born 1856)
- 28 July – James Escott, politician (born 1872)
- 30 July – Eveline Cunnington, social reformer, feminist (born 1849)
- 31 July – John Stevens, politician (born 1845)
- 24 August – Leonard Williams, Māori language scholar, Anglican bishop (born 1829)
- 25 August
  - Martin Kennedy, mine owner, politician (born c.1839)
  - Sir Maurice O'Rorke, politician (born 1830)
- 16 September – Rupert Hickmott, cricketer (born 1894)
- 17 September – Arthur Martin, surgeon (born 1876)
- 19 September – Frank Wilson, rugby union player (born 1885)
- 21 September – Bobby Black, rugby union player (born 1893)
- 25 September – Stuart Menteath, politician (born 1853)
- 29 September – Josiah Martin, educationalist, photographer (born 1843)

=== October–December ===
- 1 October – Donald Brown, soldier (born 1890)
- 12 October – David Gage, rugby union player (born 1868)
- 14 October – Jack Carey, trade unionist (born 1876)
- 18 October – Samuel Andrews, politician (born 1836)
- 19 October – Catherine Francis, teacher (born 1836)
- 29 October – John Braithwaite, soldier (born 1885)
- 11 November – Frank Isitt, Methodist minister, temperance campaigner (born 1843)
- 12 November – Frances Stewart, women's and children's rights activist (born 1840)
- 16 December – Coupland Harding, printer, typographer, journalist (born 1849)

== See also ==
- History of New Zealand
- List of years in New Zealand
- Military history of New Zealand
- Timeline of New Zealand history
- Timeline of New Zealand's links with Antarctica
- Timeline of the New Zealand environment
