= Thorndon, New Zealand =

Suburb of Wellington City, New Zealand

Thorndon
- Suburb
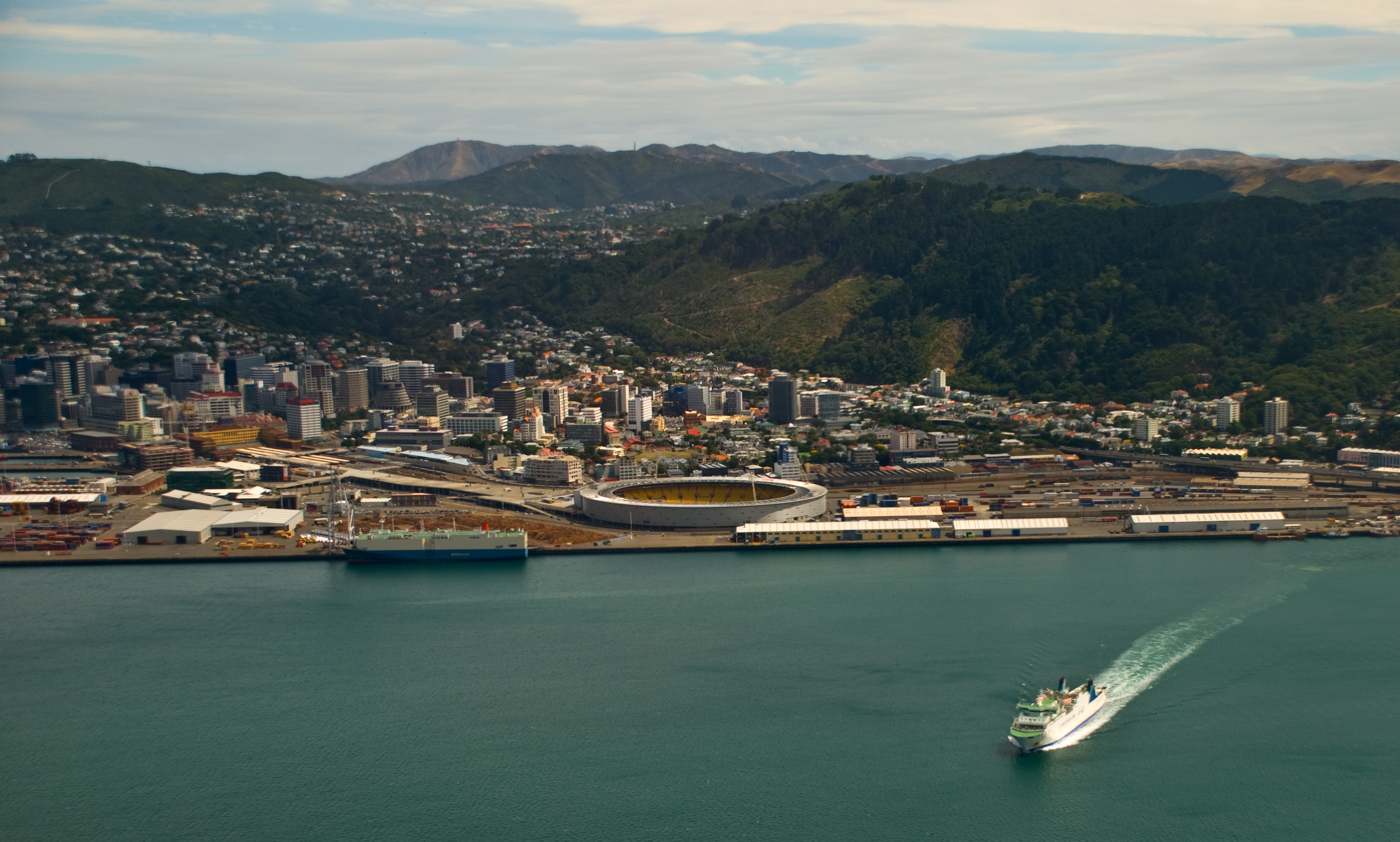
- Thorndon in front of Kelburn and Te Ahumairangi Hill. Karori in the distance
- Interactive map of Thorndon
- Coordinates: 41°16′30″S 174°46′40″E
- Country: New Zealand
- City: Wellington City
- Local authority: Wellington City Council
- Electoral ward: Pukehīnau/Lambton Ward; Te Whanganui-a-Tara Māori Ward
- Established: 1840

Area
  - Land: 149 ha (370 acres)

Population (June 2025)
  - Total: 4,070
  - Density: 2,730/km^{2} (7,070/sq mi)
- Railway stations: Wellington railway station; opened 1937; Pipitea Point station (burnt 1878); Thorndon station (dem. 1937); Lambton station (dem. 1937)
- Ferry terminals: Wellington Interislander Terminal, Wellington Bluebridge Terminal

Wilton	Wadestown
Northland	Thorndon	Pipitea
	Kelburn, Pipitea Central Business District

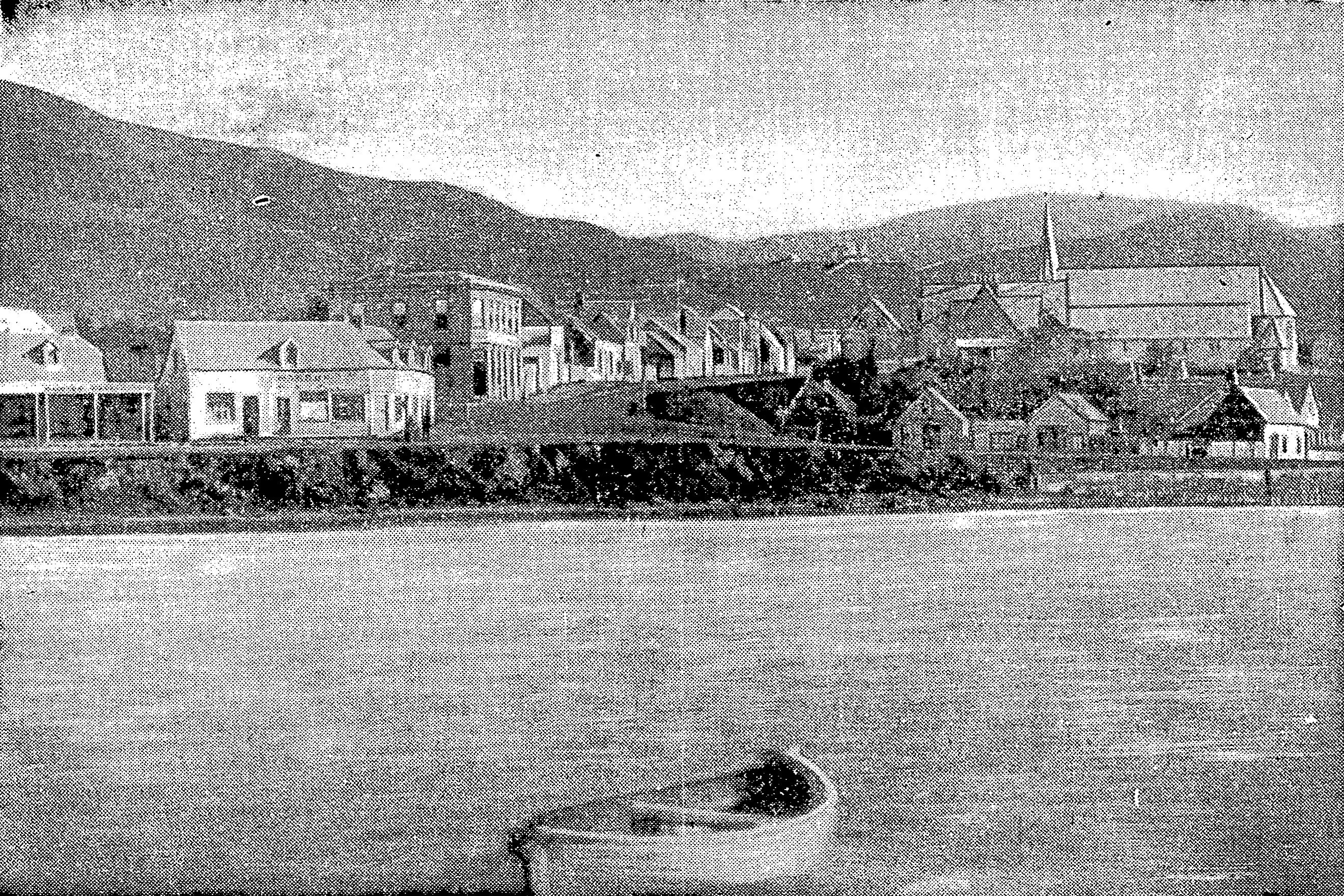
Thorndon Quay — Mulgrave Street. Pipitea Pā in the right foreground, St Paul's pro-cathedral behind the pā. Thistle Inn is slightly left of the centre of this 1866 picture

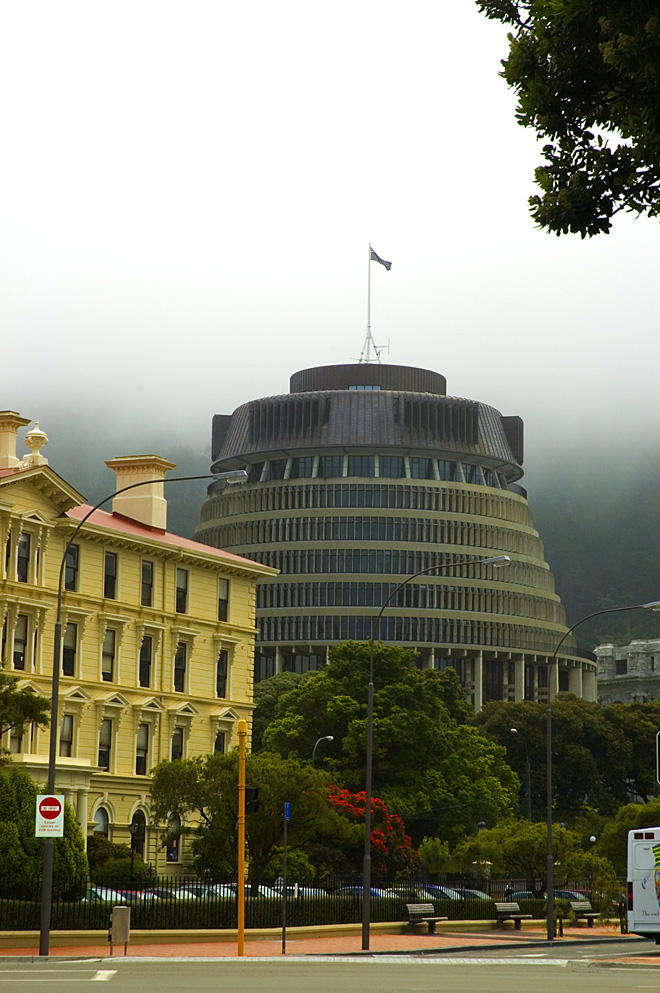
Parliament's Beehive and the old wooden administration building on reclaimed land

Thorndon is a historic inner suburb of Wellington, the capital city of New Zealand. Because the suburb is relatively level compared to the hilly terrain elsewhere in Wellington it contained Wellington's elite residential area until it changed in the 1960s with the building of a new motorway and the erection of tall office buildings on the sites of its Molesworth Street retail and service businesses.

Before Thorndon was Thorndon it was Haukawakawa and in 1824 Pipitea Pā was settled at its southern end. More recently Pipitea Marae and the land under the Government Centre have been separated from Thorndon and the name Pipitea returned in 2003. The reclamations have been included in the new suburb Pipitea.

Thorndon combines the home of government and residential accommodation. It is located at the northern end of the Central Business District.

== History ==
Pipitea has been said to have been named for the pipi beds along Thorndon Quay.

Ngāti Mutunga from Taranaki established the fortified village, Pipitea Pā, in 1824 on the Haukawakawa flats. Then the Ngāti Mutunga left on the sailing ship Rodney in 1835 settling in the Chatham Islands and Te Āti Awa occupied the pā. The pā declined after European settlement though some people remained there into the 20th century. There were other villages near 191 Thorndon Quay and near the junction of Hobson Street with Fitzherbert Terrace. The Pā's gardens reached parliament grounds and the Botanic Garden. A mural Kaiota was painted in 2023 on Bowen Street referencing Māori cultivations of the area of the homesteads Pakuo Pā and Raurimu Kainga.

Part of the previous pā site opened in 1980 as an urban marae, Pipitea Pā built by Ngāti Pōneke, it is now located in the suburb Pipitea that was created in 2003.

Thorndon, like Te Aro, is one of the few comparatively flat areas on the harbour. Haukawakawa / Thorndon flats became a significant part of Port Nicholson's first organised European settlement in 1840. S C Brees described it in 1848 as "the court end of town". (Note: "being the neighbourhood of Government House, the church, the law courts, police court . . . etc" Samuel Charles Brees. Pictorial Illustrations of New Zealand, London, J. Williams, 1848) European settlers built their houses alongside the Māori settlement of Pipitea and the New Zealand Company named all the flats Thorndon after the estate of W H F Petre one of their directors.

== Demographics ==
Thorndon, comprising the statistical areas of Thorndon North and Thorndon South, covers 1.49 km^{2} (0.58 sq mi). It had an estimated population of 4,070 as of June 2025, with a population density of 2,732 people per km^{2}.

Historical population
Year	Pop.	±% p.a.
2006	3,477	—
2013	3,687	+0.84%
2018	4,020	+1.74%
2023	3,909	−0.56%

Thorndon had a population of 3,909 in the 2023 New Zealand census, a decrease of 111 people (−2.8%) since the 2018 census, and an increase of 222 people (6.0%) since the 2013 census. There were 1,818 males, 2,040 females, and 54 people of other genders in 1,929 dwellings. 13.1% of people identified as LGBTIQ+. The median age was 33.9 years (compared with 38.1 years nationally). There were 285 people (7.3%) aged under 15 years, 1,287 (32.9%) aged 15 to 29, 1,860 (47.6%) aged 30 to 64, and 480 (12.3%) aged 65 or older.

People could identify as more than one ethnicity. The results were 76.1% European (Pākehā); 8.4% Māori; 4.1% Pasifika; 19.4% Asian; 2.8% Middle Eastern, Latin American and African New Zealanders (MELAA); and 2.1% other, which includes people giving their ethnicity as "New Zealander". English was spoken by 97.9%, Māori by 2.9%, Samoan by 0.9%, and other languages by 24.3%. No language could be spoken by 0.8% (e.g. too young to talk). New Zealand Sign Language was known by 0.6%. The percentage of people born overseas was 37.1, compared with 28.8% nationally.

Religious affiliations were 25.1% Christian, 2.5% Hindu, 1.1% Islam, 0.3% Māori religious beliefs, 1.7% Buddhist, 0.5% New Age, 0.4% Jewish, and 2.1% other religions. People who answered that they had no religion were 61.4%, and 5.2% of people did not answer the census question.

Of those at least 15 years old, 2,223 (61.3%) people had a bachelor's or higher degree, 1,089 (30.0%) had a post-high school certificate or diploma, and 309 (8.5%) people exclusively held high school qualifications. The median income was $65,900, compared with $41,500 nationally. 987 people (27.2%) earned over $100,000 compared to 12.1% nationally. The employment status of those at least 15 was 2,460 (67.9%) full-time, 399 (11.0%) part-time, and 81 (2.2%) unemployed.

Individual statistical areas
Name	Area (km^{2})	Population	Density (per km^{2})	Dwellings	Median age	Median income
Thorndon North	1.02	2,211	2,168	1,059	33.6 years	$64,400
Thorndon South	0.46	1,701	3,698	870	34.2 years	$68,000
New Zealand					38.1 years	$41,500

== Notable buildings ==
The buildings of the New Zealand Parliament are located in Thorndon. Thorndon is also the location of national institutions including the Appeal and High Courts —the Supreme Court is on Lambton Quay facing Parliament— the National Library and Archives New Zealand.

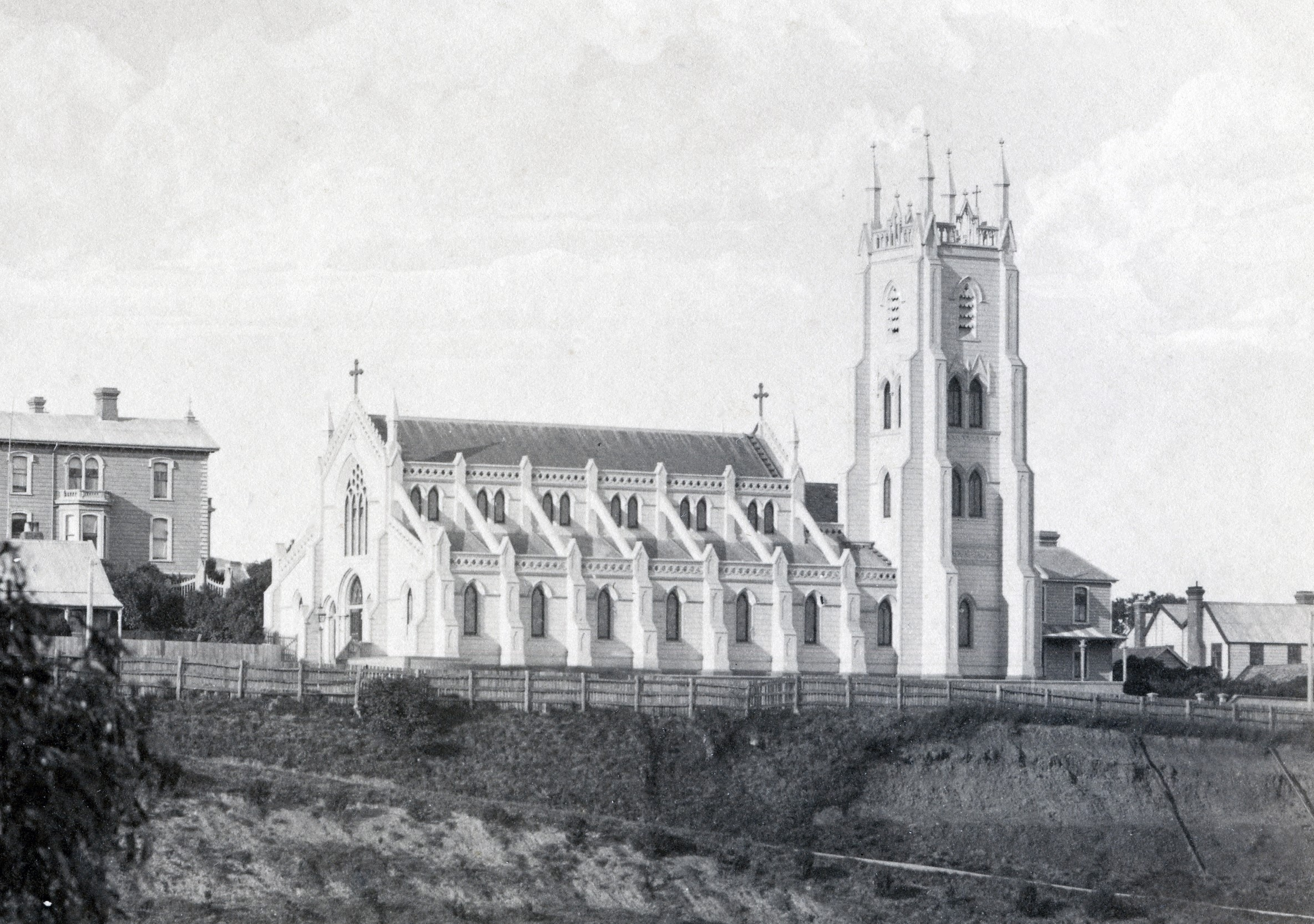
St Mary's Cathedral, 1890

The national museum moved from behind Parliament in Museum Street to a much larger purpose-built building in Buckle Street just before the second world war then in 1998 to the harbour edge and is now Te Papa Tongarewa.

Thorndon is home to two Cathedrals: the Anglican St Paul's Cathedral built between 1937 and 1998 to replace the pro-cathedral now known as Old St Paul's, which in turn had replaced a church on the site of the Beehive in 1844; and the Roman Catholic Sacred Heart Cathedral in Hill Street, opened in 1901 to replace the destroyed St Mary's Cathedral in Eccleston Hill dating from 1851.

The Thistle Inn is one of New Zealand's oldest pubs.

== Geographic boundaries ==
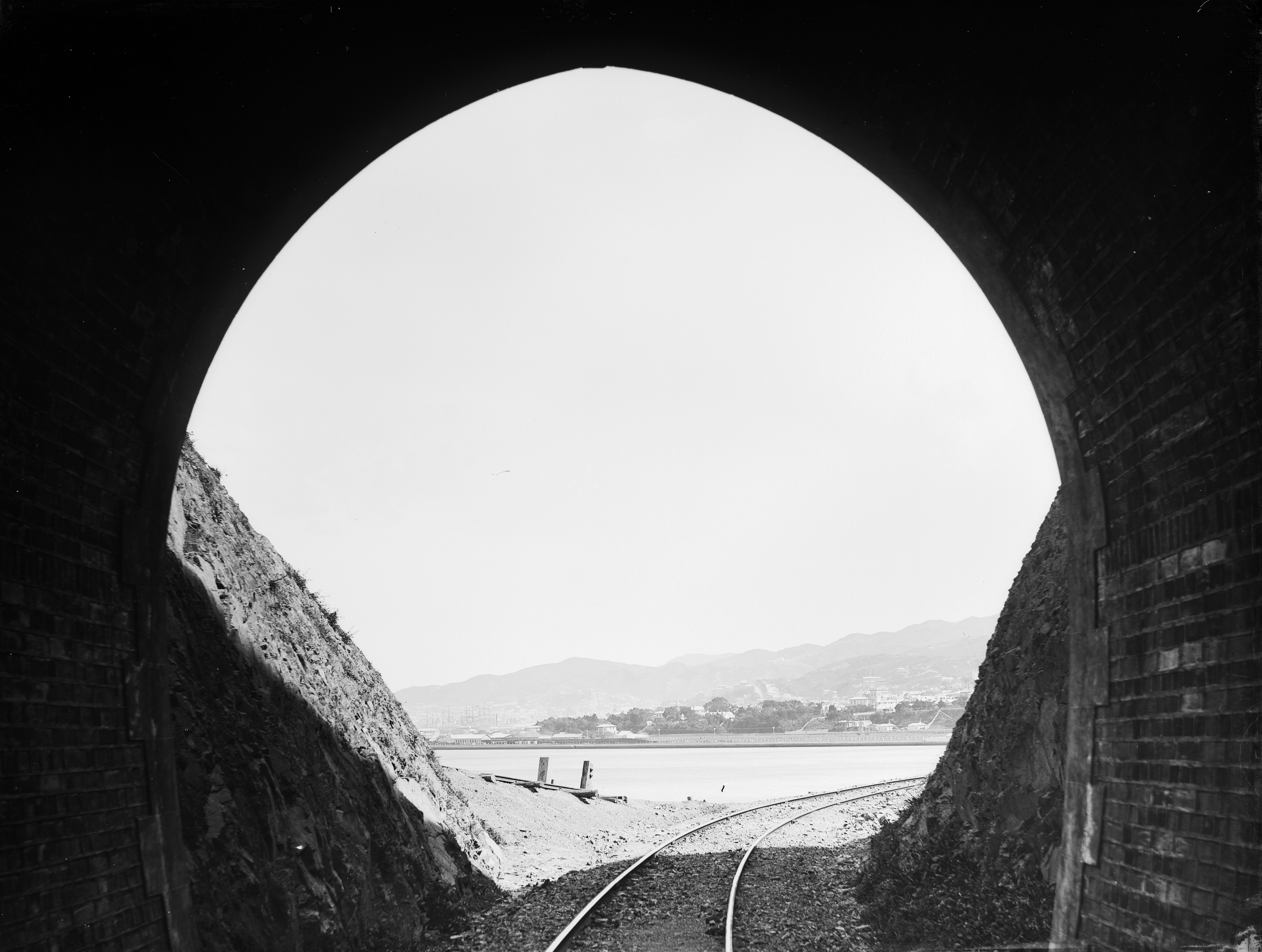
Thorndon 1880s from a Kaiwarra tunnel

Thorndon occupies the northern end of the narrow coastal plain that makes up the heart of Wellington. It is flanked to the north by the green hills of Wadestown, by Northland and Kelburn to the west and south, and on its south Pipitea with the Government Centre, the marae and to its east the port facilities of Wellington Harbour. Thorndon now incorporates Te Ahumairangi Hill.

The boundaries of Thorndon form a very rough triangle. Starting from the triangle's lower south-west corner, at the intersection of Glenmore Street and Collins Terrace, the boundary goes up through the north side of Te Ahumairangi Hill right across to Wadestown's Weld Street and down to the north end of Frandi Street. Then the boundary follows the west side of Thorndon Quay down until Davis Street where it zig-zags through to Hill Street then over to Bowen Street, Tinakori Road and Glenmore Street up to its junction with Collins Terrace.

== Parks and gardens ==
Queen's Park was created to commemorate Queen Victoria's Diamond Jubilee in 1897. It is bounded by Grant Road, Wadestown Road and Park Road with a fountain at the intersection of Grant Road and Wadestown Road. Trees in the park are a mixture of natives and exotics including a stand of oak trees. The Magyar Millennium Park, commonly known as the Hungarian garden, is on the corner of Molesworth Street and Hawkestone Street. It was built in 2003, although it was planned to be opened in 2000 to mark the millennium of Hungary being a Christian state. It is the only Hungarian monument in New Zealand. It incorporates a paved area, seating, planted garden beds, a carved gate and memorial plaques. The Katherine Mansfield Memorial Park in Fitzherbert Terrace is dedicated to the writer Katherine Mansfield. It was created in the late 1960s when the urban motorway was built and incorporates the Lady McKenzie Garden for the Blind. The Wellington Botanic Garden is situated between the suburbs of Thorndon and Kelburn.

=== Gallery ===
Thorndon parks and gardens

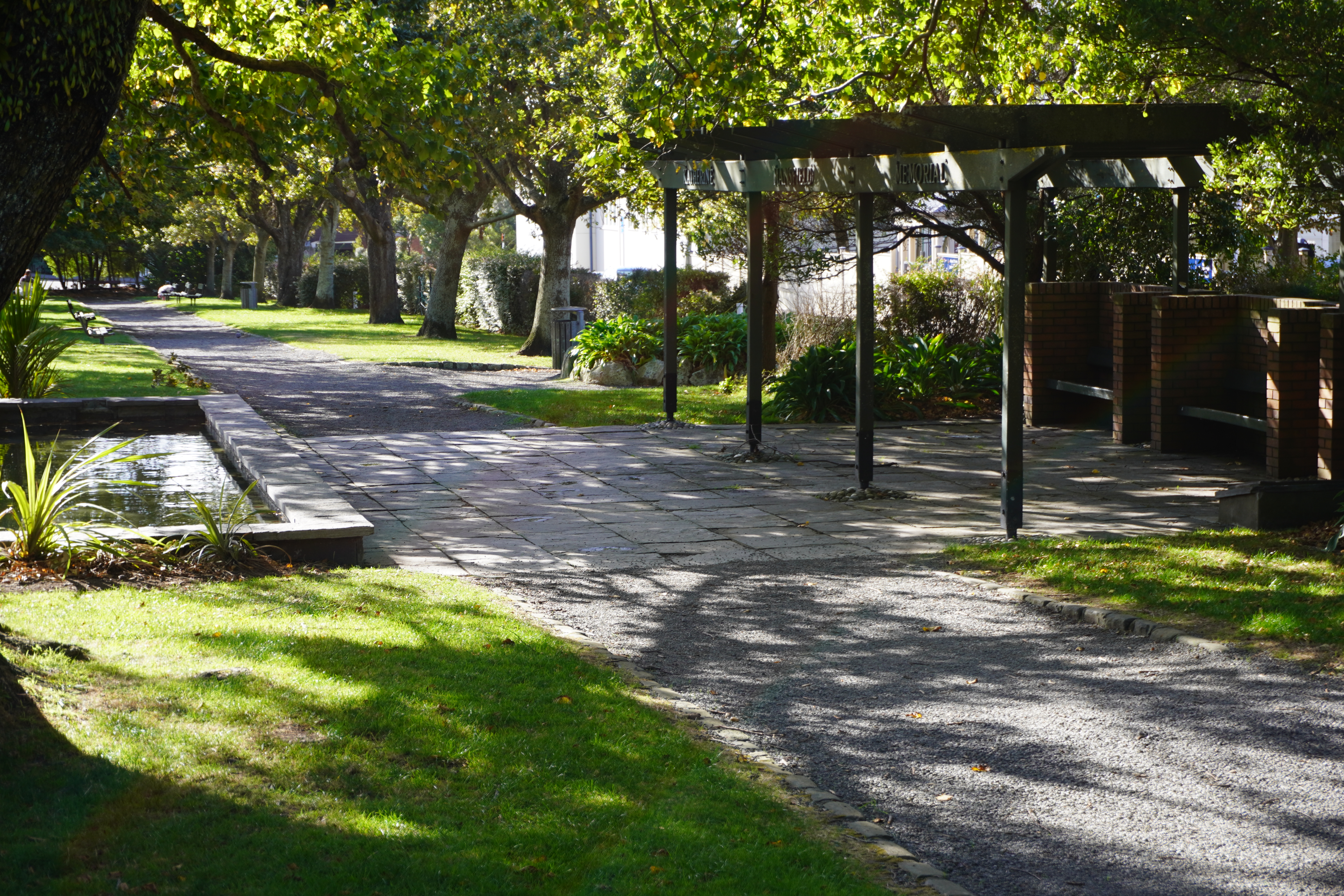
Katherine Mansfield Memorial Park, 2021

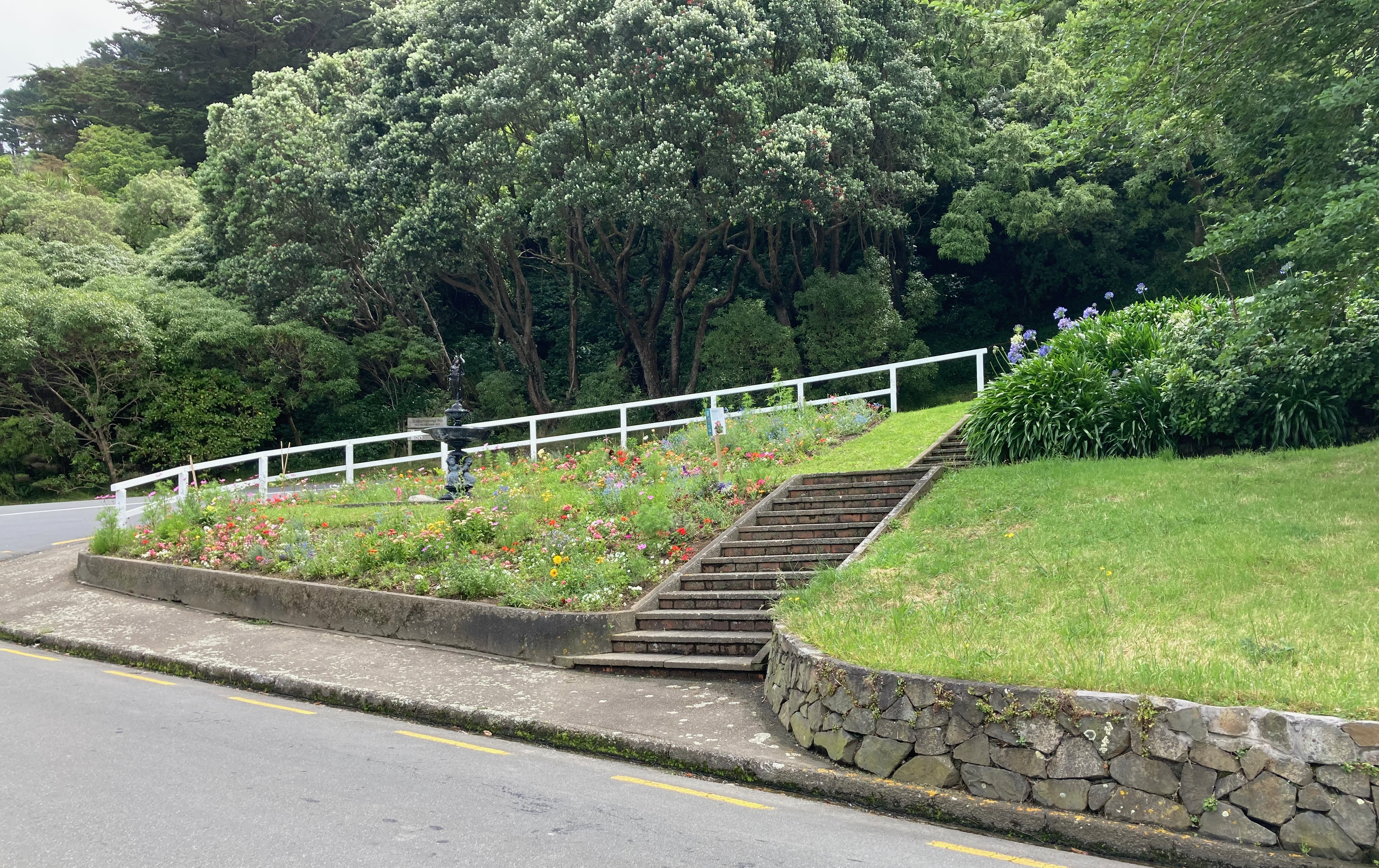
Queen's Park fountain and garden, 2021

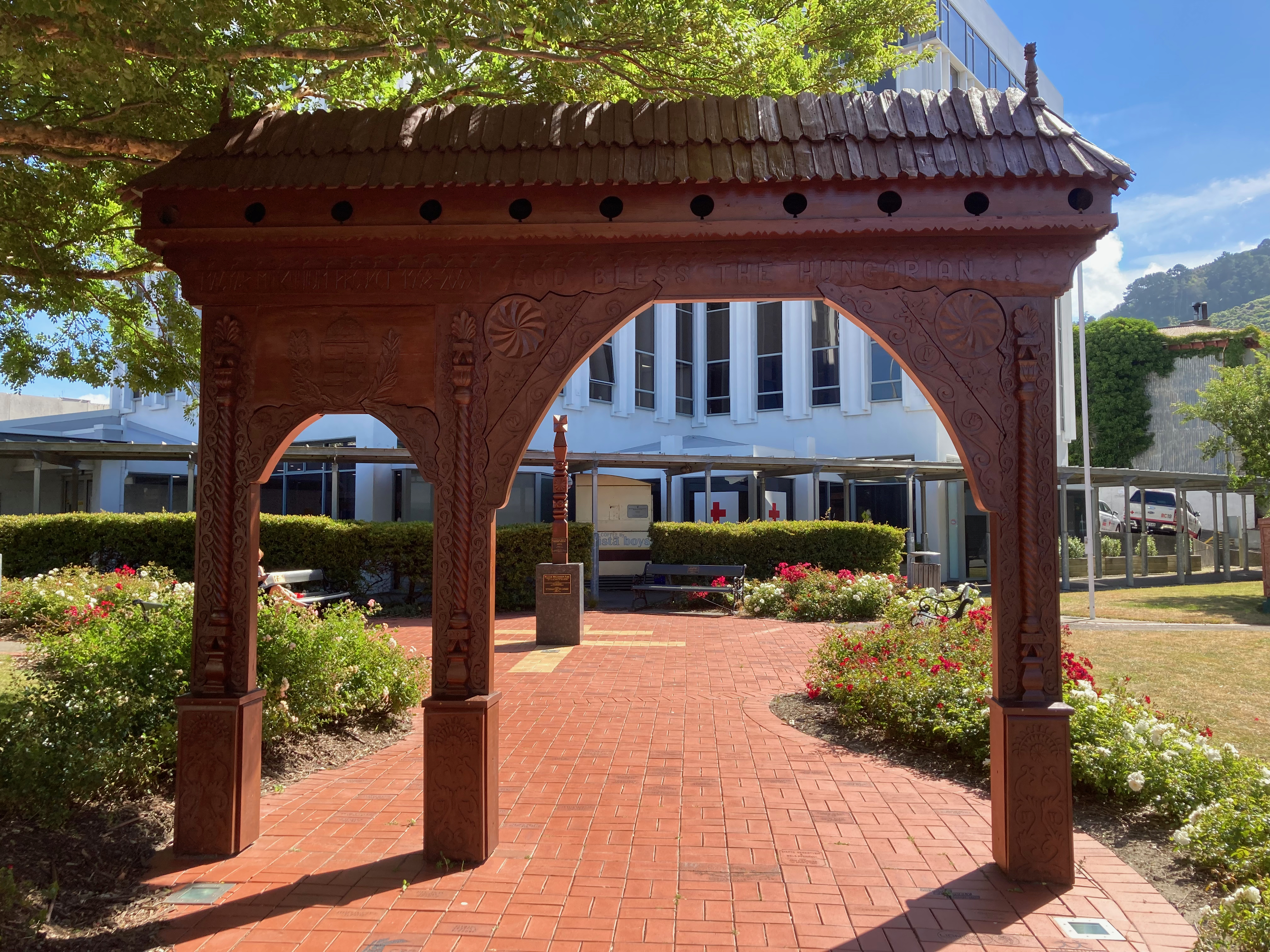
Magyar Millennium Park carved gate, 2022

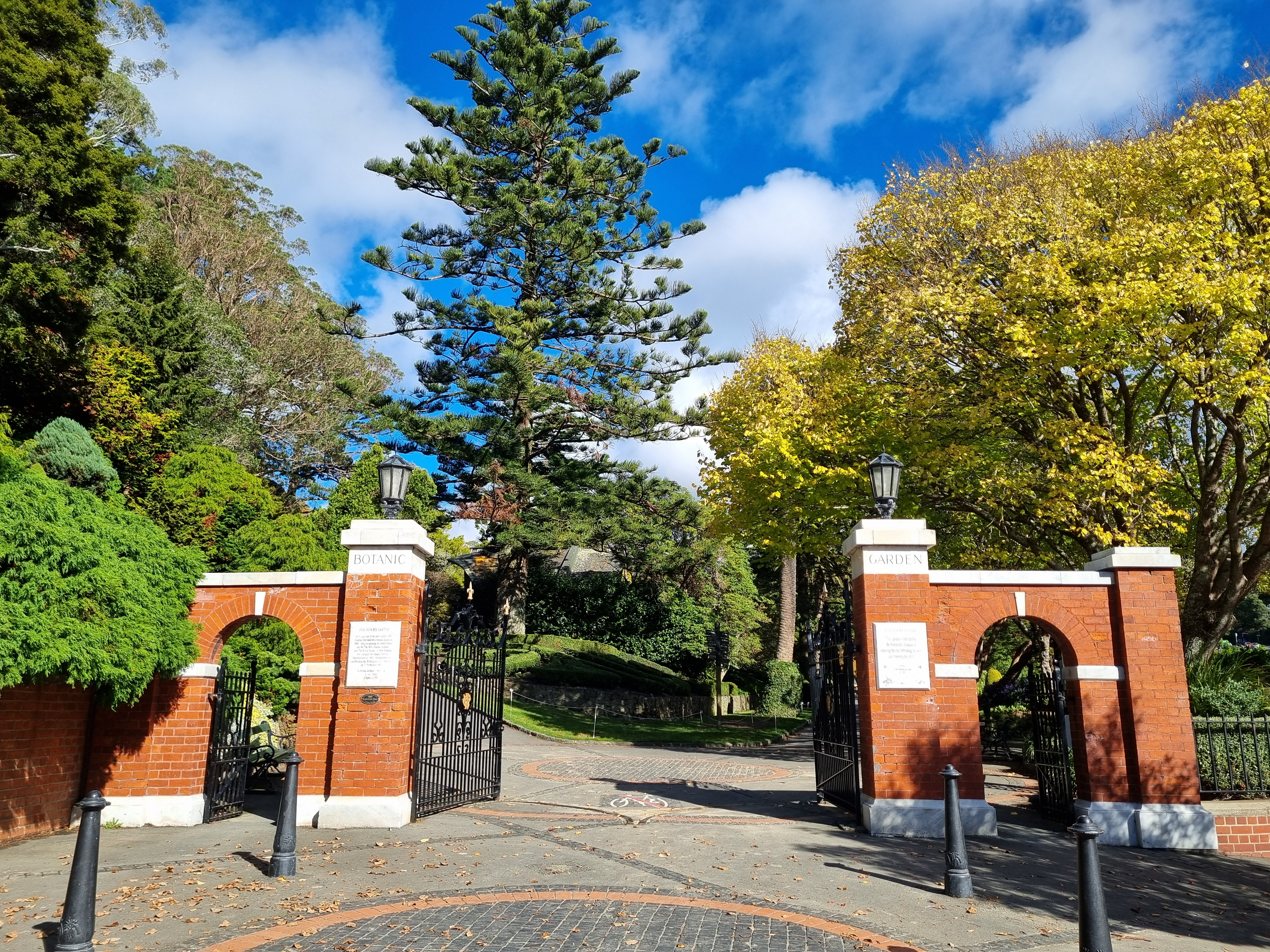
Founders Entrance, Botanic Gardens, 2024

== Education ==
Wellington Girls' College is a state single-sex secondary school for years 9 to 13. It had a roll of 1,425 as of July 2026. It opened as Wellington Girls' High School in 1883 on Abel Smith Street, and moved to its current location on Pipitea Street in 1887.

St Mary's College is a state-integrated Catholic girls' secondary school for years 9 to 13. It had a roll of 558 as of July 2026. It opened in 1850.

Queen Margaret College is a private girls' composite school for years 1 to 13. It had a roll of 761 as of July 2026. It was opened in 1919 by Scottish Presbyterians in a building previously used by Scots College.

Thorndon School is a state full primary school for years 1 to 8. It had a roll of 278 as of July 2026. It first opened in 1852 as St Paul's School, a church school, and became a state school in 1873. It moved to its current site in 1880.

Sacred Heart Cathedral School is a state-integrated Catholic full primary school for years 1 to 8. It had a roll of 232 as of July 2026. It opened in 1852 as St Mary's Day School, and changed its name to Sacred Heart School in 1900.

== Events ==
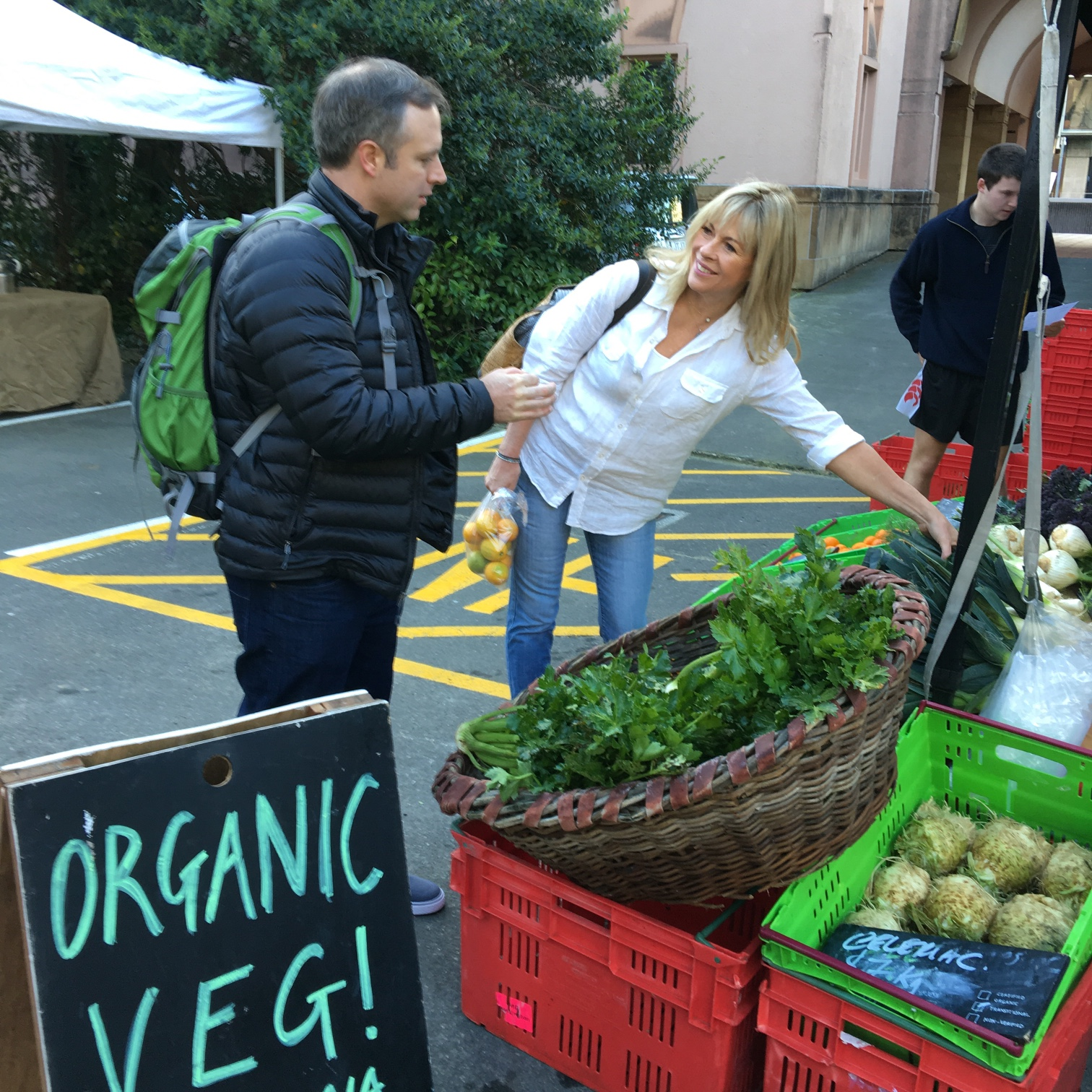
Farmers' market in the St Paul's Cathedral car park, Hill St

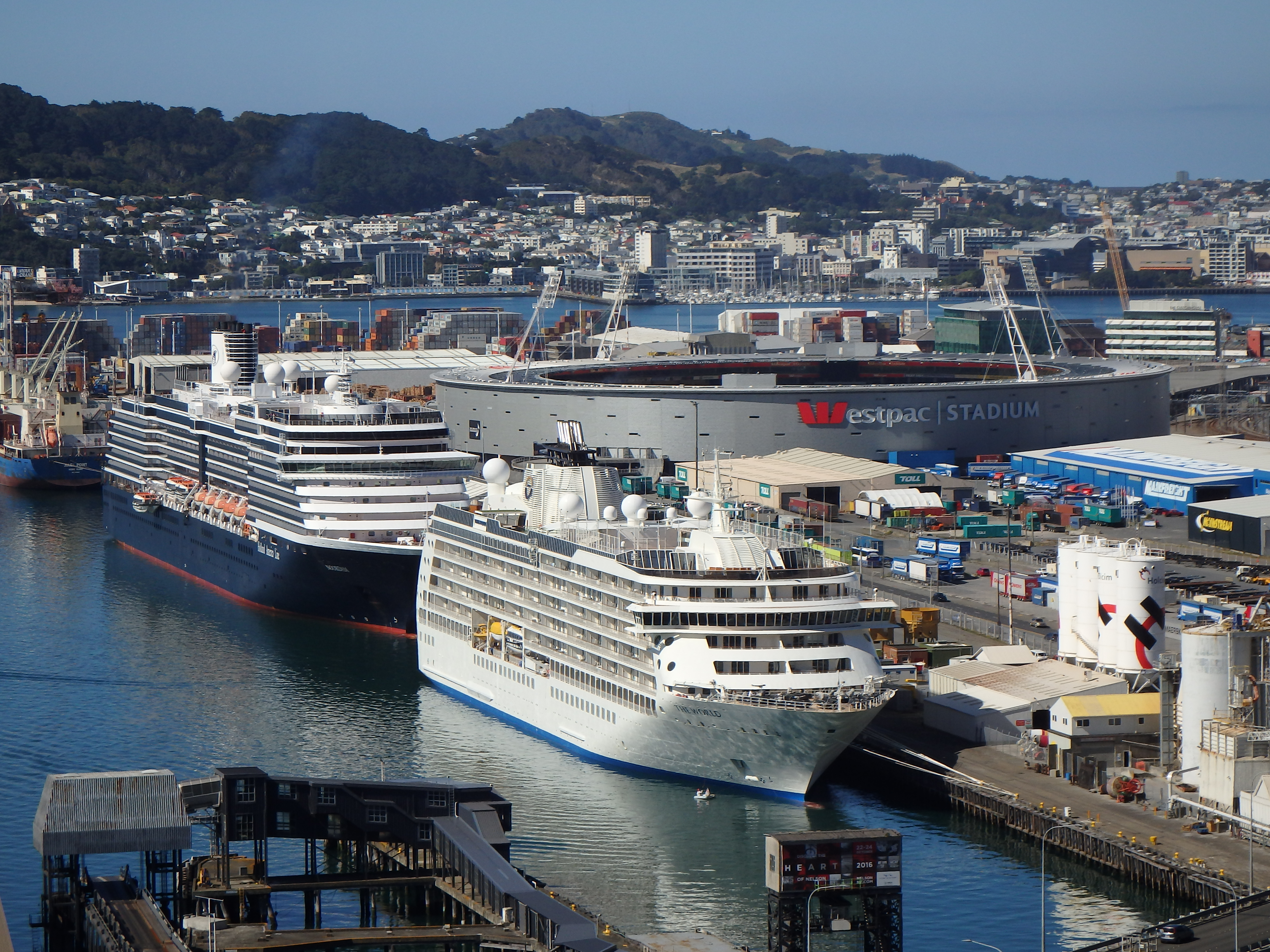
Cruise ships Noordam and The World by the Stadium

Thorndon Farmers Market is set up each Saturday in Hill Street.

The Thorndon Fair has been almost every year since 1977, usually on the first Sunday of December. The fair has many stalls selling crafts and second-hand goods and is held for the benefit of Thorndon School. It is one of the main community events held in Thorndon. Parts of Tinakori Road and Hill Street are closed during the fair.

Wellington Regional Stadium is in Thorndon and hosts sporting events and concerts. The Thorndon Tennis (and Squash) Club was established in 1879.

== Notable residents ==
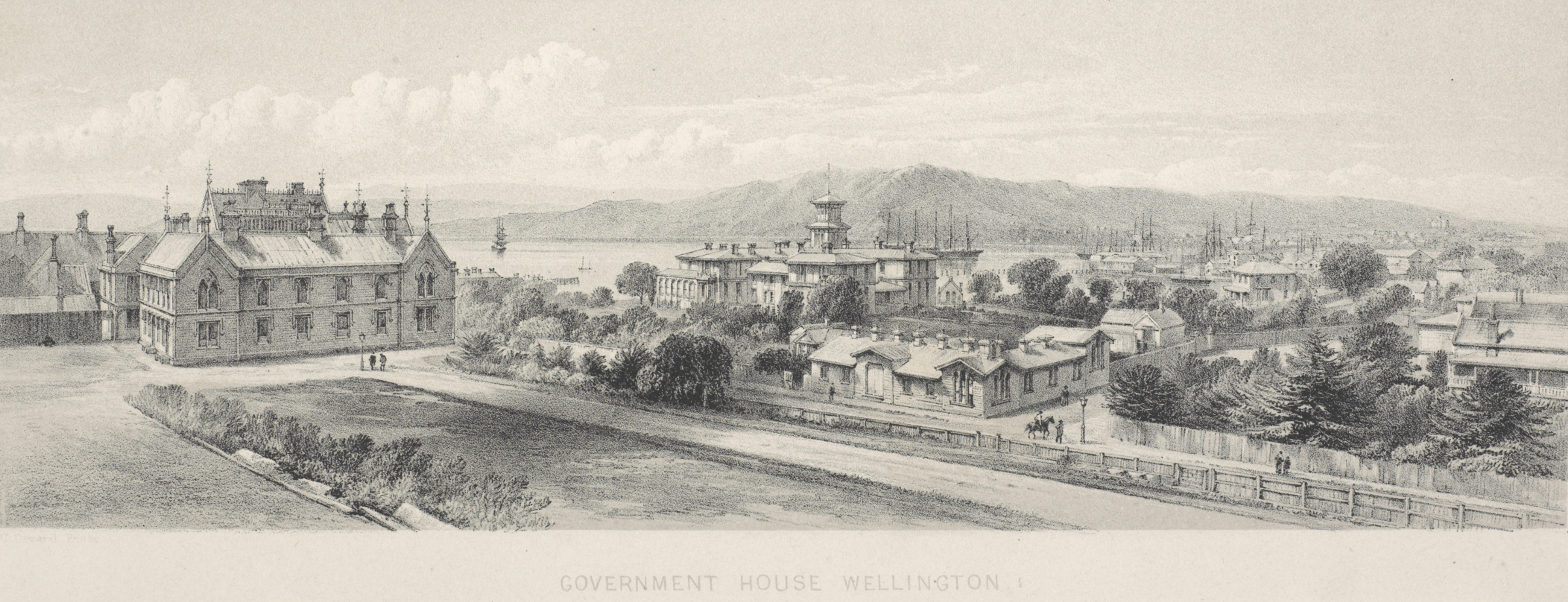
Old Government House Thorndon circa 1877 on the site of the Beehive. Old Parliament Buildings at the left on the site of the Parliamentary Library

=== Ex officio ===
- Governor-General at Bowen Street from 1871 to 1907 (Note: when Government House was taken over by Parliament following the destruction of Parliament Buildings by fire, (that building was eventually demolished to erect the Beehive) and a new residence built by the Basin Reserve) on what is now the site of the Beehive
- Prime Minister at 260 Tinakori Road
- Speaker
- Anglican Bishop of Wellington
- Catholic Archbishop of Wellington and Metropolitan of New Zealand

=== Private citizens ===
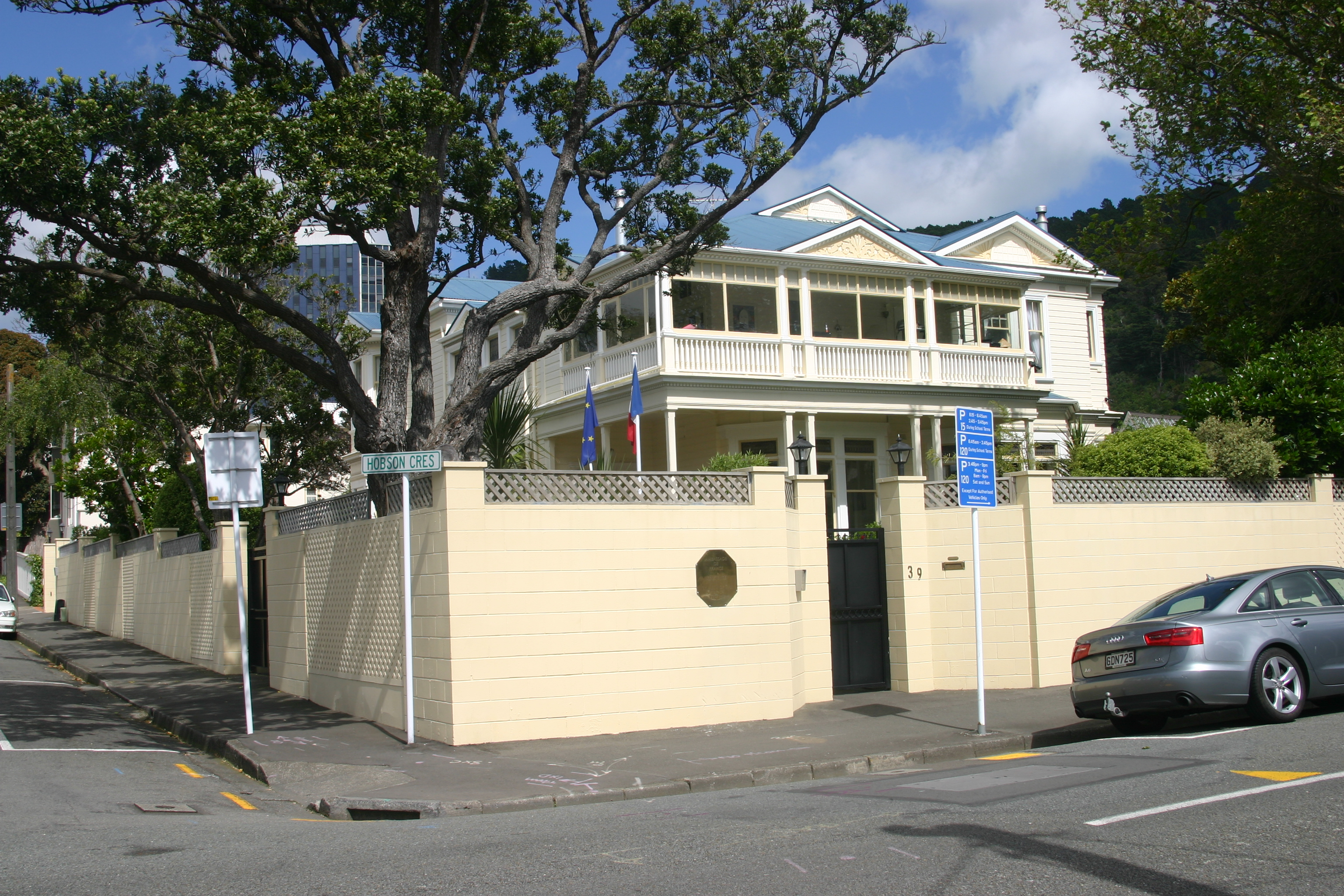
Residence of the Ambassador of France

Hobson Street

- Charles Abraham (bishop of Wellington)
- Charles Barron (1834–1911), Reporter
- Harold Beauchamp #8
- Alfred Brandon (politician), New Zealand politician
- Alfred Brandon (mayor) (1854–1938), New Zealand mayor
- Alfred Brandon (lawyer) (1883-1974), Lawyer and WWI military aviator
- William Henry Clayton (1823-1877), Tasmanian-born colonial architect

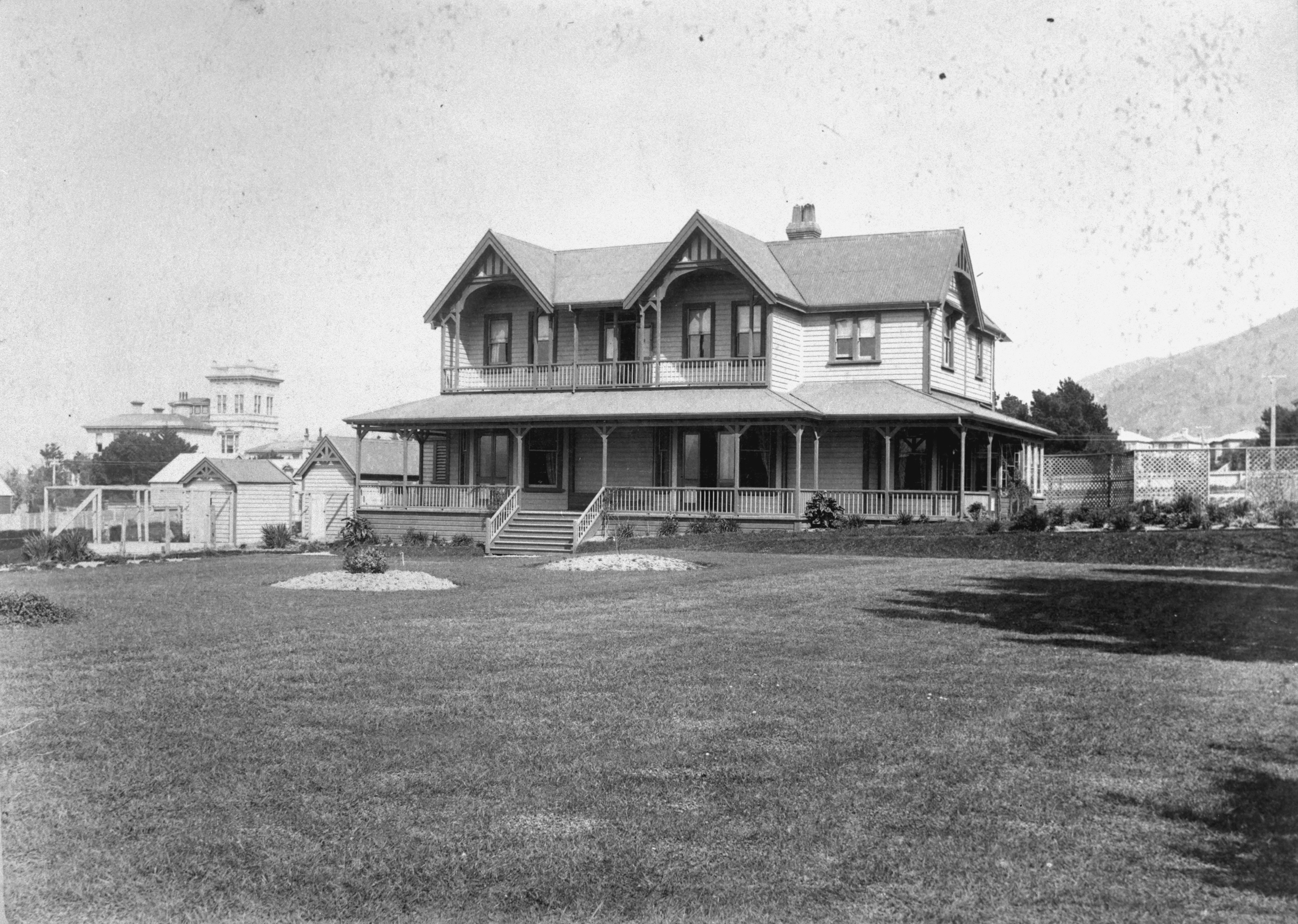
Robert Pharazyn's house T C Williams's tower in the background

- Charles Clifford
- John Duncan (1839–1919) now the site of the Australian High Commission
- Robert Hart (politician)
- Charles Beard Izard
- Walter Johnston #6
- Jacob Joseph (merchant)
- Arthur Myers, Cabinet Minister
- Evelyn Margaret Page #20
- Robert Pharazyn merchant and runholder
- William Pharazyn merchant and runholder
- Robert Stains
- Thomas Coldham Williams (1825–1912) runholder now Queen Margaret College

Tinakori Road

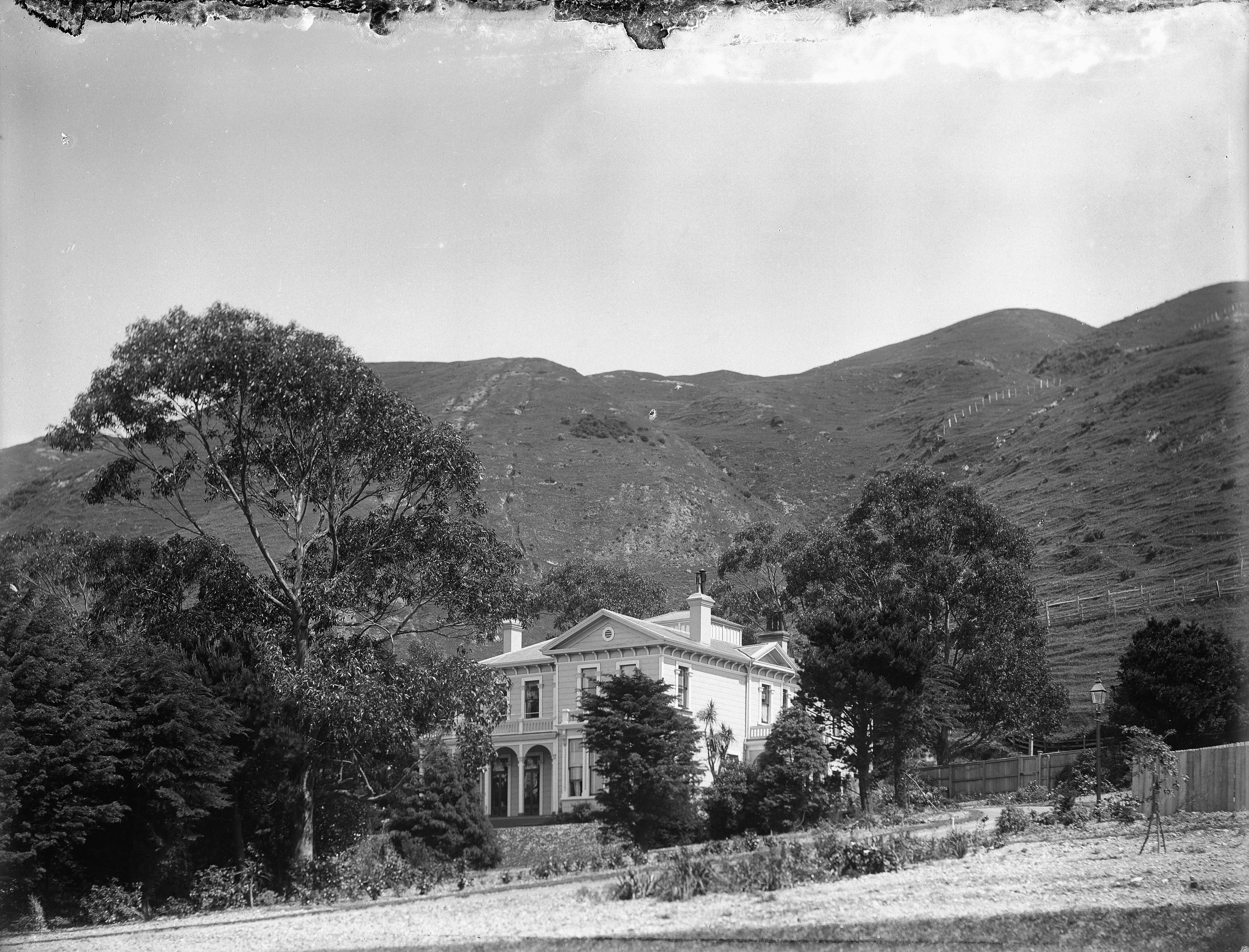
W H Levin's house in Tinakori Road

- Harold Beauchamp #25 and 133
- Elsdon Best
- Isaac Featherston land now Newman Terrace
- George Hunter (mayor)
- Nathaniel Levin merchant
- William Levin merchant and runholder now Pendennis, #15 Burnell Avenue
- Douglas Lilburn #22 Ascot Street
- Katherine Mansfield (Note: both her birthplace and her family's residence after 1898 at #133 Tinakori Road — destroyed for the motorway.)
- Andrew Todd (New Zealand)

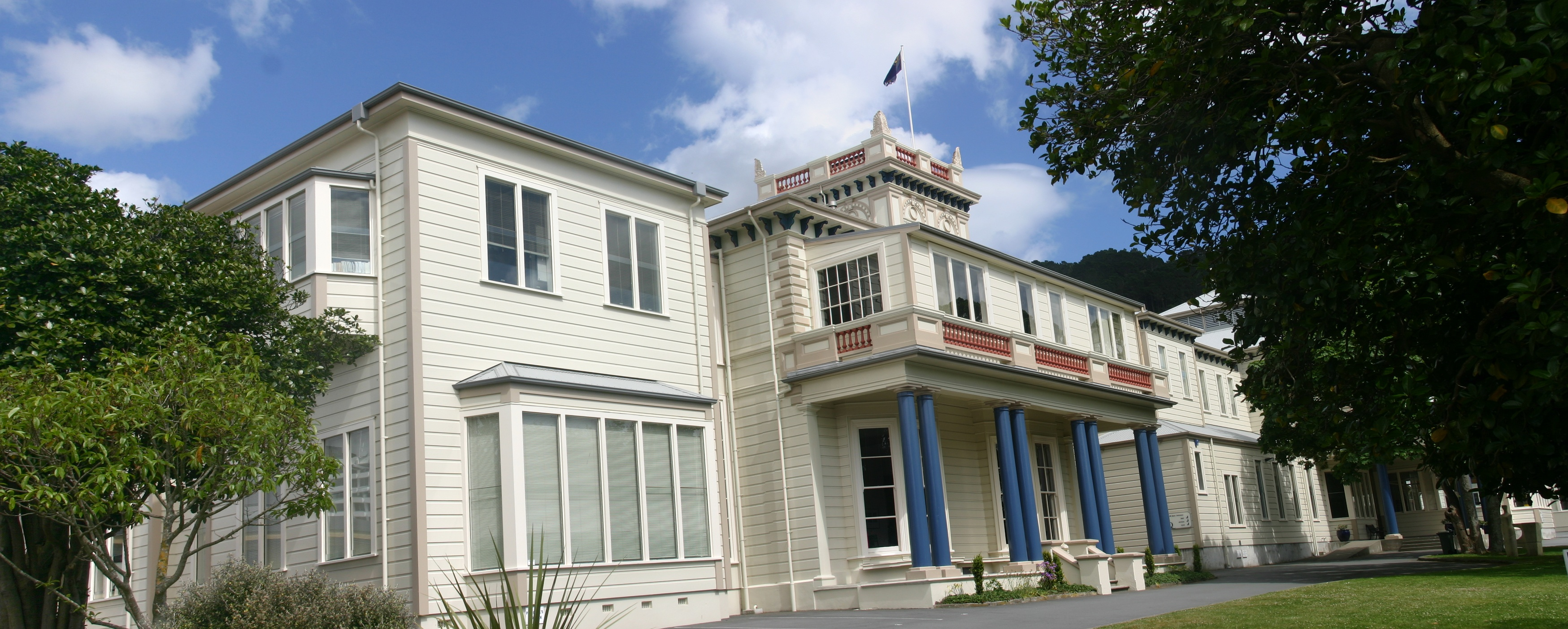
Queen Margaret College 2012 T C Williams's house is said to have had more than 30 rooms

Fitzherbert Terrace

- John Johnston (New Zealand politician) merchant and runholder, driveway Katherine Avenue, Queen Margaret College and Thorndon tennis club courts
- Harold Beauchamp #47

Hawkestone Street and Portland Crescent

- Joseph Nathan merchant, founded Glaxo now GlaxoSmithKline

Hill Street

- Charles Hayward Izard #21
- Jonas Woodward

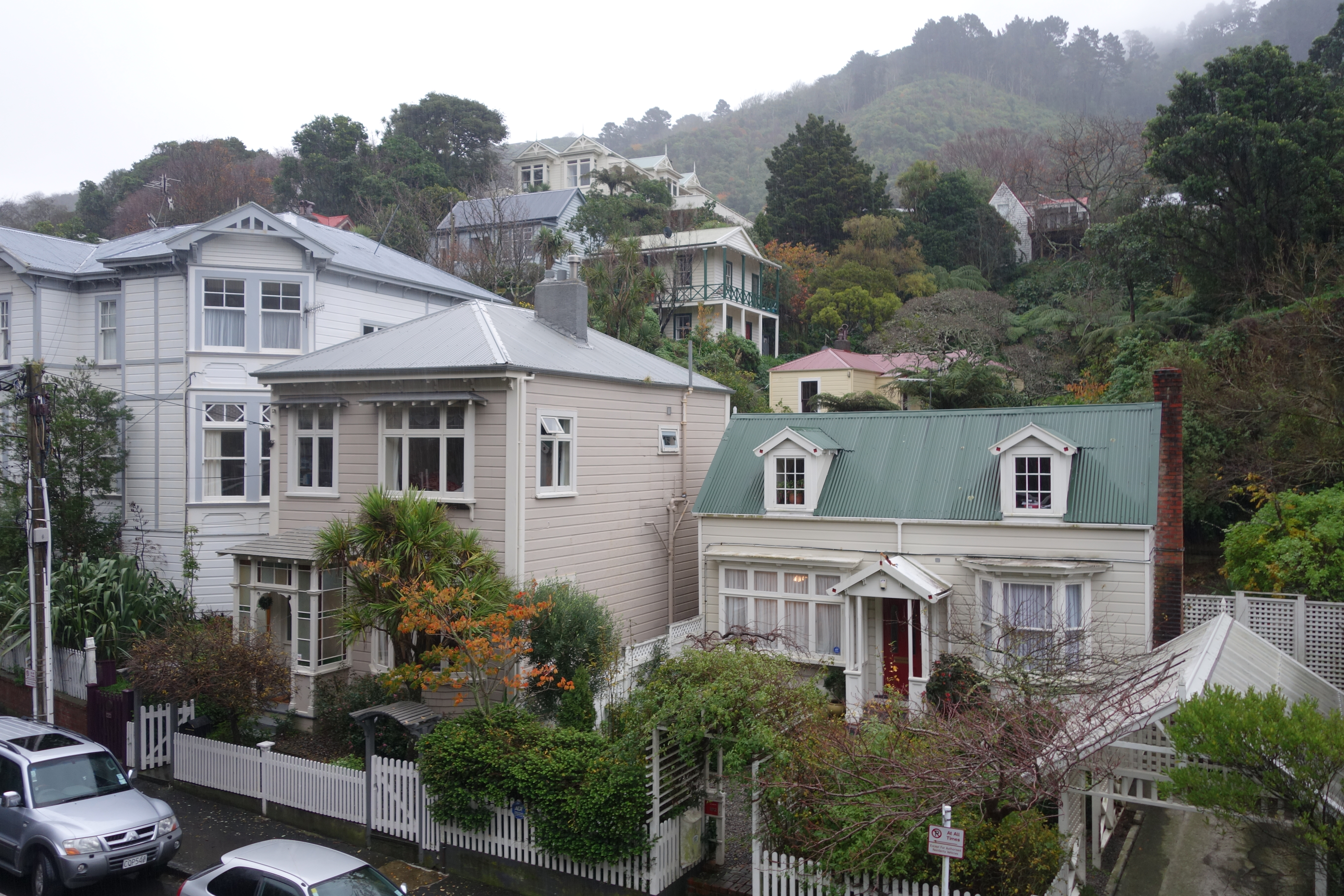
Sydney Street West. Rita Angus's cottage with red roof and yellow walls

Sydney Street West

- Rita Angus #194a

Bowen Street

- Alexander Turnbull #25
- Bowen Street Hospital

Murphy Street

- Arthur Donald Stuart Duncan
- Robin Cooke took the suburb's name when raised to a life peerage

Thorndon Quay

- George Friend

Glenmore Street

Many embassies, high commissions and consulates are located in Thorndon including: the US, Chinese, Cuban, German, Italian, Philippine, Thai and Turkish Embassies; the Australian, British, Canadian, Cook Islands, Fijian, Indian, and Niue High Commissions; and the Norwegian and Swedish Consulates-General.

=== Thorndon Esplanade ===
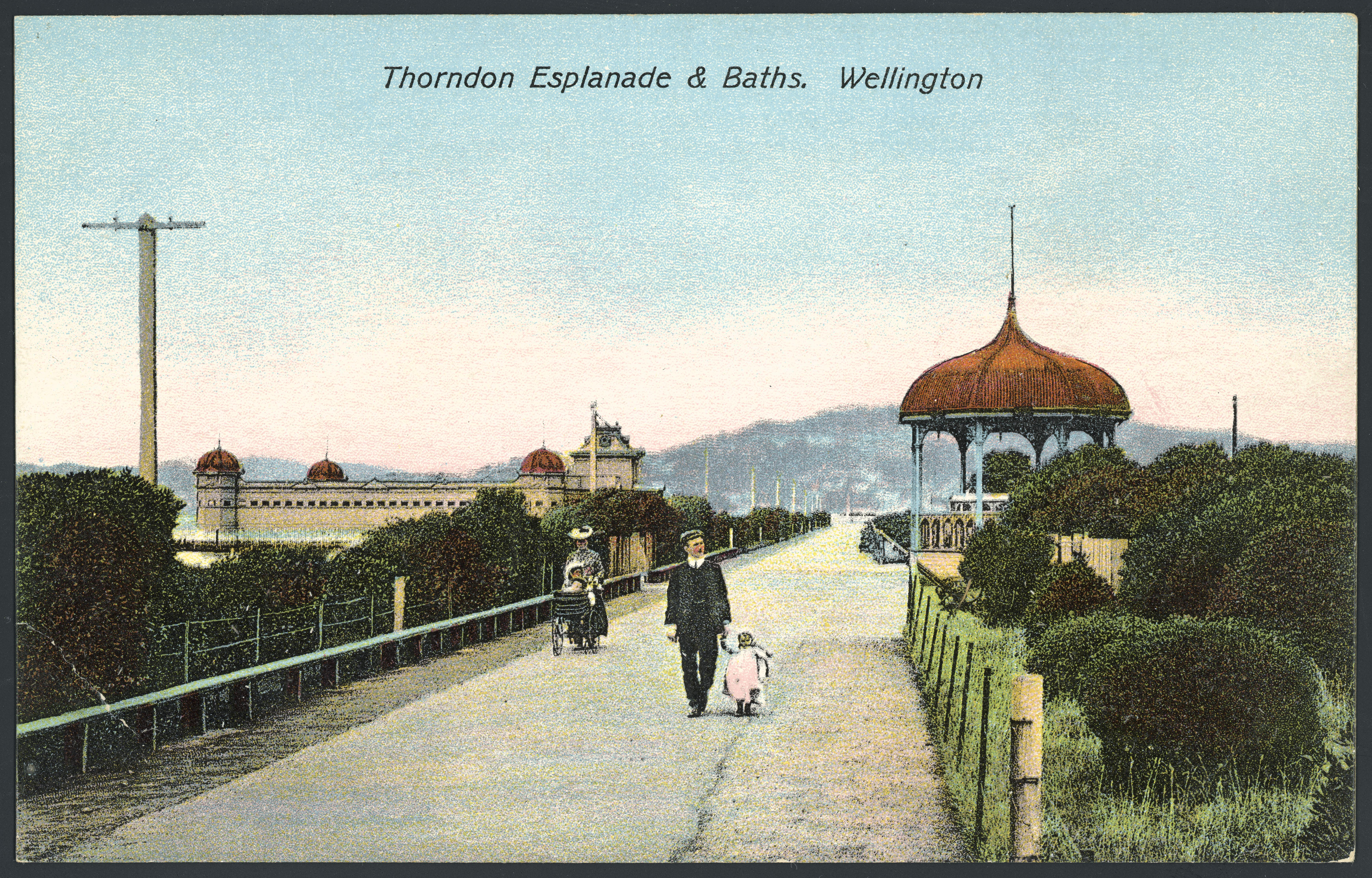
Thorndon Esplanade ca. 1905

"Wellington's Show Walk". Thorndon Esplanade with its baths and shrubs lies beneath Aotea Quay. Its band rotunda was sent to Central Park in 1921. Built at the end of the 1880s on the reclamation of the Manawatu Railway Company and intended to be a place of fashionable display it did not survive the first World War. It had become dirty and disreputable suffering from the increased activity in the smoky railway yards alongside. Its coprosmas and "gallant pohutukawas" never grew larger seeming to lack any care from the City Council but the wind and the poor soil and the grimy railway yard discouraged plants and visitors. "Lovers seemed to monopolise the gardens in the evenings".

The salt water baths were closed in 1920 and the superstructure moved to Evans Bay for dressing sheds. New baths opened in Murphy Street in November 1924 with certain hours set aside for mixed bathing.
