= Thorndon School =

Location
- 20 Turnbull Street, Thorndon, Wellington, New Zealand; 41.2742°S 174.7797°E

Information
- Type: Full Primary (Year 0–8)
- Established: 5 April 1852; 174 years ago
- Ministry of Education Institution no.: 3040
- Principal: Etuale Togia
- Enrolment: 300
- Socio-economic decile: 10
- Website: thorndon.school.nz

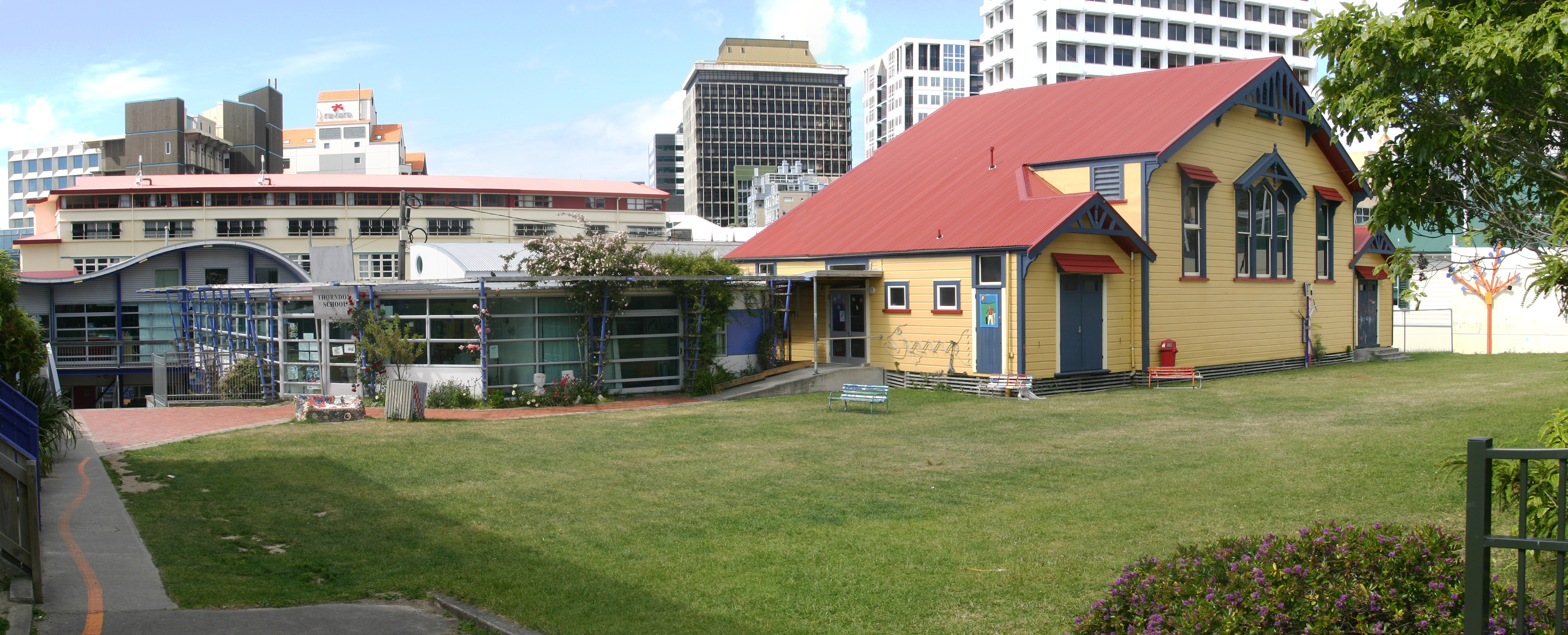
Thorndon school from Turnbull Street.

Thorndon School is a New Zealand primary and intermediate school located in the suburb of Thorndon, Wellington, New Zealand.

It was first established on 5 April 1852 as St Paul's School in Sydney Street. After initial success, the school's reputation declined until William Mowbray took over as headmaster in 1859. He broadened the curriculum to an extent that his methods were copied by other Wellington schools. In 1873, the school was taken over by the education board of the Wellington Province, and Mowbray was kept on as headmaster. Around that time, the name was changed to Thorndon School, and it moved to a new site in 1880. Mowbray retired in 1902 after 43 as headmaster.

The school burned down in 1900 and the fire destroyed the school library's 1000 books.

Since then the school and the district have been through many changes. In the early part of last century Thorndon was the largest school in the city, and housed the Teachers Training College for a while. By the early 1990s the roll was down to under 100 but over the past 10 or 12 years the school has grown, in percentage terms, more than almost any other school in the Wellington area and the roll is now over 300. During the year 2000 two new classrooms were built as well as a new administration area. In the year 2002 the Board of Trustees introduced an enrolment scheme to manage the roll. During 2003 the school library was extended and refurbished and in 2004/2005 another new classroom was added while a number of older rooms were refurbished.

At the beginning of 2012 the Kimi Ora site was incorporated into Thorndon School and given the name: Ata Kimi Ora. In term 2 of 2012 the 'Noddy House', block D, was modified to become a classroom.

In spite of its small foot print the school enjoys good facilities, with two grassed playing fields and a sealed netball/basketball court. During the summer the children swim at Thorndon Pool. In 1992 the Board of Trustees had an Adventure Playground built with locally raised funds and this has further enhanced the facilities. This was re-developed in 2006 and further work was undertaken in 2007. In 1999 a hall was donated to the school and moved onto its field. While this reduced the grassed area, the benefits of having a hall outweighed the negatives. In 2005 a kitchen and toilets were added. The hall was reroofed in 2010 with assistance from The Wellington City Council Heritage Fund. This hall, the Old St Paul's Schoolroom, has some historic links with the school, having been moved here from the original school site in Kate Sheppard Place. It is also, reputedly, the setting for the Katherine Mansfield short story, “Her First Ball”.

The school buildings and playground were rebuilt/modernised in 2020/2021.

As of 2025 the principal is Etuale Togia.

Notable alumni include judge Michael Myers.
