= Lucy Mansel =

New Zealand homemaker and community worker

Lucy Mansel (c.1831–22 January 1916) was a New Zealand homemaker and community worker. She was born in County Clare, Ireland on c.1831.
