= Vince McGlone =

New Zealand military personnel (1916–2014)

Vincent Edmund McGlone (23 March 1916 – 13 March 2014) was a New Zealand seaman and television personality. He was one of the last survivors of the Battle of the River Plate and New Zealand's oldest naval veteran.

== Biography ==
McGlone was born in 1916 in the Auckland suburb of Kingsland, the son of a local policeman. He enlisted in the New Zealand Division of the Royal Navy in 1932 and was promoted to ordinary seaman in 1934. He served as a gunner on HMS Diomede before promotion to able seaman and transfer to HMS (later HMNZS) Achilles.

On the morning of 13 December 1939, McGlone was serving as a gunner on Achilles when she, alongside Ajax and Exeter, engaged the German pocket battleship Admiral Graf Spee in the Battle of the River Plate. He later served on HMNZS Gambia and saw occupation service in Japan. He retired from the navy with the rank of quartermaster in 1946. His awards included the Atlantic Star, the Pacific Star, the War Medal 1939–1945, the New Zealand War Service Medal and the New Zealand Service Medal 1946–1949.

For 20 years, McGlone ran a joinery factory in the Northland town of Kaikohe.

In 2012, McGlone was the face of a naval recruiting advertisement on television for the New Zealand Defence Force, in which he recited the New Zealand national anthem.

McGlone died in 2014. He was one of the last surviving veterans of the Battle of the River Plate from either side and was believed to be New Zealand's oldest surviving naval veteran at the time of his death. The galley at the Devonport Naval Base is named the Vince McGlone Galley in his honour.
