= Garth Chester =

New Zealand furniture designer

- Born: Garnet Campbell Chester; 1916; South Africa
- Died: 16 June 1968 (aged 52); Waiheke
- Known for: Furniture design
- Notable work: Astoria Chair, Curvesse Chair, Bikini Chair

Garnet Campbell "Garth" Chester (1916 – 16 June 1968) was a New Zealand furniture designer.

== Early life ==
Chester was born in South Africa in 1916.

== Career ==
He established the furniture firm, Originals in Penrose, Auckland, and later set up a showroom in France Street (now called Mercury Lane), just off Karangahape Road in Auckland. Several of his designs became highly popular, including the Astoria Chair, the Bikini Chair and the Curvesse Chair, the latter "an undisputed icon of New Zealand design," according to Douglas Lloyd Jenkins. He died in 1968, aged 52.

Curvesse Chair was designed in 1944, that seem to defy gravity, is made out of sheets of plywood.

Bikini Chair was designed in 1955, was considered too sexy for many housewives at the time. The inspiration was from the bikini swimwear which was very popular at the time.

== Collections ==
His work is held in the collections of Museum of New Zealand Te Papa Tongarewa and Auckland War Memorial Museum.
