= Clifford Dalton =

New Zealand nuclear scientist

(George) Clifford James Dalton (20 May 1916 – 17 July 1961) was a New Zealand nuclear scientist and inventor of the fast breeder reactor.

== Early life and education ==
Son of New Zealand-born parents, carpenter and builder George Dalton and teacher Jessie (née Robson), Dalton attended Auckland Grammar School and read engineering at Auckland College and Canterbury College (BSc 1937, BE 1939), being awarded a Rhodes Scholarship in 1937. In 1939, having suffered from polio, he entered Oriel College, Oxford.

== Career ==
Dalton was commissioned into the Royal Air Force Volunteer Reserve in 1941, and allocated to the Technical Branch, where he would carry out radar research until the end of the war. He was demobilised with the rank of Squadron-Leader, and returned to Oxford where he took his doctorate in engineering in 1947. That year, he joined the Atomic Energy Research Establishment at Harwell in England, where his work on development of a fast-fission reactor was considered impressive, leading to his appointment by Sir John Cockcroft as head of a fast-reactor group in the engineering division. Although design issues were swiftly rectified, the lack of plutonium meant the construction of the reactor could not be justified. By 1960, Dalton and George Lockett held the patent for a fast reactor cooling system.

In 1949, Dalton and his family moved to New Zealand, where he was to take up a chair in the mechanical engineering faculty at Auckland University College; shortly afterward he was appointed dean of engineering, and inherited a ramshackle facility and unhappy colleagues, but his abilities and manner led to much improved circumstances. The Daltons went to Sydney in 1955 when he was appointed chief engineer and deputy chief scientist of the Australian Atomic Energy Commission, later going to England when seconded to the Harwell facility for training. Dalton was at this time converted to high-temperature, gas-cooled systems from his previous focus on fast reactors, and advised Dutch authorities and industry on their research-reactor programme before returning to Sydney. He was a director of the commission's Nuclear Research Establishment at Lucas Heights, Sydney from 1957 until the time of his death.

== Personal life ==
During the Second World War, in 1942, he met Women's Auxiliary Air Force radar-operator Catherine Robina Graves (daughter of the writer Robert Graves); they married that year at Aldershot registry office. They had five children.

In 1953, Dalton was awarded the Queen Elizabeth II Coronation Medal.

In her book Without Hardware Catherine Dalton alleged that her husband was murdered; she claimed that the Bogle-Chandler deaths were intended to prevent Bogle, a friend of Dalton's, from investigating her husband's death. Catherine considered that her husband subjected his family to a "regime of parsimony and neglect", and claimed after his death that, as early as 1955, she had detected what she considered his "schizophrenic behaviour", leading to "caprice and violence" in his private life in stark contrast to the admirable man his colleagues considered him to be. She refused to divorce or leave Dalton, attributing his illness to poisoning by "malevolent elements of the intelligence community".
