= Henry Wilding =

Henry Wilding (20 August 1844, Stepney, London –1916) was a New Zealand banker, timber miller, farmer, broker and social reformer. He was born in London, England in 1844.
