= Catherine Augusta Francis =

New Zealand teacher and headmistress

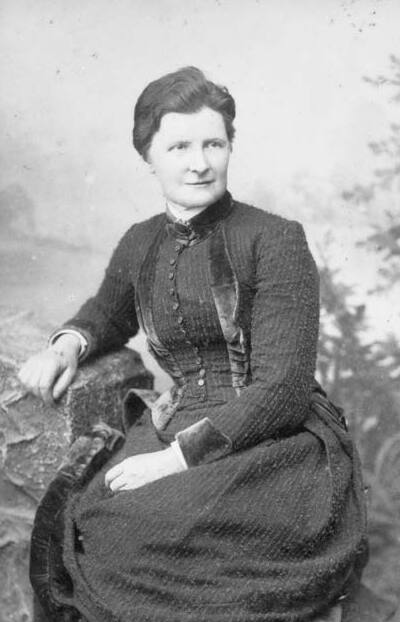
Catherine Augusta Francis in 1887 or 1888

Catherine Augusta Francis (16 September 1836 – 19 October 1916) was a New Zealand teacher and headmistress.

== Biography ==
She was born in London, England on 16 September 1836.
