= Gordon Bromley =

New Zealand long-distance runner

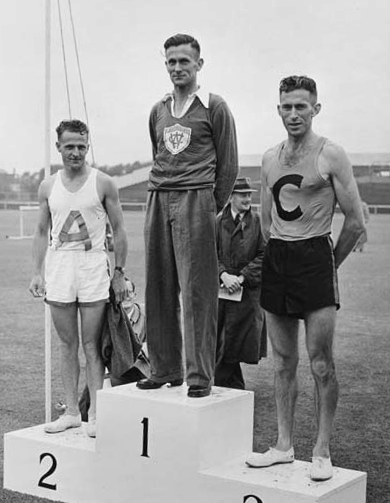
- Bromley (centre) at the 1949 national marathon championships

Personal information
- Full name: Gordon Bennett Bromley
- Born: 14 June 1916 Scotts Ferry, Manawatū-Whanganui, New Zealand
- Died: 17 April 2006 (aged 89) Marton, New Zealand

Sport
- Sport: Athletics
- Events: Marathon, cross country

Achievements and titles
- Personal best: Marathon – 2:40:01

Gordon Bennett Bromley (14 June 1916 – 17 April 2006) was a long-distance runner from New Zealand. Competing in the marathon he won five national titles and placed seventh at the 1950 British Empire Games. He also won the Wellington 20-mile cross-country race in 1949 and 1950, improving the course record by almost five minutes.

Bromley was born at Scotts Ferry, but lived most of his life in or near Marton, New Zealand. He ran long distances from school age, and later averaged 120 km per week in training, often exceeding 160 km. One year he ran nearly 20,000 km. His long-time rival Arthur Lydiard once remarked: "I could never beat Brom in a marathon. He had too many miles in his legs." In 1937 Bromley married Patricia. They had four children.
