= William Mowbray =

William Mowbray (25 December 1835 – 21 June 1916) was a New Zealand teacher and musician. He was born in Leicester, Leicestershire, England on 25 December 1835. He was headmaster of St Paul's School in Wellington, which changed its name to Thorndon School during his tenure, for 43 years.
