= Eveline Willett Cunnington =

Social reformer, feminist, lecturer, writer (1849–1916)

Eveline Willet Cunnington
- Born: Eveline Willett Leach; April 23, 1849; Briton Ferry, Glamorganshire, Wales
- Died: July 30, 1916 (aged 67); Sumner, New Zealand
- Other names: Eveline Willett Baines
- Citizenship: New Zealand

Eveline Willett Cunnington (23 April 1849 – 30 July 1916) was a New Zealand social reformer, feminist, lecturer and writer. Cunnington was a strong advocate against the exploitation of children and young women and for prison reform. In later years, she advocated for socialism and labor reform.

== Early life and education ==
Cunnington was born Eveline Willett Leach in Briton Ferry, Glamorganshire, Wales, on 23 April 1849. Her father, Robert Valentine Leach, owned a lunatic asylum. As a young woman, Cunnington wanted to get a job, but her father would not allow it. He sent her to school in France, after which she spent time in Italy and Germany. Back in England, Cunnington attended at Queen's College in London for three years.

In 1875, Cunnington emigrated to Christchurch, New Zealand. On 8 April 1876, she married Capel Baines. The couple moved to South Australia, where he worked as a clerk. She experienced poverty; Cunnington later stated that this experience radicalized her feelings on the subject. In May 1875 Capel Baines was appointed Clerk of the Court and Collector of Customs at Port Lincoln, South Australia; in May 1879 he was appointed Harbour Master, etc, at Port Lincoln, and Collector of Jetty Dues, at Louth Bay; in July 1880 he was Clerk of the Local Court at Strathalbyn; and in July 1881 he was registrar of births, deaths, and marriages, for the district of Strathalbyn.

Cunnington had five children in Australia, two of whom died as infants.

In August 1883, on a visit to Cunnington's family at Castle Devizes, Wiltshire, England, Capel died of a heart attack. He had taken leave and travelled to England for his health.

She and her children then emigrated to Christchurch, New Zealand. On 18 December 1884, she married Herbert James Cunnington, an electrical engineer, in Leithfield. The couple had one daughter.

== Later life ==
In 1891, Cunnington became a member of the ladies' committee of the Canterbury Female Refuge, which assisted unmarried pregnant women, In 1895, she became a prison visitor, one of the first women to hold that position there. In 1896, Cunnington became a founding member of the National Council of Women of New Zealand. She also helped found a branch of the Fabian Society in Canterbury.

In politics, Cunnington campaigned to raise the age of consent and to make it illegal for minor girls to work in brothels Cunnington believed that pimps and customers of prostitution should be arrested and prosecuted. She opposed the Contagious Diseases Acts due to the double standards it placed on women.

Cunnington also wanted to add more female employees in the prison system to combat the sexual exploitation of female inmates by male employees. She also campaigned for the education of prisoners. Cunnington assisted many young women released from prison, providing clothes and accommodation, often in her own home.

In 1904, Cunnington went to England for a three-year stay. During this period, she met the writer Mary Ernest Boole, the poor-law guardian, Ina Stansfield, Millicent Garrett Fawcett, Lady Isabella Caroline Somerset and Susan B. Anthony. After surviving a serious illness, Cunnington returned to Christchurch in 1908.

Back in New Zealand, Cunnington spent the next two years in education efforts with older girls and other charitable occupations. In 1910, she started giving lectures to working men regarding socialism and Christianity in Christchurch and Wellington.

By 1913, Cunnington's health had started to decline. However, she continued to advocate for socialism and the rights of organized labor. Herbert Cunnington died in 2015.

Cunnington died on 30 July 1916 at her holiday home in Sumner. Her written works were published posthumously in 1918.
