= Robert Menzies (cricketer) =

New Zealand cricketer (1916–1983)

Personal information
- Full name: Robert Edward James Menzies
- Born: 17 April 1916; Melbourne, Victoria, Australia
- Died: 11 September 1983 (aged 67); Palmerston North, New Zealand
- Batting: Right-handed
- Bowling: Right-arm medium pace
- Role: Batsman

Domestic team information
- Years: Team
- 1936–1941: Canterbury
- 1939: New Zealand
- 1942–1947: Wellington

Career statistics
Competition	First-class
Matches	17
Runs scored	892
Batting average	29.73
100s/50s	1/5
Top score	163
Catches/stumpings	11/–
- Source: CricketArchive, 10 April 2012

Robert Edward James Menzies (17 April 1916 – 11 September 1983) was an Australian-born New Zealand cricketer who played 17 first-class matches between 1936 and 1946, mainly for Canterbury and Wellington in New Zealand domestic matches.

== Biography ==
Menzies was born in Melbourne, Victoria, in April 1916, and emigrated to New Zealand in the early 1930s. He made his debut for Canterbury in the 1936–37 Plunket Shield, the New Zealand domestic first-class cricket competition, on 25 December 1936, in a match against Auckland at Lancaster Park. He scored five runs and ten runs in the first and second innings, respectively, batting seventh in each. In his second match, against Otago in February 1937, Menzies was promoted to bat third in the first innings, making 12 runs, but returned to number seven in the second innings, in which he made his first half-century, 61 runs, before being bowled by Ted Badcock.

Menzies batted in several different positions during the 1937–38 season, even opening the batting in one match against Wellington. He recorded his second half-century in a match against Auckland in January 1938, scoring 51 runs in Canterbury's first innings in a game they later lost by an innings and 193 runs. Menzies began the 1938–39 season with scores of 8 and 33 in the match against Auckland, but followed this with an innings of 163 runs in the match against Wellington, which was to be his highest first-class score and his only first-class century. An innings of 80 not out in Canterbury's win over Otago the following month led to Menzies' selection in a New Zealand representative side that played a touring English professional side under the support of Sir Julien Cahn in March 1939 at the Basin Reserve in Wellington. Both sides included a number of international players, with New Zealand including six Test cricketers, including the Test wicket-keeper, Eric Tindill, and Merv Wallace, who would later captain New Zealand. Cahn's XI included English Test cricketers Joe Hardstaff, Buddy Oldfield, and Peter Smith, as well as New Zealander Stewie Dempster, who had been playing for Leicestershire in England. The first two days of the match were washed out due to rain, with each team being reduced to one innings. The match finished in a draw, with Menzies making 14 runs in his team's innings before being stumped by Cecil Maxwell off the bowling of Jack Walsh.

During the Second World War, the Plunket Shield was not contested, but a number of inter-provincial matches were designated first-class, with Menzies playing one match in each of 1941, 1942, and 1943. Prior to the 1941–42 season, he switched to playing for Wellington, having played a total of 12 matches for Canterbury, in which he scored 642 runs at an average of 30.57, and took ten catches. Menzies played out the remainder of his career at Wellington. Plunket Shield competition resumed for the 1945–46 season; however, Menzies did not return until the 1946–47 season, when he played two matches, against Auckland and his old team, Canterbury. He failed to score over 40 in either of these games, which were his last first-class matches. Menzies died in Palmerston North on 11 September 1983.
