= Thistle Inn =

Historic pub in Wellington, New Zealand

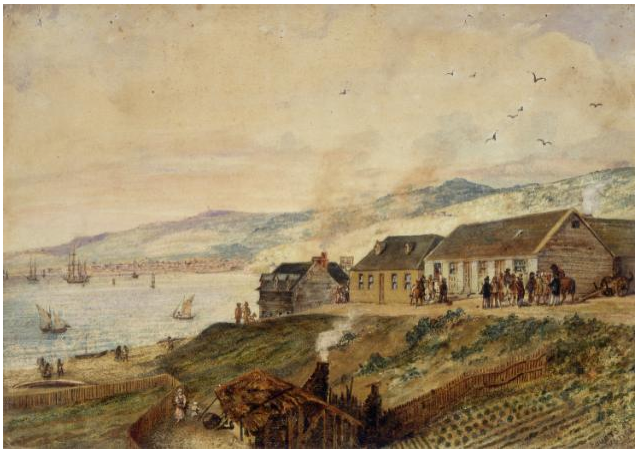
- A painting of the Thistle Inn and the Courthouse on lower Mulgrave Street, close to the water's edge. There is a horseman, with lawyers and other people outside the courthouse. A European home with two chimneys is below the road on the left (ca 1843)
- Interactive map of the Thistle Inn area

General information
- Architectural style: Edwardian
- Location: Mulgrave Street, Wellington, New Zealand
- Coordinates: 41.2777°S 174.7796°E
- Completed: 1840, rebuilt 1866

Heritage New Zealand – Category 1
- Designated: 27-Jul-1988
- Reference no.: 1439

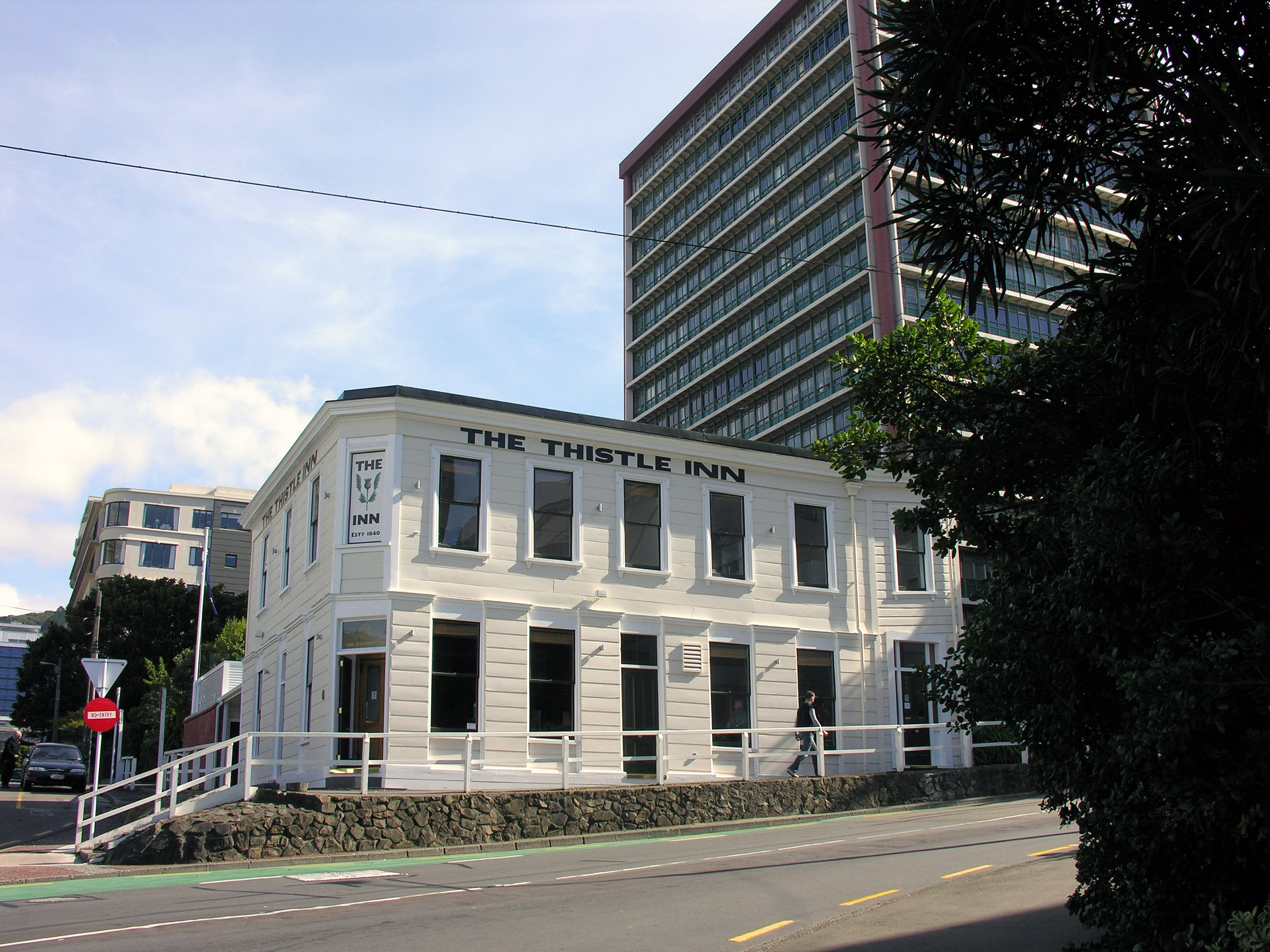
The Thistle Inn in 2005

The Thistle Inn is one of New Zealand's oldest public houses. It was originally built in 1840 by William Couper, and the name 'Thistle Inn' probably comes from his Scottish background. It received the second liquor licence issued in New Zealand. In its early years its clientele were largely working men and sailors, and in later years it was frequented by railway and government workers.

The original single-storey timber building was destroyed by a fire in 1866, but it was rebuilt as a two-storey building within months. Up until the reclamation of Wellington Harbour in 1876 the building was only a few metres from the shoreline and patrons often arrived by boat, including, according to legend, the Ngāti Toa warrior chief Te Rauparaha. The Thistle Inn was featured in "Leves Amores", a short story by Katherine Mansfield, written in 1907. In 1927 the hotelkeeper was fined for accepting cigarettes in payment for alcohol.

In the 1960s the building's interior was renovated in a modern style, and in the mid-2000s the building was renovated in a more era-appropriate historic style. These renovations also included earthquake-strengthening, and conversion of the motel rooms upstairs to function rooms.

The building is classified as a Category 1 Historic Place (places of "special or outstanding historical or cultural heritage significance or value") by Heritage New Zealand. In 2008 the Hospitality Association declared that the Thistle Inn was New Zealand's oldest pub. In 2015 The Dominion Post said it was "the oldest tavern and restaurant in New Zealand still operating on its original site".
