= Athletics at the 1938 British Empire Games – Women's 220–110–220–110 yards relay =

The women's 220–110–220–110 yards relay event at the 1938 British Empire Games was held on 12 February at the Sydney Cricket Ground in Sydney, Australia.

== Results ==
Rank	Nation	Athletes	Time	Notes
1st place, gold medalist(s)	Australia	Decima Norman, Joan Woodland, Jean Coleman, Thelma Peake	1:15.2	
2nd place, silver medalist(s)	England	Kathleen Stokes, Ethel Raby, Dorothy Saunders, Winifred Jeffrey	1:17.2e	15 yards behind
3rd place, bronze medalist(s)	Canada	Violet Montgomery, Barbara Howard, Aileen Meagher, Jeanette Dolson	1:19.0e	15 yards behind
