= Athletics at the 1938 British Empire Games – Women's 100 yards =

Women's 100 yards at the Commonwealth Games

The women's 100 yards event at the 1938 British Empire Games was held on 5 February at the Sydney Cricket Ground in Sydney, Australia.

== Medalists ==
Gold	Silver	Bronze
Decima Norman; Australia	Joyce Walker; Australia	Jeanette Dolson; Canada

== Results ==
=== Heats ===
Qualification: First 3 in each heat (Q) qualify directly for the semifinals.

Rank	Heat	Name	Nationality	Time	Notes
1	1	Barbara Burke	South Africa	11.4	Q
2	1	Joyce Walker	Australia	11.4e	Q, inches behind
3	1	Barbara Howard	Canada	??.?	Q, 1 yard behind
4	1	Ethel Raby	England	??.?	
5	1	Rona Tong	New Zealand	??.?	
1	2	Thelma Peake	Australia	11.5	Q
2	2	Aileen Meagher	Canada	??.?	Q, inches behind
3	2	Dorothy Saunders	England	??.?	Q, 0.5 yards behind
4	2	Doris Strachan	New Zealand	11.8e	
1	3	Jeanette Dolson	Canada	11.4	Q
2	3	Joan Woodland	Australia	11.5e	Q, 1 yard behind
3	3	Kathleen Stokes	England	??.?	Q, 1.5 yards behind
4	3	Margaret McDowall	Scotland	??.?	
1	4	Decima Norman	Australia	11.1	Q, GR
2	4	Doreen Lumley	New Zealand	11.6e	Q, 4 yards behind
3	4	Winnifred Jeffrey	England	??.?	Q, 2 yards behind
4	4	Isabel Bleasdale	Canada	11.9e	

=== Semifinals ===
Qualification: First 3 in each heat (Q) qualify directly for the final.

Rank	Heat	Name	Nationality	Time	Notes
1	1	Decima Norman	Australia	11.1	Q, =GR
2	1	Joyce Walker	Australia	11.4e	Q, 2.5 yards behind
3	1	Jeanette Dolson	Canada	??.?	Q, 1 yard behind
4	1	Dorothy Saunders	England	11.6e	
5	1	Aileen Meagher	Canada	11.7e	
6	1	Kathleen Stokes	England	11.9e	
1	2	Barbara Burke	South Africa	11.1	Q, =GR
2	2	Joan Woodland	Australia	11.2e	Q, 1 foot behind
3	2	Barbara Howard	Canada	??.?	Q, 1 yard behind
4	2	Doreen Lumley	New Zealand	??.?	
	2	Thelma Peake	Australia	DQ	
	2	Winnifred Jeffrey	England	DNS	

=== Final ===
Rank	Name	Nationality	Time	Notes
1st place, gold medalist(s)	Decima Norman	Australia	11.1	=GR
2nd place, silver medalist(s)	Joyce Walker	Australia	11.3e	1.5 yards behind
3rd place, bronze medalist(s)	Jeanette Dolson	Canada	11.4e	1 yard behind
4	Barbara Burke	South Africa	11.5e	
5	Joan Woodland	Australia	11.5e	
6	Barbara Howard	Canada	11.6e	
