= Athletics at the 1938 British Empire Games – Women's 220 yards =

Female event is Sydney 1938 Olympics

Women's 220 yards at the Commonwealth Games

The women's 220 yards event at the 1938 British Empire Games was held on 10 and 12 February at the Sydney Cricket Ground in Sydney, Australia.

== Medalists ==
Gold	Silver	Bronze
Decima Norman; Australia	Jean Coleman; Australia	Eileen Wearne; Australia

== Results ==
=== Heats ===
Held on 10 February

Qualification: First 3 in each heat (Q) qualify directly for the semifinals.

Rank	Heat	Name	Nationality	Time	Notes
1	1	Decima Norman	Australia	24.9	Q, GR
2	1	Jeanette Dolson	Canada	??.?	Q, 8 yards behind
3	1	Gladys Lunn	England	26.3e	Q, 4 yards behind
4	1	Doris Strachan	New Zealand	??.?	3 yards behind
1	2	Jean Coleman	Australia	25.3	Q
2	2	Dorothy Saunders	England	??.?	Q, 2 yards behind
3	2	Margaret McDowall	Scotland	??.?	Q, 2 yards behind
4	2	Violet Montgomery	Canada	??.?	
1	3	Aileen Meagher	Canada	24.9	Q, =GR
2	3	Eileen Wearne	Australia	25.1e	Q, 1.5 yards behind
3	3	Mary Holloway	England	??.?	Q, 8 yards behind
	3	Doreen Lumley	New Zealand	DQ	
1	4	Barbara Burke	South Africa	25.4	Q
2	4	Irene Talbot	Australia	25.7e	Q, 2 yards behind
3	4	Kathleen Stokes	England	??.?	Q, 3 yards behind
4	4	Isabel Bleasdale	Canada	??.?	

=== Semifinals ===
Held on 10 February

Qualification: First 3 in each heat (Q) qualify directly for the final.

Rank	Heat	Name	Nationality	Time	Notes
1	1	Decima Norman	Australia	24.5	Q, GR
2	1	Barbara Burke	South Africa	25.2e	Q, 6 yards behind
3	1	Irene Talbot	Australia	25.4e	Q, 1.5 yards behind
4	1	Dorothy Saunders	England	??.?	
5	1	Mary Holloway	England	??.?	
6	1	Jeanette Dolson	Canada	??.?	
1	2	Aileen Meagher	Canada	25.1	Q
2	2	Jean Coleman	Australia	25.2e	Q, 0.5 yard behind
3	2	Eileen Wearne	Australia	25.2e	Q, inches behind
4	2	Kathleen Stokes	England	??.?	
5	2	Margaret McDowall	Scotland	??.?	
	2	Gladys Lunn	England	DNS	

=== Final ===
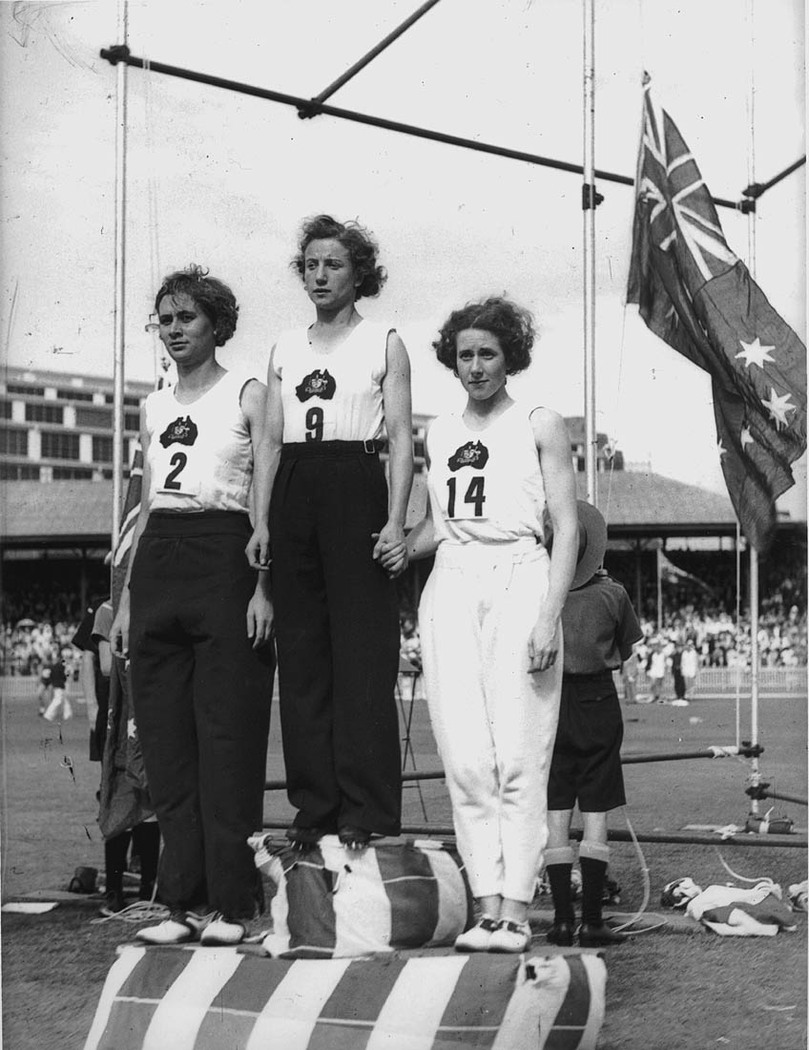
The medal winners

Held on 12 February

Rank	Name	Nationality	Time	Notes
1st place, gold medalist(s)	Decima Norman	Australia	24.7	
2nd place, silver medalist(s)	Jean Coleman	Australia	25.1e	3 yards behind
3rd place, bronze medalist(s)	Eileen Wearne	Australia	25.3e	2 yards behind
4	Aileen Meagher	Canada	25.5e	
5	Barbara Burke	South Africa	??.?	
6	Irene Talbot	Australia	??.?	
