= Athletics at the 1936 Summer Olympics – Women's 4 × 100 metres relay =

Women's 4 × 100 metres relay at the Games of the XI Olympiad
- Dates: August 8, 1936 (heats), August 9, 1936 (final)
- Competitors: from 8 nations
- Teams: 8
- Winning time: 46.9

Medalists
1st place, gold medalist(s)		Harriet Bland; Annette Rogers; Betty Robinson; Helen Stephens	United States
2nd place, silver medalist(s)		Eileen Hiscock; Violet Olney; Audrey Brown; Barbara Burke	Great Britain
3rd place, bronze medalist(s)		Dorothy Brookshaw; Mildred Dolson; Hilda Cameron; Aileen Meagher	Canada

The women's 4 × 100 metres relay event at the 1936 Olympic Games took place on August 8 and August 9. The American team won with a time of 46.9 s after the German team, which had been in the lead, dropped the baton on the final leg.

== Results ==
=== Heats ===
Heat 1

Rank	Country	Competitors	Time	Notes
1	United States	Harriet Bland, Annette Rogers, Betty Robinson, Helen Stephens	47.1	Q
2	Canada	Dorothy Brookshaw, Jeanette Dolson, Hilda Cameron, Aileen Meagher	48.0	Q
3	Netherlands	Kitty ter Braake, Fanny Blankers-Koen, Alida de Vries, Elisabeth Koning	48.4	Q
4	Austria	Charlotte Machmer, Johanna Vancura, Grete Neumann, Veronika Kohlbach	49.9	

Key: Q = Qualified

Heat 2

Rank	Country	Competitors	Time	Notes
1	Germany	Emmy Albus, Käthe Krauß, Marie Dollinger, Ilse Dörffeldt	46.4	Q, WR
2	Great Britain	Eileen Hiscock, Violet Olney, Audrey Brown, Barbara Burke	47.5	Q
3	Italy	Lidia Bongiovanni, Ondina Valla, Fernanda Bullano, Claudia Testoni	48.6	Q
4	Finland	Irja Lipasti, Ebba From, Raili Halttu, Rauni Essman	49.5	

Key: Q = Qualified, WR = World record

=== Final ===
Rank	Country	Competitors	Time	Notes
1st place, gold medalist(s)	United States	Harriet Bland, Annette Rogers, Betty Robinson, Helen Stephens	46.9	
2nd place, silver medalist(s)	Great Britain	Eileen Hiscock, Violet Olney, Audrey Brown, Barbara Burke	47.6	
3rd place, bronze medalist(s)	Canada	Dorothy Brookshaw, Jeanette Dolson, Hilda Cameron, Aileen Meagher	47.8	
4	Italy	Lidia Bongiovanni, Ondina Valla, Fernanda Bullano, Claudia Testoni	48.7	
5	Netherlands	Kitty ter Braake, Fanny Blankers-Koen, Alida de Vries, Elisabeth Koning	48.8	
	Germany	Emmy Albus, Käthe Krauß, Marie Dollinger, Ilse Dörffeldt		DSQ

Key: DSQ = Disqualified

In the heats, the German team set a world record of 46.4 s. In the final, they built a commanding lead, but their fourth runner, Ilse Dörffeldt, dropped the baton. The American team won in 46.9 s.
