= Eileen Wearne =

Australian sprinter

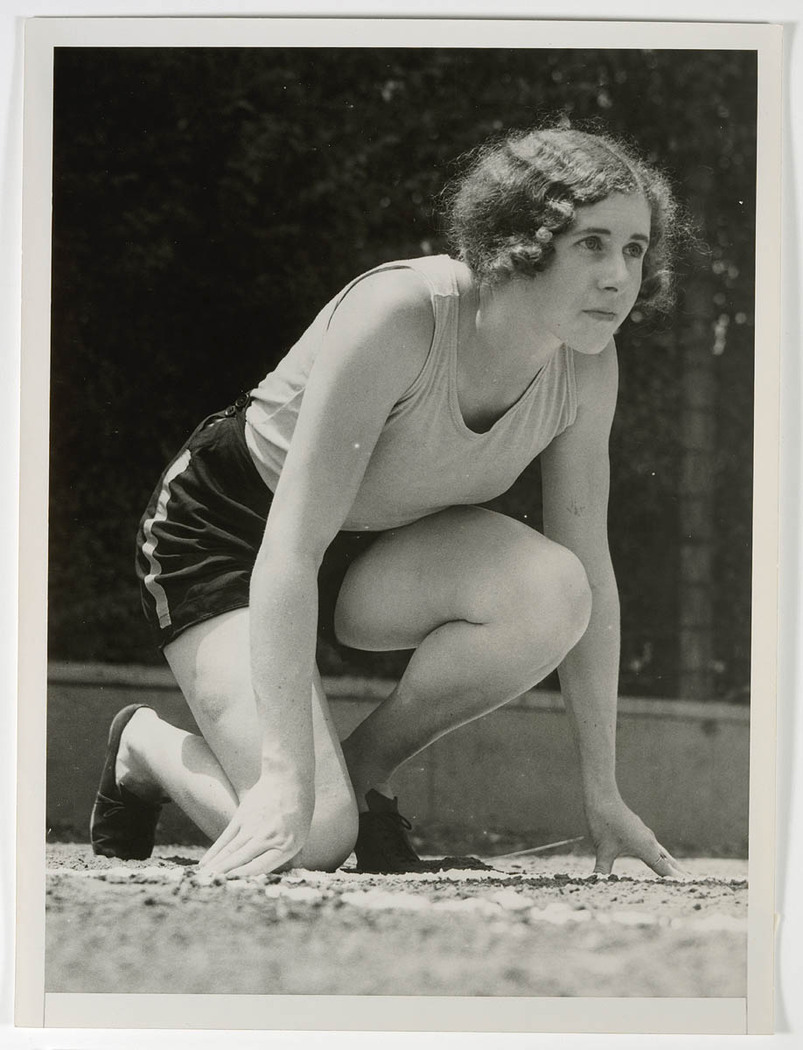
- Eileen Wearne training at Manual Arts High School, Los Angeles, 1932

Personal information
- Born: 30 January 1912 Enfield, New South Wales
- Died: 6 July 2007 (aged 95) Sydney, Australia
- Height: 1.60 m (5 ft 3 in)

Sport
- Sport: Athletics
- Events: 100 m, 200 m
- Club: Western Suburbs AAC, Sydney

Achievements and titles
- Personal bests: 100 m – 12.3 (1932); 200 m – 25.0 (1938)
Medal record
Representing Australia
British Empire Games
Gold medal – first place	1938 Sydney	3×110/220 yd
Bronze medal – third place	1938 Sydney	220 yards

Alice Eileen Wearne (30 January 1912 – 7 July 2007) was an Australian sprinter. She competed in the 1932 Summer Olympics, and won gold and bronze medals at the 1938 British Empire Games.

== Athletic career ==
Wearne was selected in the Australian Olympic team as a sprinter and was the second woman selected to represent Australia in athletics at the Olympic Games after Edith Robinson. She competed in the 100-metre sprint competition finishing fourth in her heat.

Wearne continued to participate in athletic events in Australia during the 1930s and won New South Wales and Australian championships enjoying a healthy rivalry with Robinson. However, she did not compete in the 1934 British Empire Games or 1936 Summer Olympics. She entered the 1938 British Empire Games which were held in Sydney. Wearne finished third in the 220-yard sprint behind fellow Australians Decima Norman and Jean Coleman. She was a member of the 440-yard relay gold medal team with Norman. Wearne was the first woman to represent Australia at both the Olympics and British Empire Games with Victorian high jumper Doris Carter.

== After athletics ==
Wearne continued to be active in the Olympic movement in Australia. She lived to be 95 making her Australia's longest-lived Olympian before her death in July 2007.
