= Athletics at the 1936 Summer Olympics – Women's 100 metres =

Women's 100 metres at the Games of the XI Olympiad
- Dates: August 3, 1936 (heats and semifinals); August 4, 1936 (final)

Medalists
1st place, gold medalist(s)		Helen Stephens; United States
2nd place, silver medalist(s)		Stanisława Walasiewicz; Poland
3rd place, bronze medalist(s)		Käthe Krauß; Germany

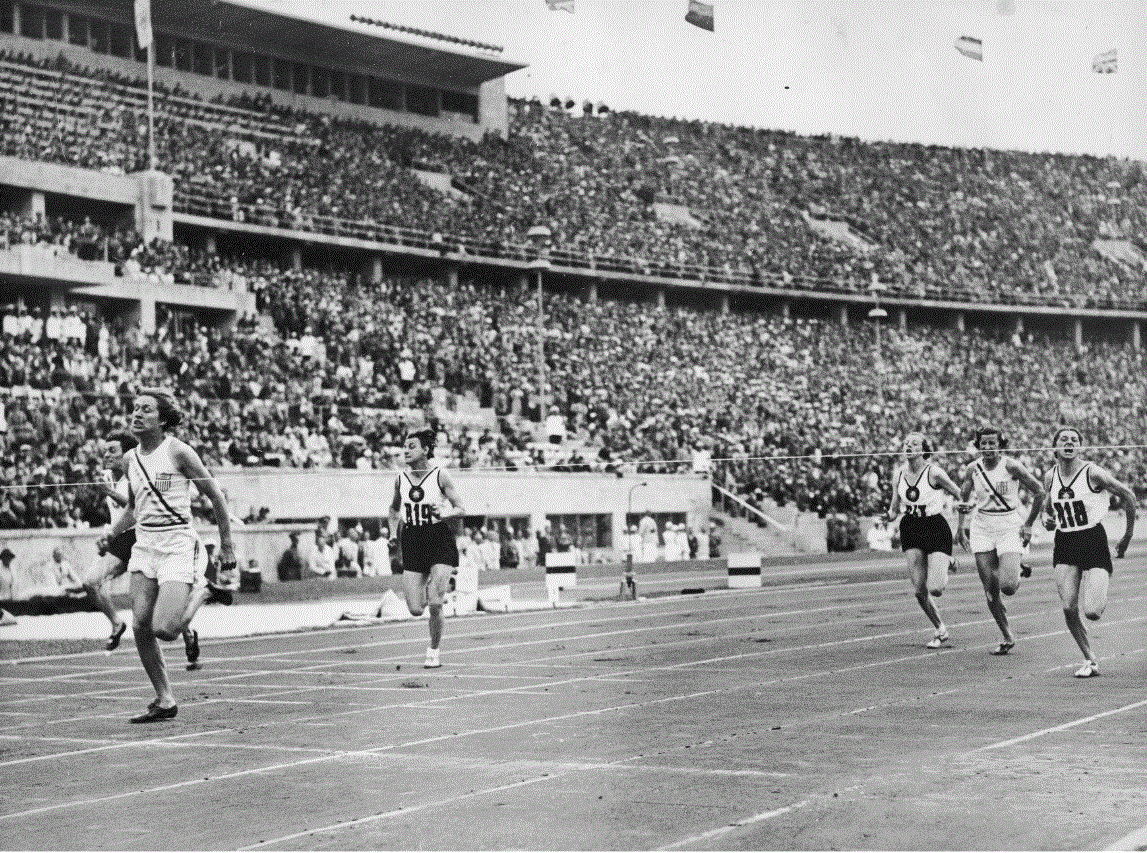
Image from the final of the women's 100 m

The women's 100 metres sprint event at the 1936 Olympic Games took place on 3 and 4 August. The final was won by American Helen Stephens. Some Eastern European (especially Polish) journalists suggested she might be a man. Besides Stephens, the silver medalist, Stanisława Walasiewicz, had also faced accusations of being a male imposter. The International Olympic Committee performed a physical check on Stephens and concluded that she was a woman.

== Results ==
=== Heats ===
==== Heat 1 ====
Rank	Athlete	Nation	Time (hand)	Notes
1	Emmy Albus	Germany	12.4	Q
2	Johanna Vancura	Austria	12.5	Q
3	Hilda Cameron	Canada	12.7	
4	Harriet Bland	United States	Unknown	
5	Raili Halttu	Finland	Unknown	

==== Heat 2 ====
Rank	Athlete	Nation	Time (hand)	Notes
1	Helen Stephens	United States	11.4	Q
2	Jeanette Dolson	Canada	12.3	Q
3	Grete Neumann	Austria	12.9	
4	Etsuko Komiya	Japan	13.1	
5	Flora Hofman	Yugoslavia	Unknown	

==== Heat 3 ====
Rank	Athlete	Nation	Time (hand)	Notes
1	Stanisława Walasiewicz	Poland	12.5	Q
2	Rauni Essman	Finland	12.8	Q
3	Elisabeth Koning	Netherlands	12.9	
4	Marguerite Perrou	France	12.3	
5	Li Sen	Republic of China	Unknown	

==== Heat 4 ====
Rank	Athlete	Nation	Time (hand)	Notes
1	Eileen Hiscock	Great Britain	12.6	Q
2	Annette Rogers	United States	12.8	Q
3	Alida de Vries	Netherlands	13.0	
4	Charlotte Machmer	Austria	Unknown	
5	Ebba From	Finland	Unknown	

==== Heat 5 ====
Rank	Athlete	Nation	Time (hand)	Notes
1	Käthe Krauß	Germany	12.1	Q
2	Aileen Meagher	Canada	12.4	Q
3	Audrey Brown	Great Britain	12.6	
4	Vera Romanić	Yugoslavia	Unknown	
5	Claudia Testoni	Italy	Unknown	

==== Heat 6 ====
Rank	Athlete	Nation	Time (hand)	Notes
1	Marie Dollinger	Germany	12.0	Q
2	Barbara Burke	Great Britain	12.4	Q
3	Domnitsa Lanitou-Kavounidou	Greece	12.8	
4	Yvonne Mabille	France	Unknown	
5	Raquel Martínez	Chile	Unknown	

=== Semifinals ===
==== Semifinal 1 ====
Rank	Athlete	Nation	Time (hand)	Notes
1	Helen Stephens	United States	11.5	Q
2	Käthe Krauß	Germany	11.9	Q
3	Emmy Albus	Germany	12.2	Q
4	Eileen Hiscock	Great Britain	Unknown	
5	Aileen Meagher	Canada	Unknown	
6	Johanna Vancura	Austria	Unknown	

==== Semifinal 2 ====
Rank	Athlete	Nation	Time (hand)	Notes
1	Marie Dollinger	Germany	12.0	Q
2	Stanisława Walasiewicz	Poland	12.0	Q
3	Annette Rogers	United States	12.1	Q
4	Barbara Burke	Great Britain	12.2	
5	Jeanette Dolson	Canada	Unknown	
6	Rauni Essman	Finland	Unknown	

=== Final ===
Rank	Athlete	Nation	Time
1st place, gold medalist(s)	Helen Stephens	United States	11.5
2nd place, silver medalist(s)	Stanisława Walasiewicz	Poland	11.7
3rd place, bronze medalist(s)	Käthe Krauß	Germany	11.9
4	Marie Dollinger	Germany	12.0
5	Annette Rogers	United States	12.2
6	Emmy Albus	Germany	12.3
