= Komiya =

Komiya (written: 小宮) is a Japanese surname. Notable people with the surname include:

- Arisa Komiya (小宮 有紗, born 1994), Japanese actress and voice actress
- Etsuko Komiya (小宮 悦子, born 1919), Japanese sprinter
- Kazue Komiya (小宮 和枝, born 1952), Japanese voice actress
- Masae Komiya (born 1975), Japanese goalball player
- Rio Komiya (小宮 璃央, born 2002), Japanese voice actress
- Yuichiro Komiya (小宮 雄一郎, born 1992), Japanese volleyball player

== Fictional characters ==
- Chihiro Komiya (小宮 千尋), protagonist of the manga series Shōnen Maid
- Ena Komiya (小宮 恵那), a character in the anime series Just Because!
- Komiya (小宮), a character in the anime series Aggretsuko
- Nonoka Komiya (古宮 乃々香), protagonist of the anime series Celestial Method
- Yuzu Komiya (古宮 柚子), a character in the manga series Nekogami Yaoyorozu

== See also ==
- Komiya Station, a railway station in Hachiōji, Tokyo, Japan
