= Sporting Gender =

2013 non-fiction book by Yunxiang Gao

Sporting Gender: Women Athletes and Celebrity-Making during China’s National Crisis, 1931 – 45
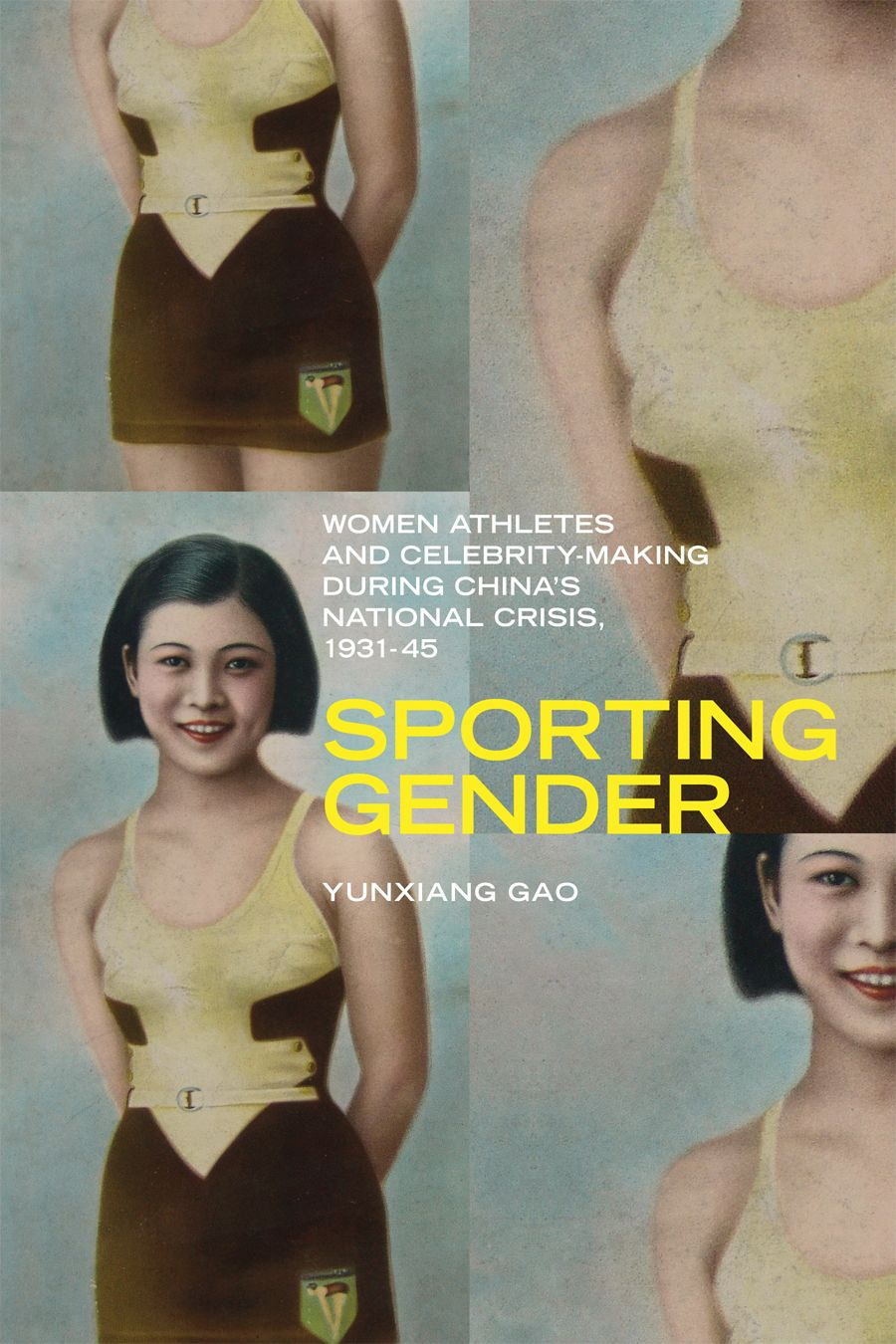
- Author: Yunxiang Gao
- Publisher: University of British Columbia Press
- Publication date: 2013
- ISBN: 978-0-774-82482-8

Sporting Gender: Women Athletes and Celebrity-Making during China’s National Crisis, 1931 – 45 is a non-fiction book by Yunxiang Gao. Published in 2013 by the University of British Columbia Press, it discusses the history of female athletes during the Japanese invasion of China. It in particular discusses the life and careers of sports educator Zhang Huilan, school principal Lu Lihua, athletes Sun Guiyun, Qian Xingsu, Li Sen, and Yang Xiuqiong, and the Private Liangjiang Women's Tiyu Normal School and the 1930s women's magazine Ling Long.

== General references ==
- Blishen, A. O. (2015-01-02). "Yunxiang Gao. Sporting Gender: Woman Athletes and Celebrity-Making during China's National Crisis 1931 – 45". Asian Affairs. 46 (1): 180–181. doi:10.1080/03068374.2015.999207. ISSN 0306-8374.
- Chong, Gladys Pak Lei (2015-03-24). "Sporting Gender: Women Athletes and Celebrity-Making during China's National Crisis, 1931 – 45. written by Yunxiang Gao, 2013". Nan Nü. 17 (2): 356–359. doi:10.1163/15685268-00172p16. ISSN 1387-6805.
- Li, Danke (October 2015). "Yunxiang Gao. Sporting Gender: Women Athletes and Celebrity-Making during China's National Crisis, 1931–45 ". The American Historical Review. 120 (4): 1466–1467. doi:10.1093/ahr/120.4.1466. ISSN 0002-8762.
- Xiao, Hui Faye (2015). "Sporting Gender: Women Athletes and Celebrity-Making during China's National Crisis, 1931–45 by Yunxiang Gao (review)". University of Toronto Quarterly. 84 (3): 305–306. ISSN 1712-5278.
