= Barbara Howard (athlete) =

Canadian sprinter (1920–2017)

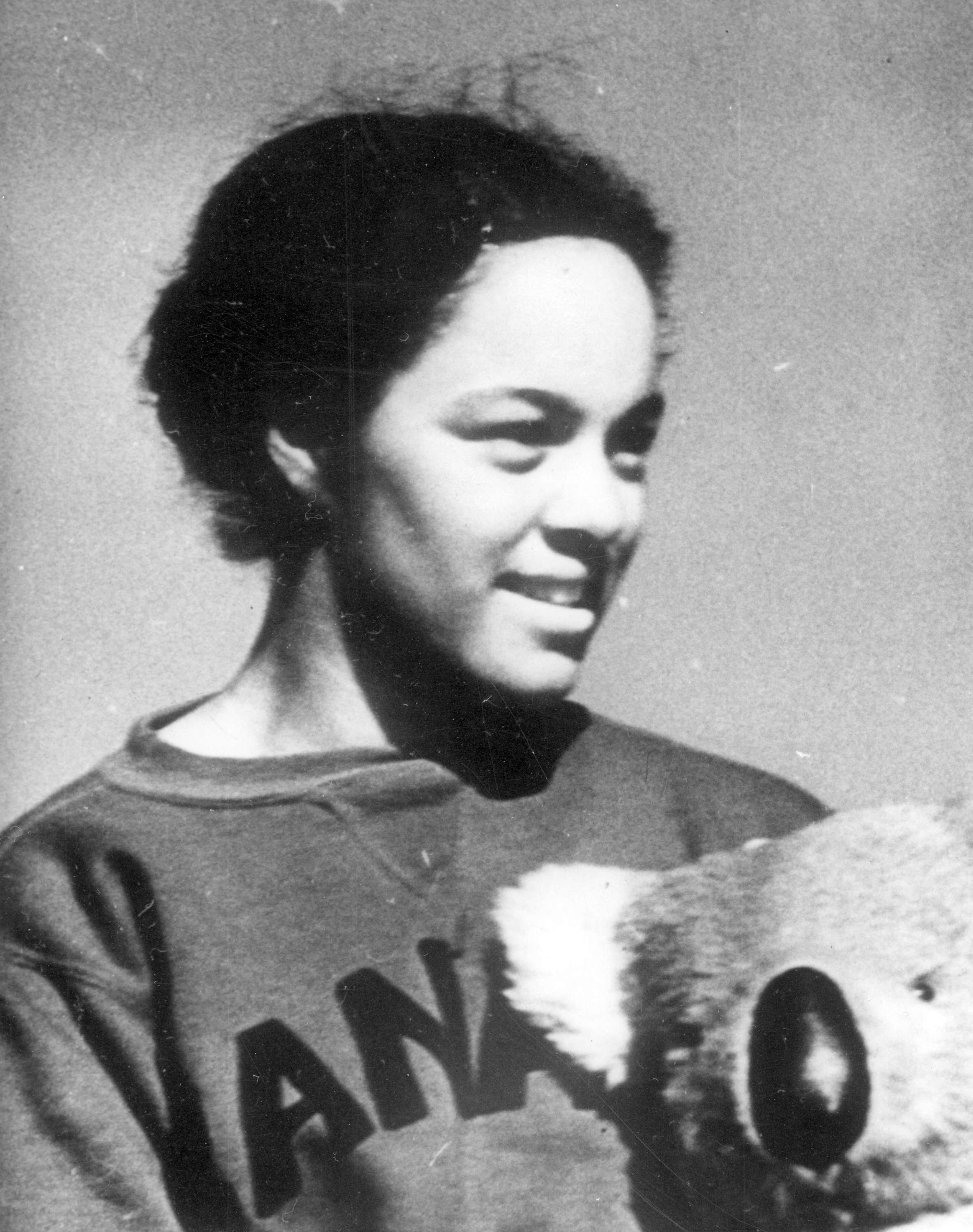
- Barbara Howard at the British Empire Games (1938)

Personal information
- Nationality: Canadian
- Born: May 8, 1920 Vancouver, British Columbia
- Died: January 26, 2017 (aged 96)
- Education: B.Ed, University of British Columbia
- Occupation: Teacher

Sport
- Sport: Sprinter
Medal record
Women's athletics
Representing Canada
British Empire Games
| Silver medal – second place | 1938 Sydney | 3×110/220 yd |
| Bronze medal – third place | 1938 Sydney | 4×110/220 yd |

Barbara Howard (May 8, 1920 – January 26, 2017) was a Canadian sprinter and educator. Growing up in Vancouver, British Columbia, Howard gained national media attention as a sprinter in high school when she completed a time trial that broke the standing British Empire Games record for the 100-yard dash. She was selected as a member of the Canadian track and field team for the 1938 British Empire Games, becoming the first Black woman to represent Canada in international athletic competition. Although she did not place in the 100-yard dash, she helped her team win silver and bronze in the 440-yard and 660-yard relay events. The outbreak of the Second World War meant that most international sporting events over the next decade were cancelled, and Howard's window of opportunity as a sprinter ended before she could compete again.

After high school, Howard completed Normal School training and a Bachelor of Education degree, teaching at elementary schools for more than 40 years. She was the first member of a visible minority to be hired by the Vancouver School Board.

Howard is an inductee of the Burnaby Sports Hall of Fame (2011), the BC Sports Hall of Fame (2012), and the Canadian Sports Hall of Fame (2015).

== Early life ==
Barbara Howard was born on May 8, 1920, in Vancouver, British Columbia. She had four older siblings – a brother and three sisters – and her parents were dressmaker Catherine "Cassie" Scurry and American-born stationary engineer Samuel Howard. According to family lore, Scurry's father had owned one of the earliest barbershops in the City of Vancouver, the Abbott Street Shaving Parlour and Baths, and during the Great Vancouver Fire of 1886 he had escaped the flames by taking his barber chair and running to the nearby harbour waters.

The family lived in East Vancouver's Grandview neighbourhood. When Howard was eight years old, her father died, and her maternal uncle stepped in to support the family.

== Sprinting ==
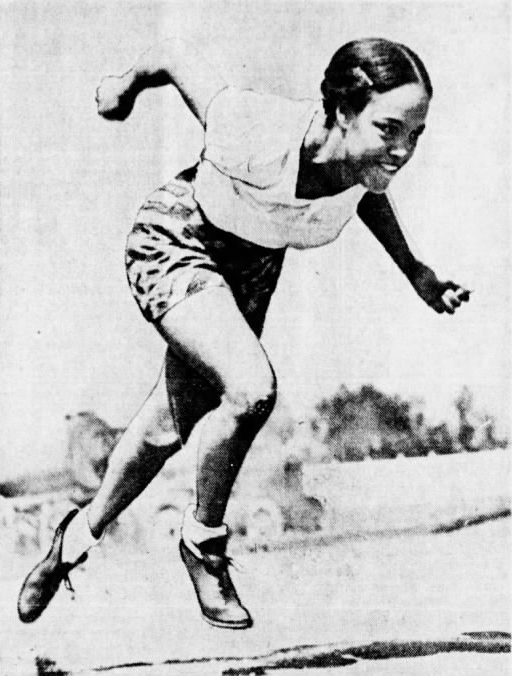
Barbara Howard (1937)

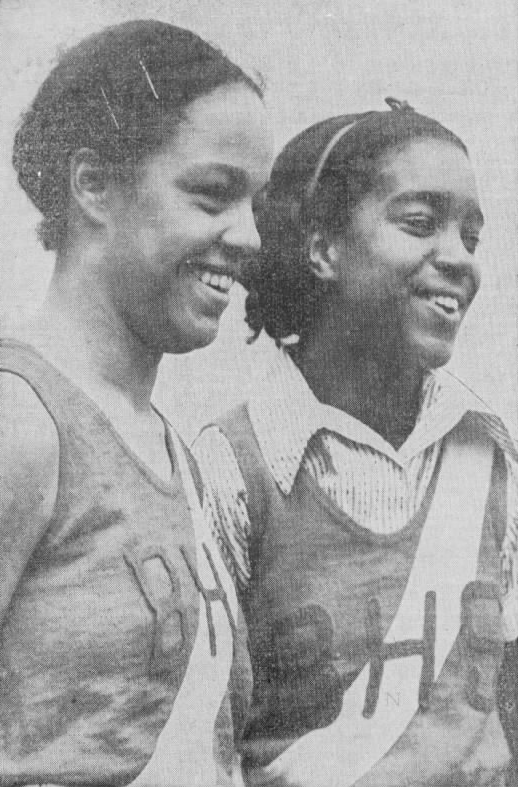
Howard (left) and a fellow Britannia High runner at a high school meet (1937)

Howard's sprinting abilities were first noticed during her elementary school years, when she often ran the final blocks between her house and the school to reach the classroom in time. She became the school running champion for Laura Secord Elementary, and at Britannia High she was known as one of the fastest sprinters in Vancouver. In September 1937, she gained national media attention when she completed a time trial and achieved a running time of 100 yards in only 11.2 seconds – exceeding the standing British Empire Games' record by one tenth of a second. Howard, only 17 years old, subsequently received a spot on the Canadian women's track and field team for the 1938 British Empire Games. She is believed to be the first Black woman to represent Canada in international athletic competition.

Travelling to Sydney, Australia for the Games, Howard and her teammates completed a 28-day journey aboard the ocean liner Aorangi. It was the first time Howard had left Vancouver. They arrived at Sydney in mid-January 1938, and over the next few weeks Howard found herself showered with attention from Australian media and sports fans, who were both taken by her personality and fascinated by the "novelty" of meeting a Black athlete. The Australian Women's Weekly called her the "most popular girl in the Canadian team". Howard enjoyed her time there and was the recipient of many gifts, including a koala bear toy. However, the immense pressure of the Games, combined with a diet of unfamiliar Australian foods, meant that Howard struggled to perform her best during the 100-yard dash, and she finished in sixth place behind Australian sprinter Decima Norman. Howard was disappointed with her result, but she helped Canada's 440-yard and 660-yard relay teams win silver and bronze medals respectively, running with teammates Jeanette Dolson, Aileen Meagher and Violet Montgomery.

Although Howard intended to continue in her international track career, the outbreak of the Second World War meant that the Olympics in both 1940 and 1944 were cancelled, and her window of opportunity as a sprinter passed.

== Teaching career ==
After high school, Howard completed training as a teacher at Normal School, and was hired for her first teaching position at Port Alberni soon after graduation. Returning to Vancouver in 1941, she became the first member of a visible minority to be hired by the Vancouver School Board, where she went on to teach for 43 years across multiple elementary schools. She was a member of the Delta Kappa Gamma sorority and volunteered with Canadian Girls in Training. In 1959, Howard graduated from the University of British Columbia with a Bachelor of Education degree.

According to the later recollections of Howard's former students, her dedication and inventive curriculum made a lasting impression. When asked to teach a class of "brilliant, but underperforming kids," she devised lessons that included having students plan field trips, shadow working professionals, and create their own films. She didn't often speak about her past as a sprinter, but her students from the early 1970s recalled one memorable occasion:

Physical fitness was a priority and softball was our daily game. We hadn't known her impressive sports background, until the day she suggested boys versus girls, with her as captain and she ran round the bases in skirt and heels, laughing her head off as she hit the winning home run for the girls team!

Howard retired from teaching in 1984, but remained active as a volunteer through the United Church. At her local community centre, she led exercise classes and peer counselling courses. In 2010, the Vancouver Park Board gave Howard a Remarkable Woman Award in recognition of "her passionate dedication to inspire others to make a positive difference in their community."

== Death and legacy ==
In the last decade of Howard's life, research into Canadian sports history had triggered new public interest in her story, and her athletic achievements were recognized by an induction into the Burnaby Sports Hall of Fame (2011), the BC Sports Hall of Fame (2012), and the Canadian Sports Hall of Fame (2015). In 2018, the City of Vancouver announced that it would rename a park near the Cambie Street Bridge as Barbara Howard Plaza.

Howard died on January 26, 2017.
