= Vančura =

Vančura (feminine Vančurová) is an old aristocratic Czech surname. Notable people include:

- Antonín Vančura (1882–1939), real name of Czech writer Jiří Mahen
- Dušan Vančura (1969–2020), Czech singer
- Johanna Vancura (1915–1998), Austrian sprinter
- Marta Vančurová (born 1948), Czech actress
- Tomáš Vančura (born 1996), Czech ski jumper
- Věra Vančurová (1932–2018), Czech gymnast
- Vladislav Vančura (1891–1942), Czech writer

It may also refer to:

- The Vančura position in chess.
