= Halttu =

Halttu is a Finnish surname. Notable people with the surname include:

- Kristiina Halttu (born 1963), Finnish actress
- Paavo Halttu (1914–1976), Finnish general
- Raili Halttu (1909–2006), Finnish sprinter
