= Harriet Bland =

American sprinter (1915–1991)

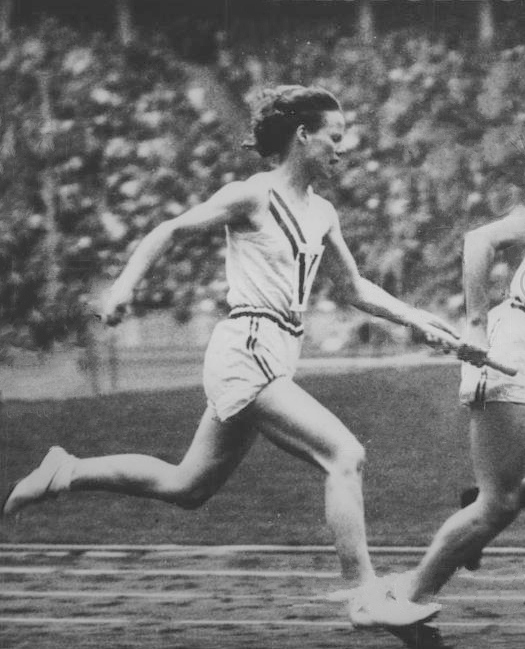
- Bland at the 1936 Olympics

Personal information
- Full name: Harriet Claiborne Bland
- Born: February 13, 1915 St. Louis, Missouri, U.S.
- Died: November 6, 1991 (aged 76) Fort Worth, Texas, U.S.
- Education: Washington University in St. Louis
- Height: 5 ft 4 in (1.63 m)
- Weight: 110 lb (50 kg)

Sport
- Country: United States
- Sport: Athletics
- Event: Sprint
- Club: St. Louis Athletic Club

Achievements and titles
- Personal best: 100 m – 12.2 (1932)
Medal record
Women's athletics
Representing the United States
Olympic Games
Gold medal – first place	1936 Berlin	4 × 100 m relay

Harriet Claiborne Bland (February 13, 1915 – November 6, 1991), later Harriet Bland Green, was an American sprinter from St. Louis, Missouri.

== Early life ==
Bland was born in St. Louis, the daughter of Isabelle Heard Bland. She attended Mary Institute, a private day school.

== Sports career ==
Bland nearly qualified for the 1932 Summer Olympics team in 1932, and protested the decision to exclude her. She qualified for the 1936 team, but was told that there was no money to send her to Berlin. After a fundraising campaign by the St. Louis Globe-Democrat, to cover her travel expenses, and losing her track shoes and handbag in New York before sailing for Berlin, she competed at the 1936 Summer Olympics, under track coach Dee Boeckmann, in the individual 100 m and 4 × 100 m relay. She won a gold medal in the relay, with Betty Robinson, Annette Rogers, and Helen Stephens.

Bland was honored upon her return, alongside other American Olympians, at a parade in New York City. She served on the Ozark A. A. U. Women's Track and Field Committee, and coached a track program for girls in St. Louis, after her Olympic win. She was head finish judge at an invitational relay for women in Edwardsville, Illinois in 1965. she later earned a bachelor's degree in interior design at the Sam Fox School of Design & Visual Arts at Washington University in St. Louis.

== Later life ==
Harriet Bland married professional golfer William W. Green in 1939. They had a son, William C. Green, who subsequently had five sons, including Marshall Heard Bland Green of Wellsville, New York. She survived a stroke in 1974 and used a wheelchair after that. She was inducted into the Missouri Sports Hall of Fame in 1983. She died from a heart attack at her son's home in Fort Worth, Texas, in 1991, aged 76 years.
