= Margaret McDowall (sprinter) =

British sprinter (1920–1987)

Personal information
- Nationality: British
- Born: Margaret Morie McDowall; 1920 Ayrshire, Scotland
- Died: 1987 (aged 66–67) Kingston-upon-Hull, England

Sport
- Sport: Athletics
- Event: Sprints
- Club: Ardeer & Kilmarnock Harriers

Margaret Morie McDowall (1920–1987) was a British sprinter who competed at the 1938 Empire Games (now Commonwealth Games). She was Scotland's sole female athletics competitor and only one of two Scottish women at the Games.

== Biography ==
Margaret Morie McDowall was born in Ayrshire, Scotland in 1920. Known as Peggy in he younger years, she was educated at Auchenharvie Academy and trained by Mr Agnew and made her athletic debut on 4 July 1935 and within the first year of competition won the Ardeer Sports meeting, Maryhill Sports meeting and Rothesay Highland Games and was described as an athletic prodigy.

McDowall ran for the Ardeer & Kilmarnock Harriers.

She became the Scottish 100 yards champion at the Scottish Athletics Championships and in August 1937 she set a Scottish record over 100 yards recording 11.1 sec, which led to selection for the 1938 British Empire Games in Sydney, Australia.

McDowall duly represented Scotland at the 1938 British Empire Games in the 100 yards and 220 yards, reaching the semi-final of the latter. At the time of the 1938 Games she was still in full-time education and lived at 5 Sandhills in Stevenston, North Ayrshire.

After the Games she continued to race until the outbreak of World War II, taking part in a meeting on 27 May 1939, being given a half yard handicap ahead of Lily Hunter, who had usurped her Scottish title.

McDowall married Stewart Wilson Third in Scotland in 1944. She died in Kingston-upon-Hull, England in 1987.
