= Ebba From =

Finnish sprinter

Ebba Ingegerd From Svahn (23 October 1915, Helsinki – 25 November 2006, Helsinki) was a Finnish track athlete. She was one of the first four female Finnish Olympic athletes in athletics.

From qualified for the 1936 Olympic Games in Berlin in the 100 meter and 4 × 100 meter relay events.

== Sources ==
- Evans, Hilary; Gjerde, Arild; Heijmans, Jeroen; Mallon, Bill; et al. "Ebba From". Olympics at Sports-Reference.com. Sports Reference LLC. Archived from the original on 2016-12-03.
