= Hilda Cameron =

Canadian sprinter (1912–2001)

Olympic medal record

Women's athletics Competitor for Canada
| Bronze medal – third place | 1936 Berlin | 4x100 metre relay |

Hilda May Cameron (later Young, August 14, 1912 – April 24, 2001) was a Canadian athlete who competed mainly in the 100 metres. She was born and died in Toronto.

Cameron competed for Canada in the 1936 Summer Olympics held in Berlin, Germany in the 4 x 100 metres where she won the bronze medal with her teammates Dorothy Brookshaw, Mildred Dolson and Aileen Meagher. In the 100 metre event she was eliminated in the first round. At the 1934 British Empire Games she finished fifth in the 220 yards competition.
