= Dorothy Brookshaw =

Canadian sprinter

Personal information
- Full name: Dorothy Elizabeth Anne Brookshaw
- Born: December 20, 1912 Toronto, Ontario, Canada
- Died: September 10, 1962 (aged 49) Orillia, Ontario, Canada
Medal record
Women's athletics
Representing Canada
Olympic Games
Bronze medal – third place	1936 Berlin	4x100 metre relay

Dorothy Elizabeth Anne "Dot" Brookshaw (December 20, 1912 – September 10, 1962) was a Canadian athlete who competed mainly in the 100 metres.

She competed for Canada in the 1936 Summer Olympics held in Berlin, Germany in the 4 x 100 metres where she won the bronze medal with her teammates Mildred Dolson, Hilda Cameron and Aileen Meagher.
