= Flora Hofman =

Yugoslav athlete

Personal information
- Nationality: Yugoslav
- Born: 17 November 1911 Sarajevo, Condominium of Bosnia and Herzegovina, Austria-Hungary

Sport
- Sport: Sprinting
- Event: 100 metres

Flora Hofman (born 17 November 1911, date of death unknown) was a Yugoslav sprinter. She competed in the women's 100 metres at the 1936 Summer Olympics.
