= Yvonne Mabille =

French sprinter

Personal information
- Nationality: French
- Born: 4 August 1913

Sport
- Sport: Sprinting
- Event: 100 metres
- Club: Fémina Sport

Achievements and titles
- Personal bests: 100 – 12.8 (1935); 80H – 12.8 (1935)

Yvonne Mabille (born 4 August 1913, date of death unknown) was a French sprinter. She competed in the women's 100 metres at the 1936 Summer Olympics.
