= Marguerite Perrou =

French sprinter

Personal information
- Nationality: French
- Born: 21 October 1916
- Died: 5 February 2013 (aged 96)

Sport
- Sport: Sprinting
- Event: 100 metres

Marguerite Perrou (21 October 1916 – 5 February 2013) was a French sprinter. She competed in the women's 100 metres at the 1936 Summer Olympics.
