= Vera Romanić =

Yugoslav sprinter

Personal information
- Nationality: Yugoslav
- Born: 13 April 1911 Graz, Austria-Hungary
- Died: 21 August 1993 (aged 82)

Sport
- Sport: Sprinting
- Event: 100 metres

Vera Romanić (13 April 1911 – 21 August 1993) was a Yugoslav sprinter. She competed in the women's 100 metres at the 1936 Summer Olympics.
