= Alida de Vries =

Dutch sprinter

Alida de Vries (Alida Elisabeth Christina "Ali" De Vries, married name Gerritsen; 9 August 1914 – 20 January 2007) was a Dutch athlete, who finished in fifth position at the 1936 Summer Olympics in the 4 × 100 m relay event alongside Kitty ter Braake, Fanny Blankers-Koen and Elisabeth Koning. She was born in Den Helder. She died at the age of 92 in her hometown Amsterdam.
