= Fernanda Bullano =

Italian sprinter

Personal information
- Nationality: Italian
- Born: 26 September 1914 Turin, Italy
- Died: 16 November 2003 (aged 89) Venaria Reale, Italy

Sport
- Country: Italy
- Sport: Athletics
- Event: Sprint
- Club: Venchi Unica Torino

Achievements and titles
- Personal best: 100 m: 12.8 (1935)

Fernanda Bullano (married name Dobile; 26 September 1914 – 16 November 2003) was an Italian sprinter. She was born in Turin and died in Venaria Reale.

== Achievements ==
Year	Competition	Venue	Position	Event	Performance	Note
1936	Olympic Games	(Germany) Berlin	4th	4 × 100 m relay	48.7	

== National titles ==
Fernanda Bullano has won three times the individual national championship.

- 2 wins in 100 metres (1934, 1935)
- 1 win in 200 metres (1937)

== See also ==
- Italy national relay team
