= Helen Stephens =

American athlete (1918–1994)

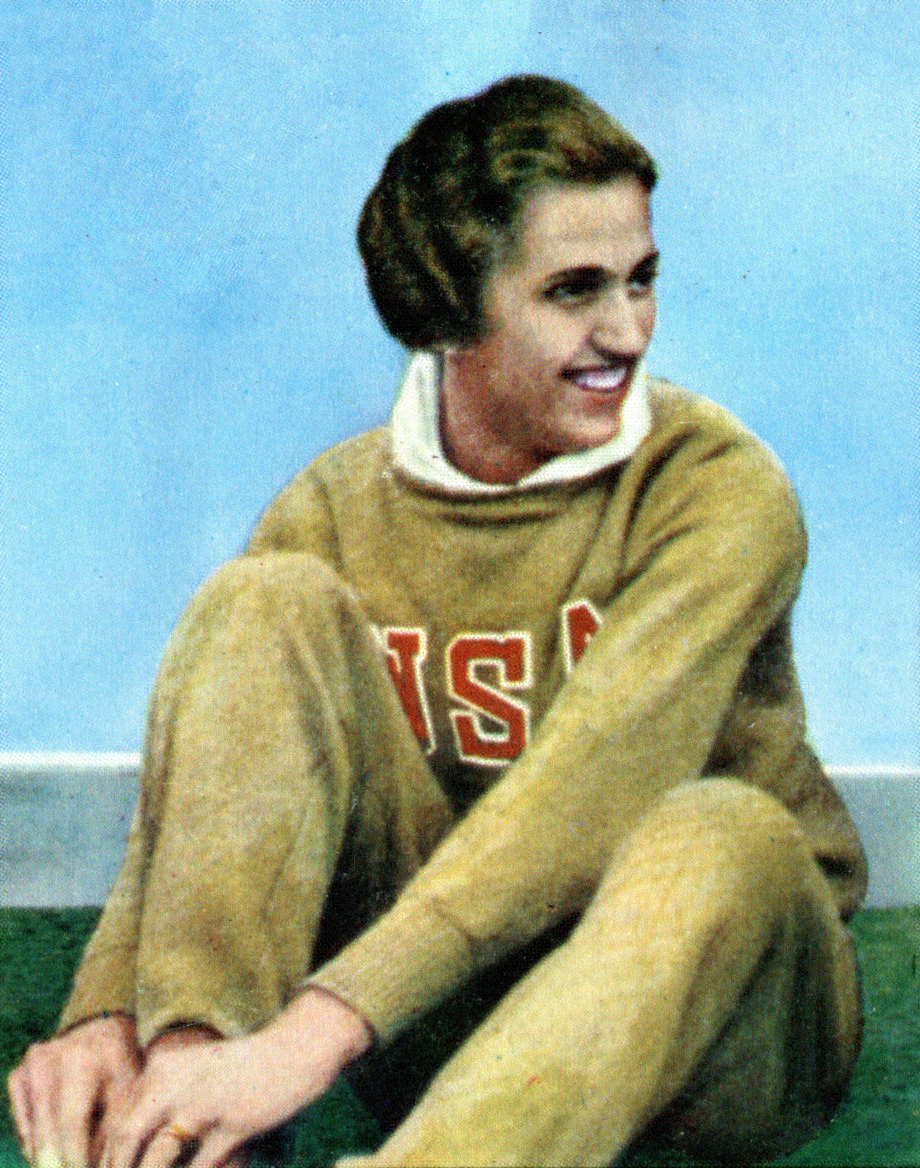
- Stephens in 1936

Personal information
- Full name: Helen Herring Stephens
- Nickname: The Fulton Flash
- Born: February 3, 1918 Fulton, Missouri, U.S.
- Died: January 17, 1994 (aged 75) St. Louis, Missouri, U.S.
- Height: 5 ft 11 1/2 in (182 cm)
- Weight: 154 lb (70 kg)

Sport
- Sport: Athletics
- Events: 100 m, 200 m, shot put, discus throw

Achievements and titles
- Personal bests: 100 yd – 10.4 (1935); 100 m – 11.5 (1936); 200 m – 24.1 (1936) shot put − 13.70 m (1937) discus – 39.50 m (1936)
Medal record
Representing the United States
Olympic Games
Gold medal – first place	1936 Berlin	100 m
Gold medal – first place	1936 Berlin	4 × 100 m relay

Helen Herring Stephens (February 3, 1918 – January 17, 1994) was an American athlete and a double Olympic champion in 1936.

== Biography ==
Stephens, nicknamed the "Fulton Flash" after her birthplace, Fulton, Missouri, was a strong athlete in sprint events—she never lost a race in her entire career—and also in weight events such as the shot put and discus throw. She won national titles in both categories.

When she was 18, Stephens participated in the 1936 Summer Olympics. There she won the 100 m final, beating reigning champion and world record holder, Stanisława Walasiewicz (aka Stella Walsh) of Poland. Stephen's time of 11.5 s was below the world record, but was not recognized because a strong tailwind was blowing at the time of the race. Next, Stephens anchored the American 4 × 100 m relay team that won the Olympic title after the leading German team dropped its baton.

Stephens is quoted by Olympic historian, David Wallechinsky, about her post-race experience with Adolf Hitler. "He comes in and gives me the Nazi salute. I gave him a good, old-fashioned Missouri handshake," she said. "Once more Hitler goes for the jugular vein. He gets hold of my fanny and begins to squeeze and pinch, and hug me up. And he said: 'You're a true Aryan type. You should be running for Germany.' So after he gave me the once over and a full massage, he asked me if I'd like to spend the weekend in Berchtesgaden." Stephens refused.

Stephens retired from athletics shortly after the games and played professional baseball and softball. She attended William Woods University, Fulton High School, and Middle River School in Fulton. She was later inducted into the William Woods Owls Hall of Fame, described as "the most well-known athlete in Fulton’s history." From 1938 to 1952, she was the owner and manager of her own semi-professional basketball team; she was the first woman to own and manage a semi-professional basketball team. She was employed for many years in the Research Division of the U.S. Aeronautical Chart and Information Service (later, a part of the Defense Mapping Agency) in St. Louis, Missouri.

Her longtime partner was Mabel O. Robbe (née Wires), a dietician at Francis Shimer College.

In 1993, she was inducted into the National Women's Hall of Fame.

She died in Saint Louis at age 75.

== 1936 Olympic gender controversy ==
At the 1936 Olympics, it was suggested that both Stephens and Stanisława Walasiewicz were, in fact, male. Stephens received scrutiny over her gender after her 100 m victory, with the Warsaw-based newspaper Kurier Poranny writing, "It is scandalous that the Americans entered a man in the women's competition." Other newspapers soon also reported on Stephens alleged lack of femininity. Stephens later told her biographer that she told reporters who questioned her about her gender "to check the facts with the Olympic committee physician who sex-tested all athletes prior to competition."

Newspapers soon reported that German officials had given Stephens a so-called sex test and let her compete only after they had confirmed she was a woman. The Harrisburg Telegraph reported that International Olympic Committee performed a physical check on Stephens and concluded that she was a woman. These reports were denied by IOC committee member Avery Brundage and no further evidence surfaced. In 1938, Paul Gallico in his book Farewell to Sport suggested that American sports officials had examined Stephens prior to the Olympic games. On August 28, following the Olympics but before returning to New York, Stephens wrote in her diary that she was inspected by American officials. Walasiewicz in fact had been born intersex, a fact not made public until after her death in 1980.

== Bibliography ==
- The Life of Helen Stephens – The Fulton Flash, by Sharon Kinney Hanson, 2004.
