= Li Sen =

Chinese sprinter (1914–1942)

Personal information
- Nationality: Chinese
- Born: 25 April 1914
- Died: 1942 (aged 27–28)

Sport
- Sport: Sprinting
- Event: 100 metres

Li Sen (25 April 1914 – 1942) was a Chinese sprinter. She competed in the women's 100 metres at the 1936 Summer Olympics. She was the first woman to represent China at the Olympics.
