= Rauni Essman =

Finnish sprinter

Personal information
- Nationality: Finnish
- Born: Rauni Mirjam Asteljoki; 8 April 1918 Joensuu
- Died: 21 May 1999 (aged 81) Kouvola

Sport
- Sport: Sprinting
- Event: 100 metres

Rauni Essman (8 April 1918 – 21 May 1999) was a Finnish track and field athlete, best known for her sprinting. She competed in the women's 100 metres at the 1936 Summer Olympics.
