= Etsuko Komiya =

Japanese sprinter

Personal information
- Nationality: Japanese
- Born: 27 October 1919 Yahata, Fukuoka, Japan
- Died: 7 October 2014 (aged 94)

Sport
- Sport: Sprinting
- Event: 100 metres

Etsuko Komiya (小宮 悦子, Komiya Etsuko; 27 October 1919 – 7 October 2014) was a Japanese sprinter. She competed in the women's 100 metres at the 1936 Summer Olympics. She later became a middle school gym teacher in Omuta, Fukuoka.
