= Kitty ter Braake =

Dutch sprinter

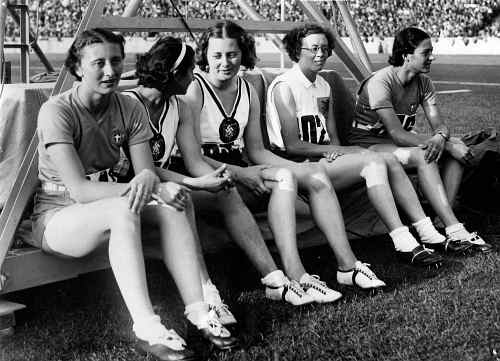
- Kitty ter Braake (2nd from right) at the 1936 Olympics

Personal information
- Full name: Catharina Elizabeth ter Braake
- Nationality: Dutch
- Born: 19 December 1913
- Died: 20 June 1991 (aged 77)

Sport
- Sport: Sprinting
- Event: 4 × 100 metres relay
Medal record
Women's athletics
Representing Netherlands
European Championships
Bronze medal – third place	1938 Vienna	80 m hurdles

Catharina Elizabeth "Kitty" ter Braake (19 December 1913 – 20 June 1991) was a Dutch sprinter. She competed in the women's 4 × 100 metres relay at the 1936 Summer Olympics.
