= Raili Halttu =

Finnish sprinter

Personal information
- Nationality: Finnish
- Born: 13 July 1909
- Died: 3 December 2006 (aged 97)

Sport
- Sport: Sprinting
- Event: 100 metres

Raili Halttu (13 July 1909 – 3 December 2006) was a Finnish sprinter. She competed in the women's 100 metres at the 1936 Summer Olympics.
