= Elisabeth Koning =

Dutch sprinter

Personal information
- Nationality: Dutch
- Born: 7 November 1917 Zandvoort, Netherlands
- Died: 12 February 1975 (aged 57) Calgary, Alberta, Canada

Sport
- Sport: Sprinting
- Event: 100 metres

Elisabeth Koning (Elisabeth Goverdina "Lies" Koning, married name van der Stam; 7 November 1917 – 12 February 1975) was a Dutch sprinter. She competed in the women's 100 metres at the 1936 Summer Olympics.
