= Joan Woodland =

Australian sprinter

Medal record

Women's athletics

Representing Australia

British Empire Games
Gold medal – first place	1938 Sydney	4×110/220 yd

Joan May Woodland (8 May 1921 – 13 November 2013) was an Australian track and field athlete who competed in the 1938 British Empire Games. Woodland was born in Nottingham, England in May 1921. During World War II, Woodland served in the Australian armed forces. She was a member of the Australian team in the 1938 Empire Games, which won the gold medal in the 220-110-220-110 yards relay competition. In the 100 yards competition she finished fifth. She died in November 2013 at the age of 92.
