= Johanna Vancura =

Austrian sprinter 1915–1996

Personal information
- Nationality: Austrian
- Born: 20 July 1915 Vienna, Austria-Hungary
- Died: 26 September 1998 (aged 83) Vienna, Austria

Sport
- Sport: Sprinting
- Event: 100 metres

Johanna Vancura (20 July 1915 – 26 September 1998) was an Austrian sprinter. She competed in the women's 100 metres at the 1936 Summer Olympics.
