= Jean Coleman (athlete) =

Australian sprinter

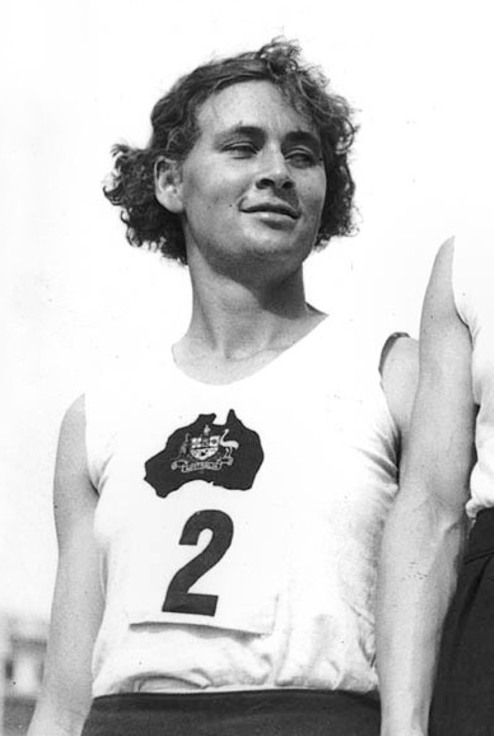
- Coleman at the 1938 British Empire Games

Personal information
- Born: 9 November 1918 Boggabri, Australia
- Died: 13 December 2008 (aged 90)

Sport
- Sport: Athletics
- Event: Sprint

Achievements and titles
- Personal best: 200 m – 24.9 (1940)
Medal record
Representing Australia
British Empire Games
Gold medal – first place	1938 Sydney	3×110/220 yd
Gold medal – first place	1938 Sydney	4×110/220 yd
Silver medal – second place	1938 Sydney	220 yards

Jean Victory Coleman (9 November 1918 – 13 December 2008) was an Australian sprinter. At the 1938 British Empire Games she won an individual silver medal in the 220 yards and two gold medals with Australian relay teams.
