= Kathleen Stokes =

British athlete

Personal information
- Nationality: British (English)
- Born: 14 September 1916 England
- Died: 2 February 2003 (aged 86) England

Sport
- Sport: Athletics
- Event: Sprints
- Club: London Olympiades AC
Medal record
Women's Athletics
Representing England
British Empire Games
Silver medal – second place	1938 Sydney	4×110/220 yd
Bronze medal – third place	1938 Sydney	3×110/220 yd

Kathleen Susan "Kate" Stokes (later Earwaker; 14 September 1916 – 2 February 2003) was an English athlete who competed in the 1938 British Empire Games.

== Biography ==
Stokes finished third behind Audrey Wade and Eileen Hiscock in the 60 metres and 200 metres events respectively at the 1935 WAAA Championships and finished second again in the 200 metres at the 1937 WAAA Championships.

At the 1938 Empire Games she was a member of the England relay team which won the silver medal in the 220-110-220-110 yards event and the bronze medal in the 110-220-110 yards competition. In the 100 yards contest as well as in the 220 yards event she was eliminated in the semi-finals.
