= Aileen Meagher =

Canadian athlete (1910–1987)

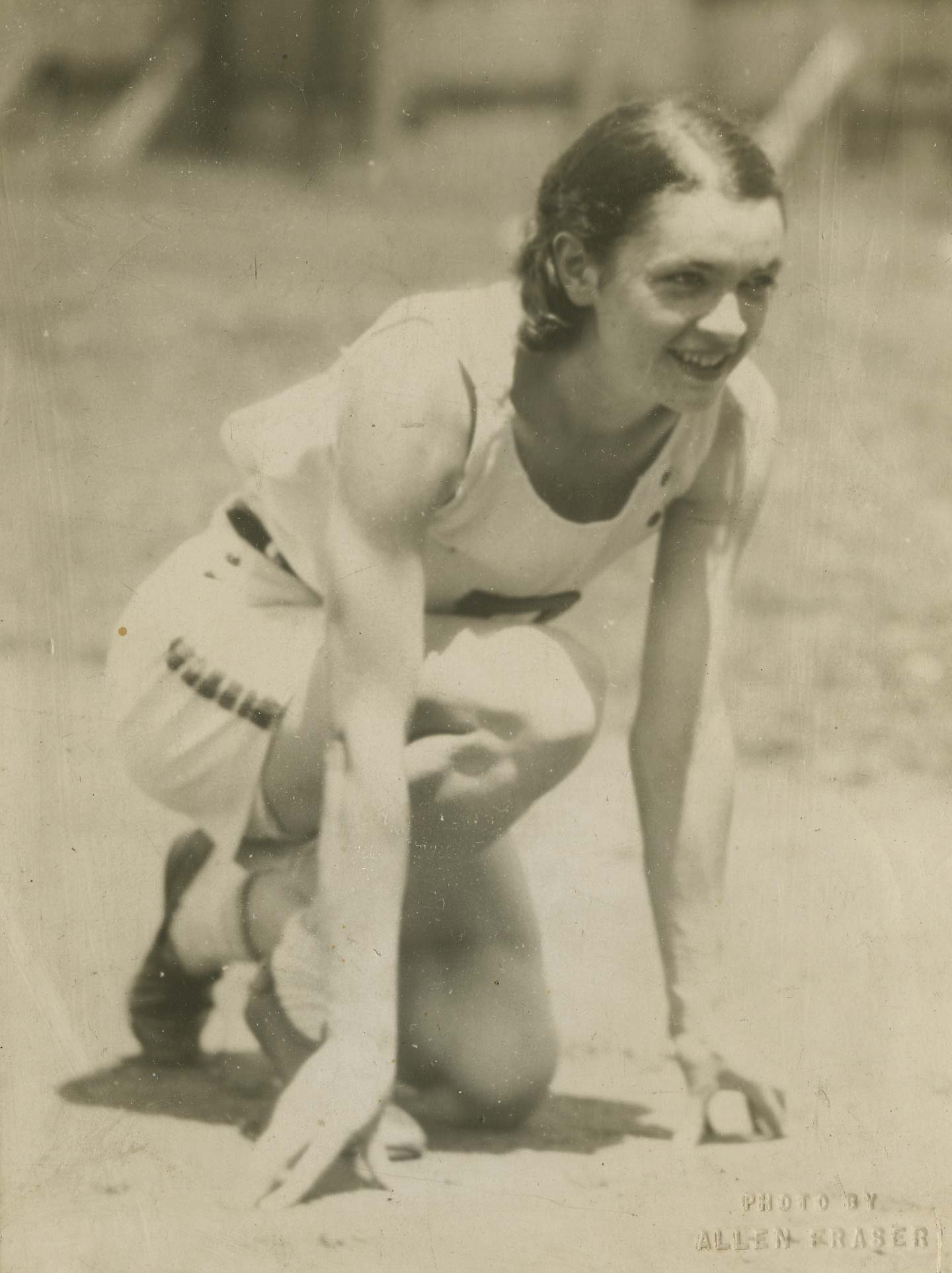
- Meagher in 1932

Personal information
- Full name: Aileen Aletha Meagher
- Born: November 26, 1910 Halifax, Nova Scotia
- Died: August 2, 1987 (aged 76)

Sport
- Country: Canada
- Sport: 4 × 400m Relay

Achievements and titles
- Olympic finals: 1936
Medal record
Women's athletics
Representing Canada
Olympic Games
Bronze medal – third place	1936 Berlin	4x100 m relay
British Empire Games
Gold medal – first place	1934 London	4×110/220 yd
Silver medal – second place	1934 London	220 yards
Silver medal – second place	1934 London	3×110/220 yd
Silver medal – second place	1938 Sydney	3×110/220 yd
Bronze medal – third place	1938 Sydney	4×110/220 yd

Aileen Aletha Meagher (November 26, 1910 – August 2, 1987) was a Canadian athlete who competed in the 1936 Summer Olympics, sharing bronze in the 4×100 metres event. She was also a painter.

== Life ==
She was born and died in Halifax, Nova Scotia. She joined the track team at Dalhousie University. She was Canadian record holder in the 100- and 220-yard events.

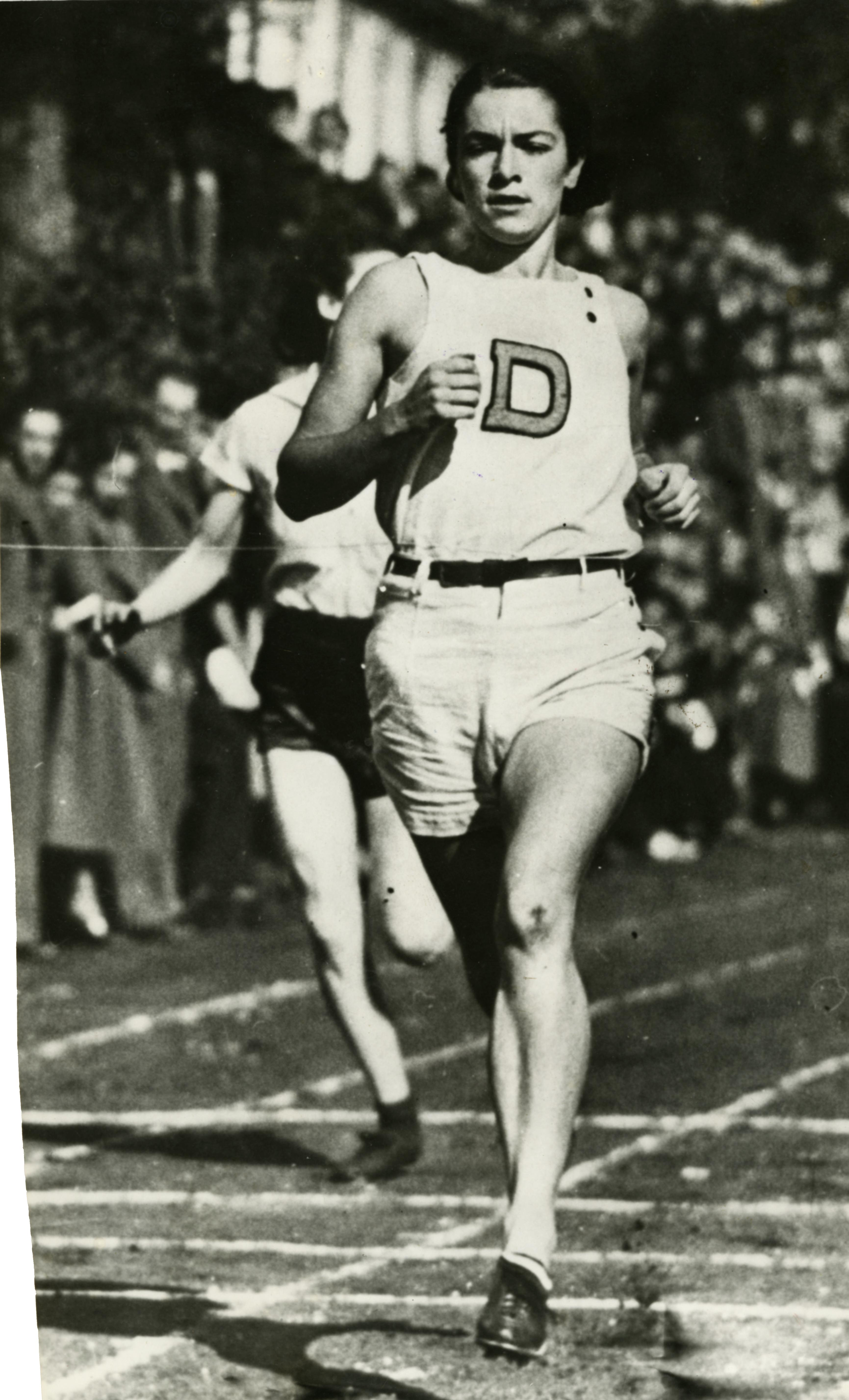

In 1936 she was a member of the Canadian relay team which won the bronze medal in the 4×100 metres event with her teammates Dorothy Brookshaw, Mildred Dolson and Hilda Cameron. In the 100 metre competition Meagher was eliminated in the semi-finals.

At the 1934 Empire Games, she won the gold medal with the Canadian team in the 220-110-220-110 yards relay contest and the silver medal in the 110-220-110 yards relay competition. In the 220 yards event, she won the silver medal. Four years later she was part of the Canadian team she won the silver medal in the 110-220-110 yards relay competition and the bronze medal in the 220-110-220-110 yards relay event. In the 220 yards competition she finished fourth.

In 1935, she was awarded the Velma Springstead Trophy, presented annually to Canada's outstanding female athlete. In 1965, she was inducted into the Canadian Olympic Hall of Fame. She is also a member of the Nova Scotia Sport Hall of Fame and the Canada's Sports Hall of Fame. In 2018, Meagher was named one of the greatest 15 athletes in Nova Scotia's history, ranking eighth.
