= Jeanette Dolson =

Canadian sprinter (1918–2004)

Medal record

Women's athletics

Representing Canada

Olympic Games
Bronze medal – third place	1936 Berlin	4×100 m relay

British Empire Games
Silver medal – second place	1938 Sydney	3×110/220 yd
Bronze medal – third place	1938 Sydney	100 yards
Bronze medal – third place	1938 Sydney	4×110/220 yd

Mildred Jeannette Dolson (later Cavill, August 13, 1918 – July 17, 2004) was a Canadian athlete who competed in the 1936 Summer Olympics.

She was born in Toronto, Ontario, Canada and died in North Palm Beach, Florida, United States.

In 1936 she won the bronze medal in the 4×100 metres relay event with her team mates Dorothy Brookshaw, Hilda Cameron and Aileen Meagher. In the 100 metre competition she was eliminated in the semi-finals.

At the 1938 Empire Games she was a member of the Canadian team which won the silver medal in the 110-220-110 yards relay contest and the bronze medal in the 220-110-220-110 yards relay event. She also won the bronze medal in the 100 yards competition and in the 220 yards contest she was eliminated in the semi-finals.

In 1939 Jeanette was awarded the Velma Springstead Trophy (Canada's Outstanding Female Athlete) for Track and Field.
