= Decima Norman =

Australian long jumper (1909–1983)

Decima Norman MBE
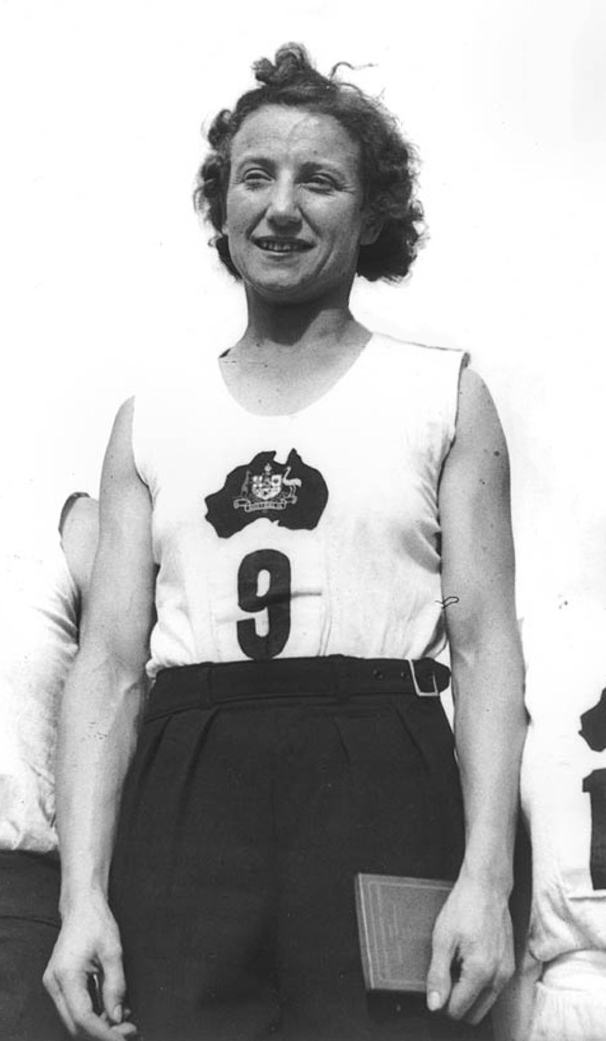
- Decima Norman, Empire Games, Sydney, 11 February 1938

Personal information
- Nationality: Australian
- Born: Clara Decima Norman; 9 September 1909 West Perth, Western Australia
- Died: 29 August 1983 (aged 73) Albany, Western Australia

Sport
- Country: Australia
- Sport: Athletics
- Event(s): Sprint, hurdles, long jump
- Coached by: Frank Preston
- Retired: 1940

Achievements and titles
- Personal best(s): 100 m – 11.8 (1936); 200 m – 24.4 (1938); 80 mH – 11.8 (1939); LJ – 5.80 m (1938)
Medal record
Representing Australia
British Empire Games
Gold medal – first place	1938 Sydney	100 yards
Gold medal – first place	1938 Sydney	220 yards
Gold medal – first place	1938 Sydney	3×110/220 yd
Gold medal – first place	1938 Sydney	4×110/220 yd
Gold medal – first place	1938 Sydney	Long jump

Clara Decima Hamilton (née Norman), MBE (9 September 1909 – 29 August 1983) was an Australian athlete. She was the only Australian woman who won five gold medals at the 1938 British Empire Games.

== Biography ==
Norman was born on 9 September 1909 in Tammin, Western Australia. Her parents died when she was young, and she was adopted by her brother and his wife, who lived in Perth. She participated in several sports at school, and was named champion athlete at Perth College in 1923.

A lack of organised competition and training for female athletes in the 1920s saw Norman take up hockey, although she continued to train herself in track and field athletics until 1932, when she was spotted by former professional athlete Frank Preston, who saw her potential and offered to train her.

Norman's improving times, and several victories in the WA state titles, prompted Preston to consider her to represent Australia in the 1934 Empire Games to be held in London. However, to compete at the games, she needed to be a member of the Women's Amateur Athletic Association of Australia, and in turn a West Australian women's athletics club, none of which existed. Norman eventually managed to establish such a club and join the WAAAA, but too late for her to qualify for the 1934 Empire Games or even the 1936 Summer Olympics in Berlin. The efforts of Norman and Preston paid off, as several women's athletics clubs formed in WA, resulting in the state sending a women's team for the first time to the 1937 National Athletics Championships in Melbourne. Norman's performance in Melbourne qualified her to compete in the 1938 British Empire Games, to be held in Sydney.

Norman was the first Australian to win a gold medal in Sydney, with an 11.1 second time in the 100-yard sprint. She followed this up with a win in the final leg of the 440-yard medley relay, an Empire record-breaking long jump, the 220-yard sprint, and the 660-yard relay. She established herself as the premier athlete of the event, Australia's first athletics 'golden girl'. Her record five gold medals in a single games was not equalled until 1990, when swimmer Hayley Lewis took five golds in Auckland, and not beaten until Susie O'Neill won six golds in Kuala Lumpur in 1998. Norman remained in Sydney, to begin training for the next Olympics, however her further athletic ambitions were blunted, when the 1940 Olympics were cancelled due to World War II. She last competed (for New South Wales) at the 1940 National Championships in Perth.

After retiring, she married New Zealand rugby union player Eric Hamilton. She was made a Member of the Order of the British Empire (MBE) in the 1983 New Year Honours, and was the custodian of the Commonwealth Games Baton in the same year, flying the Queen's Baton from London to the 1982 Commonwealth Games in Brisbane. She died of cancer in Albany, Western Australia on 29 August 1983.

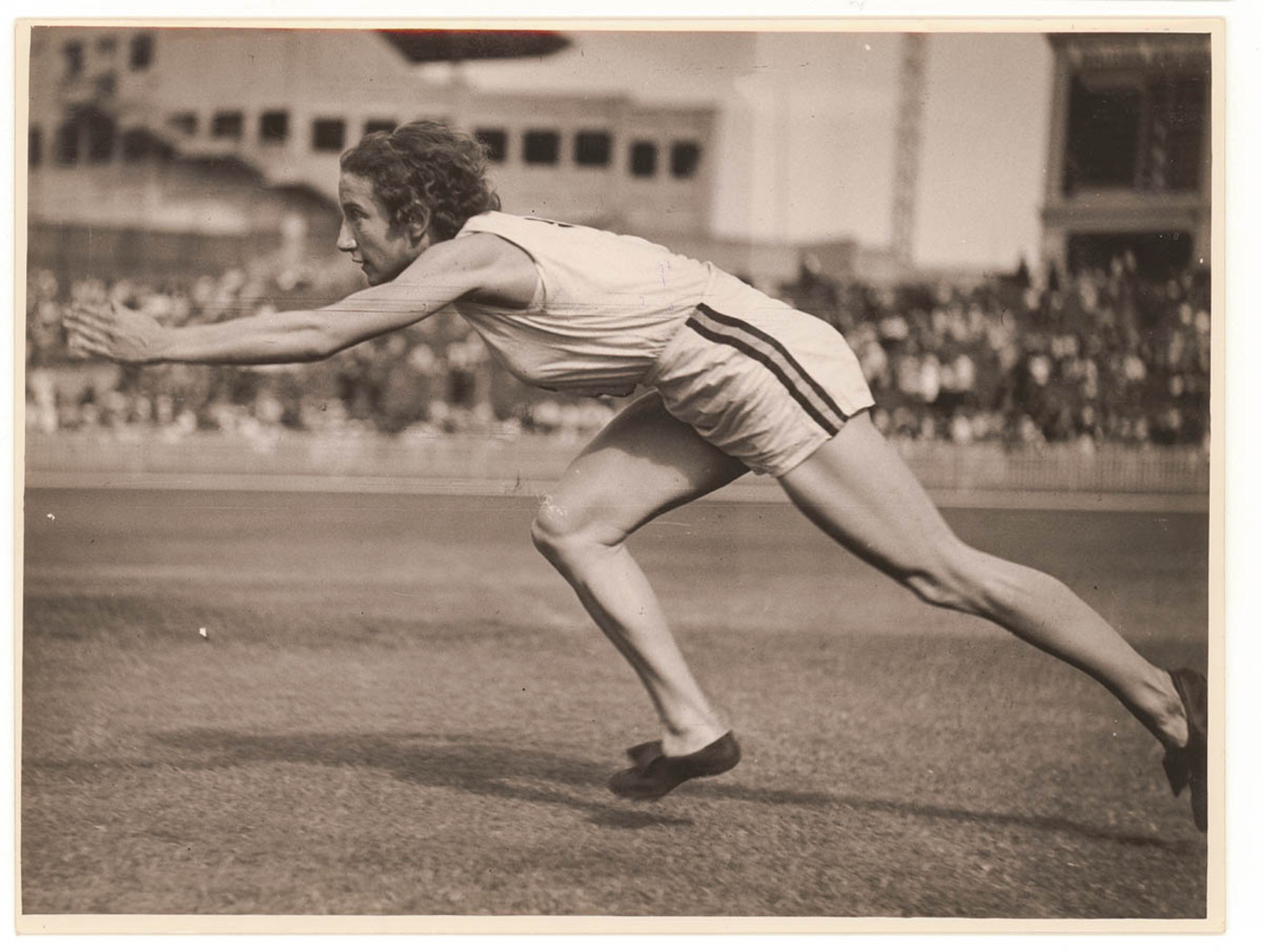
Decima Norman, Empire Games, Sydney, 1938
