= Athletics at the 1938 British Empire Games – Men's 100 yards =

Men's 100 yards at the 1938 British Empire Games
- Venue: Sydney Cricket Ground
- Date: 5 February
- Competitors: 19 from 7 nations
- Winning time: 9.7

Medalists
gold medal	Cyril Holmes	England
silver medal	John Mumford	Australia
bronze medal	Ted Best	Canada

The men's 100 yards event at the 1938 British Empire Games was held on 5 February at the Sydney Cricket Ground in Sydney, Australia.

== Results ==
=== Heats ===
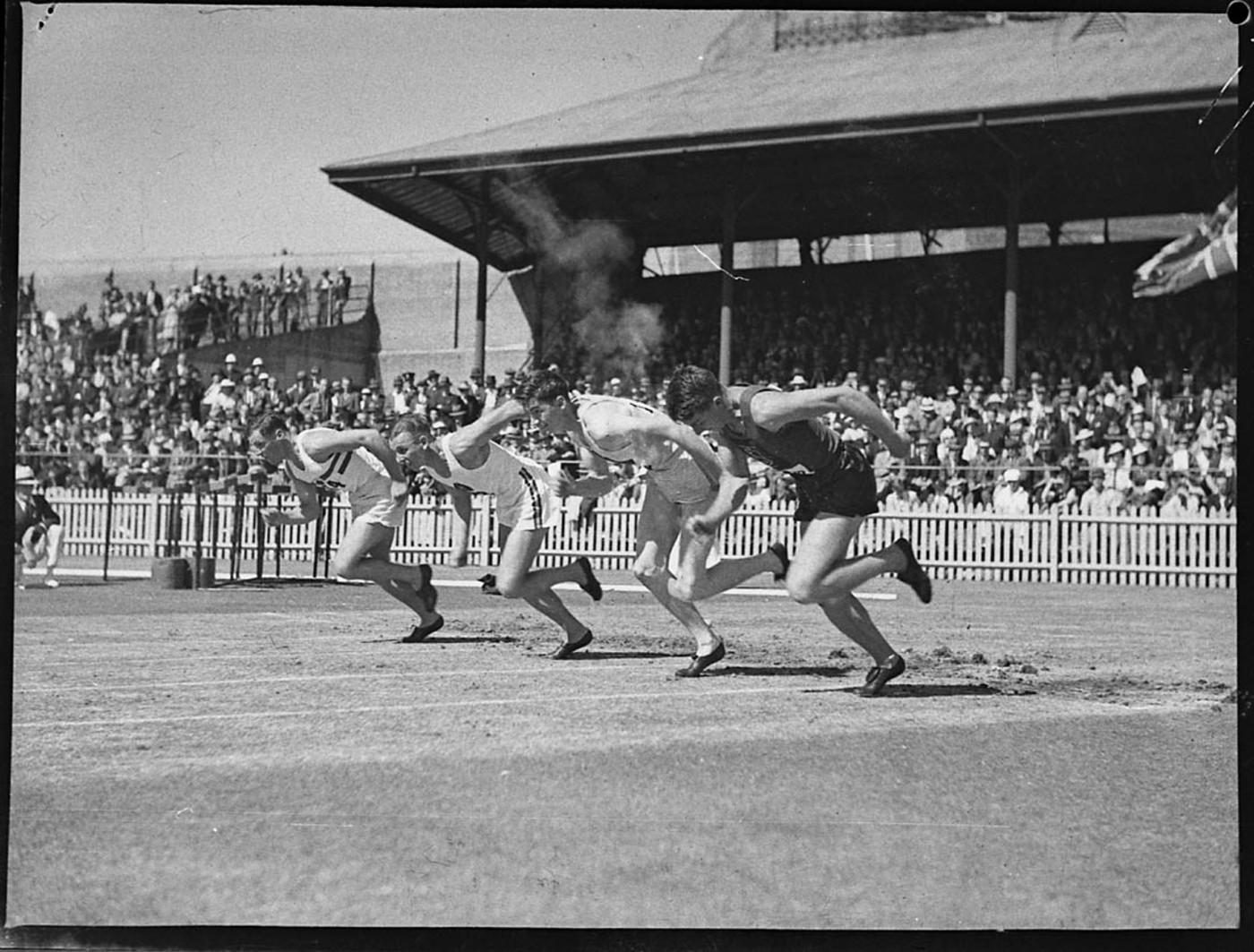
Heat 3

Qualification: First 3 in each heat (Q) qualify directly for the semifinals.

Rank	Heat	Name	Nationality	Time	Notes
1	1	Tom Lavery	South Africa	10.0	Q
2	1	Howard Yates	Australia	10.1e	Q, 1 foot behind
3	1	Sigurd Nielson	Canada	??.?	Q, inches behind
4	1	Lawrence Wallace	England	??.?	
5	1	Graham Quinn	New Zealand	??.?	
1	2	John Mumford	Australia	10.0	Q
2	2	Jack Brown	Canada	10.2e	Q, 1.5 yards behind
3	2	John Cumberbatch	Trinidad and Tobago	??.?	Q, 1 foot behind
4	2	Cecil LeSeur	Southern Rhodesia	10.4e	
5	2	Ken Richardson	England	10.4e	
1	3	Cyril Holmes	England	10.0	Q
2	3	Ted Hampson	Australia	10.1e	Q, 1 yard behind
3	3	Patrick Haley	Canada	10.2e	Q, 1 yard behind
4	3	Sid Kiel	South Africa	??.?	
1	4	Ted Best	Australia	10.0	Q
2	4	Denis Shore	South Africa	10.2e	Q, 3 yards behind
3	4	Phillip Sharpley	New Zealand	??.?	Q, 1 yard behind
4	4	Sandy Duncan	England	10.4e	
5	4	John Harrison	Canada	10.4e	

=== Semifinals ===
Qualification: First 3 in each heat (Q) qualify directly for the final.

Rank	Heat	Name	Nationality	Time	Notes
1	1	Tom Lavery	South Africa	9.9	Q, =GR
2	1	John Mumford	Australia	10.1e	Q, 1.5 yards behind
3	1	Howard Yates	Australia	10.2e	Q, 0.5 yard behind
4	1	John Cumberbatch	Trinidad and Tobago	10.2e	
5	1	Sigurd Nielson	Canada	10.3e	
6	1	Phillip Sharpley	New Zealand	10.4e	
1	2	Cyril Holmes	England	9.9	Q, =GR
2	2	Ted Best	Australia	10.0e	Q, 1 yard behind
3	2	Ted Hampson	Australia	10.1e	Q, 0.5 yard behind
4	2	Jack Brown	Canada	??.?	
5	2	Patrick Haley	Canada	??.?	
6	2	Denis Shore	South Africa	??.?	

=== Final ===
Rank	Name	Nationality	Time	Notes
1st place, gold medalist(s)	Cyril Holmes	England	9.7	GR
2nd place, silver medalist(s)	John Mumford	Australia	9.8e	1 yard behind
3rd place, bronze medalist(s)	Ted Best	Australia	9.9e	0.5 yard behind
4	Tom Lavery	South Africa	9.9e	
5	Ted Hampson	Australia	10.0e	
6	Howard Yates	Australia	10.1e	
