= Athletics at the 1938 British Empire Games – Men's 220 yards =

Men's 220 yards at the Commonwealth Games

The men's 220 yards event at the 1938 British Empire Games was held on 7 and 10 February at the Sydney Cricket Ground in Sydney, Australia.

== Medalists ==
Gold	Silver	Bronze
Cyril Holmes; England	John Mumford; Australia	Ted Best; Australia

== Results ==
=== Heats ===
Held on 7 February

Qualification: First 3 in each heat (Q) qualify directly for the semifinals.

Rank	Heat	Name	Nationality	Time	Notes
1	1	John Mumford	Australia	21.6	Q, GR
2	1	Denis Shore	South Africa	??.?	Q, 2 yards behind
3	1	John Cumberbatch	Trinidad and Tobago	??.?	Q, 1.5 yards behind
4	1	Ken Richardson	England	??.?	
5	1	John Harrison	Canada	??.?	
1	2	Cyril Holmes	England	22.0	Q
2	2	Ted Hampson	Australia	22.1e	Q, 1 yard behind
3	2	Jack Brown	Canada	??.?	Q, 2.5 yards behind
4	2	Cecil LeSeur	Southern Rhodesia	22.5e	
1	3	Ted Best	Australia	21.6	Q, =GR
2	3	Larry O'Connor	Canada	??.?	Q, 1 yard behind
3	3	Graham Quinn	New Zealand	??.?	Q, 4 yards behind
4	3	Lawrence Wallace	England	??.?	
1	4	Bill Roberts	England	21.5	Q, GR
2	4	Howard Yates	Australia	22.1e	Q, 5 yards behind
3	4	Duncan White	British Ceylon	??.?	Q, 4 yards behind
4	4	Sigurd Nielson	Canada	??.?	
5	4	Alan Sayers	New Zealand	??.?	

=== Semifinals ===
Held on 7 February

Qualification: First 3 in each heat (Q) qualify directly for the final.

Rank	Heat	Name	Nationality	Time	Notes
1	1	Larry O'Connor	Canada	21.5	Q, GR
2	1	Bill Roberts	England	??.?	Q, 0.5 yard behind
3	1	John Mumford	Australia	21.6e	Q, 1 foot behind
4	1	Ted Hampson	Australia	21.6e	
5	1	Graham Quinn	New Zealand	??.?	
	1	Duncan White	British Ceylon	DNF	
1	2	Cyril Holmes	England	21.3	Q
2	2	Ted Best	Australia	21.4e	Q, 1 foot behind
3	2	Howard Yates	Australia	21.4e	Q, inches behind
4	2	Jack Brown	Canada	21.5e	
5	2	Denis Shore	South Africa	??.?	
6	2	John Cumberbatch	Trinidad and Tobago	??.?	

=== Final ===
Held on 10 February

Rank	Name	Nationality	Time	Notes
1st place, gold medalist(s)	Cyril Holmes	England	21.2	GR
2nd place, silver medalist(s)	John Mumford	Australia	21.3e	1 yard behind
3rd place, bronze medalist(s)	Ted Best	Australia	21.4e	0.5 yard behind
4	Larry O'Connor	Canada	21.6e	
5	Howard Yates	Australia	21.7e	
6	Bill Roberts	England	21.7e	
