= Athletics at the 1938 British Empire Games – Men's 4 × 110 yards relay =

Men's 4 × 110 yards relay at the Commonwealth Games

The men's 4 × 110 yards relay event at the 1938 British Empire Games was held on 10 February at the Sydney Cricket Ground in Sydney, Australia.

== Results ==
| Rank | Nation | Athletes | Time | Notes |
|---|---|---|---|---|
| 1st place, gold medalist(s) | Canada | Jack Brown, Pat Haley, John Loaring, Larry O'Connor | 41.6 | GR |
| 2nd place, silver medalist(s) | England | Ken Richardson, Sandy Duncan, Lawrence Wallace, Cyril Holmes | 41.8e | 2 yards behind |
| 3rd place, bronze medalist(s) | Australia | Ted Best, Alf Watson, Ted Hampson, Howard Yates | 41.9e | 1 yard behind |
