= 1938 European Athletics Championships – Men's 110 metres hurdles =

Men's 110 metres hurdles at the European Athletics Championships

The men's 110 metres hurdles at the 1938 European Athletics Championships was held in Paris, France, at Stade Olympique de Colombes on 4 September 1938.

== Medalists ==
Gold	Donald Finlay; Great Britain
Silver	Håkan Lidman; Sweden
Bronze	Reindert Brasser; Netherlands

== Results ==
=== Final ===
4 September

Rank	Name	Nationality	Time	Notes
1st place, gold medalist(s)	Donald Finlay	Great Britain	14.3	CR, AR
2nd place, silver medalist(s)	Håkan Lidman	Sweden	14.5	
3rd place, bronze medalist(s)	Reindert Brasser	Netherlands	14.8	
4	John Thornton	Great Britain	14.8	
5	Karl Kumpmann	Germany	15.3	
6	Werner Christen	Switzerland	15.4	

=== Heats ===
4 September

==== Heat 1 ====
Rank	Name	Nationality	Time	Notes
1	Donald Finlay	Great Britain	14.4	CR, Q
2	Reindert Brasser	Netherlands	14.6	NR, Q
3	Svend Aage Thomsen	Denmark	15.4	
4	Abel Elie	France	16.0	

==== Heat 2 ====
Rank	Name	Nationality	Time	Notes
1	Håkan Lidman	Sweden	14.8	Q
2	Werner Christen	Switzerland	15.4	Q
3	Giorgio Oberweger	Italy	17.3	
4	Christos Mantikas	Greece	18.0	

==== Heat 3 ====
Rank	Name	Nationality	Time	Notes
1	Karl Kumpmann	Germany	14.8	Q
2	John Thornton	Great Britain	14.8	Q
3	René Kunz	Switzerland	15.2	
4	Jean-François Brisson	France	15.7	

== Participation ==
According to an unofficial count, 12 athletes from 9 countries participated in the event.

- Denmark (1)
- France (2)
- Germany (1)
- Greece (1)
- Italy (1)
- Netherlands (1)
- Sweden (1)
- Switzerland (2)
- Great Britain (2)
