= Athletics at the 1938 British Empire Games – Men's 120 yards hurdles =

Men's 120 yards hurdles at the Commonwealth Games

The men's 120 yards hurdles event at the 1938 British Empire Games was held on 12 February at the Sydney Cricket Ground in Sydney, Australia.

== Medalists ==
Gold	Silver	Bronze
Tom Lavery; South Africa	Larry O'Connor; Canada	Sid Stenner; Australia

== Results ==
=== Heats ===
Qualification: First 3 in each heat (Q) qualify directly for the final.

Rank	Heat	Name	Nationality	Time	Notes
1	1	Tom Lavery	South Africa	14.4	Q, GR
2	1	Sid Stenner	Australia	14.5e	Q, 0.5 yard behind
3	1	Phillip Sharpley	New Zealand	??.?	Q, 8 yards behind
4	1	Fred Popplewell	Australia	??.?	
1	2	Larry O'Connor	Canada	14.6	Q
2	2	Sid Kiel	South Africa	??.?	Q, 1 yard behind
3	2	Don McLardy	Australia	15.0e	Q, 2 yards behind
4	2	George Wilson	Australia	15.2e	

=== Final ===
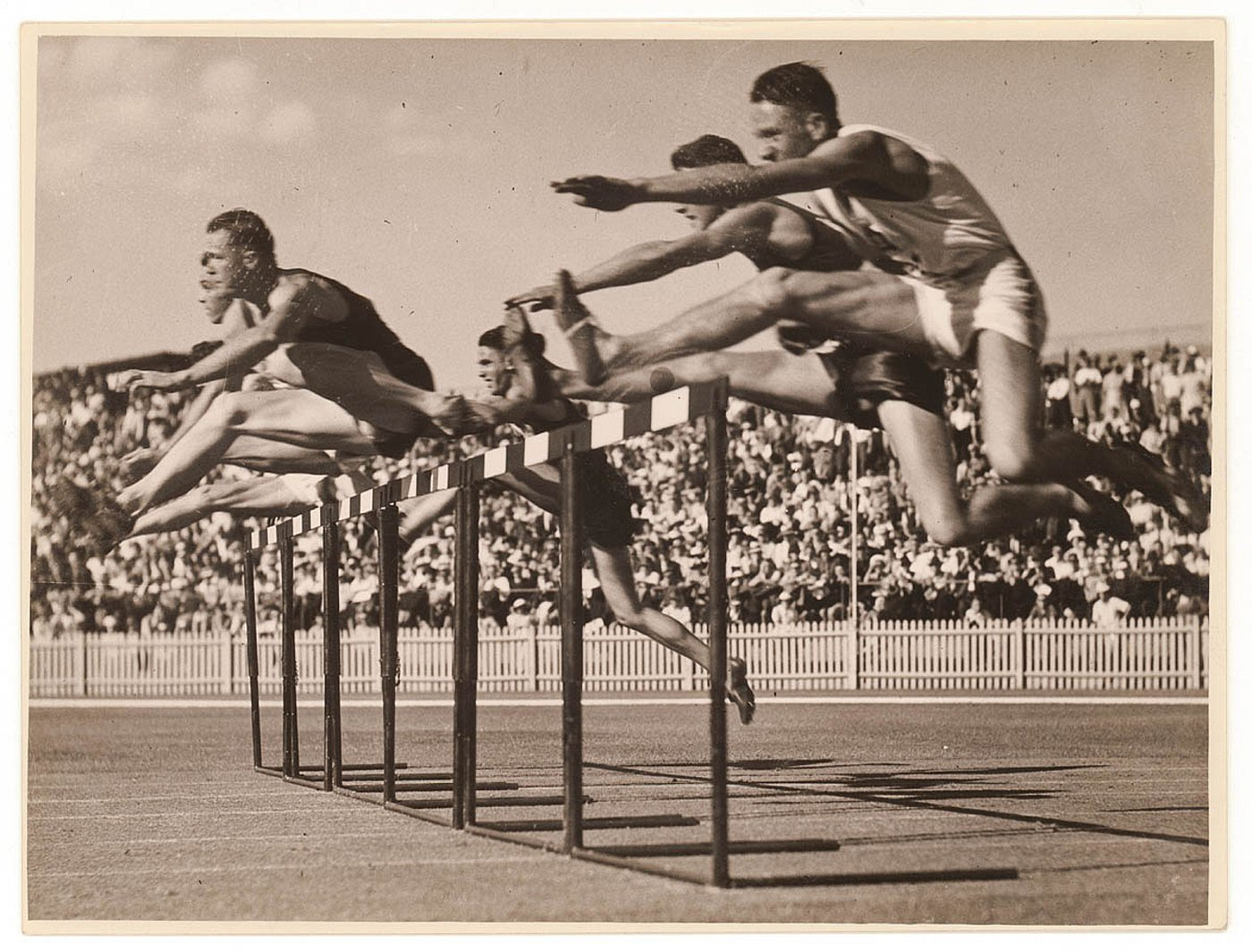
The final underway

Rank	Name	Nationality	Time	Notes
1st place, gold medalist(s)	Tom Lavery	South Africa	14.0 (w)	GR
2nd place, silver medalist(s)	Larry O'Connor	Canada	14.2e (w)	1 yard behind
3rd place, bronze medalist(s)	Sid Stenner	Australia	14.4e (w)	1.5 yards behind
4	Don McLardy	Australia	14.6e (w)	
5	Sid Kiel	South Africa	14.7e (w)	
6	Phillip Sharpley	New Zealand	15.0e (w)	
