= Edward Best =

Edward Best may refer to:

- Edward Mark Best (1899–1941), New Zealand police officer
- Ted Best (Edward Best, 1917–1992), Australian athlete
- Teddy Best (Edward Best, 1874–1957), Australian rules footballer
- Ted Best, a character in the 1982 film Bad Blood
