= Furuta =

Furuta (written: 古田) is a Japanese surname. Notable people with the surname include:

- Arata Furuta (古田 新太; born 1965), Japanese actor
- Atsuya Furuta (古田 敦也; born 1965), Japanese baseball player and player-manager
- Atsuyoshi Furuta (古田 篤良; born 1952), Japanese football player
- Hajime Furuta (古田 肇; born 1947), Japanese politician
- Hiroyuki Furuta (古田 寛幸; born 1991), Japanese football player
- Junko Furuta (古田 順子; 1971–1989), Japanese torture and murder victim
- Keiko Furuta (古田 圭子; born 1982), Japanese professional wrestler
- Kiyoto Furuta (古田 清人; born 1914), Imperial Japanese Navy dive bomber pilot
- Furuta Oribe (古田 織部; 1544–1615), Japanese daimyō
- Satoru Furuta (古田 悟; born 1971), Japanese basketball player
- Seiichirō Furuta (古田 誠一郎; 1897–1992), Japanese social reformer, educator, radio and television personality, and politician
- Furuta Shigekatsu (古田 重勝; 1560–1606), Japanese samurai
- Toshimasa Furuta (古田 俊正), Japanese astronomer
- Tsuneko Furuta (古田 つね子; born 1921), Japanese swimmer
- Yasuharu Furuta (古田 康治; 1914–2008), Japanese hurdler
- Yuki Furuta (古田 佑紀; born 1942), Japanese jurist
