= Athletics at the 1936 Summer Olympics – Men's 110 metres hurdles =

Men's 110 metres hurdles at the Games of the XI Olympiad
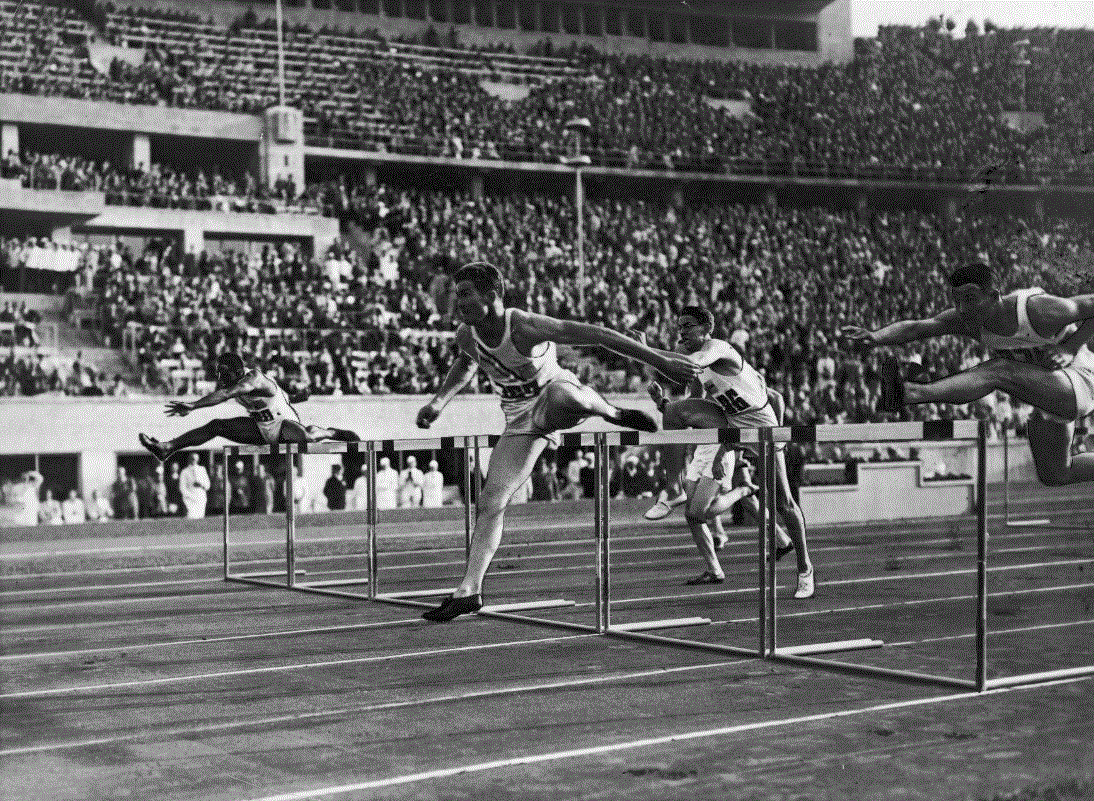
- The last row of hurdles in the 110 metres hurdles final
- Venue: Olympiastadion: Berlin, Germany
- Dates: August 5, 1936 (heats); August 6, 1936 (semifinals and final)
- Competitors: 31 from 20 nations
- Winning time: 14.2

Medalists
1st place, gold medalist(s)		Forrest Towns; United States
2nd place, silver medalist(s)		Don Finlay; Great Britain
3rd place, bronze medalist(s)		Fritz Pollard, Jr. United States

The men's 110 metres hurdles event at the 1936 Summer Olympic Games took place on August 5 and August 6. Thirty-one athletes from 20 nations competed. The maximum number of athletes per nation had been set at 3 since the 1930 Olympic Congress. The final was won by American Forrest Towns. It was the second of nine consecutive American victories, and the eighth overall gold medal for the United States in the 110 metres hurdles. Don Finlay of Great Britain became the second man to win two medals in the event.

== Background ==
This was the tenth appearance of the event, which is one of 12 athletics events to have been held at every Summer Olympics. Two finalists from 1932 returned: bronze medalist Don Finlay of Great Britain and Willi Welscher of Germany, who had been disqualified in the final in Los Angeles. Forrest Towns and Fritz Pollard, Jr. of the United States were the favorites; Towns had set the world record at 14.1 seconds.

The Republic of China, the Philippines, and Yugoslavia each made their first appearance in the event. The United States made its tenth appearance, the only nation to have competed in the 110 metres hurdles in each Games to that point.

== Competition format ==
The competition used the three-round basic format introduced in 1908. The first round consisted of six heats, with 5 or 6 hurdlers each. The top two hurdlers in each heat advanced to the semifinals. The 12 semifinalists were divided into two semifinals of 6 hurdlers each; the top three hurdlers in each advanced to the 6-man final.

== Records ==
These were the standing world and Olympic records (in seconds) prior to the 1936 Summer Olympics.

World record	Forrest Towns (USA)	14.1	Chicago, United States	19 June 1936
Olympic record	George Saling (USA)	14.4	Los Angeles, United States	2 August 1932

Forrest Towns matched his own world record in the first semifinal, lowering the Olympic record by 0.3 seconds in doing so.

== Schedule ==
The semifinals were held on the day of the final instead of the day of the first round.

Date	Time	Round
Wednesday, 5 August 1936	16:30	Round 1
Thursday, 6 August 1936	15:00; 17:45	Semifinals; Final

== Results ==
=== Heats ===
The fastest two runners in each of the six heats advanced to the semifinal round.

==== Heat 1 ====
Rank	Athlete	Nation	Time	Notes
1	Tom Lavery	South Africa	15.0	Q
2	Larry O'Connor	Canada	15.1	Q
3	Khristos Mantikas	Greece	15.2	
4	Svend Aage Thomsen	Denmark	15.3	
5	Juul Bosmans	Belgium	Unknown	
6	Yasuharu Furuta	Japan	Unknown	

==== Heat 2 ====
Rank	Athlete	Nation	Time	Notes
1	Fritz Pollard, Jr.	United States	14.7	Q
2	John Thornton	Great Britain	15.0	Q
3	Johann Langmayr	Austria	15.1	
4	Willi Welscher	Germany	15.2	
5	Huang Yingjie	Republic of China	16.9	

==== Heat 3 ====
Rank	Athlete	Nation	Time	Notes
1	Don Finlay	Great Britain	14.7	Q
2	Tadashi Murakami	Japan	15.3	Q
3	Jim Worrall	Canada	15.6	
4	Darcy Guimarães	Brazil	Unknown	
5	Ludvík Kománek	Czechoslovakia	Unknown	

==== Heat 4 ====
Rank	Athlete	Nation	Time	Notes
1	Roy Staley	United States	15.0	Q
2	Juan Lavenás	Argentina	15.1	Q
3	Ashleigh Pilbrow	Great Britain	15.5	
4	Ioannis Skiadas	Greece	Unknown	
5	Lin Shaozhou	Republic of China	15.7	

==== Heat 5 ====
Rank	Athlete	Nation	Time	Notes
1	Forrest Towns	United States	14.5	Q
2	Erwin Wegner	Germany	15.1	Q
3	Ernst Leitner	Austria	15.3	
4	René Kunz	Switzerland	Unknown	
5	Kotaro Shimizu	Japan	Unknown	

==== Heat 6 ====
Rank	Athlete	Nation	Time	Notes
1	Håkan Lidman	Sweden	14.9	
2	Vane Ivanović	Yugoslavia	15.1	
3	Gianni Caldana	Italy	15.1	
4	Alf Watson	Australia	15.1	
5	Miguel White	Philippines	Unknown	

=== Semifinals ===
The fastest three runners in each of the two heats advanced to the final round.

==== Semifinal 1 ====
Rank	Athlete	Nation	Time	Notes
1	Forrest Towns	United States	14.1	Q, =WR, OR
2	Håkan Lidman	Sweden	14.5	Q
3	John Thornton	Great Britain	14.7	
4	Roy Staley	United States	14.8	
5	Tadashi Murakami	Japan	15.1	
6	Juan Lavenás	Argentina	15.6	

==== Heat 2 ====
Rank	Athlete	Nation	Time	Notes
1	Don Finlay	Great Britain	14.5	Q
2	Fritz Pollard, Jr.	United States	14.6	Q
3	Larry O'Connor	Canada	15.0	
4	Vane Ivanović	Yugoslavia	15.2	
5	Erwin Wegner	Germany	15.3	
6	Tom Lavery	South Africa	15.6	

=== Final ===
Pollard led early. Towns caught him at the third hurdle, going on to win "quite easily." Finlay finished strong, just passing Pollard at the end.

Rank	Athlete	Nation	Time
1st place, gold medalist(s)	Forrest Towns	United States	14.2
2nd place, silver medalist(s)	Don Finlay	Great Britain	14.4
3rd place, bronze medalist(s)	Fritz Pollard, Jr.	United States	14.4
4	Håkan Lidman	Sweden	14.4
5	John Thornton	Great Britain	14.7
6	Larry O'Connor	Canada	14.8
