= Floors Duvenhage =

South African rugby union player

Floors Duvenage
- Full name: Florus Petrus Duvenage
- Born: 6 November 1917 Boksburg, South Africa
- Died: 16 September 1999 (aged 81)
- Height: 1.83 m (6 ft 0 in)
- Weight: 78.9 kg (174 lb)

Rugby union career
- Position: Three–quarter
Provincial / State sides
Years	Team	Apps	(Points)
- Transvaal
- Northern Transvaal
- Griqualand West
International career
Years	Team	Apps	(Points)
1949	South Africa	2	(0)

Florus Petrus Duvenage (6 November 1917 – 16 September 1999) was a South African international rugby union player

Duvenage was born in Boksburg and educated at Hoërskool Oosterlig.

A three–quarter, Duvenage started his provincial career with Transvaal, before representing Northern Transvaal while attached to the Garrison club during the war. He served on the same battalion as Denis Shore and was said to have gotten the better of the Olympic sprinter when they competed in athletic meets. After the war, Duvenage turned out with Griqualand West and in 1949 was capped for the Springboks in two home Tests matches against the All Blacks. He appeared as an outside centre at Newlands and was on the right wing for the match at Kingsmead.

Duvenage's son, also named Florus, represented Transvaal in rugby.

== See also ==
- List of South Africa national rugby union players
