= Yasutarō =

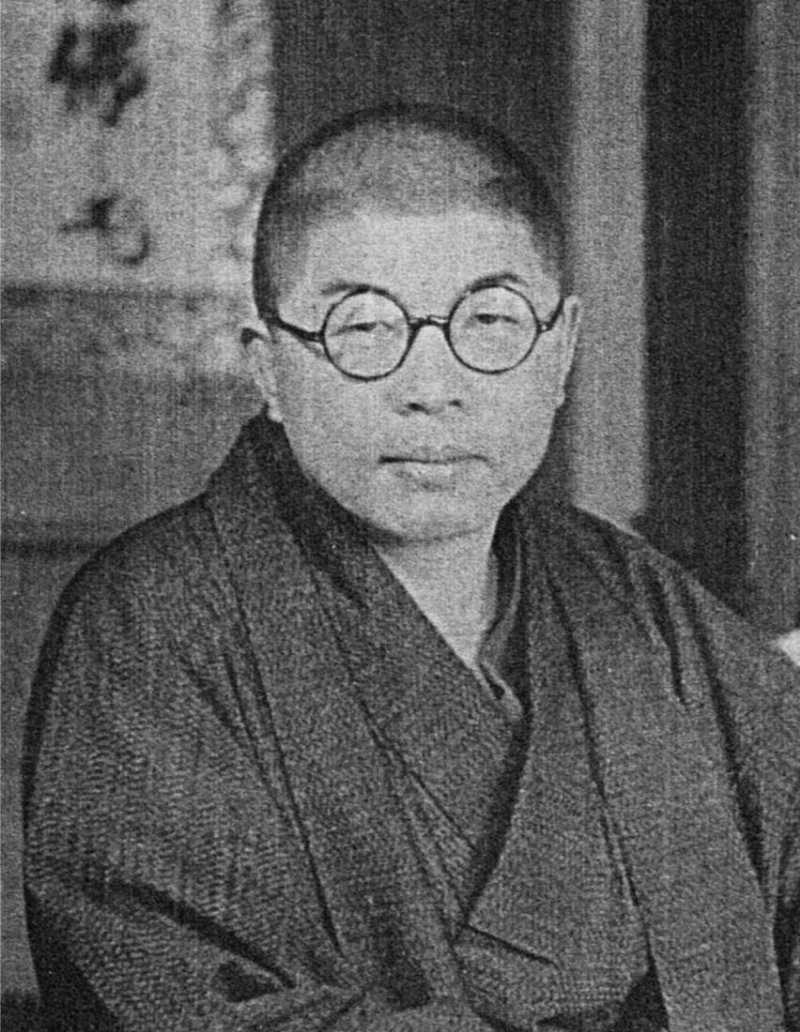
- Yasutaro Yagi (1903–1987), Japanese screenwriter
- Pronunciation: jasɯtaɾoɯ (IPA)
- Gender: Male

Origin
- Origin: Japanese
- Meaning: Different meanings depending on the kanji used

Other names
- Alternative spelling: Yasutaro (Kunrei-shiki) Yasutaro (Nihon-shiki) Yasutarō, Yasutaro, Yasutarou (Hepburn)

Yasutarō, Yasutaro or Yasutarou is a masculine Japanese given name.

== Written forms ==
Yasutarō can be written using many different combinations of kanji characters. Here are some examples:

The characters used for "taro" (太郎) literally means "thick (big) son" and usually used as a suffix to a masculine name, especially for the first son. The "yasu" part of the name can use a variety of characters, each of which will change the meaning of the name ("靖" for peaceful, "保" for preserve, "易" and so on).

- 靖太郎, "peaceful, big son"
- 保太郎, "preserve, big son"
- 易太郎, "divination, big son"
- 安太郎, "tranquil, big son"

Other combinations...

- 靖太朗, "peaceful, thick, bright"
- 靖多朗, "peaceful, many, bright"
- 靖汰朗, "peaceful, excessive, bright"
- 保太朗, "preserve, thick, bright"
- 安多朗, "tranquil, many, bright"

The name can also be written in hiragana やすたろう or katakana ヤスタロウ.

== Notable people with the name ==
- John Yasutaro Naide (名出 保太郎; 1866 – 1945), Anglican bishop
- Yasutaro Koide (小出 保太郎; 1903–2016), Japanese supercentenarian
- Yasutaro Matsuki (松木 安太郎; born 1957), Japanese footballer and manager
- Yasutaro Sakagami (阪上 安太郎; 1912–1984), Japanese water polo player
- Yasutaro Yagi (八木 保太郎; 1903–1987), Japanese screenwriter
