= Yasuharu =

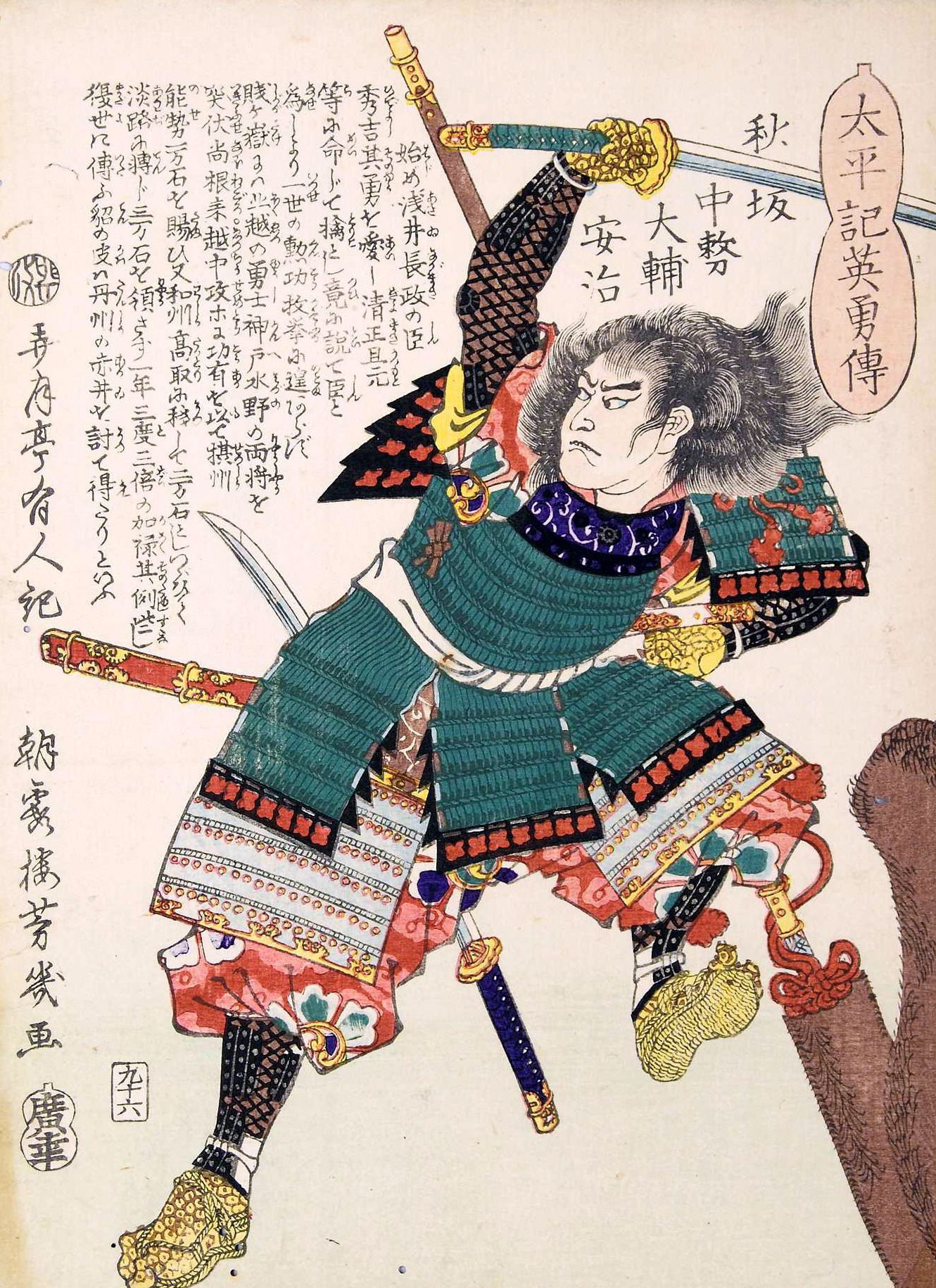
- Yasuharu Wakisaka (1554–1626), Japanese daimyō
- Pronunciation: jasɯhaɾɯ (IPA)
- Gender: Male

Origin
- Origin: Japanese
- Meaning: Different meanings depending on the kanji used

Yasuharu is a masculine Japanese given name.

== Written forms ==
Yasuharu can be written using different combinations of kanji characters. Here are some examples:

- 康治, "healthy, to manage"
- 康春, "healthy, spring"
- 康晴, "healthy, clear (weather)"
- 康温, "healthy, to warm up"
- 靖治, "peaceful, to manage"
- 靖春, "peaceful, spring"
- 靖晴, "peaceful, clear (weather)"
- 靖温, "peaceful, to warm up"
- 安治, "tranquil, to manage"
- 安春, "tranquil, spring"
- 安晴, "tranquil, clear (weather)"
- 保治, "preserve, to manage"
- 保春, "preserve, spring"
- 保温, "preserve, to warm up"
- 泰治, "peaceful, to manage"
- 泰春, "peaceful, spring"
- 泰晴, "peaceful, clear (weather)"
- 易治, "divination, to manage"
- 易春, "divination, spring"
- 恭治, "respectful, to manage"

The name can also be written in hiragana やすはる or katakana ヤスハル.

== Notable people with the name ==
- Yasuharu Chujo (中条 泰治), Japanese Paralympic swimmer
- Yasuharu Fujiwara (藤原 康治; born 1958), Japanese Olympics sailor
- Yasuharu Furuta (古田 康治; 1914–2008), Japanese hurdler
- Yasuharu Hasebe (長谷部 安春; 1932–2009), Japanese film director
- Yasuharu Imano (今野 康晴; born 1973), Japanese golfer
- Yasuharu Kawase (河瀬 泰治; born 1959), Japanese rugby union player
- Yasuharu Konishi (小西 康陽; born 1959), Japanese musician
- Yasuharu Kurata (倉田 安治; born 1963), Japanese footballer and manager
- Yasuharu Nakajima (中島 康晴; born 1984), Japanese cyclist
- Yasuharu Nanri (南里 康晴; born 1985), Japanese figure skater
- Yasuharu Ōyama (大山 康晴; 1923–1992), Japanese shogi player
- Yasuharu Sorimachi (反町 康治; born 1964), Japanese footballer and manager
- Yasuharu Suematsu (末松 安晴; born 1932), Japanese physicist
- Yasuharu Takanashi (高梨 康治; born 1964), Japanese anime composer
- Yasuharu Wakisaka (脇坂 安治; 1554–1626), Japanese daimyō
