= Fritz Pollard Jr. =

American hurdler (1915–2003)

Personal information
- Nationality: American
- Born: February 18, 1915
- Died: February 15, 2003 (aged 87)
- Education: University of North Dakota, John Marshall Law School (Chicago)

Sport
- Sport: Track and field
Medal record
Men's athletics
Representing the United States
Bronze medal – third place	1936 Berlin	110 meter hurdles

Fritz Pollard Jr. (February 18, 1915 – February 15, 2003) was an American athlete who competed mainly in the 110 metre hurdles, winning a bronze medal at the 1936 Summer Olympics in Berlin.

== Biography ==
Pollard's father was Fritz Pollard Sr., the first African American head coach in the National Football League. While a student at the University of North Dakota, Pollard Jr. was a running back for the football team in addition to running on the school's track and field team. He was "picked All North Central Conference in 1937 and 1938, and was a Collier's Magazine Little All-America selection in football in 1938." He also competed as a member of the university's varsity boxing team. Pollard competed for the United States in the 1936 Summer Olympics in Berlin in the 110 meter hurdles, winning the bronze medal. In 2016, the 1936 Olympic journey of the eighteen Black American athletes, including Pollard, was documented in the film Olympic Pride, American Prejudice.

As a student, Pollard majored in physical education, joined the Alpha Phi Alpha fraternity, and received his bachelor's degree in 1939, becoming one of the first two African Americans to graduate from the University of North Dakota. He went on to earn a law degree from John Marshall Law School in Chicago. He also served in the U.S. Army as a special services officer during World War II. After a stint working in the Chicago parks and recreation department, he became a Foreign Service officer and retired in 1981 as the director of the State Department's overseas schools for US citizens.

Pollard Jr. was predeceased by his wife, Addiefie Lade Cruikshank Pollard, an educator, pianist, and member of Alpha Kappa Alpha Sorority, Incorporated. A native of Selma, Alabama, she attended Talladega College and the University of Chicago. In 1926, she was selected to participate in an international student tour of Europe. She later worked as a pianist and musical accompanist in Chicago, where she also pursued a career in public education. The couple had two children, Sheryl Pollard and Frederick D. Pollard III., and two grandchildren Meredith Kaye Russell and Marcus Stephan Pollard.
