= Vejle Idrætshøjskole =

Coordinates: 55.71676°N 9.58379°E

Vejle Idrætshøjskole is a Danish Folk high school, which mainly teaches sport. It was founded by Svend Aage Thomsen in 1943 under the name Den Jyske Idrætsskole. In 1998 the school changed name to its current name.
