= Forrest Towns =

American hurdler

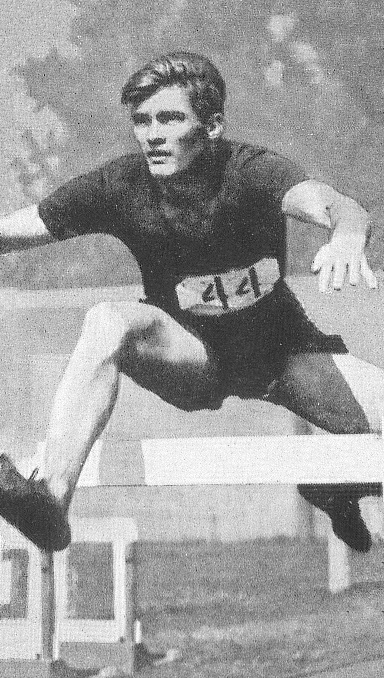

Personal information
- Born: February 6, 1914 Fitzgerald, Georgia, U.S.
- Died: April 9, 1991 (aged 77) Athens, Georgia, U.S.
- Height: 1.88 m (6 ft 2 in)
- Weight: 75 kg (165 lb)

Sport
- Sport: Athletics
- Event: 110 m hurdles
- Club: Georgia Bulldogs, Athens

Achievements and titles
- Personal best: 110 mH – 13.7 (1936)
Medal record
Representing the United States
Olympic Games
| Gold medal – first place | 1936 Berlin | 110 m hurdles |

Forrest Grady "Spec" Towns (February 6, 1914 – April 9, 1991) was an American track and field athlete and coach. He was the 1936 Olympic champion in the 110 m hurdles and broke the world record in that event three times.

Born in Fitzgerald, Georgia, Towns grew up in Augusta, Georgia, where he played football in high school at Richmond Academy. In 1933, he earned a football scholarship to the University of Georgia (UGA) after a sports journalist had seen him high jumping in his backyard.

Rather than high jumping, Towns specialized in the high hurdles. While competing on the UGA Track Team from 1933 to 1937, Towns won five Southeastern Conference individual titles and two NCAA titles. He won both the NCAA and AAU titles in the 120 y hurdles event in 1935. It was the beginning of a 60 race winning streak, lasting until 1937.

In 1936, Towns was named to the American Olympic team, becoming the first Georgian to achieve this. During the Olympics in Berlin, Germany, Towns became the world record holder with 14.1, and he won the Olympic gold in 14.2. Also, he became the first Georgian to earn Olympic Gold. Shortly after the Games, he became the first hurdler under 14 seconds. At a race in Oslo, he dramatically improved the world record to 13.7 – a time that would stand until 1950.

After college, Towns became head track and field coach at his alma mater, Georgia, a position he held until 1975. In 1991, he died of a heart attack in Athens, Georgia at age 77. He was honored at the University with the naming of the Spec Towns Track in 1991, and an annual meet called the Spec Towns Invitational.

Towns was voted into the Georgia Hall of Fame (1967), the USATF Hall of Fame (1975), the University of Georgia Athletic Association’s Circle of Honor (1997), and in 2025, Towns became the first University of Georgia track athlete to be named to the Collegiate Track & Field/Cross Country Athlete Hall of Fame.

Towns was the official starter for the first-ever Peachtree Road Race on July 4, 1970.

== See also ==
- Olympic medalists in athletics (men)

Greek bibliography: Andreou, Evangelos: "The star of champion shone..." Ed. EUARCE 2011 ('"Forrest Towns" p. 30,105') Ευάγγελος Ανδρέου, Το αστέρι του πρωταθλητή άναψε... / ο βαλκανιονίκης του μεσοπολέμου Γιάννης Σκιαδάς, EUARCE 2011 ISBN 978-960-99566-0-4 ("Φόρεστ Τάουνς/Forrest Towns" σ.30,105)
