= Tadashi Murakami (athlete) =

Japanese hurdler

Personal information
- Nationality: Japanese
- Born: 7 October 1912

Sport
- Sport: Track and field
- Event: 110 metres hurdles

Tadashi Murakami (born 7 October 1912, date of death unknown) was a Japanese hurdler. He competed in the men's 110 metres hurdles at the 1936 Summer Olympics.
