= Ling Shuw-chow =

Taiwanese hurdler

Personal information
- Nationality: Chinese
- Born: 5 May 1909 Tainan, Japanese Taiwan
- Died: November 1987 Chengdu, Sichuan, People's Republic of China

Sport
- Sport: Track and field
- Event: 110 metres hurdles

Ling Shuw-chow (Chinese: 林紹洲; pinyin: Lín Shàozhōu, born 5 May 1909 – November 1987) was a Taiwanese hurdler who represented China. He competed in the men's 110 metres hurdles at the 1936 Summer Olympics.
