= Sid Kiel =

Personal information
- Full name: Sidney Kiel
- Born: 18 July 1916; Vrede, Orange Free State, South Africa
- Died: 19 July 2007 (aged 91); Sea Point, Western Cape, South Africa
- Batting: Right-handed
- Bowling: Right-arm medium
- Role: Opening batsman

Domestic team information
- Years: Team
- 1939–1947: Western Province

Career statistics
Competition	FC
Matches	14
Runs scored	1,061
Batting average	44.20
100s/50s	3/6
Top score	139*
Balls bowled	32
Wickets	0
Bowling average	n/a
5 wickets in innings	0
10 wickets in match	0
Best bowling	0/3
Catches/stumpings	3/–
- Source: CricketArchive, 29 April 2015

Sidney Kiel (18 July 1916 – 19 July 2007) was a South African doctor better known for his sporting career. Both a track and field athlete and a cricketer, he represented South Africa as a hurdler at the 1938 British Empire Games (now the Commonwealth Games), having earlier boycotted the 1936 Summer Olympics. His cricket career as an opening batsman for Western Province spanned from 1939 to his retirement in 1947.

== Early life and athletics career ==
Kiel was born to a Jewish family in Vrede, Orange Free State, but moved to Cape Town at the age of seven following his father's death. He was educated at South African College Schools (SACS) in Newlands, where he was head boy, captain of the cricket and athletics teams, and vice-captain of the rugby team. Kiel first ran for his country at the age of 16, while still at school. Following a 1935 race where he set a South African record for the 110 metres (or 120 yards) hurdles (and was timed within 0.5 seconds of the world record), he was included in the South African delegation for the 1936 Olympics in Berlin, but withdrew in opposition to the German regime's antisemitism. At an October 1937 meet in Cape Town, Kiel recorded a personal best, 14.4 seconds, for the 110 metre hurdles. In that event at the 1938 Empire Games in Sydney, he placed fifth with a time of 14.7 seconds, with the gold medallist being another South African, Tom Lavery.

== Cricket career ==
Finishing his athletics career, Kiel made his first-class cricket debut for Western Province during the 1939–40 season. With the Currie Cup suspended at the time, Western Province's season consisted of two sets of three games, played at home in December 1939 and in the coastal cities of Durban, East London, and Port Elizabeth in March 1940. Opening with Pieter van der Bijl on debut against Griqualand West, Kiel recorded a golden duck, bowled by Alfred Waddington. This however was followed by 36 in the second innings, with his next match, against North Eastern Transvaal, yielding a maiden first-class century, 139 not out. Kiel finished his inaugural season for Western Province with 524 runs from six matches, with a second century, 120, coming against Eastern Province in the last game of the season.

A graduate of the University of Cape Town's medical school, Kiel joined the South African Medical Corps (a South African Army unit) during World War II, serving in the North African and Italian theatres. His cricket career was thus interrupted, with a game against Transvaal during the 1941–42 season being his only first-class match until the war's end. In that match, he came close to carrying his bat in Western Province's second innings, with his captain, Andrew Ralph, declaring at 236/8 when Kiel was undefeated on 128. Kiel managed two games during the 1945–46 season, which include a score of 77 against Natal, and played in five out of six Currie Cup games during the 1946–47 season (the first edition of the tournament since the 1937–38 season). In what was to be his only Currie Cup season he scored 311 runs from 10 innings, including three half-centuries.

== Later life ==
Kiel retired from cricket at the age of 30 to further his medical career, interning at Somerset Hospital before establishing a family practice in Sea Point. He married Jean Kramer in 1949, and had a son and a daughter. He died in the suburb in July 2007, aged 91, having had a heart attack earlier in the year.
