= Kotaro Shimizu =

Japanese track and field athlete

Personal information
- Nationality: Japanese
- Born: 28 May 1911

Sport
- Sport: Track and field
- Event: 110 metres hurdles

Kotaro Shimizu (清水 孝太郎, Shimizu Kōtarō; born 28 May 1911, date of death unknown) was a Japanese hurdler. He competed in the men's 110 metres hurdles at the 1936 Summer Olympics.
