= Ludvík Kománek =

Czech hurdler and triple jumper

Personal information
- Born: 7 August 1909 Břeclav, Moravia, Austria-Hungary
- Died: 19 January 1994 (aged 84)

Sport
- Sport: Track and field
- Event: 110 metres hurdles

Ludvík Kománek (7 August 1909 – 19 January 1994) was a Czech hurdler and triple jumper. He competed in the men's 110 metres hurdles at the 1936 Summer Olympics.

He was born on 7 August 1909 in Břeclav. He was the first Czech who achieved 14 metres threshold in triple jump, when he jumped 14.15 m. In 1930, he became the champion of Czechoslovakia in triple jump. He died on 19 January 1994.
