= Don Finlay =

British athlete and Royal Air Force officer

Don Finlay DFC AFC
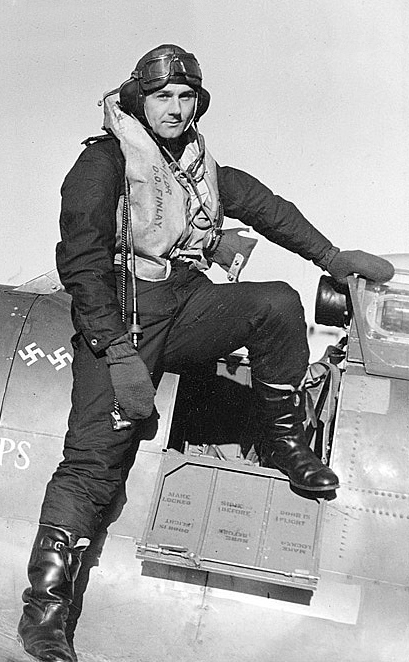
- Squadron Leader Don Finlay on his Spitfire IIA, 41 Squadron, RAF Hornchurch, November 1940

Personal information
- Born: 27 May 1909 Christchurch, Hampshire, England
- Died: 18 April 1970 (aged 60) Great Missenden, England
- Height: 1.82 m (6 ft 0 in)
- Weight: 77 kg (170 lb)

Sport
- Sport: Athletics
- Events: 110 m hurdles, high jump, long jump, shot put, javelin throw
- Club: Royal Air Force; Milocarian AC; Surrey AC

Achievements and titles
- Personal bests: 110 mH – 14.1w (1937), 14.3 (1938); HJ – 1.83 m (1938); LJ – 6.96 m (1938); SP – 11.68 m (1937); JT – 43.23 m (1937)
Medal record
Men's athletics
Representing Great Britain
Olympic Games
Silver medal – second place	1936 Berlin	110 m hurdles
Bronze medal – third place	1932 Los Angeles	110 m hurdles
European Championships
Gold medal – first place	1938 Paris	110 m hurdles
Representing England
British Empire Games
Gold medal – first place	1934 London	120 yd hurdles

Group Captain Donald Osborne Finlay, DFC, AFC (27 May 1909 – 18 April 1970) was a British athlete and Royal Air Force officer.

== Early life ==
Born on 27 May 1909, Donald Osborne Finlay was educated in Southampton, where he attended Taunton's Secondary School. In 1925 he joined the Royal Air Force (RAF), training as ground crew. He qualified as a Fitter, Aero Engines, in August 1928.

== Athletics career ==
A member of Milocarian Athletic Club and Surrey Athletics Club (based in Kingston upon Thames), he represented Great Britain in three Olympics both pre- and post-World War II. In 16 international dual meets, Finlay only lost two hurdles races: to Lord Burghley in 1931 (vs. Italy) and to John Thornton in 1937 (vs. Germany).

He first competed in the 1932 Summer Olympics held in Los Angeles, United States in the 110 metre hurdles where he won the bronze medal. He was also a member of the British relay team which finished sixth in the 4 × 100 metre relay event. He returned to the 1936 Summer Olympics held in Berlin, Germany where he improved to win the silver medal in the 110 metre hurdles. With the British relay team he was eliminated in the first round of the 4 × 100 metre relay competition.

He was the British Team Captain in the 1948 Summer Olympics in London and was chosen to take the Olympic Oath, though he failed to win any medals in these Games when he was eliminated in the first round of the 110 metre hurdles event, hitting the last hurdle with his leading foot and falling at the finish. In 1949, at the age of 40, he won his eighth AAA title and he was the AAA indoor champion in both 1937 and 1938.

At the 1934 Empire Games he won the gold medal in the 120 yards hurdles competition. He also participated in the 1950 British Empire Games and finished fifth in the 120 yards hurdles contest. He was the inter-services champion in the long jump and was RAF champion in the high jump.

== Military career ==
Having received training as a pilot, in April 1935 Finlay was commissioned as a pilot officer. The following month, he was posted to No. 17 Squadron and, later in 1936, to No. 54 Squadron RAF before attending the RAF School of Aeronautical Engineering at Henlow.

During the Second World War Finlay was posted to fly Spitfires as commanding officer of his old No. 54 Squadron, then based at Hornchurch, on 26 August 1940, during the Battle of Britain. He was shot down over Ramsgate two days later and was wounded. After recovering he was posted to command No. 41 Squadron in September. He claimed his first victory, a Messerschmitt Bf 109, over the Channel on 23 September, and by the end of October 1940 he was credited with a 'share' in a second Bf 109 and a Dornier Do 17 bomber, and had also damaged a further three Bf 109s. His aircraft was damaged in combat with Oblt. Hans-Ekkehard Bob of JG 54 on 9 October 1940. He added to his tally on 23 November, shooting down the Bf 109E-1 (Werk No.3868 "Black 3") of Obgfr. Günther Loppach of 11./JG 51, who was taken prisoner, and another Bf 109 on 27 November 1940.

Finlay was promoted to the rank of wing commander in August 1941, becoming the engineering officer for No. 11 Group. He received the Distinguished Flying Cross in June 1942. His victory tally flying fighters was 4 and 2 shared destroyed, 3 and 1 shared damaged.

Finlay then commanded No. 608 Squadron RAF, flying Lockheed Hudsons in the Middle East from December 1943 to July 1944. He was promoted to group captain and appointed Senior Air Staff Officer, 210 Group. In 1945 he commanded No. 906 Wing in Burma, and was awarded the Air Force Cross in September 1944.

As a group captain Finlay was posted to No. 1 School of Technical Training, RAF Halton, as senior technical training officer. He regularly took part in the station sports meeting and even at the age of 43 won every event he entered: 120-yard hurdles, 100 yard sprint, 220 yard sprint, high jump and the long jump. He entered the veterans' (over 40) handicap. He took the offered three yard start in full running kit, unlike all the other entrants who were in shirts and rolled-up trousers. From the start he raced to the tape, to show that he could have won if he wanted to. He then stopped, turned round and started to run back down the track.

Finlay was stationed for much of his time at RAF Acklington, whose chapel contains a later-dedicated stained glass window to honour him. He retired from the RAF in February 1959.

Finlay was severely injured and paralysed in a motor vehicle accident in 1966, which led to his death on 19 April 1970, aged sixty.

In 2012 No. 41(R) Squadron based at RAF Coningsby unveiled a Panavia Tornado GR4 ZA614 "EB-Z" with special tail markings celebrating Finlay's command of the squadron and his achievements in the 1932 and 1936 Games.
