= John Thornton (athlete) =

British hurdler (1911–1944)

Personal information
- Nationality: British
- Born: 6 June 1911 Greasley, England
- Died: 18 August 1944 (aged 33) Normandy, German-occupied France

Sport
- Sport: Track and field
- Event: 110 metres hurdles
- Club: University of Cambridge AC; Achilles Club

John St. Ledger Thornton (6 June 1911 – 18 August 1944) was a British hurdler who competed at the 1936 Summer Olympics. He was killed in action during World War II.

== Biography ==
Thornton was educated at Charterhouse School and Pembroke College, Cambridge.

Thornton finished second behind Don Finlay in the 120 yards hurdles event at the 1936 AAA Championships.

One month later, he was selected to represent Great Britain at the 1936 Olympic Games held in Berlin, where he competed in the men's 110 metres hurdles competition.

Thornton finished second behind Don Finlay again in the 120 yards event at the 1937 AAA Championships and the 1938 AAA Championships.

Thornton served as a major in the Seaforth Highlanders during the Second World War. He served at El Alamein and in the Sicily Campaign, and was killed in action on 18 August 1944 during the Battle of Normandy. Thornton is buried at Banneville-la-Campagne War Cemetery.
