= Håkan Lidman =

Swedish hurdler

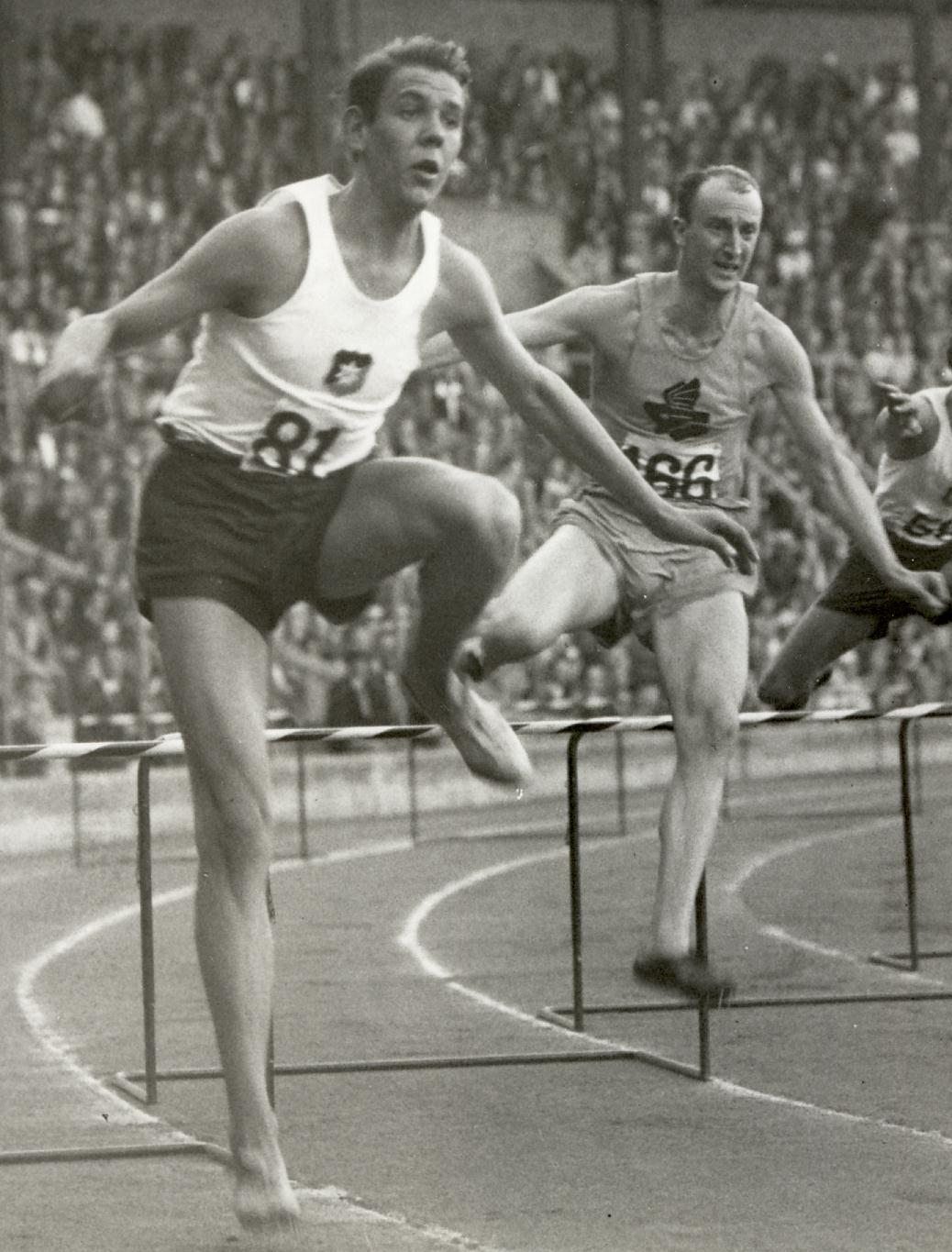
- Lidman (left) vs. Sten Pettersson in 1935

Personal information
- Born: 31 January 1915 Västra Frölunda, Sweden
- Died: 6 June 2000 (aged 85) Estepona, Spain
- Height: 1.89 m (6 ft 2 in)
- Weight: 78 kg (172 lb)

Sport
- Sport: Athletics
- Event: 110 m hurdles
- Club: Örgryte IS, Göteborg; Rydboholms SK, Viskafors

Achievements and titles
- Personal best: 110 mH – 14.0 (1940)
Medal record
Men's athletics
Representing Sweden
European Championships
Gold medal – first place	1946 Oslo	110 m hurdles
Silver medal – second place	1938 Paris	110 m hurdles

Håkan Lidman (31 January 1915 – 6 June 2000) was a Swedish hurdler who specialized in the 110 m event. He competed at the 1936 and 1948 Summer Olympics and finished fourth and sixth, respectively. He won two medals at the European championships: a gold in 1946 and a silver in 1938. In 1940 he set a European record at 14.0 and was awarded the Svenska Dagbladet Gold Medal. Lidman held the Swedish 110 m hurdles title in 1935–45 and 1947–1948. After retiring from competitions he served as director of the Swedish Athletics Association.
