= Seiichirō Furuta =

Japanese social reformer and educator

- 古田 誠一郎
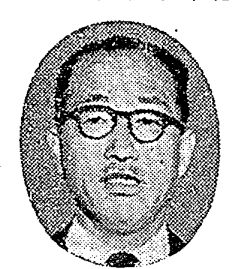
- Furuta in 1955

Mayor of Takatsuki
- In office 19 April 1947 – 8 February 1950
- Preceded by: Keikichi Nakai
- Succeeded by: Yasutarō Sakagami

Personal details
- Born: 27 June 1897 Wakayama, Japan
- Died: 3 December 1992 (aged 95)

Seiichirō Furuta (古田 誠一郎, Furuta Seiichirō; 27 June 1897 – 3 December 1992) was a Japanese social reformer, educator, radio and TV personality, and politician from Wakayama city, Wakayama Prefecture. One of the leaders of the Boy Scouts' early days in Japan and the first to be elected mayor of Takatsuki, Osaka, he served as the director of the Scout Association of Japan, as well as executive director of the Japan Camping Federation.

== Background ==
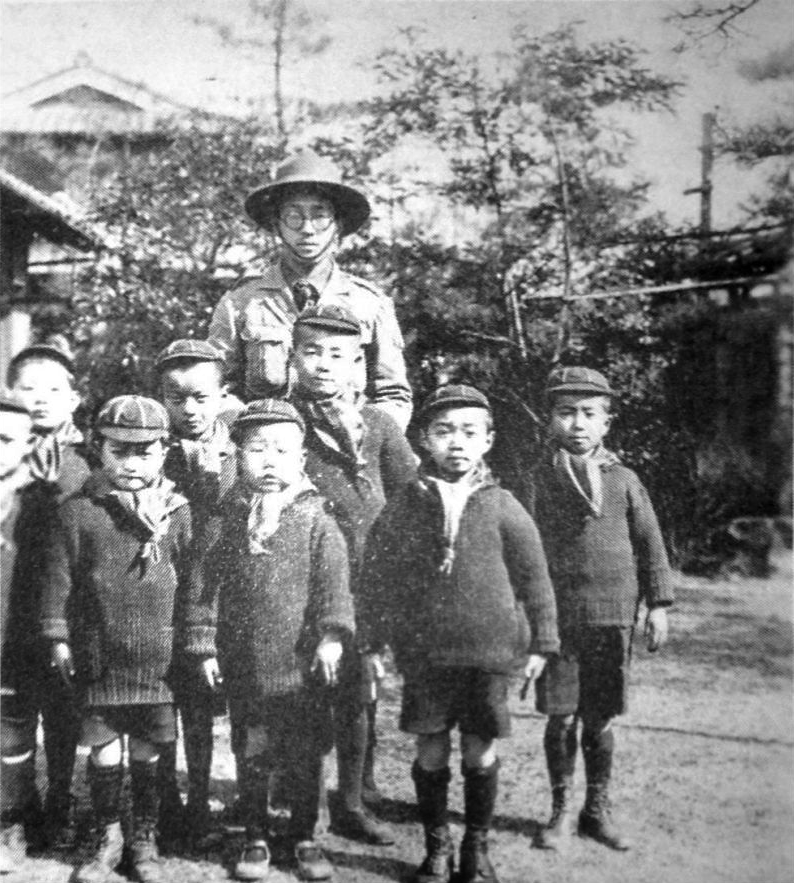
Seiichiro Furuta with Cub Scouts, c. 1924

In 1979 he received the highest distinction of the Scout Association of Japan, the Golden Pheasant Award.
