= Ted Best =

Australian sprinter (1917–1992)

Medal record

Men's athletics

Representing Australia

British Empire Games
Bronze medal – third place	1938 Sydney	100 yards
Bronze medal – third place	1938 Sydney	220 yards
Bronze medal – third place	1938 Sydney	4×110 yards

Edward Wallace Best (11 September 1917 – 1 June 1992) was an Australian athlete who competed in the third British Empire Games (forerunner of the modern Commonwealth Games), held in Sydney in February 1938. Best was Lord Mayor of Melbourne from 1969 to 1971.

At the 1938 Empire Games he won the bronze medal in the men's 100 yards event as well as in the 220 yards competition. He was also a member of the Australian relay team (along with Alf Watson, Teddy Hampson and Howard Yates) that won the bronze medal in the 4×110 yards contest.

Enlisting in the 2/22nd Battalion, Best was captured in New Britain (an island of New Guinea) by the Japanese in 1942. Photos held at the Australian War Memorial show him with other Allied prisoners of war at Zentsuji Camp at Shikoku, Osaka.

Educated at Wesley College, Melbourne, he was the son of AFL Fitzroy footballer Edward Best and was a nephew of politician Sir Robert Best.

Best died on 1 June 1992, aged 74, and was buried at the Anderson Creek Cemetery at Warrandyte. His wife Joan (née Ramsay), with whom he had been married for 52 years, was buried beside him upon her death in 2011.
