= Nobbie Ralph =

South African cricketer

Personal information
- Full name: Andrew Ronald MacKenzie Ralph
- Born: 26 April 1908; Mowbray, Cape Town, Cape Colony
- Died: 6 June 1992 (aged 84); Port Elizabeth, Cape Province, South Africa
- Nickname: Nobbie
- Batting: Right-handed
- Role: Batsman, occasional wicket-keeper

Domestic team information
- Years: Team
- 1931–32 to 1945–46: Western Province
- 1946–47: Griqualand West

Career statistics
Competition	First-class
Matches	34
Runs scored	2375
Batting average	53.97
100s/50s	6/16
Top score	142
Balls bowled	14
Wickets	0
Bowling average	–
5 wickets in innings	0
10 wickets in match	0
Best bowling	–
Catches/stumpings	26/3
- Source: Cricinfo, 17 January 2022

Andrew Ronald MacKenzie "Nobbie" Ralph (26 April 1908 – 6 June 1992) was a South African cricketer who played first-class cricket from 1931 to 1946, mostly for Western Province.

Ralph was one of the leading batsmen in the Currie Cup in 1936–37, with 517 runs in six matches at an average of 86.16. His highest first-class score was 142 against Border in December 1934, when he opened the batting and made the only century in the match, which Western Province won by an innings. He captained Western Province several times, taking over in 1939–40 when Pieter van der Bijl went off to fight in World War II.

Ralph served as convenor of the national cricket selectors in the 1950s.
