= Svend Aage Thomsen =

Danish hurdler

Personal information
- Nationality: Danish
- Born: 20 February 1911
- Died: 26 March 1961 (aged 50)

Sport
- Sport: Track and field
- Event: 110 metres hurdles

Svend Aage Thomsen (20 February 1911 – 26 March 1961) was a Danish hurdler. He competed in the men's 110 metres hurdles at the 1936 Summer Olympics. In 1943, he founded Den Jyske Idrætsskole, which in 1998 changed its name to Vejle Idrætshøjskole.
