= René Kunz =

Swiss hurdler

Personal information
- Nationality: Swiss
- Born: 28 January 1911
- Died: 18 September 2004 (aged 93)

Sport
- Sport: Track and field
- Event: 110 metres hurdles

René Kunz (28 January 1911 – 18 September 2004) was a Swiss hurdler. He competed in the men's 110 metres hurdles at the 1936 Summer Olympics.
