= Yasutarō Sakagami =

Japanese water polo player (1912–1984)

Yasutaro Sakagami
- 阪上 安太郎

Member of the House of Representatives
- In office 22 May 1958 – 15 November 1976
- Preceded by: Ryōji Inoue
- Succeeded by: Issei Inoue
- Constituency: Osaka 3rd

Mayor of Takatsuki
- In office 21 March 1950 – 20 March 1958
- Preceded by: Seiichirō Furuta
- Succeeded by: Sadajirō Suzuki

Personal details
- Born: 9 January 1912 Ibaraki, Osaka, Japan
- Died: 27 February 1984 (aged 72)
- Party: Socialist
- Education: Waseda University
- Water polo career
- Nationality: Japanese
- Sport: Water polo
National team
- Years: Team
- ?–?: Japan

Yasutarō Sakagami (阪上 安太郎, Sakagami Yasutarō; 9 January 1912 – 27 February 1984) was a Japanese male water polo player and politician. He was a member of the Japan men's national water polo team. He competed with the team at the 1932 Summer Olympics and 1936 Summer Olympics.
