= Lawrence Wallace =

English athlete and footballer

Medal record

Men's Athletics

Representing England

British Empire Games
| Silver medal – second place | 1938 Sydney | 4×110 yd |

Lawrence Mervyn Wallace (9 March 1917 – 1978) was an English amateur athlete who competed as a sprinter in the 1938 British Empire Games and played football for Southampton.

== Early life ==
Wallace was born in Sandown on the Isle of Wight and studied at Southampton's University College.

== Athletic career ==
At the 1938 Empire Games in ydney, Australia, he was a member of the English relay team which won the silver medal in the 4×110 yards relay event. In the 100 yards competition as well as in the 220 yards contest he was eliminated in the heats.

== Football career ==
Lawrence Wallace
Personal information
- Full name: Lawrence Mervyn Wallace
- Date of birth: 9 March 1917
- Place of birth: Sandown, England
- Date of death: 1978 (aged 60–61)
- Position: Outside left

Senior career*
| Years | Team | Apps | (Gls) |
| 1939 | Southampton | 1 | (0) |
- * Club domestic league appearances and goals

Wallace was selected to represent the Universities Athletic Union against an Amateur XI in a football match played at The Dell in February 1939. Wallace's abilities on the left-wing brought him to the attention of the Saints' management, who immediately signed him as an amateur.

He made his first-team debut at Maine Road against Manchester City on 18 March 1939, in place of Harry Osman, who had been sold to Millwall. Reports suggest that Wallace found his debut "somewhat overwhelming" and he "struggled to find any rhythm". Wallace returned to the reserves whilst continuing his education and made a few appearances for the reserves during the Second World War.
