= Yasuharu Furuta =

Japanese hurdler

Personal information
- Nationality: Japanese
- Born: 11 September 1914
- Died: 8 May 2008 (aged 93)

Sport
- Sport: Track and field
- Event: 110 metres hurdles

Yasuharu Furuta (古田 康治, Furuta Yasuharu; 11 September 1914 – 8 May 2008) was a Japanese hurdler, who competed in the men's 110 metres hurdles at the 1936 Summer Olympics. He later served as a member of the board of directors of the Japan Association of Athletics Federations.
