= John Mumford (athlete) =

Australian sprinter

Medal record

Men's athletics

Representing Australia

British Empire Games
Silver medal – second place	1938 Sydney	100 yd
Silver medal – second place	1938 Sydney	220 yd

John Mumford (12 April 1918 – 16 July 1999) was an Australian athlete who competed in the 1938 British Empire Games. At the 1938 Empire Games he won the silver medal in the 100 yards event as well as in the 220 yards competition. In the 440 yards contest he finished fourth.
