= Teddy Best =

Australian rules footballer

Personal information
- Full name: Edward Lewis Best
- Born: 4 May 1874; Collingwood, Victoria
- Died: 31 July 1957 (aged 83); Heidelberg, Victoria
- Original team: Fitzroy Lacrosse Club

Playing career^{1}
Years	Club	Games (Goals)
1902–03	Fitzroy	14 (0)
- ^{1} Playing statistics correct to the end of 1903.

Edward Lewis Best (4 May 1874 – 31 July 1957) was an Australian rules footballer who played with Fitzroy in the Victorian Football League (VFL).
