= Denis Shore =

South African sprinter

Medal record

Men's Athletics

Representing South Africa

British Empire Games
Bronze medal – third place	1938 Sydney	440 yards

Denis Victor Shore (24 May 1915 – 4 April 1963) was a South African athlete who competed in the 1936 Summer Olympics, the 1938 British Empire Games, and the 1948 Summer Olympics.

He was born in Johannesburg and died in Durban.

He won a gold medal in the 1935 Maccabiah Games, setting a Games record in the 100 m dash.

In 1936 he was eliminated in the second round of the Olympic 400 metre event. He was also a member of the South African relay team which was eliminated in the first round of the 4×400 metre relay competition.

Twelve years later he was eliminated in the second round of the 200 metre contest and in the semi-finals of the 400 metre event at the 1948 Olympics.

At the 1938 Empire Games he won the bronze medal in the 440 yards competition. In the 100 yards contest as well as in the 220 yards event he was eliminated in the semi-finals.

== Competition record ==
Year	Competition	Venue	Position	Event	Notes
Representing South Africa
1948	Olympics	London, England	5th, Qtr 2	200 m	
1948	Olympics	London, England	4th, Heat 2, SF	400 m	48.8
