= Cyril Holmes =

English sprinter (1915–1996)

Personal information
- Full name: Cyril Butler Holmes
- Born: 11 January 1915 Bolton, England
- Died: 21 June 1996 (aged 81) Bolton, England

Sport
- Sport: Athletics
- Event: 100/220 yards
- Club: Manchester Athletic Club
Medal record
Men's Athletics
Representing England
British Empire Games
Gold medal – first place	1938 Sydney	100 yd
Gold medal – first place	1938 Sydney	220 yd
Silver medal – second place	1938 Sydney	4×110 yd

Cyril Butler Holmes (11 January 1915 – 21 June 1996) was an English athlete who competed for Great Britain in the 1936 Summer Olympics. He was also capped three times for the England national rugby union team.

== Biography ==
Born in Bolton, Holmes was one of Britain's top sprinters in the late 1930s. He finished second behind Tinus Osendarp in the 100 yards event and second behind Arthur Sweeney in the 220 yards event at the 1936 AAA Championships. One month later he was selected to represent Great Britain at the 1936 Olympic Games held in Berlin, where he was eliminated in the quarter-finals of the 100 metres event at the 1936 Summer Olympics.

In 1937, he won the 1937 AAA Championships 100y in 9.9 seconds and both sprints at the World University Games.

Holmes represented England at the 1938 Empire Games, where he won the gold medal in the 100 yards contest in 9.7 seconds and in the 220 yards event in 21.2 seconds. He was also a member of the English relay team which won the silver medal in the 4×110 yards competition.

Holmes became the national 220 yards champion after winning the British AAA Championships title at the 1939 AAA Championships.

Personal Bests: 100y – 9.7 (1938); 100 – 10.5 (1939); 220y – 21.2 (1938).
