= Tom Lavery =

South African sprinter and hurdler

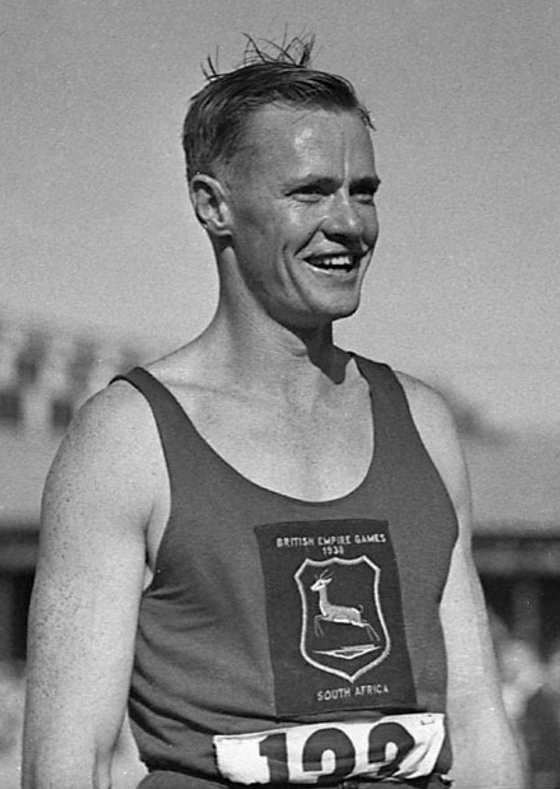
- Lavery at the 1938 British Empire Games

Personal information
- Born: 18 December 1911 Cowdenbeath, Scotland
- Died: 7 February 1987 (aged 75) Germiston, South Africa
- Height: 189 cm (6 ft 2 in)
- Weight: 82 kg (181 lb)

Sport
- Sport: Athletics
- Event: 110 m hurdles

Achievements and titles
- Personal best: 14.0 (1938)
Medal record
Representing South Africa
British Empire Games
Gold medal – first place	1938 Sydney	120 yd hurdles
Bronze medal – third place	1950 Auckland	120 yd hurdles

Thomas Patrick Lavery (18 December 1911 – 7 February 1987) was a South African sprinter and hurdler. He competed at the 1936 Summer Olympics 110 metre hurdles and 4×100 metre relay, but failed to reach the finals. At the 1938 Empire Games he won the gold medal in the 120 yard hurdles. In the 100 yard event he finished fourth. Twelve years later he won the bronze medal in the 120 yard hurdles at the 1950 Empire Games.
