= Ken Richardson (athlete) =

English athlete (1918–1998)

Personal information
- Nationality: English
- Born: 19 April 1918
- Died: 1988 (aged 69–70)
- Education: Bedford Modern School

Sport
- Sport: Athletics
Medal record
Men's Athletics
Representing England
British Empire Games
Silver medal – second place	1938 Sydney	4×110 yd

Kenneth John Richardson (19 April 1918 – 1998) was an English athlete who competed in the 1938 British Empire Games.

== Life ==
Kenneth John Richardson was born in Bedfordshire on 19 April 1918. He was educated at Bedford Modern School.

At the 1938 Empire Games he was also a member of the English relay team which won the silver medal in the 4×110 yards event. In the 100 yards competition as well as in the 220 yards contest he was eliminated in the heats.
