= Larry O'Connor (athlete) =

Canadian sprinter and hurdler

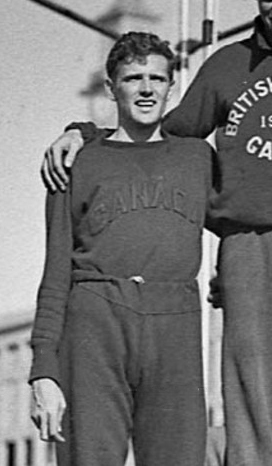
- O'Connor at the 1938 British Empire Games

Personal information
- Born: September 22, 1916 Cobourg, Ontario, Canada
- Died: September 6, 1995 (aged 78)
- Height: 181 cm (5 ft 11 in)
- Weight: 73 kg (161 lb)

Sport
- Sport: Athletics
- Events: Sprint, hurdles
- Club: Toronto West End YMCA

Achievements and titles
- Personal bests: 200 m – 21.4 (1938); 110 mH – 14.2 (1938)
Medal record
Representing Canada
British Empire Games
Gold medal – first place	1938 Sydney	4×110 yards
Silver medal – second place	1938 Sydney	120 yd hurdles

Lawrence Gerrard O'Connor (September 22, 1916 – September 6, 1995) was a Canadian sprinter and hurdler. He placed sixth in the 110 m hurdles at the 1936 Summer Olympics. At the 1938 Empire Games he was a member of the Canadian relay team that won the gold medal in the 4×110 yards event. In the 120 yards hurdles competition he won the bronze medal and in the 220 yards contest he finished fourth.
