= Howard Yates =

Australian sprinter

Medal record

Men's Athletics

British Empire Games
Bronze medal – third place	1938 Sydney	4×110 yards

Howard Spencer Yates (3 May 1913 – 8 November 1989) was an Australian athlete who competed in the 1934 British Empire Games and in the 1938 British Empire Games.

In 1934 he was a member of the Australian relay team which finished fourth in the 4×110 yards event. In the 100 yards competition he finished sixth and in the 220 yards contest he was eliminated in the semi-finals.

At the 1938 Empire Games he won the bronze medal with the Australian relay team in the 4×110 yards event. In the 220 yards competition he finished fifth and in the 100 yards contest he finished sixth again.
