= Ted Hampson (sprinter) =

Australian sprinter

Medal record

Men's athletics

Representing Australia

British Empire Games
Bronze medal – third place	1938 Sydney	4×110 yards

Thomas Edward Hampson (1 July 1910 – 19 July 1990) was an Australian athlete who competed in the 1938 British Empire Games.

At the 1938 Empire Games he was a member of the Australian relay team which won the bronze medal in the 4×110 yards event. In the 100 yards competition he finished fifth and in the 220 yards contest he was eliminated in the semi-finals.
