= New Zealand at the 1950 British Empire Games =

- CG code: NZL
- CGA: New Zealand Olympic and British Empire Games Association
- Website: www.olympic.org.nz

in Auckland, New Zealand
- Competitors: 175
- Flag bearers: Opening: Harold Nelson; Closing:
- Officials: 24
- Medals Ranked 3rd: Gold 10 Silver 22 Bronze 21 Total 53

British Empire Games appearances
- 1930; 1934; 1938; 1950; 1954; 1958; 1962; 1966; 1970; 1974; 1978; 1982; 1986; 1990; 1994; 1998; 2002; 2006; 2010; 2014; 2018; 2022; 2026; 2030

New Zealand at the 1950 British Empire Games was represented by a team of 175 competitors and 24 officials. Selection of the host nation's team for the Games in Auckland, was the responsibility of the New Zealand Olympic and British Empire Games Association. New Zealand's flagbearer at the opening ceremony was Harold Nelson. The New Zealand team finished third on the medal table, winning a total of 53 medals, 10 of which were gold.

New Zealand has competed in every games, starting with the British Empire Games in 1930 at Hamilton, Ontario.

== Medal tables ==
New Zealand was third in the medal table in 1950, with a total of 53 medals, including 10 gold.

Medal	Name	Sport	Event
Gold	Harold Nelson	Athletics	Men's 6 miles
Gold	Yvette Williams	Athletics	Women's long jump
Gold	Frank Creagh	Boxing	Men's heavyweight
Gold	James Pirret	Lawn bowls	Men's singles
Gold	Phil Exelby; Robert Henry	Lawn bowls	Men's pairs
Gold	Bill Carroll; Bill James; Ted Johnson; Colin Johnstone; John O'Brien	Rowing	Men's coxed four
Gold	Michael Amos; Lyall Barry; Noel Chambers; Buddy Lucas	Swimming	Men's 880 yards freestyle relay
Gold	Harold Cleghorn	Weightlifting	Men's heavyweight
Gold	Doug Mudgway	Wrestling	Men's bantamweight
Gold	John Armitt	Wrestling	Men's featherweight
Silver	June Schoch	Athletics	Women's 80 m hurdles
Silver	John Holland	Athletics	Men's 440 yards hurdles
Silver	Harold Nelson	Athletics	Men's 3 miles
Silver	Shirley Hardman; Dorothea Parker; Lesley Rowe	Athletics	Women's 440 yards relay
Silver	Bevin Hough	Athletics	Men's long jump
Silver	Yvette Williams	Athletics	Women's javelin throw
Silver	James Beal	Boxing	Men's middleweight
Silver	Christopher Rollinson	Boxing	Men's light heavyweight
Silver	Les Lock	Cycling	Men's 10 mile scratch race
Silver	Nick Carter	Cycling	Men's road race
Silver	Patricia Woodroffe	Fencing	Women's individual foil
Silver	Charles Dearing; Austen Gittos; Murray Gittos; Nathaniel Millar	Fencing	Men's foil team
Silver	Joseph Schneider; Desmond Simonson	Rowing	Men's double scull
Silver	David Gould; Humphrey Gould	Rowing	Men's coxless pair
Silver	Don Adam; Kerry Ashby; Murray Ashby; Bruce Culpan; Thomas Engel; Grahame Jarratt; Don Rowlands; Edwin Smith; Bill Tinnock	Rowing	Men's eight
Silver	Jean Stewart	Swimming	Women's 110 yards backstroke
Silver	Norma Bridson; Winifred Griffin; Joan Hastings; Kristin Jacobi	Swimming	Women's 440 yards freestyle relay
Silver	New Zealand men's water polo team: Charles Brown; Jim Cameron; Terry Harris; Bob Hatchwell; Barrie Hutchinson; Tom Logan; Edward Raven; Jim Walsh; Neil Williams; Wally Williams	Water polo	Men's tournament
Silver	Tony George	Weightlifting	Men's middleweight
Silver	Eric Matthews	Wrestling	Men's flyweight
Silver	Arthur Sneddon	Wrestling	Men's light heavyweight
Silver	Pat O'Connor	Wrestling	Men's heavyweight
Bronze	Janet Shackleton	Athletics	Women's 80 m hurdles
Bronze	Don Jowett	Athletics	Men's 220 yards
Bronze	Dave Batten	Athletics	Men's 440 yards
Bronze	Maurice Marshall	Athletics	Men's mile
Bronze	Noel Taylor	Athletics	Men's 6 miles
Bronze	Jack Clarke	Athletics	Men's marathon
Bronze	Kevin Beardsley; Arthur Eustace; Peter Henderson; Clem Parker	Athletics	Men's 4 x 110 yards relay
Bronze	Dave Batten; John Holland; Derek Steward; Jack Sutherland	Athletics	Men's 4 x 440 yards relay
Bronze	Noelene Swinton	Athletics	Women's high jump
Bronze	Cleone Rivett-Carnac	Athletics	Women's javelin throw
Bronze	Dave Dephoff	Athletics	Men's long jump
Bronze	Ruth Dowman	Athletics	Women's long jump
Bronze	Jim Barnden	Boxing	Men's lightweight
Bronze	Graham Avery	Cycling	Men's sprint
Bronze	Les Lock	Cycling	Men's 4000 m individual pursuit
Bronze	Jack Stewart	Diving	Men's 3 m springboard
Bronze	Arthur Engebretsen; Noel Jolly; Fred Russell; Pete Skoglund	Lawn bowls	Men's fours
Bronze	Buddy Lucas	Swimming	Men's 440 yards freestyle
Bronze	Buddy Lucas	Swimming	Men's 1650 yards freestyle
Bronze	Lyall Barry; Peter Mathieson; John Shanahan	Swimming	Men's 330 yards medlay relay
Bronze	Gordon Hobson	Wrestling	Men's lightweight

Medals by sport
Sport	Gold medal	Silver medal	Bronze medal	Total
Athletics	2	6	12	20
Wrestling	2	3	1	6
Lawn bowls	2	0	1	3
Rowing	1	3	0	4
Swimming	1	2	3	6
Boxing	1	2	1	4
Weightlifting	1	1	0	2
Cycling	0	2	2	4
Fencing	0	2	0	2
Water polo	0	1	0	1
Diving	0	0	1	1
Total	10	22	21	53

Medals by gender
Gender	Gold medal	Silver medal	Bronze medal	Total
Male	9	16	17	42
Female	1	6	4	11
Total	10	22	21	53

== Competitors ==
The following table lists the number of New Zealand competitors participating at the Games according to gender and sport.

Sport	Men	Women	Total
Athletics	50	14	64
Boxing	8	—N/a	8
Cycling	11	—N/a	11
Diving	2	3	5
Fencing	14	3	17
Lawn bowls	7	—N/a	7
Rowing	19	—N/a	19
Swimming	11	7	18
Water polo	10	—N/a	10
Weightlifting	5	—N/a	5
Wrestling	8	—N/a	8
Total	143	27	170

== Athletics ==
=== Men ===
==== Track and road ====
Athlete	Event	Heat		Semifinal		Final	
Athlete	Event	Result	Rank (Note: Ranks given are within the heat)	Result	Rank (Note: Ranks given are within the semifinal)	Result	Rank
Neil Bates	1 mile	4:25.8	6	—N/a		did not advance	
Dave Batten	220 yards	22.4	1 Q	22.2	4	did not advance	
Dave Batten	440 yards	48.9	3 Q	48.9	3 Q	48.8	3rd place, bronze medalist(s)
Kevin Beardsley	100 yards	10.2	3 Q	10.2	6	did not advance	
Gordon Bromley	Marathon	—N/a				2:46:51.0	7
Jack Clarke	Marathon	—N/a				2:39:26.7	3rd place, bronze medalist(s)
Arthur Eustace	100 yards	9.9	2 Q	10.1	6	did not advance	
Lionel Fox	Marathon	—N/a				2:57:47.2	13
Doug Harris	440 yards	DNS		did not advance			
Doug Harris	880 yards	DNF		—N/a		did not advance	
Peter Henderson	100 yards	9.9	1 Q	9.9	2 Q	9.9	5
Allen Hill	120 yards hurdles		4	—N/a		did not advance	
Allen Hill	440 yards hurdles		4	did not advance			
John Holland	120 yards hurdles	15.1	3 Q	—N/a		15.1	5
John Holland	440 yards hurdles	53.0	1 Q	53.4	1 Q	52.7	2nd place, silver medalist(s)
George Hoskins	3 miles	—N/a					12
George Hoskins	6 miles	—N/a				DNS	
Don Jowett	220 yards	22.4	1 Q	22.9	2 Q	21.8	3rd place, bronze medalist(s)
Colin Lousich	3 miles	—N/a				14:41.0	6
Colin Lousich	6 miles	—N/a				DNF	
Arthur Lydiard	Marathon	—N/a				2:54:51.6	12
Maurice Marshall	1 mile	4:16.8	4 Q	—N/a		4:13.2	3rd place, bronze medalist(s)
John Myles	440 yards		3 Q		5	did not advance	
Harold Nelson	3 miles	—N/a				14:27.8	2nd place, silver medalist(s)
Harold Nelson	6 miles	—N/a				30:29.6	1st place, gold medalist(s)
Clem Parker	100 yards	10.0	2 Q	9.9	3 Q	10.0	6
Clem Parker	220 yards	22.6	2 Q	22.0	3 Q	22.2	6
Cliff Simpson	880 yards		4 Q	—N/a		1:56.0	6
Cliff Simpson	1 mile	4:26.6	6	—N/a		did not advance	
Jack Sinclair	1 mile	4:19.8	3 Q	—N/a		4:20.0	6
Lionel Smith	120 yards hurdles	14.8	3 Q	—N/a			6
Barry Steel	880 yards		6	—N/a		did not advance	
Derek Steward	440 yards hurdles	54.4	1 Q		4	did not advance	
Jack Sutherland	440 yards	50.0	3 Q	49.2	1 Q		6
Noel Taylor	3 miles	—N/a					11
Noel Taylor	6 miles	—N/a				30:31.9	3rd place, bronze medalist(s)
Neil Wilson	880 yards	1:53.2	2 Q	—N/a		1:53.7	4
Clem Parker; Arthur Eustace; Peter Henderson; Kevin Beardsley	4 x 110 yards relay	—N/a				42.6	3rd place, bronze medalist(s)
Dave Batten; Jack Sutherland; Derek Steward; John Holland	4 x 440 yards relay	—N/a				3:20.0	3rd place, bronze medalist(s)

==== Field ====
Athlete	Event	Final	
Athlete	Event	Result	Rank
Johnny Borland	High jump	6 ft 5 in (1.96 m)	4
Johnny Brown	Hammer throw	135 ft 3 1/2 in (41.24 m)	9
Max Carr	Discus throw	126 ft 8 3/4 in (38.63 m)	8
Max Carr	Hammer throw	140 ft 6 3/4 in (42.84 m)	6
Claude Clegg	Javelin throw	175 ft 11 in (53.62 m)	5
Dave Dephoff	Long jump	23 ft 3 in (7.09 m)	3rd place, bronze medalist(s)
Keith Forsythe	Long jump	23 ft 3 in (7.09 m)	4
Keith Forsythe	Triple jump	46 ft 7 3/4 in (14.22 m)	5
Arthur Fuller	Hammer throw	143 ft 2 1/2 in (43.65 m)	5
Doug Herman	Shot put	44 ft 0 in (13.41 m)	4
Wallace Heron	Pole vault	12 ft 9 in (3.89 m)	4
Bevin Hough	Long jump	23 ft 7 3/8 in (7.20 m)	2nd place, silver medalist(s)
Graham Jeffries	Triple jump	46 ft 2 3/4 in (14.09 m)	6
Roy Johnson	Triple jump	47 ft 7 1/2 in (14.52 m)	4
Colin Kay	Triple jump	45 ft 7 3/4 in (13.91 m)	9
Stan Lay	Javelin throw	175 ft 4 in (53.44 m)	6
Jim Leckie	Hammer throw	136 ft 6 in (41.61 m)	7
Clyde Main	Shot put	41 ft 4 in (12.60 m)	6
George Martin	Pole vault	12 ft 3 in (3.73 m)	6
Raymond McKenzie	High jump	6 ft 0 in (1.83 m)	11
Keith Morgan	Shot put	43 ft 10 in (13.36 m)	5
Gus Redmond	Discus throw	132 ft 8 3/4 in (40.46 m)	5
Eric Rhodes	High jump	5 ft 9 in (1.75 m)	14
Merv Richards	Pole vault	12 ft 3 in (3.73 m)	8
Roy Woolley	High jump	5 ft 9 in (1.75 m)	14

=== Women ===
==== Track ====
Athlete	Event	Heat		Semifinal		Final	
Athlete	Event	Result	Rank (Note: Ranks given are within the heat)	Result	Rank (Note: Ranks given are within the semifinal)	Result	Rank
Ruth Dowman	100 yards	11.2	2 Q	11.3	4	did not advance	
Pixie Fletcher	80 m hurdles	11.9	2 Q	—N/a			5
Noeline Gourley	80 m hurdles	11.5	1 Q	—N/a		11.9	4
Shirley Hardman	100 yards	11.2	2 Q	11.2	3 Q	11.3	5
Joan Hart	220 yards	25.9	3 Q		5	did not advance	
Colleen Malone	100 yards	11.6	3 Q	11.6	5	did not advance	
Colleen Malone	220 yards		5	did not advance			
Dorothea Parker	100 yards	11.2	3 Q	11.2	3 Q	11.2	4
Dorothea Parker	220 yards	25.4	2 Q	25.1	3 Q	24.8	4
Lesley Rowe	220 yards	25.5	3 Q	25.8	3 Q		6
June Schoch	80 m hurdles	11.4	2 Q	—N/a		11.6	2nd place, silver medalist(s)
Janet Shackleton	80 m hurdles	11.4	3 Q	—N/a		11.7	3rd place, bronze medalist(s)
Lesley Rowe; Shirley Hardman; Dorothea Parker	440 yards relay	—N/a				48.7	2nd place, silver medalist(s)
Ruth Dowman; Dorothea Parker; Lesley Rowe; Shirley Hardman	660 yards relay	—N/a				DQ	

==== Field ====
Athlete	Event	Final	
Athlete	Event	Result	Rank
Bev Brewis	High jump	4 ft 10 in (1.47 m)	5
Ruth Dowman	Long jump	18 ft 10 in (5.74 m)	3rd place, bronze medalist(s)
Cleone Rivett-Carnac	Javelin throw	112 ft 11 3/4 in (34.44 m)	3rd place, bronze medalist(s)
June Schoch	Long jump	15 ft 3 3/4 in (4.67 m)	11
Noelene Swinton	High jump	5 ft 1 in (1.55 m)	3rd place, bronze medalist(s)
Yvette Williams	Javelin throw	124 ft 6 3/4 in (37.97 m)	2nd place, silver medalist(s)
Yvette Williams	Long jump	19 ft 4 5/8 in (5.91 m) GR	1st place, gold medalist(s)

== Boxing ==
Athlete	Event	Quarter Final	Semi Final	Final / BM	Rank
Athlete	Event	Opposition Result	Opposition Result	Opposition Result	Rank
Bert Maddern	Flyweight	Edwin (CEY); L	did not advance		
Robert Broadhurst	Bantamweight	Walters (CAN); L	did not advance		
William Paterson	Featherweight	Brander (ENG); L	did not advance		
Jim Barnden	Lightweight	King (SRH); W	Barber (AUS); L	Weighed over	4
Jimmy McIvor	Welterweight	Small (SRH); W	Ratcliffe (ENG); L	Withdrew unfit	4
James Beal	Middleweight	—N/a	Bye	van Schalkwyk (SAF); L	2nd place, silver medalist(s)
Christopher Rollinson	Light heavyweight	—N/a	Bye	Scott (ENG); L	2nd place, silver medalist(s)
Frank Creagh	Heavyweight	—N/a		Cousins (AUS); W	1st place, gold medalist(s)

== Cycling ==
=== Road ===
Men's road race

Athlete	Time	Rank
Nick Carter	3:13:06.5	2nd place, silver medalist(s)
James Downie	3:13:12.7	7
Ted Lambert	DNF	

=== Track ===
Men's 1000 m sprint

Athlete	Round 1	Repechage	Quarterfinals	Semifinals	Final / BM	
Athlete	Opposition Time	Opposition Time	Opposition Time	Opposition Time	Opposition Time	Rank
Graham Avery	Oland (CAN); W 12.8	—N/a	Bazzano (AUS); W 12.9, W 13.0	Patterson (AUS); L, L	Olive (NZL); W 12.8, L, W 13.2	3rd place, bronze medalist(s)
Don Olive	Evans (SRH); Millman (CAN); W 12.9	—N/a	Godwin (ENG); W 12.8, W 12.8	Mockridge (AUS); L, L	Avery (NZL); L, W 12.6, L	4
Allen Stonex	Mockridge (AUS); L	Millman (CAN); W 14.2	Patterson (AUS); L, L	did not advance		

Men's 1 km time trial

Athlete	Time	Rank
Graham Hughes	1:17.1	8
Les Lock	1:16.2	5
Malcolm Simpson	1:16.5	=6

Men's 4000 m individual pursuit

Athlete	Round 1	Semifinals	Final / BM	
Athlete	Opposition Time	Opposition Time	Opposition Time	Rank
Les Lock	Hamilton (SCO); L 5:29.6 (Note: Qualified for the semifinals as the fastest loser)	Cartwright (ENG); L	Hamilton (SCO); W 5:26.7	3rd place, bronze medalist(s)

Men's 10 miles track race

Athlete	Time	Rank
Alan Dean	DNF	
Les Lock		2nd place, silver medalist(s)
Frank Tredrea		unplaced

== Diving ==
Athlete	Event	Points	Rank
Joyce Carpenter	Women's 3 m springboard	95.88	7
Owen Jaine	Men's 10 m platform	115.28	6
Betty Moore	Women's 3 m springboard	93.30	8
Mayzod Reid	Women's 3 m springboard	104.29	6
Jack Stewart	Men's 3 m springboard	168.17	3rd place, bronze medalist(s)

== Fencing ==
=== Men ===
Individual épée

Athlete	Elimination pool						Final pool						Rank
Athlete	Opposition Result	Opposition Result	Opposition Result	Opposition Result	Opposition Result	Opposition Result	Opposition Result	Opposition Result	Opposition Result	Opposition Result	Opposition Result	Opposition Result	Rank
Stephen Elsom	Paul (ENG); L 0 – 3	Pouliot (CAN); L 2 – 3	Lund (AUS); L 0 – 3	Jay (AUS); L 0 – 3	Brooke (CAN); L 0 – 3	Usher (SCO); L 2 – 3	did not advance						
J. Shaw	Ward (NZL); L 1 – 3	Anderson (ENG); W 3 – 1	Gibson (AUS); L 0 – 3	de Beaumont (ENG); L 1 – 3	Desjarlais (CAN); L 0 – 3	—N/a	did not advance						
Joseph Ward	Shaw (NZL); W 3 – 1	Desjarlais (CAN); L 2 – 3	de Beaumont (ENG); L 2 – 3	Anderson (ENG); W 3 – 2	Gibson (AUS); W 3 – 1	—N/a	Lund (AUS); L 2 – 3	Desjarlais (CAN); W 3 – 2	Anderson (ENG); W 3 – 2	de Beaumont (ENG); L 1 – 3	Paul (ENG); L 1 – 3	Jay (AUS); L 1 – 3	=6

Individual foil

Athlete	Elimination pool					Final pool							Rank
Athlete	Opposition Result	Opposition Result	Opposition Result	Opposition Result	Opposition Result	Opposition Result	Opposition Result	Opposition Result	Opposition Result	Opposition Result	Opposition Result	Opposition Result	Rank
Charles Dearing	M. Gittos (NZL); L 4 – 5	Anderson (ENG); L 0 – 5	Desjarlais (CAN); L 3 – 5	Dean (AUS); W 5 – 3	Pilbrow (ENG); L 3 – 5	did not advance							
Austen Gittos	Paul (ENG); L 3 – 5	Pouliot (CAN); L 2 – 5	Fethers (AUS); L 2 – 5	Brooke (CAN); L 2 – 5	Jay (AUS); W 5 – 4	M. Gittos (NZL); W 5 – 3	Desjarlais (CAN); L 3 – 5	Paul (ENG); L 2 – 5	Pilbrow (ENG); W 5 – 1	Pouliot (CAN); W 5 – 2	Fethers (AUS); L 1 – 5	Anderson (ENG); W 5 – 3	4
Murray Gittos	Dearing (NZL); W 5 – 4	Dean (AUS); W 5 – 3	Pilbrow (ENG); W 5 – 3	Desjarlais (CAN); W 5 – 3	Anderson (ENG); L 2 – 5	A. Gittos (NZL); L 3 – 5	Fethers (AUS); L 3 – 5	Anderson (ENG); W 5 – 3	Pouliot (CAN); L 2 – 5	Pilbrow (ENG); L 3 – 5	Paul (ENG); L 2 – 5	Desjarlais (CAN); L 3 – 5	8

Individual sabre

Athlete	Elimination pool					Final pool							Rank
Athlete	Opposition Result	Opposition Result	Opposition Result	Opposition Result	Opposition Result	Opposition Result	Opposition Result	Opposition Result	Opposition Result	Opposition Result	Opposition Result	Opposition Result	Rank
Trevor Hadley	Anderson (ENG); L 1 – 5	Pouliot (CAN); L 1 – 5	Gibson (AUS); L 2 – 5	Brooke (CAN); L 1 – 5	Jay (AUS); L 3 – 5	did not advance							
Julius Stafford	Wright (NZL); L 3 – 5	Paul (ENG); L 0 – 5	Desjarlais (CAN); L 3 – 5	Pilbrow (ENG); L 1 – 5	Dean (AUS); W 5 – 4	did not advance							
Dudley Wright	Stafford (NZL); W 5 – 3	Dean (AUS); W 5 – 1	Pilbrow (ENG); L 3 – 5	Paul (ENG); L 4 – 5	Desjarlais (CAN); W 5 – 2	Gibson (AUS); L 4 – 5	Paul (ENG); W 5 – 3	Brooke (CAN); W 5 – 2	Desjarlais (CAN); W 5 – 2	Anderson (ENG); L 0 – 5	Pouliot (CAN); L 1 – 5	Pilbrow (ENG); L 3 – 5	=4

Team épée

Athlete	Round robin			Rank
Athlete	Round 1	Round 2	Round 3	Rank
Eric Cox; Stephen Elsom; J.H. Malcolm; J. Shaw; Joseph Ward	Canada	England	Australia	4
Eric Cox; Stephen Elsom; J.H. Malcolm; J. Shaw; Joseph Ward	Cox v Brooke L 0 – 3 v Pouliot L 1 – 3 v Desjarlais L 1 – 3	Elsom v de Beaumont L 2 – 3 v Paul L 0 – 3 v Anderson W 3 – 2	Elsom v Jay L 0 – 3 v Lund L 0 – 3 v Stanmore L 2 – 3	4
Eric Cox; Stephen Elsom; J.H. Malcolm; J. Shaw; Joseph Ward	Elsom v Desjarlais L 2 – 3 v Brooke L 1 – 3 v Pouliot L 0 – 3	Shaw v Anderson W 3 – 1 v de Beaumont L 1 – 3 v Paul W 3 – 0	Shaw v Jay W 3 – 2 v Lund L 2 – 3 v Stanmore W 3 – 0	4
Eric Cox; Stephen Elsom; J.H. Malcolm; J. Shaw; Joseph Ward	Malcolm v Pouliot L 2 – 3 v Desjarlais D 3 – 3 v Brooke L 1 – 3	Malcolm v Paul L 1 – 3 v Anderson L 1 – 3 v de Beaumont L 0 – 3	Ward v Jay W 3 – 1 v Lund W 3 – 2 v Stanmore L 2 – 3	4
Eric Cox; Stephen Elsom; J.H. Malcolm; J. Shaw; Joseph Ward	Result; L 0 – 8	Result; L 3 – 6	Result; L 4 – 5	4

Team foil

Athlete	Round robin			Rank
Athlete	Round 1	Round 2	Round 3	Rank
Charles Dearing; Austen Gittos; Murray Gittos; Nathaniel Millar	Canada	Australia	England	2nd place, silver medalist(s)
Charles Dearing; Austen Gittos; Murray Gittos; Nathaniel Millar	Dearing v Desjarlais W 5 – 2 v Pouliot L 1 – 5 v Brooke W 5 – 4			2nd place, silver medalist(s)
Charles Dearing; Austen Gittos; Murray Gittos; Nathaniel Millar	A. Gittos v Desjarlais W 5 – 0 v Pouliot L 1 – 5 v Brooke W 5 – 1			2nd place, silver medalist(s)
Charles Dearing; Austen Gittos; Murray Gittos; Nathaniel Millar	M. Gittos v Desjarlais L 4 – 5 v Pouliot W 5 – 2 v Brooke W 5 – 2			2nd place, silver medalist(s)
Charles Dearing; Austen Gittos; Murray Gittos; Nathaniel Millar	Result; W 6 – 3	Result; L 4 – 5	Result; L 3 – 6	2nd place, silver medalist(s)

Team sabre

Athlete	Round robin			Rank
Athlete	Round 1	Round 2	Round 3	Rank
Eric Flaws; Trevor Hadley; Allan McLeavey; Julius Stafford; Dudley Wright	Australia	Canada	England	4
Eric Flaws; Trevor Hadley; Allan McLeavey; Julius Stafford; Dudley Wright	Hadley v Booth v Chillug v Dean; 1 win, 2 losses	Hadley v Brooke L v Pouliot L v Desjarlais L	Flaws v de Beaumont L 1 – 5 v Pilbrow L 1 – 5 v Anderson L 4 – 5	4
Eric Flaws; Trevor Hadley; Allan McLeavey; Julius Stafford; Dudley Wright	McLeavey v Booth L v Chillug L v Dean L	Stafford v Brooke L v Pouliot L v Desjarlais L	McLeavey v Pilbrow L 1 – 5 v Anderson L 2 – 5 v de Beaumont W 5 – 3	4
Eric Flaws; Trevor Hadley; Allan McLeavey; Julius Stafford; Dudley Wright	Wright v Booth v Chillug v Dean; 2 wins, 1 loss	Wright v Brooke W v Pouliot W v Desjarlais W	Stafford v Anderson L 1 – 5 v de Beaumont L 0 – 5 v Pilbrow L 2 – 5	4
Eric Flaws; Trevor Hadley; Allan McLeavey; Julius Stafford; Dudley Wright	Result; L 3 – 6	Result; L 3 – 6	Result; L 1 – 8	4

=== Women ===
Individual foil

Athlete	Final pool							Rank
Athlete	Opposition Result	Opposition Result	Opposition Result	Opposition Result	Opposition Result	Opposition Result	Opposition Result	Rank
Florence Andrews	Pym (AUS); L 3 – 4	Glen-Haig (ENG); L 1 – 4	Stokes (AUS); L 2 – 4	Wilson (AUS); W 4 – 2	Hamilton (CAN); L 1 – 4	Woodroffe (NZL); L 0 – 4	Jekyll (NZL); W 4 – 1	6
Olga Jekyll	Hamilton (CAN); W 4 – 0	Wilson (AUS); W 4 – 2	Pym (AUS); L 2 – 4	Glen-Haig (ENG); L 2 – 4	Stokes (AUS); W 4 – 3	Woodroffe (NZL); L 2 – 4	Andrews (NZL); L 1 – 4	5
Patricia Woodroffe	Wilson (AUS); W 4 – 1	Hamilton (CAN); W 4 – 0	Glen-Haig (ENG); L 2 – 4	Stokes (AUS); W 4 – 1	Pym (AUS); W 4 – 2	Jekyll (NZL); W 4 – 2	Andrews (NZL); W 4 – 0	2nd place, silver medalist(s)

== Lawn bowls ==
Athlete	Event	Round robin				Eliminator	Final	Rank
Athlete	Event	Opposition Score	Opposition Score	Opposition Score	Opposition Score	Opposition Score	Opposition Score	Rank
James Pirret	Men's singles	Garnett (FIJ); W 25 – 20	Krupp (CAN); W 25 – 22	Newton (AUS); W 26 – 12	Jacobs (SAF); W 25 – 10	—N/a		1st place, gold medalist(s)
Robert Henry; Phil Exelby	Men's pairs	South Africa; W 23 – 16	Australia; W 23 – 22	Fiji; W 47 – 4	—N/a	—N/a		1st place, gold medalist(s)
Arthur Engebretsen; Fred Russell; Noel Jolly; Pete Skoglund	Men's fours	South Africa; W 19 – 11	Australia; L 14 – 23	Fiji; W 41 – 6	—N/a	South Africa; L 17 – 22	Did not advance	3rd place, bronze medalist(s)

== Rowing ==
Athlete	Event	Time	Rank
Tristan Hegglun	Men's single sculls		4
Joe Schneider; Des Simonson	Men's double sculls	7:32.0	2nd place, silver medalist(s)
David Gould; Humphrey Gould	Men's coxless pair	8:10.0	2nd place, silver medalist(s)
Ted Johnson; John O'Brien; Bill James; Bill Carroll; Colin Johnstone (cox)	Men's coxed four	7:17.2	1st place, gold medalist(s)
Thomas Engel; Kerry Ashby; Bill Tinnock; Murray Ashby; Grahame Jarratt; Don Rowlands; Bruce Culpan; Edwin Smith; Don Adam (cox)	Men's eight	6:27.5	2nd place, silver medalist(s)

== Swimming ==
=== Men ===
Athlete	Event	Heat		Final	
Athlete	Event	Result	Rank	Result	Rank
Michael Amos	110 yards freestyle	1:01.9	6 Q	1:02.5	6
Michael Amos	440 yards freestyle	5:06.1	6 Q	5:08.1	5
Lyall Barry	110 yards freestyle	1:03.2	=8	did not advance	
Colin Callan	220 yards breaststroke	3:05.7	6 Q	3:09.8	6
Colin Chambers	1650 yards freestyle	21:46.6	6 Q	21:45.3	6
Noel Chambers	440 yards freestyle	5:14.1	10	did not advance	
Trevor Eagle	220 yards breaststroke	3:01.4	5 Q	3:02.9	5
Roger Gibbs	110 yards backstroke	1:18.7	9	did not advance	
Peter Hanan	110 yards freestyle	1:04.4	10	did not advance	
Buddy Lucas	440 yards freestyle	4:48.9	2 Q	5:02.5	3rd place, bronze medalist(s)
Buddy Lucas	1650 yards freestyle	20:11.2	1 Q	20:10.1	3rd place, bronze medalist(s)
Peter Mathieson	110 yards backstroke	1:13.7	5	1:13.6	4
John Shanahan	220 yards breaststroke	2:57.4	3 Q	2:59.8	4
Peter Mathieson; John Shanahan; Lyall Barry	3 x 110 yards medley relay	—N/a		3:30.1	3rd place, bronze medalist(s)
Lyall Barry; Buddy Lucas; Noel Chambers; Michael Amos	4 x 220 yards freestyle relay	—N/a		9:27.7	1st place, gold medalist(s)

=== Women ===
Athlete	Event	Heat		Final	
Athlete	Event	Result	Rank	Result	Rank
Norma Bridson	110 yards freestyle	1:11.0	4 Q	1:11.2	5
Winifred Griffin	110 yards freestyle	1:10.1	2 Q	1:11.9	6
Winifred Griffin	440 yards freestyle	5:38.4	3 Q	5:39.4	4
Kristin Jacobi	110 yards freestyle	1:13.4	11	did not advance	
Helen Mackenzie	440 yards freestyle	5:47.6	8	did not advance	
Jean Stewart	110 yards backstroke	1:18.6 GR	1 Q	1:19.1	2nd place, silver medalist(s)
Margaret Sweeney	220 yards breaststroke	—N/a		3:28.2	6
Jean Stewart; Margaret Sweeney; Winifred Griffin	3 x 110 yards medley relay	—N/a		DQ	
Kristin Jacobi; Norma Bridson; Winifred Griffin; Joan Hastings	4 x 110 yards freestyle relay	—N/a		4:48.7	2nd place, silver medalist(s)

== Water polo ==
Team roster

Charles Brown, Jim Cameron, Terry Harris, Bob Hatchwell, Barrie Hutchinson, Tom Logan (c), Edward Raven, Jim Walsh, Neil Williams, Wally Williams

Game 1

4 February 1950	New Zealand	4–11	Australia	Newmarket Olympic Pool
4 February 1950	Hatchwell 2, Logan, W. Williams	Goals	Amadee 4, Johnston 2, French, Bennett, Doerner, Hastie, own goal	Newmarket Olympic Pool

Game 2

6 February 1950	New Zealand	2–13	Australia	Newmarket Olympic Pool
6 February 1950		Goals	Amadee 4, Bennett 5, Johnston 2, Hastie 2	Newmarket Olympic Pool

Game 3

10 February 1950	New Zealand	2–5	Australia	Newmarket Olympic Pool
10 February 1950		Goals		Newmarket Olympic Pool

Final standings

Team	Pld	W	D	L	GF	GA	GD	Rank
Australia	3	3	0	0	29	8	+21	1st place, gold medalist(s)
New Zealand	3	0	0	3	8	29	-21	2nd place, silver medalist(s)

== Weightlifting ==
Athlete	Event	Press	Snatch	Jerk	Total	Rank
Lewis Lawn	Featherweight				540 lb (244.9 kg)	6
Edwin Norton	Lightweight	200 lb (90.7 kg)	195 lb (88.5 kg)	250 lb (113.4 kg)	645 lb (292.6 kg)	4
Tony George	Middleweight	235 lb (106.6 kg)	225 lb (102.1 kg)	280 lb (127.0 kg)	740 lb (335.7 kg)	2nd place, silver medalist(s)
Trevor Clark	Light heavyweight	225 lb (102.1 kg)	225 lb (102.1 kg)	280 lb (127.0 kg)	730 lb (331.1 kg)	4
Harold Cleghorn	Heavyweight	285 lb (129.3 kg)	270 lb (122.5 kg)	345 lb (156.5 kg)	900 lb (408.2 kg)	1st place, gold medalist(s)

== Wrestling ==
Athlete	Event	Elimination rounds			Final	Rank
Athlete	Event	Opposition Result	Opposition Result	Opposition Result	Opposition Result	Rank
Eric Matthews	Flyweight	—N/a			Harris (AUS); L	2nd place, silver medalist(s)
Doug Mudgway	Bantamweight	—N/a			Chapman (AUS); W	1st place, gold medalist(s)
John Armitt	Featherweight	Parsons (ENG); W	Hayman (AUS); W	—N/a	Milord (CAN); W	1st place, gold medalist(s)
Gordon Hobson	Lightweight	Dick Garrard (AUS); L	Plumb (CAN); L	Eliminated		3rd place, bronze medalist(s)
Jack Monaghan	Welterweight	Little (AUS); L	Hudson (CAN); L	Eliminated		
Peter Fletcher	Middleweight	Vachon (CAN); L	Bowey (ENG); W	Arthur (AUS); L	Eliminated	
Arthur Sneddon	Light heavyweight	—N/a	Trevaskis (AUS); W	—N/a	Morton (SAF); L	2nd place, silver medalist(s)
Pat O'Connor	Heavyweight	Armstrong (AUS); L	Ovendon (CAN); W	Richmond (ENG); W	—N/a	2nd place, silver medalist(s)

== Officials ==
- Team manager – Bill Holley
- Athletics
  - Manager – Jim Barnes
  - Chaperone – Pearl Ellis
  - Coach – Frank Sharpley
  - Masseurs – J. Meek, W. N. Connell
- Boxing
  - Manager – K. A. Neale
  - Trainer – Richard Dunn
  - Masseur – A. G. Bates
- Cycling manager – Cliff Chainey
- Fencing manager – T. H. Wilson
- Lawn bowls manager – J. R. Smith
- Rowing masseur – C. G. Fearon
- Swimming
  - Manager – Len Moorhouse
  - Chaperone – Winifred Bridson
  - Coach – D. F. Watson
- Weightlifting manager / coach – C. S. McDonald
- Wrestling
  - Manager – J. W. Steele
  - Coach / assistant manager – Vic Rawle

== See also ==
- New Zealand Olympic Committee
- New Zealand at the Commonwealth Games
- New Zealand at the 1948 Summer Olympics
- New Zealand at the 1952 Summer Olympics
