= Bill James (rower) =

New Zealand rower (1926–2001)

Personal information
- Full name: John William James
- Born: 13 October 1926
- Died: 22 October 2001 (aged 75)
- Spouse: Esme Florence Rasmusen (m. 1947)

Sport
- Sport: Rowing
- Club: Aramoho Boating Club
Medal record
Men's rowing
Representing New Zealand
British Empire Games
Gold medal – first place	1950 Auckland	Coxed four

John William James (13 October 1926 – 22 October 2001) was a New Zealand rower who won a gold medal representing his country in the men's coxed four, alongside Ted Johnson, John O'Brien, Bill Carroll, and Colin Johnstone (coxswain), at the 1950 British Empire Games.

James died on 22 October 2001, and his ashes were buried at Pyes Pa Cemetery, Tauranga, with those of his wife, Esme Florence James (née Rasmusen), who died in 2018.
