= Margaret Sweeney =

Margaret Sweeney may refer to:

- Margaret M. Sweeney (born 1955), American judge
- Margaret Sweeney (swimmer) (born 1929/1930), New Zealand swimmer

== See also ==
- Margaret Campbell, Duchess of Argyll, also known as Margaret Sweeny
