= Don Olive =

New Zealand racing cyclist (died 1984)

Personal information
- Born: Donald Charles Henry Olive; 1930 or 1931
- Died: 17 November 1984 (aged 53) San Francisco, California, United States

Sport
- Country: New Zealand
- Sport: Track cycling

Donald Charles Henry Olive (1930/31 – 17 November 1984) was a New Zealand racing cyclist who represented his country at the 1950 British Empire Games.

As a 19-year-old, Olive competed in the men's sprint at the 1950 British Empire Games in Auckland. In his heat, he defeated E. Evans from Rhodesia and Canadian John Millman, and went on to beat Tommy Godwin 2–0 in the quarterfinals. In the semifinals, he lost 0–2 to the eventual gold medallist, Russell Mockridge from Australia, and then in the ride-off for the bronze medal he was beaten 2–1 by his New Zealand teammate Graham Avery.

Olive died in San Francisco on 17 November 1984, aged 53.
