= The Lost Generation (band) =

American soul band

- Origin: Chicago, Illinois
- Genres: Soul
- Years active: 1969–1974
- Label: Brunswick Records
- Past members: Lowrell Simon; Fred Simon; Jesse Dean; Larry Brownlee; Leslie Dean

The Lost Generation was an American soul group from Chicago, Illinois, active between 1969 and 1974.

The members Lowrell Simon, Fred Simon (brothers), Jesse Dean, Leslie Dean and Larry Brownlee began singing together in 1969. This was after Jesse Dean completed time in the United States Army. Shortly after forming, Lowrell Simon's childhood friend, Gus Redmond (who was by that time promotional head at Brunswick Records), had the group record with producer Carl Davis. The result of these sessions was the single "The Sly, Slick and the Wicked", which became a hit in the US, and whose sales earned Brunswick Records enough profits to buy itself out and dissociate itself from its parent company, Decca Records, that same year. Lowrell Simon was inspired for the song's title by the film title The Good, the Bad and the Ugly.

The group scored a few further hits, and disbanded in 1974. Members Brownlee and Fred Simon later joining Mystique. Lowrell Simon embarked on a successful career as a songwriter and, in the late 1970s, a solo artist. Larry Brownlee died in 1978. Fred Simon sang bass vocals with The Chi-Lites. Lowrell Simon died in 2018 of multiple health complications. Fred Simon died in April 2026, at the age of 74. At the time of his death, Simon was the last surviving original member of the group.

== Members ==
=== Original lineup ===
- Larry Brownlee (formerly of The C.O.D.s; died 1978)
- Jesse Dean (died 2003)
- Fred Simon (died 2026)
- Lowrell Simon (formerly of The Vondells; died 2018)

=== Other members ===
- Leslie Dean

== Discography ==
=== Albums ===
- The Sly, Slick and the Wicked (Brunswick Records, 1970)
- The Young, Tough and Terrible (Brunswick Records, 1972)

=== Singles ===
- "The Sly, Slick and the Wicked" (1970) US No. 30, US R&B Singles No. 14, No. 45 CAN
- "Wait a Minute" (1970) US R&B Singles No. 25
- "Someday" (1971) US R&B Singles No. 48
- "Talking the Teenage Language" (1971) US R&B Singles No. 35
- "Your Mission (If You Decide to Accept It) Part I" (1974) US R&B Singles No. 65
