= Joan Hastings =

Joan Hastings may refer to:

- Joan Hastings (swimmer) (1925–2004), New Zealand swimmer
- Joan Hastings (politician) (1932–2021), American politician from Oklahoma
