= Norma Williams =

New Zealand swimmer

Norma Williams MBE
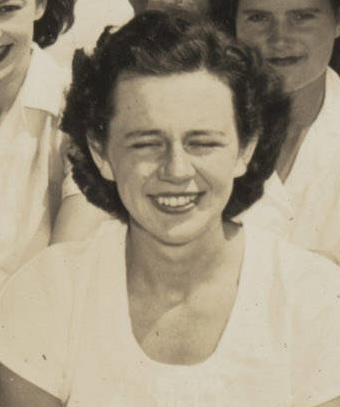
- Bridson in 1950

Personal information
- Born: Norma Mary Bridson; 11 December 1928 Auckland, New Zealand
- Died: 3 October 2017 (aged 88) Auckland, New Zealand
- Education: Takapuna Grammar School
- Spouse: Clifford Ruscoe Ashe Williams (m. 1952; died 2016)
- Children: 3

Sport
- Country: New Zealand
- Sport: Swimming

Achievements and titles
- National finals: 100 yards butterfly champion (1949, 1950, 1951); 400 yards medley champion (1948, 1949, 1950)
Medal record
Women's swimming
Representing New Zealand
British Empire Games
Silver medal – second place	1950 Auckland	4 x 110 yards Freestyle Relay

Norma Mary Williams MBE (née Bridson, 11 December 1928 – 3 October 2017) was a New Zealand swimmer, swimming administrator and author, who represented her country at the 1950 Empire Games in Auckland.

== Biography ==
Born in Auckland in 1928, Williams was educated at Takapuna Grammar School.

At the 1950 British Empire Games she won the silver medal as part of the women's 440 yard freestyle relay. Her teammates in the relay were Winifred Griffin, Joan Hastings and Kristin Jacobi. She also competed in the 110 yards freestyle event, finishing in fifth place.

Williams won six national swimming titles: the 400 yards women's medley in 1948, 1949 and 1950; and the 100 yards women's butterfly in 1949, 1950 and 1951.

She married Clifford Ruscoe Ashe Williams in 1952 and the couple had three children. She was a chaperone with the New Zealand team at the 1968 Olympic Games in Mexico City, and was appointed as a national swimming selector in 1978. She also served as the president of the Auckland Amateur Sports Association.

Williams' book, Between the Lanes, which chronicles the development of competitive swimming in New Zealand, was published in 1996. She also wrote histories to mark the centennials of the New Zealand Swimming Federation in 1990 and the Auckland Swimming Association in 2006.

In the 1977 New Year Honours, Williams was appointed a Member of the Order of the British Empire, for services to swimming.

Williams died on 3 October 2017. She had been predeceased by her husband, Cliff Williams, the previous year.
