= Gordon Hobson (wrestler) =

New Zealand wrestler (1924–1985)

Personal information
- Born: Gordon Henry Hobson; 12 August 1924
- Died: 26 May 1985 (aged 60) Christchurch, New Zealand
- Occupation: Rubber worker

Sport
- Country: New Zealand
- Sport: Wrestling

Achievements and titles
- National finals: Lightweight champion (1951); Welterweight champion (1952, 1957, 1958, 1959)
Medal record
Men's wrestling
Representing New Zealand
British Empire Games
Bronze medal – third place	1950 Auckland	Lightweight

Gordon Henry Hobson (12 August 1924 – 26 May 1985) was a New Zealand amateur wrestler. He represented his country at the 1950 British Empire Games and the 1958 British Empire and Commonwealth Games, winning a bronze medal in the lightweight division in 1950. During his career, he won five national wrestling titles.

== Biography ==
Hobson was born on 12 August 1924.

Hobson finished second to Bill Adams in the lightweight division at the 1949 New Zealand national amateur wrestling championships. He was beaten by Adams again in the trials for the New Zealand team to compete at the 1950 British Empire Games, and named as team reserve in the lightweight division. However, Hobson subsequently replaced Adams after the latter was dismissed from the New Zealand team for misconduct. Hobson lost his first bout by a fall to Dick Garrard, the eventual gold medallist, from Australia. He then lost his second-round bout to Morgan Plumb from Canada on points, and was eliminated from the competition. However, as there were only two competitors remaining, Hobson, as the lighter of the eliminated wrestlers, was awarded the bronze medal.

At the 1951 national championships, Hobson won the lightweight division, beating Bill Adams, and was also named as the most scientific wrestler at the tournament. At the following year's national championships, Hobson stepped up to the welterweight division, which he won. In 1953, he again won the national welterweight title.

In 1954, Hobson was unable to compete at the trials for the British Empire and Commonwealth Games due to injury. He was, however, named in the New Zealand team for that year's world championships in Japan, subject to fitness, but ultimately did not compete. Later that year, Hobson lost the final of the welterweight division at the national championships to Jack Monaghan on points. On the opening day of the 1955 national championships, Hobson failed a medical examination and was not allowed to compete.

At the 1956 national championships, Hobson was again runner-up to Jack Monaghan in the welterweight division. The following year, Hobson won the national welterweight title and was awarded the H. M. Allen Cup for the most scientific wrestler at the national championships. Also in 1957, he was a member of the 11-man New Zealand team that defeated Australia in a wrestling test by ten bouts to one, with Hobson winning his welterweight bout.

At the 1958 British Empire and Commonwealth Games, Hobson competed in the welterweight division. He narrowly lost his first bout on points to Kurt Boese from Canada. He won his second bout, against his Welsh opponent, A. Scott, before losing his next fight to Coenraad de Villiers from South Africa. With two loses, Hobson was eliminated from the tournament and finished in equal fifth place. Later in 1958, Hobson retained his welterweight title at the national championships in Masterton.

Hobson won his third consecutive national welterweight title in 1959.

Hobson was a rubber worker. He died in Christchurch on 26 May 1985, at the age of 60 years.
