= Trevor Eagle =

New Zealand swimmer

Personal information
- Full name: Trevor John Eagle
- Born: 12 April 1932 Auckland, New Zealand
- Died: 9 December 2000 (aged 68) Hauraki Gulf, New Zealand
- Spouse: Corallie McGuire (m. 1956)

Sport
- Country: New Zealand
- Sport: Swimming
- Club: Ponsonby Swimming Club

Trevor John Eagle (12 April 1932 – 9 December 2000) was a New Zealand swimmer who represented his country at the 1950 British Empire Games. He went on to become a successful businessman, founding the information technology firm Eagle Technology.

== Swimming ==
Born in Auckland and a member of the Ponsonby Swimming Club, Eagle came to national attention when he won the 100 yards breaststroke title at the 1949 New Zealand junior swimming championships in Napier, recording a time of 1:18.1. During the 1949 season, he lowered the New Zealand junior record for the 220 yards breaststroke four times, to 2:57.0, which was 1.0 s faster than the national senior record at the time. The senior mark was surpassed by John Shanahan at the end of the 1949 season, with a time of 2:51.8. At the 1950 national swimming championships, Eagle finished second behind Shanahan in the men's 220 yards breaststroke, the winner covering the distance in 2:58.0.

At the 1950 British Empire Games, Eagle competed in the 220 yards breaststroke. In his heat, he was second with a time of 3:01.4, and progressed to the final. He swam a time of 3:02.9 in the final to finish in fifth place.

== Business career ==
After an early career as a schoolteacher, Eagle joined the retailer Woolworths as a manager in the early 1960s. He then spent seven years working for IBM, rising to become manager of the Auckland branch. In 1969, Eagle founded Prime Computer, which later became Eagle Technology, of which he was managing director. In 2000, Eagle appeared on the National Business Review rich list, with an estimated minimum worth of NZ$26 million.

== Personal life ==
In 1958, Eagle married Corallie McGuire, and the couple went on to have seven children. He collapsed and died on 9 December 2000, after climbing on board a launch having been swimming near Motuihe Island in the Hauraki Gulf.
