= Colin Lousich =

New Zealand long-distance runner

Personal information
- Born: 30 March 1925
- Died: 9 March 2002 (aged 76)
- Occupation: Nurseryman

Sport
- Country: New Zealand
- Sport: Track and field

Achievements and titles
- National finals: 6 miles champion (1951)

Colin Lousich (30 March 1925 – 9 March 2002) was a New Zealand long-distance athlete who represented his country at the 1950 British Empire Games, and won one national athletics title.

== Athletics ==
Lousich represented New Zealand at the 1950 British Empire Games in Auckland. He competed in the men's 3 miles race, finishing sixth in a time of 14:41.0, and the men's 6 miles, in which he failed to finish.

The following year, he won the 6 miles title representing Auckland at the New Zealand national athletics championships, recording a time of 33:12.6.

== Later life and death ==
Lousich worked as a nurseryman. He died on 9 March 2002, and was buried at Swanson Cemetery.
