= Bruce Culpan =

New Zealand rower (1930–2021)

Personal information
- Full name: Bruce Ewen Culpan
- Born: 16 June 1930 Auckland, New Zealand
- Died: 24 August 2021 (aged 91) Cambridge, New Zealand
- Education: Mount Albert Grammar School
- Occupation: Pharmacy owner

Sport
- Country: New Zealand
- Sport: Rowing
- Club: West End Rowing Club
Medal record
Men's rowing
Representing New Zealand
British Empire Games
Silver medal – second place	1950 Auckland	Eight
Silver medal – second place	1954 Vancouver	Coxed four

Bruce Ewen Culpan (16 June 1930 – 24 August 2021) was a New Zealand rower who won silver medals representing his country at the 1950 British Empire Games and 1954 British Empire and Commonwealth Games.

== Early life ==
Born in the Auckland suburb of Herne Bay on 16 June 1930, Culpan was the son of Hector Cleve Culpan and Olive Maud Culpan (née Cameron).

== Rowing ==
At the 1950 British Empire Games, Culpan won the silver medal as part of the men's eight alongside crew members Don Adam (cox), Kerry Ashby, Murray Ashby, Thomas Engel, Grahame Jarratt, Don Rowlands, Edwin Smith and Bill Tinnock. At the next British Empire and Commonwealth Games in Vancouver, he was the stroke seat of the men's coxed four that won another silver medal.

== Family and death ==
Culpan died in Cambridge on 24 August 2021, aged 91. His wife had died before him.
