= John Holland (athlete) =

New Zealand hurdler (1926–1990)

Personal information
- Born: John Macfarlane Holland; 20 December 1926 Auckland, New Zealand
- Died: 9 June 1990 (aged 63)
- Height: 1.91 m (6 ft 3 in)
- Weight: 81 kg (179 lb)
- Spouse: Valerie Eileen Holland

Sport
- Country: New Zealand
- Sport: Track and field

Achievements and titles
- National finals: 120 yd hurdles champion (1950, 1951, 1952, 1955); 220 yd hurdles champion (1951, 1952); 440 yd hurdles champion (1947, 1948, 1950, 1951, 1952)
- Personal best: 400 m hurdles: 51.9 s
Medal record
Men's athletics
Representing New Zealand
Olympic Games
Bronze medal – third place	1952 Helsinki	400 metre hurdles
Commonwealth Games
Silver medal – second place	1950 Auckland	440 yards hurdles
Bronze medal – third place	1950 Auckland	4 x 440 yards relay

John Macfarlane "Dutch" Holland (20 December 1926 – 9 June 1990) was a New Zealand athlete who competed mainly in hurdles events. His greatest international success was in the 400 metre/440 yards hurdles.

== Early life and family ==
Born in the Auckland suburb of Mount Albert on 20 December 1926, Holland was the son of Rachel Colquhoun Holland (née Elliffe) and Daniel Dealy Holland, a journalist. His sister, Joan, was the principal of St Cuthbert's College from 1969 to 1989.

== Athletics ==
Holland first came to national prominence when he won the New Zealand under-19 220 yards hurdles title in 1945. He went on to win a total of 11 senior national athletics titles: the 120 yards hurdles in 1950, 1951, 1952, and 1955; the 220 yd hurdles in 1951 and 1952; and the 440 yd hurdles in 1947, 1948, 1950, 1951, and 1952. He was also the New Zealand record-holder for all three hurdles disciplines.

Competing for New Zealand in the men's 400 m hurdles at the 1948 Summer Olympics in London, Holland won his heat, but finished sixth in his semi-final and did not progress further. Four years later, at the 1952 Summer Olympics held in Helsinki, he competed in the same event, winning the bronze medal.

Holland competed at the 1950 British Empire Games held in Auckland, where he won the silver medal in the 440 yards hurdles, and a bronze medal as a member of the New Zealand 4 x 400 yards relay team with Dave Batten, Derek Steward and Jack Sutherland. He also finished fifth in the 120 yards hurdles.

In 1983, Holland was named the Auckland University Track Club's athlete of the century.

== Later life and death ==
After a period teaching, including at Southwell School in Hamilton, Holland worked in the sales section of Shell Oil for over 25 years. He died after a long illness, survived by his wife Val and two sons.

== Honorific eponym ==
Holland and his Olympic team mate, Maurice Marshall, have parallel streets, Holland Road and Marshall Street, in Hamilton named after them.
