= Nathaniel Millar =

New Zealand fencer

Personal information
- Full name: Nathaniel Malcolm Millar
- Born: 10 May 1915 Roslyn, Dunedin, New Zealand
- Died: 3 June 2011 (aged 96) Hamilton, New Zealand
- Spouse: Patricia Anne Jenks
Medal record
Representing New Zealand
Men's Fencing
British Empire Games
Silver medal – second place	1950 Auckland	Foil Team

Nathaniel Malcolm Millar (10 May 1915 – 3 June 2011) was a New Zealand fencer who won a silver medal at the 1950 British Empire Games.

Born in the Dunedin suburb of Roslyn on 10 May 1915, Millar was the son of Daisy Stewart Millar (née Carrodus) and David Young Malcolm Millar. During World War II he served as a petty officer in the Royal New Zealand Navy, and on 9 February 1943 he married Patricia Anne Jenks at St Matthew's Church in Auckland.

He won the silver medal alongside Charles Dearing, Austen Gittos and Murray Gittos as part of the men's foil team at the 1950 British Empire Games.

Millar died in Hamilton on 3 June 2011.
