= Wallace Heron =

New Zealand field athlete (1924–1990)

Personal information
- Born: 15 June 1924 Te Kūiti, New Zealand
- Died: 26 December 1990 (aged 66) Whangamatā, New Zealand

Sport
- Country: New Zealand
- Sport: Track and field

Achievements and titles
- National finals: Pole vault champion (1945, 1946, 1947, 1949, 1950)

Wallace Heron (15 June 1924 – 26 December 1990) was a New Zealand field athlete who represented his country in the pole vault at the 1950 British Empire Games.

== Biography ==
Born in Te Kūiti on 15 June 1924, Heron was the son of Samuel George Frith Heron and Margaret Thomasine Gwendolene Heron (née Turney) who were resident at Waitanguru at the time.

Representing Auckland, Heron won five New Zealand national athletic titles, winning the pole vault every year from 1945 to 1950 except 1948. At the 1950 British Empire Games in Auckland, Heron represented New Zealand in the pole vault. He finished in fourth place on a countback, recording a best height of 12 ft 9 in (3.89 m), the same as the bronze medallist, Peter Denton from Australia.

Heron died at Whangamatā on 26 December 1990, and he was buried at Pukekohe Cemetery.
