= Allen Stonex =

New Zealand racing cyclist (1917–1983)

Personal information
- Birth name: Allen Walter Stonex
- Born: 20 April 1917
- Died: 20 February 1983 (aged 65); Auckland, New Zealand

Sport
- Country: New Zealand
- Sport: Track cycling

Allen Walter Stonex (20 April 1917 – 20 February 1983) was a New Zealand racing cyclist who represented his country at the 1948 UCI Track Cycling World Championships and the 1950 British Empire Games.

Considered unlikely by some not to be included in the New Zealand team for the 1948 Summer Olympics, Stonex competed in the amateur men's sprint at that year's world cycling championships in Amsterdam, losing to Argentinian Clodomiro Cortoni in his heat. He went on to represent New Zealand in the men's sprint at the 1950 British Empire Games in Auckland. In his heat, he lost to the eventual gold medallist, Russell Mockridge from Australia, but progressed to the quarterfinals via the repechages. In the quarterfinals, he lost 0–2 to Australian Sid Patterson.

Stonex lived at Murrays Bay on Auckland's North Shore. He died on 20 February 1983.
