= Lewis Lawn =

New Zealand weightlifter (1929–1980)

Personal information
- Birth name: Lewis James Lawn
- Born: 9 January 1929; New Zealand
- Died: 20 June 1980 (aged 51); Zimbabwe

Sport
- Country: New Zealand
- Sport: Weightlifting

Achievements and titles
- National finals: Bantamweight champion (1953, 1954, 1955, 1958); Featherweight champion (1949, 1950, 1957)

Lewis James Lawn (9 January 1929 – 20 June 1980) was a New Zealand weightlifter who represented his country at the 1950 British Empire Games.

Lawn won seven New Zealand national weightlifting titles: three in the featherweight division, in 1949, 1950, and 1957; and four in the bantamweight division, in 1953, 1954, 1955, and 1958. He represented New Zealand in the featherweight division of the weightlifting at the 1950 British Empire Games in Auckland, where he finished in sixth place, recording a total of 540 lb (244.9 kg).

Lewis died in Zimbabwe on 20 June 1980.
