= George Martin (rugby league) =

New Zealander rugby league football

Personal information
- Full name: George Joseph Martin
- Born: 26 June 1931 Lower Hutt, New Zealand
- Died: 18 May 2017 (aged 85) Lower Hutt, New Zealand

Playing information
- Position: Centre
Club
Years	Team	Pld	T	G	FG	P
1952–55	North Sydney	71	44	0	0	132
Representative
Years	Team	Pld	T	G	FG	P
1953	NSW City	1	1	0	0	3

George Joseph Martin (26 June 1931 – 18 May 2017) was a New Zealand rugby league footballer who played as a centre in the 1950s. He played in the NSWRFL premiership for North Sydney.

== Early life ==
Martin was born and raised in Lower Hutt, New Zealand. Before playing rugby league, Martin excelled at discus, shot put and javelin. In 1950, Martin qualified for the 1950 British Empire Games in Auckland and competed in the pole vault. Also in 1950, Martin played for the Wellington rugby union side against the British Lions. Martin was tipped to have a bright career in the game before deciding to switch codes and play rugby league.

== Playing career ==
Martin began his first grade career in 1952 with North Sydney. Martin was a member of the Norths sides which reached the preliminary finals in 1952 and 1953 and qualified for the finals in 1954. Martin also represented New South Wales City and played an exhibition match against the American All Stars in 1953. After leaving North Sydney, Martin returned to New Zealand and played rugby league in the local competitions. He died on 18 May 2017.
