= Eric Matthews (wrestler) =

New Zealand wrestler (born 1935)

Kapiti Coast district councillor
- In office 1995–2004

Personal details
- Born: Eric Edward Matthews; 13 February 1935 (age 91)
- Sports career
- Country: New Zealand
- Sport: Amateur wrestling
Medal record
Men's wrestling
Representing New Zealand
British Empire Games
Silver medal – second place	1950 Auckland	Flyweight

Eric Edward Matthews (born 13 February 1935) is a former New Zealand amateur wrestler, puppeteer, and local politician.

== Early life and family ==
Matthews was born on 13 February 1935, the son of William Cyril Matthews and Lilian Alice Matthews (née Lansdown), and grew up in the Wellington suburb of Kilbirnie. His grandfather, Charles Lansdown, was a circus clown and puppeteer in Wellington who used the stage name "Charlie the Clown", and the family had a tradition of puppetry going back to the early 19th century.

== Wrestling ==
Matthews began wrestling when he was nine years old, and gained selection to represent New Zealand at the 1950 British Empire Games when he was 14 by defeating men who were up to 12 years his senior. At the Empire Games in Auckland, he competed in the men's flyweight (52 kg) division, winning the silver medal. Matthews continued wrestling until at least 1962, competing in the bantamweight division at that year's national championships in Gisborne.

== Puppetry ==
Matthews was taught how to use marionettes and puppets by his grandfather, Charles Lansdown, and was also a ventriloquist, singer and guitarist from a young age. As well as using puppets that had been handed down through the family, some of which were up to 150 years old, Matthews made hundreds of puppets himself, and gave performances to audiences of children, as well as on television in the early 1960s. He also co-created a puppet display depicting the Disney movie, Peter Pan, for a Wellington department store for Christmas, 1955.

== Local politics ==
After retiring as executive director of the Wellington Chamber of Commerce, Matthews was elected to the Kāpiti Coast District Council, representing the Otaki ward, and to the Otaki Community Board in the 1995 local elections. He was re-elected in 1998, and 2001, but did not seek re-election in 2004. He later served as president of the Otaki Recreational Fishing Club.
