= Neil Bates =

New Zealand middle-distance runner

Personal information
- Born: Kennard Neil Bates; 30 May 1928
- Died: 14 July 2003 (aged 75)

Sport
- Country: New Zealand
- Sport: Track and field

Achievements and titles
- National finals: 1 mile champion (1949)

Kennard Neil Bates (30 May 1928 – 14 July 2003) was a New Zealand middle-distance athlete who represented his country at the 1950 British Empire Games.

Hailing from Stratford and representing West Coast North Island, Bates won the New Zealand junior 1 mile title in 1947, recording a time of 4:22.8. In 1949, he progressed to the senior ranks and won the men's 1 mile title at the New Zealand athletics championships, in a time of 4:18.2. The following year, he represented New Zealand at the 1950 British Empire Games in Auckland in the men's 1 mile, where he ran a time of 4:25.8 to finish sixth in his heat and did not progress to the final.

Bates died on 14 July 2003, and his ashes were buried at Hillcrest Cemetery, Whakatāne.
