= Austen Gittos =

New Zealand fencer

Personal information
- Full name: Austen John Gittos
- Born: 13 November 1923 Onehunga, New Zealand
- Died: 7 December 1986 (aged 63)
- Spouse: Shirley May Hill
- Children: 2
- Relative: Murray Gittos (brother)

Sport
- Country: New Zealand
- Sport: Fencing
Medal record
Representing New Zealand
Men's fencing
British Empire Games
Silver medal – second place	1950 Auckland	Foil team

Austen John Gittos (13 November 1923 – 7 December 1986) was a New Zealand fencer who won a silver medal at the 1950 British Empire Games.

== Biography ==
Born at Onehunga on 13 November 1923, Gittos was the son of Benjamin Frank Gittos and Gladys Victoria Gittos (née Sayers), and the younger brother of Murray Gittos. He married Shirley May Hill, and the couple had two children.

He won the silver medal alongside Charles Dearing, Nathaniel Millar, and his brother Murray Gittos, as part of the men's foil team at the 1950 British Empire Games. He placed fourth in the men's individual foil. At the 1954 British Empire and Commonwealth Games he competed in the men's individual épée, foil, and sabre, placing seventh in the foil.

Gittos died on 7 December 1986, and his ashes were buried at Purewa Cemetery, Auckland. His wife, Shirley, died on 12 February 2022.
