= Charles Dearing =

New Zealand fencer (1908–1962)

Personal information
- Full name: Charles Gordon Dearing
- Born: 9 March 1908 Islington, London, England
- Died: 2 August 1962 (aged 54) Auckland, New Zealand

Sport
- Country: New Zealand
- Sport: Fencing

Achievements and titles
- National finals: Individual foil: 2nd (1946); 3rd (1947)
Medal record
Representing New Zealand
Men's Fencing
British Empire Games
Silver medal – second place	1950 Auckland	Foil Team

Charles Gordon Dearing (9 March 1908 – 2 August 1962) was a New Zealand fencer who won a silver medal at the 1950 British Empire Games.

== Early life and family ==
Born in Islington, London, England, on 9 March 1908, Dearing was the son of Hannah Dearing (née Hards) and Joseph Stephen Dearing, a painter and decorator. The family emigrated from Britain in 1913, intending to settle in Argentina, but later moved to New Zealand. In 1933, Charles Dearing married Irene Alexandra Jeffs in Auckland, and they had one son, Rodney, born in Whangārei in 1938, who would go on to be the director of the Museum of Transport and Technology in Auckland. Charles and Irene Dearing divorced in 1943, and Charles married Rosa Joy Saxton.

In 1940, Dearing graduated from Auckland University College with the degree of Bachelor of Commerce.

== Fencing ==
In 1946, Dearing was runner-up in the men's individual foil competition at the New Zealand national fencing championships held in Auckland. The following year, he finished third in the same event at the national championships in Christchurch.

Dearing represented New Zealand at the 1950 British Empire Games in Auckland, alongside Austen Gittos, Murray Gittos and Nathaniel Millar in the men's team foil competition, winning the silver medal. Dearing also competed in the individual men's foil event, but did not progress after winning only one bout in the elimination pool.

== Death ==
Dearing died on 2 August 1962, and his body was cremated at Purewa Crematorium, Auckland.
