= Joan Hastings (swimmer) =

New Zealand swimmer (1925–2004)

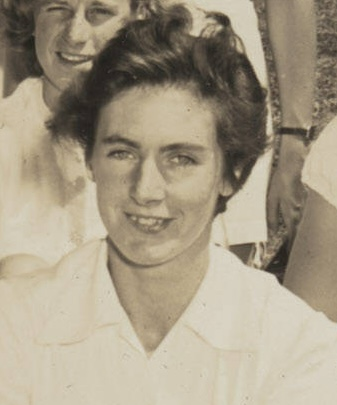
- Hastings in 1950

Personal information
- Born: Joan Margaret Hastings; 27 February 1925
- Died: 6 April 2004 (aged 79) Auckland, New Zealand
- Education: Auckland University College
- Occupations: Botanist; science teacher
- Scientific career
- Thesis: A fungal disease of Meryta sinclairii (1949)

Sport
- Country: New Zealand
- Sport: Swimming

Achievements and titles
- National finals: 3-mile champion (1955, 1956)
Medal record
Women's swimming
Representing New Zealand
British Empire Games
Silver medal – second place	1950 Auckland	4 x 440 yards Freestyle Relay

Joan Margaret Monahan (née Hastings; 27 February 1925 – 6 April 2004) was a New Zealand swimmer who won a silver medal at the 1950 British Empire Games, and in 1956 became the first person to swim the length of Lake Rotoiti. She later competed in Masters swimming, breaking several world Masters records.

== Biography ==
Born in 1925, Hastings was educated at Auckland Girls' Grammar School and Auckland University College, from where she graduated Master of Science with first-class honours in 1950. Her thesis was titled A fungal disease of Meryta sinclairii.

At the 1950 British Empire Games she won the silver medal as part of the women's 440 yard freestyle relay. Her teammates in the relay were Norma Bridson, Winifred Griffin and Kristin Jacobi.

Hastings subsequently became known as a long-distance swimmer, swimming the New Zealand national 3-mile championship in both 1955 and 1956; her sister Pat Hastings had won the same event in 1952. In April 1955, she attempted to swim the 12-mile (19 km) Lake Wairarapa, but had to abandon the swim after five hours with about a mile to go, due to choppy water and the cold. However, the following January, she became the first person to swim the length of Lake Rotoiti, completing the swim in seven hours. In February 1957, Hastings and her sister Pat completed a 16-mile (26 km) swim, taking 12 hours, as part of the Mount Morgan Welfare Swimming Club carnival in Queensland, Australia.

She studied bacteriology in Britain in 1956, and worked as a botanist at the Forest Research Institute, later returning to teach at Auckland Girls' Grammar School. She retired as head of science there in 1979.

In her later years, Hastings was active in Masters swimming, and broke several world Masters records, including the 1500 m world record for the 60–64 years category in 1987, and numerous New Zealand Masters records. She died in Auckland on 6 April 2004, at the age of 79.
