= Terry Harris =

New Zealand water polo player

Personal information
- Born: 16 July 1923
- Died: 21 November 1980 (aged 57)

Sport
- Sport: Water polo
Medal record
Representing New Zealand
British Empire Games
| Silver medal – second place | 1950 Auckland | Water polo |

Terence Walter Harris (16 July 1923 – 21 November 1980) was a New Zealand water polo player who represented his country at the 1950 British Empire Games.

At the 1950 British Empire Games he won the silver medal as part of the men's water polo team.
