= Keith Forsythe =

New Zealand field athlete

Personal information
- Full name: Keith Henderson Forsythe
- Born: 4 August 1927 Waimate, New Zealand
- Died: 18 July 2003 (aged 75)

Sport
- Country: New Zealand
- Sport: Track and field

Achievements and titles
- National finals: Triple jump champion (1946, 1948)

Keith Henderson Forsythe (4 August 1927 – 18 July 2003) was a New Zealand field athlete who represented his country in the long jump and triple jump at the 1950 British Empire Games.

== Biography ==
Born in Waimate on 4 August 1927, Forsythe was the son of Francis Forsythe and Jessie Dodds Forsythe (née Currie).

Representing Hawke's Bay/Poverty Bay, Forsythe won two New Zealand national athletics titles in the triple jump, in 1946 and 1948.

At the 1950 British Empire Games in Auckland, Forsythe represented New Zealand in both the long jump and triple jump. He finished in fourth place in the long jump with a best leap of 23 ft 3 in (7.09 m), and fifth in the triple jump, recording a best distance of 46 ft 7 3/4 in (14.22 m).

Forsythe died on 18 July 2003.
