= Roger Gibbs (swimmer) =

New Zealand swimmer (1932–2012)

Personal information
- Born: Roger Woodward Gibbs; 2 October 1932 Christchurch, New Zealand
- Died: 25 October 2012 (aged 80)

Sport
- Country: New Zealand
- Sport: Swimming

Roger Woodward Gibbs (2 October 1932 – 25 October 2012) was a New Zealand swimmer who represented New Zealand at the 1950 British Empire Games.

== Biography ==
Born in Christchurch on 2 October 1932, Gibbs was a 17-year-old schoolboy when he was selected to swim for New Zealand at the 1950 British Empire Games in Auckland. In his heat of the men's 110 yards backstroke, he swam a time of 1:18.7 and did not progress to the final.

Gibbs later worked as a wool buyer and an insurance company manager, and retired to Greytown after living in the Wellington suburb of Wadestown for 40 years. He died on 25 October 2012, and was survived by his wife, Jill.
