= Murray Gittos =

New Zealand fencer

Personal information
- Full name: Murray Benjamin Gittos
- Born: 4 January 1920
- Died: 20 November 2014 (aged 94) Red Beach, New Zealand
- Spouse: Hazel Constance Faith Holliday (m. 1946)
- Relative: Austen Gittos (brother)

Sport
- Country: New Zealand
- Sport: Fencing

Achievements and titles
- National finals: Foil champion (1949)
Medal record
Representing New Zealand
Men's Fencing
British Empire Games
Silver medal – second place	1950 Auckland	Foil Team

Murray Benjamin Gittos (4 January 1920 – 20 November 2014) was a New Zealand fencer, who won a silver medal at the 1950 British Empire Games.

== Early life and family ==
Gittos was born on 4 January 1920, the elder son of Benjamin Frank Gittos and Gladys Victoria Gittos (née Sayers). His younger brother was Austen Gittos. Murray Gittos was educated at Auckland Grammar School from 1933, and served as a staff sergeant in the New Zealand Temporary Service during World War II. He became engaged to Hazel Constance Faith Holliday in 1945, and they married the following year.

== Fencing ==
In 1949, Gittos won the men's foil title at the New Zealand national fencing championships. The following year, at the 1950 British Empire Games, he won the silver medal alongside Charles Dearing, Nathaniel Millar, and his brother Austen Gittos, as part of the men's foil team, and placed 8th in the men's individual foil.

Gittos served a period as president of the New Zealand Amateur Fencing Association, and was elected as a life member of the organisation.

== Working life and death ==
Gittos began working for the Auckland Savings Bank in 1936. After World War II, he was a bookseller for 10 years, from 1946 to 1956. He then found employment in the Inland Revenue Department, and became the assistant secretary–organiser of the Auckland Public Service Association (PSA) in 1963. In 1967, he rose to become the Auckland regional secretary–organiser of the PSA, retiring in 1980.

Gittos died at Red Beach, north of Auckland, on 20 November 2014. His wife, Hazel, died the following year.

== Writing ==
Gittos wrote a number of short stories and books that were published. He was also a playwright, with his first major work, The Needlewomen, a three-act play set in the 1850s, premiering at the Auckland Repertory Theatre in 1951.
