= Peter Mathieson (swimmer) =

New Zealand swimmer

Personal information
- Born: Peter Emil Thomas Schwartz; 1 December 1914 New Plymouth, New Zealand
- Died: 12 October 1986 (aged 71) Queensland, Australia

Sport
- Country: New Zealand
- Sport: Swimming

Achievements and titles
- National finals: 100 yds backstroke champion (1938, 1939, 1947, 1949, 1950)
Medal record
Men's swimming
Representing New Zealand
British Empire Games
Bronze medal – third place	1950 Auckland	3×110 yd medley relay

Peter Emil Thomas Mathieson (né Schwartz; 1 December 1914 – 12 October 1986) was a New Zealand swimmer who won a bronze medal representing his country at the 1950 British Empire Games.

At the 1950 British Empire Games he won the bronze medal as part of the men's 330 yards medley relay. His teammates for the relay were Lyall Barry and John Shanahan. He also competed in the men's 100 yards backstroke where he placed 4th.

== See also ==
- List of Commonwealth Games medallists in swimming (men)
