= Edwin Norton =

New Zealand weightlifter (1926–1993)

Personal information
- Birth name: Edwin Jason Norton
- Born: 26 February 1926
- Died: 26 March 1993 (aged 67); Dunedin, New Zealand
- Spouse: Eleanor Jean Milson (m. 1949)

Sport
- Country: New Zealand
- Sport: Weightlifting

Achievements and titles
- National finals: Men's lightweight champion (1947, 1948, 1949)

Edwin Jason Norton (26 February 1926 – 26 March 1993) was a New Zealand weightlifter who represented his country at the 1950 British Empire Games.

== Biography ==
Born on 26 February 1926, Norton was the son of Frederick Jason Norton and Dorothy Norton (née Snowdon). In 1949, he married Eleanor Jean Milson in Tauranga. Norton was working as a schoolteacher in Northland in 1949, and he later become a minister of religion.

Norton won the New Zealand national weightlifting championship in the lightweight division in 1947, 1948, and 1949. At the weightlifting nationals, he won the "Mr New Zealand" title for best physique in 1948 and placed third the following year. He went on to represent New Zealand in the lightweight division of the weightlifting at the 1950 British Empire Games in Auckland, where he finished in fourth place, recording a total of 645 lb (292.6 kg).

Norton died at his home in Dunedin on 26 March 1993, and his ashes were buried in Andersons Bay Cemetery. His wife died in 2016.
