= Bev Brewis =

New Zealand high jumper

Personal information
- Full name: Beverley Lenna Brewis
- Born: 15 June 1930 (age 95) Hamilton, New Zealand
- Died: 22 March 2006 (aged 75) Hamilton, New Zealand

Sport
- Country: New Zealand
- Sport: Track and field

Beverley Lenna Brewis (15 June 1930 – 22 March 2006) was a New Zealand high jumper who represented her country at the 1950 British Empire Games.

== Early life and family ==
Born on 15 June 1930, Brewis was the daughter of Avril Hume Brewis (née Strachan) and Edward Cecil Brewis, a doctor, of the Hamilton suburb of Claudelands.

== Athletics ==
At the 1950 British Empire Games in Auckland, Brewis competed in the high jump, finishing fifth with a best leap of 4 ft 10 in (1.47 m).

== Death ==
Brewis died in Hamilton on 22 March 2006, and her body was cremated at Hamilton Park Crematorium.
