= Kristin Jacobi =

New Zealand swimmer

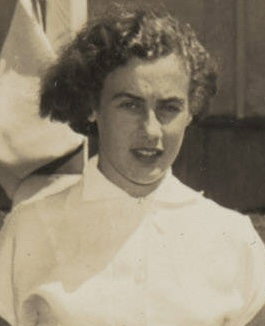
- Jacobi in 1950

Personal information
- Born: 16 October 1931 (age 94)

Sport
- Country: New Zealand
- Sport: Swimming

Achievements and titles
- National finals: 100 yards freestyle champion (1950, 1951); 220 yards freestyle champion (1950)
Medal record
Women's swimming
Representing New Zealand
British Empire Games
Silver medal – second place	1950 Auckland	4 x 440 yards Freestyle Relay

Kristin Mary Jacobi (born 16 October 1931) is a former New Zealand competitive swimmer.

== Swimming career ==
At the 1950 British Empire Games held in Auckland, she won the silver medal as part of the women's 440 yard freestyle relay. Her teammates in the relay were Norma Bridson, Winifred Griffin and Joan Hastings. Jacobi also recorded a 12th-place finish in the 110 yard freestyle. At the time of selection, Jacobi was an 18-year-old university student.
