= Don Adam =

New Zealand rowing coxswain (1935–2003

Personal information
- Born: Donald Arthur Adam; 30 November 1935
- Died: 30 October 2003 (aged 67)

Sport
- Country: New Zealand
- Sport: Rowing
- Club: West End Rowing Club

Achievements and titles
- National finals: Eights champion (1949, 1951)
Medal record
Men's rowing
Representing New Zealand
British Empire Games
Silver medal – second place	1950 Auckland	Eight

Donald Arthur Adam (30 November 1935 – 30 October 2003) was a New Zealand rowing coxswain. He won a silver medal with the men's eight representing his country at the 1950 British Empire Games.

== Biography ==
Adam was born on 30 November 1935, the son of Rhoda May and Arthur Stevens Adam. He was educated at Ponsonby School and Seddon Memorial Technical College in Auckland.

Adam had been the club coxswain at the West End Rowing Club in Auckland for a number of years, and had coxed the club's eight to victory at the 1949 national rowing championships, when he was selected to cox the New Zealand men's eight at the 1950 British Empire Games, aged 14 years. Weighing in at 45 kilograms (100 lb), Adam was 5.4 kilograms (12 lb) under the mandatory minimum for a coxswain, and so ballast was required to be added to the boat. The crew of Kerry Ashby, Murray Ashby, Bruce Culpan, Thomas Engel, Grahame Jarratt, Don Rowlands, Edwin Smith and Bill Tinnock, coxed by Adam, won the silver medal, being defeated by the Australian crew by a margin of 0.3 metres (1 ft).

At the 1951 national championships, the West End eight coxed by Adam finished third behind eights representing Australia and the University of California, but won the national title as the leading crew from New Zealand.

Adam died on 30 October 2003, at the age of 67.
