= Colin Callan =

Australian-born New Zealand swimmer

Personal information
- Birth name: Colin James Callan
- Born: 1927; Sydney, New South Wales, Australia
- Died: 21 May 1992 (aged 64–65)

Sport
- Country: New Zealand
- Sport: Swimming
- Club: Waitemata Swimming Club

Achievements and titles
- National finals: 100 yd breaststroke champion (1949); 220 yd breaststroke champion (1949); 100 yd butterfly champion (1950, 1951, 1952, 1953); 220 yd butterfly champion (1951); 100 yd individual medley champion (1950)

Colin James Callan (1927 – 21 May 1992) was an Australian-born New Zealand swimmer who specialised in butterfly and breaststroke, and represented New Zealand at the 1950 British Empire Games. He won eight New Zealand national swimming titles.

== Early life and family ==
Born in Sydney, New South Wales, Australia, Callan was the son of James and Winifred Etheleen Callan. In November 1932, four-year-old Callan saw his seven-year-old sister, Juanetta, drown in Avoca Lake, shortly after the family had moved to the area from Darlinghurst, Sydney.

In about 1947, Callan moved to New Zealand, and he worked as a mechanic. He later trained as a primary school teacher and worked on the North Shore of Auckland

== Swimming ==
In his early years as a competitive swimmer, Callan was a member of the East Sydney Swimming Club, where he was coached by Australian 1936 Olympian William Kendall. In 1945 and 1946, he finished second in the New South Wales intermediate 110 yards breaststroke championships. He became a swimming instructor for the New South Wales Amateur Swimming Association.

After moving to New Zealand, Callan won eight New Zealand national swimming titles: the 100 yards and 220 yards breastroke in 1949; the 100 yards individual medley in 1950; the 220 yards butterfly in 1951; and the 100 yards butterfly in successive years from 1950 to 1953.

At the 1950 British Empire Games in Auckland, Callan competed in the 220 yards breaststroke. He recorded the sixth-fastest time of 3:05.7 in the heats, and progressed to the final where he swam the distance in 3:09.8 to finish in sixth place.

== Other sports ==
Callan was also an accomplished surfer. In 1949, he was runner-up in the Auckland championships, and was also second in the surf skiing event.

== Later life and death ==
Callan died on 21 May 1992, and his body was cremated at North Shore Crematorium in Auckland. His ashes were buried with those of his parents at Kincumber, New South Wales, close to Avoca Lake.
