= Joseph Ward (fencer) =

New Zealand fencer

Sir Joseph Ward Bt
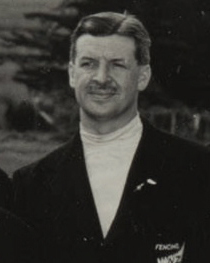
- Ward in 1950

Chair of Canterbury University College Council
- In office 1948–1951
- Preceded by: Walter Cuthbert Colee
- Succeeded by: William John Cartwright

Personal details
- Born: Joseph George Davidson Ward; 17 September 1909 Invercargill, New Zealand
- Died: 4 August 1970 (aged 60) Christchurch, New Zealand
- Spouse: Joan Mary Haden (née Laffey) (m. 1944)
- Children: 6
- Relatives: Joseph Ward (grandfather); Vincent Ward (uncle)
- Profession: Lawyer
- Sports career
- Sport: Fencing
- Club: Christchurch Swords Club

Sir Joseph George Davidson Ward, 3rd Baronet (17 September 1909 – 4 August 1970) was a New Zealand fencer and fencing administrator who represented his country at the 1950 British Empire Games. He was active in public life in Christchurch from the 1930s until his death, and served as the honorary consul for Belgium in that city for 30 years.

== Early life and family ==
Ward was born in Invercargill on 17 September 1909, the son of Cyril Rupert Joseph Ward, later 2nd Baronet, and Elinor Angela Ward (née Davidson). He was the grandson of New Zealand prime minister Sir Joseph Ward, who was created 1st Baronet Ward of Wellington in 1911.

He was educated at Christ's College, Christchurch from 1921 to 1926, and went on to study law at Canterbury University College, completing a Bachelor of Laws in 1933 and a Master of Laws the following year. While at Canterbury, Ward was active in student sports, and was chair of the New Zealand University tournament committee in 1934.

Following his father's death on 10 November 1940, Ward succeeded him as 3rd Baronet.

On 10 June 1944 at the Basilica of the Sacred Heart in Wellington, Ward married Joan Mary Haden (née Laffey), whose first husband, Seymour Haden, had been killed on active service with Bomber Command in 1942. The couple went on to have six children.

== Fencing ==
Ward was a founding member and first vice-captain of the Christchurch Swords Club in 1930; his father, Sir Cyril Ward, was the club's patron. Eight years, later Joseph Ward was closely involved in the formation of the New Zealand Amateur Fencing Association, as the convenor of a conference held in Christchurch in 1938 that led to establishment of the association, and he was elected as the inaugural president.

At the inaugural national fencing championships held in Christchurch in October 1938, Ward finished second in the men's foil, behind the left-handed L.D. Nathan from Auckland.

Ward was one of the three selectors of the fencing team that represented New Zealand in fencing at the 1950 British Empire Games in Auckland, and was named as captain of the épée squad. He competed in both the individual and team épée events. In the individual épée, he progressed to the final pool round, where he won two of his six matches to finish in eighth place. In the team event, New Zealand lost all three of its round robin matches to finish in fourth place; Ward only fenced in the match against Australia, winning two of his three contests in the team's 4–5 loss.

Between 1938 and 1954, Ward was a vice-president of the Fédération Internationale d'Escrime (International Fencing Federation), and he served as a member of the New Zealand Olympic and British Empire Games Association, representing the New Zealand Amateur Fencing Association, from 1938 to 1958.

== Professional career ==
=== Legal and commercial ===
In 1934, Ward was admitted as a barrister and solicitor, and in 1938 he was appointed as a notary public. He was a member of the Christchurch Stock Exchange between 1945 and 1966, and an associate of the Institute of Chartered Shipbrokers from 1938.

=== Honorary consul ===
Ward served as the honorary consul for Belgium in Christchurch from 1940 until his death, and from 1959 he was dean of the consular corps in Christchurch. In 1950, he was appointed to the Belgian Order of the Crown, and in 1966 he was awarded the Civic Medal 1st Class by Belgium.

== Other activities ==
Ward was active in many community and public organisations. He served on the council of Canterbury University College (later the University of Canterbury) for 34 years from 1934, including three years as chair between 1948 and 1951. He was a member of the court of directors of the Royal Humane Society of New Zealand, and was its president from 1946. Between 1942 and 1962, Ward was the Canterbury provincial commissioner of boy scouts, and he served as president of the Canterbury branch of the Hard of Hearing League from 1946 to 1958.

Ward counted philately and contract bridge among his recreational pursuits. He served as president of the Federation of New Zealand Philatelic Societies in 1958, and was a member of the management committee of the New Zealand Contract Bridge Association from 1957. From 1938, Ward was president of the Canterbury Travel Club, and was president of the New Zealand Society of Travel Clubs between 1950 and 1951.

In 1940, during World War II, Ward was attached to the headquarters of the southern military district in Christchurch with the rank of captain. In 1953, he was awarded the Queen Elizabeth II Coronation Medal.

== Death ==
Ward died in Christchurch on 4 August 1970, and was buried at Waimairi Cemetery, Christchurch. Upon his death, he was succeeded as Baronet by his eldest son, Joseph James Laffey Ward, as 4th Baronet. Joan, Lady Ward, died in 1993.

== Arms ==
Coat of arms of Joseph Ward
Crest A demi-griffin Azure in front of two keys in saltire wards upwards Or. Escutcheon Azure a cross moline Argent between four keys wards upwards Or. Motto Animo Et Fide

Baronetage of the United Kingdom
Preceded by Cyril Ward	Baronet (of Wellington); 1940–1970	Succeeded by Joseph Ward
