= Jack Sutherland =

New Zealand sprinter (1927–2020)

Jack Sutherland QSM
Personal information
- Born: John Wilson Sutherland; 18 July 1927 Oamaru, New Zealand
- Died: 8 October 2020 (aged 93) Oamaru, New Zealand
- Spouse: Joy Hill (m. 1951; died 2008)

Sport
- Country: New Zealand
- Sport: Track and field
Medal record
Men's athletics
Representing New Zealand
British Empire Games
Bronze medal – third place	1950 Auckland	4 x 440 yards relay

John Wilson Sutherland QSM (18 July 1927 – 8 October 2020) was a New Zealand sprinter who won a bronze medal representing his country at the 1950 British Empire Games

== Early life and family ==
Sutherland was born in Oamaru on 18 July 1927, and was educated at Waitaki Boys' High School. In 1951, Sutherland married Joy Hill, and the couple went on to have three children.

== Athletics ==
As a young man, Sutherland moved to Christchurch to further his running, becoming a member of the Christchurch Technical club. On 26 February 1949, he broke the Canterbury record over 440 yards, recording a time of 49.7 seconds at Lancaster Park. Two weeks later, at the 1949 national athletic championships held at the same venue, he finished second to Dave Batten in the men's 440 yards final.

At the 1950 British Empire Games, Sutherland won the bronze medal in the men's 4 x 440 yards relay alongside Dave Batten, John Holland and Derek Steward. He also competed in the men's 440 yards where he placed 6th overall.

== Later life ==
Returning to Oamaru to live in 1953, Sutherland worked at Farmers department store for many years. In 1973, he opened his own clothing store, Sutherland's Menswear.

Sutherland was active in the Lions service club in North Otago. In the 1992 Queen's Birthday Honours, he was awarded the Queen's Service Medal for community service. In 2019, he was inducted into the Waitaki Boys' High School sports hall of fame.

Sutherland died in Oamaru on 8 October 2020, aged 93. He had been predeceased by his wife, Joy Sutherland, in 2008.
