= Jack Clarke (athlete) =

New Zealand marathon runner

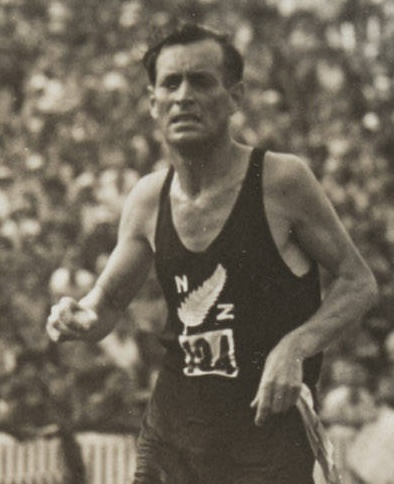
- Clarke competing at the 1950 British Empire Games

Personal information
- Born: John Richard Clarke; 28 December 1919
- Died: 19 July 1996 (aged 76)
- Height: 1.78 m (5 ft 10 in)
- Weight: 65 kg (10 st 3 lb)

Sport
- Country: New Zealand
- Sport: Track and field
- Event: Marathon
- Club: Christchurch Athletic Club; Olympic Harrier Club

Achievements and titles
- National finals: Marathon champion (1948, 1952)
Medal record
Men's athletics
Representing New Zealand
British Empire Games
Bronze medal – third place	1950 Auckland	Marathon

John Richard Clarke (28 December 1919 – 19 July 1996) was a New Zealand long-distance athlete who won a bronze medal representing his country in the marathon at the 1950 British Empire Games.

== Athletics ==
Clarke took up running in 1943, and by 1947 he had won both the Canterbury cross-country championship and the Canterbury three-miles track title in three successive years. In 1945, he finished third in the New Zealand national cross-country championship. In 1948, Clarke won the marathon at the New Zealand athletic championships held in Dunedin, recording 2:44:06, the second-fastest winning time in the championship's history at the time.

Despite not completing the marathon course at the 1950 national championships in Napier, Clarke was one of four runners selected to represent New Zealand in the marathon at the 1950 British Empire Games the following month in Auckland. In that event, Clarke won the bronze medal in a time of 2:39:26, despite having a large dog snapping angrily at his heels at one stage of the race.

In 1952, Clarke won his second national marathon title, in a time of 2:38:42. He was nominated to represent New Zealand at the 1952 Summer Olympics, but was not selected by the New Zealand Olympic and British Empire Games Association.

== Other activities ==
Clarke was farm manager for the Roydon Lodge Stud, established by John McKenzie in 1927, at Yaldhurst on the western outskirts of Christchurch. He was also jointly responsible for maintaining the training track. In 2018, it was proposed that a new road in the Yaldhurst Park subdivision be named Jack Clarke Road.

Clarke died on 19 July 1996, at the age of 76, and was buried at Bromley Cemetery, Christchurch.
