= Lowrell Simon =

American singer (1943–2018)

Lowrell Simon (March 18, 1943 – June 19, 2018) was an American soul singer. He began as a singer in The LaVondells, which became The Vondells which featured Butch McCoy and Jesse Dean and enjoyed some regional success in the 1960s with the song "Lenore". When the Vondells broke up, Simon formed the group The Lost Generation alongside several Chicago friends, and the group scored several U.S. hits between 1969 and 1974.

== Life and career ==
Simon was born in Chicago on March 18, 1943. After the band's breakup, Simon wrote for Curtom Records. Simon made contributions to the soundtrack to the 1974 film, Three the Hard Way. He wrote the tune "Dance Master" in 1974 for Willie Henderson. He wrote tracks for the 1976 debut album of Mystique, which featured other former members of The Lost Generation.

In the late 1970s, Simon began recording under his first name. He signed to Liberace's label, AVI Records, and released an album in late 1979 entitled Lowrell. The album's second single, "Mellow Mellow Right On" b/w "You're Playing Dirty", was a No. 32 U.S. R&B hit that year. It reached No. 37 in the UK Singles Chart in December 1979. Simon wrote the 1979 tune "All About the Paper" for Loleatta Holloway.

Simon died in Newton, Mississippi on June 19, 2018, at the age of 75.

== Influence ==
The song "Mellow Mellow Right On" has been sampled copiously, including by Massive Attack ("Lately"), Joy Enriquez (Tell me how you feel), Imagination, Big Brooklyn Red ("Taking It Too Far") and Common ("Reminding Me (Of Sef)"), and has been covered by the dance production outfit L.A. Mix.
