= Florence Andrews =

New Zealand fencer (1912–1996)

Personal information
- Born: Mabel Florence Andrews; 16 September 1912
- Died: 18 June 1996 (aged 83)

Sport
- Country: New Zealand
- Sport: Fencing
- Club: Christchurch Swords Club

Achievements and titles
- National finals: Foil champion (1939, 1946)

Mabel Florence Andrews (16 September 1912 – 18 June 1996) was a New Zealand fencer, who represented her country at the 1950 British Empire Games.

== Early life and family ==
Born on 16 September 1912, Andrews was the daughter of Florence Mabel Andrews (née Cross) and Lancelot William Dolling Andrews.

== Fencing ==
A member of the Christchurch Swords Club, Andrews won the New Zealand national women's fencing championship in 1939 and 1946, the competition not being held in the intervening years because of World War II. At the 1950 British Empire Games in Auckland, Andrews represented New Zealand in the individual women's foil, recording two wins to finish in sixth place.

== Death ==
Andrews died on 18 June 1996.

== Legacy ==
Fencing Mid South awards the Florence Andrews Trophy annually to the winner of the junior girls' foil.
