= Thomas Engel (rower) =

New Zealand rower

Personal information
- Full name: Thomas Carl Engel
- Born: 19 November 1927 Auckland, New Zealand
- Died: 6 December 1979 (aged 52)
- Education: Mount Albert Grammar School
- Occupation: Dispatch foreman

Sport
- Country: New Zealand
- Sport: Rowing
- Club: West End Rowing Club

Achievements and titles
- National finals: Eights champion (1949)
Medal record
Men's rowing
Representing New Zealand
British Empire Games
Silver medal – second place	1950 Auckland	Eight

Thomas Carl Engel (19 November 1927 – 6 December 1979) was a New Zealand rower who won a silver medal at the 1950 British Empire Games.

== Biography ==
Born in the Auckland suburb of Grey Lynn on 19 November 1927, Engel was the son of Ernest Carl Engel and Anneta Eileen Engel (née Donohue). He was educated at Mount Albert Grammar School, where he enjoyed success as a boxer, defeating Kerry Ashby in the final of the 175 lb (79 kg) weight division of the school's boxing championships in 1944. He won the same division as well as the open championship the following year.

Engel was the stroke of the West End Rowing Club eight that won the men's eight title at the New Zealand championships in 1949; the other crew members were Kerry Ashby, Bill Tinnock, Murray Ashby, Don Rowlands, Grahame Jarratt, Bruce Culpan, Edwin Smith, and Don Adam (cox). The same crew subsequently represented Auckland in the 1949 interprovincial rowing championships, and were again victorious. The latter race was seen as an important trial for the 1950 British Empire Games, and the entire West End crew was selected to represent New Zealand. At the 1950 Games, raced on Lake Karapiro, the New Zealanders finished second in a time of 6:27.5, half a second behind the winning Australian crew.

Engel died on 6 December 1979, and his body was cremated at Waikumete.
