= Margaret Sweeney (swimmer) =

New Zealand swimmer

Margaret Lister
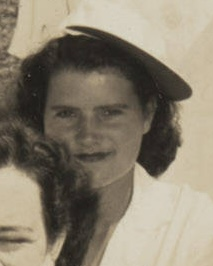
- Sweeney in 1950

Personal information
- Born: Margaret Isobel Sweeney; 1929 or 1930 (age 95–96)
- Spouse: Keith Richard Lister (m. 1956)

Sport
- Country: New Zealand
- Sport: Swimming

Achievements and titles
- National finals: 100 yards breaststroke champion (1950); 220 yards breaststroke champion (1949)

Margaret Isobel Lister (née Sweeney, born 1929 or 1930) is a former New Zealand swimmer who represented her country at the 1950 Empire Games in Auckland. She later took up long-distance swimming, and in 1955 became the first person to swim the length of Lake Taupō.

== Biography ==
Representing Auckland, Sweeney won two titles at the New Zealand national swimming championships: the 220 yards breaststroke in 1949; and the 100 yards breaststroke the following year. She went on to represent New Zealand at the 1950 British Empire Games in Auckland, finishing sixth in the 220 yards breaststroke with a time of 3:28.0. She was also a member of the New Zealand team in the 330 yards medley relay, with Jean Stewart and Winifred Griffin, that was disqualified in the final.

Sweeney then turned to long-distance swimming, and worked as a professional swimming coach at the Tepid Baths in Auckland. On 30 January 1955, she became the first person to swim the length of Lake Taupo, making the 40-kilometre (25 mi) crossing from south to north in 13 hours 39 minutes. The feat would not be repeated until 1977 when local man Patrick Cox completed the marathon swim.

Sweeney made four attempts to swim the English Channel, in 1954, 1955 and 1968, but was unsuccessful on each occasion. In 1955, she was within 800 yards (730 m) of reaching the English coast when the tide changed and pushed her back; she finally abandoned the attempt after 12 hours in the water.

On 17 November 1956, Sweeney married Keith Lister at Wanstead, Essex, England. The couple had met in Sydney in 1951 when Lister was serving in the Royal New Zealand Navy. They went on to have three sons, and ran a supermarket at Forrest Hill on Auckland's North Shore.

When the Marathon Swimming Council was formed in 1977, Sweeney was one of four swimmers elected a life member, alongside Barrie Devenport, John van Leeuwen and Perry Cameron.
