= Dave Batten =

New Zealand sprinter (1926–2013)

Personal information
- Born: David Russell Batten; 13 December 1926 Christchurch, New Zealand
- Died: 11 September 2013 (aged 86) Christchurch, New Zealand
- Spouses: Barbara Alice Jones (m. 1954; div. 1979) Joan Elizabeth Cornish (m. 1980)

Sport
- Country: New Zealand
- Sport: Track and field

Achievements and titles
- National finals: 100 yards, 1st (1947); 220 yards, 1st (1948, 1949, 1950, 1951); 440 yards, 1st (1949, 1950)
Medal record
Men's athletics
Representing New Zealand
Commonwealth Games
Bronze medal – third place	1950 Auckland	440 yards
Bronze medal – third place	1950 Auckland	4 x 440 yards relay

David Russell Batten (13 December 1926 – 11 September 2013) was a New Zealand sprinter who won two bronze medals at the 1950 British Empire Games.

== Early life and family ==
Born in Christchurch on 13 December 1926, Batten was the son of Rawhiti Eric (Raj) Batten and Maudie Batten (née Burnett). He was educated at Christchurch Boys' High School. In 1954 he married Barbara Alice Jones in Christchurch; the couple went on to have two children but later divorced. In 1980 he married Joan Elizabeth Le Cren (née Cornish).

== Athletics ==
Batten won national junior athletics titles over 100 yards and 220 yards in 1945. He then won seven senior national titles: the 100 yards in 1947; 220 yards in 1948, 1949, 1950 and 1951; and the 440 yards in 1949 and 1950. He set a national junior record for 100 yards in 1945, and in 1950 he broke the New Zealand record over 220 yards.

At the 1950 British Empire Games in Auckland, Batten won two bronze medals; one in the men's 440 yards, and one as part of the men's 440 yards relay alongside John Holland, Derek Steward and Jack Sutherland. He also reached the semi-finals of the men's 220 yards.

== Death ==
Batten died in Christchurch on 11 September 2013.
