= Helen Mackenzie (swimmer) =

New Zealand swimmer (1930–2018)

Helen Richards
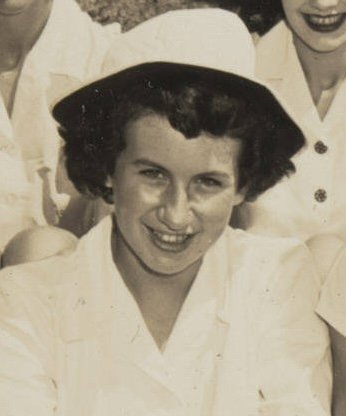
- Mackenzie in 1950

Personal information
- Born: Helen Margaret Jean Mackenzie; 20 April 1930 Auckland, New Zealand
- Died: 6 August 2018 (aged 88) Alabama, U.S.
- Education: Auckland University College
- Occupation: Bacteriologist
- Spouse: Nolan E. Richards (m. 1955)

Sport
- Country: New Zealand
- Sport: Swimming

Achievements and titles
- National finals: 440 yards freestyle champion (1950)

Helen Margaret Jean Richards (née Mackenzie; 20 April 1930 – 6 August 2018) was a New Zealand swimmer who represented her country at the 1950 Empire Games.

== Career ==
Educated at St Cuthbert's College, Mackenzie won the 440 yards freestyle title, representing Auckland, at the New Zealand national swimming championships in 1950. She also represented New Zealand at the 1950 British Empire Games in Auckland in the same event. She recorded a time of 5:47.6 to finish third in her heat and did not progress to the final.
