= Patricia Woodroffe =

New Zealand fencer

Patricia Parkinson
Personal information
- Born: Patricia Louise Woodroffe; 14 July 1926
- Died: 5 August 2001 (aged 75)
- Spouse: Finlay James Parkinson (div. c.1974)

Sport
- Country: New Zealand
- Sport: Fencing

Achievements and titles
- National finals: Foil champion (1947, 1948, 1949)
Medal record
Women's Fencing
Representing New Zealand
British Empire Games
| Silver medal – second place | 1950 Auckland | Individual Foil |

Patricia Louise Parkinson (née Woodroffe, 14 July 1926 – 5 August 2001) was a New Zealand fencer who won a silver medal for her country at the 1950 British Empire Games.

== Early life and family ==
Born Patricia Louise Woodroffe on 14 July 1926 in the Auckland suburb of Epsom, Parkinson was the daughter of Louise Olivia Woodroffe (née Martin) and William David Woodroffe. Educated at St Cuthbert's College, she married Finlay James Parkinson in the mid 1950s, but they later divorced.

== Fencing ==
Woodroffe won the New Zealand national fencing championship in three consecutive years, from 1947 to 1949. She represented New Zealand at the 1950 British Empire Games in Auckland, winning the silver medal with a record of six wins from seven bouts, losing only to the gold medallist, Mary Glen-Haig.

== Death ==
Parkinson died on 5 August 2001, and her body was cremated at Hamilton Park Cemetery.
