= Lionel Fox =

New Zealand long-distance runner

Personal information
- Born: Lionel Ernest Fox; 29 September 1912
- Died: 1 April 1978 (aged 65)

Sport
- Country: New Zealand
- Sport: Athletics

Lionel Ernest Fox (29 September 1912 – 1 April 1978) was a New Zealand long-distance athlete who represented his country at the 1950 British Empire Games.

== Early life and family ==
Born on 29 September 1912, Fox was the son of Charles Henry Fox and Louisa Esther Osborne.

On 26 December 1935, Fox married Jean Colquhoun McKenzie Bennoch at St Andrew's Presbyterian Church in New Plymouth, and the couple made their home in Christchurch. They divorced in 1953. During World War II, he served as a private in the New Zealand Medical Corps.

== Athletics ==
In 1949, Fox was one of the founders of the Olympic Harrier and Athletic Club in Christchurch. In 2011, the club merged with the New Brighton Athletics Club to form the New Brighton Olympic Athletic Club.

Fox represented New Zealand at the 1950 British Empire Games in Auckland. He competed in the marathon, finishing 13th in a time of 2:57:47.2.

== Death ==
Fox died on 1 April 1978.
