= Olga Jekyll =

New Zealand fencer

Olga Jekyll QSM
Personal information
- Born: Olga May MacPherson; 8 October 1918
- Died: 11 February 2014 (aged 95) Christchurch, New Zealand
- Spouse: Allan Joseph Jekyll (m. 1946; died 1948)

Sport
- Country: New Zealand
- Sport: Fencing
- Club: United Fencing Club

Achievements and titles
- National finals: Foil champion (1950, 1951, 1952, 1953, 1959)

Olga May Jekyll QSM (née MacPherson, 8 October 1918 – 11 February 2014) was a New Zealand fencer, who represented her country at the 1950 British Empire Games.

== Fencing ==
Born Olga May MacPherson on 8 October 1918, Jekyll competed in her first fencing tournament in 1938. She went on to win 18 Canterbury championships, and five New Zealand national titles: in 1950, 1951, 1952, 1953, and 1959. At the 1950 British Empire Games in Auckland, Jekyll represented New Zealand in the individual women's foil, recording three wins to finish in fifth place.

Jekyll retired from competitive fencing in 1972, but continued her involvement in the sport as an administrator and coach, including at Avonside Girls' High School. She was a founding member of the United Fencing Club in Christchurch in 1956.

== Personal life ==
After World War II, Jekyll married Allan Joseph Jekyll, but was widowed by his death in 1948. The couple did not have children, and she never remarried.

== Honours and recognition ==
In the 1982 Queen's Birthday Honours, Jekyll was awarded the Queen's Service Medal for community service. She was also a life member of the New Zealand Amateur Fencing Association.

Fencing Midsouth awards the Olga Jekyll Trophy annually, and organises an Olga Jekyll mixed teams event.

== Later life and death ==
As a result of the 2011 Christchurch earthquake, Jekyll was forced to move from her home. She died in Christchurch on 11 February 2014.
