= Derek Steward =

New Zealand sprinter and hurdler

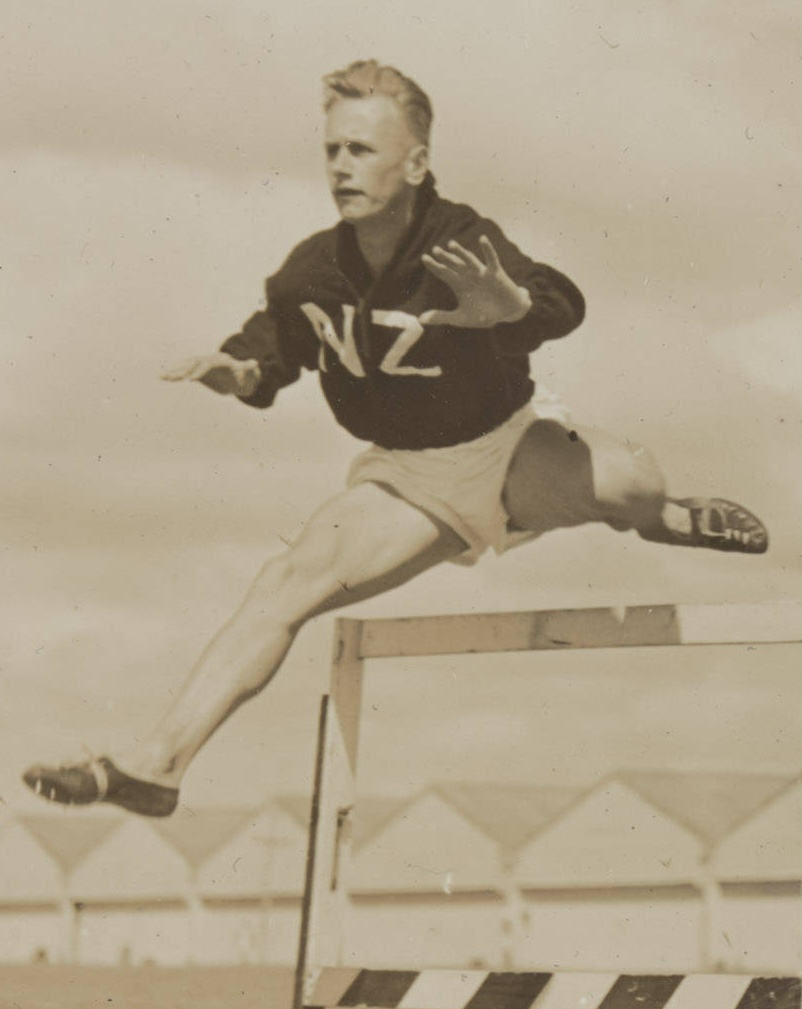
- Steward training in 1950

Personal information
- Born: Derek Guy Steward; 9 October 1928 Onehunga, New Zealand
- Died: 12 October 2017 (aged 89)

Sport
- Country: New Zealand
- Sport: Track and field
- Coached by: Alan Sayers

Achievements and titles
- National finals: 440 yards hurdles champion (1949, 1955)
Medal record
Men's athletics
Representing New Zealand
British Empire Games
Bronze medal – third place	1950 Auckland	4 x 440 yards relay

Derek Guy Steward (9 October 1928 – 12 October 2017) was a New Zealand sprinter and hurdler who won a bronze medal representing his country at the 1950 British Empire Games.

== Early life and family ==
Born at Onehunga on 9 October 1928, Steward was the son of Albert de Bolton Peel Steward and Doris Steward (née Pilcher) of Paeroa. He was educated at King's College in Auckland.

== Athletics ==
In 1946, Steward won the under-19 men's 120 yards hurdles title at the New Zealand national athletics championships. He went on to win the senior national 440 yards hurdles title in 1949 and 1955.

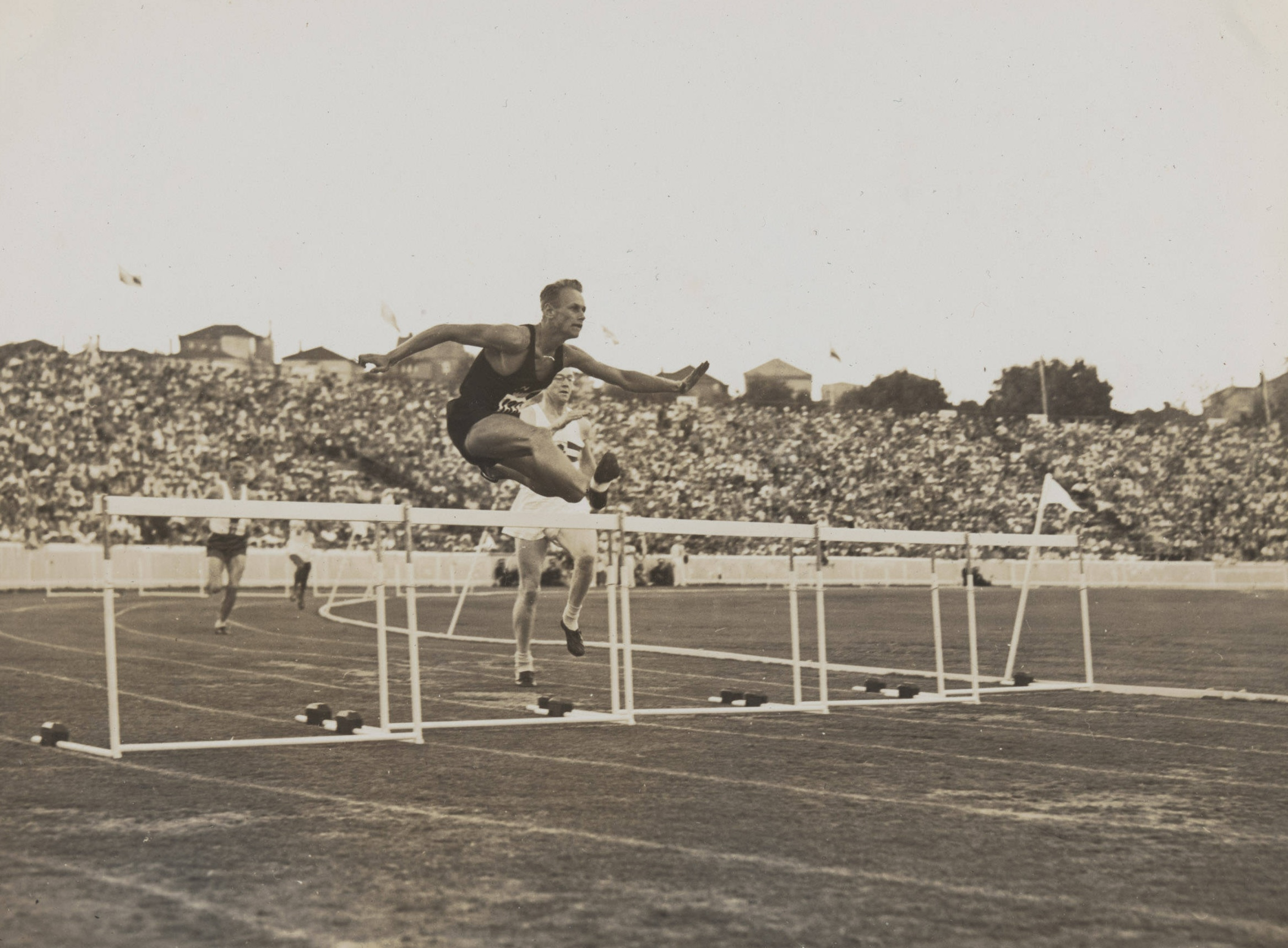
Steward leading his heat in the men's 440 yards hurdles at the 1950 British Empire Games

At the 1950 British Empire Games in Auckland, Steward was part of the New Zealand foursome—alongside Dave Batten, John Holland and Jack Sutherland—that won the bronze medal in the men's 4 x 440 yards relay. He also competed in the men's 440 yards hurdles: he won his heat in a time of 54.4 seconds, but finished fourth in his semifinal and did not progress further.

== Death ==
Steward died on 12 October 2017.
