= Jack Monaghan =

New Zealand wrestler

Personal information
- Born: 6 August 1921 Mataura, New Zealand
- Died: 3 July 2022 (aged 100)
- Spouse: Maureen Gomersall (m. 1945)
- Children: 4

Sport
- Country: New Zealand
- Sport: Amateur wrestling
- Coached by: Anton Koolmann

Achievements and titles
- National finals: 10 titles

Jack Monaghan (6 August 1921 – 3 July 2022) was a New Zealand amateur wrestler. He represented his country at the 1950 British Empire Games and the 1954 World Wrestling Championships, and won 10 national wrestling titles.

== Early life ==
Monaghan was born in Mataura on 6 August 1921, the son of Grace and Richard Monaghan, and grew up in the district. After leaving school, he worked as a delivery boy for a fish and chip shop, as a shepherd, and as a fireman for New Zealand Railways (NZR).

== Military service ==
In 1940, while employed by NZR in Wellington, Monaghan enlisted for military service. However, his work was deemed essential and his manager would not release him. In 1943, he was allowed to join the Royal New Zealand Navy, and he did his basic training at HMNZS Tamaki on Motuihe Island. After further training as a stoker in HMNZS Philomel, he was sent to Britain and served as a stoker in HMS Tintagel Castle, a Castle-class corvette escorting North Atlantic convoys, and was also assigned to a depth charge team.

During a period of leave, he went to an afternoon tea dance in Leeds, where he met his wife-to-be, Maureen Gomersall. They married after the end of the war, on 24 September 1945, at a church in Dewsbury, and returned to New Zealand to live, settling in Invercargill. The couple went on to have four children.

== Amateur wrestling ==
Monaghan began wrestling in Auckland, but moved to Wellington in 1940 to train with Anton Koolmann. He resumed wrestling after the war, and between 1946 and 1959 he won 10 New Zealand national amateur wrestling titles, competing in the middleweight and welterweight divisions.

In the 1950 British Empire Games in Auckland, Monaghan competed in the wrestling welterweight division. In his first bout, he was defeated by the Australian wrestler, Jack Little, 0 bad points to 3, while in his second match he was beaten by a fall by Henry Hudson, the eventual gold medallist, from Canada.

Monaghan was selected to represent New Zealand in the middleweight division at the 1954 World Wrestling Championships in Tokyo. He lost his opening two bouts and was eliminated from the tournament. Monaghan was also one of five wrestlers nominated by the Dominion Wrestling Union for the New Zealand team to compete at the 1954 British Empire and Commonwealth Games, but his was not one of the two nominations that was accepted by the New Zealand Olympic and British Empire Games Association.

In 1955, Monaghan was named Southland sportsman of the year.

Monaghan was one of 25 wrestlers named in a training squad to prepare for the 1956 Summer Olympics in Melbourne, and in August 1956 he was one of four men nominated by the Dominion Wrestling Union for the New Zealand team. However, the New Zealand and British Empire Games Association did not include any wrestlers in the New Zealand team.

== Later life ==
After the war, Monaghan worked as a linesman for the Post and Telegraph Department, before an apprenticeship as a builder. After 20 years in Invercargill, Jack and Maureen Monaghan moved to Christchurch, where they lived for over 40 years, before shifting to Paraparaumu following the Christchurch earthquakes of 2010 and 2011. In 2020, the couple celebrated their 75th wedding anniversary, and the following year Jack Monaghan reached his 100th birthday. He died on 3 July 2022, and was buried at Awa Tapu Cemetery in Paraparaumu.
