= Kerry Ashby =

New Zealand rower and rugby union footballer

Kerry Ashby MNZM
Personal information
- Full name: Kerry Ayling Ashby
- Born: 4 September 1928 Devonport, New Zealand
- Died: 3 March 2015 (aged 86) Weymouth, New Zealand
- Spouse: Winifred Griffin
- Relative: Murray Ashby (brother)
Medal record
Men's rowing
Representing New Zealand
British Empire Games
Silver medal – second place	1950 Auckland	Eight
Silver medal – second place	1954 Vancouver	Coxed four

Kerry Ayling Ashby MNZM (4 September 1928 – 3 March 2015) was a New Zealand rower.

== Early life and family ==
Ashby was born in Devonport on Auckland's North Shore in 1928, the son of Catherine Adele (née Gozar) and Edward Ashby, and the older brother of Murray Ashby.

From 1943 to 1946 Ashby was educated at Mount Albert Grammar School, where he was a prefect, captain of the rowing team and member of the 1st XV rugby union team. He played senior club rugby for the Grammar Old Boys club.

He was married to swimmer Winifred Griffin.

== Rowing career ==
Ashby rowed for the West End Rowing Club in Auckland, and won New Zealand national championship titles in the men's eights in 1949, 1951, 1952, 1953 and 1963, the men's coxed four in 1953 and the men's double sculls in 1956.

At the 1950 British Empire Games he won the silver medal as part of the men's eight alongside crew members Don Adam (cox), Murray Ashby, Bruce Culpan, Thomas Engel, Grahame Jarratt, Don Rowlands, Edwin Smith and Bill Tinnock. At the next British Empire and Commonwealth Games in Vancouver during 1954, he won another silver medal in the men's coxed four. He also competed in the men's coxed four at the 1952 Summer Olympic Games in Helsinki, but did not progress beyond the repechages.

He later coached the Mount Albert Grammar rowing squad from 1966 to 1978, and was the manager of the New Zealand rowing team at the 1976 Olympic Games in Montreal, where the New Zealand men's eight won bronze.

Ashby served a term as president of the New Zealand Rowing Association, and was made a life member of both the West End Rowing Club and Rowing New Zealand. In the 2001 Queen's Birthday Honours, he was appointed a Member of the New Zealand Order of Merit, for services to rowing.

Ashby died at his home in the south Auckland suburb of Weymouth in 2015.
