= John Shanahan (swimmer) =

New Zealand swimmer (1924–1987)

Personal information
- Born: 27 February 1924 Oamaru, New Zealand
- Died: 7 October 1987 (aged 63) Auckland, New Zealand
- Spouse: Phyllis Josephine Dwyer (m. 1951)
- Relative: Foss Shanahan (brother)

Sport
- Country: New Zealand
- Sport: Swimming

Achievements and titles
- National finals: 100 yd breaststroke champion (1946, 1947, 1948, 1950); 220 yd breaststroke champion (1947, 1948, 1950); 100 yd butterfly champion (1948); 220 yd butterfly champion (1948, 1950); 100 yd individual medley champion (1948)
Medal record
Men's swimming
Representing New Zealand
British Empire Games
Bronze medal – third place	1950 Auckland	3 × 110 yd medley relay

John Shanahan (27 February 1924 – 7 October 1987) was a New Zealand swimmer who won a bronze medal representing his country at the 1950 British Empire Games.

== Early life and family ==
Shanahan was born in Oamaru on 27 February 1924, the youngest of eight children of Thomas and Ethel Florence Shanahan. His father was a police officer who rose to become superintendent of police in Christchurch. All of the Shanahan children were involved in swimming, with six of the eight winning provincial championship titles. Shanahan's oldest brother, Foss, became a diplomat.

== Swimming career ==
Shanahan was particularly noted as a breaststroke swimmer, and he won four New Zealand national titles in that stroke over 100 yards (1946, 1947, 1948 and 1950) and three over 220 yards (1947, 1948 and 1950). He also won the national 100 yards butterfly title in 1948, the 220 yards butterfly title in 1948 and 1950, and the 100 yards individual medley title in 1950.

In late 1948, Shanahan moved to Australia, and he won the Australian national 220 yards breaststroke title the following year. However, he returned to New Zealand in May 1949, with the intention of representing New Zealand at the 1950 British Empire Games, and he was duly selected.

At the 1950 British Empire Games, Shanahan won a bronze medal in the men's 3 × 110 yards medley relay, alongside Peter Mathieson and Lyall Barry. He also competed in the men's 220 yards breaststroke where he placed 4th in the final, after qualifying third fastest.

== Later life ==
In 1951, Shanahan married Phyllis Josephine Dwyer. He was latterly a waterside worker in Auckland, and died there on 7 October 1987, at the age of 63. He was buried at Waikumete Cemetery. His wife died in 2015.

== See also ==
- List of Commonwealth Games medallists in swimming (men)
