= Grahame Jarratt =

New Zealand rower (1929–2011)

Personal information
- Full name: Grahame Laughlan Jarratt
- Born: 10 January 1929 Mount Eden, Auckland, New Zealand
- Died: 5 August 2011 (aged 82) Red Beach, New Zealand
Medal record
Men's rowing
Representing New Zealand
British Empire Games
Silver medal – second place	1950 Auckland	Eight

Grahame Laughlan Jarratt (10 January 1929 – 5 August 2011) was a New Zealand rower.

At the 1950 British Empire Games he won the silver medal as part of the men's eight alongside crew members Don Adam (cox), Kerry Ashby, Murray Ashby, Bruce Culpan, Thomas Engel, Don Rowlands, Edwin Smith and Bill Tinnock.
