= Catherine Pym =

Australian fencer (1921–2018)

Personal information
- Full name: Catherine Irene Pym
- Born: 9 August 1921 Strathfield, New South Wales, Australia
- Died: 28 March 2018 (aged 96)

Sport
- Sport: Fencing
Medal record
Representing Australia
British Empire Games
Bronze medal – third place	1950 Auckland	Woman’s Foil, Individual

Catherine Pym (9 August 1921 – 28 March 2018) was an Australian fencer. She competed in the women's individual foil event at the 1952 Summer Olympics. Pym also competed at the 1950 British Empire Games in Auckland, New Zealand, where she won a bronze medal in the Women's Foil, Individual.

== Early life ==
Born in the Sydney suburb of Strathfield in 1921 to Julius Tindall Pym of New Zealand and Irene Tootell of England, she was one of three girls. Pym started fencing after she left school at PLC, Croydon and went to train as a sports teacher at The Sword's Club in Sydney NSW. She taught in New Zealand and Australia before going to France in 1947 to gain more experience and to train for the British Empire Games. She spent 2 years in Paris, France to achieve this as there was not enough competition in Australia, fencing being a fledgling sport in Australia.

== Fencing career ==
- 1948: 2nd Australian woman to be awarded the coveted “Maitre d’Arm” from the Academie d’Armes in Paris, France. The highest qualification a fencer can achieve.
- 1949: NSW Champion, Woman's Individual Foil
- 1950: NSW Champion, Woman's Individual Foil
- 1950: Bronze Medal at the British Empire Games in Auckland, NZ in Woman's Individual Foil
- 1952: Attended Helsinki Olympics to compete in the Woman's Individual Foil. Eliminated in the first round of the Individual Foil, placing 30th overall out of 37 competitors.

== Personal life ==
Pym married Alan Onslow in 1954 and lived overseas until returning to Australia in 2000. They had 3 daughters together. Her fencing career ended when she married due to travel commitments but she continued teaching for pleasure. Pym died in March 2018 at the age of 96.
