= Gus Redmond =

New Zealand athlete and billiards player

Personal information
- Born: Angus Edward Redmond; 11 November 1912
- Died: 6 November 1978 (aged 65) Auckland, New Zealand
- Occupation: Surveyor
- Spouse: Elizabeth Hamilton Fitch (m. 1946)

Sport
- Country: New Zealand
- Sport: Track and field Billiards

Achievements and titles
- National finals: Discus throw champion (1946, 1947, 1948, 1949, 1950, 1951)

Angus Edward Redmond (11 November 1912 – 6 November 1978) was a New Zealand athlete and billiards player. He won six consecutive national discus throw titles and represented his country in that event at the 1950 British Empire Games. Later, he represented New Zealand at the World Amateur Billiards Championship in 1964.

== Early life and family ==
Born on 11 November 1912, Redmond was the son of Harry O'Neil Redmond and Rebecca Redmond (née Tait). During World War II, he saw active service in North Africa with the 2nd New Zealand Expeditionary Force, serving as a driver in the New Zealand Army Service Corps.

== Sporting career ==
=== Athletics ===
A discus thrower, Redmond won the New Zealand national discus throw title in six consecutive years from 1946 to 1951. His longest winning throw at the national championships was 133 ft 5 3/4 in (40.68 m), which he recorded in 1949. Redmond represented New Zealand at the 1950 British Empire Games in Auckland, finishing fifth in the discus throw, with a best distance of 132 ft 8 3/4 in (40.46 m). He retired from the sport three years later.

=== Billiards ===
Redmond represented New Zealand at the World Amateur Billiards Championship held in Pukekohe in 1964, finishing in eighth place, and second-best New Zealander.

== Personal life ==
Redmond was married to Elizabeth Hamilton (Betty) Fitch, and the couple had three children. Gus Redmond died from cancer in Auckland on 6 November 1978, and was buried at Taruheru Cemetery in Gisborne. Betty Redmond died in 2010.
