= Arthur Sneddon =

New Zealand wrestler

Medal record

Men's wrestling

Representing New Zealand

British Empire Games
Silver medal – second place	1950 Auckland	90 kg

Arthur Sneddon was a former wrestler from New Zealand.

He competed at the 1950 British Empire Games where he won the silver medal in the men's light-heavyweight or 90 kg grade.
