= Lyall Barry =

New Zealand swimmer

Personal information
- Born: Lyall Scott Barry; 15 May 1926 Invercargill, New Zealand
- Died: 3 October 2003 (aged 77) Christchurch, New Zealand
- Spouse: Joyce Smart (m. 1950)

Achievements and titles
- National finals: 100 yards freestyle champion (1948, 1950); 220 yards freestyle champion (1947)
Medal record
Men's swimming
Representing New Zealand
British Empire Games
Gold medal – first place	1950 Auckland	4×220 yd freestyle
Bronze medal – third place	1950 Auckland	3×110 yd medley relay

Lyall Scott Barry (15 May 1926 – 3 October 2003) was a New Zealand school teacher and inspector, and wrote a history of the Waimumu area in Southland. As a swimmer he won two medals at the 1950 British Empire Games.

== Early life and family ==
Born in Invercargill on 15 May 1926, Barry was educated from 1940 to 1944 at Nelson College where he was a member of the 1st XV rugby team in 1943, college swimming champion every year from 1940 to 1944, a prefect in 1943 and 1944, and played clarinet in the school orchestra. He went on to qualify as a primary school teacher at Christchurch Teachers' College and complete the one-year physical education specialist course at the Dunedin Teachers' College. In 1950 he married Joyce Smart, and they went on to have seven children.

== Swimming ==
Barry won three New Zealand national swimming titles: the 100 yards freestyle in 1948 and 1950, and the 220 yards freestyle in 1947. He set national records in winning the 220 yards title in 1947 and the 100 yards in 1948. At the 1950 British Empire Games Barry won a gold medal as part of the New Zealand men's 4 × 220 yards freestyle relay team, alongside Michael Amos, Colin Chambers and Buddy Lucas. At the same games, he also won a bronze medal with Peter Mathieson and John Shanahan in the 3 × 110 yards medley relay, and finished ninth in the men's 110 yards freestyle.

== Teaching career ==
Barry began his teaching career as an itinerant physical education teacher, first in Southland and later in Canterbury. He studied part-time at Canterbury University College, graduating with a Bachelor of Science degree in 1955. In 1956 he was appointed principal of the two-teacher Waimumu School, near Gore in Southland, and then in 1961, principal of Waianiwa School, also in Southland. Later he became principal of Queenstown District High School, where he was instrumental in expanding school facilities to include a swimming pool and a gymnasium.

In 1966, Barry moved to Christchurch, becoming principal of Aranui Primary School, and then after a short period a schools inspector. He remained in that position until retiring in 1985.

While living in the south, Barry wrote a history of the Waimumu district, In the Lee of the Hokonuis, published in 1966.

== Later life ==
Following his retirement, Barry and his wife lived at Lake Kaniere for 15 years, where they restored an old house. They returned to Christchurch in 2000, and Barry died there on 3 October 2003.

== See also ==
- List of Commonwealth Games medallists in swimming (men)
