= Neil Williams (water polo) =

New Zealand water polo player

Personal information
- Full name: Charles Neil Williams
- Born: 15 November 1918
- Died: 12 January 1998 (aged 79) Mosgiel, New Zealand
- Relative: Wally Williams (brother)

Sport
- Country: New Zealand
- Sport: Water polo
Medal record
Men's water polo
Representing New Zealand
British Empire Games
Silver medal – second place	1950 Auckland	Water polo

Charles Neil Williams (15 November 1918 – 12 January 1998) was a New Zealand water polo player.

At the 1950 British Empire Games he won the silver medal as part of the men's water polo team.

A retired firefighter, Williams died in Mosgiel on 12 January 1998, and his ashes were buried at Green Park Cemetery.
