= Wally Williams (water polo) =

New Zealand water polo player

Personal information
- Full name: Walter Francis Williams
- Born: 30 April 1921 Dunedin, New Zealand
- Died: 8 January 2009 (aged 87) Dunedin, New Zealand
- Relative: Neil Williams (brother)

Sport
- Country: New Zealand
- Sport: Water polo
Medal record
Men's water polo
Representing New Zealand
British Empire Games
Silver medal – second place	1950 Auckland	Water polo

Walter Francis Williams (30 April 1921 – 8 January 2009) was a New Zealand water polo player.

At the 1950 British Empire Games, he won the silver medal as part of the men's water polo team.

A retired commercial salesman, Williams died in Dunedin on 8 January 2009.
