= Edwin Smith (rower) =

New Zealand rower (1922–1997)

Personal information
- Born: 17 September 1922 Auckland, New Zealand
- Died: 15 January 1997 (aged 74) Auckland, New Zealand
Medal record
Men's rowing
Representing New Zealand
British Empire Games
Silver medal – second place	1950 Auckland	Eight

Edwin Smith (also known as Ted; 17 September 1922 – 15 January 1997) was a New Zealand rower who won a silver medal at the 1950 British Empire Games as part of the New Zealand men's eight.

== Biography ==
Smith was born in Auckland, New Zealand, on 17 September 1922.

Edwin Smith on R&R in the Club Lounge Venice

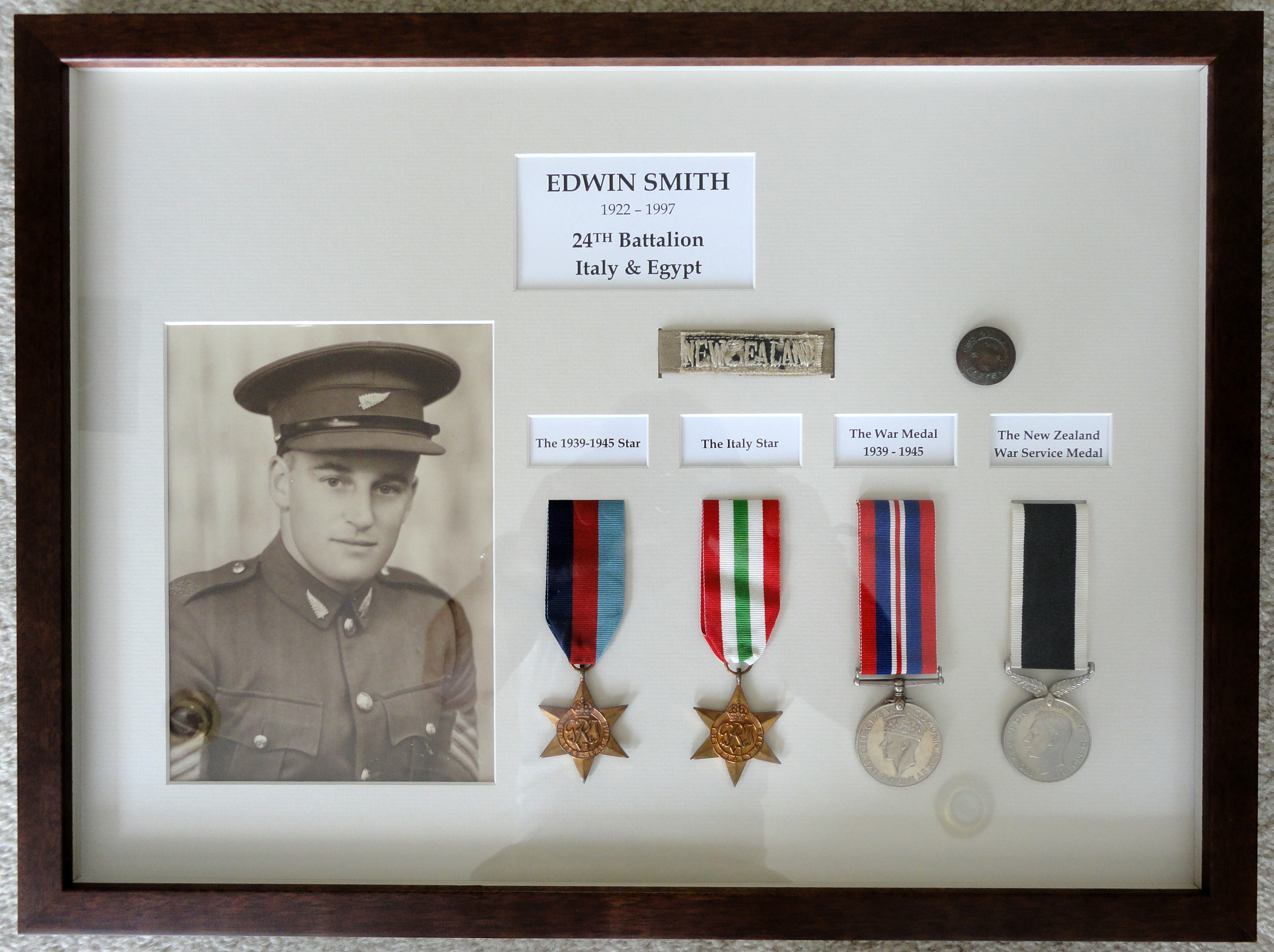
Edwin Smith – War Medal Display

Smith served with the New Zealand 24th Battalion in Italy and Egypt.

Smith became a member of the West End Rowing Club, joining the December 1948 eight crew as bow. In 1949 this crew became Red Coats by winning the New Zealand Premier Eight Championships at Karapiro.

The crew became the New Zealand Empire Games Eight and underwent strenuous training on the Waikato River at Mercer and Ngāruawāhia and on lake Karapiro. The boat to be used at the Empire Games was the tried and true Charles G. Herdman, a one piece Towns Skiff owned by West End Rowing Club. New Ayling oars with larger "spoons" were acquired.

At the 1950 British Empire Games he won a silver medal rowing in the bow as part of the men's eight alongside crew members Don Adam (cox), Kerry Ashby, Murray Ashby, Bruce Culpan, Thomas Engel, Grahame Jarratt, Don Rowlands and Bill Tinnock. In a tight race, the New Zealand eight were beaten by Australia by a margin of 0.30 metres (1 ft), recording a time of 6:27.5, 0.5 seconds behind the winning boat.

Smith later served as a coach for West End Rowing Club, on the club's executive committee and as a starter for rowing regattas. In honour of his services, he became an elected honorary member of the rowing club and later a vice-president.
