= Bill Tinnock =

New Zealand rower

Personal information
- Born: William James Tinnock; 5 April 1930 Auckland, New Zealand
- Died: 3 April 2017 (aged 86)
- Spouse: Judy Burke

Sport
- Sport: Rowing
Medal record
Men's rowing
Representing New Zealand
British Empire Games
Silver medal – second place	1950 Auckland	Eight
Silver medal – second place	1954 Vancouver	Coxed four

William James Tinnock (5 April 1930 – 3 April 2017) was a New Zealand rower.

== Biography ==
Tinnock was born on 5 April 1930 in Auckland. He was the stroke seat of the first eight from Mount Albert Grammar School to win the Maadi Cup.

At the 1950 British Empire Games, Tinnock won the silver medal as part of the men's eight alongside crew members Don Adam (cox), Kerry Ashby, Murray Ashby, Bruce Culpan, Thomas Engel, Grahame Jarratt, Don Rowlands and Edwin Smith. At the next British Empire and Commonwealth Games in Vancouver, he won another silver medal in the men's coxed four.

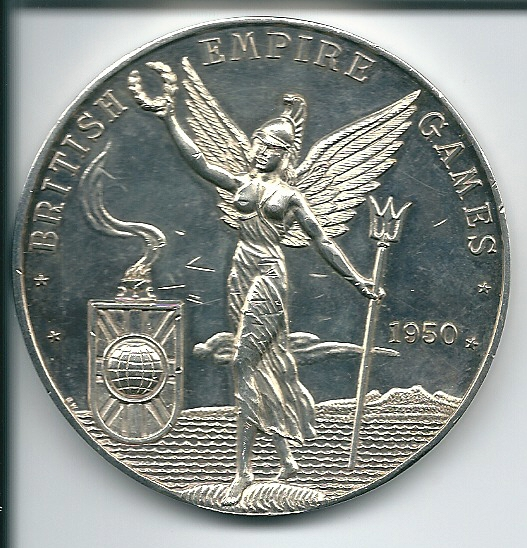
British Empire Games – 1950 – Silver Medal

At the 1952 Summer Olympics, Tinnock competed as part of the men's coxed four without progressing through to the finals. He is listed as New Zealand Olympian athlete number 75 by the New Zealand Olympic Committee.

Tinnock married tennis player Judy Burke in about 1955, and the couple went on to have two children. He died on 3 April 2017. His wife, Judy Tinnock, died in 2025.
