= Bob Hatchwell =

New Zealand water polo player

Personal information
- Born: May 30, 1920
- Died: August 30, 1976 (aged 56)

Sport
- Sport: Water polo
Medal record
Representing New Zealand
British Empire Games
Silver medal – second place	1950 Auckland	Water polo

Robert Gerald Hatchwell (30 May 1920 – 30 August 1976) was a New Zealand water polo player.

At the 1950 British Empire Games he won the silver medal as part of the men's water polo team.
