= Dave Dephoff =

New Zealand athlete (1928–2014)

Personal information
- Born: David Dephoff; 6 April 1928
- Died: 14 November 2014 (aged 86) Rotorua, New Zealand
- Spouse: Pauline Jean Coombes

Sport
- Country: New Zealand
- Sport: Athletics

Achievements and titles
- National finals: Long jump, 1st (1948, 52, 53); Decathlon, 1st (1949, 50, 51)
Medal record
Men's athletics
Representing New Zealand
Commonwealth Games
Bronze medal – third place	1950 Auckland	Long jump

David Dephoff (6 April 1928 – 14 November 2014) was a New Zealand long jumper and decathlete, who won the bronze medal in the men's long jump at the 1950 British Empire Games in Auckland.

== National championships ==
Representing Canterbury, Dephoff won the under-19 long jump at the New Zealand amateur athletics championships in 1946 and 1947, with distances of 21 ft 10 1/8 in (6.66 m) and 21 ft 10 in (6.65 m), respectively. He then won the national men's long jump title in 1948, 1952 and 1953, with a best distance of 23 ft 1 in (7.04 m) at the 1952 championships.

At the 1949 national athletics championships, Dephoff won the inaugural decathlon title, with a total of 5446 points. He went on to defend his title in 1950 (5358 points) and 1951 (5919 points).

== British Empire Games ==
At the 1950 British Empire Games held in Auckland, Dephoff won the bronze medal in the men's long jump, with a distance of 23 ft 3 in (7.09 m), behind Neville Price of South Africa who recorded a distance of 24 ft 1 in (7.34 m), and Bevin Hough of New Zealand whose best jump was 23 ft 7 3/8 in (7.20 m).

== Death ==
Dephoff died at Rotorua on 14 November 2014.
