= Jim Cameron (water polo) =

New Zealand water polo player

Sport
- Sport: Water polo
Medal record
Representing New Zealand
British Empire Games
Silver medal – second place	1950 Auckland	Water polo

Jim Cameron was a former water polo representative from New Zealand.

At the 1950 British Empire Games he won the silver medal as part of the men's water polo team.
