= Murray Ashby =

New Zealand rower

Personal information
- Born: Murray Ashby; 12 May 1931
- Died: 18 November 1990 (aged 59)
- Relatives: Kerry Ashby (brother); Winifred Griffin (sister-in-law)
Medal record
Men's rowing
Representing New Zealand
British Empire Games
Silver medal – second place	1950 Auckland	Eight
Silver medal – second place	1954 Vancouver	Coxed Four

Murray Ashby (12 May 1931 – 18 November 1990) was a New Zealand rower.

Ashby was born in 1931, the son of Edward (known as Ted Ashby) and Catherine Adele (née Gozar) Ashby, and the younger brother of Kerry Ashby. He was educated at Mount Albert Grammar School from 1944 to 1947, and was a member of the school's 1st XV rugby union team in 1946 and 1947, and rowing eight in the same two years.

Murray was in the first-ever Maddi Cup eights race that won gold in 1947 for Mount Albert Grammar School. The blue ribbon event for New Zealand secondary school rowers. He was the youngest in the crew, aged 15 years old.

In 1949, he was part of the crew who won the first-ever redcoats (premier titles) in the men's eight for West End Rowing Club on Lake Karapiro. Back then he was the youngest person in New Zealand to win a redcoat. The whole crew was selected for the men's New Zealand eight for the 1950 British Empire Games.

At the 1950 British Empire Games he won the silver medal as part of the men's eight alongside crew members Don Adam (cox), Kerry Ashby, Bruce Culpan, Thomas Engel, Grahame Jarratt, Don Rowlands, Edwin Smith and Bill Tinnock. The close race only had about a foot between first and second. Four years later at the 1954 British Empire and Commonwealth Games in Vancouver he again won a silver medal, this time in the men's coxed four.

Competing for Auckland's West End Rowing Club, in crews with his brother Kerry Ashby won New Zealand national championship titles in the men's eights in 1949, 1951, 1952, 1953 and 1963, the men's coxed four in 1953 and the men's double sculls in 1956.

In 1956, Murray and Kerry Ashby did a New Zealand Olympic trial in the men's double scull.

Ashby was also an accomplished rugby union player for the Grammar Old Boys club, and was a member of the teams that won the Gallaher Shield in 1951 and 1953.
