= Tom Logan (water polo) =

New Zealand water polo player, swimmer, surf lifesaver, dentist and naval officer

Surgeon Captain (D) Thomas Henry Logan MBE
- Born: 21 April 1927; New Zealand
- Died: 24 December 2011 (aged 84); Tauranga, New Zealand
- Military career
- Allegiance: New Zealand
- Branch: Royal New Zealand Navy
- Service years: 1952–77
- Rank: Surgeon Captain
- Conflicts: Korean War
- Awards: Member of the Order of the British Empire

Thomas Henry Logan MBE (21 April 1927 – 24 December 2011) was a New Zealand water polo player, swimmer, surf lifesaver, dentist and naval officer.

== Early life and education ==
Born in 1927, Logan was educated at New Plymouth Boys' High School, where he was head boy and captained the 1st XV rugby team. He then studied at the University of Otago, graduating with a Bachelor of Dental Surgery in 1951.

== Naval career ==
Joining the Royal New Zealand Navy in 1952 with the rank of surgeon lieutenant, Logan initially served as the dentist in HMNZS Tamaki, the naval training base on Motuihe Island. He then saw service in the Korean War, on HMNZS Kaniere and HMNZS Hawea, as well as on the front line while on secondment to the New Zealand Army. Subsequently, he served ashore as well as on HMNZS Black Prince and HMNZS Royalist.

In 1960 he was promoted to surgeon lieutenant-commander, and the following year he was sent to the United Kingdom to study oral surgery, gaining a Higher Dental Diploma from the Royal College of Physicians and Surgeons of Glasgow. Following his return to New Zealand, Logan served the remainder of his naval career ashore in HMNZS Philomel, apart from a short posting as part of the mobile dental unit on the Antarctic support ship HMNZS Endeavour.

In the 1965 New Year Honours Logan was appointed a Member of the Order of the British Empire, and the following year he was promoted to the rank of surgeon commander. He became director of defence dental services in 1969, and in 1976 he was appointed honorary dental surgeon to Queen Elizabeth II. Logan retired as a surgeon captain in 1977, the first dentist to reach that rank in the Royal New Zealand Navy. Also in 1977, he was awarded the Queen Elizabeth II Silver Jubilee Medal.

== Sporting career ==
Medal record

Men's water polo

Representing New Zealand

British Empire Games
Silver medal – second place	1950 Auckland	Water polo

=== Water polo ===
At the 1950 British Empire Games in Auckland Logan won a silver medal as part of the men's water polo team, which he captained. He coached and played in the navy team that won the New Zealand club championship in 1967.

=== Surf lifesaving ===
Logan was a member of the Fitzroy Surf Livingsaving Club in New Plymouth, and won the 1951 New Zealand championship.

=== Swimming ===
In 1949, Logan was captain of the New Zealand universities swim team that toured to Australia in 1949. He won New Zealand breaststroke and individual medley titles on two occasions and was a national record holder. He returned to competitive swimming in the masters events in the 1980s, going on to win numerous national and world masters titles and hold national and world masters records. He was also active in the administration of masters swimming and was a member of the FINA masters committee from 1987 for 10 years.

== Death ==
Logan died at Tauranga on 24 December 2011.
