= Doug Mudgway =

New Zealand wrestler (1924–1988)

Personal information
- Born: Douglas John Mudgway; 23 August 1924
- Died: 16 April 1988 (aged 63)
Medal record
Men's wrestling
Representing New Zealand
Commonwealth Games
Gold medal – first place	1950 Auckland	Bantamweight

Douglas John Mudgway (23 August 1924 – 16 April 1988) was a New Zealand amateur wrestler.

In the 1950 British Empire Games in Auckland, Mudgway won the gold medal for wrestling in the bantamweight (57 kg) division. It was New Zealand's first wrestling gold medal at the British Empire Games.

Mudgway started wrestling at an early age and won several New Zealand national titles. He married Margaret Shearman, who later became the first woman executive committee member and later the first female vice-president of the New Zealand Wrestling Association. She also served as the assistant tournament controller at the Christchurch Commonwealth Games in 1974. They had three sons — John, David and Paul — who all wrestled and had varying degrees of success. Mudgway and his son John both won titles at the 1968 City of Sydney open championships in their respective weight divisions, the first and only father and son combination to have achieved this.

A dairy farmer, Mudgway died on 16 April 1988 and was buried at Hāwera Cemetery.
