= Robert Desjarlais =

Canadian fencer (1907–1987)

Personal information
- Born: 16 August 1907 Saint-David, Quebec, Canada
- Died: 17 July 1987 (aged 79) Montreal, Canada

Sport
- Sport: Fencing

Robert Desjarlais (26 August 1907 – 17 July 1987) was a Canadian fencer. He competed in the three team events at the 1948 Summer Olympics.
