= Bill Carroll (rower) =

New Zealand rower (1928–2010)

Personal information
- Born: William James Carroll; 20 June 1928
- Died: 10 May 2010 (aged 81)
- Height: 1.82 m (5 ft 11 1/2 in)
- Weight: 80 kg (176 lb)

Sport
- Country: New Zealand
- Sport: Rowing
- Club: Aramoho Boating Club

Achievements and titles
- National finals: Eights champion (1947, 1948, 1950); Coxed fours champion (1949)
Medal record
Men's rowing
Representing New Zealand
British Empire Games
Gold medal – first place	1950 Auckland	Coxed four

William James Carroll (20 June 1928 – 10 May 2010) was a New Zealand rower. At the 1950 British Empire Games he won the gold medal as part of the men's coxed four.

Carroll was born on 20 June 1928, the son of William and Mary Kathleen Carroll. A member of the Aramoho Boating Club in Whanganui, he was a part of the Aramoho crews that won the men's eight title at the New Zealand national rowing championships in 1947, 1948 and 1950, and also the men's coxed four title in 1949. Carroll died on 10 May 2010.

In 2022, Carroll's Empire Games gold medal was put up for auction at Mowbray Collectibles, with a pre-sale estimate of $1500.
