= Ted Johnson (rower) =

New Zealand rower (1924–1985)

Personal information
- Born: George Edward Johnson; 1 May 1924 Rotorua, New Zealand
- Died: 19 July 1985 (aged 61) Wanganui, New Zealand

Sport
- Sport: Rowing
Medal record
Men's rowing
Representing New Zealand
British Empire Games
Gold medal – first place	1950 Auckland	Coxed four

George Edward Johnson (1 May 1924 – 19 July 1985) was a New Zealand representative rower.

At the 1950 British Empire Games he won the gold medal as part of the men's coxed four. At the 1952 Summer Olympics he competed as part of the coxed four again, but the crew did not make the final.
