= Graham Avery =

New Zealand cyclist

Personal information
- Full name: Graham Russell Avery
- Born: 9 September 1929 Point Chevalier, New Zealand
- Died: 14 March 2015 (aged 85) Pukekohe, New Zealand
Medal record
Men's Track cycling
Representing New Zealand
Commonwealth Games
Bronze medal – third place	1950 Auckland	Sprint

Graham Russell Avery (9 September 1929 – 14 March 2015) was a New Zealand racing cyclist.

== Biography ==
Avery was born in 1929 in the Auckland suburb of Point Chevalier. His parents were Muriel Mary Russell (née Lindsay) and Norman West Avery, a carpenter.

He won the bronze medal in the men's sprint at the 1950 British Empire Games in Auckland.

He died on 14 March 2015.
