= Winifred Griffin =

New Zealand swimmer

Winifred Ashby
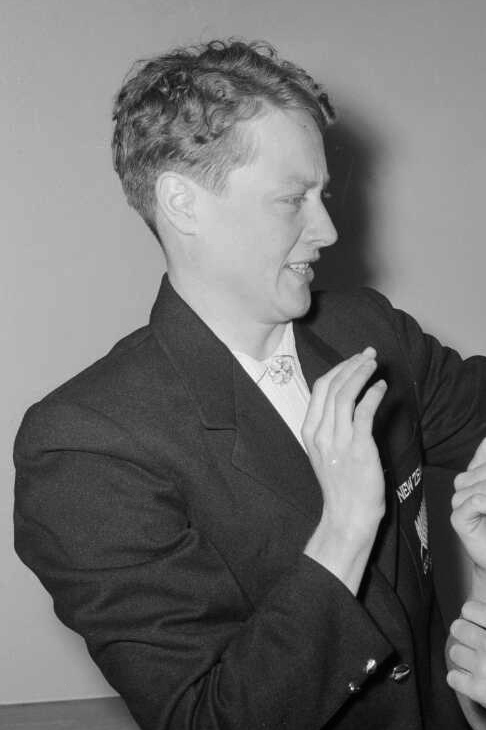
- Griffin in 1956

Personal information
- Born: Winifred Clare Griffin; 17 November 1932 Kawakawa, New Zealand
- Died: 11 December 2018 (aged 86) Hibiscus Coast, New Zealand
- Spouse: Kerry Ashby (died 2015)
- Relative: Murray Ashby (brother-in-law)

Sport
- Country: New Zealand
- Sport: Swimming

Achievements and titles
- National finals: 220 yards freestyle champion (1951, 1953, 1955, 1957); 440 yards freestyle champion (1951, 1953, 1954, 1955, 1957)
Medal record
Representing New Zealand
Women's swimming
British Empire Games
Silver medal – second place	1950 Auckland	4 × 110 yd freestyle relay

Winifred Clare "Winkie" Ashby (née Griffin; 17 November 1932 – 11 December 2018) was a New Zealand freestyle swimmer. At the 1950 British Empire Games she won the silver medal as part of the 4 × 110 yards freestyle relay. She was also a member of the New Zealand 3 × 100 yards medley relay team that was disqualified. Individually she placed fourth in the 440 yards freestyle and sixth in the 110 yards freestyle. She also competed in the 440 and 110 yards freestyle at the 1954 British Empire and Commonwealth Games.

Her only Olympic Games appearance was in 1956 at Melbourne where she swam 100 m and 400 m freestyle, and was eliminated in the heats.

Griffin won nine New Zealand national swimming titles: the 220 yards freestyle in 1951, 1953, 1955 and 1957; and the 440 yards freestyle in 1951, 1953, 1954, 1955, and 1957.

She was married to rower Kerry Ashby, who died in 2015. Winifred Ashby died of cancer on the Hibiscus Coast, north of Auckland, on 11 December 2018.
