= Aquatics at the 1950 British Empire Games =

- Venue: Newmarket Olympic Pool
- Location: Auckland, New Zealand
- Dates: 4 – 11 February 1950

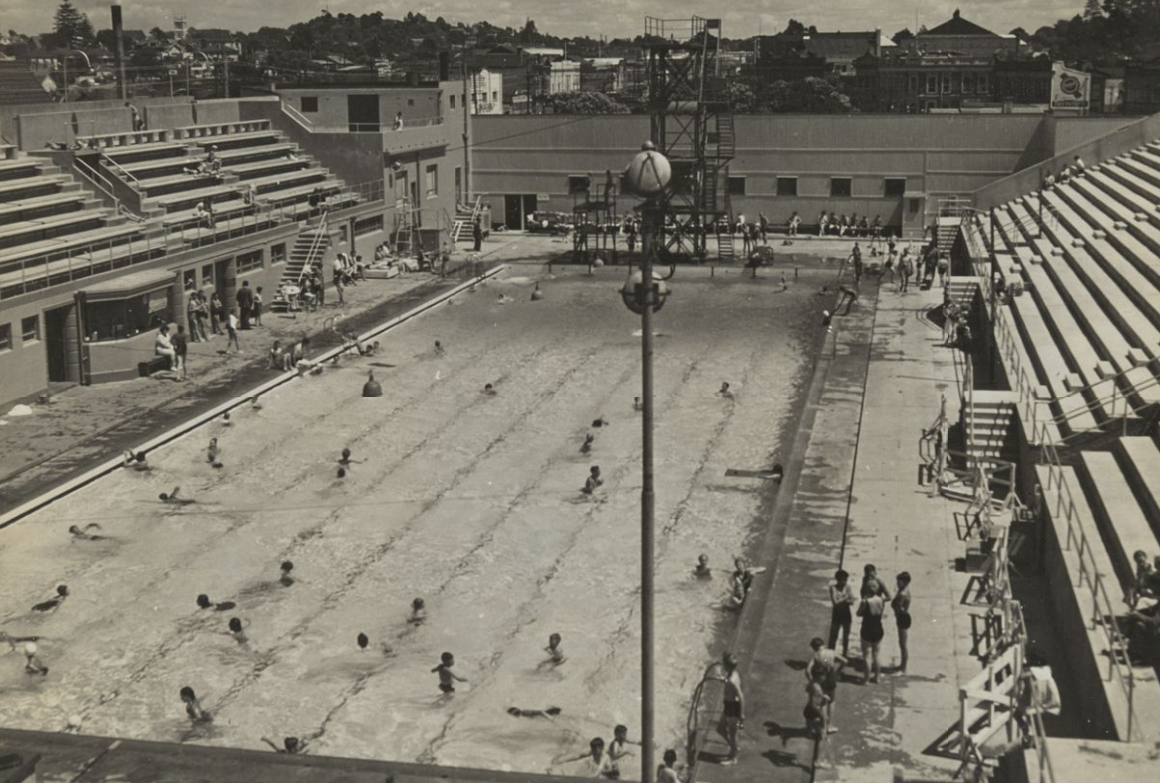
The Newmarket Olympic Pool in January 1950. Auckland Libraries Heritage Collections

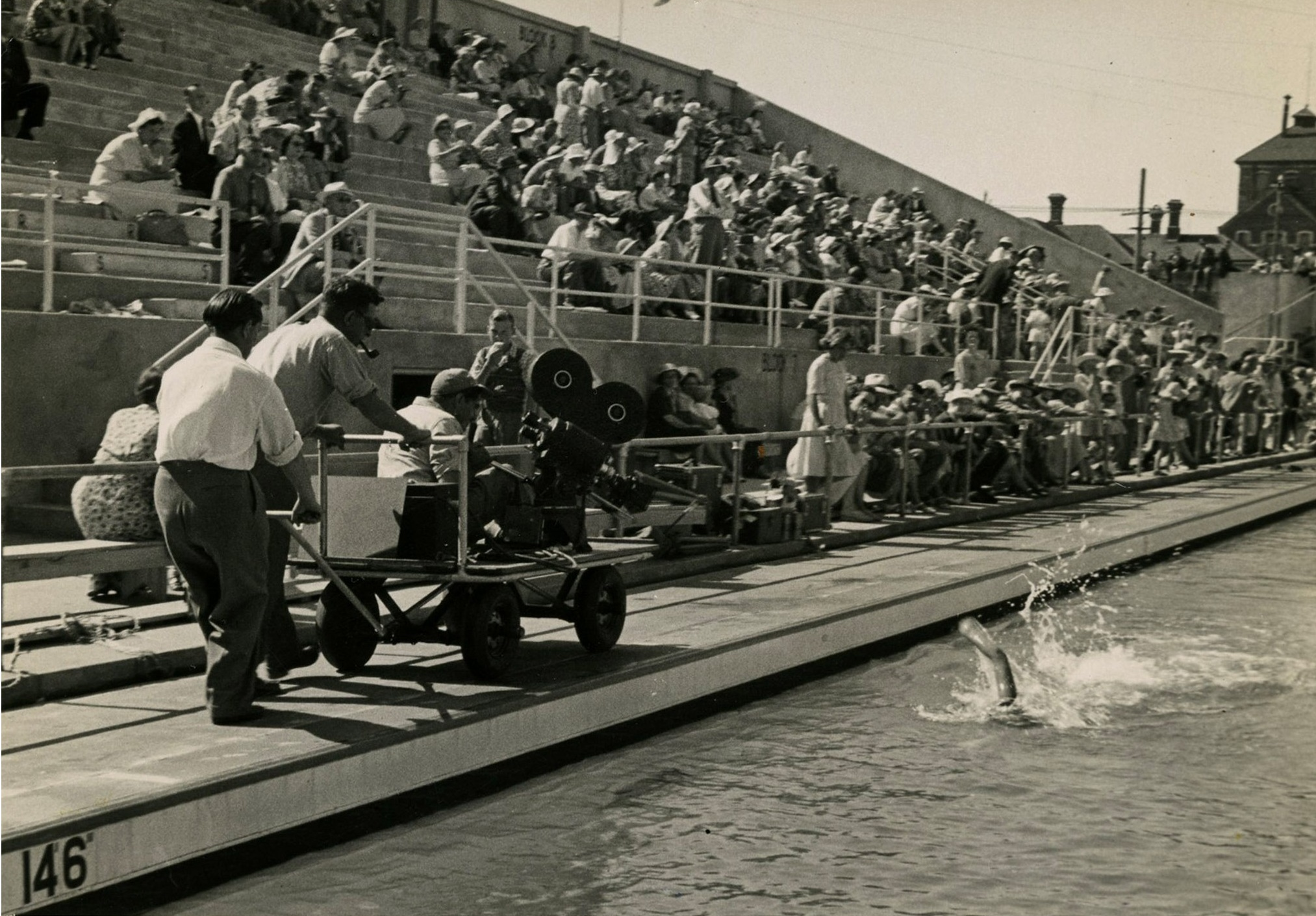
Filming at the Newmarket Olympic Pool

Aquatics at the 1950 British Empire Games made its fourth appearance at the Commonwealth Games with both Swimming at the Commonwealth Games and Diving at the Commonwealth Games being included again. Water Polo at the Commonwealth Games made its debut but only featured two nations.

There were four diving events and 13 swimming events contested. The events were held at the Newmarket Olympic Pool, which had been built in 1939. The water polo venue was originally advertised as being held at the Shelly Beach Baths but it is unclear as to whether this venue was used.

Australia topped the medal table with seven gold medals.

== Medal table ==
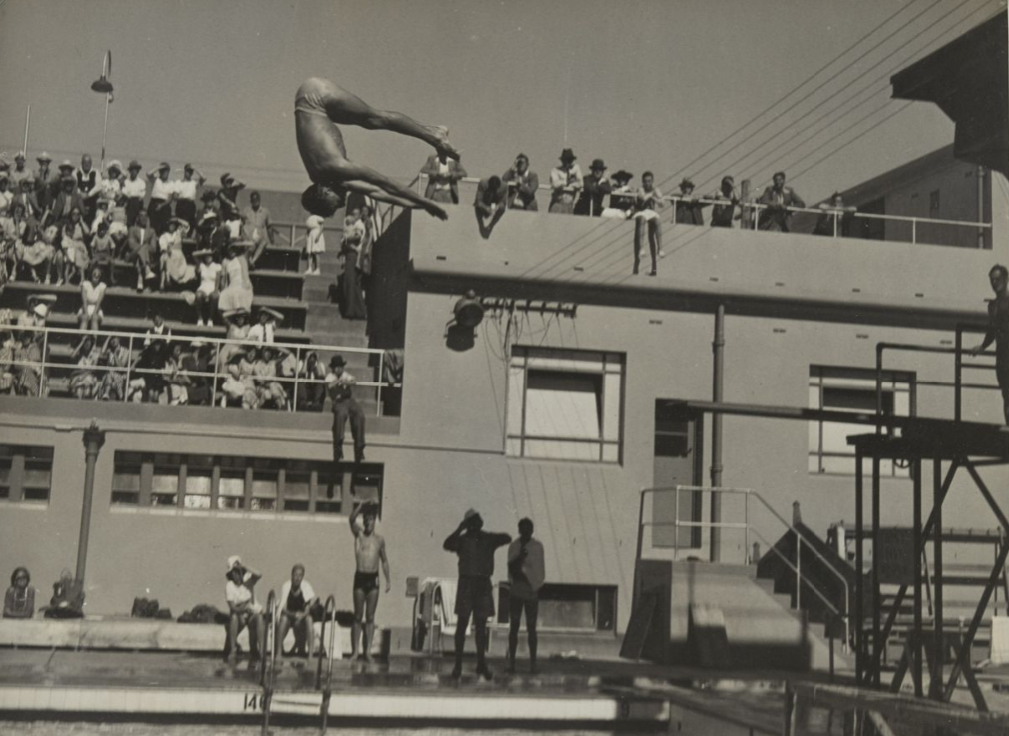
George Athans in action during the Games. Auckland Libraries Heritage Collections

* Host nation (New Zealand)

Medals won by nation with totals, ranked by number of golds—sortable
Rank	Nation	Gold	Silver	Bronze	Total
1	Australia (AUS)	7	5	4	16
2	England (ENG)	3	4	5	12
3	South Africa (SAF)	3	1	1	5
4	Canada (CAN)	2	3	1	6
5	Scotland (SCO)	2	1	2	5
6	New Zealand (NZL)*	1	3	4	8
7	Wales (WAL)	0	1	0	1
Totals (7 entries)		18	18	17	53

== Medal summary ==
=== Diving ===
==== Men's events ====
Event	Gold	Silver	Bronze
3 m springboard	George Athans (CAN)	Peter Heatly (SCO)	Jack Stewart (NZL)
10 m platform	Peter Heatly (SCO)	George Athans (CAN)	Frank Murphy (AUS)

==== Women's events ====
Event	Gold	Silver	Bronze
3 m springboard	Edna Child (ENG)	Noeline MacLean (AUS)	Lynda Hunt (CAN)
10 m platform	Edna Child (ENG)	Gwen Fawcett (AUS)	Noeline MacLean (AUS)

=== Swimming ===
==== Men's events ====
Event	Gold	Silver	Bronze
110 yd freestyle	Peter Salmon (CAN)	Frank O'Neill (AUS)	Pat Kendall (ENG)
440 yd freestyle	Garrick Agnew (AUS)	(South Africa) Graham Johnston (SAF)	Buddy Lucas (NZL)
1650 yd freestyle	(South Africa) Graham Johnston (SAF)	Jim Portelance (CAN)	Buddy Lucas (NZL)
110 yd backstroke	(South Africa) Jackie Wiid (SAF)	John Brockway (WAL)	Bert Kinnear (SCO)
220 yd breaststroke	David Hawkins (AUS)	Roy Romain (ENG)	Ronald Russell Sharpe (AUS)
4×220 yd freestyle relay	New Zealand; Buddy Lucas; Lyall Barry; Michael Amos; Noel Chambers	Australia; Barrie Kellaway; Garrick Agnew; Frank O'Neill; James Beard	England; Donald Bland; Jack Hale; Pat Kendall; Ray Legg
3×110 yd medley relay	England; Jack Hale; Pat Kendall; Roy Romain	Canada; Allen Gilchrist; Lucien Beaumont; Peter Salmon	New Zealand; John Shanahan; Lyall Barry; Peter Mathieson

==== Women's events ====
Event	Gold	Silver	Bronze
110 yd freestyle	Marjorie McQuade (AUS)	Margaret Wellington (ENG)	(South Africa) Joan Harrison (SAF)
440 yd freestyle	(South Africa) Joan Harrison (SAF)	Margaret Wellington (ENG)	Denise Norton (AUS)
110 yd backstroke	Judy-Joy Davies (AUS)	Jean Stewart (NZL)	Helen Yate (ENG)
220 yd breaststroke	Elenor Gordon (SCO)	Nancy Lyons (AUS)	Elizabeth Church (ENG)
4×110 yd freestyle relay	Australia; Denise Spencer; Denise Norton; Judy-Joy Davies; Marjorie McQuade	New Zealand; Joan Hastings; Kristin Jacobi; Norma Bridson; Winifred Griffin	England; Grace Wood; Helen Yate; Lillian Preece; Margaret Wellington
3×110 yd medley relay	Australia; Judy-Joy Davies; Marjorie McQuade; Nancy Lyons	England; Elizabeth Church; Helen Yate; Margaret Wellington	Scotland; Betty Turner; Elenor Gordon; Margaret Girvan

=== Water polo ===
Event	Gold	Silver	Bronze
Tournament	Australia; John Amadee; Peter Bennett; Bruce Bourke; John Bourke; Herman Doerner; Owen Doerner; Ronald Faulds; Colin French; Kevin Hallett; Malcolm Hastie; Percy Johnston; James McKay; Francis Murphy; Frank O'Neill	New Zealand; Charles Brown; Jim Cameron; Terry Harris; Bob Hatchwell; Barrie Hutchinson; Tom Logan; Edward Raven; Jim Walsh; Neil Williams; Wally Williams	none awarded

== Finals (men) ==
=== 3 m springboard ===
Pos	Athlete	Pts
1	(Canada) George Athans	169.21
2	(Scotland) Peter Heatly	168.80
3	(New Zealand) Jack Stewart	168.17
4	(Australia) Joseph McCann	159.76
5	(Australia) Ron Faulds	148.86
6	(Southern Rhodesia) I. Grace	148.57
7	(Australia) David Norris	140.20
8	(Dominion of Ceylon) A. Smith	135.36

=== 10 m platform ===
Pos	Athlete	Pts
1	(Scotland) Peter Heatly	156.07
2	(Canada) George Athans	145.36
3	(Australia) Frank Murphy	129.40
4	(Australia) Joseph McCann	128.72
5	(Australia) John Kevin Bourke	124.14
6	(New Zealand) W. Owen Jaine	115.28

=== 110 yd freestyle ===
Pos	Athlete	Time
1	(Canada) Peter Salmon	1:00.4
2	(Australia) Frank O'Neill	1:00.6
3	(England) Pat Kendall	1:01.8
4	(Canada) Lucien Beaumont	1:02.1
5	(South Africa) Jackie Wiid	1:02.3
6	(New Zealand) Michael Amos	1:02.5

=== 440 yd freestyle ===
Pos	Athlete	Time
1	(Australia) Garrick Agnew	4:49.4
2	(South Africa) Graham Johnston	4:51.3
3	(New Zealand) Buddy Lucas	5:02.5
4	(Australia) Barrie Edwin Kellaway	5:03.5
5	(New Zealand) Michael Amos	5:08.1
6	(England) Donald Bland	5:10.5

=== 1650 yd freestyle ===
Pos	Athlete	Time
1	(South Africa) Graham Johnston	19:55.7
2	(Canada) Jim Portelance	20:08.3
3	(New Zealand) Buddy Lucas	20:10.1
4	(England) Donald Bland	20:18.5
5	(Australia) Barrie Edwin Kellaway	20:35.2
6	(New Zealand) Noel Chambers or Colin Chambers	21:45.3

=== 110 yd backstroke ===
Pos	Athlete	Time
1	(South Africa) Jackie Wiid	1:07.7
2	(Wales) John Brockway	1:08.0
3	(Scotland) Bert Kinnear	1:10.8
4	(New Zealand) Peter Mathieson	1:13.5
5	(Australia) Frank Stevens	1:13.6
6	(Canada) Peter Salmon	dnf

=== 220 yd breaststroke ===
Pos	Athlete	Time
1	(Australia) David Hawkins	2:54.1
2	(England) Roy Romain	2:54.2
3	(Australia) Ronald Russell Sharpe	2:56.0
4	(New Zealand) John Shanahan	2:59.8
5	(New Zealand) Trevor Eagle	3:02.9
6	(New Zealand) Colin Callan	3:09.8

=== 4×220 yd freestyle relay ===
Pos	Athlete	Time
1	(New Zealand) Buddy Lucas, Lyall Barry, Michael Amos, Noel Chambers	9:27.7
2	(Australia) Barrie Kellaway, Garrick Agnew, Frank O'Neill, James Beard	9:34.5
3	(England) Donald Bland, Jack Hale, Pat Kendall, Ray Legg	9:36.8
3	(Canada) Allen Gilchrist, Jim Portelance, George Portelance, Peter Salmon	9:44.4

=== 3×110 yd medley relay ===
Pos	Athlete	Time
1	(England) Jack Hale, Pat Kendall, Roy Romain	3:26.6
2	(Canada) Allen Gilchrist, Lucien Beaumont, Peter Salmon	3:29.4
3	(New Zealand) John Shanahan, Lyall Barry, Peter Mathieson	3:30.1
4	(Australia) Frank O'Neill (swimmer), Ronald Russell Sharpe, Frank Stevens	3:32.4

=== Water polo ===
Game 1

4 February 1950	New Zealand	4–11	Australia	Newmarket Olympic Pool
4 February 1950	Hatchwell 2, Logan, W. Williams	Goals	Amadee 4, Johnston 2, French, Bennett, Doerner, Hastie, own goal	Newmarket Olympic Pool

Game 2

6 February 1950	New Zealand	2–13	Australia	Newmarket Olympic Pool
6 February 1950		Goals	Amadee 4, Bennett 5, Johnston 2, Hastie 2	Newmarket Olympic Pool

Game 3

10 February 1950	New Zealand	2–5	Australia	Newmarket Olympic Pool
10 February 1950		Goals		Newmarket Olympic Pool

== Finals (women) ==
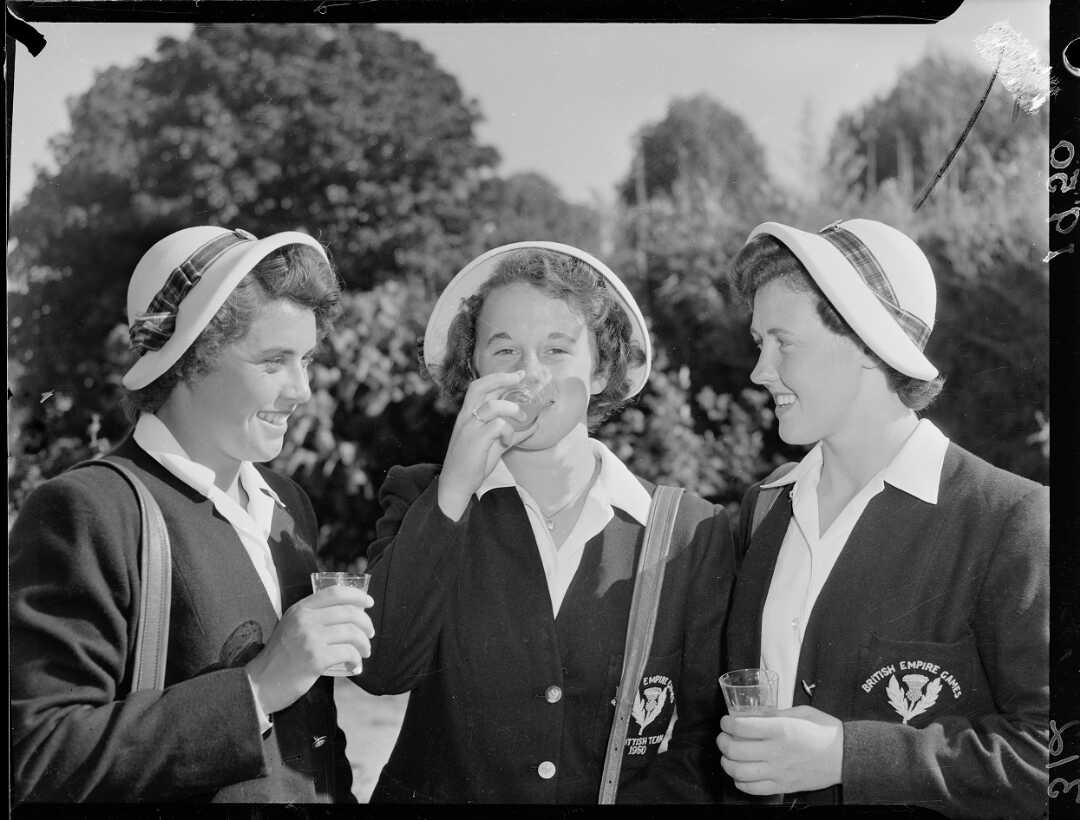
The Scottish women's swinning team, (LtoR) Betty Turner, Helen Gordon, and Margaret Girvan

=== 3 m springboard ===
Pos	Athlete	Pts
1	(England) Edna Child	126.58
2	(Australia) Noeline MacLean	124.59
3	(Canada) Lynda Hunt	115.38
4	(Canada) E. Buchanan	106.15
5	(Australia) Patricia May Barnett	104.55
6	(New Zealand) Mayzod Reid	104.29
7	(New Zealand) Joyce Carpenter	95.88
8	(New Zealand) Betty Moore	93.30

=== 10 m platform ===
Pos	Athlete	Pts
1	(England) Edna Child	70.89
2	(Australia) Gwen Fawcett	65.64
3	(Australia) Noeline MacLean	59.93
4	(Canada) E. Buchanan	54.98
5	(Canada) Lynda Hunt	46.21

=== 110 yd freestyle ===
Pos	Athlete	Time
1	(Australia) Marjorie McQuade	1:09.0
2	(England) Margaret Wellington	1:09.6
3	(South Africa) Joan Harrison	1:10.7
4	(Australia) Denise Spencer	1:10.7
5	(New Zealand) Norma Bridson	1:11.2
6	(New Zealand) Winifred Griffin	1:11.9

=== 440 yd freestyle ===
Pos	Athlete	Time
1	(South Africa) Joan Harrison	5:26.4
2	(England) Margaret Wellington	5:33.7
3	(Australia) Denise Norton	5:33.8
4	(New Zealand) Winifred Griffin	5:39.4
5	(Australia) Judy-Joy Davies	5:39.4
6	(England) Lillian Preece	5:46.0

=== 110 yd backstroke ===
Pos	Athlete	Time
1	(Australia) Judy-Joy Davies	1:18.6
2	(New Zealand) Jean Stewart	1:19.1
3	(England) Helen Yate	1:20.5
4	(Australia) Jeanette Catherine Holle	1:22.0
5	(Scotland) Margaret Girvan	1:23.2
6	(Australia) Patricia Isabelle Seymour	1:23.5

=== 220 yd breaststroke ===
Pos	Athlete	Time
1	(Scotland) Elenor Gordon	3:01.7
2	(Australia) Nancy Lyons	3:03.6
3	(England) Elizabeth Church	3:10.3
4	(Canada) Irene Strong	3:17.0
5	(Australia) Beryl Joan Hosking	3:21.9
6	(New Zealand) Margaret Sweeney	3:28.0

=== 4×110 yd freestyle relay ===
Pos	Athlete	Time
1	(Australia) Denise Spencer, Denise Norton, Judy-Joy Davies, Marjorie McQuade	4:44.9
2	(New Zealand) Joan Hastings, Kristin Jacobi, Norma Bridson, Winifred Griffin	4:48.7
3	(England) Grace Wood, Helen Yate, Lillian Preece, Margaret Wellington	4:56.0
4	(Canada) Catherine Miles, Irene Strong, Joan Morgan, Kay McNamee	5:02.4

=== 3×110 yd medley relay ===
Pos	Athlete	Time
1	(Australia) Judy-Joy Davies, Marjorie McQuade, Nancy Lyons	3:53.8
2	(England) Elizabeth Church, Helen Yate, Margaret Wellington	3:56.6
3	(Scotland) Betty Turner, Elenor Gordon, Margaret Girvan	3:58.9
4	(Canada) Catherine Miles, Irene Strong, Joan Morgan	4:05.5
5	(New Zealand) Jean Stewart, Margaret Sweeney, Winifred Griffin	disq
