= Judy-Joy Davies =

Australian swimmer (1928–2016)

Personal information
- Full name: Judith Joy Davies
- Nickname: "Judy-Joy"
- National team: Australia
- Born: 5 June 1928 Melbourne, Victoria
- Died: 27 March 2016 (aged 87)

Sport
- Sport: Swimming
- Strokes: Backstroke, freestyle, medley
Medal record
Women's swimming
Representing Australia
Summer Olympics
Bronze medal – third place	1948 London	100 m backstroke
Commonwealth Games
Gold medal – first place	1950 Auckland	110 yd backstroke
Gold medal – first place	1950 Auckland	4×110 yd freestyle
Gold medal – first place	1950 Auckland	3×110 yd medley

Judith Joy Davies (5 June 1928 – 27 March 2016) was an Australian backstroke swimmer of the 1940s and 1950s, who won a bronze medal in the 100-metre backstroke at the 1948 Summer Olympics in London. At the national level, she won 17 Australian championships in freestyle, backstroke and medley swimming. She was well known after her swimming career as a long-time sporting journalist for the Melbourne newspapers The Argus and The Sun-News Pictorial.

The Second World War did not interrupt her competitive swimming career.

At international level, Davies concentrated on the backstroke, winning seven consecutive national titles from 1946 to 1952. She also won the 100-yard freestyle in 1947 and the 880-yard freestyle the following year. At the 1948 Olympics, Davies set an Olympic record in the heat of the 100m backstroke. However, in the final, she finished behind Denmark's Karen Harup and the United States' Suzanne Zimmerman.

Two years later at the 1950 British Empire Games in Auckland, Davies won three gold medals. She first won the 110-yard backstroke and then teamed up with Denise Spencer, Denise Norton and Marjorie McQuade to win the 4×110-yard freestyle relay. Finally, Davies with McQuade and Nancy Lyons won the 3×110-yard medley relay.

At the 1952 Summer Olympics in Helsinki, Davies switched to the 400-metre freestyle, but she disappointed, managing only ninth place.

Davies was inducted into the Sport Australia Hall of Fame in 2011.

== See also ==
- List of Australian Olympic medallists in swimming
- List of Olympic medalists in swimming (women)
- Women's swimming in Australia

== Bibliography ==
- Stell, Marion K. (1991). Half the Race, A history of Australian women in sport. North Ryde, Australia: HarperCollins. ISBN 0-207-16971-3.
- Andrews, Malcolm (2000). Australia at the Olympic Games. Sydney, New South Wales: ABC Books. p. 125. ISBN 0-7333-0884-8.
