= Michael Amos (swimmer) =

New Zealand swimmer

Personal information
- Full name: William Michael Amos
- Born: 12 August 1932 Auckland, New Zealand
- Died: 14 April 2003 (aged 70) Auckland, New Zealand

Sport
- Country: New Zealand
- Sport: Swimming
- Event: Freestyle
- Club: North Shore Swimming Club

Achievements and titles
- National finals: 100 yd freestyle champion (1952, 1953, 1955); 220 yd freestyle champion (1950, 1952)
Medal record
Men's swimming
Representing New Zealand
British Empire Games
Gold medal – first place	1950 Auckland	4 × 220 yd freestyle relay

William Michael Amos (12 August 1932 – 14 April 2003) was a New Zealand swimmer. He won a gold medal at the 1950 British Empire Games, and five New Zealand national swimming titles in the early 1950s.

== Early life and family ==
Born in the Auckland suburb of Ponsonby on 12 August 1932, Amos was the son of Arthur Malcolm Amos and Kathleen Mary Amos (née Booth). He was educated at Takapuna Grammar School.

== Swimming ==
=== Early career ===
A member of the North Shore Swimming Club, Amos came to national attention in September 1946, when he broke the New Zealand junior boys' record for the 440 yards freestyle by 14.8 seconds, recording a time of 5:32.2. A week later, he broke the national junior 220 yards freestyle record at the Tepid Baths in Auckland, with a time of 2:36.1, surpassing the previous record by 0.4 seconds.

=== 1949 ===
In early 1949, Amos swam 440 yards freestyle in 5:13.4, to break the national intermediate boys' record previously held by Noel Crump by 1.4 seconds. Amos then won five titles at the 1949 New Zealand junior swimming championships held in Napier: the 100 yards, 220 yards and 440 yards freestyle; and the 100 yards and 220 yards backstroke. Later that year, in August, Amos lowered the national junior 880 yards freestyle record by 23 seconds, recording a time of 10:51.8, which was 0.2 seconds outside the New Zealand senior record for the distance held by Colin Chambers. The following week, he broke both the national junior and senior records for the 220 yards freestyle, held by Noel Crump and Noel Chambers, respectively, with a time of 2:18.8. In September 1949, Amos set new national junior records of 1:06.0 for the 100 yards backstroke, and 2:46.2 for the 220 yards backstroke. In November 1949, he unofficially recorded 54.0 seconds for 100 yards freestyle as the final leg of a relay. Amos broke his own New Zealand national record for the 220 yards freestyle by 4.8 seconds in December 1949, covering the distance in 2:14.0.

=== 1950 ===
At the New Zealand national swimming championships held in Auckland in January 1950, Amos won the 220 yards freestyle title in a time of 2:20.0, a championship record. He finished second in the 100 yards freestyle final, touched out by the winner, Lyall Barry, who recorded a time of 55.4 seconds. Amos was also second in the 440 yards freestyle, finishing three yards behind Buddy Lucas who took the title in a time of 5:03.4.

Representing New Zealand at the 1950 British Empire Games in Auckland, Amos won a gold medal in the men's 880 yards freestyle relay, alongside Lyall Barry, Noel Chambers and Buddy Lucas. He also competed in the 110 yards and 440 yards freestyle events. Amos qualified for the final of the 110 yards freestyle with a time of 1:01.9 in his heat, making him the sixth-fastest qualifier; in the final he swam 1:02.5 to finish sixth. In the 440 yards freestyle, he progressed to the final as the sixth-fastest qualifier with a time of 5:06.1, and then recorded a time of 5:08.1 in the final to place fifth.

=== Later career ===
Amos won a further four New Zealand national swimming titles: the 100 yards freestyle in 1952, 1953, and 1955; and the 220 yards freestyle in 1952.

== Death ==
Amos died at a private hospital in Te Atatū South on 14 April 2003.

== See also ==
- List of Commonwealth Games medallists in swimming (men)
