= Women's swimming in Australia =

While not being urged to avoid competition, women had few opportunities to compete in sport in Australia until the 1880s. After that date, new sporting facilities were being built around the country and many new sport clubs were created. For swimming, the rapid expansion of facilities took place during the 1880s and the 1890s. Compared to the past when the whole of the swimming community was made up of males, currently 55 percent of the Australian swimming membership is made up of women. Not only do females dominate swimming in the pool but there are more than 5,500 female coaches in the swimming world in Australian and over 2,000 female technical officials.

== History ==
=== 1800s ===
During the middle part of the 1800s, swimming in Australia was segregated by sex. The times and facilities allocated to women at existing swimming clubs were inferior to those of their male counterparts. Australian women were forced by men to wear swim costumes that covered them up in order to prevent men from staring at them in a suggestive manner.

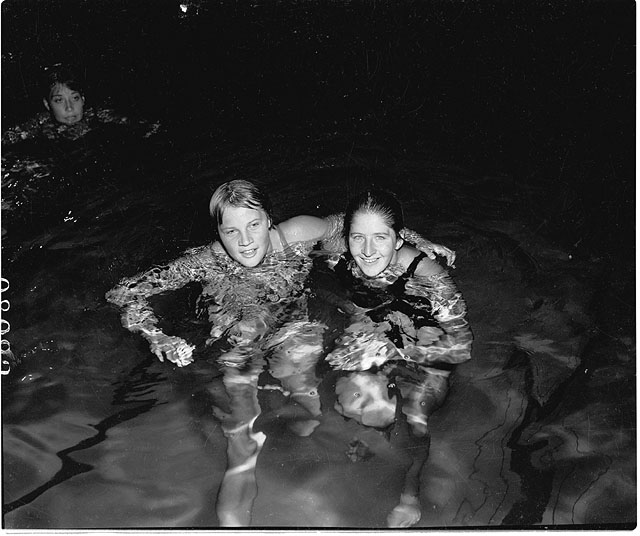
Dawn Fraser and Ilsa Konrads at the Australian National Swimming Championships

=== 1860s ===
In 1867, two international women swimmers visited Australia: Alice Moon and Elphinstone Dick. Dick had set an English swimming distance record when she swam from Shoreham to Brighton, a distance of 10 kilometres (6.2 mi) in less than ideal weather. Dick stayed in Melbourne, Victoria for two years and taught many women how to swim.

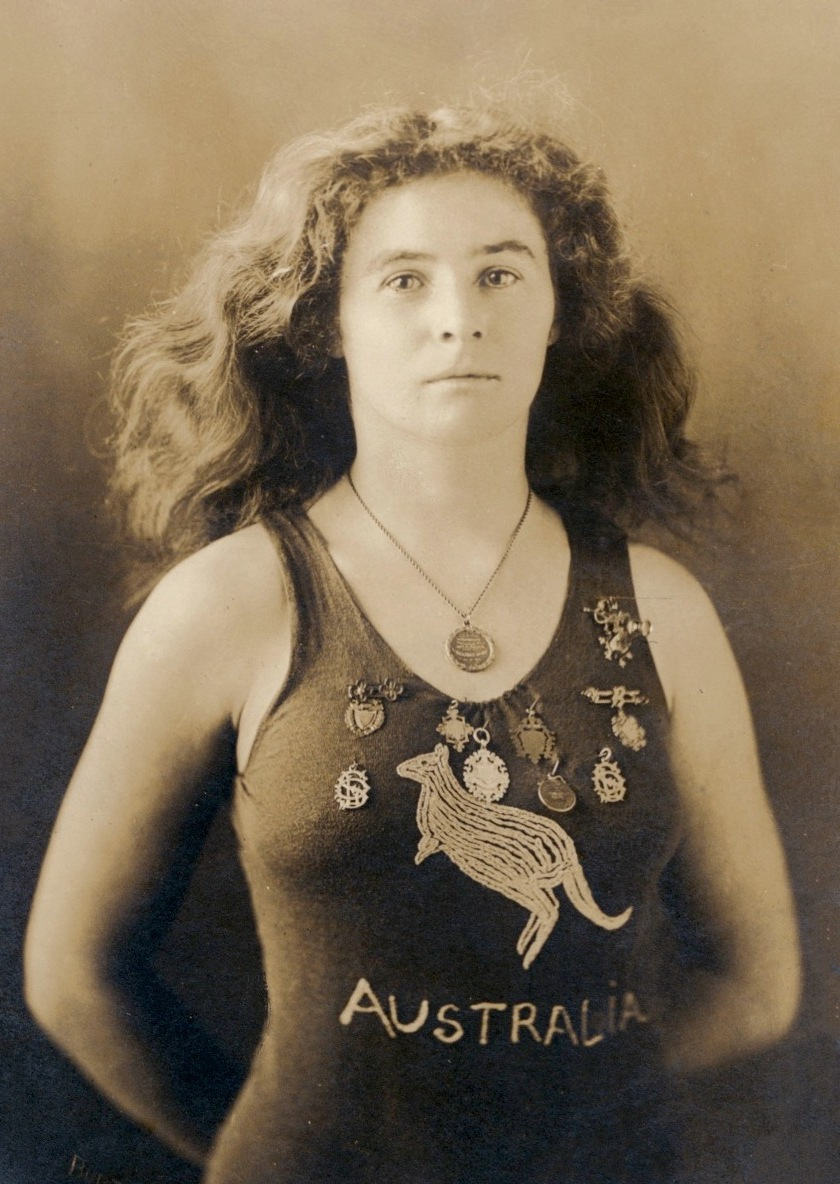
Beatrice Kerr was billed as "Australia's Champion Lady Swimmer and Diver" and helped inspire other women to participate swimming.

=== 1900s ===
On 12 March 1904 a 12-year-old schoolgirl, J Hill, won the 50 yards event at what was described as the first carnival of the Australian Swimming Championships, held in Sydney at Rushcutters Bay. In the same year a swim carnival exclusively for women was held at the Booroodabin Baths in Brisbane.

During this period, women in Australia wore swim suits that covered themselves from knee to the neck. Another early swim carnival for women in Queensland was organised in 1907 in Toowoomba. One of the teams competing in it was the Brisbane City Club, featuring a relay team with V. Nichol, F. Carr, B. Chapman and M. Mahoney.

During the 1900s, a number of publicly recognised female swimmers emerged, engaging in swimming and diving exhibitions as well as competitive swimming. These notably included Annette Kellerman and Beatrice Kerr, who was billed as "Australia's Champion Lady Swimmer and Diver" and inspired others to follow their example.

Swimming was a popular women's spectator sport in Queensland during the 1900s. Women attended many swimming events including ones held at the baths in Brisbane. A popular swimming location for Queensland women during the 1900s and 1910s was the water around Wellington Point. During this period, some popular swimming locations, like Yeppon's beach, had sheds for women to change in. These sheds prevented men from looking at women while they changed into their bathing costume. Swimming was a sport enjoyed in rural, bush areas in Australia during the 1900s. The local waterhole was used for swimming and cooling down during the warm summers, but was more often a place for men and women to congregate and socialise.

=== 1910s ===
On 15 July 1912, at the Stockholm Olympics, Fanny Durack became the first Australian to win a swimming event on a world stage and first Australian female to win an Olympic gold medal. At the meet she won the 100m in a time of 1 minute and 25 seconds, just beating fellow Australian Mina Wylie. Miss Durack and Miss Wylie had been training for the London Olympics in the same year. Unfortunately restrictions were put in place during the Olympics to make sure that women could not compete in events that men were also competing in. This meant that the girls had to pull out of the Olympics and decided instead to enter the 100m event, the only event open to females at the time, at the Stockholm Olympics. Around the mid-1910s, women faced similar participation barriers that women in other sports like golf faced during the same period. These restrictions included reduced times in which to swim, changing areas and lack of comparable facilities that men had. By 1914, women were beginning to speak out in Queensland about these conditions asking for greater access to the facilities or new women only facilities to be built. The government complied in some cases and some pools began to ease restrictions on female usage of the facilities. The giving in on the part of swimming officials was because of recognition about the importance of physical activity for women's physical and psychological health.

=== 1920s ===
In 1922, a committee in Australia investigated the benefits of physical education for girls. They came up with several recommendations regarding what sports were and were not appropriate for girls to play based on the level of fitness required. It was determined that for some individual girls that for medical reasons, the girls should probably not be allowed to participate in tennis, netball, lacrosse, golf, hockey, and cricket. Soccer was completely medically inappropriate for girls to play. It was medically appropriate for all girls to be able to participate in, so long as they were not done in an overly competitive manner, swimming, rowing, cycling and horseback riding. One of Australia's best swimmers in the first part of the twentieth century was Mabel Springfield. She was selected for the 1920 Summer Olympics but could not go. She went to the 1928 Summer Olympics as a chaperone for the Australian women's swim team.

=== 1930s ===
In 1934, the Victorian Women's Centennial Sports Carnival was held. The event was organised by the Victorian Women's Amateur Sports Council and held at the Melbourne Cricket Grounds. The purpose was to increase women's interest in sport by providing them opportunities to play. Sports that were included on the programme included cricket, field hockey, women's basketball, bowls, rowing, swimming, athletics, rifle shooting, baseball, golf, tennis and badminton. There were over 1,000 bowlers involved over the course a week. Cricket featured a match versus a visiting English side. Women's basketball featured a Victorian side playing against a representative all Australian side. There was a day for watersports such as swimming and rowing. A tennis tournament was held. A field hockey tournament featuring Australian, Kiwi and Fijian teams was played.

=== 1940s ===
The second World War was disruptive to women's swimming in Australia. Some swimmers players, such as Rhoda Cavill, quit competitive swimming during the war. Others, such as Judy Joy Davies Evelyn De Lacy continued. De Lacy's only break came in the period around the birth of her child. Australian women's sports had an advantage over many other women's sport organisations around the world in the period after World War II. Women's sport organisations had largely remained intact and were holding competitions during the war period. This structure survived in the post war period. Women's sport were not hurt because of food rationing, petrol rationing, population disbursement, and other issues facing post-war Europe.

=== 1990s ===
Australian women like Shelly Taylor-Smith and Susan Maroney were beating Australian male competitors in long distance swim races.

=== 2000s ===
2000 was a major year for sports in Australia where they held the 2000 Olympic Games. There games were also the celebration of 100 years of women's participation in the Olympic Games. Some achievements include Susie O’Neill who won the women's 200m freestyle and silver in the 200m butterfly, Leisel Jones got silver in the 100m breaststroke, Petria Thomas got bronze in the 200m butterfly, the women's 4x200 freestyle relay got silver and the women's 4 × 100 medley got silver.

== Memorable female swimmers ==
- Dawn Fraser
- Susie O’Neill
- Stephanie Rice
- Leisel Jones
- Petria Thomas
- Libby Tricket
- Lorraine Crapp
- Clare Dennis
- Jodie Henry
- Melanie Schlanger
- Emily Seebohm
- Jessicah Shipper
- Bronte Campbell
- Cate Campbell
- Emma McKeon
- Brooke Hanson
- Joanne Griggs

== Participation ==
In 1940, a study of 314 women in New Zealand and Australia was done. Most of the women in the study were middle class, conservative, Protestant and white. The study found that 183 participated in sport. The fourth most popular sport that these women participated in was swimming, with 25 having participated in the sport.

Swimming is one of Australia's sports with the highest rates of participation by women. A total of 11.8% of Australian women regularly swim. This is behind only walking and aerobics.

For more than 100 years, swimming has provided Australian women the chance to make their mark on the international and national stage, with not many other sports allowing females to compete in. In the latest National Team, female competitors made up 55 per cent of the team and in the communities there are more than 5000 female coaches and more than 2000 female officials.

== International ==
Australia has a long history of sending competitors to international events.

=== Commonwealth and Empire Games ===
In 1935, a decision was made to allow women to compete in the 1938 Empire Games. The decision was made that year that the Australians were to host the event and they were the ones who would determine what events would be competed. The women's events that were to be included were swimming and athletics, events that Australia was to dominate in.

During the 1950s, Australian women dominated the swimming competitions at the Empire Games. The most famous of these swimmers were Marjory McQuade, Lorraine Crapp and Dawn Fraser.

=== Olympics ===
The first Olympic gold medal to be officially awarded to a woman at any Olympics was the Australian swimmer, Fanny Durack, who won medal at the 1912 Summer Olympics in the 100 metres (330 ft) freestyle event.

At the 1956 Summer Olympics, an Australian woman won a medal in every women's swimming event held during the games.

At the 1984 Summer Olympics, Suzanne Landells won a silver medal in the 400-metre medley, Karen Phillips won a silver medal in the 200 metres butterfly, and Michelle Pearson won a bronze in the 200-metre medley.

At the 2012 London Olympic Games, despite only winning ten medals in the pool, the Australian women's team performed at a high level. The 4 × 100 m Women's freestyle relay team was the only race in which Australia won a gold medal, with the team composed of Cate Campbell, Alicia Coutts, Brittany Elmslie and Melanie Schlanger. Australian women, also picked up another six medals at the Olympic Games, including four individual medals.

The 2020 Tokyo Olympics, held in 2021, saw Australian women win eight gold medals in the pool including double individual golds for Emma McKeon, Ariarne Titmus and Kaylee McKeown. Overall McKeon won four gold medals and her total of seven medals equalled the record for most medals by a female athlete from any sport at any single Olympic Games.

== See also ==
- List of Australian Olympic medalists in swimming
- Netball in Australia
- Women's association football in Australia
- Women's field hockey in Australia

== Bibliography ==
- Department of Sport, Recreation and Tourism; Australian Sport Commission (1985). Australian Sport, a profile. Canberra, Australia: Australian Government Publish Service. ISBN 0-644-03667-2.
- Evening Post (19 December 1922). "Women in Print". Evening Post. Vol. CC, no. 147. New Zealand: National Library of New Zealand. p. 7.
- Howell, Max; Howell, Reet; Brown, David W. (1989). The Sporting Image, A pictorial history of Queenslanders at play. Brisbane: University of Queensland Press. ISBN 0-7022-2206-2.
- National Centre for Culture and Recreation Statistics (2006). Women's participation in sport and physical activities (PDF) (Report). Canberra, Australia: Australian Bureau of Statistics.
- Stell, Marion K. (1991). Half the Race, A history of Australian women in sport. North Ryde, Australia: HarperCollins. ISBN 0-207-16971-3.
