= Jack Hale (swimmer) =

English competitive swimmer

Personal information
- Nationality: British (English)
- Born: 8 June 1922 Kingston upon Hull, England
- Died: 29 February 2008 (aged 85) Kingston upon Hull, England
- Height: 5 ft 9 in (1.75 m)
- Weight: 128 lb (58 kg)

Sport
- Sport: Swimming
- Strokes: Freestyle
- Club: Hull Kingston Swim Club
Medal record
Men's swimming
Representing England
British Empire Games
Gold medal – first place	1950 Auckland	3×110 yd medley relay
Bronze medal – third place	1950 Auckland	4×220 yd freestyle relay

Jack Irwin Hale (8 June 1922 – 29 February 2008) was an English competitive swimmer who represented Great Britain in the Olympic Games and England in the British Empire Games.

== Biography ==
When London hosted the 1948 Summer Olympics, he competed in three events. His best finish was seventh in the event final of the men's 400-metre freestyle. He also swam in the preliminary heats of the 1,500-metre freestyle and the 4×200-metre freestyle relay, but did not advance in either event.

He represented the English team at the 1950 British Empire Games in Auckland, New Zealand. He won a gold medal as a member of the England's winning team in the men's 3×100-yard medley relay, together with Pat Kendall and Roy Romain. He also received a bronze medal with the third-place English team of Donald Bland, Pat Kendall and Ray Legg in the men's 4×220-yard freestyle relay. Individually, he also competed in the preliminary heats of the 440-yard freestyle event. He won the 1947 and 1948 ASA National Championship 220 yards freestyle title, the 1946, 1947 and 1948 ASA National Championship 440 yards freestyle titles and the 220 yards butterfly title in 1954.

Hale missed the 1952 Summer Olympics, following an accident in which he suffered broken ribs when a diver landed on top of him. Afterward he retired from competitive swimming, and became a swimming instructor and coach in his home-town of Kingston upon Hull, working for nearly 40 years with his wife Valerie, teaching local children to swim.

Hale is widely credited with the development of the dolphin kick in the modern butterfly stroke. Previously competitors had used the breaststroke kick, but Hale noted the rules required only a simultaneous leg action, and integrated the dolphin kick into his stroke, which has since become the recognised stroke.

Jack continued to swim competitively after his retirement from top competition, and was a highly successful Masters swimmer. He was responsible for setting several British and World records for his age group which lasted for many years In 1997 at the ASA masters he set the World, European and British record for 100m Freestyle in the 75-79 age group

He died in Hull in 2008.

== See also ==
- List of Commonwealth Games medallists in swimming (men)
