= Frank Springfield =

Australian swimmer

Personal information
- Full name: Frank Walter Springfield
- Born: 22 August 1887 Queensland, Australia
- Died: 9 July 1958 (aged 70) Queensland, Australia

Sport
- Sport: Swimming
- Strokes: freestyle

Frank Walter Springfield (22 August 1887 – 9 July 1958) was Brisbane-based Australian swimmer. Together with Victorian swimmer Frank Beaurepaire, he competed in three freestyle events at the 1908 Summer Olympics. His races included the half-mile.

The year 1906 saw him win the inaugural Kieran Shield. His brother Sidney 'Sid' Henry Springfield also swam competitively as an amateur. Both were members of the Valley Swimming Club, and Frank was made life member of the Queensland Swimming Association in 1953. Their sister, Mabel, coached dual Olympian Nancy Lyons.
