= Joyce Carpenter =

New Zealand diver and golfer

Joyce Helleur
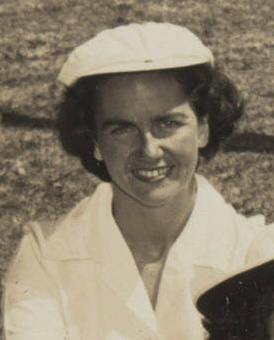
- Carpenter in 1950

Personal information
- Born: Joyce Constance Gladys Carpenter; 15 October 1923
- Died: 9 June 2016 (aged 92)
- Spouse: William Alfred Helleur (m. 1950; died 1982)

Sport
- Country: New Zealand
- Sport: Diving

Achievements and titles
- National finals: Diving champion (1944, 1950)

Joyce Constance Gladys Helleur (née Carpenter, 15 October 1923 − 9 June 2016) was a New Zealand diver, who represented her country at the 1950 British Empire Games.

== Early life and diving career ==
Born Joyce Constance Gladys Carpenter, Helleur was born on 15 October 1923. She took up diving when a junior swimming championship was being held in Nelson: at the suggestion of the pool superintendent, Harry Davy, she entered the diving competition. She went on to win the New Zealand national women's diving championship twice, in 1944 and 1950.

Carpenter worked as a physical education instructor. On 9 January 1950, shortly before the 1950 British Empire Games, she married William Alfred Helleur, an attendant at the Newmarket Olympic Pool in Newmarket, Auckland, just nine days after first meeting him at the national swimming championships.

At the 1950 British Empire Games, she finished seventh in the women's 3 m springboard.

== Later life and death ==
Helleur was involved in the establishment of a new free kindergarten in the Nelson suburb of Tāhunanui in the early 1960s. She also taught children at the King George V Memorial Health Camp in Marsden Valley, Stoke.

An accomplished amateur golfer, Helleur won the Nelson provincial women's match play title in 1968 and 1969.

Helleur died on 9 June 2016.
