= Margaret Wellington =

British swimmer

Personal information
- Born: 23 December 1926 Beckenham, England
- Died: 10 March 2015 (aged 88)

Sport
- Sport: Swimming
- Event: freestyle
- Club: Beckenham Ladies SC
Medal record
Representing England
British Empire Games
Silver medal – second place	1950 Auckland	440y Freestyle
Silver medal – second place	1950 Auckland	110y Freestyle
Silver medal – second place	1950 Auckland	330y Medley Relay
Bronze medal – third place	1950 Auckland	440y Freestyle Relay
Representing Great Britain
European Championships
Bronze medal – third place	1947 Monte Carlo	4×100 m freestyle

Margaret Olive Wellington (23 December 1926 – 10 March 2015) was a British swimmer who competed at the 1948 Summer Olympics.

== Biography ==
Wellington won a bronze medal at the 1947 European Aquatics Championships in the 4 × 100 m freestyle relay. She finished fourth in the same event at the 1948 Summer Olympics.

She won the 1948 ASA National Championship 110 yards freestyle title, the 1949 ASA National Championship 220 yards freestyle title and the 1949 ASA National Championship 440 yards freestyle title.

She represented the English team at the 1950 British Empire Games in Auckland, New Zealand, where she won three silver medals, in the 110 yd and 440 yd freestyle and 3×110 yd medley relay, and a bronze in the 4×110 yd freestyle relay.
