= Betty Moore =

Betty Moore may refer to:

- Betty R. Moore (born 1934), Australian athlete who ran for Great Britain
- Betty Moore (diver) (born 1929), New Zealand diver
- Betty Moore (long jumper) (born 1923), 3rd in the long jump at the 1942 USA Outdoor Track and Field Championships
