= Grace Wood =

British swimmer

Personal information
- Nationality: British (English)
- Born: 19 August 1932 (age 93)

Sport
- Sport: Swimming
- Strokes: freestyle
- Club: Bristol Central SC
Medal record
Swimming
Representing England
British Empire Games
Bronze medal – third place	1950 Auckland	440y Freestyle Relay

Grace Wood (born 19 August 1932) is a British former swimmer who competed at the 1952 Summer Olympics.

== Biography ==
A the 1952 Olympic Games in Helsinki, she competed in the women's 400 metre freestyle.

She represented the English team at the 1950 British Empire Games in Auckland, New Zealand, where she won the bronze medal in the 4×110 yd freestyle relay event.
