= Betty Turner =

Scottish swimmer

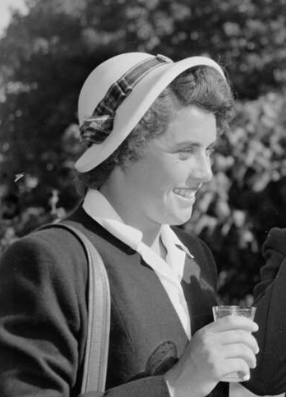
- Turner at the 1950 British Empire Games

Personal information
- Nationality: British (Scottish)
- Born: c.1933

Sport
- Sport: Swimming
- Strokes: Freestyle
- Club: Galashiels ASC
Medal record
Representing Scotland
British Empire and Commonwealth Games
Bronze medal – third place	1950 Auckland	3×110 yd medley

Elizabeth McA Turner (born c.1933) was a Scottish swimmer who competed at the 1950 British Empire Games (now Commonwealth Games).

== Biography ==
Turner came to prominence as a 16-year-old when winning at the 1949 Aquatics GB Swimming Championships and becoming the British 100 yards freestyle champion, in addition to holding the senior and junior Scottish titles.

She swam for the Galashiels Amateur Swimming Club and represented the Scottish team at the 1950 British Empire Games in Auckland, New Zealand, where she won the bronze medal in the 3×110 yd medley relay with Elenor Gordon and Margaret Girvan. At the time of the Games she was living at Wood Street in Galashiels and working as a stenographer.
