= Margaret Girvan =

Scottish swimmer

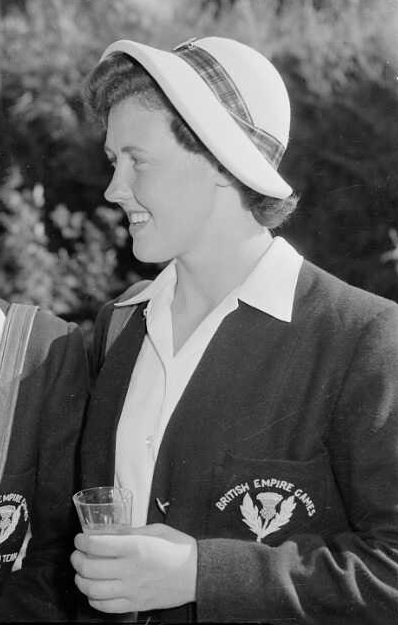
- Girvan at the 1950 British Empire Games

Personal information
- Nationality: British (Scottish)
- Born: 2 October 1932
- Died: 7 January 1979 (aged 46)

Sport
- Sport: Swimming
- Strokes: Freestyle, backstroke
- Club: Motherwell WP & ASC
Medal record
Representing Scotland
British Empire and Commonwealth Games
Bronze medal – third place	1950 Auckland	3×110 yd medley
Gold medal – first place	1954 Vancouver	3×110 yd medley
Bronze medal – third place	1954 Vancouver	440 yd freestyle

Margaret Therese Girvan (2 October 1932 – 7 January 1979) was a Scottish swimmer who competed at the 1956 Summer Olympics and two Commonwealth Games.

== Biography ==
As a schoolgirl in 1944, Girvan won the Motherwell & Wishaw Schools 50 Yards Girls’ Championship.

She represented the Scottish team at the 1950 British Empire Games in Auckland, New Zealand, where she won the bronze medal in the 3×110 yd medley relay with Elenor Gordon and Betty Turner.

Girvan competed for Great Britain in the 400 metre and 4 × 100 metres freestyle events at the 1956 Olympics and reached the final in the relay. She represented Scotland at the British Empire Games in 1950, 1954 and 1958 and won one gold and two bronze medals. She won the 1956 ASA National Championship 440 yards freestyle title.
