= Elizabeth Church =

British swimmer (born 1930)

Personal information
- Nationality: British (English)
- Born: 11 March 1930 (age 96) Marylebone, London, England

Sport
- Sport: Swimming
- Strokes: Breaststroke
- Club: Northampton
Medal record
Swimming
Representing England
British Empire Games
Bronze medal – third place	1950 Auckland	220y Breaststroke
Silver medal – second place	1950 Auckland	330y Medley Relay

Elizabeth Mabel Church (born 11 March 1930) is a female British former swimmer.

== Biography ==
She grew up at Harpole Grange, in Harpole in Northamptonshire, the daughter of Dudley R. Church, who owned the property from 1940. Her father married (Louise) Betty Skinner, at St Mary-le-Bow, on 1 June 1929. Her mother died on 18 October 1992. Her grandfather (Thomas) Dudley Church was one of three brothers (William and Alfred) who owned Church's shoes in Northampton.

Church competed in the women's 200 metre breaststroke at the 1948 Summer Olympics. At the ASA National British Championships she won the 220 yards breaststroke title in 1947 and 1948.

She represented the English team at the 1950 British Empire Games in Auckland, New Zealand, where she won the silver medal in the 330 yard Medley relay and a bronze medal in the 220 yard breaststroke.

== See also ==
- Jacqueline Enfield
