= Donald Bland =

British swimmer

Personal information
- Nationality: British (English)
- Born: 23 July 1931 Gateshead, England
- Died: 6 May 2006 (aged 74) Newcastle upon Tyne, England

Sport
- Sport: Swimming
- Strokes: freestyle
- Club: Lambton SC / Northsea
Medal record
Swimming
Representing England
British Empire Games
Bronze medal – third place	1950 Auckland	880y Freestyle Relay

Donald Bland (23 July 1931 – 6 May 2006) was a British swimmer who competed at the 1948 Summer Olympics.

== Biography ==
At the 1948 Olympic Games in London he competed in the men's 1500 metre freestyle.

He represented the English team at the 1950 British Empire Games in Auckland, New Zealand, where he won a bronze medal in the 4×220 yd freestyle relay.

Four years later he represented the English team at the 1954 British Empire and Commonwealth Games held in Vancouver, Canada, where he participated in the freestyle events.
