= Helen Yate =

British swimmer (1921–2020)

Personal information
- Nationality: British (English)
- Born: 1 January 1921 Plymouth, England
- Died: 11 August 2020 (aged 99) Plymouth, England

Sport
- Sport: Swimming
- Strokes: Backstroke
- Club: Mermaid Swimming Club
Medal record
Swimming
Representing England
British Empire Games
Silver medal – second place	1950 Auckland	330y Medley Relay
Bronze medal – third place	1950 Auckland	110y Backstroke
Bronze medal – third place	1950 Auckland	440y Freestyle Relay

Helen Marie Yate (1 January 1921 – 11 August 2020) was a British swimmer, who competed at the 1948 Summer Olympics.

== Biography ==
At the 1948 Olympic Games in London, she competed in the women's 100 metre backstroke event.

At the ASA National British Championships she won the 110 yards backstroke title in 1949.

She represented the English team at the 1950 British Empire Games in Auckland, New Zealand, where she won three medals in the 110 yard backstroke and relay events.
