= Alfred Newman (cyclist) =

British

Personal information
- Nationality: British (English)
- Born: 3 August 1926 Birmingham, England
- Died: 8 December 1990 (aged 64) Mansfield, England

Sport
- Sport: Cycling
- Club: Concorde CC, Coleshill

Alfred Dennis Newman (3 August 1926 – 8 December 1990) was a male cyclist who competed for England at the 1950 British Empire Games (now Commonwealth Games).

== Biography ==
Newman represented England in the road race at the 1950 British Empire Games in Auckland, New Zealand. During the Games in 1950 he lived at Picton Grove, Billesley, Warwickshire, and was a cycle warehouse clerk by trade.

He was the 1949 British Massed Start Champion and twice on the winning team in the National Hill-climb Championships.
