= Raymond Legg =

English swimmer

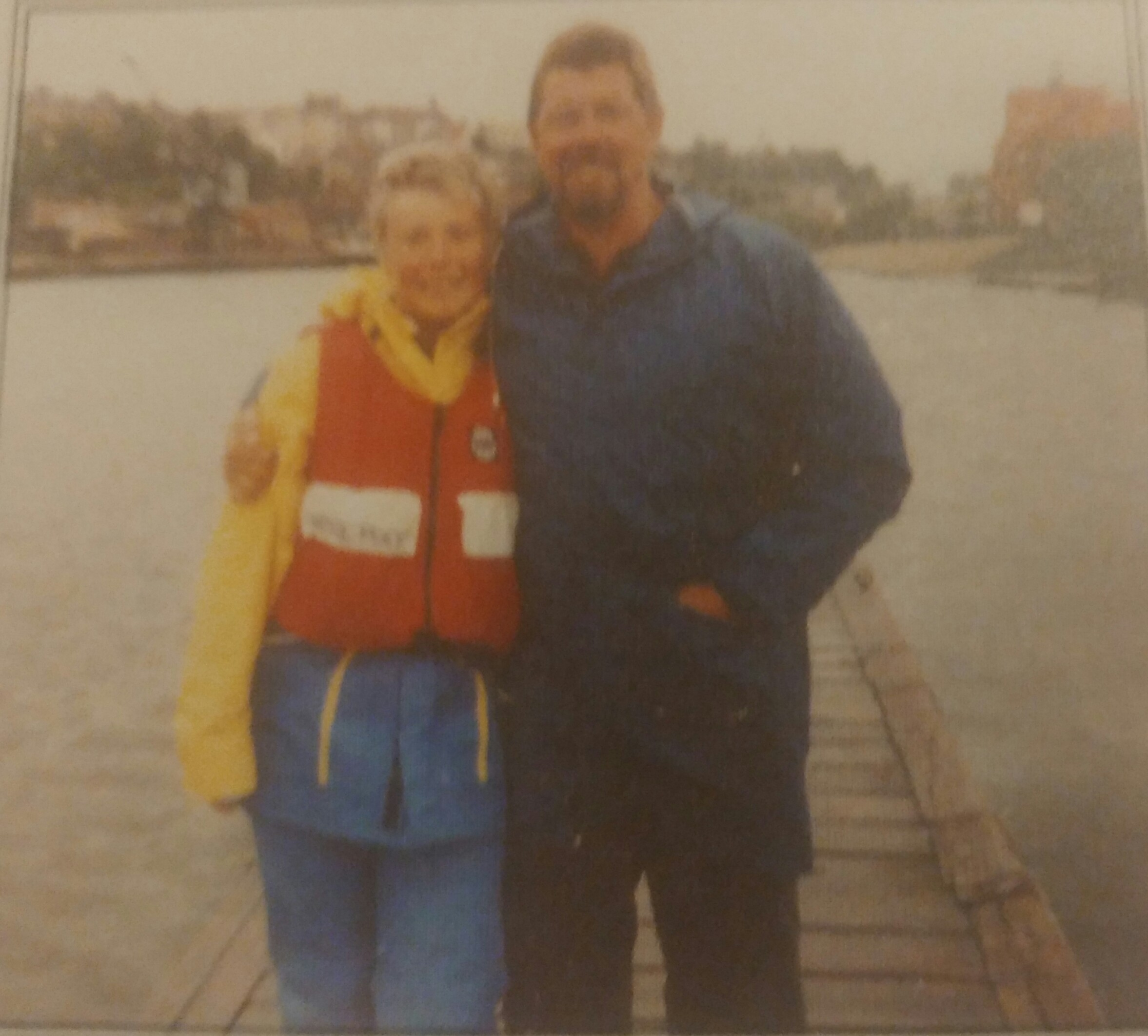
- Legg at Bristol Harbourside

Personal information
- Nationality: British (English)
- Born: First quarter 1932 Bristol, England
- Died: 2015

Sport
- Sport: Swimming
- Event: freestyle
- Club: Bristol Central SC
Medal record
Swimming
Representing England
British Empire Games
Bronze medal – third place	1950 Auckland	880y Freestyle Relay

Raymond Maurice Legg (1932 – 2015) was a male swimmer who competed at the British Empire Games (now Commonwealth Games).

== Biography ==
Legg was a member of Bristol Central Swimming Club and was national junior champion at the age of thirteen and went on to compete for England.

He represented the English team at the 1950 British Empire Games in Auckland, New Zealand, where he won the bronze medal in the 4×220 yd freestyle relay event. During the Games in 1950 he lived at Downton Road, Knowle, Bristol and was a clerk by trade.

Later that decade he joined the Avon and Somerset Constabulary River Police, policing the city docks and checking the cargo of ships. Whilst working part time for the Port of Bristol in Bristol Harbourside a windsurfing instructor, he taught students of both of Bristol's universities.

Legg competed in the Central water polo team, whilst joining the Policeman's choir, with whom he successfully recorded and performed for years in venues from Bristol's West End, to London's Royal Albert Hall.
