= Mayzod Reid =

New Zealand sportswoman

Mayzod Hodgson
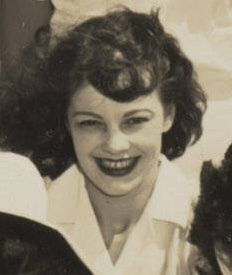
- Reid in 1950

Personal information
- Born: Mayzod Elizabeth Reid; 30 August 1928 Dunedin, New Zealand
- Died: 13 November 2001 (aged 73) Auckland, New Zealand
- Spouse: Clifford William Hodgson (m. 1951; died 1983)

Sport
- Country: New Zealand
- Sport: Diving

Achievements and titles
- National finals: Diving champion (1946, 1947, 1948)

Mayzod Elizabeth Hodgson (née Reid; 30 August 1928 − 13 November 2001) was a New Zealand diver who represented her country at the 1950 British Empire Games.

== Early life and family ==
Born Mayzod Elizabeth Reid, Hodgson was born in Dunedin on 30 August 1928, the daughter of Daisy Agnes Reid (née Scott) and Arthur Alexander Reid, a doctor. As an 18-year-old in 1946, she played in what is believed to have been the first women's rugby union tournament in New Zealand, held at Carisbrook.

== Swimming and diving ==
Reid twice won the New Zealand national intermediate girls' diving championship, and went on to win the New Zealand national women's diving championship in 1946, 1947, and 1948.

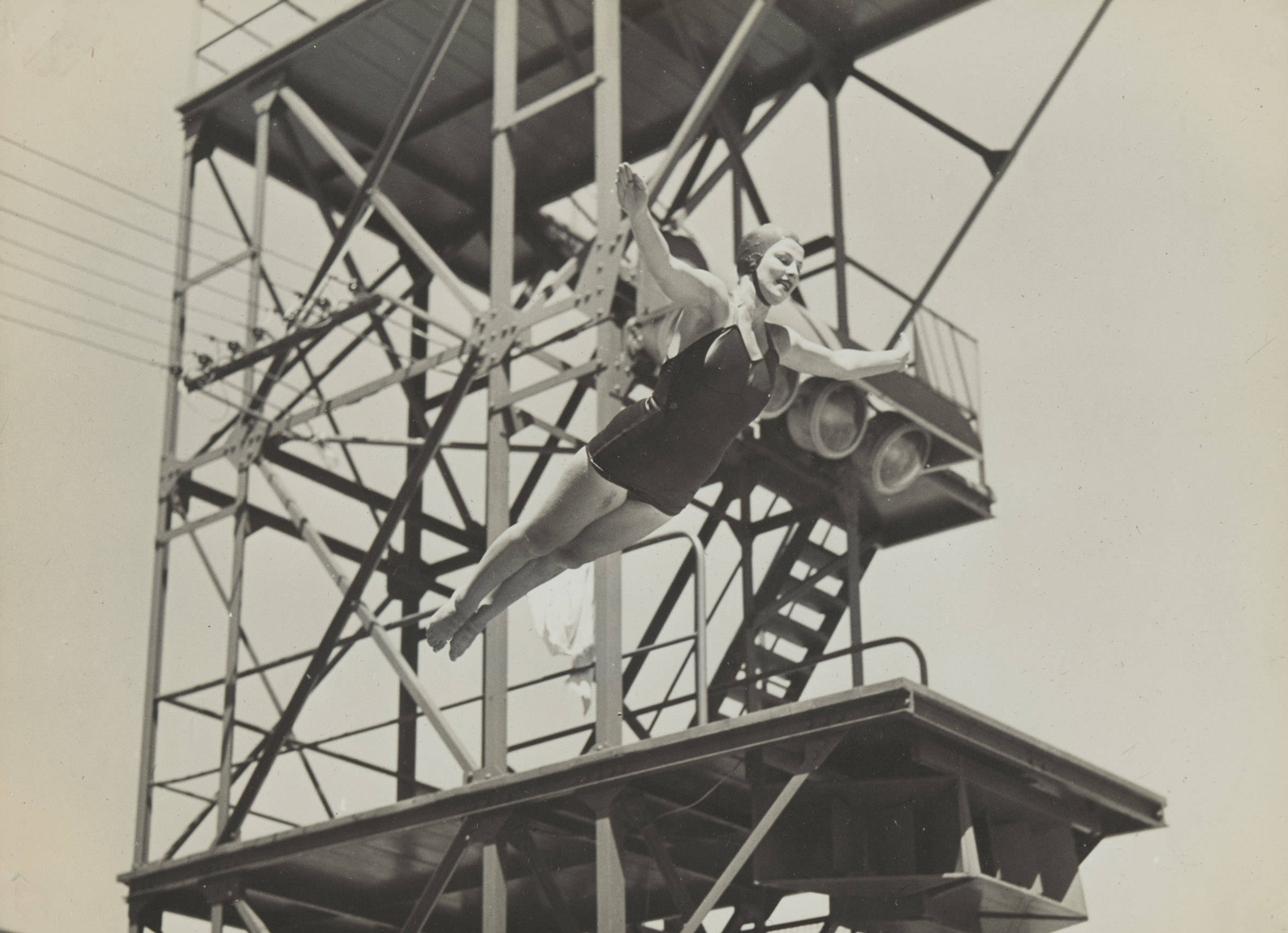
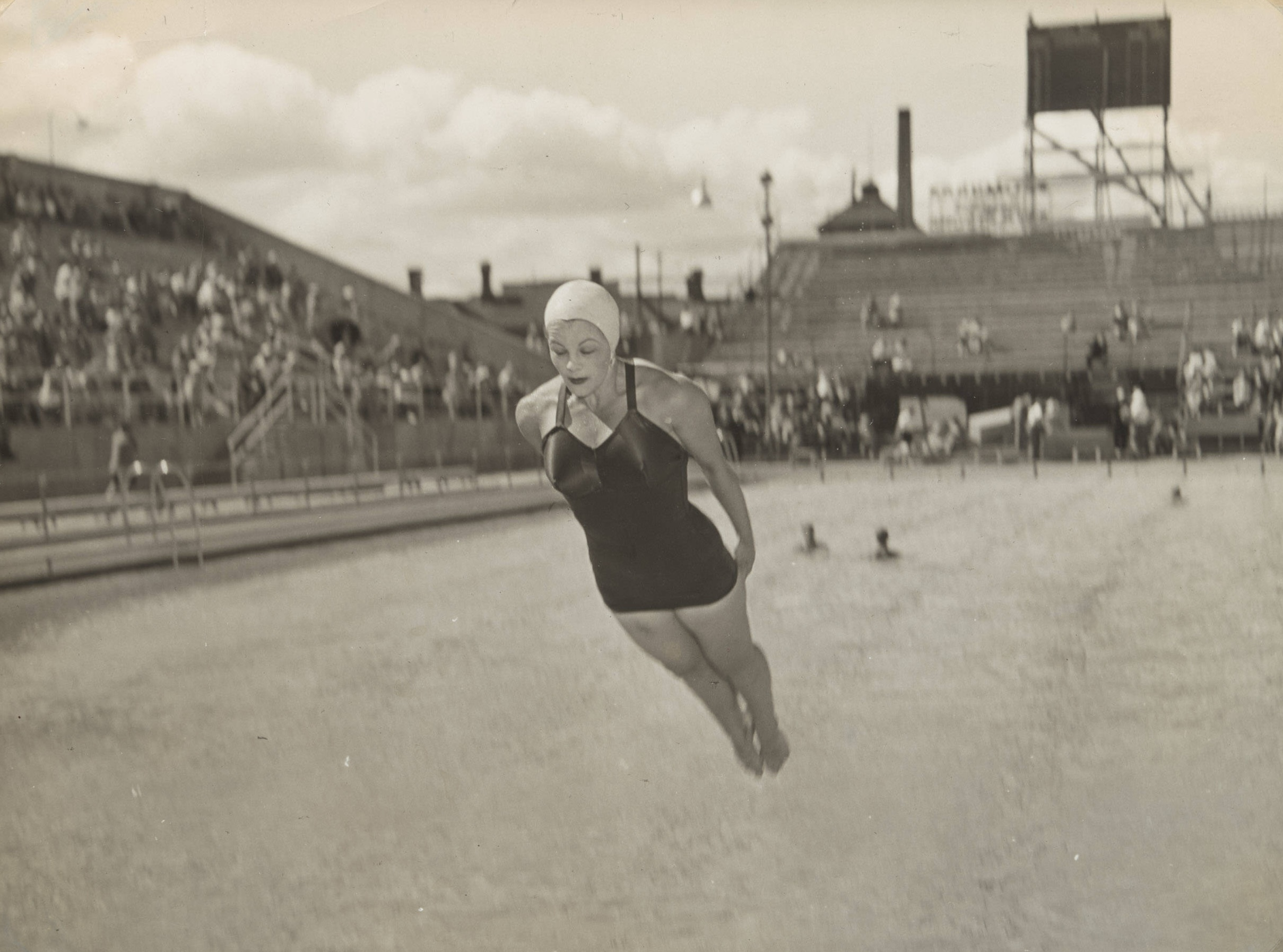
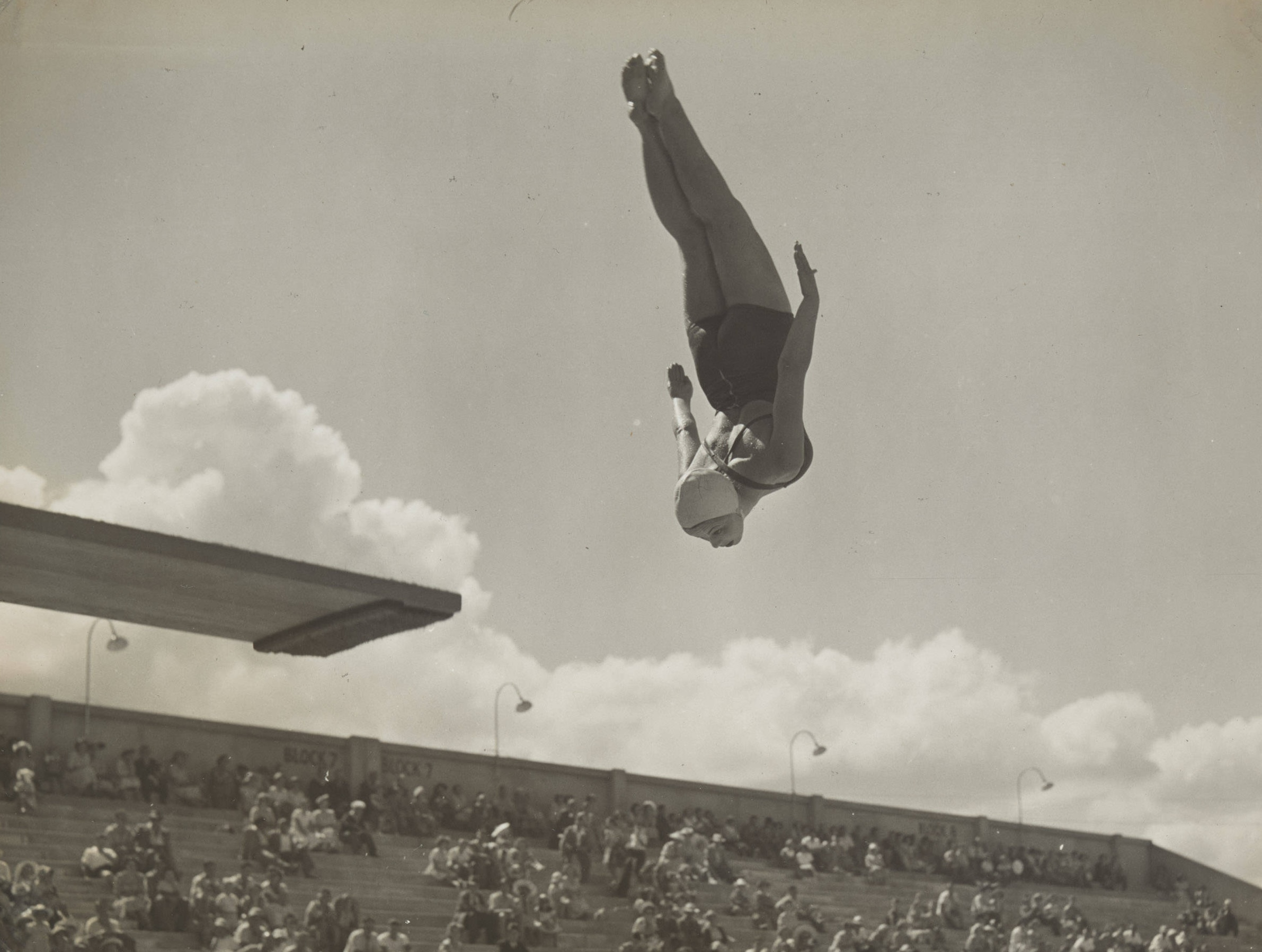
Reid competing at the 1950 British Empire Games

She then competed for New Zealand at the 1950 British Empire Games in Auckland where she finished sixth in the women's 3 m springboard.

== Later life ==
After Reid's marriage to Clifford William Hodgson, she lived in Auckland where she continued her interest in diving as a secondary school diving coach and judge. She also served as a diving delegate to the Auckland Swimming Centre.

Reid died on 13 November 2001 and was cremated, with her ashes interred at Purewa Cemetery in Auckland. She had been predeceased by her husband in 1983.
