= England at the 1950 British Empire Games =

- CG code: ENG
- CGA: Commonwealth Games England

in Auckland, New Zealand
- Medals Ranked 2nd: Gold 19 Silver 16 Bronze 13 Total 48

British Empire Games appearances
- 1930; 1934; 1938; 1950; 1954; 1958; 1962; 1966; 1970; 1974; 1978; 1982; 1986; 1990; 1994; 1998; 2002; 2006; 2010; 2014; 2018; 2022; 2026; 2030

England competed at the 1950 British Empire Games in Auckland, New Zealand, from 4 February to 11 February 1950.

England finished second in the medal table behind Australia with 19 gold medals, 16 silver medals and 13 bronze medals.

The team included competititors in event sports discipline with the exception of water polo.

== Medal table (top three) ==
Rank	Nation	Gold	Silver	Bronze	Total
1	Australia	34	27	19	80
2	England	19	16	13	48
3	New Zealand	10	22	21	53
Totals (3 entries)		63	65	53	181

== Team ==
=== Athletics ===
Men

Name	Club	Age	Occupation	Medal/s
Tim Anderson	Achilles Club	24	Medical student	Gold medal
Jack Archer	Notts AC	28	Physical Education teacher	Silver medal
Anthony Chivers	Reading AC	29		Bronze medal
Norman Drake	Blackpool	37	Teacher	none
Len Eyre	Harehills Harriers, Leeds	24	Civil servant	,
Don Finlay	Milocarian AC	40	Royal Air Force	none
Terry Higgins	Herne Hill Harriers	22	Clerk	Silver medal
Antony Hignell	Achilles Club	21		none
Jack Holden	Tipton Harriers	42		Gold medal
Leslie Lewis	Walton AC	25		,,
Harold Moody	South London Harriers	34	Doctor	Silver medal
John Parlett	Dorking St Pauls	24	Student	,
Ron Pavitt	Polytechnic Harriers	23	Clerk	none
Derek Pugh	South London Harriers	24		Silver medal
Nicolas Stacey	Oxford University	22		Silver medal
Brian Shenton	Doncaster AC	22	Transport Clerk	Silver medal
Peter Wells	London AC	20		none
Tom White	Lincoln Wellington AC	32		none
Harry Whittle	Reading AC	27		none

Women

Name	Club	Age	Occupation	Medal/s
Doris Batter	London Olympiades AC	20	Student	Silver medal
Sylvia Cheeseman	Spartan Ladies	20	Clerk	,
Bertha Crowther	Middlesex Ladies	28	Physical education teacher	Silver medal
Jean Desforges	Essex Ladies AC	22	Stenographer	none
Dorothy Hall	Essex Ladies AC	22	Typist	,
Dorothy Tyler	Mitcham AC	29	Housewife	Gold medal
Margaret Walker	Spartan Ladies	25	none	,

=== Boxing ===
Name	Club	Age	Occupation	Medal
Peter Brander	Slough Centre BC	22	Electrical engineer	Bronze medal
Ronnie Latham	Hickleton Main BC	20	Colliery blacksmith	Gold medal
Terry Ratcliffe	Bristol & R.A.F.	20	Royal Air Force	Gold medal
Don Scott	Premier BC, Derby	21	Electrical engineer	Gold medal

=== Cycling ===
Name	Club	Age	Occupation	Medal
Cyril Cartwright	Manchester Wheelers	26	Butcher	Gold medal
Alan Geldard	Manchester Wheelers	22	Signwriter	none
Tommy Godwin	Rover Cycling Club	29	Supervisor	Bronze medal
Eric Holroyd	Norwood Paragon CC	34	Motor mechanic	none
Alfred Newman	Concorde CC, Coleshill	23	Warehouse clerk	none

=== Diving ===
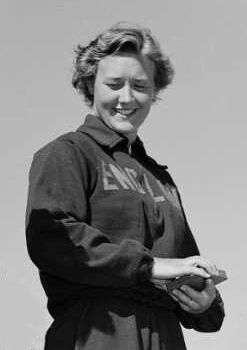
Edna Child at the 1950 Games

Name	Club	Age	Occupation	Medal
Edna Child	Plaistow United	27	Teacher	,

=== Fencing ===
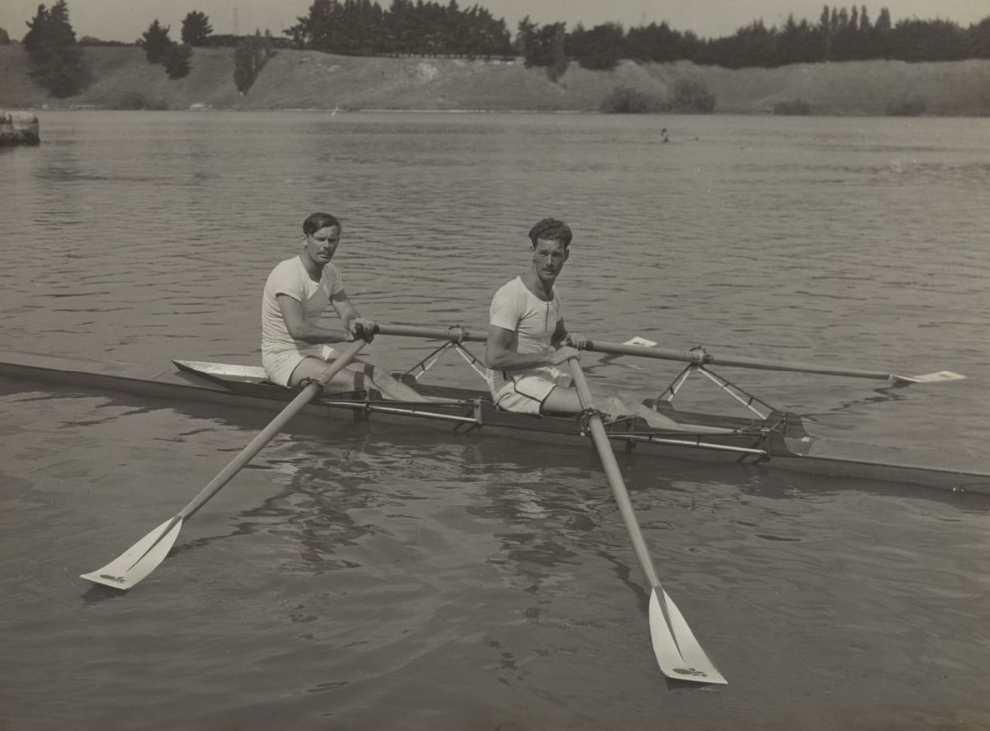
Tinegate (left) and Brown (right) Auckland Libraries Heritage

Name	Age	Occupation	Medal
Bob Anderson	27	Royal Marines	,,,,
Charles de Beaumont	47	Antiques dealer	,,
Mary Glen-Haig	31	Medical records officer	Gold medal
René Paul	29	Fencing club administrator	,,
Arthur Pilbrow	47	Restaurateur	,,

=== Rowing ===
Name	Club	Age	Occupation	Medal
Patrick Bradley	Leander Club			Bronze medal
Jack Brown	Loughborough RC	28	Company Director	Bronze medal
Dickie Burnell	Leander Club	32	Rowing journalist	Bronze medal
Tony Butcher	Thames Rowing Club	23		Bronze medal
Jack Dearlove	Thames Rowing Club	38	Planner	Bronze medal
Peter de Giles	Leander Club	22	Farm student	Bronze medal
Peter Kirkpatrick	Thames Rowing Club	33	ICI worker	Bronze medal
Michael Lapage	Leander Club	26	Teacher	Bronze medal
Antony Rowe	Leander Club	25	Rowing coach	Silver medal
Hank Rushmere	Thames Rowing Club	37	Insurance worker	Bronze medal
Ken Tinegate	Birmingham Rowing Club	34	Deputy Manager	Bronze medal
Bill Windham	Leander Club	23	Student	Bronze medal

=== Swimming ===
Men

Name	Club	Age	Occupation	Medal
Donald Bland	Lambton SC	18	Engineer/Fitter	Bronze medal
Jack Hale	Hull Kingston SC	27	Merchant	,
Pat Kendall	Sutton & Cheam	22	Student	,,
Raymond Legg	Bristol Central SC	17	Clerk	Bronze medal
Roy Romain	Otter SC, London	31		,

Women

Name	Club	Age	Occupation	Medal
Elizabeth Church	Northampton SC	19	Student	,
Lillian Parrington	Wallasey SC	21	Housewife	Bronze medal
Margaret Wellington	Beckenham Ladies SC	23	Clerk	,,,
Grace Wood	Bristol Central SC	17	Clerk	Bronze medal
Helen Yate	Mermaid SC	29	Clerk	,,

=== Weightlifting ===
Name	Club	Age	Occupation	Medal
Julian Creus	Liverpool	32		Silver medal
Jim Halliday	Bolton	32	Locomotive driver/coal worker	Gold medal
Maurice Megennis	Leeds	21	Electrician	none
Ernest Peppiatt	Highgate	32		none

=== Wrestling ===
Name	Club	Age	Occupation	Medal
Edwin Bowey	Ashdown AC, Islington	22	Horticulturist	none
David Ickringill	Keighley Airedale	19	Decorator	none
Arnold Parsons	Ashdown AC, Islington	23	Metal worker	Bronze medal
Kenneth Richmond	Foresters AWC, London	23	Actor	Bronze medal
