= Noel Chambers =

New Zealand swimmer (1923–1990)

Personal information
- Full name: Noel Reif Chambers
- Born: 14 July 1923
- Died: 22 November 1990 (aged 67)
- Relative: Colin Chambers (brother)

Sport
- Country: New Zealand
- Sport: Swimming
- Event: Freestyle

Achievements and titles
- National finals: 220 yards freestyle champion (1946, 1948); 440 yards freestyle champion (1946, 1948); 880 yards freestyle champion (1946)
Medal record
Men's swimming
Representing New Zealand
British Empire Games
Gold medal – first place	1950 Auckland	880 yards freestyle relay

Noel Reif Chambers (14 July 1923 – 22 November 1990) was a New Zealand swimmer who won a gold medal for his country at the 1950 British Empire Games.

Chambers won five New Zealand national swimming titles: the 220 yards freestyle in 1946 and 1948; the 440 yards freestyle in 1946 and 1948; and the 880 yards freestyle in 1946.

At the 1950 British Empire Games in Auckland, he won a gold medal as part of the New Zealand men's 4 x 220 yards freestyle relay team, alongside Lyall Barry, Buddy Lucas, and Michael Amos. He also competed in the 440 yards freestyle, finishing fourth in his heat with a time of 5:14.1, and did not progress to the final as the tenth fastest swimmer overall.

== See also ==
- List of Commonwealth Games medallists in swimming (men)
