= Nancy Lyons =

Australian swimmer (born 1930)

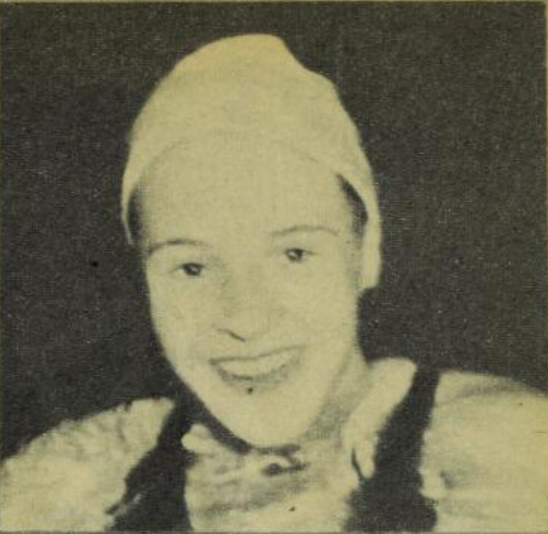
- Lyons in 1946

Personal information
- Full name: Beatrice Lyons
- Nickname: "Nancy"
- National team: Australia
- Born: 12 April 1930 (age 96)

Sport
- Sport: Swimming
- Strokes: Breaststroke
Medal record
Women's swimming
Representing Australia
Olympic Games
Silver medal – second place	1948 London	200 m breaststroke
British Empire Games
Gold medal – first place	1950 Auckland	3×110 yd medley
Silver medal – second place	1950 Auckland	220 yd breaststroke

Beatrice "Nancy" Lyons (born 12 April 1930), also known by her married name Beatrice Welch, is an Australian former breaststroke swimmer of the 1940s and 1950s who won a silver medal in the 200m breaststroke at the 1948 Summer Olympics.

== Swimming career ==
Coached in Brisbane by Mabel Springfield, the chaperone for female athletes on the Australian 1928 Summer Olympics team, Lyons nearly missed the London games. Although she was one of 25 swimmers chosen for the team, due to post-war financial difficulties, she was forced to raise the money herself to pay her fare to the Olympics. This was achieved and she finished half a second behind the world record-holder Petronella van Vliet of the Netherlands. This was two months after changing from the traditional breaststroke technique to the butterfly stroke, which was at that stage permitted due to a loophole in the rules.

Lyons returned to Australia and commenced studying a Bachelor of Arts degree at the University of Queensland, whilst continuing to train for the 1950 British Empire Games in Auckland. Lyons was beaten into second place by Scottish swimmer Helen Gordon in the 220-yard breaststroke, and won gold in the 3×110-yard medley relay with Judy-Joy Davies and Marjorie McQuade (as only three different strokes were in existence at the time). At the 1952 Summer Olympics in Helsinki, Lyons finished last in her semi-final with a time more than six seconds outside her best, set in the London final four years earlier. She retired after the games.

== See also ==
- List of Olympic medalists in swimming (women)
