= Roy Romain =

British swimmer

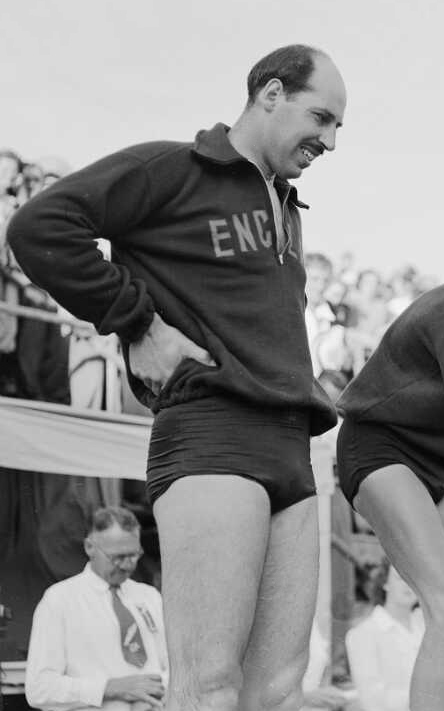
- Romain at the 1950 British Empire Games

Personal information
- Nationality: British (English)
- Born: 27 July 1918
- Died: 19 December 2010 (aged 92) Ashford, Surrey, England
- Height: 198 cm (6 ft 6 in)

Sport
- Sport: Swimming
- Event: Breaststroke
- Club: Otter Swimming Club, London
Medal record
Representing Great Britain
European Championships
Gold medal – first place	1947 Monte Carlo	200 m breaststroke
Representing England
British Empire Games
Gold medal – first place	1950 Auckland	3×110 yd medley
Silver medal – second place	1950 Auckland	220 yd breaststroke

Royston Isaac Romain (27 July 1918 – 19 December 2010) was a British swimmer who competed in the Olympic Games in 1948 in London.

== Biography ==
Romain was educated at Forest School, Walthamstow. He began swimming at the age of nine or ten and was a member of the Otter Swimming Club in London.

He competed in the 1948 Summer Olympics in men's 200 metres breaststroke, but did not win a medal, despite having gone into the competition with the year's fastest time.

At the ASA National British Championships he won the 220 yards breaststroke title in 1947, 1948 and 1949. He also represented England at the 1950 British Empire Games in Auckland, New Zealand, and won a gold medal in the 330 yard medley relay and a silver medal in the 220 yard breaststroke.

He continued into his 90s, winning the world Masters Swimming competitions in his 70s and 80s.

== See also ==
- List of Commonwealth Games medallists in swimming (men)
