= Jackie Wiid =

South African swimmer (1929–1992)

Personal information
- Full name: Jacobus Coenradus de Beer Wiid
- Born: 19 April 1929
- Died: 28 April 1992 (aged 63) Kroonstad, South Africa

Sport
- Sport: Swimming
- Strokes: Backstroke
Medal record
Men's swimming
Representing South Africa
British Empire Games
Gold medal – first place	1950 Auckland	110 yd backstroke

Jackie Wiid (19 April 1929 – 28 February 1992) was a South African swimmer who competed in the 1948 Summer Olympics.

== See also ==
- List of Commonwealth Games medallists in swimming (men)
