= Jack Stewart (diver) =

New Zealand diver

Sport
- Sport: Diving
Medal record
Representing New Zealand
British Empire Games
Bronze medal – third place	1950 Auckland	1 m Springboard
Bronze medal – third place	1954 Vancouver	1 m Springboard

Jack Stewart is a former diving representative from New Zealand.

At the 1950 British Empire Games he won the bronze medal in the men's 1 m springboard event. Four years later at the 1954 British Empire and Commonwealth Games he won another bronze medal again in the men's 1 m springboard.
