= Allen Gilchrist =

Canadian swimmer (born 1931)

Personal information
- Born: 23 November 1931 (age 94) Ocean Falls, British Columbia, Canada

Sport
- Sport: Swimming
Medal record
Men's swimming
Representing Canada
British Empire and Commonwealth Games
Silver medal – second place	1950 Auckland	3×110 yd medley
Silver medal – second place	1954 Vancouver	4×220 yd freestyle
Pan American Games
Bronze medal – third place	1955 Mexico City	4×200 m freestyle

Allen Thomas Gilchrist (born 23 November 1931) is a Canadian former freestyle swimmer. He competed at the 1948 Summer Olympics and the 1952 Summer Olympics. He is the older brother of Sandy Gilchrist.
