= Betty Moore (diver) =

New Zealand diver

Betty Main
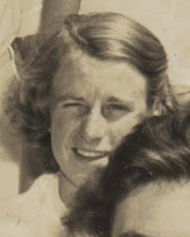
- Moore in 1950

Personal information
- Born: Clarice Lora Betty Moore; January 1929 (age 97)
- Occupation: Anaesthetist
- Spouse: Brian William Main (died 2009)

Sport
- Country: New Zealand
- Sport: Diving

Achievements and titles
- National finals: Diving champion (1949); Tower diving champion (1952, 1953)

Clarice Lora Betty Main (née Moore; born January 1929) is a former New Zealand diver, who represented her country at the 1950 British Empire Games.

== Early life and education ==
Born in January 1929, Main was educated at St Hilda's Collegiate School in Dunedin where she was the senior swimming and diving champion in 1945 and 1946. She was also active in surf lifesaving. She went on to study medicine at the University of Otago, graduating MB ChB in 1955.

== Swimming and diving ==
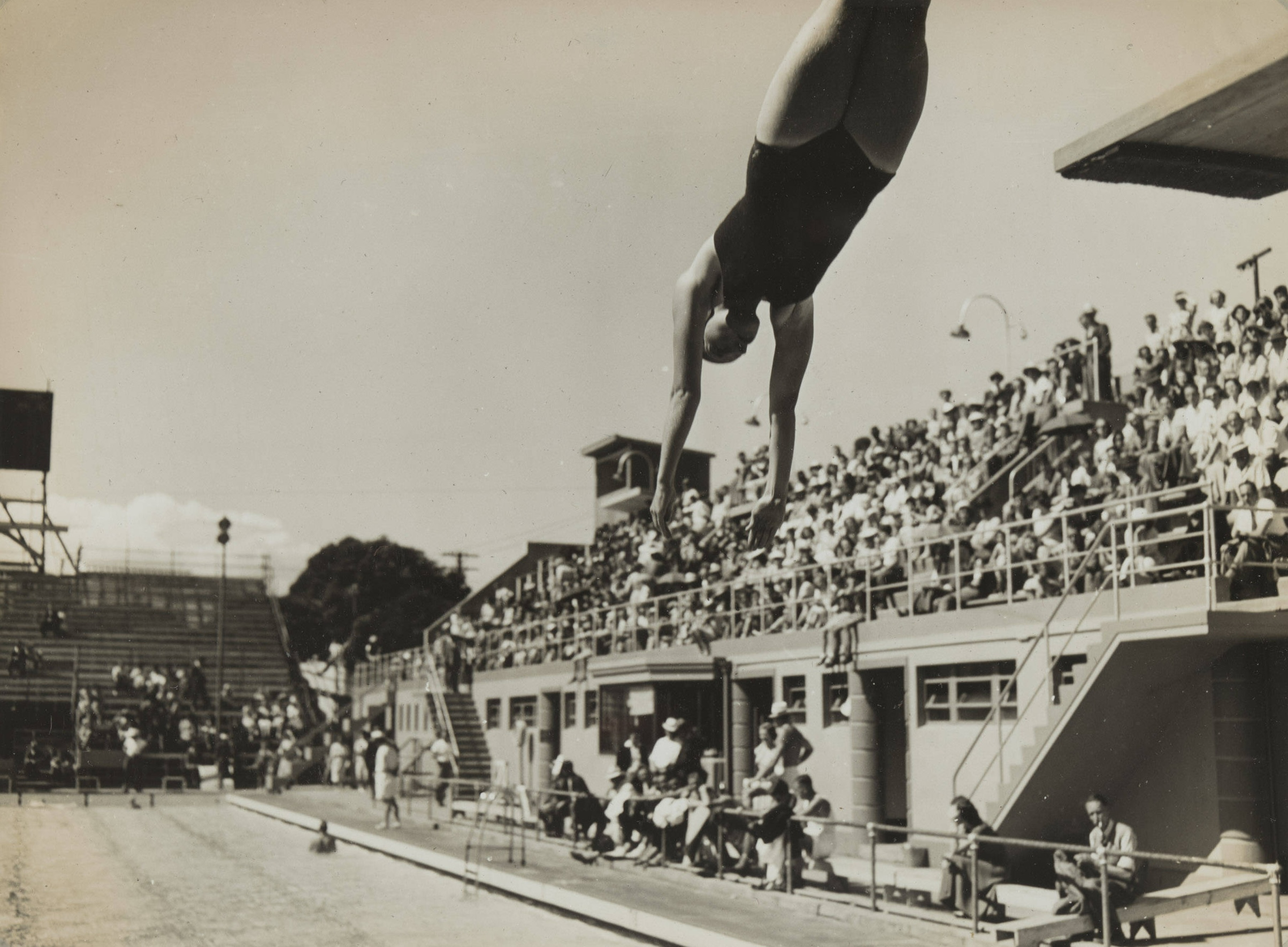
Moore competing at the 1950 British Empire Games

Moore began swimming with the Dunedin Swimming Club as a junior in the 1930s. In 1943, she won the South Island junior girls' diving title, and in 1945 she was runner-up in the national intermediate girls' diving championship. Moore won the New Zealand national women's diving championship in 1949, and then competed for New Zealand at the 1950 British Empire Games in Auckland. She finished eighth in the women's 3 m springboard. Subsequently, Moore won the New Zealand women's tower diving championship in 1952 and 1953.

== Later life ==
Moore was married to Brian William Main; he died in 2009. Betty Main worked as an anaesthetist at Dunedin Hospital, and lives in retirement in Wānaka. Main was still skiing regularly in 2019, at the age of 82, despite a knee replacement.
