= Francis Murphy (diver) =

Australian diver

Frank Murphy
Personal information
- Full name: Francis Thomas Murphy
- Nationality: Australian
- Born: 22 April 1928
- Died: 22 November 2012 (aged 84) Tweed Heads, New South Wales

Sport
- Sport: Diving
Medal record
Representing Australia
British Empire Games
Bronze medal – third place	1950 Auckland	10m platform

Francis Joseph Murphy (22 April 1928 – 22 November 2012), known as Frank Murphy, was an Australian diver. He competed at the 1952 Summer Olympics and the 1956 Summer Olympics.
