= Peter Bennett (footballer, born 1926) =

Australian rules footballer and water polo player

Personal information
- Full name: Peter John Bennett
- Born: 11 July 1926; Brighton, Victoria
- Died: 4 July 2012 (aged 85); Gold Coast, Queensland
- Original teams: Melbourne HSOB; Collegians
- Height: 183 cm (6 ft 0 in)
- Weight: 78 kg (172 lb)

Playing career^{1}
Years	Club	Games (Goals)
1944, 1947–54	St Kilda	103 (258)
- ^{1} Playing statistics correct to the end of 1954.

Career highlights
- Victorian state representative 4 times

Peter Bennett
Medal record

Men's water polo

Representing Australia

British Empire Games
Gold medal – first place	1950 Auckland	Water polo

Peter John Bennett (11 July 1926 – 4 July 2012) was an Olympian water polo player and Australian rules footballer who played with St Kilda in the Victorian Football League (VFL). Bennett was a full forward and topped St Kilda's goal kicking five times, with a best of 59 goals in 1950; however, he never fully recovered from a knee injury sustained in his debut match in 1944 and was among the best players in a poor team.

Having already declined an invitation to represent the Australian team in water polo at the 1948 Summer Olympics and claimed a gold medal in the sport at the 1950 British Empire Games in Auckland, in 1952 Bennett took a year off from football in order to take part in the 1952 Summer Olympics at Helsinki. After two more seasons at St Kilda he decided to retire from football to concentrate on water polo, and captained the Australian team at the 1956 Melbourne Olympics where they finished ninth. In 2012, he was inducted into the Water Polo Australia Hall of Fame.

He was educated at Wesley College and Melbourne High School. He served as a private in the Australian Army as a teenager during the Second World War. His wife Marjorie McQuade was an Olympic swimmer for Australia in the 1948 and 1952 games, and a triple gold medallist at the 1950 Empire Games.
