= Malcolm Hastie =

Australian water polo player

Personal information
- Full name: Malcolm Thomas Hastie
- Nationality: Australian
- Born: 19 February 1929
- Died: 8 April 2017 (aged 88) Malvern, Victoria

Sport
- Sport: Water polo

Malcolm Thomas Hastie (19 February 1929 – 8 April 2017) was an Australian water polo player. He competed in the men's tournament at the 1952 Summer Olympics. He also won the gold medal with the Australian team in the exhibition event at the 1950 British Empire Games.
