= Pat Kendall =

English competitive swimmer

Personal information
- Nickname: "Pat"
- Nationality: British (English)
- Born: 8 March 1927 Rochford, England
- Died: 18 July 1968 (aged 41)

Sport
- Sport: Swimming
- Strokes: Freestyle
- Club: Sutton & Cheam
Medal record
Men's swimming
Representing England
British Empire Games
Gold medal – first place	1950 Auckland	3×110 yd medley
Bronze medal – third place	1950 Auckland	110 yd freestyle
Bronze medal – third place	1950 Auckland	4×220 yd freestyle

Patrick Hume Kendall (8 March 1927 – 18 July 1968) was an English competitive swimmer.

== Biography ==
Kendall represented Great Britain at the 1948 Summer Olympics in London. Kendall competed in the round one preliminary heats of the men's 100-metre freestyle event, but he did not advance.

He represented the English team at the 1950 British Empire Games in Auckland, New Zealand. He won a gold medal in the 3×110-yard medley relay as a member of the winning English team.

He also won the 1947 and 1950 ASA National Championship 100 metres freestyle title.

== See also ==
- List of Commonwealth Games medallists in swimming (men)
