= Peter Salmon (swimmer) =

Canadian swimmer (1929–2003)

Personal information
- Full name: Peter Alexander Salmon
- National team: Canada
- Born: August 5, 1929 Victoria, British Columbia, Canada
- Died: October 11, 2003 (aged 74) Eugene, Oregon, U.S.

Sport
- Sport: Swimming
- Strokes: Freestyle, backstroke, breaststroke
Medal record
Men's swimming
Representing Canada
British Empire Games
Gold medal – first place	1950 Auckland	110 yd freestyle
Silver medal – second place	1950 Auckland	3×110 yd medley
Representing Washington
NCAA
Gold medal – first place	1951 Austin	150 yard individual medley

Peter A. Salmon (August 3, 1929 – October 11, 2003) was a competitive backstroke, breaststroke and freestyle swimmer from Canada. He represented Canada at two consecutive Summer Olympics, starting in 1948 in London. Salmon claimed the gold medal in the men's 100-metre freestyle event at the 1950 British Empire Games in Auckland, New Zealand.

== See also ==
- List of Commonwealth Games medallists in swimming (men)
