= Frank O'Neill (swimmer) =

Australian swimmer (1926–2024)

Personal information
- Born: 30 September 1926 Manly, New South Wales, Australia
- Died: 10 July 2024 (aged 97) Manly, New South Wales, Australia

Sport
- Sport: Swimming
- Strokes: Backstroke, freestyle
Medal record
Men's swimming
Representing Australia
British Empire Games
Silver medal – second place	1950 Auckland	110 yd freestyle
Silver medal – second place	1950 Auckland	4×220 yd freestyle

Francis Thomas O'Neill (30 September 1926 – 10 July 2024) was an Australian swimmer. He competed in three events at the 1952 Summer Olympics and at the 1950 British Empire Games. O'Neill was the first Australian to swim 110 yards in under one minute. While living in the French Riviera, he was credited with teaching actresses Ginger Rogers and Greta Garbo to swim, as well as teaching diving to author W. Somerset Maugham. O'Neill died in Manly, New South Wales on 10 July 2024, at the age of 97.
