= Lucien Beaumont =

Canadian swimmer (born 1931)

Personal information
- Born: 5 February 1931 (age 95)

Sport
- Sport: Swimming
- College team: Ohio State University
Medal record
Men's swimming
Representing Canada
British Empire Games
Silver medal – second place	1950 Auckland	3×110 yd medley

Lucien Beaumont (born 5 February 1931) is a Canadian former swimmer. He competed in three events at the 1952 Summer Olympics.
