= Denise Norton =

Australian swimmer

Personal information
- Born: 7 August 1933 (age 93)

Sport
- Sport: Swimming
Medal record
Representing Australia
British Empire and Commonwealth Games
Gold medal – first place	1950 Auckland	4×110yd freestyle relay
Bronze medal – third place	1950 Auckland	440yd freestyle

Denise Norton (born 7 August 1930) was the first South Australian to represent Australia at an Olympic or Commonwealth Games.

Norton won gold as part of the 4 × 110 yard Freestyle relay and bronze in the 440 yard Freestyle for the 1950 British Empire Games and was subsequently selected in the Australian Olympic team for Helsinki in 1952, where she competed in the 100 and 400 metre freestyle events.

She was the first inductee into SwimmingSA's Hall of Fame. During her career she broke numerous Australian records.

Park 2 in the Adelaide Park Lands has been named after her.
