= Ronald Faulds =

Australian diver

Ron Faulds
Personal information
- Full name: Ronald Sinclair Faulds
- Nationality: Australian
- Born: 2 August 1922 Moonee Ponds, Victoria, Australia
- Died: 8 March 2006 (aged 83)

Sport
- Sport: Diving

Ronald Sinclair Faulds (2 August 1922 – 8 March 2006), known as Ron Faulds, was an Australian diver. He competed at the 1952 Summer Olympics and the 1956 Summer Olympics.
