= Joseph McCann (diver) =

Australian diver

Personal information
- Full name: Joseph Andrew Vincent McCann
- Nationality: Australian
- Born: 23 September 1925 Wentworthville, New South Wales, Australia
- Died: 7 September 1989 (aged 63)

Sport
- Sport: Diving

Joseph Andrew Vincent McCann (23 September 1925 – 7 September 1989) was an Australian diver. He competed in the men's 3 metre springboard event at the 1956 Summer Olympics.
