= Beatrice Kerr =

Australian swimmer

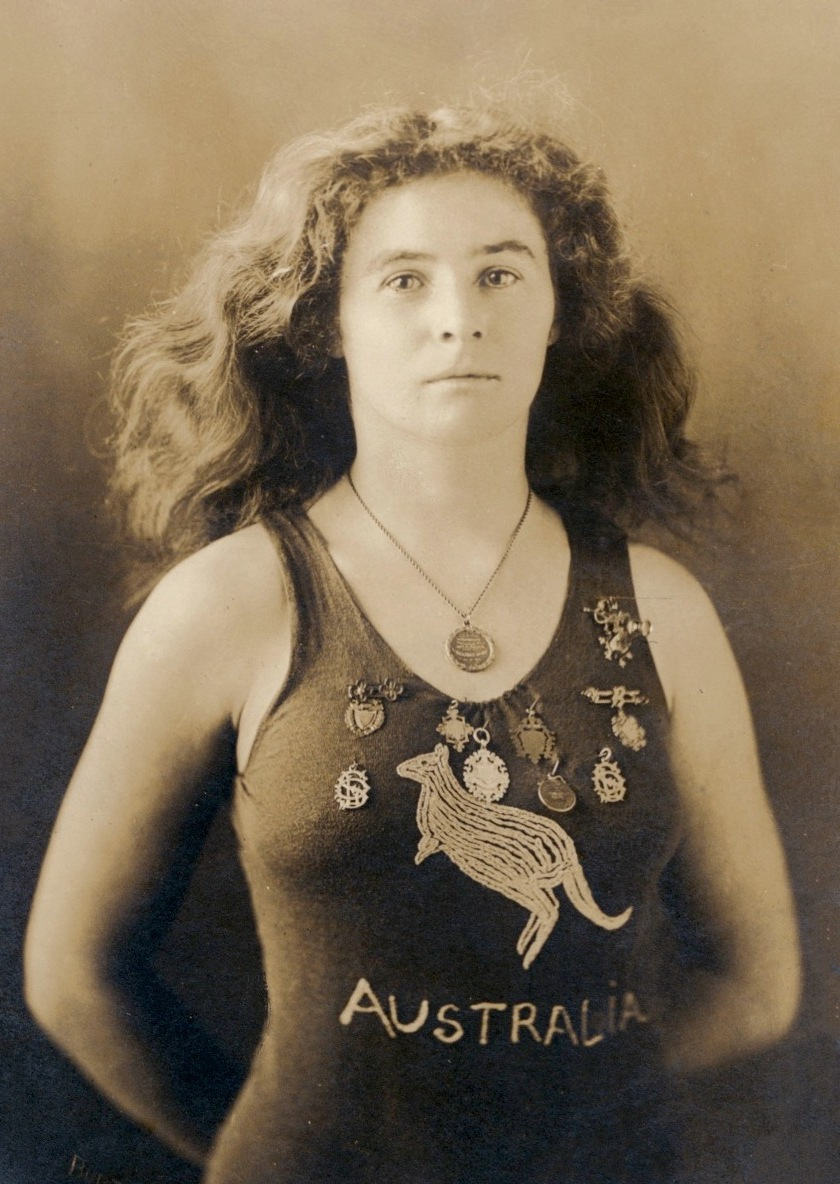
- Born: Beatrice Maude Kerr; 30 November 1887; Williamstown, Victoria
- Died: 3 August 1971 (aged 83); Coogee, New South Wales
- Resting place: Waverley Cemetery
- Other names: Beatrice Williams (married name)
- Occupation: Aquatic performer

Beatrice Maude Williams (née Kerr; 30 November 1887 – 3 August 1971), known professionally as Beatrice Kerr, was an Australian swimmer, diver, and aquatic performer. Born in Melbourne, Kerr learnt to swim at Albert Park Lake, and won medals at both the Victorian and Australasian championships in 1905, at the age of 17. Early the following year, she toured South Australia and Western Australia, winning every race she entered. From there, Kerr went to England, giving swimming exhibitions in Bradford, Liverpool, London, and Manchester, being billed as "Australia's Champion Lady Swimmer and Diver". She returned to Australia in October 1911, living the rest of her life in Sydney, New South Wales. Although often compared to Annette Kellerman, another Australian swimmer, Kerr's repeated challenges to Kellerman to race went unanswered.

== Early life ==
Kerr was born on 30 November 1887 to Alexander Robert Kerr and his wife, Eliza Sophie (née Clark), in Williamstown, a suburb of Melbourne, Victoria. The eldest of five children, she was raised at Albert Park, and was taught to swim by her mother at the nearby Albert Park Lake. Kerr swam competitively from an early age.

== Career ==
In 1905 Kerr won medals at both the Victorian and Australasian Championships. During this time, she also gave a number of swimming and diving exhibitions, reputedly performing 366 times in a period of 20 weeks. In early 1906, Kerr went on a six-week tour of South Australia and Western Australia, performing in Adelaide, Coolgardie, Kalgoorlie, and Perth. Managed by her brother-in-law, she entered 43 races at which she won 43 prizes during the tour, and also won five open championships.

From Perth, Kerr journeyed to England aboard the Commonwealth. At a stopover in Durban, Natal, she gave a performance billed as "Australia's Champion Lady Swimmer and Diver", which she would use for the remainder of the tour. In England, Kerr gave examples of swimming strokes which included breaststroke and the trudgeon, and gave displays of "somersaults, high diving, blindfold backjumps, [and] kneeling dives". During a performance in Blackpool in August 1911, Kerr rescued two young boys swept out from the jetty at the North Pier by a strong current. Kerr's best time in the 100 yards was 1 minute, 21.4 seconds, and in the mile, 27.5 minutes. She returned to Australia in October 1911, and continued touring for a period of time before marrying Griffith Ellis Williams in Redfern, Sydney, on 3 April 1912.

== Death ==
The couple lived in Bondi, with Kerr dying on 3 August 1971 aged 83. She was buried at Waverley Cemetery, survived by her only son.
