= Mabel Springfield =

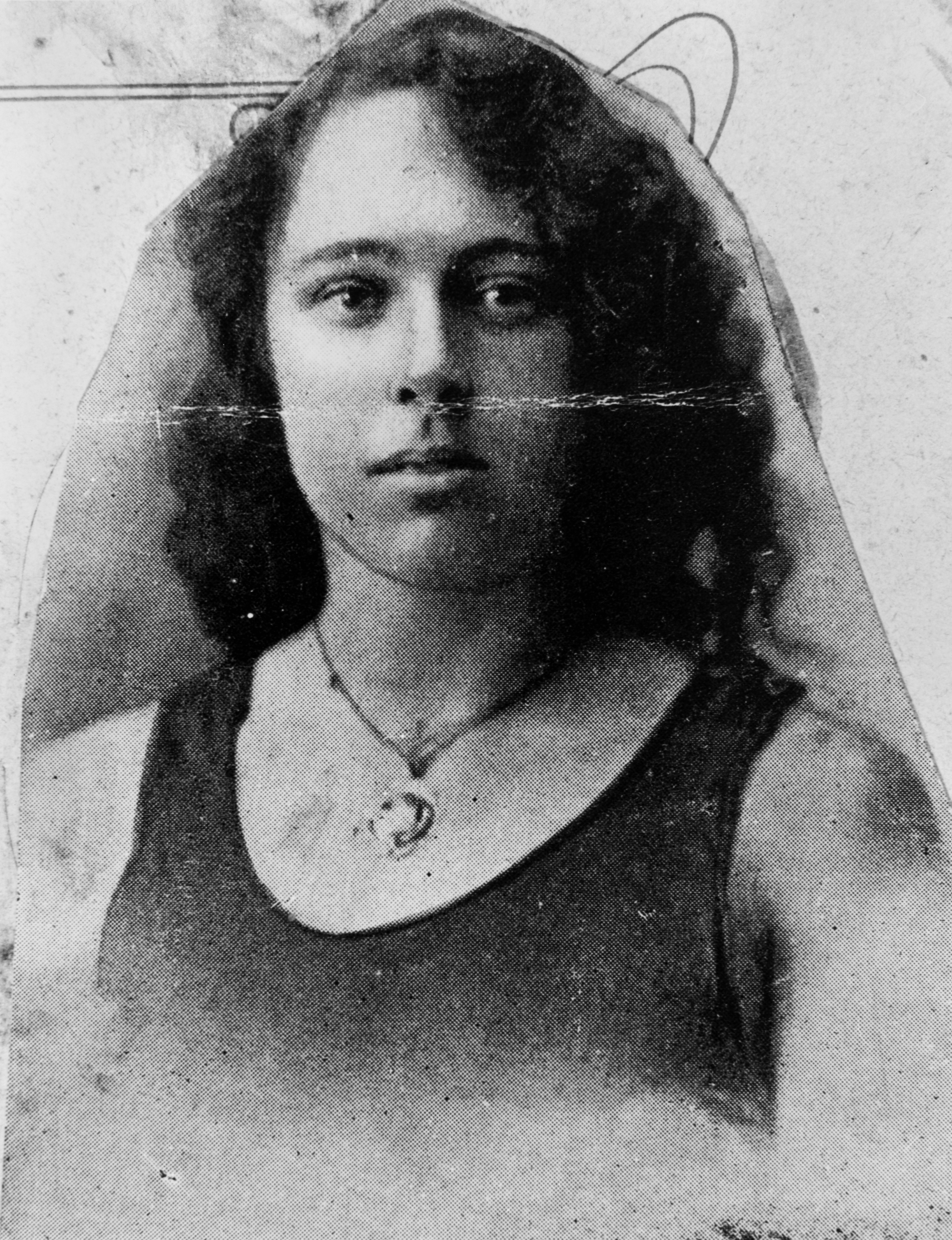
- Springfield (undated)

Personal information
- Birth name: Mabel Angelina Springfield
- Born: 10 March 1892; Mooloolah, Queensland, Australia
- Died: 26 November 1966 (aged 74); Brisbane, Queensland, Australia
- Occupation(s): Swimmer and swim coach

Sport
- Sport: Swimming

Mabel Angelina Springfield (10 March 1892 – 26 November 1966) was an Australian swimmer and swimming coach. She is known as the coach of dual Olympian, Nancy Lyons.

Mabel Springfield was born on 10 March 1892 at Mooloolah in Queensland and educated at the local state school. Her parents were Angelina Bianca Clementina (née Koch) and carpenter and railway worker, Frank Springfield. Her brother, Frank, competed in the 1908 Olympic Games.

Springfield was a member of the Valley Ladies' Swimming Club in Brisbane, becoming club champion in 1905. At age 14 she was commended for rescuing a 10-year-old girl, who had got into difficulties in deep water and was unable to swim.

Springfield qualified to swim at both the 1920 and 1924 Summer Olympics but lack of funding prevented her from travelling to the competitions. She was appointed chaperone to the women's swim team for the 1928 Summer Olympics, but had to pay her own way to do so.

Among the members of her swimming squads was Nancy Lyons, a dual Olympian.

Springfield was injured in a car accident and died at Royal Brisbane Hospital on 26 November 1966.
