= Denise Spencer =

Australian swimmer

Personal information
- Full name: Denise Dowling Henderson
- Nationality: Australian
- Born: Denise Dowling Spencer; 9 September 1929 Roma, Queensland, Australia
- Died: 6 September 1998 (aged 68) Tugun, Queensland, Australia

Sport
- Sport: Swimming
- Strokes: Freestyle
Medal record
Representing Australia
British Empire and Commonwealth Games
Gold medal – first place	1950 Auckland	4×110yd freestyle relay

Denise Dowling Henderson (née Spencer; 9 September 1929 – 6 September 1998) was an Australian freestyle swimmer. She competed in two events at the 1948 Summer Olympics.

Henderson was born in the Queensland town of Roma in 1929, and until the 2016 Summer Olympics in Rio de Janeiro was the only Olympic athlete from the town. In 1948, Roma Town Council named a street Spencer Street in her honour, being the location of the swimming baths where she learned to swim. In September 1950, she married stock manager and auctioneer George Henderson.

Henderson died on 6 September 1998 at John Flynn Hospital in Tugun on the Gold Coast.
