= Colin Chambers =

New Zealand swimmer (1926–2005)

Personal information
- Full name: Colin John Chambers
- Born: 14 July 1923 Christchurch, New Zealand
- Died: 7 December 2005 (aged 78) Christchurch, New Zealand
- Relative: Noel Chambers (brother)

Sport
- Country: New Zealand
- Sport: Swimming
- Event: Freestyle

Achievements and titles
- National finals: 440 yards freestyle champion (1947); 880 yards freestyle champion (1947, 1948, 1949); 1 mile freestyle champion (1946, 1947, 1948, 1949)

Colin John Chambers (25 December 1926 – 7 December 2005) was a New Zealand swimmer who represented his country at the 1950 British Empire Games.

Chambers won eight New Zealand national swimming titles: the 440 yards freestyle in 1947; the 880 yards freestyle in 1947, 1948, and 1949; and the one mile freestyle in 1946, 1947, 1948, and 1949.

At the 1950 British Empire Games, he competed in the 1650 yards freestyle. He finished second in his heat, in a time of 21:46.6, and was the sixth-fastest qualifier for the final. In the final, he swam the distance in 21:43.3 to finish in sixth place. His brother, Noel, won a gold medal at the same games in the 4 x 220 yards freestyle relay.

Colin Chambers died in Christchurch on 7 December 2005.
