= Newmarket Olympic Pool =

Sports venue in Auckland, New Zealand

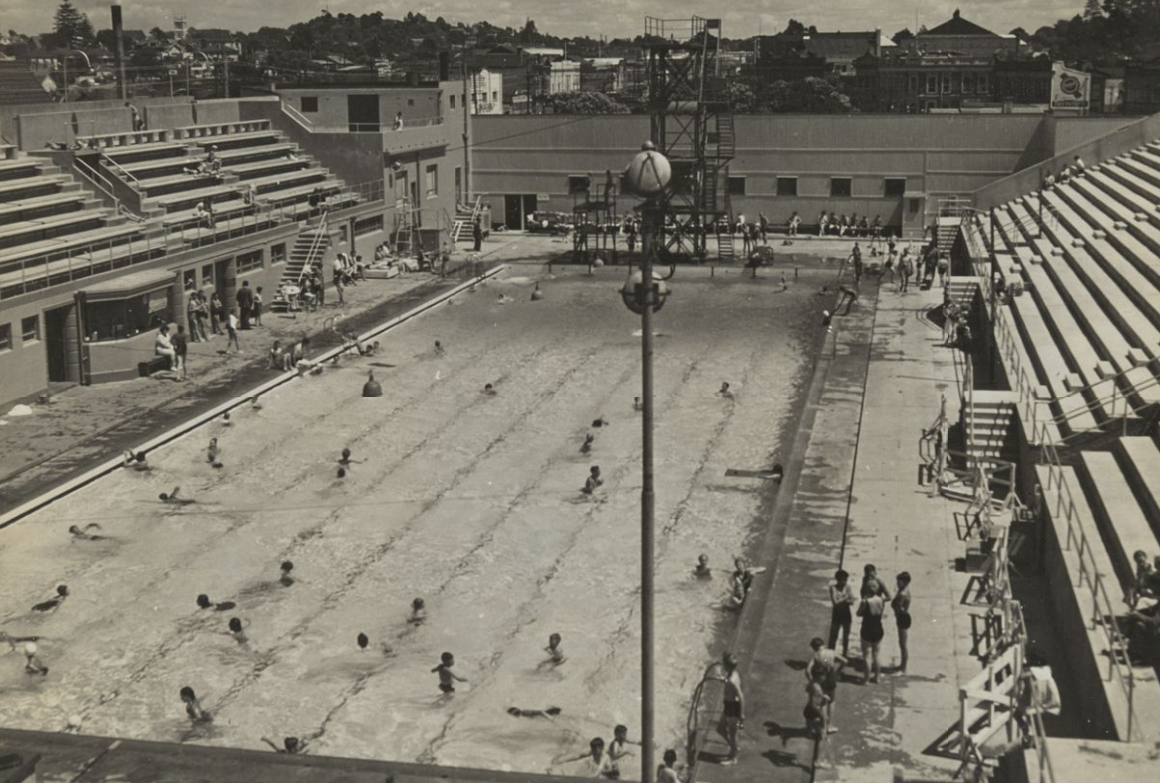
- January 1950. Auckland Libraries Heritage Collections
- Interactive map of Newmarket Olympic Pool
- Location: 77 Broadway, Newmarket, Auckland, New Zealand
- Coordinates: 36°51′57.3″S 174°46′42.8″E
- Owner: Auckland City Council
- Operator: Olympic Pool and Fitness Limited

Construction
- Built: 1939
- Opened: 1940
- Architect: N. F. Alcock

Tenant
- 1950 British Empire Games

The Newmarket Olympic Pool, today called The Olympic Pools and Fitness Centre, is a swimming pool in Newmarket, Auckland, New Zealand. It was constructed in 1939 and opened in 1940 and hosted the swimming, diving and water polo events at the 1950 British Empire Games.

== History ==
The Newmarket Olympic Pool was constructed in 1939 to the designs of the borough engineer N. F. Alcock. This Art deco building was opened by the Minister of Internal Affairs, the Hon William Parry in 1940. As well as being the borough's only public amenity the Olympic sized swimming pool was a great asset for the whole of Auckland.

The venue hosted the Aquatics at the 1950 British Empire Games.

The facility declined over the following decades and was near closure in 1992 but the Auckland City Council agreed a lease with Olympic Pool and Fitness Limited. After significant renovation, which included it being enclosed and a cinema complex constructed above, it re-opened on 5 March 1994.

In 2019 a further upgrade was planned with the demolition of the original concrete stadium steps in order to build new changing rooms, a sport shop and extension to the physio rooms. In 2024, a 10-year lease renewal was agreed between the Auckland City Council and Olympic Pool and Fitness Limited, who would continue to operate the facility until 2034.

== Gallery ==
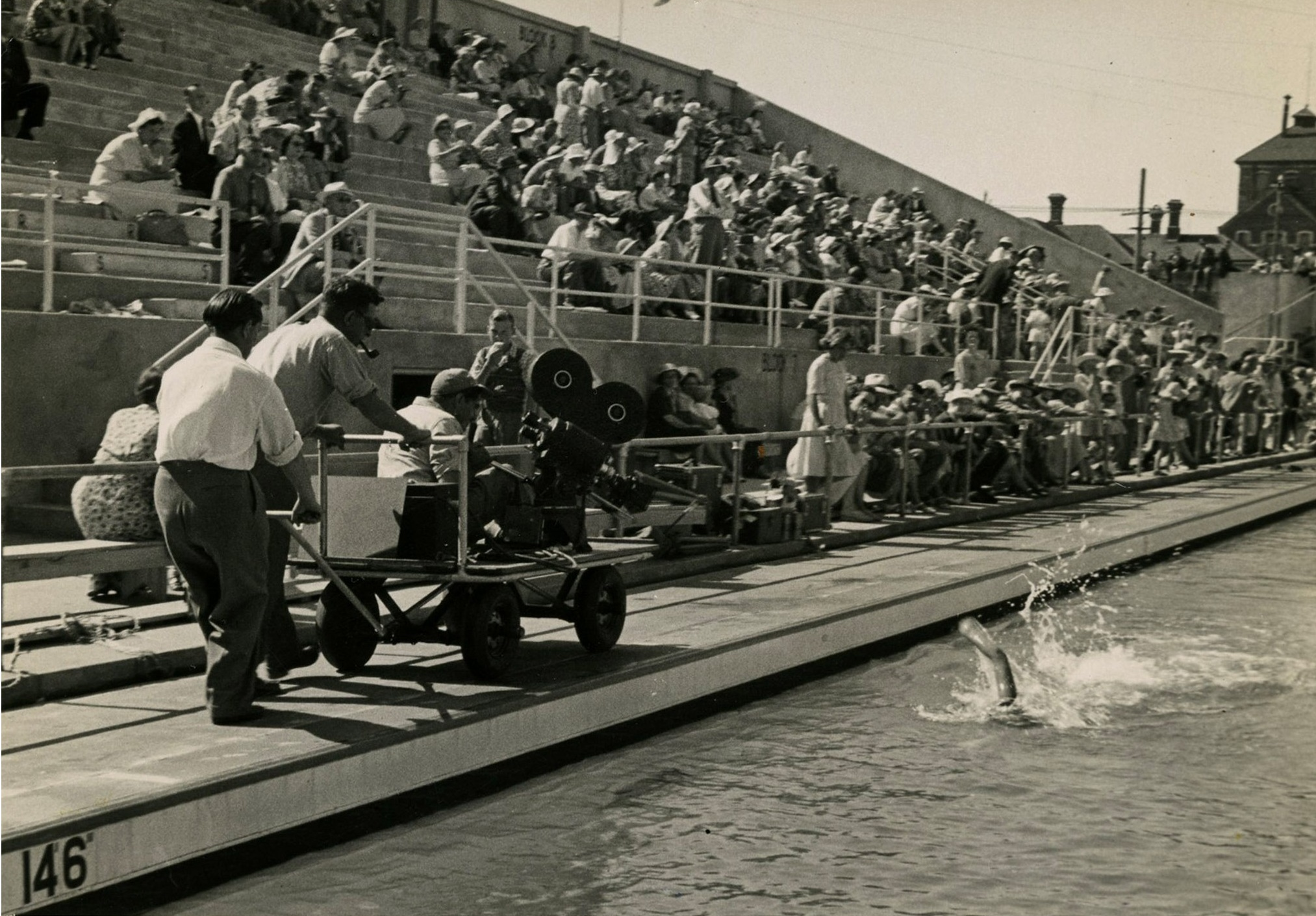
Filming during the 1950 British Empire Games

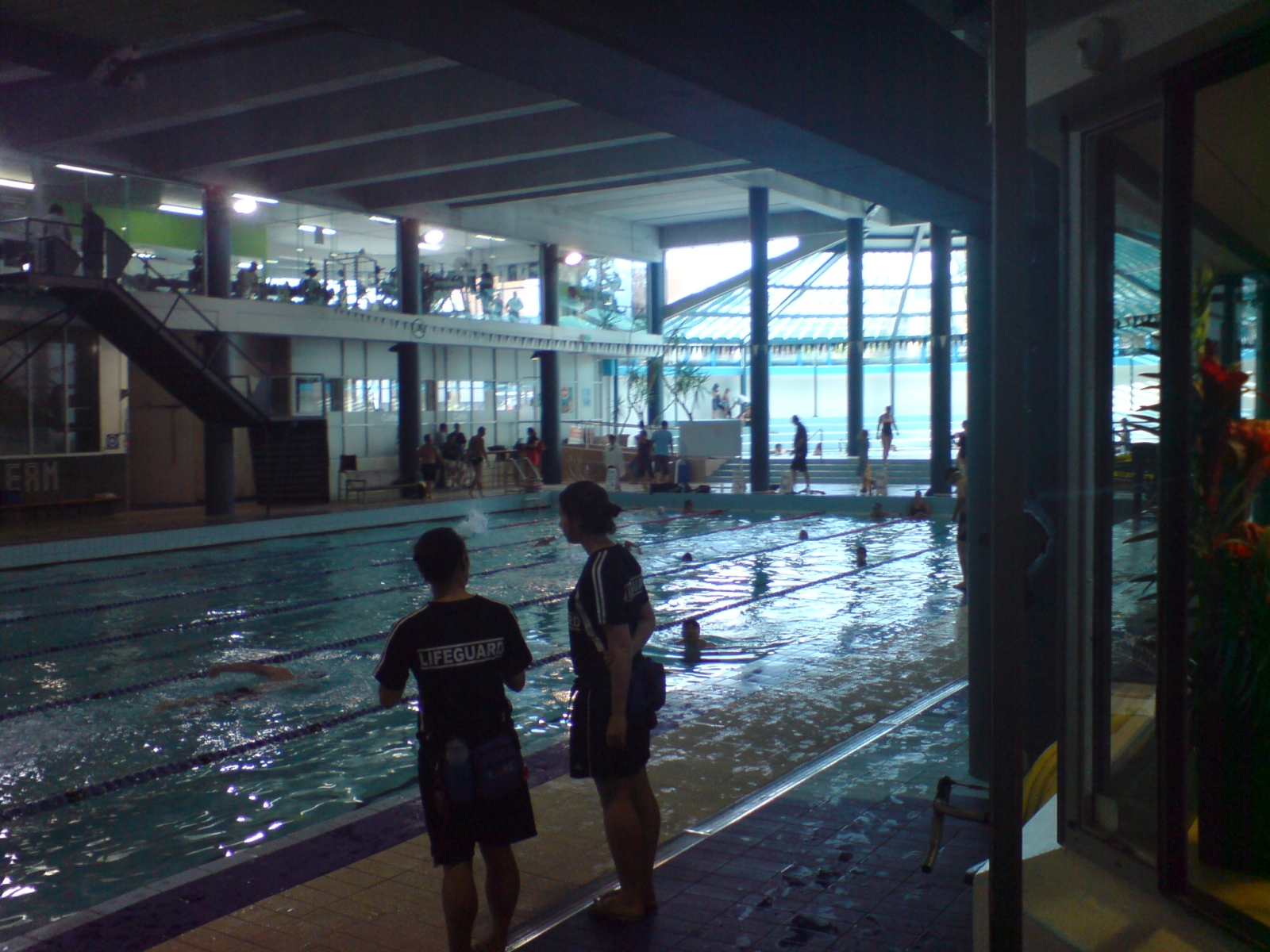
View of the pool. The art deco architecture was compromised by the enclosing of the structure

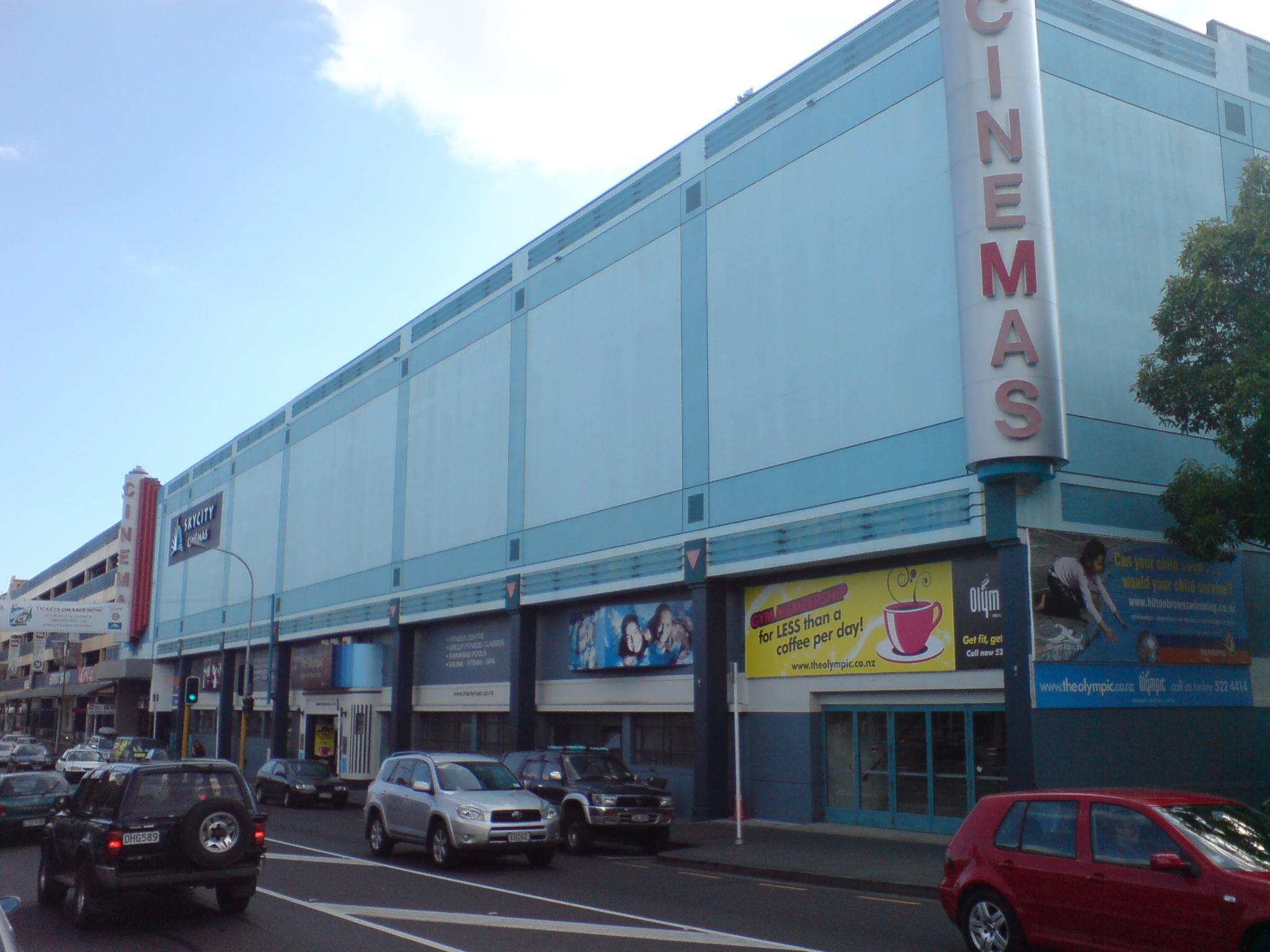
The cinema is above the pool

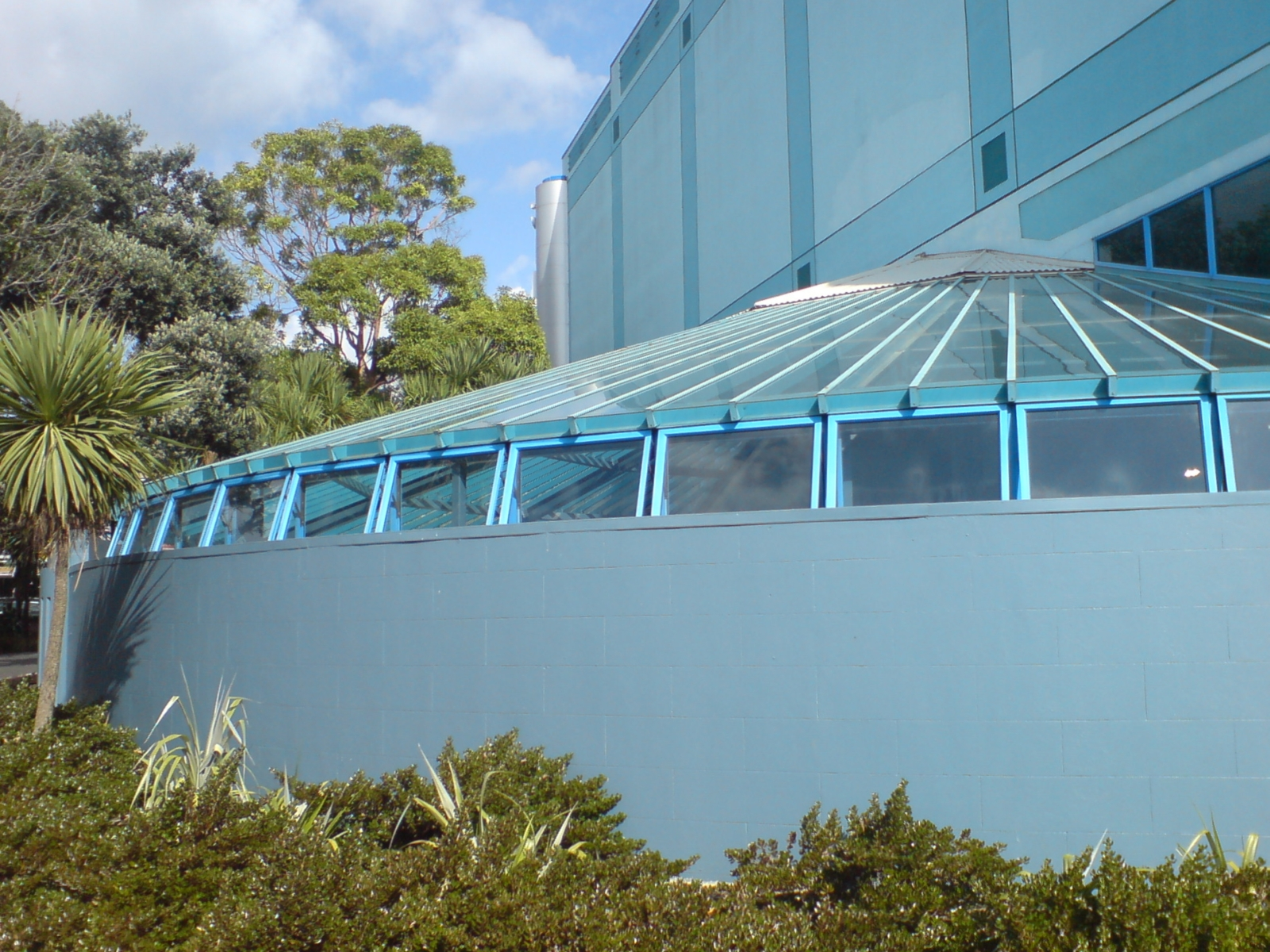
Outside the pool
