= Marjorie McQuade =

Australian swimmer

Personal information
- Full name: Marjorie Anne McQuade
- National team: Australia
- Born: 16 July 1934
- Died: 10 October 1997 (aged 63)

Sport
- Sport: Swimming
- Strokes: Freestyle
- Club: Melbourne Swimming Club
Medal record
Women's swimming
Representing Australia
British Empire Games
Gold medal – first place	1950 Auckland	110 yd freestyle
Gold medal – first place	1950 Auckland	4×110 yd freestyle
Gold medal – first place	1950 Auckland	3×110 yd medley

Marjorie Anne McQuade (16 July 1934 – 10 October 1997), later known by her married name Marjorie Bennett, was a competition swimmer who represented Australia at the 1948 Summer Olympics in London and the 1952 Summer Olympics in Helsinki.

At the 1950 British Empire Games in Auckland, New Zealand, McQuade was one of the standout performers for Australia, winning three gold medals. Individually, she won the women's 110-yard freestyle, and was a member of the winning Australian women's teams in the 4×110-yard freestyle relay and the 3×110-yard medley relay.

McQuade attended St Michael's School in St Kilda, Victoria. She is one of the St Michael's "notable alumni" and an "Old Michaelian". Her husband Peter Bennett was an Australian rules footballer and competed for Australia in water polo at the 1952 Olympics. She died on 10 October 1997.
