= 1950 British Empire Games =

Multi-sport event in Auckland, New Zealand

IV British Empire Games
- Host city: Auckland, New Zealand
- Nations: 12
- Athletes: 590
- Events: 87
- Opening: 4 February 1950
- Closing: 11 February 1950
- Opened by: Bernard Freyberg
- Athlete's Oath: Stan Lay
- Main venue: Eden Park

The 1950 British Empire Games were the fourth staging of what is now called the Commonwealth Games. It was held in Auckland, New Zealand, between 4 and 11 February 1950, after a 12-year gap from the third edition of the games due to World War II. The fourth games were originally awarded to Montreal, Canada and were to be held in 1942 but were cancelled due to the War.

The Games were declared open by Sir Bernard Freyberg. The opening ceremony was held at Eden Park and was sold out with 40,000 people attending. Eden Park also served as the main venue, while the closing ceremonies were held at Western Springs Stadium. Other venues included the Auckland Town Hall and the Newmarket Olympic Pool.

Total attendances were 246,694; higher than the following three Games, 1954 (159,636), 1958 (178,621) and 1962 (224,987).

A 1950 British Empire Games documentary film of the games was made by the New Zealand National Film Unit.

== Participating teams ==
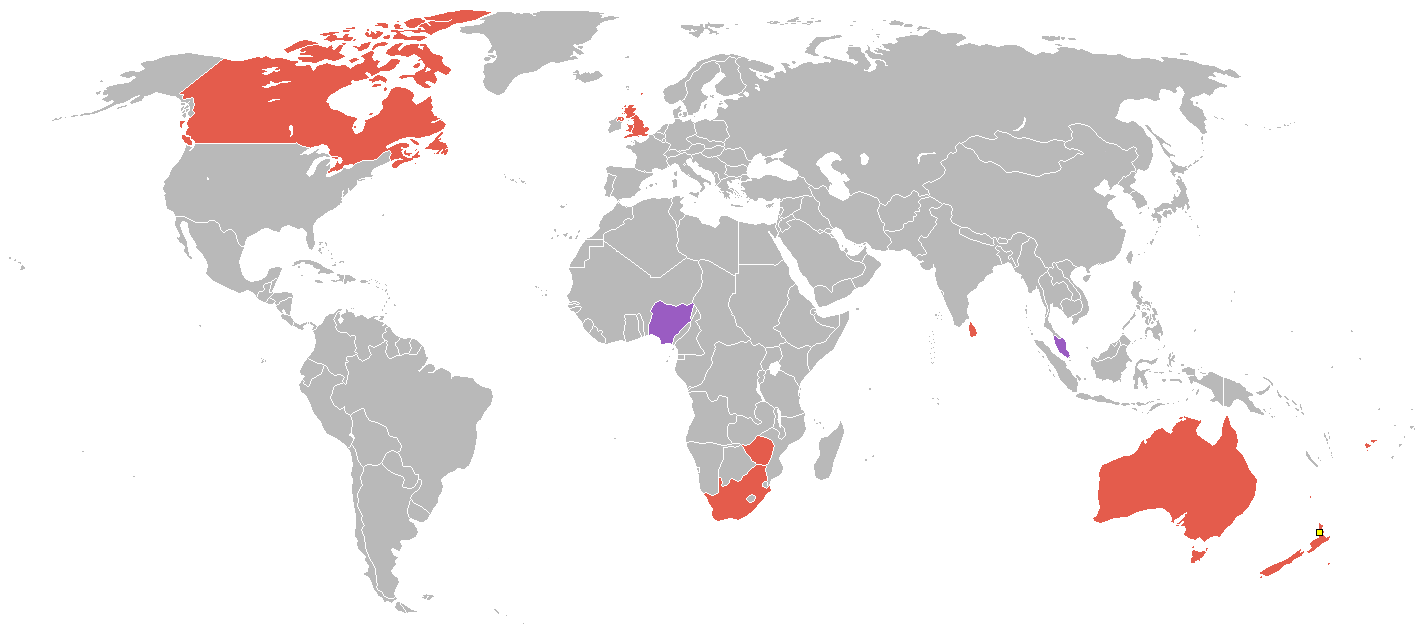
Countries that participated

- Australia
- Canada
- Ceylon
- England
- Fiji
- Malaya—first appearance
- New Zealand (host)
- Nigeria—first appearance
- Scotland
- South Africa
- Southern Rhodesia
- Wales

== Medal table ==
At the 1950 British Empire Games all the teams won at least one medal.

* Host nation (New Zealand)

Medals won by nation, ranked by number of golds—sortable
Rank	Nation	Gold	Silver	Bronze	Total
1	Australia	34	27	19	80
2	England	19	16	13	48
3	New Zealand*	10	22	21	53
4	Canada	8	9	13	30
5	South Africa	8	4	8	20
6	Scotland	5	3	2	10
7	Malaya	2	1	1	4
8	Fiji	1	2	2	5
9	Ceylon	1	2	1	4
10	Nigeria	0	1	0	1
10	Southern Rhodesia	0	1	0	1
10	Wales	0	1	0	1
Totals (12 entries)		88	89	80	257

== Sports ==
- Aquatics ()
  - Diving ()
  - Swimming ()
  - Water polo ()
- Athletics ()
- Boxing ()
- Cycling ()
- Fencing ()
- Lawn bowls ()
- Rowing ()
- Weightlifting ()
- Wrestling ()

== Venues ==
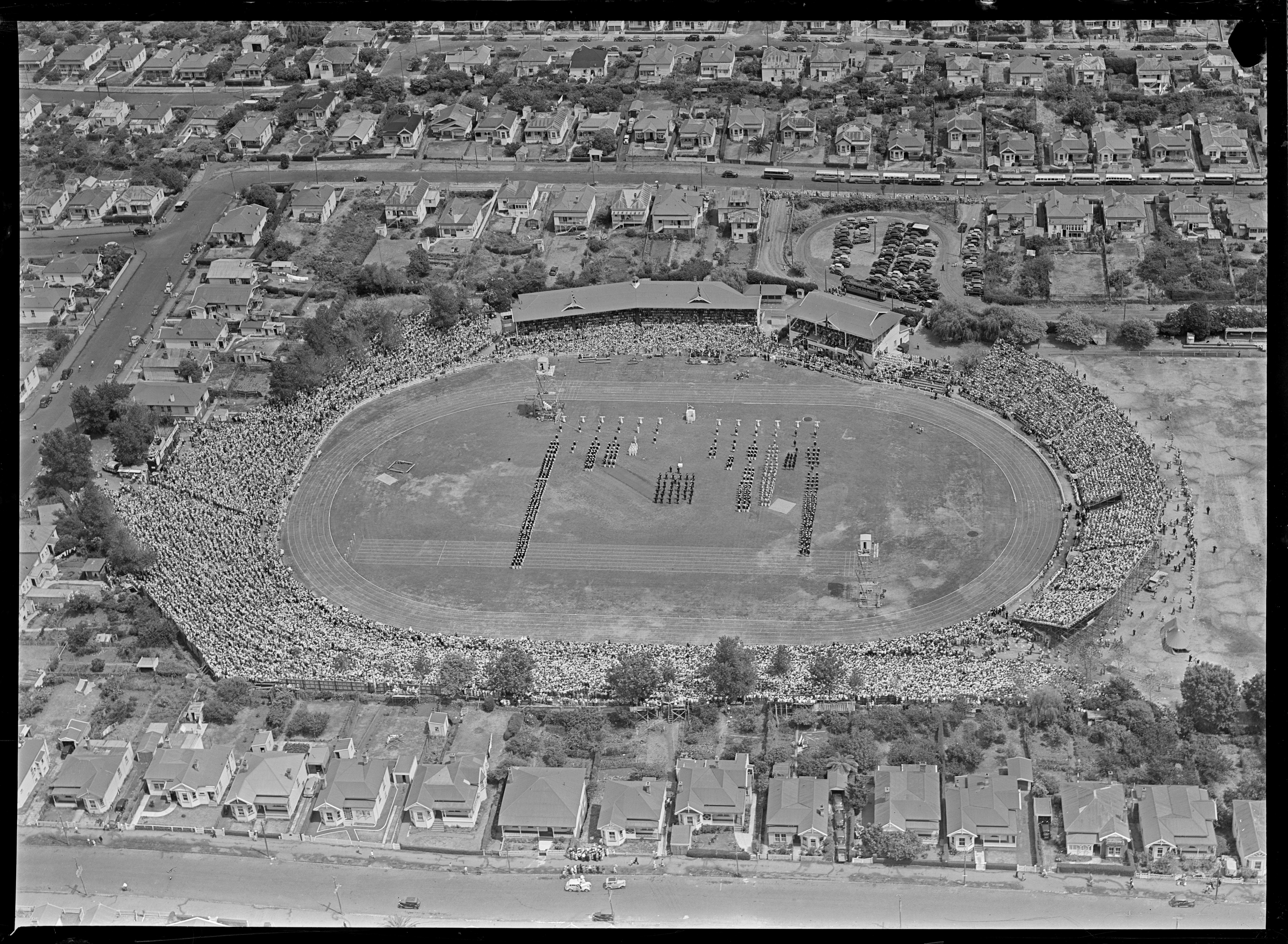
The opening ceremony of the 1950 British Empire Games.

- Eden Park (opening ceremony and athletics)
- Auckland Town Hall (Great Hall) (boxing and wrestling)
- Auckland Town Hall (Concert Chamber) (weightlifting)
- The Auckland City Drill Hall, Rutland Street (fencing)
- Western Springs Stadium (cycling and the closing ceremony)
- Lake Karapiro (rowing)
- Newmarket Olympic Pool (swimming, diving & water polo)
- Carlton BC and Remuera BC (lawn bowls)
- Accommodation was at the Ardmore Teachers' Training College, 23 miles (37 kilometres) away at South Auckland.

Preceded by Sydney	British Empire Games; Auckland; IV British Empire Games	Succeeded by Vancouver
