= Athletics at the 1950 British Empire Games – Men's 3 miles =

Men's 3 miles at the 1950 British Empire Games
- Venue: Eden Park
- Date: 7 February 1950
- Winning time: 14:23.6

Medalists
gold medal	Len Eyre	England
silver medal	Harold Nelson	New Zealand
bronze medal	Anthony Chivers	England

The men's 3 miles event at the 1950 British Empire Games was held on 7 February at the Eden Park in Auckland, New Zealand.

== Results ==
Rank	Name	Nationality	Time	Notes
1st place, gold medalist(s)	Len Eyre	England	14:23.6	
2nd place, silver medalist(s)	Harold Nelson	New Zealand	14:27.8	
3rd place, bronze medalist(s)	Anthony Chivers	England	14:28.1	
4	Alan Merrett	Australia	14:34.0	
5	Ken MacDonald	Australia	14:35.9	
6	Colin Lousich	New Zealand	14:41.0	
7	Leslie Perry	Australia	??:??.?	
?	Noel Taylor	New Zealand	??:??.?	
?	George Hoskins	New Zealand	??:??.?	
?	Andrew Forbes	Scotland	??:??.?	
	William Emmerton	Australia	DNF	
	Richard Ferguson	Canada	DNF	
