= Athletics at the 1950 British Empire Games – Men's 6 miles =

Men's 6 miles at the 1950 British Empire Games
- Venue: Eden Park
- Date: 5 February 1950
- Winning time: 30:29.6

Medalists
gold medal	Harold Nelson	New Zealand
silver medal	Andrew Forbes	Scotland
bronze medal	Noel Taylor	New Zealand

The men's 6 miles event at the 1950 British Empire Games was held on 5 February at the Eden Park in Auckland, New Zealand.

== Results ==
Rank	Name	Nationality	Time	Notes
1st place, gold medalist(s)	Harold Nelson	New Zealand	30:29.6	
2nd place, silver medalist(s)	Andrew Forbes	Scotland	30:31.9	
3rd place, bronze medalist(s)	Noel Taylor	New Zealand	30:31.9	
4	John Davey	Australia	30:34.7	
5	Alan Merrett	Australia	30:46.3	
6	Anthony Chivers	England	31:15.2	
7	Jack Holden	England	??:??.?	
8	Syd Luyt	South Africa	??:??.?	
9	John Pottage	Australia	??:??.?	
10	Paul Collins	Canada	??:??.?	
11	George Norman	Canada	??:??.?	
12	Walter Fedorick	Canada	??:??.?	
	Colin Lousich	New Zealand	DNF	
	Gérard Côté	Canada	DNS	
	George Hoskins	New Zealand	DNS	
