= Noel Taylor (athlete) =

New Zealand long-distance runner

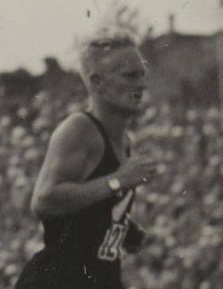
- Taylor in 1950

Personal information
- Born: Clifford Noel Taylor; 20 December 1923 Palmerston North, New Zealand
- Died: 23 November 2023 (aged 99) Pukekohe, New Zealand
- Education: Hutt Valley High School

Sport
- Country: New Zealand
- Sport: Track and field

Achievements and titles
- National finals: 6 miles champion (1950, 1952); Cross-country champion (1948, 1949, 1952)
Medal record
Men's athletics
Representing New Zealand
British Empire Games
Bronze medal – third place	1950 Auckland	6 miles

Clifford Noel Taylor (20 December 1923 – 23 November 2023) was a New Zealand long-distance runner who won a bronze medal representing his country at the 1950 British Empire Games.

== Early life and family ==
Born in Palmerston North on 20 December 1923, Taylor was the son of Ellen (Nellie) Taylor (née Leese) and Horace Arthur Andrew Taylor. He was the nephew of Lew Taylor, who was a military and civil pilot and served as director of Civil Aviation from 1964 to 1972.

After four years in Palmerston North, Taylor moved with his family to Lower Hutt, and was educated at Hutt Valley High School, where he won the school's junior one-mile championship in 1938. Aged 15, he sustained severe lacerations to his head when he ran into the back of a parked baker's van while riding his bicycle. He studied aeronautical engineering at night school, and gained employment with de Havilland at Rongotai not long after they opened in 1940.

After working as a shepherd for a time, he joined the New Zealand Army, but was later transferred to the Royal New Zealand Air Force through the influence of his uncle. He saw service in the Green Islands with a Ventura servicing unit.

== Athletics career ==
Taylor was a member of the Hutt Valley Harriers, winning the junior club title in 1941, and the senior title the next year.

Returning to athletics after the war, Taylor won the national cross-country title in 1948, 1949 and 1952. He also won the New Zealand national 6-mile track title in both 1950 and 1952.

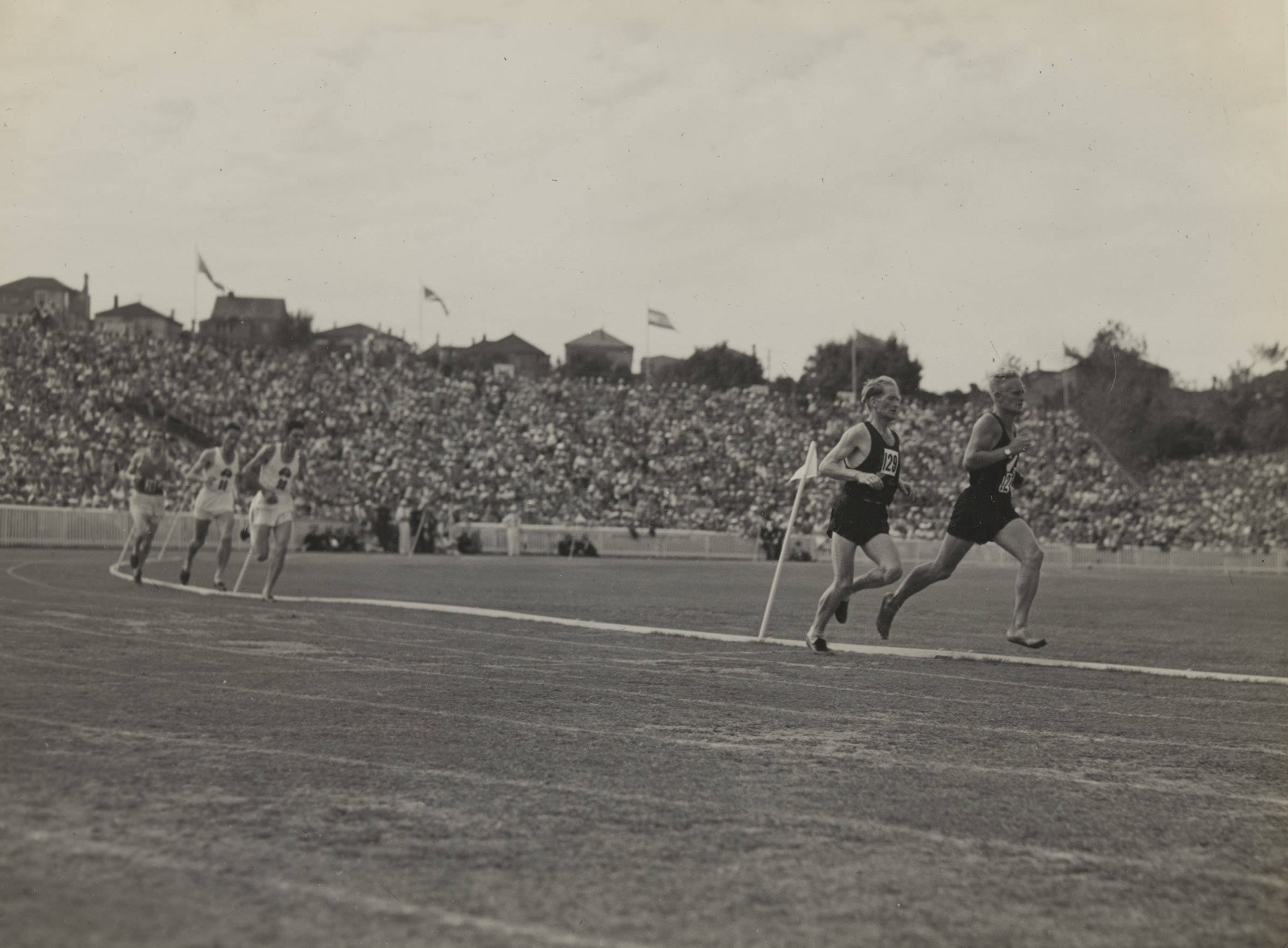
Taylor, running barefooted, leading Harold Nelson on lap 16 of the men's 6 mile at the 1950 British Empire Games at Eden Park, Auckland

At the 1950 British Empire Games, Taylor represented New Zealand in the men's three miles and six miles events. He raced barefooted, and finished third in the six miles, in a time of 30:31.9, behind teammate Harold Nelson and Andrew Forbes from Scotland. Two days later, in the three miles, he placed eleventh.

At the end of 1950, Taylor competed in the two-mile and 5000-metre events at the Canterbury Centennial Games in Christchurch, but did not feature among the place getters.

Taylor continued running competitively until at least 1956, winning the annual race to the top of Mount Maunganui six times from six starts, lowering his winning time on each occasion.

== Later life ==
Taylor participated in motor racing until the age of 75. He died in Pukekohe on 23 November 2023, less than a month before his 100th birthday.
