= Maumaupaki =

Coordinates: 36°58′09″S 175°34′38″E

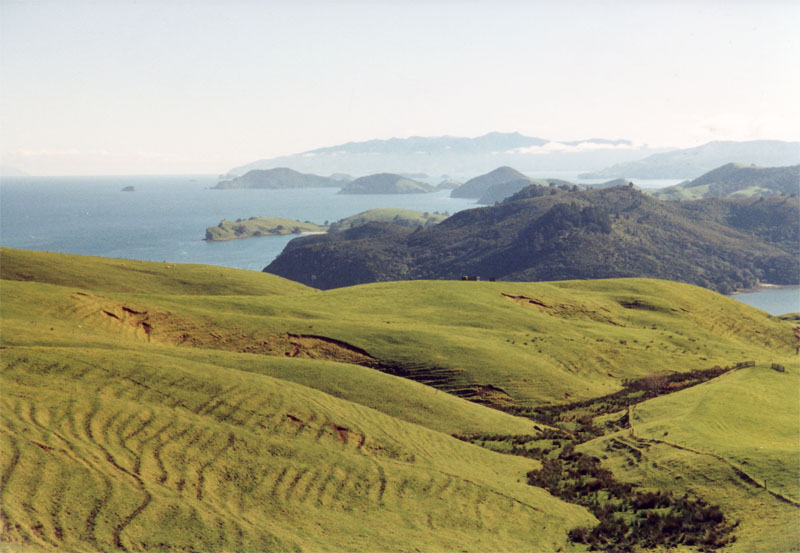
The Coromandel Peninsula

Maumaupaki is a mountain in New Zealand 819 m (2687 ft.) above sea level in the North Island.

It is in the Coromandel Range on the Coromandel Peninsula. The mountain is about 40 km (25 mi) from the town of Thames.
