= Athletics at the 1950 British Empire Games – Men's 1 mile =

Men's 1 mile at the 1950 British Empire Games
- Venue: Eden Park
- Start date: 9 February 1950
- End date: 11 February 1950
- Winning time: 4:11.0

Medalists
gold medal	Bill Parnell	Canada
silver medal	Len Eyre	England
bronze medal	Maurice Marshall	New Zealand

The men's 1 mile event at the 1950 British Empire Games was held on 9 and 11 February at the Eden Park in Auckland, New Zealand.

== Medalists ==
Gold	Silver	Bronze
Bill Parnell; Canada	Len Eyre; England	Maurice Marshall; New Zealand

== Results ==
=== Heats ===
Qualification: First 4 in each heat (Q) qualify directly for the final.

Rank	Heat	Name	Nationality	Time	Notes
1	1	Len Eyre	England	4:19.2	Q
2	1	John Marks	Australia	4:19.4	Q
3	1	John Sinclair	New Zealand	4:19.8	Q
4	1	Jack Hutchins	Canada	4:20.8	Q
5	1	Victor Plummer	Australia	4:21.8	
6	1	Neil Bates	New Zealand	4:25.8	
7	1	A. Somapala	Ceylon	?:??.?	
	1	Kenneth MacDonald	Australia	DNS	
	1	John Parlett	England	DNS	
	1	Andrew Forbes	Scotland	DNS	
1	2	Bill Parnell	Canada	4:15.4	Q
2	2	Don MacMillan	Australia	4:15.4	Q
3	2	Tom White	England	4:16.6	Q
4	2	Maurice Marshall	New Zealand	4:16.8	Q
5	2	Richard Ferguson	Canada	4:17.2	
6	2	Cliff Simpson	New Zealand	4:26.6	
7	2	Ian Johnson	Southern Rhodesia	?:??.?	

=== Final ===
Rank	Name	Nationality	Time	Notes
1st place, gold medalist(s)	Bill Parnell	Canada	4:11.0	GR
2nd place, silver medalist(s)	Len Eyre	England	4:11.8	
3rd place, bronze medalist(s)	Maurice Marshall	New Zealand	4:13.2	
4	John Marks	Australia	4:14.8	
5	Tom White	England	4:15.0	
6	John Sinclair	New Zealand	4:20.0	
7	Don MacMillan	Australia	?:??.?	
8	Jack Hutchins	Canada	?:??.?	
