= Waiwhango River =

Coordinates: 36°43′S 175°28′E

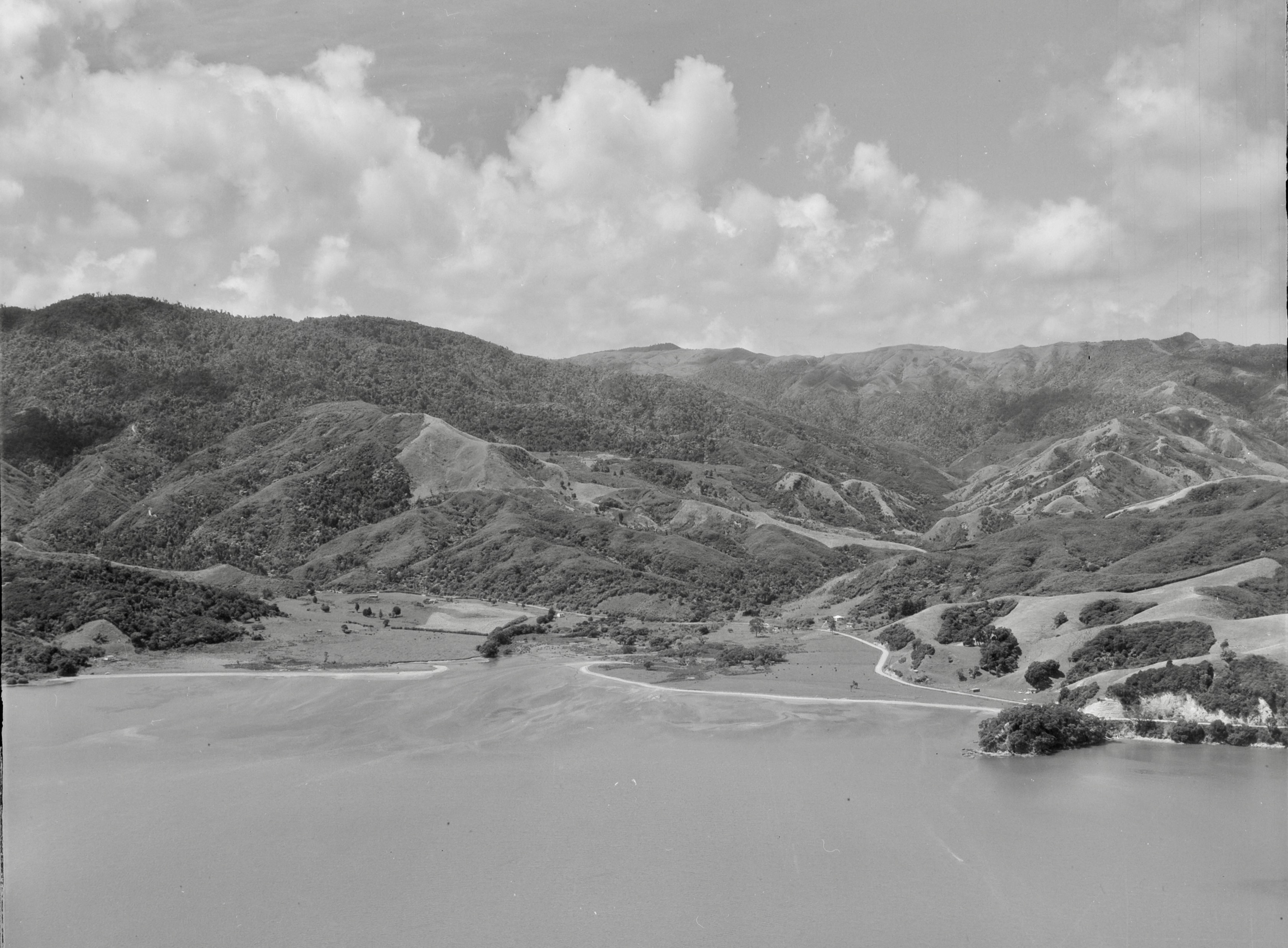
- Koputauaki Bay and Waiwhango River valley in 1965

Location
- Country: New Zealand

Physical characteristics
- Source
  - location: Coromandel Range
  - elevation: 514 m (1,686 ft)
- Mouth
  - location: Hautapu Channel, Hauraki Gulf
  - elevation: 0 m (0 ft)
- Length: 8 km (5.0 mi)

The Waiwhango River is a river of the northern Coromandel Peninsula, in the Waikato Region of New Zealand's North Island. It flows generally southwest to reach the small Koputauaki Bay on the Hautapu Channel five kilometres northwest of Coromandel.

In the 19th century some logging was done and gold, silver and copper were found in the area, but workings were limited and a large kauri tree was noted to be still growing in 1931.

After Cyclone Gabrielle in 2023 a debris dam built up. It was released by helicopters breaching the dam with monsoon buckets. As a precaution some houses were evacuated and the road closed.

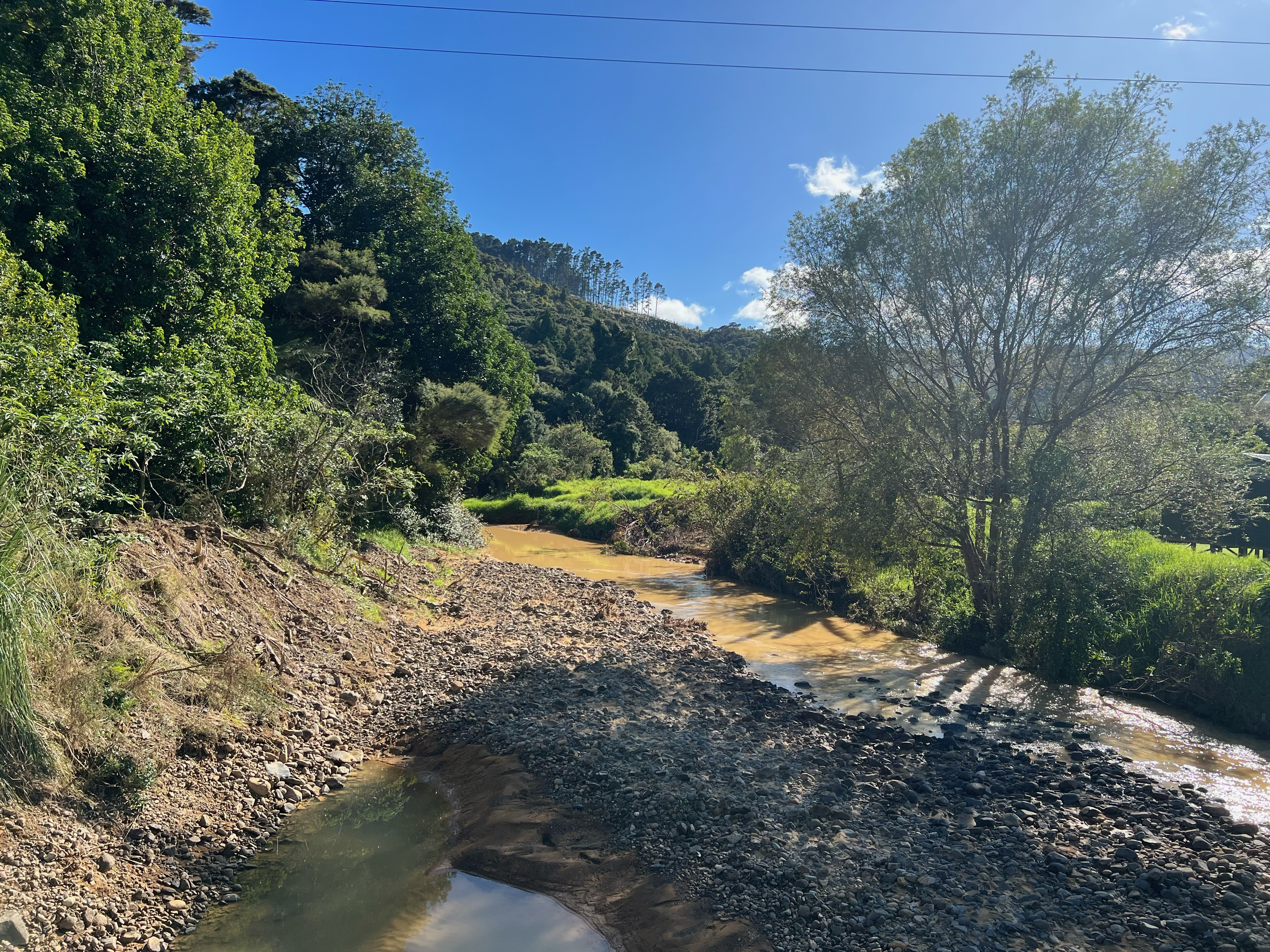
Waiwhango River from Colville Rd bridge after Cyclone Gabrielle in 2023

== See also ==
- List of rivers of New Zealand
