= Mangakino caldera complex =

Volcanic caldera in New Zealand

Mangakino Caldera
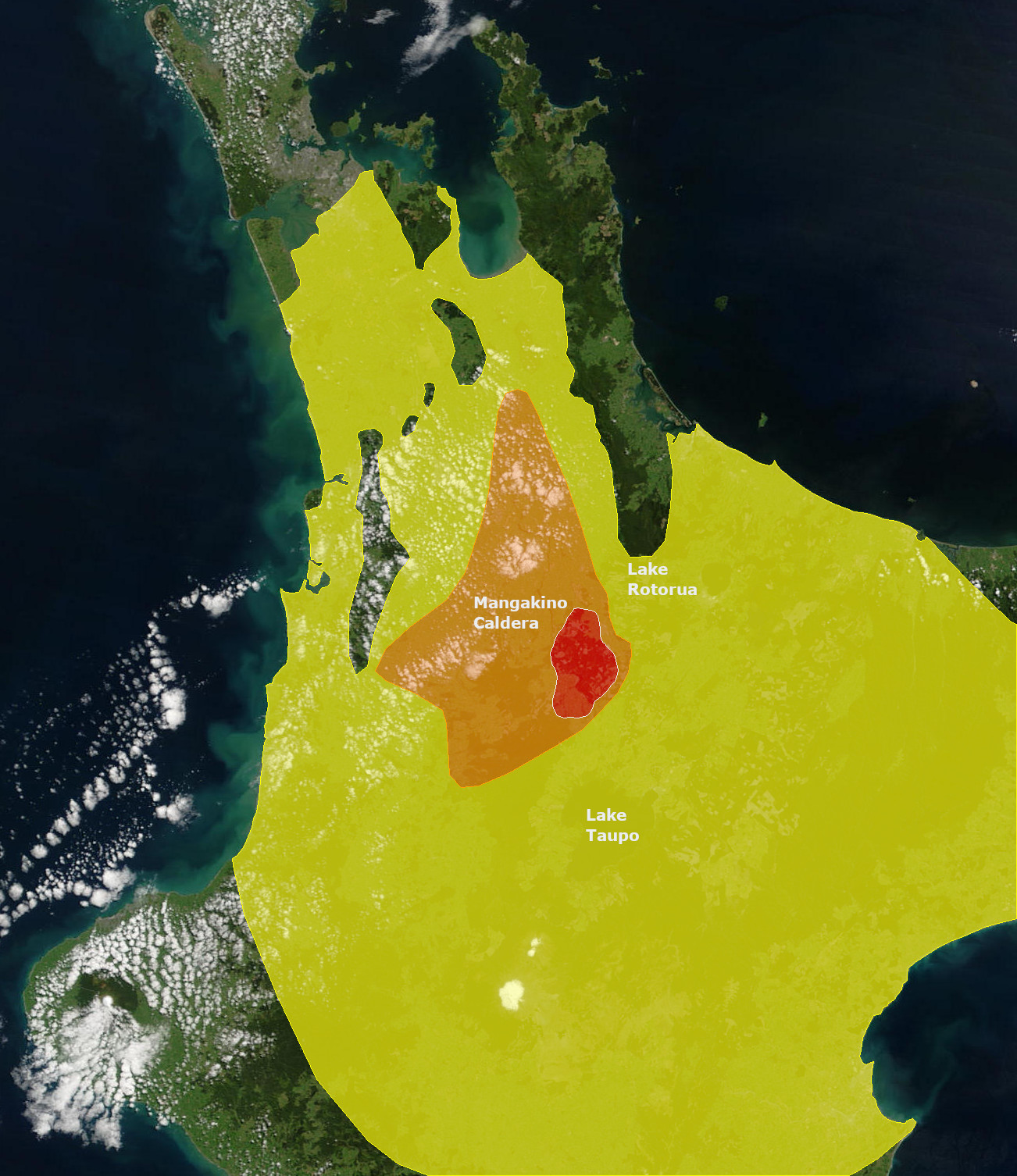
- Approximate extent of ignimbrite sheets from Kidnappers (yellow) and Rocky Hill eruptions (orange) as determined from land drill cores sampling. The Kidnappers ignimbrite has been reported in some cores from just beyond the boundaries shown and this map only tries to show where there was full coverage of the then existing landforms and present land surface to convey an idea of the minimal total biosphere disruption.

Highest point
- Coordinates: 38°23′S 175°47′E

Dimensions
- Length: 30 km (19 mi)
- Width: 15 km (9.3 mi)

Geography
- Location within North Island
- Location: North Island, New Zealand

Geology
- Rock age: Pleistocene (1.6–0.93 Ma)
- Mountain type: Caldera
- Volcanic zone: Taupō Volcanic Zone
- Last eruption: 900,000 years ago

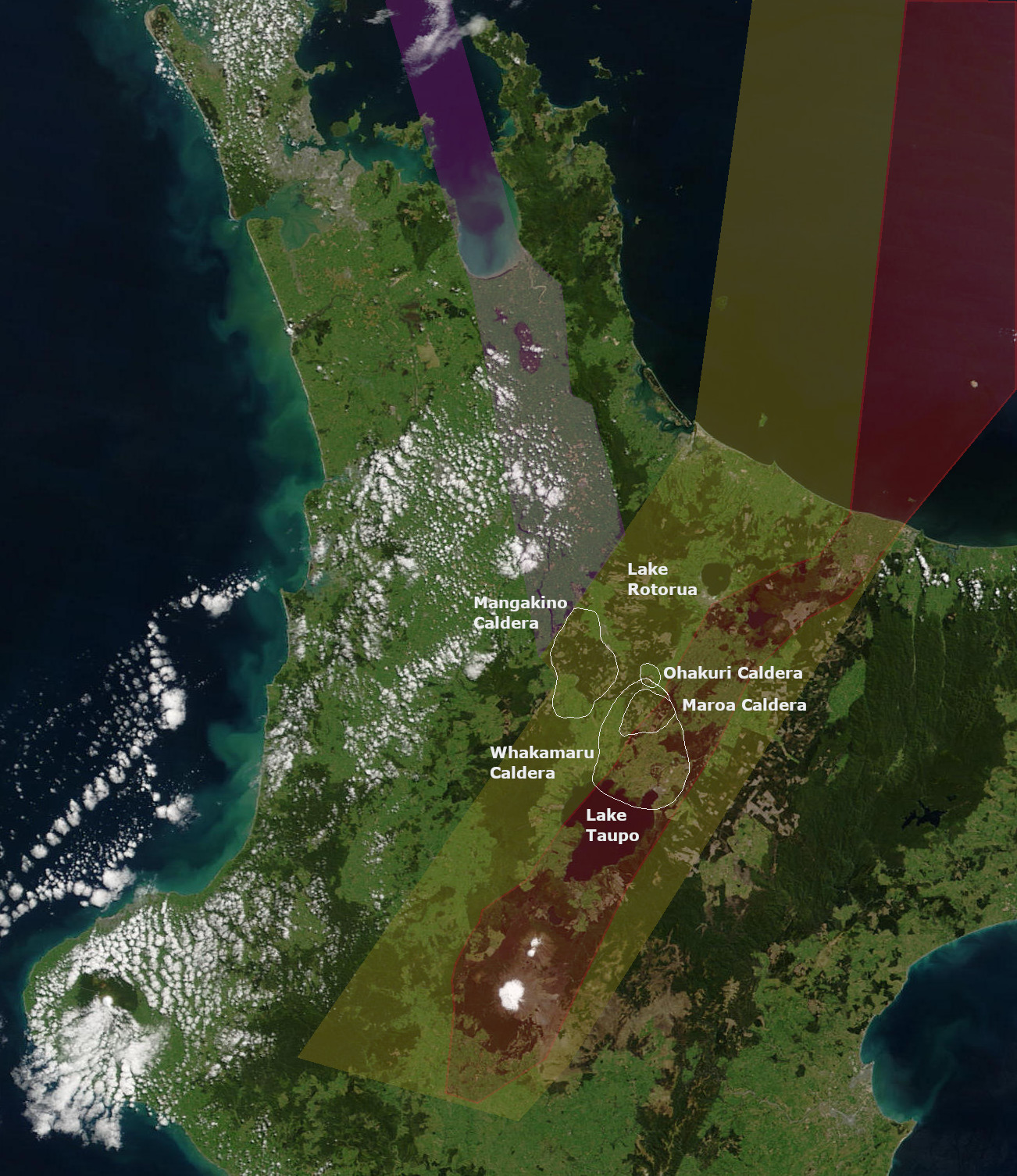
Mangakino Caldera north of Lake Taupō in the old Taupō Rift (yellow shading). Also shown to its east are the Whakamaru caldera, the more recent Maroa Caldera contained within it and the Ohakuri Caldera which had a paired eruption with the Rotorua Caldera. Also shown is the modern Taupō Rift (red shading), Hauraki Rift (purple shading) and landmarks of Lake Taupō and Lake Rotorua

The Mangakino caldera complex (other names are Mangakino volcanic center, Mangakino Caldera) is the westernmost and one of oldest extinct rhyolitic caldera volcanoes in the Taupō Volcanic Zone of New Zealand's North Island. It produced about a million years ago (1 Ma) in the Kidnappers eruption of 1,200 km^{3} (287.9 cu mi), the most widespread ignimbrite deposits on Earth being over 45,000 km^{2} (17,000 sq mi) in area. This eruption was closely followed in time by the smaller 200 km^{3} (48.0 cu mi) Rocky Hill eruption. The Kidnappers eruption had an estimated VEI of 8 and has been assigned a total eruption volume (not just tephra) of 2,760 km^{3} (662.2 cu mi).

However this was only in its most recent caldera forming phase from 1.21 to 0.91 million years ago as it had its earliest caldera generating phase from 1.62 to 1.51 million years ago. There are at least 11 major historic eruptions assigned to this complex. At least 5 of these contributed significant welded ignimbrite deposits that represent major pyroclastic events in the central North Island. Ongatiti Ignimbrite (Hinuera Stone) from a 7 VEI event, about 1.3 million years ago, has now been found over a wider area and several meter thick tephra deposits from the eruption exist on drill samples from both Auckland and Wellington.

The earliest characterised eruptives from the complex are andesitic and the mechanism of transition from this to the more explosive later rhyolitic eruptions is related to increased heat flow from the magma sources.

Later many of these deposits were covered over by deposits from other eruptive centres such as those of the Oruanui eruption.

The caldera can be defined by gravitational measurements as 30 km (19 mi) by 15 km (9.3 mi) and its "basement" floor is at least 4 km (2.5 mi) below the present ground surface.

Assigned eruptions for the Mangakino Caldera (note Unit F not definitely assigned)
Formations	Layer names	Age range estimate by various methods (if only one method ± error)	Eruptive volume
Marshall	Unit I (Marshall A and B) Ignimbrite; Unit H (Kaahu) Ignimbrite; Unit G	0.95 ± 0.03 Ma	
Whakaahu	Rhyolite dome	1.02 ± 0.02 Ma	
Raepahu (Potaka Tephra)	Rocky Hill Ignimbrite; Kidnappers Unit E Ignimbrite and fall deposit	0.95 to 1.15 Ma 0.93 to 1.07 Ma	200 cubic kilometres (48 cu mi) >1,200 cubic kilometres (290 cu mi)
Mangaokewa	Ahuroa Ignimbrite; Unit D Ignimbrite and fall deposit	1.16 to 1.33 Ma; 1.20 ± 0.04 Ma	
Ongatiti	Ongatiti Ignimbrite (Oparau tephra, K12a Kauroa Ash Formation, K12); Tumai Rd dome	1.37 ± 0.04 Ma (1.31 ± 0.09 Ma, 1.38 ± 0.06 Ma, 1.38 ± 0.05 Ma); 1.16 to 1.34 Ma; 1.27 ± 0.05 Ma	>1,000 cubic kilometres (240 cu mi) DRE
Pouakani	Unit C Ignimbrite	1.68 ± 0.07 Ma (This age inconsistent with position)	
Tolley	Unit B Ignimbrite	1.53 ± 0.04 Ma	
Ngaroma	Ngaroma (Unit A) Ignimbrite	1.31 to 1.6 Ma	
Link (source unknown)	Unit F Ignimbrite	1.60 ± 0.09 Ma	

Map of selected surface volcanic deposits centered to include all the present surface Mangakino caldera ignimbrites. Tephra and buried ignimbrite from these eruptions were even more widespread as illustrated elsewhere on this page. The present surface ignimbrite is various light violet shades which are identical for any single source, but other eruptions breakup the mutual ignimbrite sheets. Legend: Key for the volcanics that are shown with panning is: basalt (shades of brown/orange); monogenetic basalts; undifferentiated basalts of the Tangihua Complex in Northland Allochthon; arc basalts; arc ring basalts; dacite; andesite (shades of red); basaltic andesite; rhyolite (ignimbrite is lighter shades of violet); plutonic; White shading is selected caldera features.; Clicking on the rectangle icon enables full window and mouse-over with volcano name/wikilink and ages before present.

== Geological understanding ==
That there was a separate Mangakino volcanic complex was first understood in 1965, and a caldera structure by gravity studies in 1982. The recognition was impaired mainly because of erosion produced discontinuities, burying by later volcanic deposits or overburden displacement in later caldera formation. The extent of eastern ignimbrite deposits from the early Ongatiti event is still unknown and even the eastern caldera boundary is ill defined due to the very disruptive margins of the new Taupō Rift to the east of the complex. At Tokoroa to the complexes north, Ongatiti ignimibrite is for example found at a depth of between 392 to 457 m (1,286 to 1,499 ft).

What are now termed ignimbrites and manifest as prominent surface deposits, far from the complex, were recognised by Ferdinand von Hochstetter in his 1859 maps. From the early 1960s the various ignimbrites from the complex were assigned names and studied in more detail. Colin Wilson first defined the Mangakino caldera complex in 1984 and went on to improve the understanding of its ignimbrite distribution and stratigraphy. Reliable age data became available from the 1990s. It was in the late 1990s that it first became recognised that the size of the eruptions had been underestimated, but not until 2016–17 that proof of super eruptions was presented.

The Mangakino caldera eruptives are definitely assignable to the Taupō Volcanic Zone but are to the west of the currently most active portion of the Taupō Rift. To its north the transition between the north-western Taupō Rift and the Coromandel Volcanic Zone via the Tauranga Volcanic Centre and its 2.1 million year old Waiteariki Formation are subject to on going study.
