= Tauranga Volcanic Centre =

Volcanic area in New Zealand

- Map of selected surface volcanic features of the Tauranga Volcanic Centre alone (see other map on this page for volcanic relationships). Much of the centre to the south is buried under the Mamaku ignimbrite from the Rotorua Caldera which may extend even to Matakana Island in Tauranga Harbour. There is one basaltic centre (gray) on the island. The buried approximate outline of the postulated Omanawa Caldera which likely contributed to Centre ignimbrites is in pale white towards present Lake Rotorua. Brown shows the Waiteariki Ignimbrite. If you click on the map you will enable mouseover of volcano feature/wikilink. Characterised vents are black rectangles. Rhyolite fields from known vents is in red (geologically typed as Minden rhyolite) and andesite from the Otawa Formation is pink. Purple is Papamoa Ignimbrites.

Highest point
- Coordinates: 37°42′47″S 176°02′38″E

Geography
- Location within North Island
- Location: North Island, New Zealand

Geology
- Rock age: 2.4–1.9 Ma
- Mountain type: Multiple
- Volcanic zone: Taupō Volcanic Zone
- Last eruption: 1.9 Ma

The Tauranga Volcanic Centre is a geologic region in New Zealand's Bay of Plenty. It extends from the southern end of Waihi Beach and from the old volcanoes of the Coromandel Peninsula that make up the northern part of the Kaimai Range, towards the Taupō Volcanic Zone.

It was the site, about 2.1 million years ago, of the large single eruption event of Waiteariki ignimbrite with DRE of 870 ± 87 km^{3} (209 ± 21 cu mi).

== Geology ==
Map of selected volcanic features of the Tauranga Volcanic Centre, allowing wider volcanic context but therefore with different shading to the other map on this page. Legend: Key for the volcanics that are shown with panning is: basalt (shades of brown/orange); monogenetic basalts; undifferentiated basalts of the Tangihua Complex in Northland Allochthon; arc basalts; arc ring basalts; dacite; andesite (shades of red); basaltic andesite; rhyolite (ignimbrite is lighter shades of violet); plutonic; White shading is selected caldera features.; Clicking on the rectangle icon enables full window and mouse-over with volcano name/wikilink and ages before present.

The Tauranga Volcanic Centre is at the intersection of the Hauraki and Taupō Rifts and was active during a period of tectonic transition from 2.95 to 1.9 million years ago when major volcanism moved south in Zealandia from the Coromandel Volcanic Zone. It thus has importance geologically as a region of transition, previously classified as part of the Central Volcanic Region, which appears to have commenced as early as 4.5 million years ago from compositional analysis of sea floor eruptives.

Part of it to the north west is sometimes defined separately in the literature as the Kaimai Volcanic Centre. However this now seems an artificial distinction as the activity and volcanic rock types over lap in time and type. For example the Waiteariki Formation is ignimbrite whose associated tephra must almost certainly have come from a now buried super volcano event at the north eastern margins of the old Taupō Rift, and it makes up much of the southern Kaimai Range where not covered by younger rhyolite. There is an area of strongly negative Bouguer gravity anomaly between Katikati and Matakana Island in Tauranga Harbour which could also be a buried caldera structure related to Tauranga Volcanic Centre activity. The Omanawa Caldera is inferred by an area of gravity and magnetic anomaly that exists to the north-west of the Rotorua Caldera, and this postulated feature buried perhaps under over a hundred meters of Mamaku ignimbrite from the Rotorua Caldera defines the southern portion of the Centre

The Waiteariki ignimbrite erupted 2.1 million years ago. but there are at least eight other large eruptions that occurred in the Tauranga Volcanic Centre in its period of activity. Along with the eroded andesitic stratovolcano that resulted in the Otawa Formation at least 17 rhyolite-rhyodacite lava dome complexes contribute to what has been called the Minden rhyolite subgroup. To add complexity, like presently found in currently active caldera complexes in the Taupō Volcanic Zone, are the distinct Papamoa ignimbrite formations (dated to 2.21 ± 0.1 million years ago) and a small basalt lava flow on Matakana Island (dated to 2.7 ± 0.1 million years ago). Mount Maunganui that forms one of the heads of the main entrance to Tauranga Harbour erupted 2.35 ± 0.06 million years ago and is the most recognised volcano of the Centre but other volcanoes nearby have been used as Pās by the Māori.

Compositional analysis has linked the Maungatūtū/Mount Misery dome that is dated to 2.69 ± 0.03 Ma to the younger nearby undated Greenpark and Pukunui rhyolite domes.

The Otawa stratovolcano erupted first as long ago as 2.95 million years ago south of Tauranga. It has hornblende and pyroxene basaltic andesite to dacite lavas and breccias with a present area of 35 km^{2} (14 sq mi). The most northern Bowentown dome is assigned to the Centre tentatively which has the advantage of a possible separation of about 2 million years in known activity of the Coromandel Volcanic Zone to its north from that of the Tauranga Volcanic Centre. Minden Peak may have erupted most recently of all the volcanoes in the Centre.

=== Relations to other volcanic activity ===
At the same approximate time the Centre was active to its west in Zealandia the Alexandra Volcanic Group was active.

Assigned eruptions for the Tauranga Volcanic Centre
Formations	Deposit/Volcano names	Age range estimate by various methods/samples (if only one method ± error)	Notes (including location)
Minden Rhyolite Subgroup	Minden Peak	1.53 to 2.16 Ma	37°42′47″S 176°02′41″E
Papamoa Formation	Papamoa ignimbrites: Welcome Bay, Wharo, Arateka, Otawera	1.9 to 2.40 Ma	37°43′S 176°17′E Ignimbrite classification, Ongatiti ignibrite in the formation is from the Mangakino Caldera
Minden Rhyolite Subgroup	Otanewainuku	1.95 ± 0.02 Ma	37°52′S 176°14′E
Waiteariki Formation	Waiteariki ignimbrite	2.09 to 2.25 Ma	DRE = 870 ± 87 km^{3} (209 ± 21 cu mi) from postulated Omanawa Caldera.
Minden Rhyolite Subgroup	Puwhenua	2.14 ± 0.05 Ma	37°55′36″S 176°07′04″E
Minden Rhyolite Subgroup	Kaimai	2.20 to 2.86 Ma	37°51′37″S 175°55′31″E
Minden Rhyolite Subgroup	Waikite	2.25 to 2.37 Ma	37°45′16″S 176°12′38″E
Minden Rhyolite Subgroup	Papamoa	2.25 to 2.88 Ma	37°44′S 176°17′E
Minden Rhyolite Subgroup	Mangatawa	2.28 to 2.45 Ma	37°42′11″S 176°14′34″E
Minden Rhyolite Subgroup	Maunganui	2.35 ± 0.06 Ma	37°37′49″S 176°10′19″E
Minden Rhyolite Subgroup	Kaikaikaroro	2.39 ± 0.06 Ma	37°47′17″S 176°00′07″E
Minden Rhyolite Subgroup	Bowentown	2.51 to 2.83 Ma	37°27′54″S 175°59′20″E
Minden Rhyolite Subgroup	Kopukairua	2.53 to 2.69 Ma	37°44′S 176°14′E Has one earlier but inconsistent age
Minden Rhyolite Subgroup	Upuhue	2.53 to 2.84 Ma	37°42′44″S 176°15′35″E
Otawa Andesite Formation	Otawa stratovolcano	2.54 to 2.95 Ma	37°47′S 176°16′E
Minden Rhyolite Subgroup	Pukunui	2.21 - 2.54 Ma	37°46′42″S 176°12′16″E Age constrained to this range but undated
Minden Rhyolite Subgroup	Waitao	2.64 to 2.71 Ma	37°44′32″S 176°13′21″E
Minden Rhyolite Subgroup	Greenpark	2.21 - 2.69 Ma	37°49′22″S 176°12′05″E Age constrained to this range but undated
Minden Rhyolite Subgroup	Maungatūtū/Mount Misery	2.69 ± 0.03 Ma	37°48′24″S 176°11′20″E
Matakana Formation	Matakana Island Basalt	2.7 ± 0.1 Ma	37°36′07″S 176°02′35″E
Minden Rhyolite Subgroup	Kakahu	2.87 ± 0.02 Ma	37°57′47″S 175°56′15″E Technically the vent is in the Waikato region

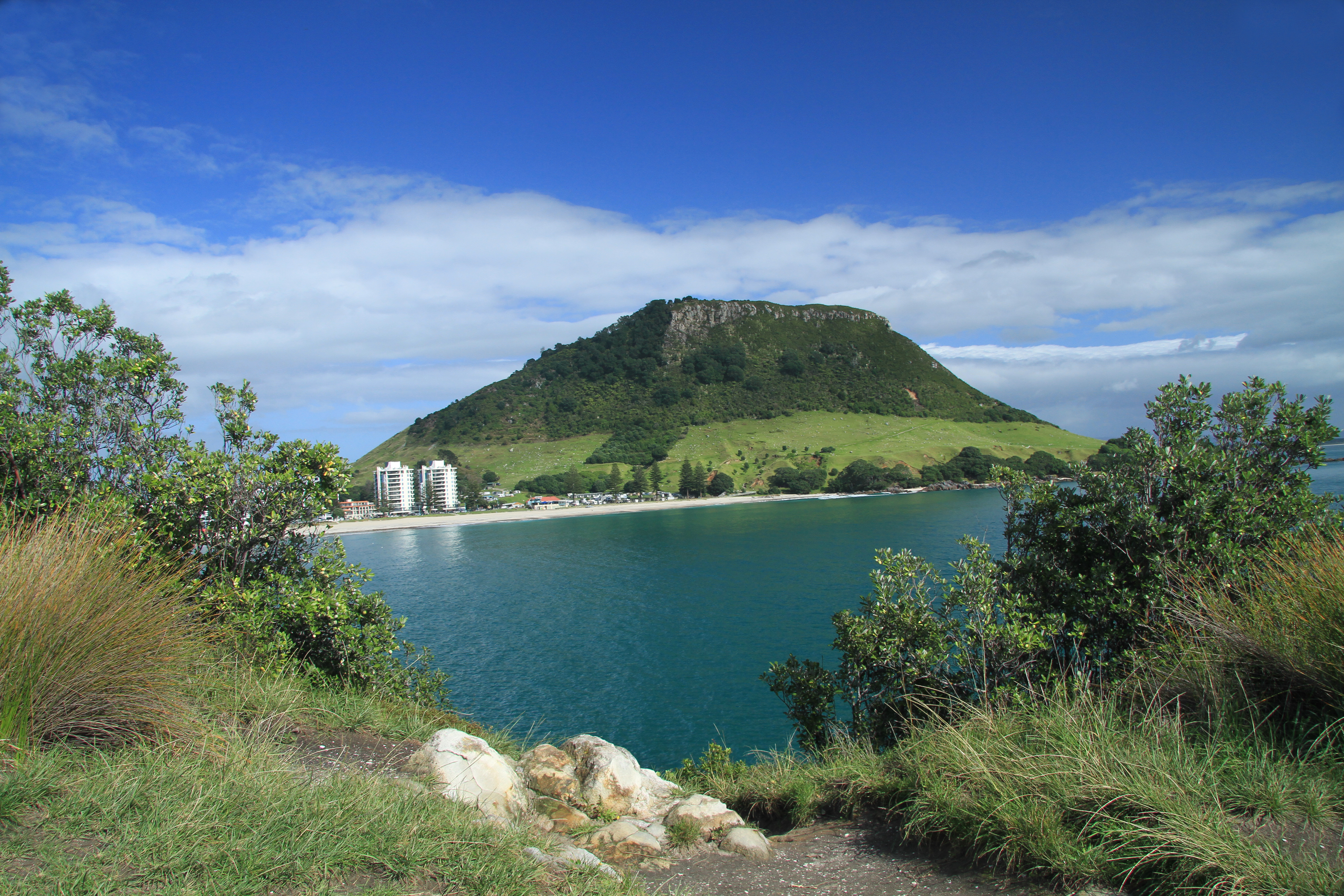
Mount Maunganui from Moturiki Island

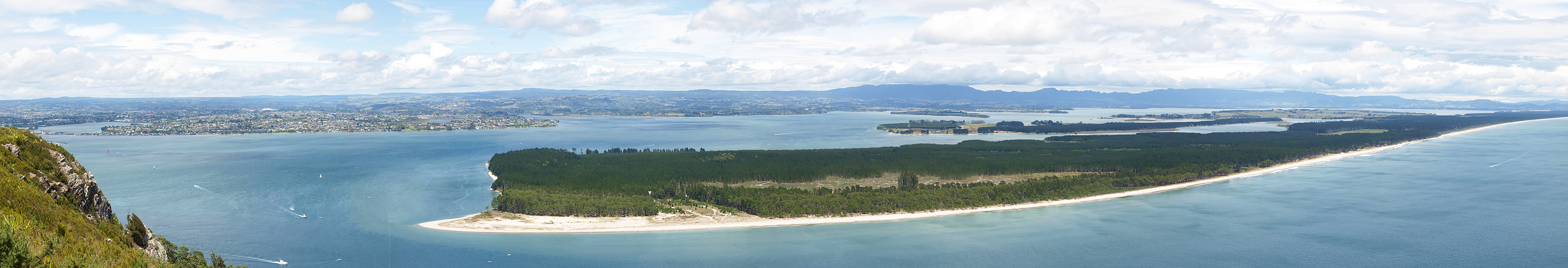
Matakana Island in foreground and Kaimai Range in background (view towards the west)

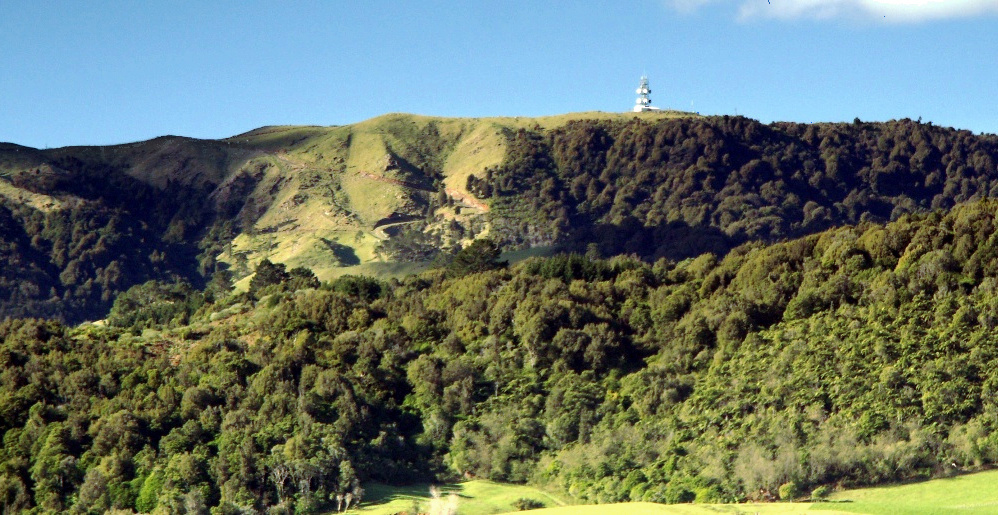
At this location of the Kaimai Range the communication centre is close to the rhyolite Te Weraiti vent.

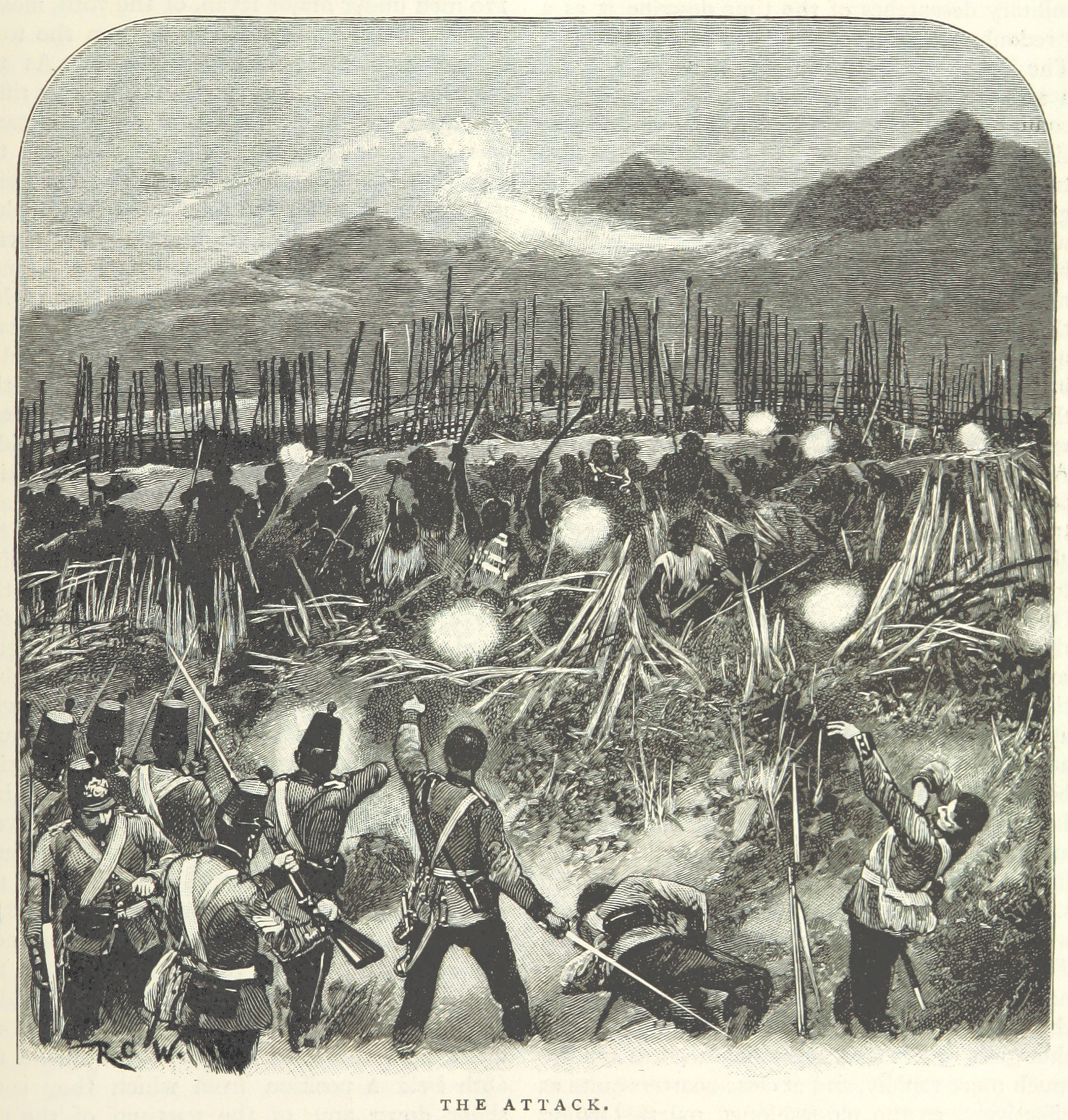
Volcanoes of the Tauranga Volcanic Centre provide the backdrop for the Gate Pā battle of the Tauranga campaign.

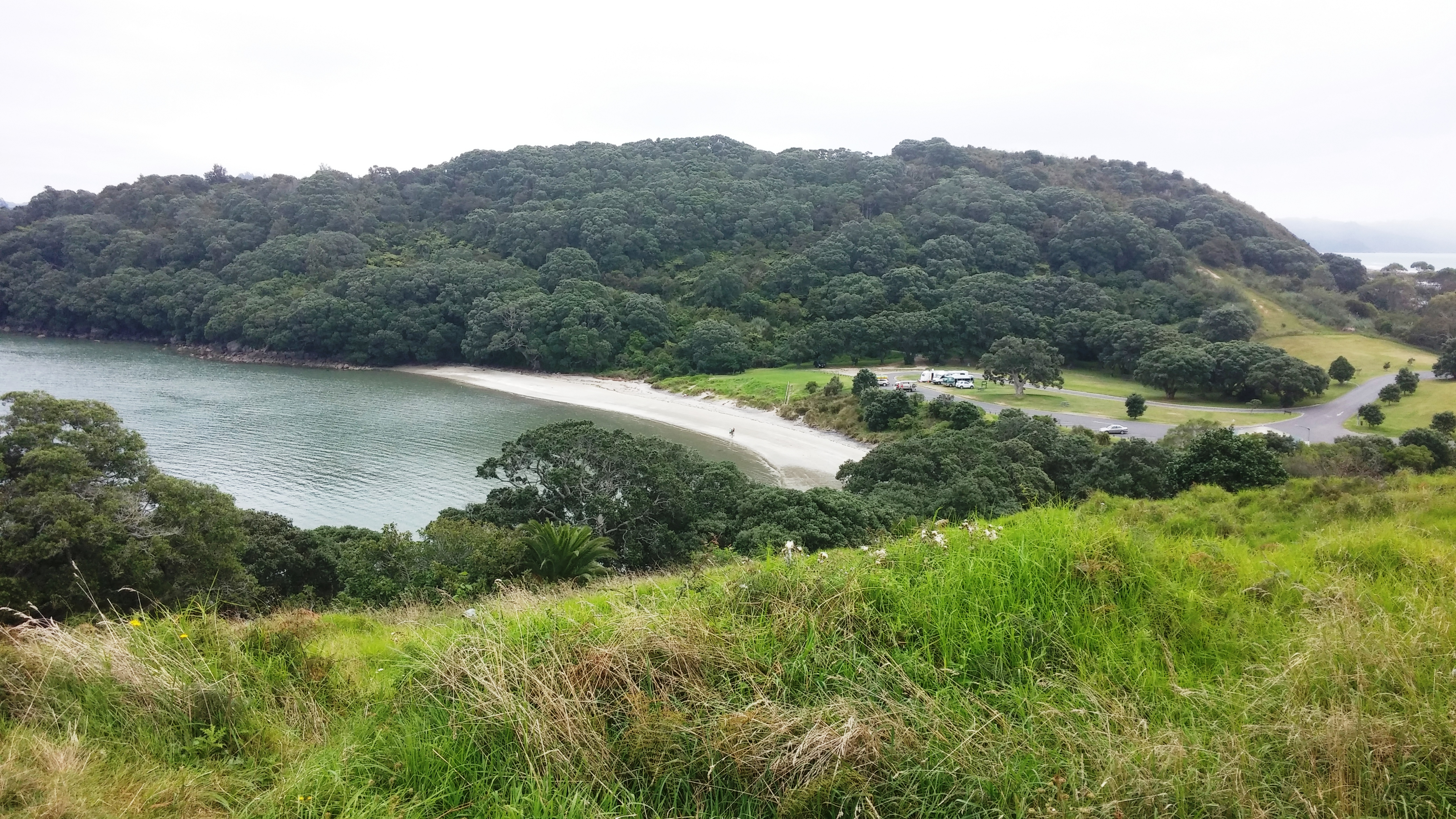
Bowentown volcanic formations above the beach

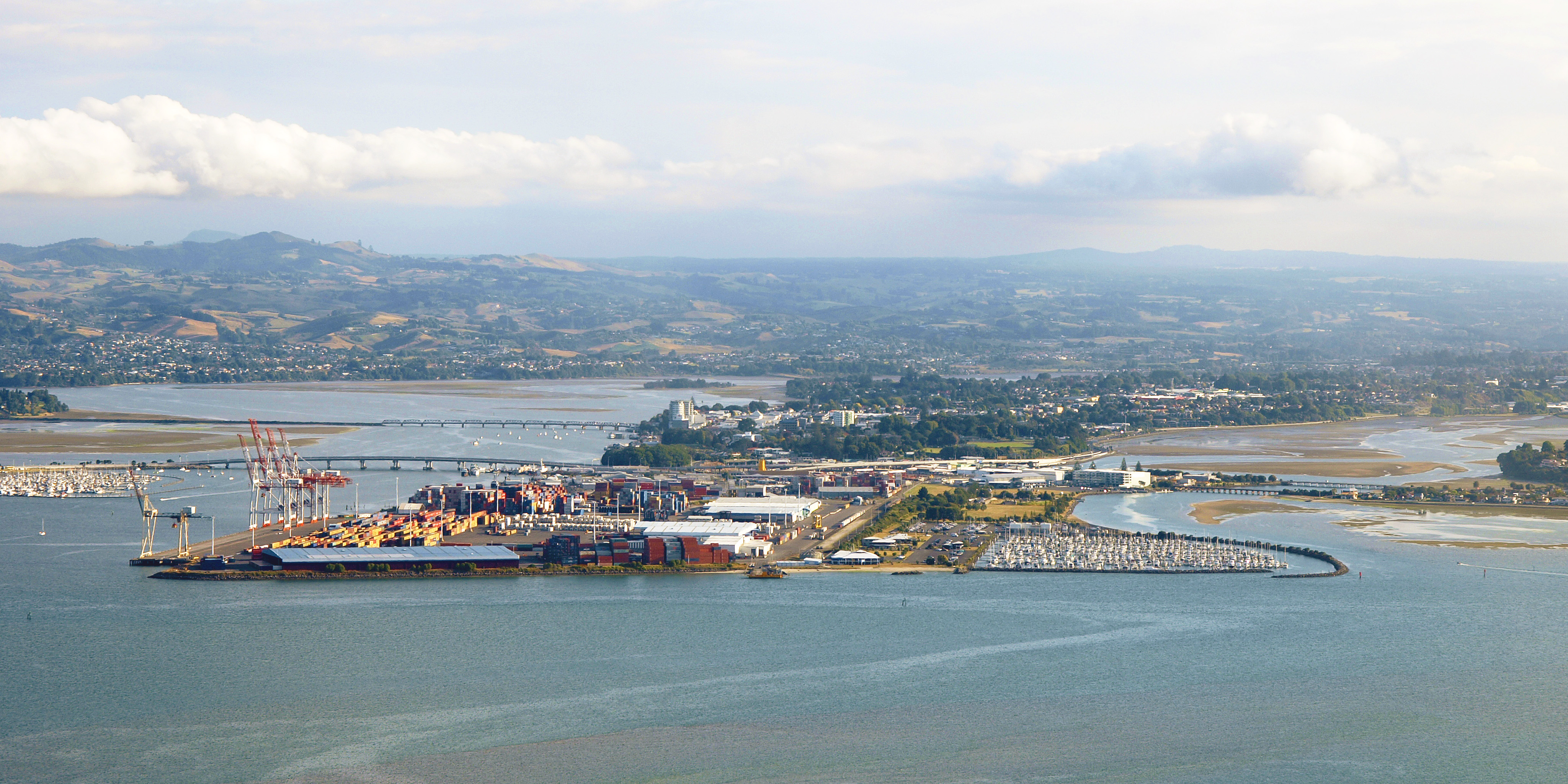
Essentially all the land except the foreshore in this view of Tauranga is volcanic and most is contributed to by the Tauranga Volcanic Centre with its high hills at either side except at centre where Mamaku ignimbrite from the Rotorua Caldera has flowed from the horizon down to the waters edge.

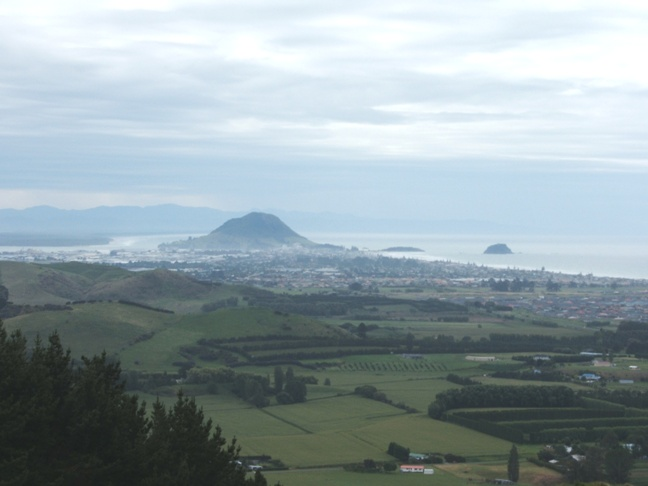
The view from the Papamoa Hills towards Mount Maunganui taking in the Papamoa ignimbrite formations and that includes the Upuhue and Mangatawa vents.
