= Coromandel Volcanic Zone =

Extinct volcanic area in New Zealand

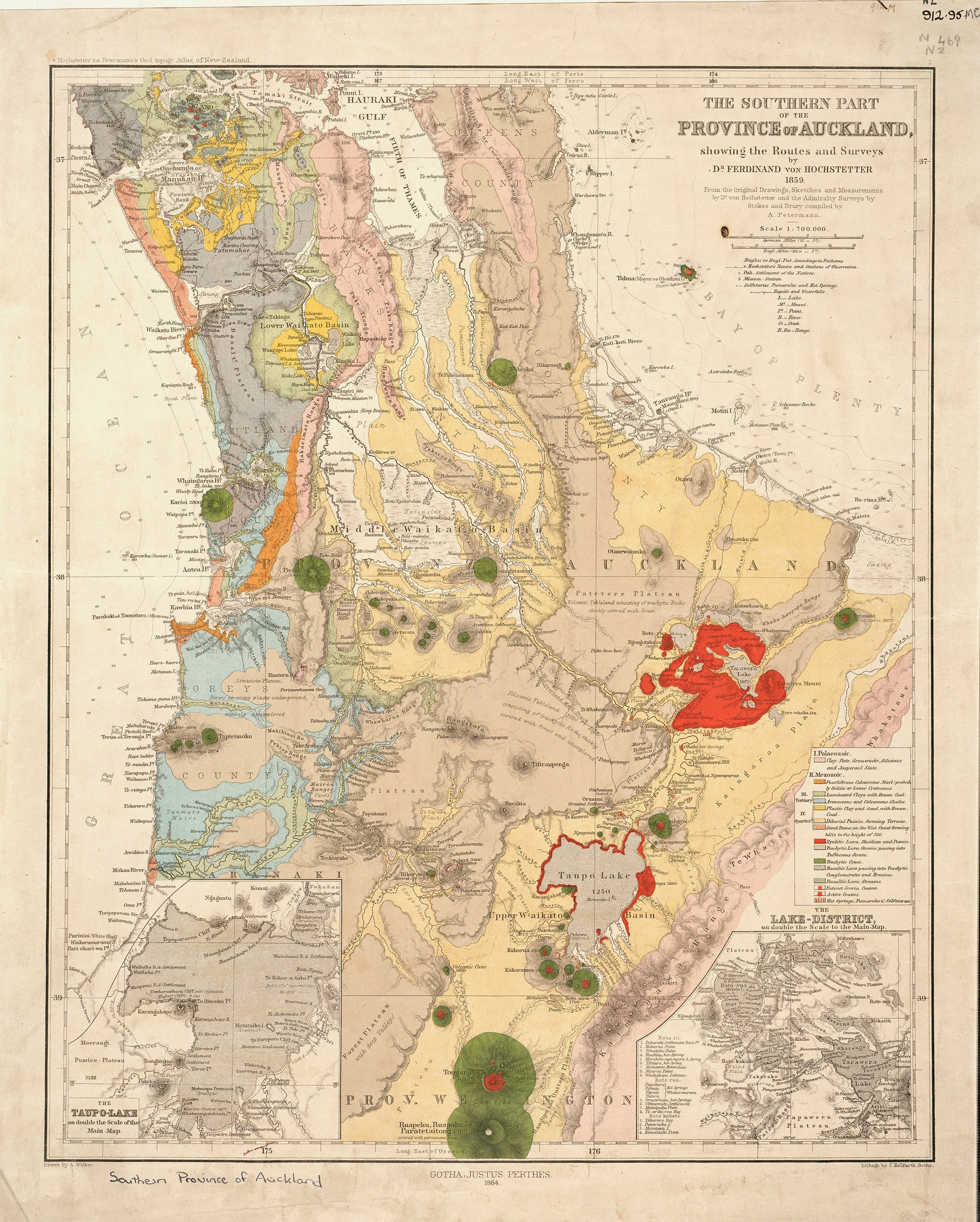
- Hochstetter 1859 geological map of the southern part of the then Auckland Province that recognised the Coromandel volcanics of this part of the North Island.

Highest point
- Elevation: 953 m (3,127 ft)
- Coordinates: 37.16°S 175.64°E

Geography
- Map centred upon the Coromandel Volcanic Zone. Legend: Key for the volcanics that are shown with panning is: basalt (shades of brown/orange); monogenetic basalts; undifferentiated basalts of the Tangihua Complex in Northland Allochthon; arc basalts; arc ring basalts; dacite; andesite (shades of red); basaltic andesite; rhyolite (ignimbrite is lighter shades of violet); plutonic; White shading is selected caldera features.; Clicking on the rectangle icon enables full window and mouse-over with volcano name/wikilink and ages before present.

Geology
- Rock age(s): Miocene and Pliocene 18–4 Ma
- Mountain type: Volcanic area
- Rock type(s): Andesite and Rhyolite
- Volcanic arc: Coromandel Volcanic Zone
- Last eruption: c. 2.5 million years ago (subsequent evidence closer to 4 million years ago)

The Coromandel Volcanic Zone (CVZ) is an extinct intraplate volcanic arc stretching from Great Barrier Island in the north, through the Coromandel Peninsula, to the Kaimai Range in the south. The area of transition between it and the newer and still active Taupō Volcanic Zone is now usually separated and is called the Tauranga Volcanic Centre. Its volcanic activity was associated with the formation and most active period of the Hauraki Rift.

== Geology ==
=== Tectonics ===
The Coromandel Volcanic Zone is generally older than the currently still active Hauraki and Taupō Rifts. This has implications as the widening of the Hauraki Rift was most about 5.5 million years ago, so the Kiwitahi volcanics (called by some the Kiwitahi Volcanic Zone), which occur west of the Coromandel Peninsula and the Hauraki Rift are probably best regarded as related to the Coromandel Volcanic Zone. For example, some of the volcanics are broadly contemporaneous in age, composition and orientation north south, with eruptions at 16 million years ago at Stony Batter, Waiheke Island, however Stony Batter has been active much more recently. Thus the tectonic processes involved in the formation of the Hauraki Rift and Coromandel Volcanic Zone in the continent of Zealandia have moved from the north to the south over the last 20 million years. The Coromandel Volcanic Zone includes back arc volcanoes that are related to historic but distinct fault structures such as the Hauraki Fault, which is along the eastern side of the zone. The undersea western side of the Coromandel Volcanic Zone has a parallel structure to the Hauraki basin and plains also of late Miocene/Quaternary origin extending north, that has been called the East Coromandel Rift. The formation of the Taupō Rift and the old Taupō Volcanic Zone about 2 million years ago terminated significant activity in the Coromandel Volcanic Zone. However it is important to recognise that the Tauranga Volcanic Centre and its postulated Omanawa Caldera at the intersection of the two rifts, have likely relationships to the location of the more recent north eastern caldera's of the Taupō Volcanic Zone. These eruptions will have buried on land any older volcanics that were related to the southern end of the Coromandel Volcanic Zone. Offshore tephra deposits suggest the start of a composition change, at 4.5 million years ago, about the time the Waihi Caldera was active, and well before the end of Coromandel Volcanic Zone activity if this was at Bowentown.

=== Volcanism ===
Activity began in the north around 18 million years ago, and was primarily andesitic in an intraplate volcanic arc until around 9–10 million years ago. The oldest volcanic rocks at the northern tip of the Coromandel Peninsula are the Port Charles andesites that are dated from about 18 million years ago. With time, the volcanism tended to move southwards at 8 mm (0.31 in)/year and eastwards at 3 mm (0.12 in)/year. After this stage it is postulated that the Kapowai Caldera, the largest in the zone, located in the centre of the Coromandel Range (peaks of Table mountain, The Pinnacles, Tanehua) formed. This is part of a rhyolitic transition that can be seen from Whitianga to Whangamatā on the western side of the zone but it is notable that some of the eastern Whitianga rhyolites are younger than some further south. In the period 9 to 7 million years ago a bimodal basalt to basaltic andesite/rhyolite association developed with major caldera collapse, ignimbrite eruptions, and then post-caldera andesite eruption. This included the Wharepapa Ignimbrite event from the Kapowai Caldera about 8 million years ago. To the south of the large Kapowai Caldera some have located the smaller Wharekawa Caldera. The Tunaiti Caldera, immediately south of Whangamatā is believed to be about 7 million years old and has pre-caldera andesites and dacites, and later dacites and rhyolite domes and flows. Then between 6 and 5.5 million years ago bimodal eruptions of basalt to basaltic andesite as well as rhyolite and rhyolitic ignimbrite began once more. This formed the volcanic structures around Waihi later important in precious metal discoveries due to subsequent hydrothermal mineral deposit formation. As activity decreased between 4.7 and 4.2 million years ago it became entirely basaltic with the volcanics of the eastern Mercury Islands being typical before the transitioned into early activity in the Taupō Volcanic Zone.

Some of the later activity in the Coromandel Volcanic Zone and its interface with the Taupō Volcanic Zone is obscured by subsequent large scale events. It was suspected to have continued in the south to at least 2.5 million years ago with the Bowentown rhyolites south of Waihi Beach marking the transition to the Tauranga Volcanic Centre geographically. However compositional analysis suggests Bowentown rhyolites have much in common with the Minden rhyolites of the Tauranga Volcanic Centre so may belong with this centre.

The extinct undersea Colville Ridge, which has been dated to 5.4 million years before present is part of the Coromandel Volcanic Zone and can be associated with the modern Taupō Volcanic Zone and Kermadec Ridge. Geothermal activity is still present in the Zone, with hot springs in several places, including at Hot Water Beach, on the central east coast between Whitianga and Tairua and on the south western margins of the Zone near Te Aroha where there is only natural soda water geyser in the world. There are mineral deposits such as gold in quartz reefs associated with past geothermal and volcanic processes.

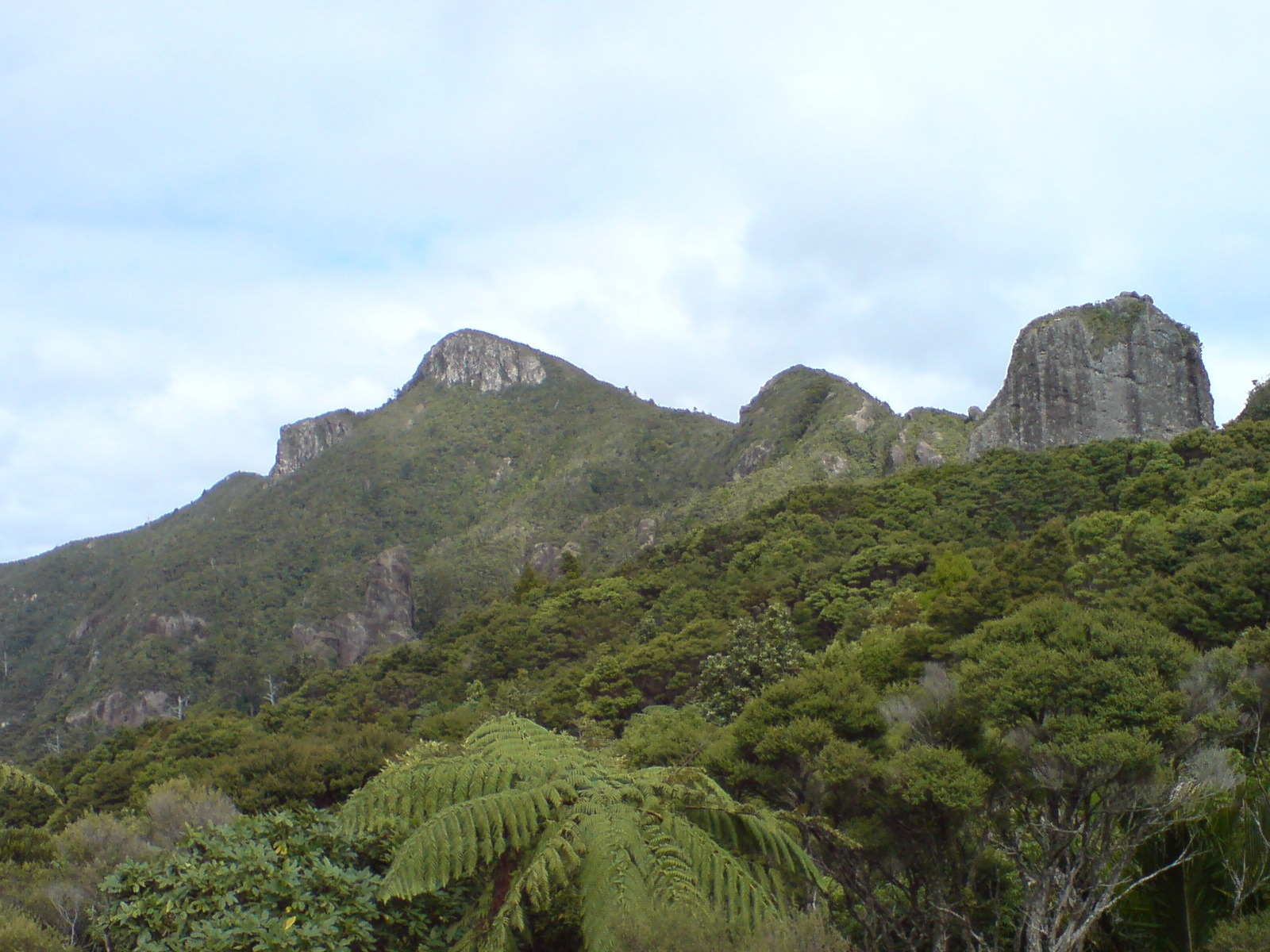
Mount Hobson, Great Barrier Island in the Coromandel Volcanic Zone

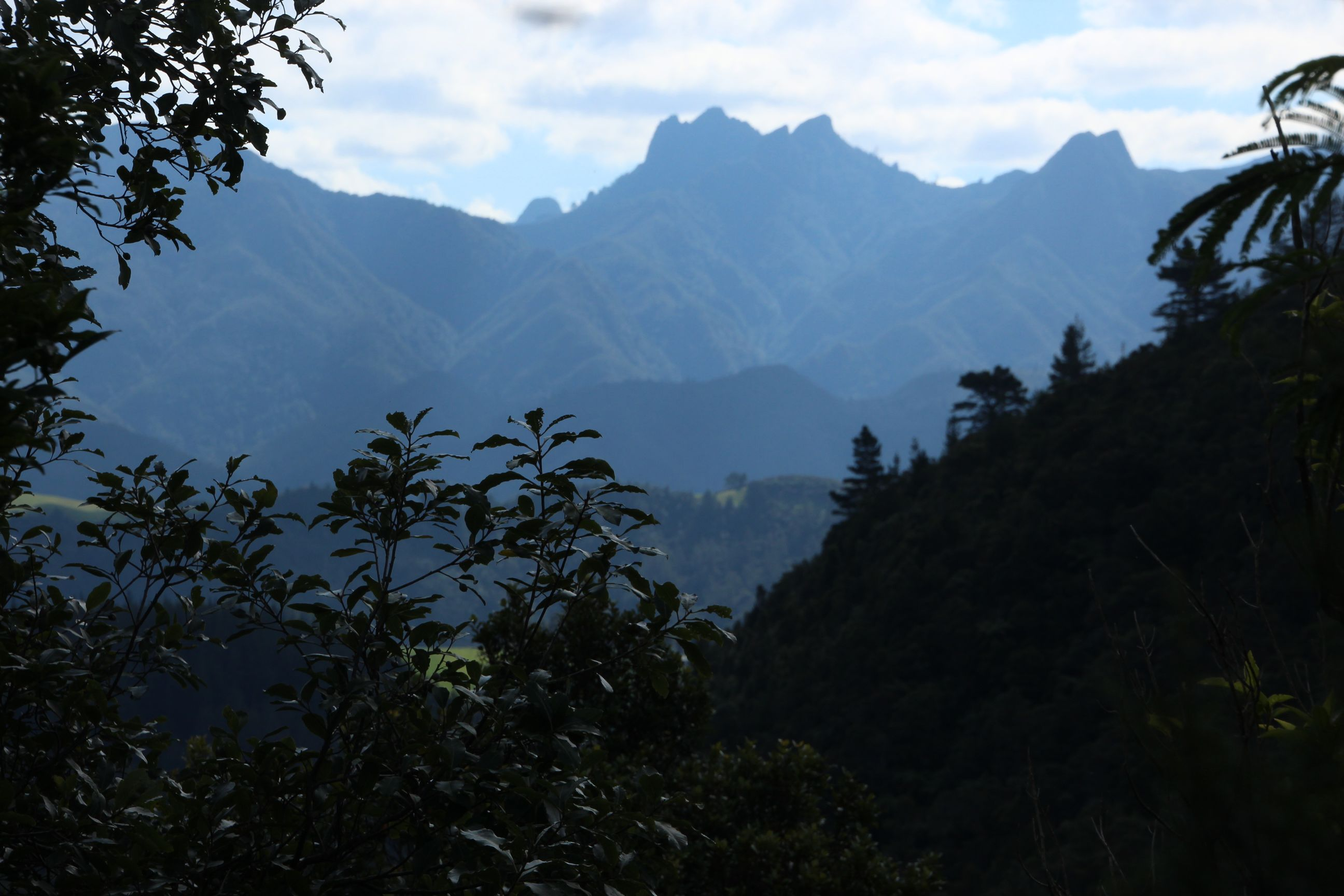
Typical example of the rugged forested nature of the Coromandel Range in the Coromandel Volcanic Zone

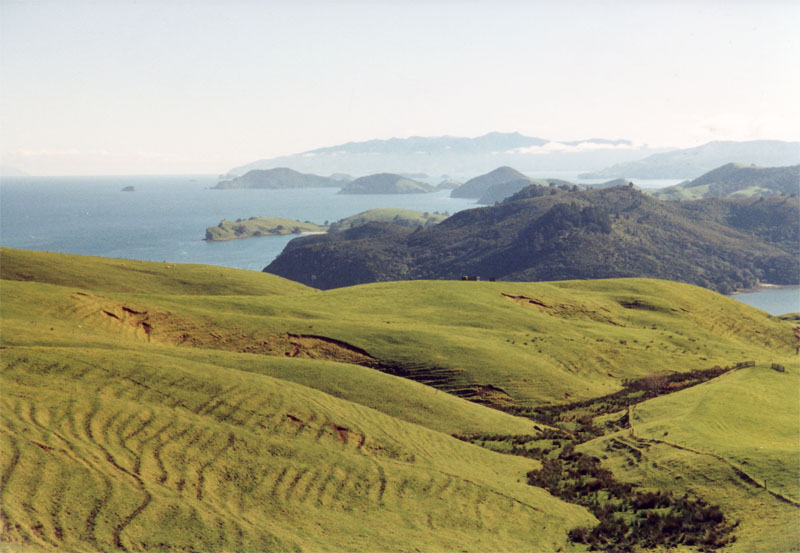
Northern Coromandel Peninsula landscape in the Coromandel Volcanic Zone

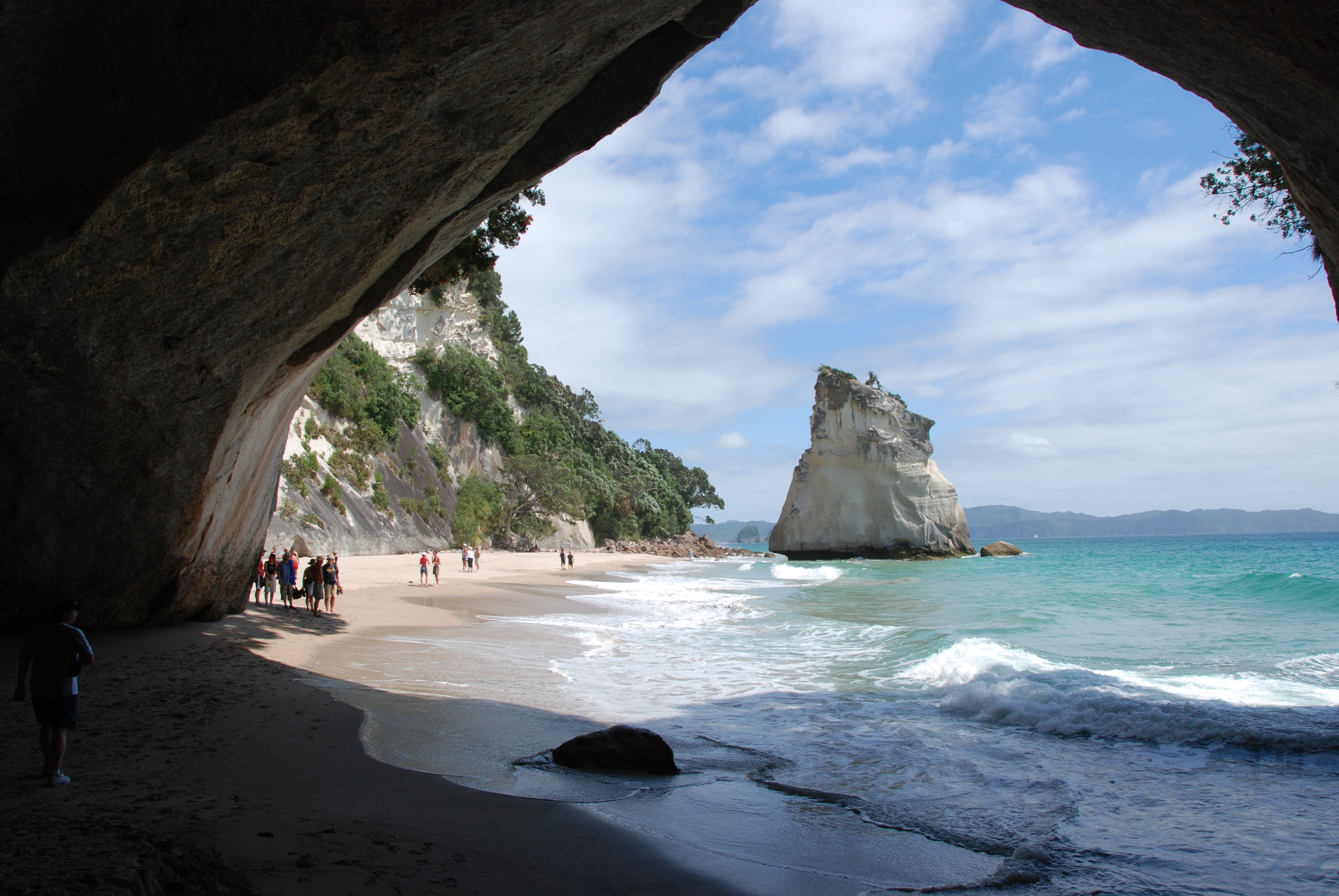
Sea arch at Cathedral Cove, carved in tuff deposited by a pyroclastic flow about 8 million years ago

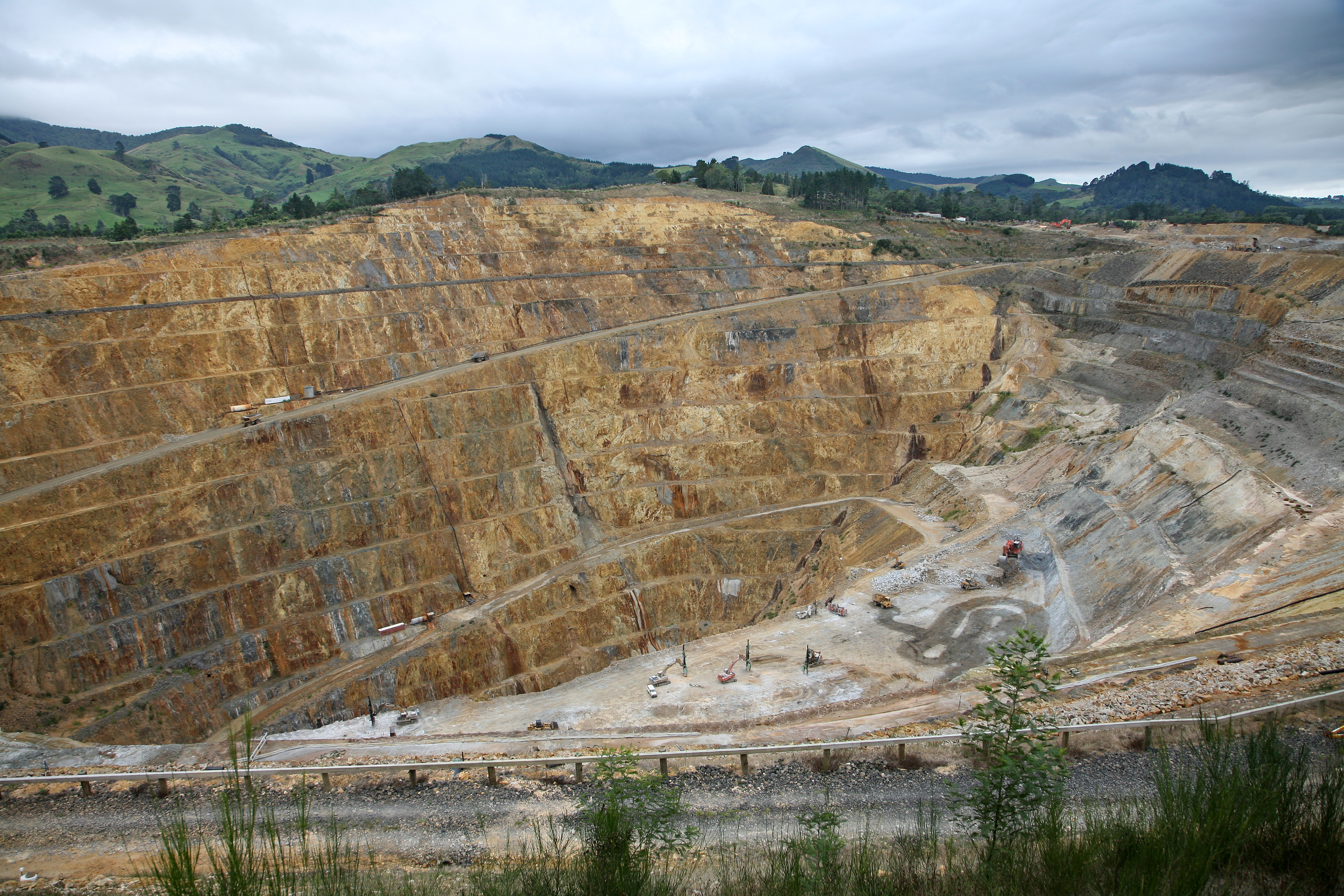
The Martha Mine is a large Gold and Silver mine in the middle of the Coromandel Volcanic Zone

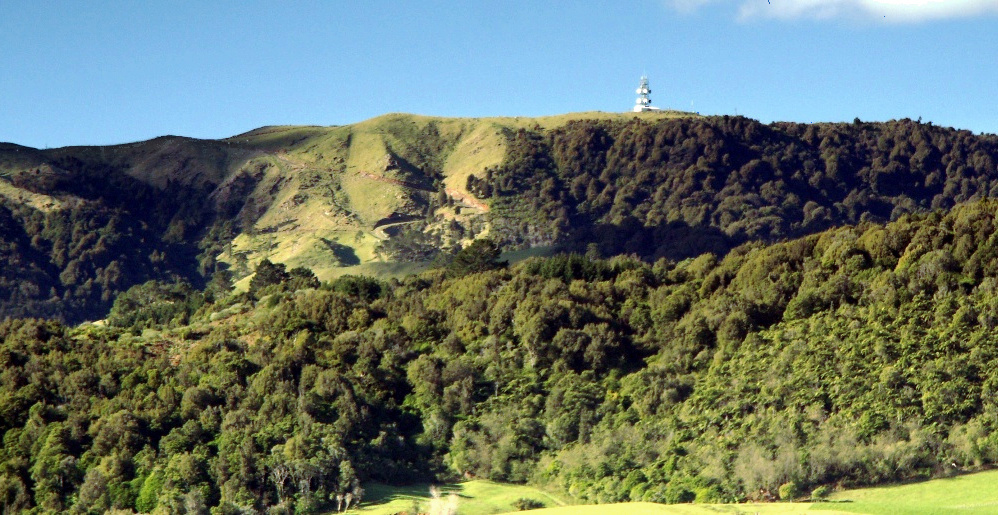
Kaimai Range with communications towers

== See also ==
- Geology of the Auckland Region
- Geology of the Waikato-King Country Region
- List of volcanoes in New Zealand
- Volcanism of New Zealand
- Stratigraphy of New Zealand
