= Whakamaru Caldera =

Large volcanic caldera in New Zealand

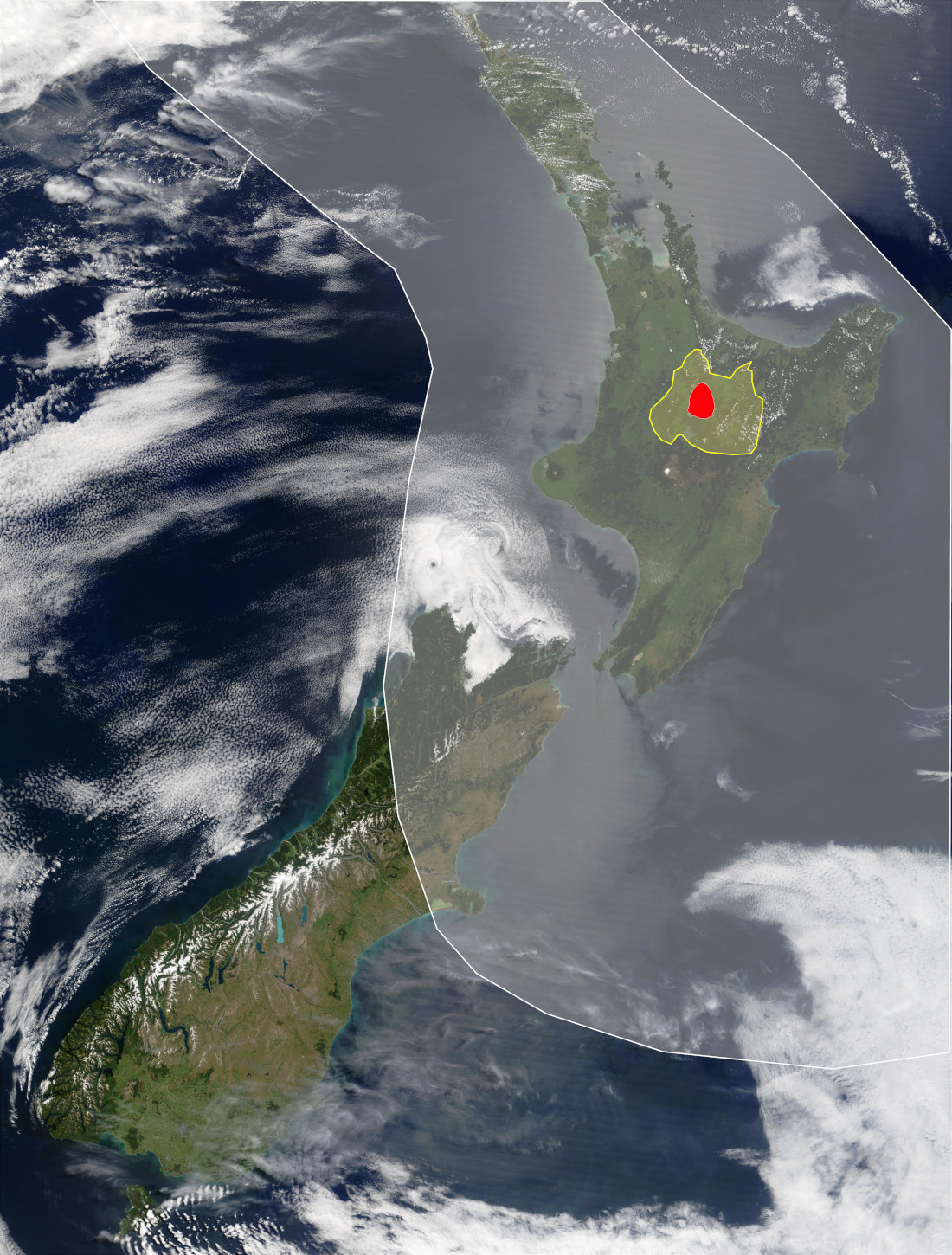
- The approximate immediate impact of the Whakamaru Caldera (red shading) eruptions of about 335,000 years before present. Light white shading shows where 10cm or more tephra detected noting that for example 25cm tephra is found against prevailing wind patterns well to north west of present New Zealand and 10cm south east of Banks Peninsula suggesting multiple significant events contributed. Similarly the light yellow shading does not consider all discontinuities but rather assumes that most discontinuities are due to subsequent erosion rather than landforms of this long ago, which is likely incorrect, but from immediate biosphere impact likely not significantly so. It is possible that ultimately there was worldwide biosphere impact.

Highest point
- Elevation: 744 m (2,441 ft)
- Coordinates: 38.42°S 175.80°E

Dimensions
- Width: 40 kilometres (25 mi)

Geography
- Location within New Zealand Location within North Island
- Location: North Island, New Zealand

Geology
- Rock age: Quaternary (0.34–0.014 Ma)
- Mountain type: Caldera
- Volcanic zone: Taupō Volcanic Zone
- Last eruption: Hydrothermal eruptions are contemporary, last volcanic 14,000 years ago (Puketarata)

Whakamaru Caldera was created in a massive supereruption 335,000 years ago and is approximately 30 by 40 km (19 by 25 mi) in size and is located in the North Island of New Zealand. It now contains active geothermal areas as well as the later Maroa Caldera.

== Geography ==
The Whakamaru Caldera covers an area larger than the younger Taupō Volcano to its south and indeed the rims overlap. To its north the more recent eruptive centres have sometimes been grouped as the Mokai Ring Complex or Maroa Volcanic Centre. It contains to its north east the more recently active Maroa Caldera with the Ben Lomond Dome being outside the southern border of the Maroa Caldera but definitely a feature of the Whakamaru Caldera. Domes within the caldera include the Western Dome Complex, including Pokuru which defines its north western borders (which likely overlap with those of the older Mangakino caldera complex), Forest Road Dome, Puketarata (near Te Pouwhakatutu, which is the last Maroa Caldera eruption, now known to be 11,300 ± 1,700 years ago), Ngangiho, which is 629 metres (2,064 ft) high but beaten by Ben Lomond 744 metres (2,441 ft), and Marotiri 733 metres (2,405 ft) just to the west of Kinloch.

== Geology ==
The first eruptions may have occurred half a million years ago, but the period 320,000 to 340,000 years before the present have been characterised as:

1. Whakamaru eruption
  - Massive eruption sequence over less than a thousand years with a VEI of 8 producing 1,200 to 2,000 km^{3} (287.9 to 479.8 cu mi) of tephra about 335,000 years ago (330 - 340 ka). This age in the most recent literature has slightly moved back to 340 ± 5 ka. This is the largest known in the Taupō Volcanic Zone and had at least three rhyolytic and one basaltic eruption in its sequence.
  - Although accumulation of the magma mush may have been over more than 200,000 years there is increasing evidence that eruption only became possible over a period that may have been as short as 10 years through a rapid thermal pulse or pressure change.
  - From sea core sediment studies it is known that it deposited the widespread Mount Curl/Rangitawa Tephra, dominantly to the southeast (in addition to occurrences northwest), extending across the landmass of New Zealand, and the South Pacific Ocean and Tasman Sea. The eruption has been calculated to have been 1,500 km^{3} (360 cu mi) dense-rock equivalent (DRE) and modelled to have produced a Plinian column approximately 45 km (28 mi) high. At the Chatham Islands which is more than 900 kilometres (560 mi) from the Whakamaru Caldera the deposits are up to 30 cm (12 in) thick. About 200 kilometres (120 mi) from the source in New Zealand itself the Rangitawa Tephra is up to 70 cm (28 in) thick so a large area of the planet's biosphere would have been impacted.
  - Whakamaru ignimbrite
    - Found over an area of 13,000 km^{2} (5,000 sq mi) mainly to west of caldera
    - Up to 1 km (0.62 mi) thick
  - Rangataiki ignimbrite
    - Found mainly to east of caldera
2. Mananui eruption (also termed Whakamaru 2 eruption about 330,000 to 320,000 years ago
  - Mananui ignimbrite found mainly to west of caldera
  - Te Whaiti ignimbrite found mainly to east of caldera and likely to be same eruptive sequence as Mananui
3. Paeroa eruption by 320,000 years ago on datings above
  - Paeroa ignimbrite is found mainly to east of caldera, and is exposed by the Paeroa Fault. It has been redated to 339 ± 5 ka and assigned to a linear vent zone to the east of the caldera, which could make the Whakamaru ignimbrite older by about 20,000 years and could dissociate this eruption from the Whakamaru Caldera. The total amount of ignimbrite erupted was about 110 km^{3} (26 cu mi). As it may have been associated with residual magma from the Whakamaru event it can remain classified with the Whakamaru Caldera for the purposes of this article.
4. The Western Dome Belt eruptions
  - These represent separate younger magmas that were emplaced over an extended period, from 340,000 to 240,000 years ago

The Maroa Caldera eruptions can be regarded as a separate sequence of rholite eruptions commencing from 305,000 years ago continuing to as recently as 14,000 years ago:

- 305,000 ± 17,000 years ago oldest Maroa dome
- 283,000 ± 11,000 years ago Korotai deposits from northern Maroa
- 275,000 to 240,000 years ago small-scale pyroclastic eruptions
- 272,000 ± 10,000 years ago Putauaki pyroclastics from a central Maroa source
- 256,000 ± 12,000 years ago Orakonui pyroclastics from a central Maroa source
- 251,000 ± 17,000 years ago onward two large parallel dome complexes developed
- 229,000 ± 12,000 years ago Atiamuri deposits from northern Maroa
- 220,000 unclear where Mokai ignimbrite that outcrop in some of Maroa area comes from
- 229,000 to 196,000 years ago Pukeahua deposits and dome building
- 11,300 ± 1,700 years ago Puketarata tuff ring formed with total volume of 0.25 km^{3} (0.060 cu mi) in a complex series of eruptions including maar formation

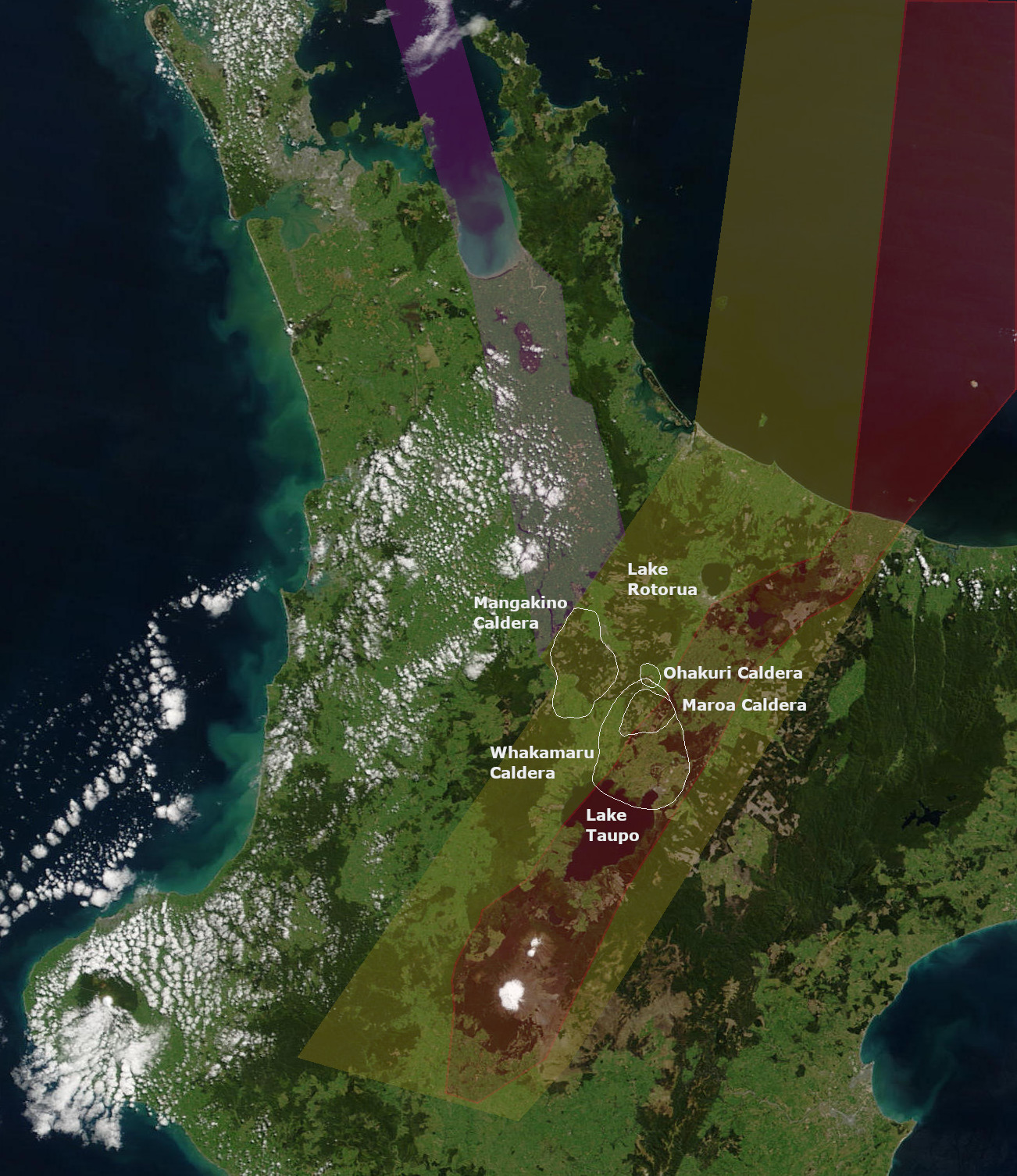
Whakamaru Caldera approximate location and boundaries north of Lake Taupō. The more recent Maroa Caldera is contained within it and the Ohakuri Caldera which had a paired eruption with the Rotorua Caldera is to its north. To its west is the oldest Mangakino Caldera and indeed the area on the map showing separation may not be the case as these are old volcanoes of the old Taupō Rift (yellow shading). Also shown is the modern Taupō Rift (red shading), Hauraki Rift (purple shading) and landmarks of Lake Taupō and Lake Rotorua.

Map of selected surface volcanic deposits centered on postulated Whakamaru Caldera (light green shading). The present surface ignimbrites are various light violet shades which are identical for any single source, but other eruptions breakup the ignimbrite sheets. Legend: Key for the volcanics that are shown with panning is: basalt (shades of brown/orange); monogenetic basalts; undifferentiated basalts of the Tangihua Complex in Northland Allochthon; arc basalts; arc ring basalts; dacite; andesite (shades of red); basaltic andesite; rhyolite (ignimbrite is lighter shades of violet); plutonic; White shading is selected caldera features.; Clicking on the rectangle icon enables full window and mouse-over with volcano name/wikilink and ages before present.
