= Omanawa Caldera =

Volcanic caldera in New Zealand

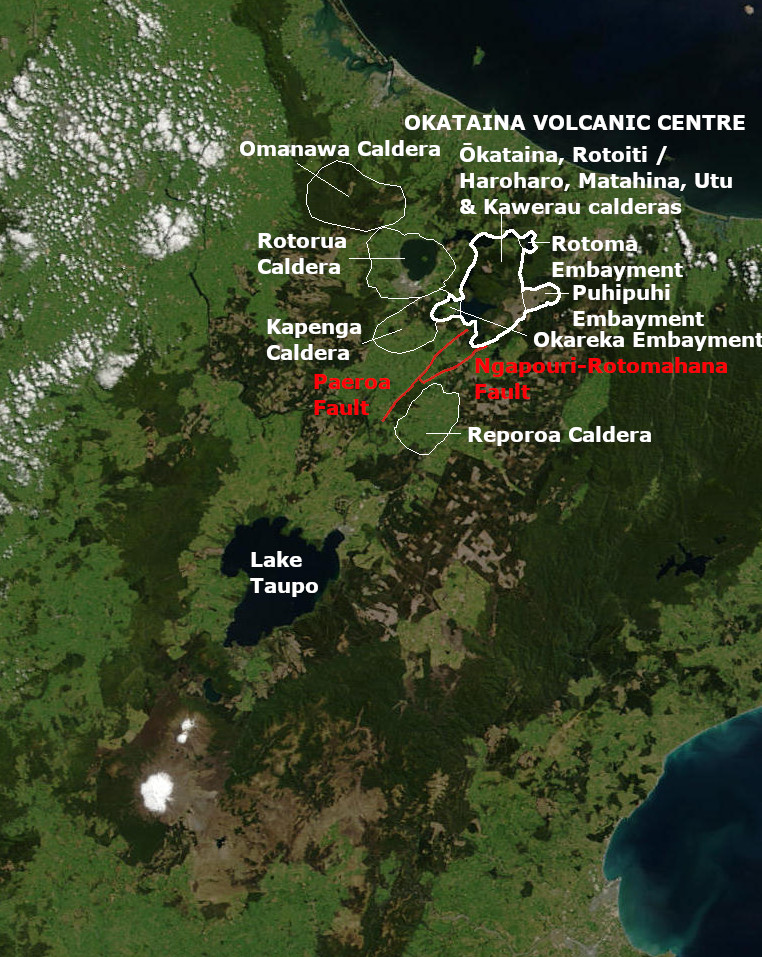
- The approximate size and position of the largely buried (in ignimbrites from the modern Taupō Volcanic Zone) Omanawa Caldera relative to other nearby features of the Taupō Volcanic Zone

Highest point
- Coordinates: 37°56′29″S 176°02′38″E

Geography
- Location within North Island
- Location: North Island, New Zealand

Geology
- Rock age: between 2.4 to 1.9 million years
- Mountain type: Caldera
- Volcanic zone: Taupō Volcanic Zone

The Omanawa Caldera is inferred by an area of magnetic anomaly that exists to the north-west of the Rotorua Caldera. It is located to the north west of the present boundary of the modern Taupō Volcanic Zone and its existence would be compatible with activity in the area of intersection of Taupō Rift and Hauraki Rift before this, about 1.9 million years ago. The area of the caldera is now mainly covered by Mamaku ignimbrite from the Mamaku eruption of 240,000 years ago that formed the Rotorua Caldera, but there are four earlier major ignimbrite eruptions of the Taupō Volcanic Zone that would have also contributed to its infilling.

== Possible Eruptions ==
Eruptions from the Omanawa Caldera could explain formations such as the Waiteariki ignimbrite which covers much of the Bay of Plenty and forms the bulk of the Whakamarama Plateau. If this eruption came from the caldera, it would date the major caldera formation to 2.1 million years ago. This large single eruption event had a DRE of 870 ± 87 km^{3} (209 ± 21 cu mi). However, there are at least eight large eruptions that occurred in the Tauranga Volcanic Centre between 2.4 and 1.9 million years ago and at this time which ones relate to this caldera can not be definite. If any involved the caldera, as they had smaller eruptive volumes than the Waiteariki eruption, the caldera structures that resulted from each of these eruptions would be smaller and might be spread out in area. To date there is no other obvious closer inferred volcanic structure to assign such a super volcanic eruption to, so at least some of these eruptions are likely to be associated with the Omanawa Caldera magnetic anomaly.

== Possible tectonic relationships ==
Map of Omanawa Caldera (violet outline) in relation to selected surface volcanic features of the Tauranga Volcanic Centre. (see other map on this page for other volcanic relationships). Brown shows the Waiteariki Ignimbrite. If you click on the map you will enable mouseover of volcano feature/wikilink. Characterised vents are black rectangles. Rhyolite fields from known vents is in red (geologically typed as Minden rhyolite) and andesite from the Otawa Formation is pink. Purple is Papamoa ignimbrites.

The Omanawa Caldera magnetic anomaly may be part of the transition structures of the Tauranga Volcanic Centre to the old Taupō Volcanic Zone and is sometimes mapped as the eastern most manifestation of the later. In this model the Omanawa Caldera can represent the first silicic system of the Taupō Volcanic Zone, rather than the last of the Tauranga Volcanic Centre. The Mangakino caldera complex which started forming 1,620,000 years ago, to the southwest, is part of the old Taupō Volcanic Zone and more recent than the postulated Omanawa Caldera so fits with modelling of Taupō Rift extension to the south west towards Hauhungatahi in the period 2,100,000 to 900,000 years ago.

In the Tauranga Volcanic Centre area a strongly negative Bouguer gravity anomaly exists between Katikati and Matakana Island in Tauranga Harbour which could also be a buried caldera structure related to Tauranga Volcanic Centre activity. There is no definite rhyolite dome relationship here and the geological structures observed to date in the southern Kaimai Ranges do not suggest a caldera underlies the southern Kaimai's, which have been suggested as another Tauranga Volcanic Centre caldera.
