= Andrew Forbes (runner) =

Scottish runner

Andy Forbes
Personal information
- Nationality: British (Scottish)
- Born: 9 October 1915
- Died: 1994 (aged 78–79)

Sport
- Sport: Athletics
- Event: middle/long-distance
- Club: Victoria Park AAC
Medal record
Men's athletics
Representing Scotland
British Empire Games
Silver medal – second place	1950 Auckland	6 miles

Andrew S. Forbes (9 October 1915 – 1994) was a middle to long-distance runner from Scotland who won a silver medal at the 1950 British Empire Games (now Commonwealth Games).

== Biography ==
Forbes began running with Victoria Park AAC in 1935. At the first Scottish National Championships held after World War II, Forbes won the 3 miles event at Lanark Racecourse. He represented Great Britain and won international honours every year from 1947 to 1951.

Forbes and fellow athlete Alan Paterson chose to travel by air instead of the usual ship journey to attend the 1950 British Empire Games in Auckland, New Zealand. Shortly before flying out, he won the Nigel Barge 5 mile road race in a new record time.

At the Empire Games he represented the Scottish team and won the silver medal behind New Zealander Harold Nelson in the 6 miles event. He also competed in the 1 mile and 3 miles competitions.

Forbes won a second national title in 1951 and continued running in to the 1970s at veteran level.
