= Eliza Anscombe =

English-born painter, emigrant to New Zealand

Eliza Stewart (née Anscombe; 1872 – 25 November 1934) was a New Zealand painter, born in Sussex, England. She was the elder sister of New Zealand architect Edmund Anscombe.

Her parents were carpenter Edmund Anscombe (1849–1928) and Eliza Anscombe (née Mason) (c. 1846–1921). The family migrated to New Zealand in 1874 on the Christian McAusland and settled initially in Rockyside (now Lookout Point) and later in Caversham, both now part of Dunedin.

Anscombe had two sisters (Agnes Emily Black and Edith Violet Brown) and three brothers (Edmund, Herbert, and Charles Ernest). She is described in Stone's Directory in 1892 and 1893 as a "teacher of drawing and painting". She moved to Clutha District later and was listed in the electoral roll as an artist living in Balclutha.

Anscombe married Gilbert Stewart in 1895 and had four children: Grace Ledingham Stewart in 1902, Winifred Pearl Mason Stewart in 1904, Alice Sophia Brazier Stewart in 1906 and Lloyd Campbell Stewart in 1907. She died at Warepa, near Balclutha, on 25 November 1934.

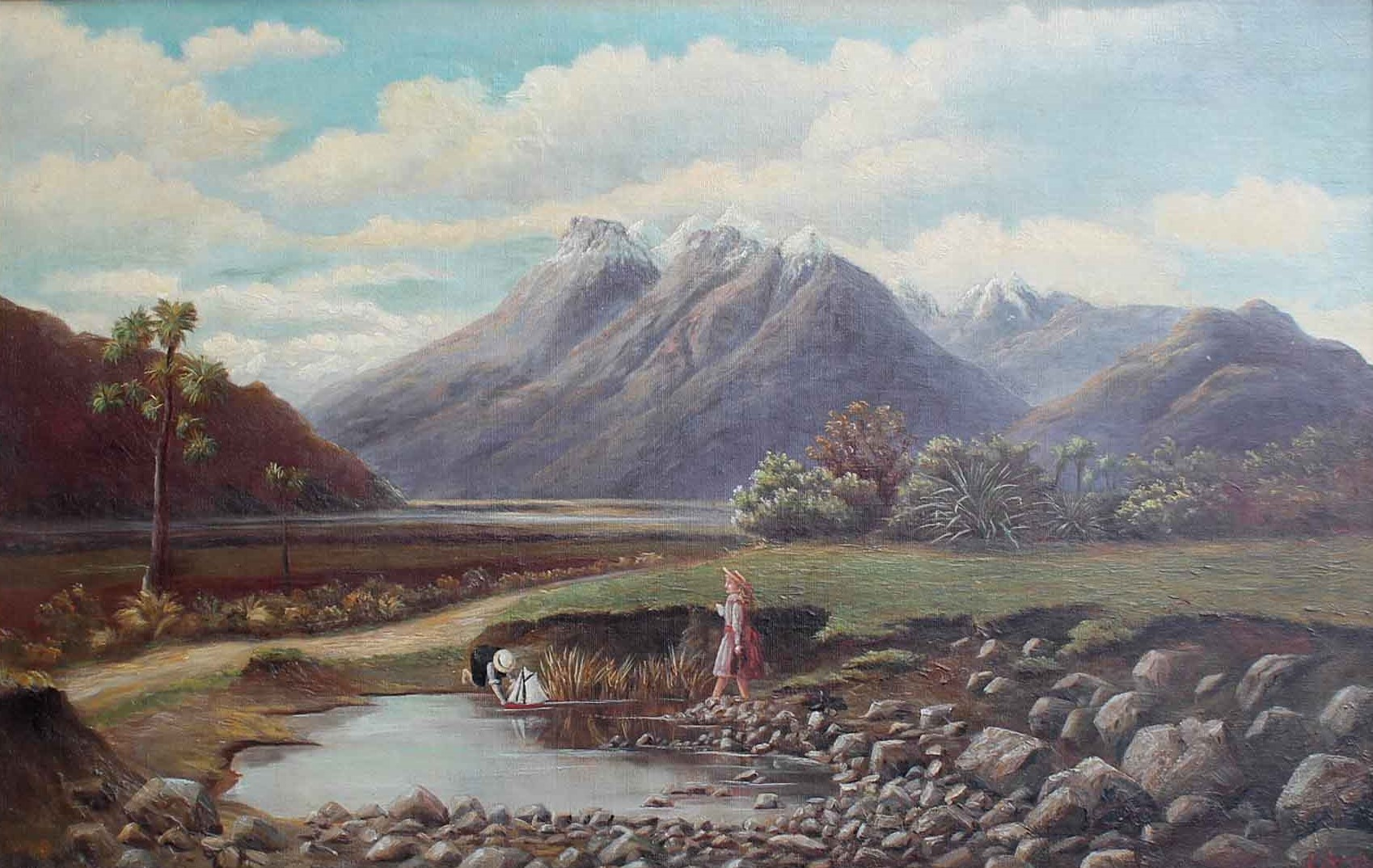
Eliza Anscombe, 1892 oil 55 cm x 85 cm, Private Collection, Auckland, New Zealand
