= Maurice Marshall =

New Zealand middle-distance runner

Maurice Marshall MBE
Personal information
- Born: Maurice Lane Marshall; 12 January 1927 Thames, New Zealand
- Died: 16 May 2013 (aged 86) Hamilton, New Zealand
- Spouse: Elizabeth Mary Conradi (m. 1954)
- Children: 3

Sport
- Country: New Zealand
- Sport: Track and field

Achievements and titles
- National finals: 1 mile champion (1951, 1952)
- Personal bests: 800 m – 1:53.5; 1 mile – 4:11.8
Medal record
Men's athletics
Representing New Zealand
Commonwealth Games
Bronze medal – third place	1950 Auckland	1 mile

Maurice "Moss" Lane Marshall MBE (12 January 1927 – 16 May 2013) was a New Zealand middle-distance athlete.

== Early life and family ==
Marshall was born in Thames on 12 January 1927, the son of Henry Horace Marshall and Constance Marshall (née Hill). In 1954, he married Elizabeth Mary "Betty" Conradi at All Hallows Chapel, Southwell School, Hamilton, and the couple went on to have three children.

== Athletics ==
Marshall represented New Zealand at the 1950 British Empire Games in Auckland, where he won a bronze medal in the 1 mile.

The following year, he won the first of his two New Zealand national athletics titles, winning the 1 mile in a time of 4:17.7. In 1952, he won his second 1-mile championship, in a personal best time of 4:11.8.

Marshall competed for New Zealand at the 1952 Helsinki Olympics in both the 1500 m and the 800 m, but did not progress beyond the heats.

== Teaching career ==
A schoolteacher, Marshall joined the staff of Southwell School in Hamilton in 1953. After a period of teaching in Fiji and at Ngongotahā, he returned to Southwell, and was appointed headmaster in 1972. He retired in 1988, but served as caretaker headmaster for a term in 1994. During his tenure as head, the school roll grew from 160 to 325.

== Honours ==
In the 1989 Queen's Birthday Honours, Marshall was appointed a Member of the Order of the British Empire, for services to education and sport. Parallel streets in Hamilton, Marshall Street and Holland Road, were named after Marshall and his Olympic teammate, John Holland.

== Death ==
Marshall died at his home in Hamilton on 16 May 2013, and his funeral was held in All Hallows Chapel at Southwell. He was buried in Hamilton Park Cemetery. His wife, Betty Marshall, died in 2021.
