= Mount Maunganui (mountain) =

Mountain in New Zealand

Mount Maunganui Mauao
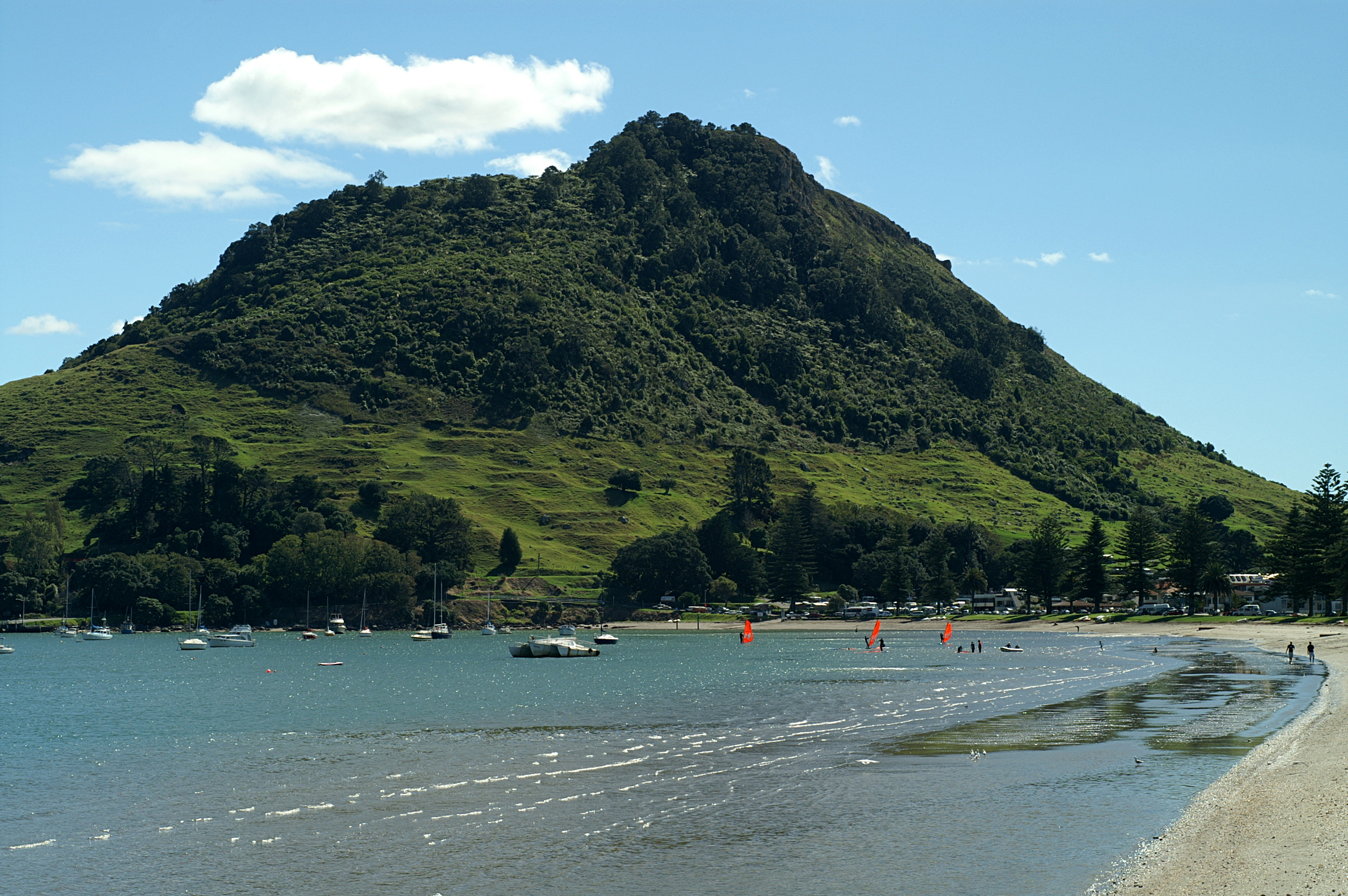
- Mount Maunganui

Highest point
- Elevation: 232 m (761 ft)
- Coordinates: 37.630°S 176.171°E

Geography
- Location: Tauranga, New Zealand
- Topo map: NZMS 260 sheet: U14

Geology
- Rock age: 2.35 ± 0.06 Ma
- Mountain type: Lava dome

Climbing
- Easiest route: Trail

Mount Maunganui, or Mauao, known colloquially as The Mount, is a 232 metre (760 foot) lava dome at the end of a tombolo in the Tauranga suburb of Mount Maunganui in New Zealand, beside the eastern entrance to the city's harbour.

Local Māori consider Mauao to be tapu (sacred), and it plays an important role in their mythology. They own the mountain and manage it jointly with Tauranga City Council.

Mauao is open to the public and is popular for scenic walks, jogging, paragliding and hang gliding. In recent years, fires and storm damage have required replanting and track repairs.

== Etymology ==
'Maunganui' means 'big mountain' in English, thus 'Mount Maunganui' means 'mountain big mountain' and is an example of a tautological place name. The alternative name 'Mauao' means 'caught by the morning sun'.

== Geology ==
Mount Maunganui is a prominent rhyolite lava dome located at the northern end of the Tauranga Volcanic Centre. It is part of the Minden Rhyolite Subgroup, a collection of at least 17 Late Pliocene to Early Pleistocene lava domes with ages ranging from 1.95 to 2.89 Ma. The youngest volcanic deposits on Mount Maunganui are dated to 2.35 ± 0.06 million years ago. Since then, the dome has undergone erosion as volcanic activity shifted to the modern Taupō Volcanic Zone.

During the Last Glacial Maximum, when sea levels were up to 120 metres (390 ft) below present levels, the Tauranga Basin was dry, fully connecting Mount Maunganui to the mainland. As sea levels rose during the Holocene, Mount Maunganui became an island before the accumulation of marine beach deposits formed a tombolo around 4,000 years ago, thereby reuniting it with the mainland.

== Māori legend ==
In the ancient times of the Māori people, there lived a nameless hill. He sat alone in a discarded inland area and was slave to Otanewainuku, the most prestigious mountain of Tauranga Moana (greater Tauranga area). Nearby there lived a captivating hill whose name was Puwhenua; she was adorned with the beauty of Tanemahuta (God of the Forest). The nameless one desired the affection of Puwhenua, but her heart had already been won by Otanewainuku. This resulted in disparity which led the nameless one to drown himself in Te Moananui-a-Kiwa (Pacific Ocean). So he called upon his companions, the patupaiarehe (fairy people), who dwelt in the dark recesses of the forest. The patupaiarehe were people of the night and possessed magical powers. The nameless one knew that with their help his ambition to end his life would be accomplished. When night fell, they laced the nameless one with dozens of ropes and began to heave and pull. The land rumbled as the patupaiarehe forced the nameless one from his position. A valley was gouged as they heaved him along, forming the Waimapu River. They continued along the Tauranga Moana channels where Hairini, Maungatapu and Matapihi reside. Upon their arrival near the great ocean of Kiwa, daybreak was fast approaching. Unfortunately for the nameless one this was proving to be a complex and problematic task. The rays of Tama Nui te Ra (Sun) began to light up the summit of the nameless hill and the patupaiarehe were exposed to the rays of light, so they retreated back to the depths of the forests.

The patupaiarehe decided to give the name Mauao to this mountain, which now marks the entrance into Tauranga Harbour. The literal translation of Mauao is "caught by the dawn". In time this mountain assumed its own great prestige and mana even over his once rival Otanewainuku and now stands as the symbol of all tribes of Tauranga Moana.

== History ==
=== Early history of Tauranga and Mauao ===
The name Tauranga can be translated as meaning 'place of rest' or 'anchorage'. The earliest people known to have resided in the Tauranga area are the Purukupenga, whose name alone survives, and the Ngamarama, who inhabited all the land from the Waimapu Stream to the Kaimai Ranges.

Many people of different waka passed through and some stayed. This included those of the Tainui canoe, which made only a brief stay, although evidence of their visit can be linked to “nga pehi o Tainui”, the ballast of Tainui, now known as Ratahi Rock.

Another was the Te Arawa canoe which made landfall at Maketu, with some of her crew occupying the land between the Tauranga harbour and the Kaituna River. After the departure of Tainui the Takitimu canoe then entered the Tauranga harbour. Its captain, Tamatea Arikinui, climbed to the summit of Mauao (Mount Maunganui) to offer karakia (prayers) and to bury there the mauri (life force) of his people.

Tamatea built a pā (stockaded village) on the hill known as Maungatawa, where his people settled. Ngati Ranginui all descended from Tamatea’s grandson, Ranginui. In later years Ngaiterangi after many failed attempts of looking to settle themselves in a permanent area led a massive raid on the Ngati Ranginui pā site on top of Mauao (around 1700). This attack resulted in the pā falling to Ngaiterangi, and is known as the 'Battle of the Kokowai'.

According to archaeologist there has been evidence of three pā sites recorded on top of and around Mauao. The final encounter of warfare ended at the cliffs of Mauao between Ngaiterangi and Ngapuhi. Armed with muskets Ngapuhi decided to intimidate and force their way through under the command of Te Morenga in 1820, the large pā site was not re-occupied after this battle. A peace was made with Ngapuhi shortly afterwards by Te Waru of Ngaiterangi.

=== MV Ranui ===
At about 5pm on 28 December 1950, 23 people were drowned (three crew and 20 passengers) when the 6 tonne, 14 metre (45 foot) passenger launch Ranui was driven on to North West Rock at the base of the mountain by an exceptionally high wave. The launch capsized and was smashed to pieces. The only survivor was 19-year-old Phillip "Bluey" Smith. A Marine Court found no fault with the boat's master or owners.

The vessel's engine was wedged between rocks on the seaward edge of the base track above North West Rock. A brass plaque was installed in memory of those who died.

=== January 2026 Landslide ===
On 22 January 2026 at around 9:30 am, a major landslide on Mount Maunganui's eastern face occurred following intense rainfall the previous day. The slip buried several cabins and campervans, killing at least 6 people.

== Ownership ==
On 14 May 2008, New Zealand's Parliament transferred ownership of Mauao from the Crown to the Ngāi Te Rangi, Ngāti Ranginui and Ngāti Pūkenga iwi. They had lost the mountain after the 1863 land wars.

Iwi jointly manage Mauao alongside Tauranga City Council.

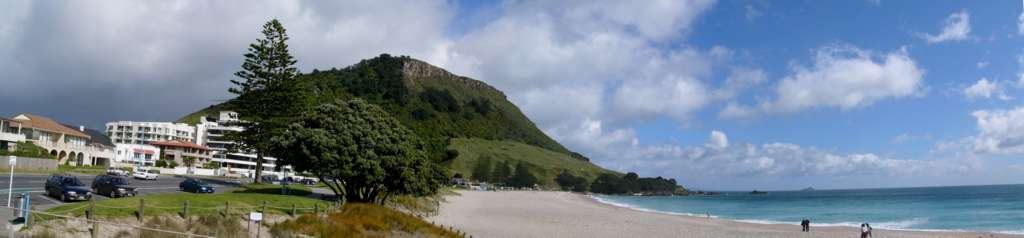
Panorama of the mountain and the Main Beach

== See also ==
- List of volcanoes in New Zealand
