= Coromandel Range =

Mountain range in North Island of New Zealand

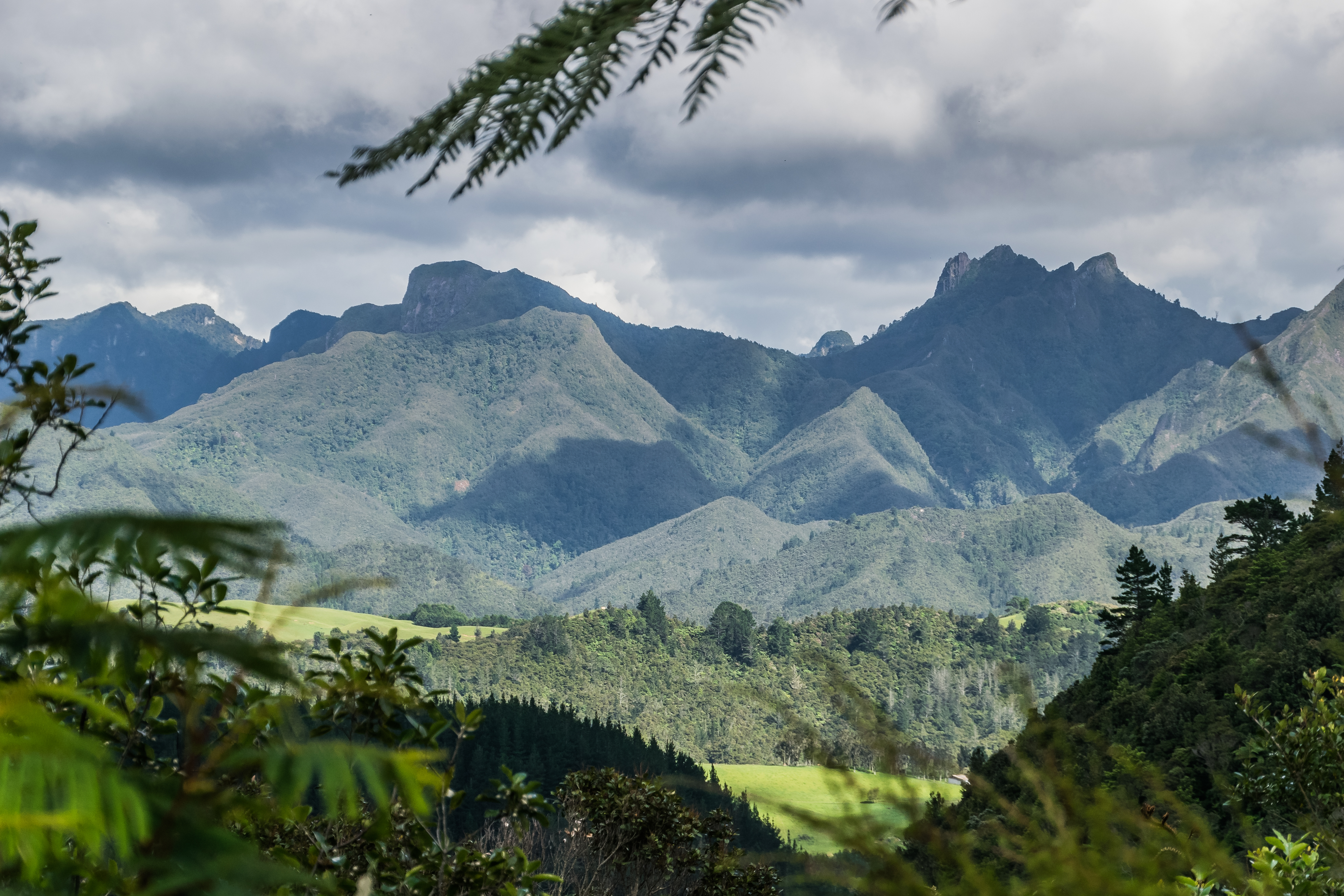
- Coromandel Range, including the Pinnacles

Highest point
- Elevation: 892 m (2,927 ft)
- Coordinates: 37°00′S 175°40′E

Geography
- Approximate extent of Coromandel Range including subranges such as the Moehau Range

Geology
- Rock age(s): Jurassic/Cretaceous onwards, between 5 (some volcanic features) and 150 million years ago (basement greywacke)
- Mountain type(s): Mixed - sedimentary greywacke in far north with one plutonic and mostly andestic and rhyolitic formations in the southern majority
- Rock type(s): Predominantly in north Manaia Hill Group greywackeˌ sandstones and siltstones (Waipapa terrane) and in south andesite and rhyolite volcanics
- Volcanic arc: Coromandel Volcanic Zone
- Last eruption: ~ 5 million years ago

The Coromandel Range is a volcanic mountain range in the Coromandel Volcanic Zone running the length of the Coromandel Peninsula in the North Island of New Zealand. It is located 60 kilometres (37 mi) east of the city of Auckland, and runs north–south for approximately 110 kilometres. It is at a right angle to the Tararua ranges. The highest point in the range is Mount Moehau (892 metres/2927 feet), at the northern end of the peninsula within the Moehau Range. There are numerous peaks over 600 metres in height. In pre-European times, the southern Coromandel Range was densely forested by trees such as kauri, mataī and tawa, and was a home for birds such as kererū, tūī, kākā and kiwi. Greywacke from the ranges was a source for many stone tools used by Hauraki Māori.

The range is one of several that form a volcanic origin bone running through the northern North Island. To the south of the Coromandel Range, separated by the winding Karangahake Gorge, the bone continues with the Kaimai Range.

The large island of Great Barrier, at the entrance to the Hauraki Gulf due north of the Coromandel Peninsula, can be thought of as a northern continuation of this bone of the Coromandel Volcanic Zone.

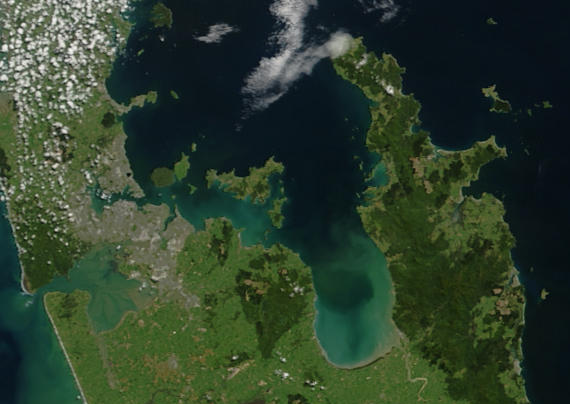
A true-colour image showing Auckland city (left), the Hauraki Gulf (centre) and the Coromandel Peninsula (right). The scene was acquired by NASA's Terra satellite on 23 October 2002.

== See also ==
- Messrs. Smyth Brothers' Tramway
