= Anthony Chivers (athlete) =

Athlete who competed for England

Personal information
- Nationality: British (English)
- Born: April 1920 Writhlington, Somerset, England
- Died: 3 May 2015 (aged 95) Hampshire, England

Sport
- Sport: Athletics
- Event: long-distance
- Club: Reading AC
Medal record
Athletics
Representing England
British Empire Games
Bronze medal – third place	1950 Auckland	3 miles

Anthony Hugh Chivers (April 1920 – 3 May 2015) was a male athlete who competed for England at the Commonwealth Games.

== Biography ==
Chivers became the British 6 miles champion after winning the British AAA Championships title at the 1947 AAA Championships. At the 1949 AAA Championships Chivers finished second behind John Joe Barry.

Chivers represented England and won a bronze medal in the 3 miles at the 1950 British Empire Games in Auckland, New Zealand. He also competed in the 6 miles race.
