= Harold Nelson (athlete) =

New Zealand long-distance runner

Harold Nelson MBE
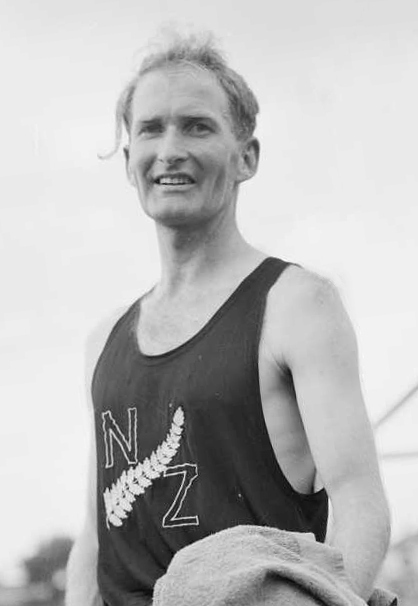
- Nelson at the 1950 British Empire Games

Personal information
- Born: William Harold Nelson; 26 April 1923 Dunedin, New Zealand
- Died: 1 July 2011 (aged 88) Richmond, New Zealand
- Height: 1.66 m (5 ft 5 1/2 in)
- Weight: 57 kg (126 lb)
- Spouse: Margaret Joyce Calder (m. 1948; died 2006)
- Relatives: Eliza Anscombe (grandmother); Edmund Anscombe (great-uncle)

Sport
- Country: New Zealand
- Sport: Track and field
- Coached by: Bernie McKernan

Achievements and titles
- National finals: 1 mile champion (1947); 3 miles champion (1947, 1948); 6 miles champion (1948); Cross country champion (1946, 1951)
- Personal bests: 1 mile — 4:14.8; 3 miles — 14:19.4; 6 miles — 29:57.4
Medal record
Representing New Zealand
Commonwealth Games
Gold medal – first place	1950 Auckland	6 miles
Silver medal – second place	1950 Auckland	3 miles

William Harold Nelson MBE (26 April 1923 – 1 July 2011) was a New Zealand long-distance runner who won two medals at the 1950 British Empire Games in Auckland.

== Early life and family ==
Born in Dunedin on 26 April 1923, Nelson was the son of Grace Ledingham Stewart—daughter of artist Eliza Anscombe—and William Alexander Anthony Nelson. He was educated at Otago Boys' High School, and was inspired to take up athletics after seeing a film in 1938 about the 1936 Summer Olympics in Berlin that included New Zealander Jack Lovelock's winning the 1500 m gold medal. Nelson served with the Royal New Zealand Air Force (RNZAF) during World War II.

On 20 March 1948, Nelson married Margaret Joyce Calder, and the couple went on to have four children.

Nelson graduated from the University of Otago in 1952 with a Bachelor of Arts.

== Athletics ==
Coached by Bernie McKernan, Nelson first came to national prominence as an athlete when he won the under-19 one-mile title at the New Zealand junior championships in 1941, in a national junior record time of 4:30.0. His athletics career was interrupted by World War II, but during the war he won a number of services athletics events. Following an accident while serving with the RNZAF, Nelson was invalided home and he feared that he may never run again. However, after an operation, he was able to resume his running career.

In 1946, Nelson won the national cross-country championship, and in 1947 he won the New Zealand one-mile and three-mile titles at the national championships in Auckland. The same year, he captured the one- and three-mile titles at the New South Wales amateur athletics championships at the Sydney Cricket Ground.

At the New Zealand athletics championships in 1948, Nelson won both the three- and six-mile events. His time of 29:57.4 over six miles was a New Zealand record, and made him the second-fastest athlete in the world over the distance at that time.

Nelson was subsequently selected as team captain and flagbearer for the New Zealand team at the 1948 Olympic Games in London. Competing in the 10,000 m, he suffered from dehydration and had to withdraw after 17 laps. In the heats of the 5000 m, he recorded a time of 15:34.4, finishing sixth and not progressing to the final.

At the 1950 British Empire Games in Auckland, Nelson won the gold medal in the 6 miles, in a time of 30:29.6. He also competed in the 3 miles, winning the silver medal with a time of 14:28.8, behind Englishman Len Eyre.

Nelson won his final national championship title, the cross country, in 1951.

== Later life and death ==
A schoolteacher, Nelson and his family moved to Nelson in 1951, where he taught at Nelson College for 12 years. He then taught for six years at Waimea College, where he coached the young Rod Dixon. Nelson completed his teaching career at Nelson Polytechnic, retiring in 1983.

Nelson remained active in athletics as a coach and official in the Nelson area. He organised the athletics at the 1983 South Pacific Games in Apia, and was a track official at the 1990 Commonwealth Games in Auckland. He participated in the 2000 Summer Olympics torch relay when it travelled through Wellington. He served two terms as president of the New Zealand Amateur Athletics Coaches' Association, and was a various times director of athletics coaching in Western Samoa, the Cook Islands and the Solomon Islands.

In the 1986 Queen's Birthday Honours, Nelson was appointed a Member of the Order of the British Empire, for services to athletics. In 2006, he was the inaugural inductee into the Nelson Legends of Sport gallery. He was recognised as New Zealand's oldest living Olympian in 2009.

Nelson suffered a stroke in 1988, and in 2006 his wife, Joyce, died. Nelson died at Richmond on 1 July 2011, and his ashes were buried with those of his wife at Marsden Valley Cemetery.

== Legacy ==
Since November 2011, an annual athletics meet at Nelson's Saxton Field has been called the Harold Nelson Classic. The southern entrance to the Saxton Field athletics track was renamed Harold Nelson Way in 2012.
