= 1925 in New Zealand =

- Decades: 1900s; 1910s; 1920s; 1930s; 1940s
- See also: History of New Zealand; List of years in New Zealand; Timeline of New Zealand history

The following lists events that happened during 1925 in New Zealand.

== Incumbents ==
=== Regal and viceregal ===
- Head of State – George V
- Governor-General – Sir Charles Fergusson
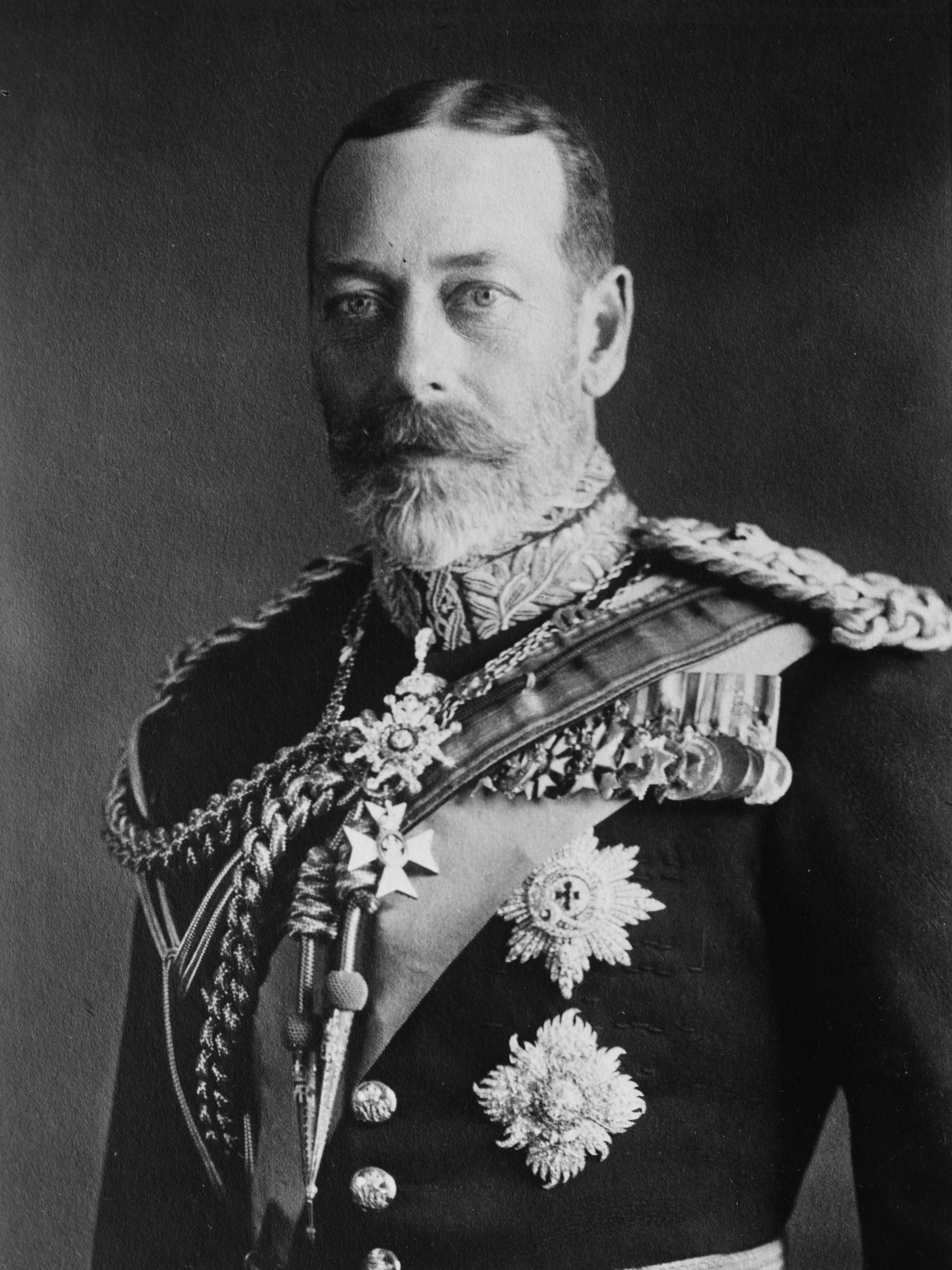
George V

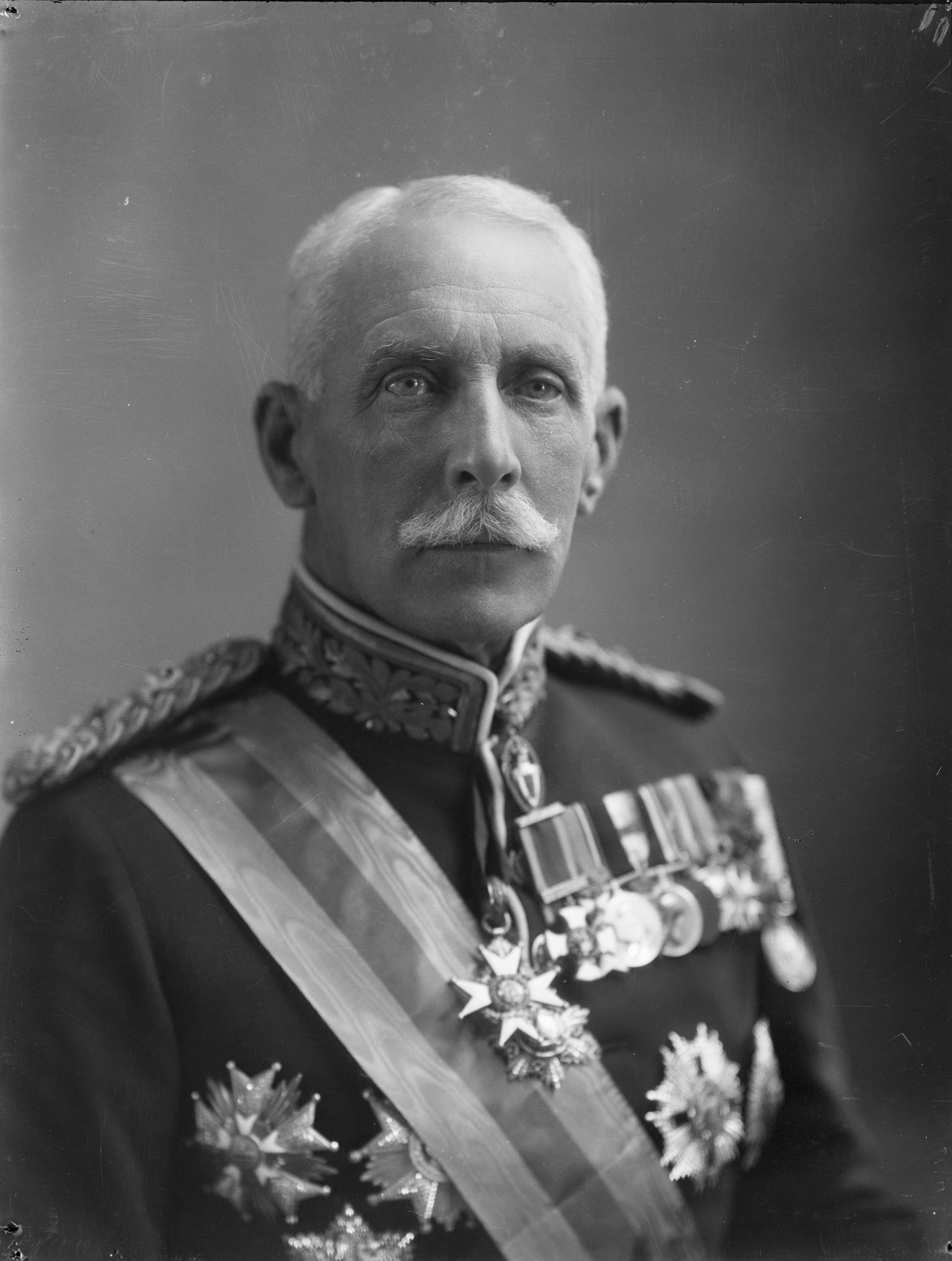
Sir Charles Fergusson

=== Government ===
The 21st New Zealand Parliament concludes, with its final year marked by the death of premier William Massey. The Reform Party governs as a minority with the support of independents. Following the general election in November, the Reform Party holds a much stronger position with 55 of the 80 seats.

- Speaker of the House – Charles Statham
- Prime Minister – William Massey until 10 May, then Francis Bell from 14 to 30 May, then Gordon Coates
- Minister of Finance – William Massey until 10 May, then William Nosworthy from 14 May
- Minister of External Affairs – Francis Bell
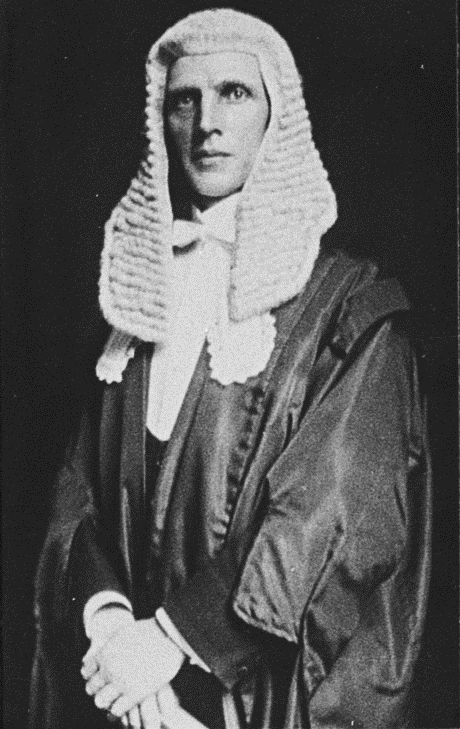
Charles Statham

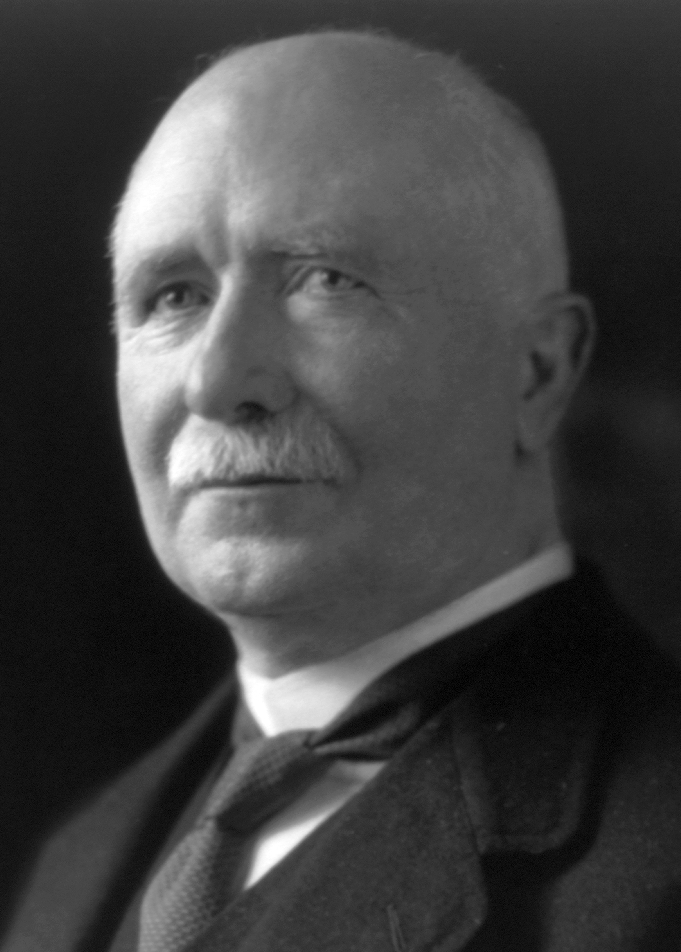
William Massey

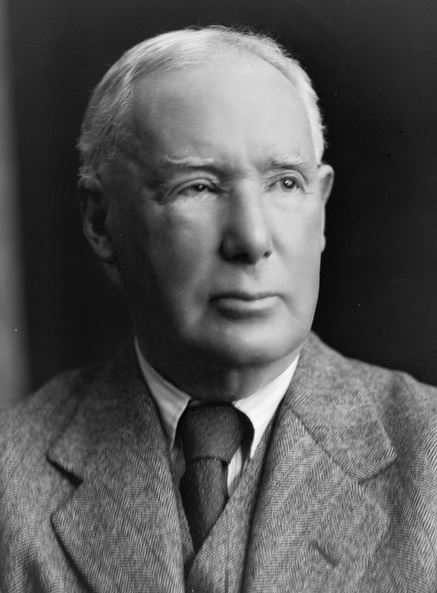
Francis Bell

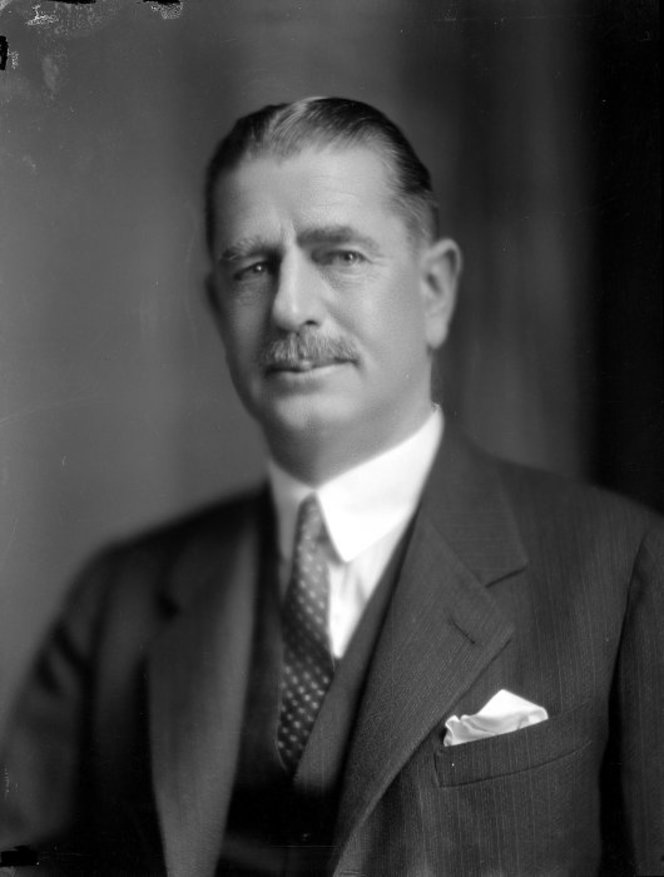
Gordon Coates

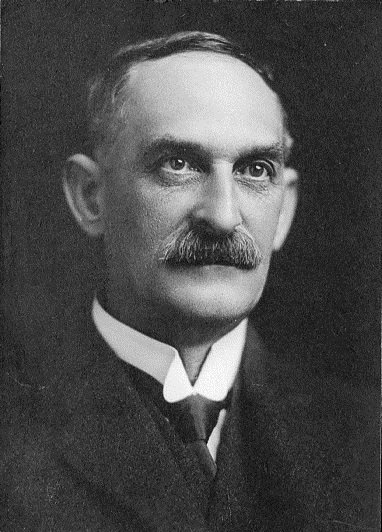
William Nosworthy

=== Parliamentary opposition ===
- Leader of the Opposition – Thomas Wilford (Liberal Party) until 13 August, then George Forbes (Liberal) until 4 November, then vacant (until June 1926)
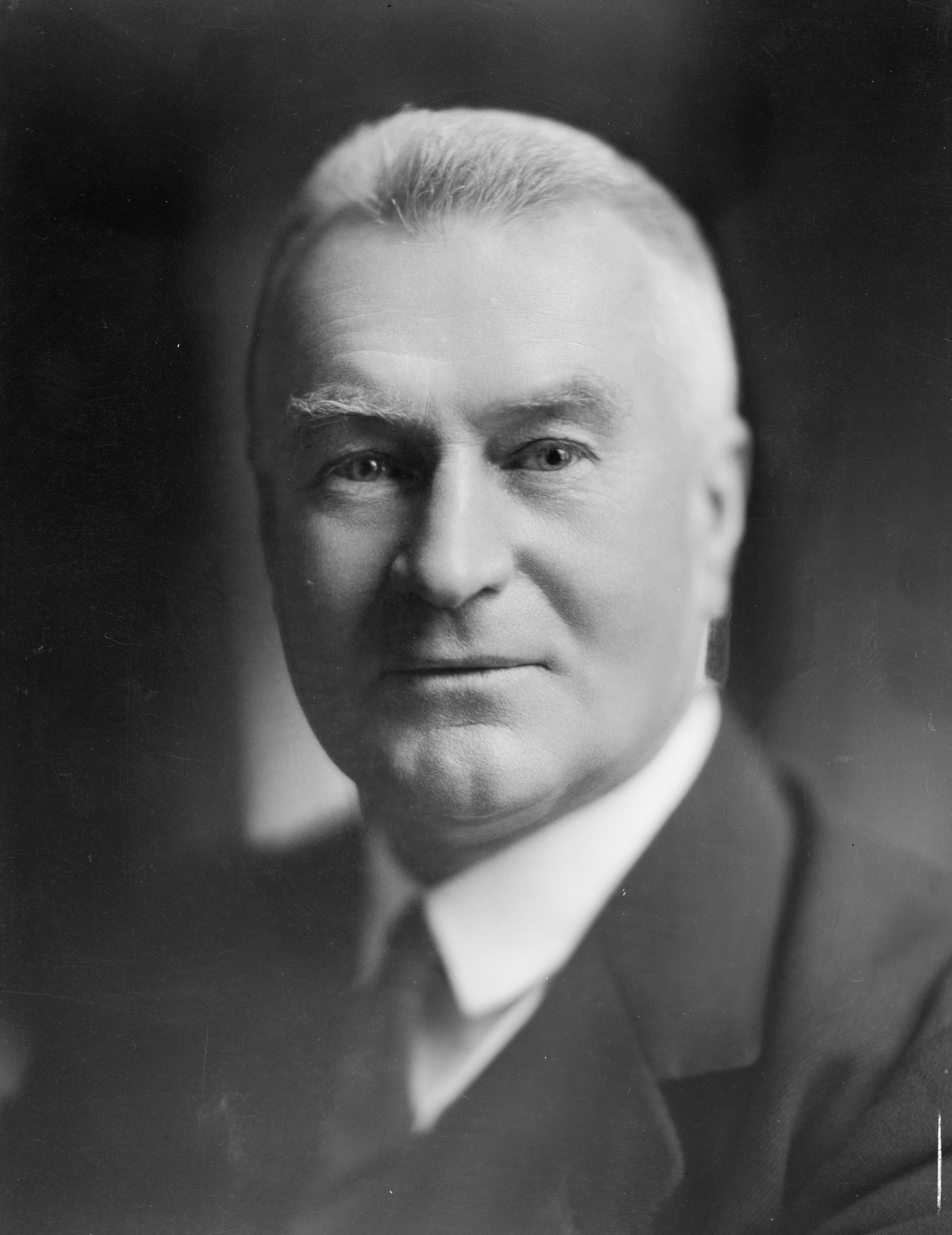
Thomas Wilford

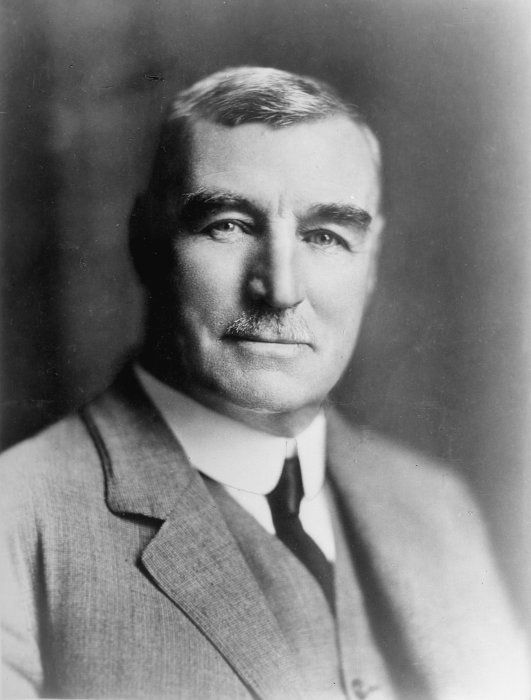
George Forbes

=== Judiciary ===
- Chief Justice – Sir Robert Stout
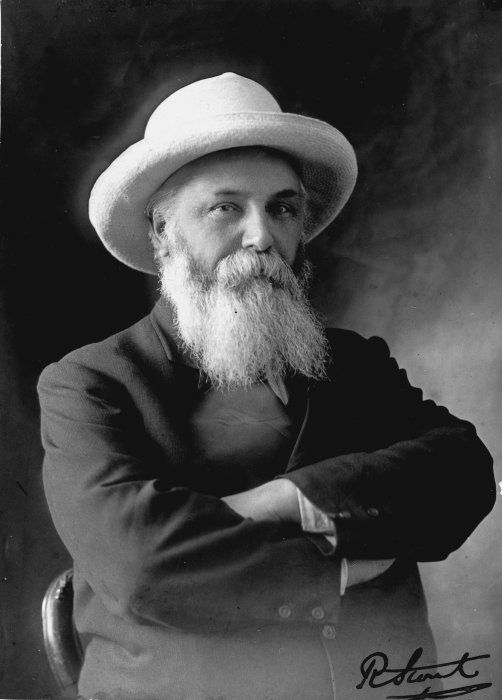
Robert Stout

=== Main centre leaders ===
- Mayor of Auckland – James Gunson, succeeded by George Baildon
- Mayor of Wellington – Robert Wright, succeeded by Charles Norwood
- Mayor of Christchurch – James Flesher, succeeded by John Archer
- Mayor of Dunedin – Harold Tapley
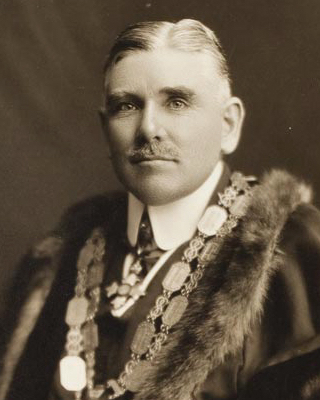
James Gunson

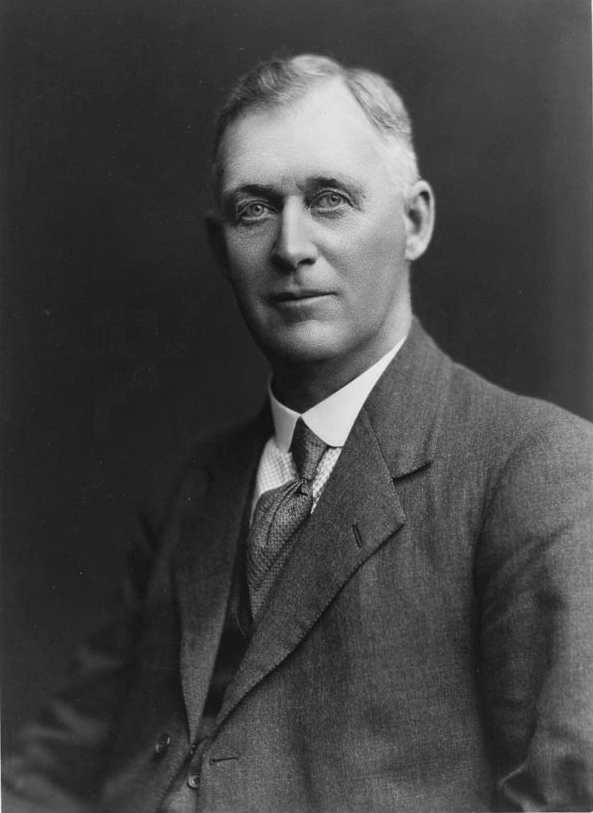
George Baildon

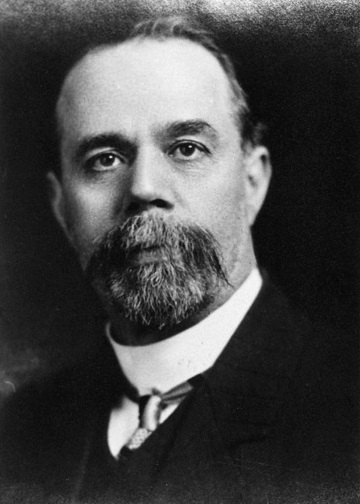
Robert Wright

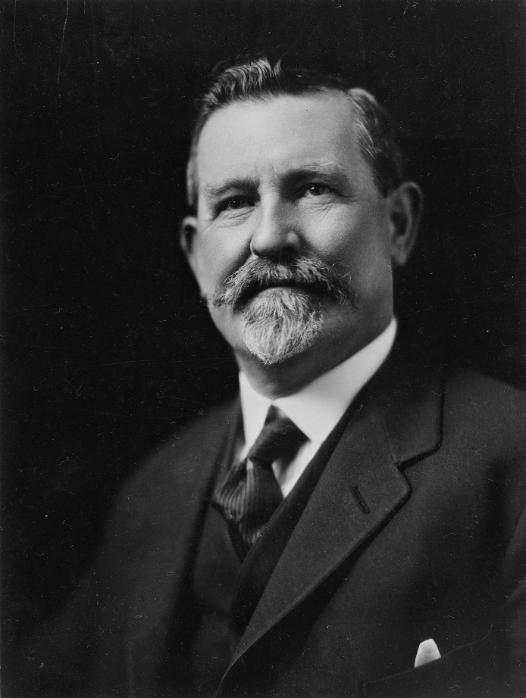
Charles Norwood

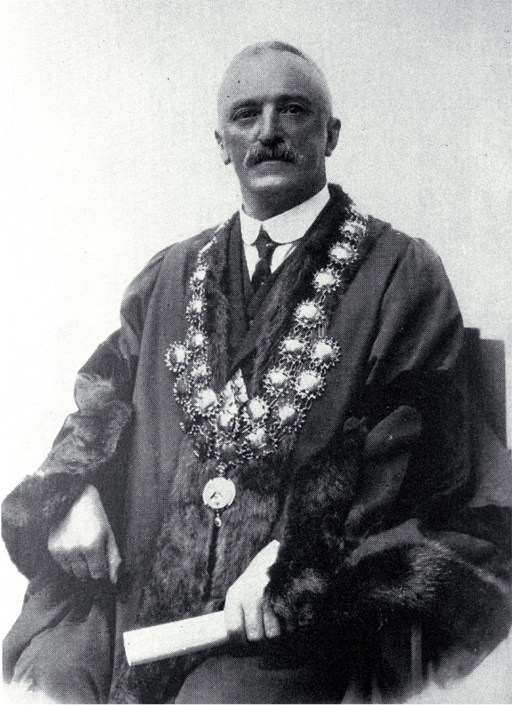
James Flesher

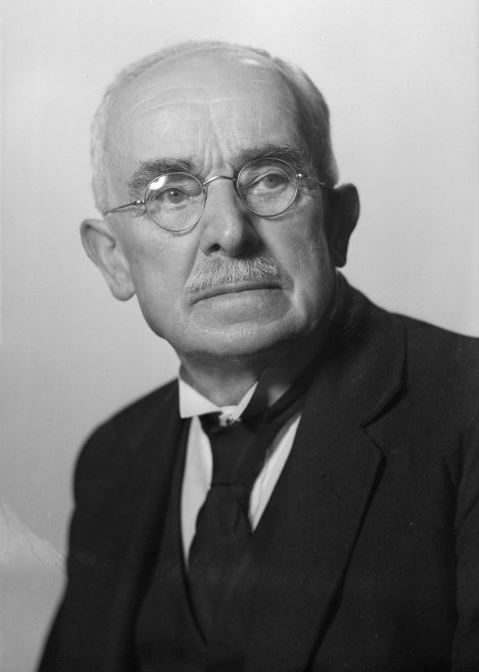
John Archer

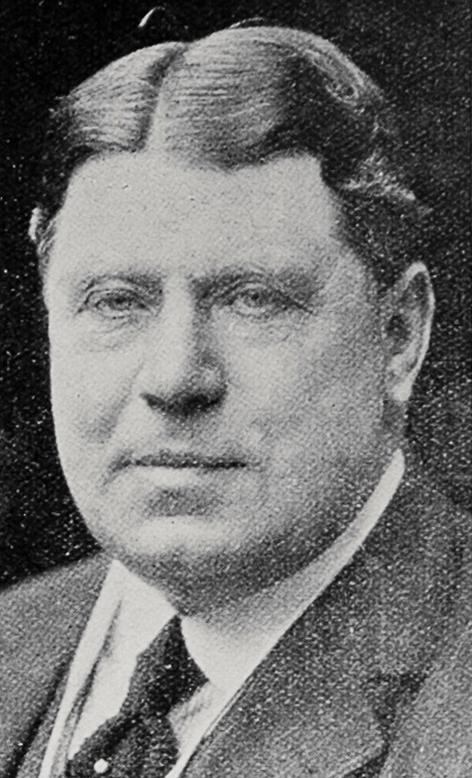
Harold Tapley

== Events ==
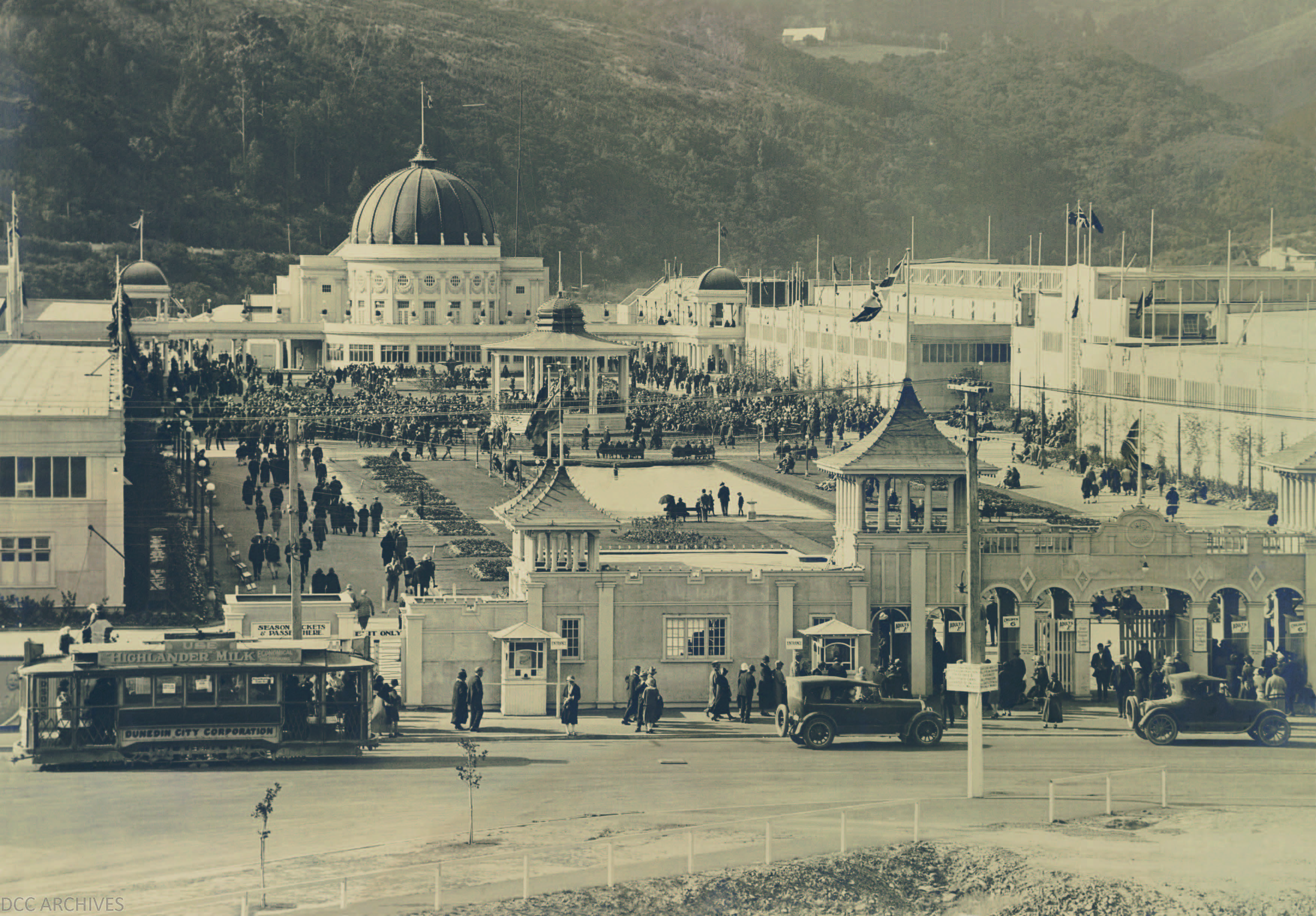
The New Zealand and South Seas Exhibition in Dunedin

- 1 January
  - National scheme for vehicle registration plates comes into force
  - Ernest Rutherford is appointed to the Order of Merit
- 1 April – The Foodstuffs cooperative is registered
- 21 April – Alfred Averill succeeds Churchill Julius as Archbishop of New Zealand
- 10 May – Prime Minister William Massey dies in office
- 31 May – Tahupotiki Wiremu Rātana announces his intention to form the Rātana Church
- 17 June – The Franklin by-election, caused by the death of William Massey, is won by Ewen McLennan (Reform)
- August – The U.S. Navy's Pacific battlefleet of 57 vessels including 12 battleships visits New Zealand during a goodwill tour of the South Pacific after manoeuvres off Hawaii.
- September – A leopard escapes Auckland Zoo and remains loose for several weeks.
- 3–4 November – The 1925 general election is held, with the Reform Party winning 55 of the 80 seats in the House of Representatives
- 4 November – An Order in Council provides for the transfer of Tokelau from the Gilbert and Ellice Islands colony to New Zealand (formally gazetted 11 February 1926)
- 17 November – The New Zealand and South Seas International Exhibition opens at Logan Park, Dunedin
- Undated – Lloyd Mandeno develops the single-wire earth return electrical distribution system

== Arts and literature ==
See: 1925 in art, 1925 in literature, Category:1925 books

- Allen Adair published by Jane Mander

=== Music ===
See: 1925 in music

=== Radio ===
See: Public broadcasting in New Zealand

- The Radio Broadcasting Company (RBC) began broadcasts throughout New Zealand

=== Film ===
See: 1925 in film, List of New Zealand feature films, Cinema of New Zealand, Category:1925 films

- Rewi's Last Stand by Rudall Hayward
- The Adventures of Algy
- The Romance of Hinemoa

== Sport ==
=== Chess ===
- The 34th National Chess Championship is held in Nelson, and is won by C. J. S. Purdy of Sydney

=== Football ===
- The Chatham Cup is won by YMCA (Wellington)
- Provincial league champions:
  - Auckland – Thistle
  - Canterbury – Sunnyside
  - Hawke's Bay – Whakatu
  - Nelson – Thistle
  - Otago – Northern
  - South Canterbury – Rangers
  - Southland – Central
  - Taranaki – Manaia
  - Wanganui – Eastown Workshops
  - Wellington – YMCA

=== Golf ===
- The 15th New Zealand Open championship is won by Ewen MacFarlane, an amateur, with an aggregate of 308
- The 29th National Amateur Championships are held at Christchurch (men) and Miramar (women)
  - Men – Tom Horton (Masterton)
  - Women – Phyllis Dodgshun (Dunedin)

=== Horse racing ===
==== Harness racing ====
- New Zealand Trotting Cup – Ahuriri
- Auckland Trotting Cup – Nelson Derby

==== Thoroughbred racing ====
- New Zealand Cup – The Banker
- Avondale Gold Cup – Star Ranger
- Auckland Cup – Rapine
- Wellington Cup – Surveyor
- New Zealand Derby – Runnymede

=== Lawn bowls ===
The national outdoor lawn bowls championships are held in Wellington.

- Men's singles champion – J. D. Best (Dunedin Bowling Club)
- Men's pair champions – C. W. Davis, J. W. Sexton (skip) (Newtown Bowling Club)
- Men's fours champions – H. J. Wernham, F. T. Wilson, A. C. McIntyre, R. N. Pilkington (skip) (Hamilton Bowling Club)

=== Rugby union ===
- The All Blacks tour New South Wales
- The Auckland Rugby Union makes Eden Park its headquarters
- Hawke's Bay defends he Ranfurly Shield for the third consecutive full season, defeating Wairarapa (22–3), Canterbury (24–18), Southland (31–12), Taranaki (28–3), Wellington (20–11) and Otago (34–14)

== Births ==
=== January ===
- 4 January – Roger Drayton, politician
- 12 January – Allan Burnett, anarchist activist
- 13 January – Elwyn Welch, ornithologist
- 22 January – Harata Solomon, Māori leader, entertainer
- 25 January – Eric Dempster, cricketer
- 26 January – Barbara Heslop, immunologist

=== February ===
- 1 February – Assid Corban, politician
- 2 February – Mirek Smíšek, potter
- 3 February – Tay Wilson, sports administrator
- 7 February
  - Ron Broom, cricketer
  - John Oakley, cricketer
- 19 February – Trevor Martin, cricket umpire
- 22 February – Alexander Grant, ballet dancer and teacher, dance company director
- 23 February
  - Fraser Colman, politician
  - Ted McCoy, architect
- 25 February – Campbell Smith, playwright, poet, engraver
- 27 February – Joan Hastings, swimmer

=== March ===
- 8 March – Leonard Mitchell, artist
- 9 March
  - Johnny Borland, high jumper, athletics administrator
  - Aubrey Ritchie, cricketer
- 13 March
  - John McCraw, pedologist, local historian
  - Rahera Windsor, Māori leader in the United Kingdom
- 21 March – John Heslop, surgeon, cricket administrator
- 25 March – O. E. Middleton, writer

=== April ===
- 4 April – Harvey Kreyl, rugby league player
- 5 April – Milan Mrkusich, artist
- 17 April – Vern Clare, musician, cabaret owner
- 19 April
  - Eva Rickard, Māori leader and activist
  - Maurie Robertson, rugby league player and coach
- 23 April – Al Hobman, professional wrestler, trainer and promoter
- 24 April – Dorothy Butler, children's author and bookseller, memoirist, reading advocate
- 25 April – Neville Black, rugby union and rugby league player
- 28 April – David Brokenshire, architect, potter

=== May ===
- 2 May – Frances Porter, writer, historian
- 14 May
  - Gordon Gostelow, actor
  - W. H. Oliver, poet, historian
- 16 May – John Ziman, physicist, humanist
- 20 May
  - Maurice Crow, weightlifter, rowing coxswain
  - Bert Potter, commune leader
- 27 May – Arthur Campbell, chemist

=== June ===
- 3 June – Trevor Barber, cricketer
- 11 June – Tiny White, rugby union player and administrator, politician
- 25 June – Alistair Campbell, poet, playwright, novelist
- 27 June – Ben Couch, rugby union player, politician
- 29 June – Doody Townley, harness-racing driver

=== July ===
- 2 July – Philip Liner, radio broadcaster
- 8 July – Elwyn Richardson, educationalist
- 9 July – Rex Bergstrom, econometrician
- 10 July – Dixie Cockerton, netball player and coach, cricketer, school principal
- 15 July – Stuart Jones, golfer
- 16 July – J. B. Trapp, historian
- 18 July – Allan Elsom, rugby union player
- 20 July – Eric Watson, cricketer
- 26 July – Alister Atkinson, rugby league player
- 31 July
  - John O'Brien, politician
  - Helen Ryburn, school principal, local-body politician

=== August ===
- 3 August – John Robertson, public servant
- 5 August – Bob Duff, rugby union player, local-body politician
- 13 August – Peter Beaven, architect
- 15 August – James Brown, public servant
- 23 August – John Armitt, amateur wrestler
- 28 August – Trevor Young, politician
- 30 August – Joan Hart, athlete

=== September ===
- 1 September – Te Aue Davis, tohunga raranga
- 4 September
  - Phil Amos, politician
  - Bruce Stewart, television scriptwriter
- 19 September – Lyn Forster, arachnologist

=== October ===
- 7 October
  - Bryan Drake, opera singer
  - Bill Wolfgramm, musician
- 9 October – Bill Schaefer, field hockey player
- 19 October – David Gould, rower, businessman
- 21 October – Ian Ballinger, sports shooter
- 22 October – George Grindley, geologist
- 23 October – Brian Nordgren, rugby league player
- 25 October – Donald Brian, cricketer
- 30 October
  - Audrey Eagle, botanical illustrator
  - Colin Kay, athlete, politician
- 31 October – Ngaire Lane, swimmer

=== November ===
- 6 November – Ian Cross, novelist, journalist, broadcasting and arts administrator
- 12 November – Bill Toomath, architect
- 20 November – Bill Subritzky, property developer, evangelist
- 23 November – Tui Flower, food writer
- 26 November – Ross Taylor, geochemist, planetary scientist
- 27 November – Reginald Johansson, field hockey player
- 29 November – Peter Jacobson, poet

=== December ===
- 1 December
  - Noeline Gourley, field hockey player, athlete, woodturner
  - Thomas Thorp, jurist
- 5 December – Jack Tynan, field hockey player, cricketer
- 10 December – Betty Maker, cricketer
- 23 December – Ellis Child, cricketer
- 31 December – Ray Bell, rugby union player

=== Exact date unknown ===
- Nightmarch, Thoroughbred racehorse

== Deaths ==
=== January–March ===
- 3 January – John Endean, gold miner, hotel proprietor (born 1844)
- 11 January – Oliver Samuel, politician (born 1849)
- 13 February – Margaret McKenzie, pioneer (born c.1839)

=== April–June ===
- 14 April – Don Hamilton, rugby union player, cricketer (born 1883)
- 27 April – George Williams, rugby union player (born 1856)
- 10 May – William Massey, politician, Prime Minister of New Zealand (1912–1925) (born 1856)
- 15 May – Stephen Boreham, trade unionist (born 1857)
- 18 May – Sir Theophilus Cooper, jurist (born 1850)
- 19 May
  - Andrew Cameron, Presbyterian minister, educationalist, community leader (born 1855)
  - Frances Wimperis, artist (born 1840)
- 21 May – Samuel Kirkpatrick, businessman (born c.1854)
- 3 June – Frank Surman, rugby union player, athlete (born c.1866)

=== July–September ===
- 18 July – John Sinclair, carpenter, builder, harbourmaster (born 1843)
- 19 July – James Cox, diarist (born 1846)
- 22 July – William McCullough, politician (born 1843)
- 5 August – Emily Harris, painter (born c.1837)
- 9 August – Catherine Adamson, diarist (born 1868)
- 19 August – Harriet Morison, trade unionist, suffragist, public servant (born 1862)
- 1 September – Donald Petrie, botanist (born 1846)
- 7 September Thomas Ronayne, NZR General Manager (retired) (born 1849)
- 15 September – Charles Melvill, military leader (born 1878)
- 18 September – Charles Hayward Izard, politician (born 1862)
- 19 September – Henry Reynolds, butter manufacturer and exporter (born 1849)
- 27 September – Thomas MacGibbon, politician (born 1839)

=== October–December ===
- 2 October – Thomas Hislop, politician (born 1850)
- 20 November – Charles Mackesy, military leader (born 1861)
- 28 November – William Joseph Napier, politician (born 1857)
- 10 December – John Liddell Kelly, journalist, poet (born 1850)
- 13 December - Isa Outhwaite, watercolour artist, poet, social activist and philanthropist (born 1842)
- 29 December – John Crewes, Bible Christian minister, social worker, journalist (born 1847)

== See also ==
- History of New Zealand
- List of years in New Zealand
- Military history of New Zealand
- Timeline of New Zealand history
- Timeline of New Zealand's links with Antarctica
- Timeline of the New Zealand environment
