= Athletics at the 1950 British Empire Games – Women's 80 metres hurdles =

Women's 80 metres hurdles at the Commonwealth Games

The women's 80 metres hurdles event at the 1950 British Empire Games was held on 9 February at the Eden Park in Auckland, New Zealand.

== Medalists ==
Gold	Silver	Bronze
Shirley Strickland; Australia	June Schoch; New Zealand	Janet Shackleton; New Zealand

== Results ==
=== Heats ===
Qualification: First 3 in each heat (Q) qualify directly for the final.

Rank	Heat	Name	Nationality	Time	Notes
1	1	Shirley Strickland	Australia	11.4	Q, GR
2	1	June Schoch	New Zealand	11.4	Q
3	1	Janet Shackleton	New Zealand	11.4	Q
4	1	Dorothy Tyler	England	??.?	
5	1	Jean Desforges	England	??.?	
1	2	Noeline Gourley	New Zealand	11.5	Q
2	2	Pixie Fletcher	New Zealand	11.9	Q
3	2	Ann Stadler	Australia	12.0	Q
4	2	Rosella Thorne	Canada	??.?	
5	2	Bertha Crowther	England	??.?	

=== Final ===
Rank	Lane	Name	Nationality	Time	Notes
1st place, gold medalist(s)	1	Shirley Strickland	Australia	11.6	
2nd place, silver medalist(s)	3	June Schoch	New Zealand	11.6	
3rd place, bronze medalist(s)	2	Janet Shackleton	New Zealand	11.7	
4	5	Noeline Gourley	New Zealand	11.9e	
5	6	Ann Stadler	Australia	11.9e	
6	4	Pixie Fletcher	New Zealand	??.?	
