= Alice Mackenzie =

New Zealand author (1873–1963)

- Born: Alice McKenzie; 1873; Hokitika, New Zealand
- Died: 5 May 1963 (aged 90); Dunedin, New Zealand
- Other name: Mrs. Peter Mackenzie
- Occupation: Writer
- Known for: Author of The Pioneers of Martins Bay
- Spouse: Peter Mackenzie (m. 1902)
- Mother: Margaret McKenzie

Alice Mackenzie (née McKenzie; 1873–2 May 1963) was a New Zealand author, diarist, and poet, best known for her book The Pioneers of Martins Bay. This book recounts her early life in Martins Bay, New Zealand, during the 1870s and 1880s. She is also noted for her supposed sighting of the extinct flightless bird, the moa.

== Biography ==
McKenzie was born in 1873 to Daniel and Margaret McKenzie.

As a child, McKenzie and her family moved from Hokitika to Jackson Bay in Westland. After that they moved to Jamestown on Lake McKerrow. The township of Jamestown flopped and the McKenzies drifted down to Martins Bay. The hardships and isolation that followed the move are innumerable. McKenzie grew up in these isolated and lonely conditions and later wrote the book The Pioneers of Martins Bay, describing her early life at Martins Bay in the 1870s and 1880s.

The book was first published in 1947 by the Southland Historical Committee, and a revised edition was self-published in 1952. Later in life, McKenzie claimed to have seen a large bird, possibly a moa, on the beach as a child.

She married Peter Mackenzie in 1902. She died in Dunedin on 2 May 1963 at the age of 90.

== Legacy ==
In 2006, the Lakes District Museum in Arrowtown published a new revised edition of Pioneers of Martins Bay.

A 2013 article titled What Alice Saw, written by Don Long and illustrated by Adele Jackson, examines McKenzie’s moa sighting. In 2025, author and illustrator Isaac du Toit published Alice and the Strange Bird, a children's book about McKenzie.

== Bibliography ==
- The Pioneers of Martins Bay (Southland Historical Committee, 1947)
- Poems (1946)
