= Margaret McKenzie =

Margaret McKenzie may refer to:

- Margaret McKenzie (pioneer)
- Margaret McKenzie (politician)
- Margaret McKenzie (rugby union)
