= Samuel Kirkpatrick =

Samuel Kirkpatrick may refer to:

- Samuel Kirkpatrick (businessman) (c.1854–1925), New Zealand businessman
- Samuel A. Kirkpatrick, president of the University of Texas at San Antonio (1990–1999) and Eastern Michigan University (2001–2004)
