= Pūkaha National Wildlife Centre =

New Zealand captive breeding facility

Coordinates: 40.7211°S 175.6399°E

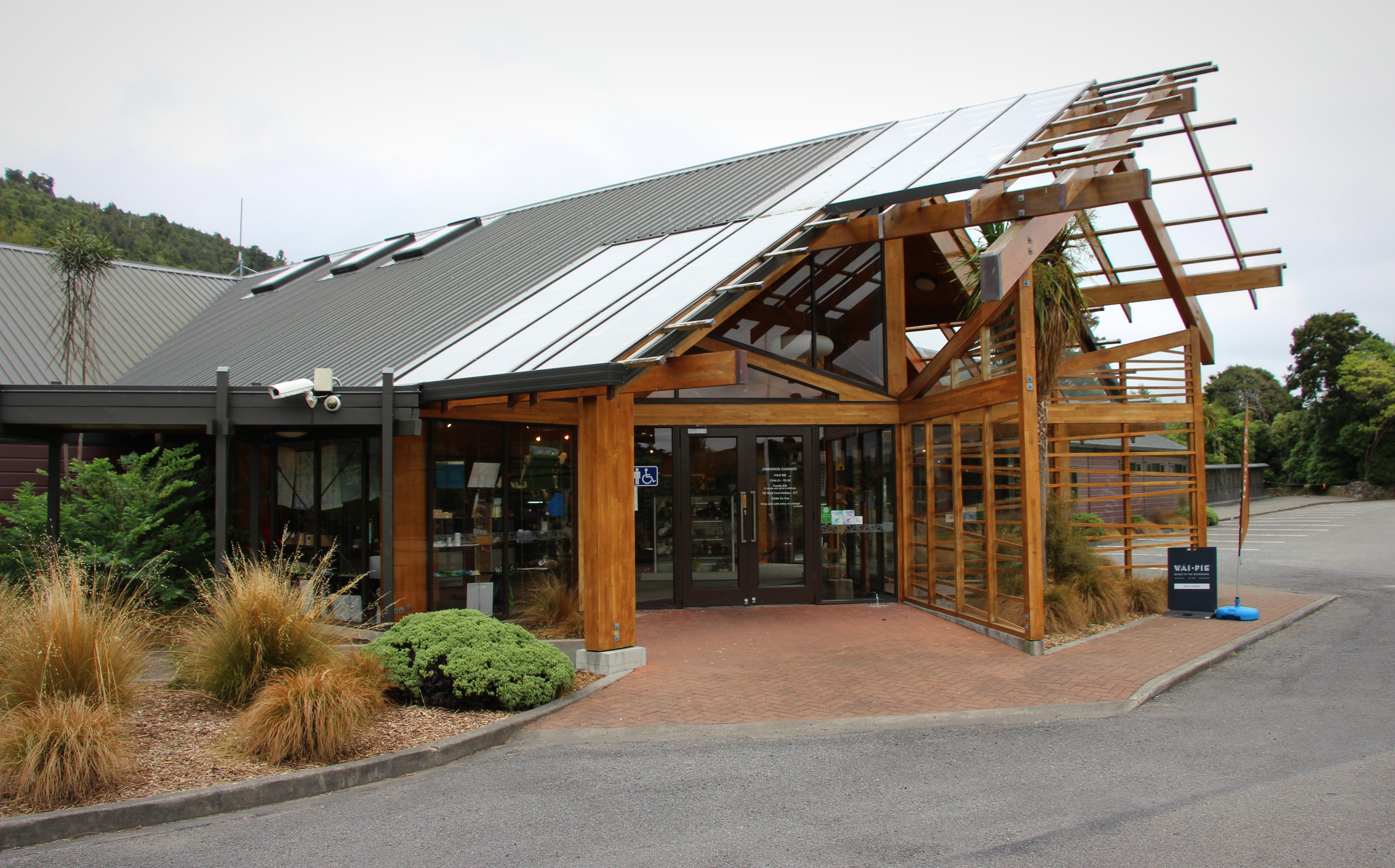
- Interactive map of Pūkaha National Wildlife Centre
- Nearest city: Masterton, New Zealand
- Area: 942 ha (2,330 acres)
- Authorized: 1962
- Governing body: Pūkaha Mount Bruce Board
- Website: pukaha.org.nz

Pūkaha National Wildlife Centre is a captive breeding facility and visitor centre located in a protected forest area on State Highway 2 in New Zealand's Tararua district. It was formerly called Mount Bruce National Wildlife Centre, then Pūkaha / Mount Bruce National Wildlife Centre.

== Location ==
Pūkaha National Wildlife Centre is located on State Highway 2, 30 km north of Masterton and 10 km south of Eketāhuna. It is within the Pukaha / Mount Bruce National Wildlife Centre Reserve, a government purpose reserve that is approximately 57.3 ha in area. The wildlife centre reserve is enclosed on three sides by the larger Pukaha / Mount Bruce Scenic Reserve of 891 ha. These reserves are protected areas under the Reserves Act 1977.

== History ==
The forest was acquired by the government in the 1870s as part of Seventy Mile Bush, which covered the area from Masterton to Central Hawkes Bay before European settlement. Most of the bush was destroyed and converted to farmland, but the 942 hectare Mount Bruce block was protected as a Forest Reserve. In 1900, the Land Board declined a request for the subdivision of around 404 ha (1,000 acres) of the Mount Bruce forest reserve. A further request in 1917 was also declined by the Minister of Lands. In 1958, around 40.5 ha (100 acres) alongside the highway was protected as a Native Bird Reserve, administered by the Wildlife Service.

Local man Elwyn Welch became an expert in captive raising of birds, including endangered birds, leading to successes with South Island takahe (Porphyrio hochstetteri) in the 1950s. In 1962, work began on a facility at Mt Bruce to breed and release endangered native birds. South Island takahe (a very rare bird, thought extinct, but rediscovered in Fiordland) were introduced in 1963. The native bird reserve was officially opened on 27 March 1965. In the same decade, a large number of brown teal, buff weka and kākāriki were released.

In 2001 the entire forest became part of the wildlife reserve, extending the area from 55 to 942 hectares, increasing capacity to breed birds and diversified species. About 100 km of tracks were cut and thousands of traps and bait stations were scattered, setting up an area for wildlife with low predator pressure. The wildlife centre was owned by the National Wildlife Centre Trust until 2006, when Pūkaha Mount Bruce Board replaced the trust.

In 2016 a deed was signed between customary landowners Rangitāne iwi (Rangitāne o Tāmaki Nui ā Rua and Rangitāne o Wairarapa) and the Crown to settle historical claims made under the Treaty of Waitangi. The settlement included adding the Māori name Pūkaha to the names of the Mount Bruce National Wildlife Centre and the Mount Bruce Scenic Reserve. A key part of the settlement was the vesting and gifting back of the reserves. A ceremony to recognise the handover of Pūkaha to Rangitāne was held on site on 8 February 2020. On 1 May 2021, a further ceremony was held to celebrate Rangitāne iwi gifting back Pūkaha forest to the people of Aotearoa New Zealand.

In December 2023 the centres North Island kōkako, named Kahurangi, died. She had been the centre since 2005 as she was too tame for the wild. Kahurangi was the only captive North Island kōkako in the world, was able to wolf-whistle, and had a "penchant for men with beards". The centre and Rangitāne are going to have a farewell.

== Governance and staffing ==
The wildlife centre is operated by the Pūkaha Mount Bruce Board, an incorporated society and registered charity whose trading name is Pūkaha National Wildlife Centre. The constitution of the trust describes a three-way partnership between Rangitāne, the National Wildlife Centre, and the Department of Conservation.

There are currently 30 staff and around 50 volunteers. The team works in various areas including forest regeneration, pest control, the visitor centre, communications, and in the café.

== Purposes ==
=== Conservation ===
Its main objective is to help restore native wildlife. Currently, restoration mostly concerns birds, but also includes reptiles such as the tuatara. Controlling invasive pest populations is an important means to ensuring the successful rejuvenation of native wildlife in the area. Currently Goodnature A24 traps are being used in conjunction with other pest control methods with the aim of bringing the rat, stoat, and possum populations down to reduce the threat these animals pose.

In August 2021, it was announced that the Department of Conservation had committed $700,000 towards the control of rabbits in the area surrounding the scenic reserve, to help reduce the environmental damage they cause, and also reduce the population of ferrets and cats that prey on rabbits, and also threaten birds in the reserve.

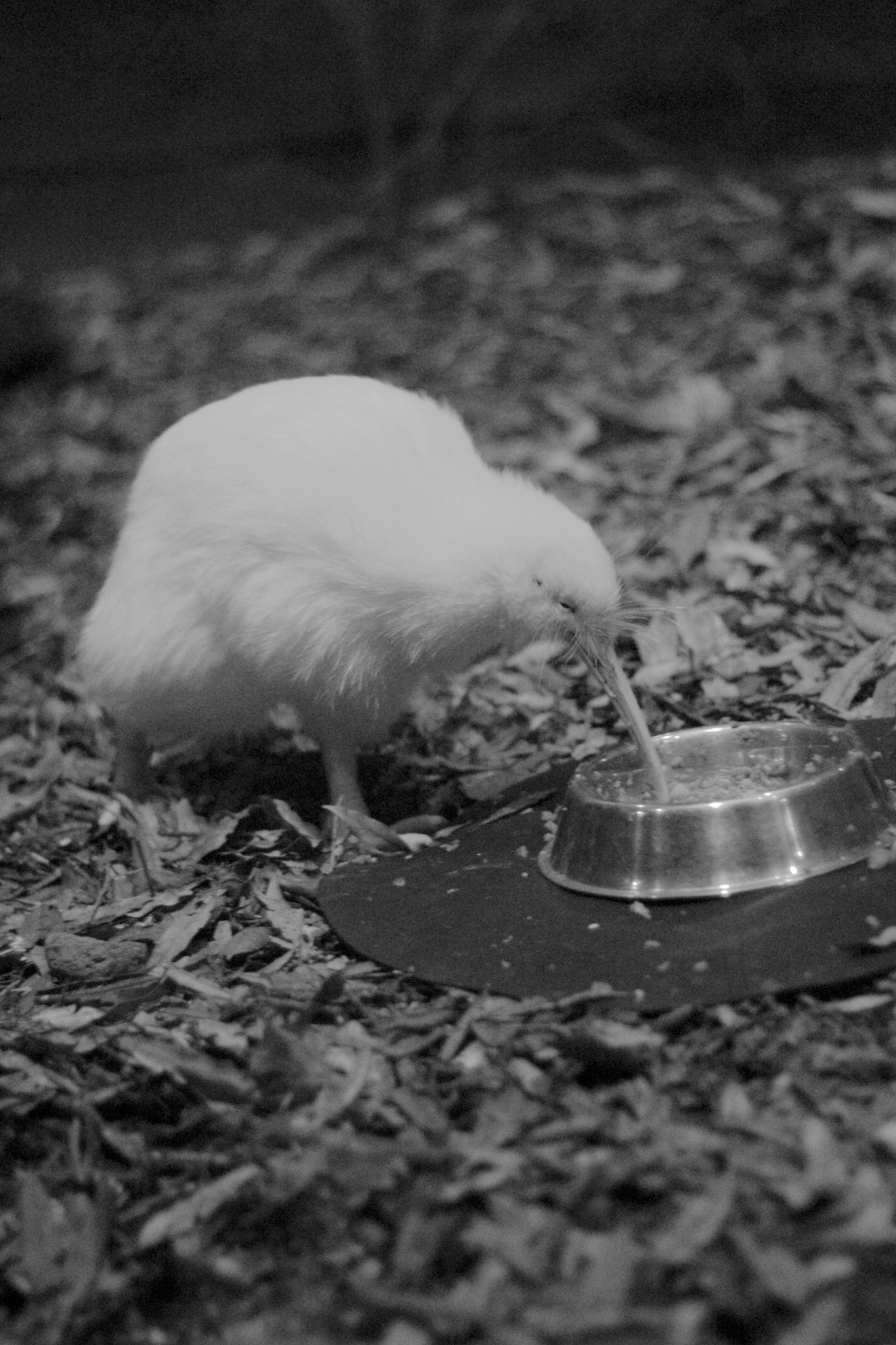
Manukura – the white kiwi

Bird releases started in 1996 with nine kākā, a kind of parrot. There are now approximately 160 kākā in the forest, and the goal is to have a population of 600 in a few years. North Island brown kiwi and North Island kōkako translocations followed in 2003. Over 15 kiwi are currently living in the forest and two in the nocturnal house, including some chicks. For the breeding programme, they incubate kiwi eggs to protect chicks and thus give them the chance to become adult.

=== Tourism ===
The second biggest mission of the centre is welcoming local and international tourists, and to educate them about the environment and wildlife protection including pest control. There are about 40,000 visitors per year. There are several tourist facilities: a café, aviaries to discover the native birds (including a Behind the Scenes tour) and the nocturnal house where they can see the shy kiwi. There are guided visits and a daily feeding demonstrations for kākā and eels. Pūkaha also offers a night tour to look for the kiwi at night and visit the glow worm cave. The centre is closed only on Christmas Day.

A notable attraction was Manukura, a rare white kiwi, the first one hatched in captivity. New Zealand author Joy Cowley wrote a picture story book for children about the white bird. Manukura died following surgery on 27 December 2020, aged 10.

=== Education ===
Many schools visit the centre. Some sponsor a kiwi so they can follow its progress after release into the wild. They participate in the LEOTC (Learning experiences Outside the Classroom) education programme, giving them the chance to see the kiwi and to learn about environmental problems facing New Zealand. Pūkaha is also known for its holiday programmes, giving local children the chance to be a junior ranger.

In 2020, a new conservation training programme was announced by a regional tertiary education provider UCOL, to be taught in conjunction with the centre. The Te Kura Tapere: Certificate in Introductory Conservation is an eight-week course taught on-site at Pūkaha.

Birds at Pūkaha

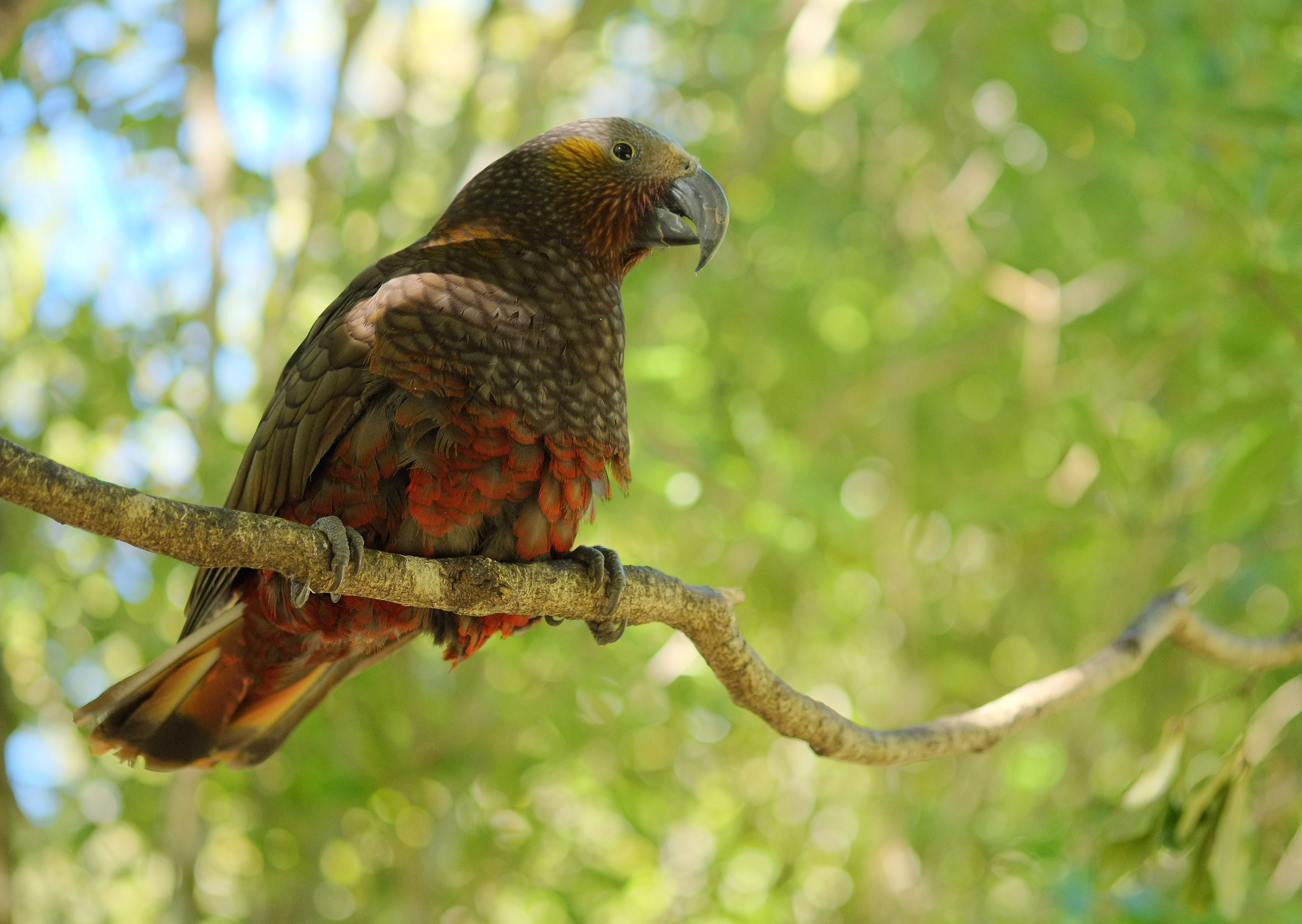
Kākā

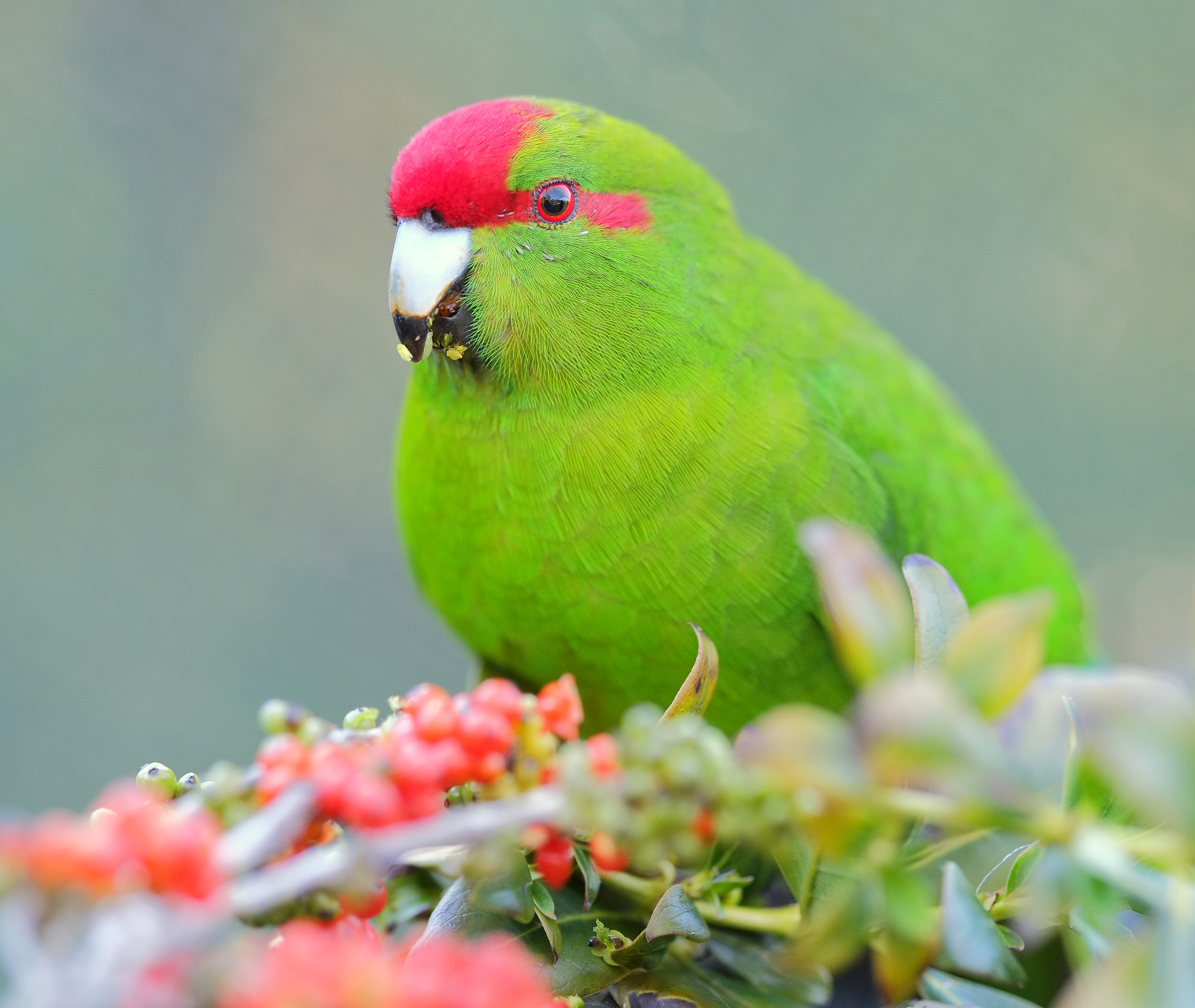
Kākāriki

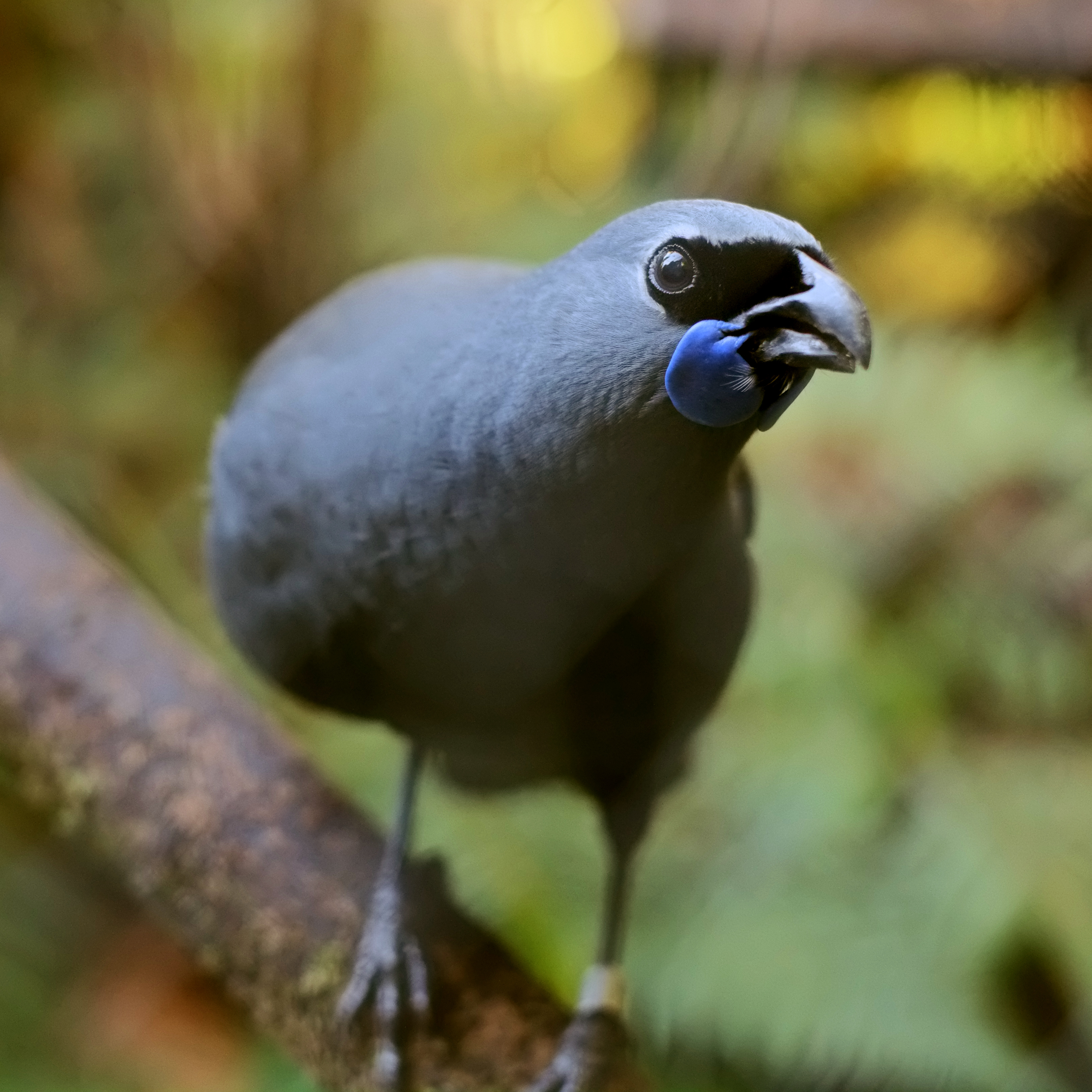
Kōkako

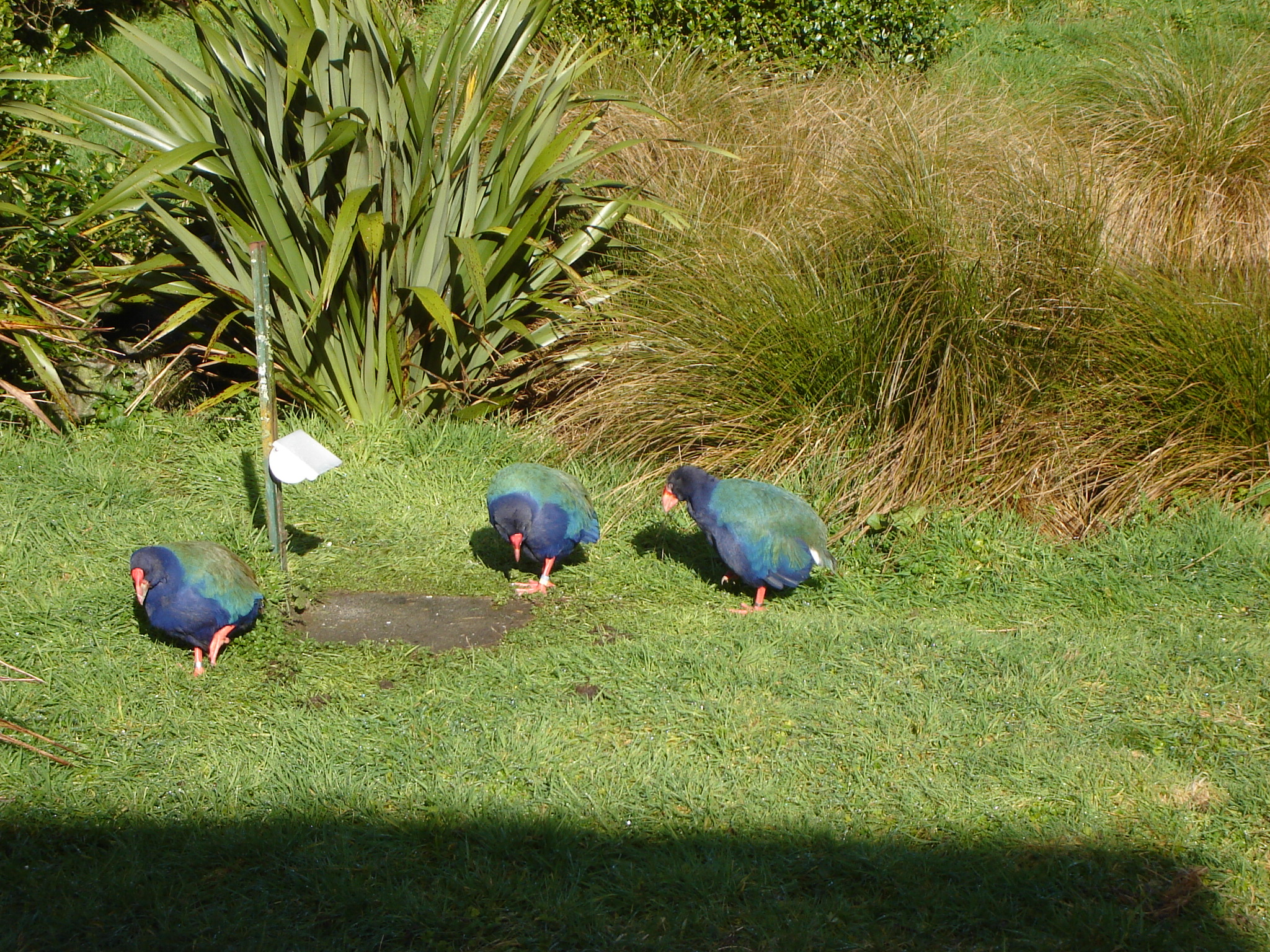
Takahē

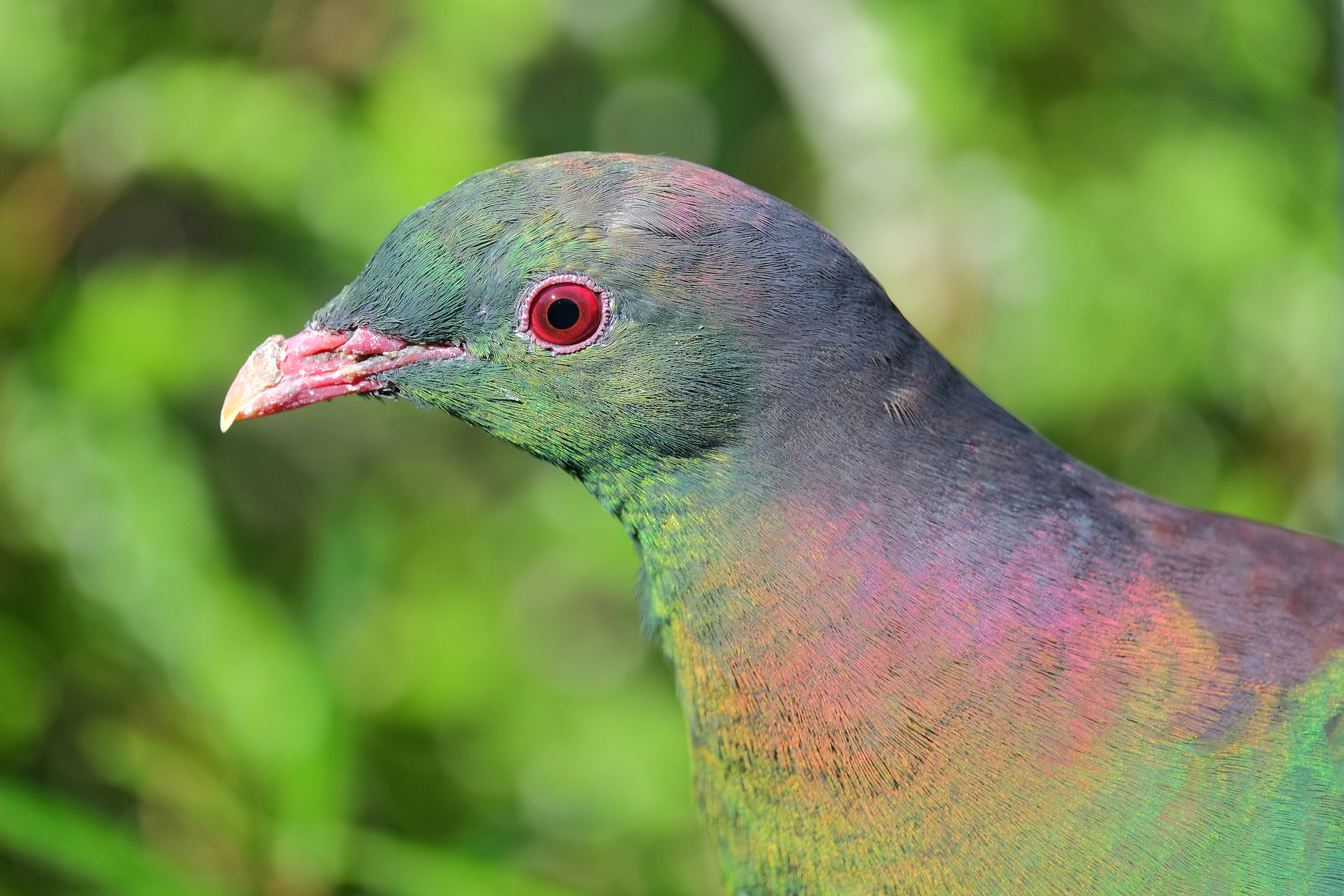
Kererū

== Climate ==
Climate data for Mount Bruce, elevation 305 m (1,001 ft), (1981–2010)
Month	Jan	Feb	Mar	Apr	May	Jun	Jul	Aug	Sep	Oct	Nov	Dec	Year
Mean daily maximum °C (°F)	21.9 (71.4)	22.0 (71.6)	20.0 (68.0)	17.0 (62.6)	14.0 (57.2)	11.6 (52.9)	10.8 (51.4)	11.7 (53.1)	14.1 (57.4)	15.6 (60.1)	17.5 (63.5)	19.6 (67.3)	16.3 (61.4)
Daily mean °C (°F)	16.5 (61.7)	16.4 (61.5)	14.7 (58.5)	12.0 (53.6)	9.7 (49.5)	7.6 (45.7)	6.8 (44.2)	7.5 (45.5)	9.5 (49.1)	11.0 (51.8)	12.7 (54.9)	14.9 (58.8)	11.6 (52.9)
Mean daily minimum °C (°F)	11.1 (52.0)	10.8 (51.4)	9.4 (48.9)	7.0 (44.6)	5.4 (41.7)	3.6 (38.5)	2.8 (37.0)	3.3 (37.9)	4.9 (40.8)	6.4 (43.5)	7.9 (46.2)	10.2 (50.4)	6.9 (44.4)
Average rainfall mm (inches)	133.8 (5.27)	139.1 (5.48)	153.2 (6.03)	137.2 (5.40)	202.1 (7.96)	195.3 (7.69)	208.3 (8.20)	207.1 (8.15)	201.5 (7.93)	186.4 (7.34)	167.1 (6.58)	179.4 (7.06)	2,110.5 (83.09)
Source: NIWA
