= Noeline Brokenshire =

New Zealand field hockey player and hurdler (1925–2022)

Personal information
- Born: Noeline Gourley; 1 December 1925 Dunedin, New Zealand
- Died: 3 April 2022 (aged 96) Christchurch, New Zealand
- Spouse: David Serpell Brokenshire (m. 1954; died 2014)

Sport
- Country: New Zealand
- Sport: Track and field

Achievements and titles
- National finals: 80 m hurdles champion (1945, 1946, 1947, 1948, 1950)

Noeline Brokenshire (née Gourley; 1 December 1925 – 3 April 2022) was a New Zealand sportswoman, who represented her country in field hockey, and as a hurdler at the 1950 British Empire Games. Later she was a gallery owner and noted woodturner, and the founder and publisher of New Zealand's first woodworking magazine, Touch Wood.

== Early life and family ==
Brokenshire was born Noeline Gourley in Dunedin on 1 December 1925. She was educated at Avonside Girls' High School in Christchurch, and went on to study at Canterbury University College from 1944 to 1945 and then the University of Otago from 1948 to 1950, gaining a Diploma of Physical Education in 1951. In 1954 she married architect and potter David Serpell Brokenshire, and the couple went on to have three children.

== Sporting career ==
=== Cricket ===
A right-handed batsman, Gourley played for the Canterbury women's cricket team during the 1942–1943 season.

=== Hockey ===
Gourley represented the New Zealand women's national field hockey team in 1948, and was a member of the Otago provincial side.

=== Athletics ===
A hurdler, Gourley won the New Zealand national 80 m hurdles title on five occasions: in consecutive years from 1945 to 1948, and in 1950. She represented New Zealand at the 1950 British Empire Games in Auckland, competing in the 80 metre hurdles. In the final she finished in fourth place, behind the Australian winner, Shirley Strickland, and New Zealand teammates June Schoch and Janet Shackleton.

=== Honours ===
Gourley was awarded university blues for athletics and hockey.

== Career ==
=== Teaching ===
Brokenshire was a teacher at Columba College in Dunedin, Christchurch Girls' High School, and Avonside Girls' High School. She was also a lecturer in the School of Physical Education at the University of Otago.

=== Woodturning and writing ===
Brokenshire's husband, David, turned from his original career of architecture to pottery, and Noeline became a woodturner. They both became members of the New Zealand chapter of the World Crafts Council, and held their first joint exhibition of pottery and turned wood in Christchurch in 1966. Noeline Brokenshire exhibited her work widely in New Zealand, including at the New Zealand Academy of Fine Arts in Wellington, a joint exhibition of wood and pottery with Peter Stichbury in Dunedin in 1972, and a combined show with her husband and weaver Karin Wakely in Christchurch in 1969. Her work, which "very sensitively" wedded form to grain, was generally of domestic size and utility.

In 1983, Brokenshire established New Zealand's first woodworking magazine, Touch Wood, which she owned and edited. She solicited articles from subscribers, but researched and wrote much of the content herself. In her editorials in the magazine, which was published three times a year, Brokenshire was a strong advocate for design, professionalism, and a national organisation for woodworkers. Brokenshaw sold Touch Wood in March 1988 after 14 issues, and the magazine was transformed by its new owner into The New Zealand Woodworker with a focus more on trade than craft. It survived until 1991. Brokenshire later wrote Fired clay: the story of the Canterbury Potters' Association, 1870–1989, published in 2000.

In 1986, the Association of Designers and Furniture Makers New Zealand was formed, and Brokenshire was its inaugural secretary.

=== Gallery owner ===
Brokenshire opened Cave Rock Gallery in Sumner in 1987, and it moved to the Christchurch Arts Centre the following year. From November 1990, she operated the Salamander Gallery, also in the Christchurch Arts Centre.

== Later life and death ==
Brokenshire was widowed by the death of her husband, David, on 26 April 2014. She died in Christchurch on 3 April 2022, at the age of 96.
