= Allan Burnett =

Scottish anarchist (1925–2007)

Allan Burnett (12 January 1925 in Glasgow – 10 October 2007 in New Zealand) was a Scottish anarchist activist. He was a member of the Glasgow Anarchist Federation in his youth. When, in 1943, he resisted conscription to the British forces during the Second World War, he was sent to Glasgow's Barlinnie Prison and later to Slateford Prison, Edinburgh as one of 61.000 British conscientious objectors. At his trial at Glasgow Sheriff Court he said that “I refuse to be pitchforked or led into slaughter, like so much human manure, or to be duped into the lunatic butchery of my comrades and fellow workers of other geographical spheres who are like-wise enslaved in a system of organized misery imposed on them by their respective ruling classes.”

After his prison sentence he moved to London and spent time in a number of communes. He also travelled to France and Italy. Shortly after his marriage, he moved to New Zealand where he lived for the rest of his life, never returning to Scotland.

== New Zealand ==
Prior to moving to New Zealand Burnett worked as a shipwright and insurance clerk. In New Zealand he initially worked as a shipping clerk and a bank officer before running his own business in the building trade. In the 1970s he was employed by Auckland City Council as a housing inspector. He was active in the Worker's Educational Association and held the association's public speaking trophy in the mid-1970s. Throughout his life he wrote poetry, the subjects of which ranged from politics, in particular his libertarianism, to his love of the outdoors. He died on 10 October 2007.

Allan Burnett's writing remains unpublished. Some of his work, letters to friends and family, photos, poems and other documents pertaining to his life are archived by the Spirit of Revolt Archive, Glasgow.
