= Pixie Fletcher =

New Zealand hurdler

Personal information
- Born: 21 February 1931
- Died: 29 January 1961 (aged 29) Palmerston North, New Zealand

Sport
- Country: New Zealand
- Sport: Track and field
- Event: Hurdles

Jessica Mary "Pixie" Fletcher (21 February 1931 – 29 July 1961) was a New Zealand hurdler who represented her country at the 1950 British Empire Games.

== Biography ==
Fletcher was born on 21 February 1931, the only child of George and Thelma Fletcher. She excelled at sports, and held Wellington athletics centre records for both the 80 metres hurdles and the discus throw. She was also a provincial netball representative player.

At the 1950 New Zealand national athletic championships, held in Napier in January, which doubled as the New Zealand trials for the 1950 British Empire Games, Fletcher finished third in the women's 80 metres hurdles final, and third in the women's discus throw with a best distance of 94 feet 9 1/4 inches (28.89 m). She was subsequently selected for the New Zealand team for the Empire Games, to compete in the 80 metres hurdles; the discus throw was not a women's event at those games.

In the 80 metres hurdles at the Empire Games, Fletcher placed second in her heat in a time of 11.9 seconds, and progressed to the final, where she finished fifth.

From 1950 to 1955, Fletcher was a member of the Wellington representative netball team at the national championships. She was a schoolteacher, and after moving to work in Waikanae, she played for Horowhenua at the 1957 national netball championships. She subsequently became a netball coach.

Fletcher died in Palmerston North on 29 July 1961, aged 30, after a long illness, and was buried at Kelvin Grove Cemetery.
