= Ray Forster =

New Zealand entomologist and museum director

- Born: 19 June 1922; Hastings, New Zealand
- Died: 1 July 2000 (aged 78); Dunedin, New Zealand
- Spouse: Lyn Forster (m. 1948)
- Scientific career
- Fields: Arachnology

Raymond Robert Forster QSO (19 June 1922 – 1 July 2000) was a New Zealand arachnologist and museum director. He was a Fellow of The Entomological Society of New Zealand.

== Biography ==
Forster was born in Hastings, New Zealand in 1922, and was educated at Victoria University College, gaining BSc, MSc(Hons) and DSc degrees.

Forster was an entomologist at the National Museum in Wellington from 1940 to 1947, with an interruption for military service during World War II. Between 1942 and 1945 he served first in the army and then as a naval radar mechanic. He was appointed zoologist and assistant director at Canterbury Museum in 1948. Forster was one of the zoologists studying invertebrates on the 1949 New Zealand American Fiordland Expedition. He was a marine biologist on the 1954 Chatham Islands expedition. In 1957, Forster moved to Otago Museum to take up the position of director. He retired from that role in 1987.

Forster wrote his first paper on spiders at the age of 17. Over the course of his career, more than 100 scientific papers and volumes were published bearing his name, including the definitive six-volume Spiders of New Zealand, in co-authorship with international colleagues. He also published Small Land Animals and co-authored NZ Spiders, An Introduction. Much of his work was accomplished in collaboration with his wife, Lyn Forster, a notable New Zealand arachnologist.

He researched and classified many of New Zealand's native spiders, and was responsible for establishing Otago Museum's spider collection.

Forster died in Dunedin in 2000.

== Honours ==
In 1961, Forster was elected a Fellow of the Royal Society of New Zealand, and received two of that society's honours: the Hutton Medal in 1971; and the Hector Medal in 1983.

The University of Otago honoured Forster with the award of the degree of Doctor of Science, honoris causa, in 1978.

Forster was awarded the Queen Elizabeth II Silver Jubilee Medal in 1977, and was appointed a Companion of the Queen's Service Order for public services in the 1984 New Year Honours.

Forster was also elected a Fellow of the Entomological Society of New Zealand.

== Honorific eponym ==
A small valley in Fiordland, Forster Burn, is named after him.
