= Beeny =

Coordinates: 50.70075°N 4.67022°W

Beeny: Cornish: Bydhyni
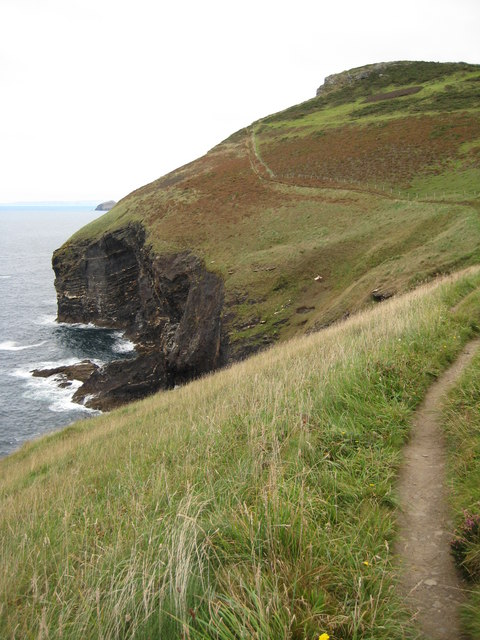
- Beeny Cliff

- Location within Cornwall
- OS grid reference: SX1192
- Shire county: Cornwall
- Region: South West
- Country: England
- Sovereign state: United Kingdom
- Post town: BOSCASTLE
- Postcode district: PL35
- Police: Devon and Cornwall
- Fire: Cornwall
- Ambulance: South Western

Beeny (Cornish: Bydhyni) is a hamlet in north Cornwall, UK. It lies in a sheltered valley near the coast two miles (3 km) northeast of Boscastle.

== Literary allusions ==
Very specifically there is a poem by Thomas Hardy, perhaps better known for his prose works.

Beeny Cliff

March 1870 - March 1913

O the opal and the sapphire of that wandering western sea

And the woman riding high above with bright hair flapping free -

The woman who I loved so, and who loyally loved me.

The pale mews plained below us, and the waves seemed far away

In a nether sky, engrossed in saying their ceaseless babbling say,

As we laughed light-heartedly aloft on that clear-sunned March day.

A little cloud then cloaked us, and there flew an irised rain.

And the Atlantic dyed its levels with a dull misfeatured stain,

And then the sun burst out again, and purples prinked the main.

- Still in all its chasmal beauty bulks old Beeny to the sky,

And shall she and I not go there once again now March is nigh,

And the sweet things said in that March say anew there by and by?

What if still in chasmal beauty looms that wild weird western shore,

The woman now is - elsewhere - whom the ambling pony bore,

And nor knows nor cares for Beeny, and will laugh there nevermore.

Further, in "A Death-Day Recalled," collected in Satires of Circumstance (1914), Thomas Hardy wrote:

Beeny did not quiver,

Juliot grew not gray,
Thin Vallency's river
Held its wonted way.
Bos seemed not to utter
Dimmest note of dirge,
Targan mouth a mutter
To its creamy surge.

Yet though these, unheeding,
Listless, passed the hour
Of her spirit's speeding,
She had, in her flower,
Sought and loved the places
Much and often pined
For their lonely faces
When in towns confined.

Why did not Vallency
In his purl deplore
One whose haunts were whence he
Drew his limpid store?
Why did Bos not thunder,
Targan apprehend
Body and Breath were sunder

Of their former friend?

It begins with an idealised celebration of the young Emma's beauty, as first encountered at Beeny; before switching decades on to the present and her permanent absence. Hardy used the waves, "engrossed in saying their ceaseless babbling say" (l. 5) that crashed against the cliff, as a metaphor for time, which moves forward mechanically, routinely, and without any concern for people. In the poem, Hardy is again on the cliff where he and Emma had once stood, and the landscape is the same, but the waves—or time—has taken Emma to a place where she no longer "cares for Beeny, and will laugh there nevermore" (l. 15).

== Notable residents ==
- Henry Chidley Reynolds (1849–1925), a New Zealand farm manager, butter manufacturer and exporter, was born at Beeny.
