= Lyn Forster =

New Zealand arachnologist, university lecturer, editor and non-fiction writer

- Born: Lyndsay McLaren Clifford; 19 September 1925; Wallaceville, New Zealand
- Died: 20 January 2009 (aged 83); Mosgiel, New Zealand
- Education: University of Otago
- Spouse: Ray Forster (m. 1948; died 2000)
- Children: 4
- Scientific career
- Fields: Arachnology
- Workplaces: University of Otago
- Thesis: Comparative aspects of the behavioural biology of some New Zealand jumping spiders (1979)

Lyndsay McLaren Forster (née Clifford; 19 September 1925 – 20 January 2009) was a New Zealand arachnologist.

== Biography ==
Forster was born in Upper Hutt and grew up on a small farm near Feilding. She enrolled at Victoria University College in Wellington but moved to Christchurch in 1948 without completing her degree. She moved again to Dunedin in 1957; in the late 1960s she returned to her university studies and eventually completed a PhD at the University of Otago in 1979.

Forster was a lecturer in zoology at the University of Otago, and also carried out research and wrote papers and books on spiders. Her work focused on jumping spiders, and on white-tailed spiders and Australian redback spiders. In addition, she worked at the Otago Museum designing and creating displays of spiders, and running educational programmes on spiders for children.

Forster was also an active member of the Otago Institute (the Otago branch of the Royal Society of New Zealand); in 1990 she was elected president, the first woman to hold the position.

== Personal life ==
In 1948 Forster married fellow scientist Ray Forster. The couple had four children together.

== Publications ==
- Forster, Raymond R.; Forster, L. M. (1973). New Zealand spiders. Auckland: Collins. ISBN 978-0-00-211565-0.
- Forster, Raymond R.; Forster, L. M. (1974). Small land animals of New Zealand (revised ed.). Dunedin: J. McIndoe.
- Forster, Raymond R.; Forster, L. M. (1999). Spiders of New Zealand and their world-wide kin. Dunedin: University of Otago Press in association with Otago Museum. ISBN 978-1-877133-79-4.
