= Donald Brian (cricketer) =

New Zealand cricketer

Personal information
- Full name: Donald Eric Brian
- Born: 25 October 1925; Lower Hutt, New Zealand
- Died: 17 November 2015 (aged 90); Hawke's Bay, New Zealand
- Source: ESPNcricinfo, 28 June 2016

Donald Brian (25 October 1925 – 17 November 2015) was a New Zealand cricketer. He played first-class cricket for Central Districts and Wellington between 1946 and 1956.
