= Henry Chidley Reynolds =

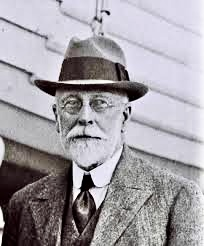
- Born: May 26, 1849; Beeny, St Juliot, Cornwall, England.
- Died: September 19, 1925 (aged 76); Honor Oak Park, England
- Occupations: Farm manager manufacturer
- Known for: Anchor

Henry Chidley Reynolds (26 May 1849 – 19 September 1925) was a New Zealand farm manager, butter manufacturer and exporter. He was born at Beeny, St Juliot, Cornwall, England, in 1849. He began manufacturing butter in 1886 and soon adopted "Anchor" as a brand name. After his butter won an award at the Centennial International Exhibition in Melbourne he began exporting butter to England. Because of financial difficulties he sold his business to the New Zealand Dairy Association in 1896 and the association adopted the "Anchor" brand. Most of the Pukekura factory was demolished in 1981, leaving only a storage shed, but the site is marked by 2 roadside plaques.

His parents were William and Elizabeth (née Chidley) Reynolds. On 15 April 1879 he married Elizabeth, daughter of Captain William Steele (1831-98) He set up the butter factory with his brother, Richard (1853-1928). In 1903 he was running a butter factory at Tandil and set up River Plate Dairy Company. He died, aged 76, of heart failure at Honor Oak Park station and was survived by Dorothy Kathleen, his daughter, William, his son, and his wife. Elizabeth died on 6 October 1936 at Santos, or possibly in Argentina.
