= Ray Bell =

New Zealand rugby union player

- Born: Raymond Henry Bell; 31 December 1925 Dunedin, New Zealand
- Died: 19 July 2016 (aged 90) Dunedin, New Zealand
- Height: 1.83 m (6 ft 0 in)
- Weight: 86 kg (190 lb)
- School: King's High School

Rugby union career
- Position(s): Wing; Fullback
Provincial / State sides
Years	Team	Apps	(Points)
1945, 1949–52	Otago		
International career
Years	Team	Apps	(Points)
1951–52	New Zealand	3	(6)

Raymond Henry "Ray" Bell (31 December 1925 – 19 July 2016) was a New Zealand rugby union player. A wing and fullback, Bell represented Otago at a provincial level and was a member of the New Zealand national side, the All Blacks, from 1951 to 1952. He played nine matches for the All Blacks including three internationals. Later, he served as an Otago selector from 1968 to 1971.

Bell served with J Force, the New Zealand occupying force in Japan, from 1946 to 1948. He died in Dunedin on 19 July 2016.
