= David Brokenshire =

New Zealand potter (1925–2014)

- Born: David Serpell Brokenshire; 28 April 1925; Thames, New Zealand
- Died: 26 April 2014 (aged 88); Christchurch, New Zealand
- Education: Auckland University College
- Known for: Architecture, pottery
- Spouse: Noeline Gourley (m. 1954)

David Serpell Brokenshire (28 April 1925 – 26 April 2014) was a New Zealand architect and potter.

== Early life and family ==
Born in Thames on 28 April 1925, Brokenshire was the son of Albert Thomas Brokenshire, a plumber, and Elvira Margaret Brokenshire (née Serpell). He was educated at Thames High School, and entered the RNZAF in 1943, and saw active service in the Pacific, attaining the rank of flying officer in 1945. In 1954 he married Noeline Gourley, an athlete who had represented New Zealand in the 80 m hurdles at the 1950 British Empire Games. The couple went on to have three children.

== Architecture ==
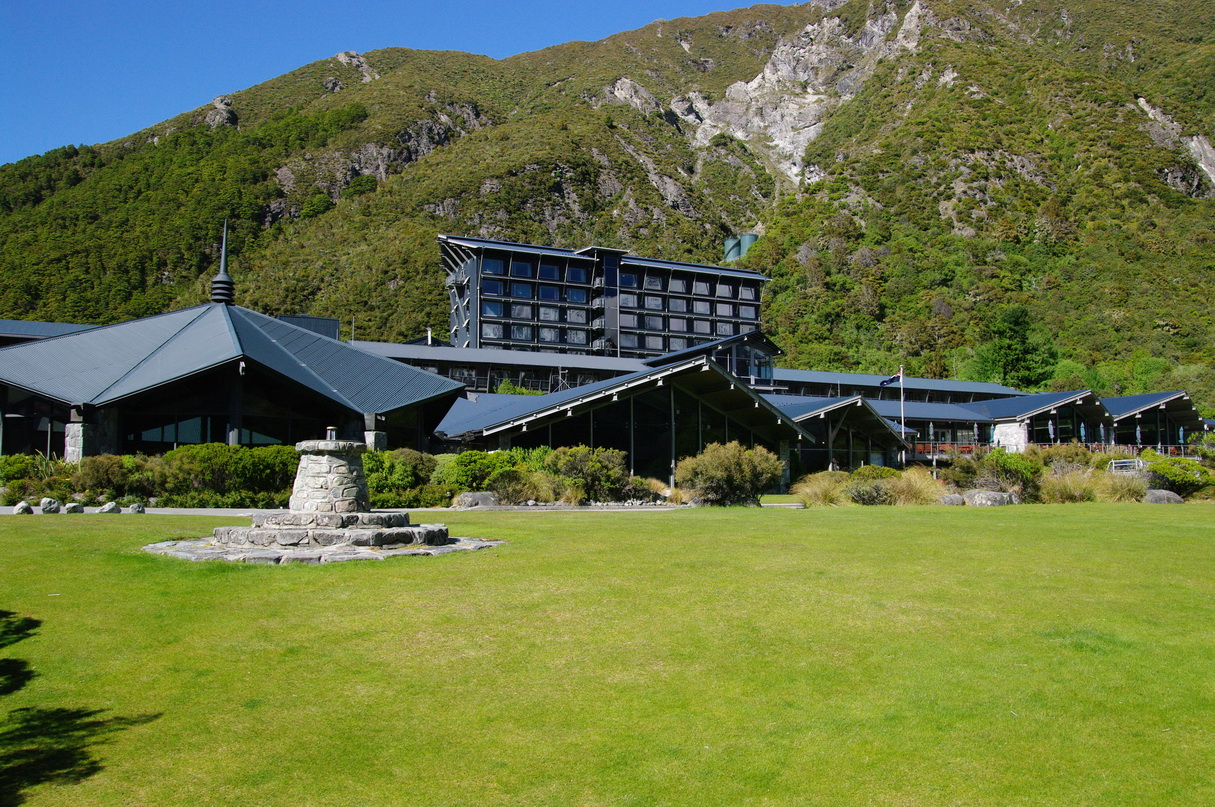
The Hermitage Hotel, Mount Cook Village, with the octagonal "Panorama Room" restaurant on left

In 1946, he began studying architecture at the Auckland University College School of Architecture, graduating in 1951. He worked briefly for the Christchurch City Council before working with Dunedin firm Miller, White and Dunn on buildings at the University of Otago. He then moved to Christchurch-based architects Hall and Mackenzie, where he worked on the new Hermitage Hotel at Mount Cook Village, notably designing its octagonal restaurant, and various buildings for the new Ilam campus of the University of Canterbury, including the registry.

== Pottery ==
He started working with pottery in 1951, alongside his wife Noeline, and became a full-time potter in 1979. He began potting by throwing on a wheel but following a workshop with Patricia Perrin in the early 1960s, who was teaching a hammer and anvil technique using large-scale coils, Brokenshire began making work through hand building. Hand building suited Brokenshire's architectural background, enabling him to build a piece steadily to whatever scale he desired. Brokenshire also incorporated Māori motifs into his work, including modelling some pieces on Māori anchor stones.

His work is held in the Museum of New Zealand Te Papa Tongarewa, the Christchurch Art Gallery Te Puna o Waiwhetu, and the International Museum of Ceramics in Faenza, Italy.

Brokenshire served as vice president of the New Zealand Society of Potters, and was an art critic for The Press newspaper in Christchurch from 1980 to 1984.
