= John Liddell Kelly =

British journalist and poet

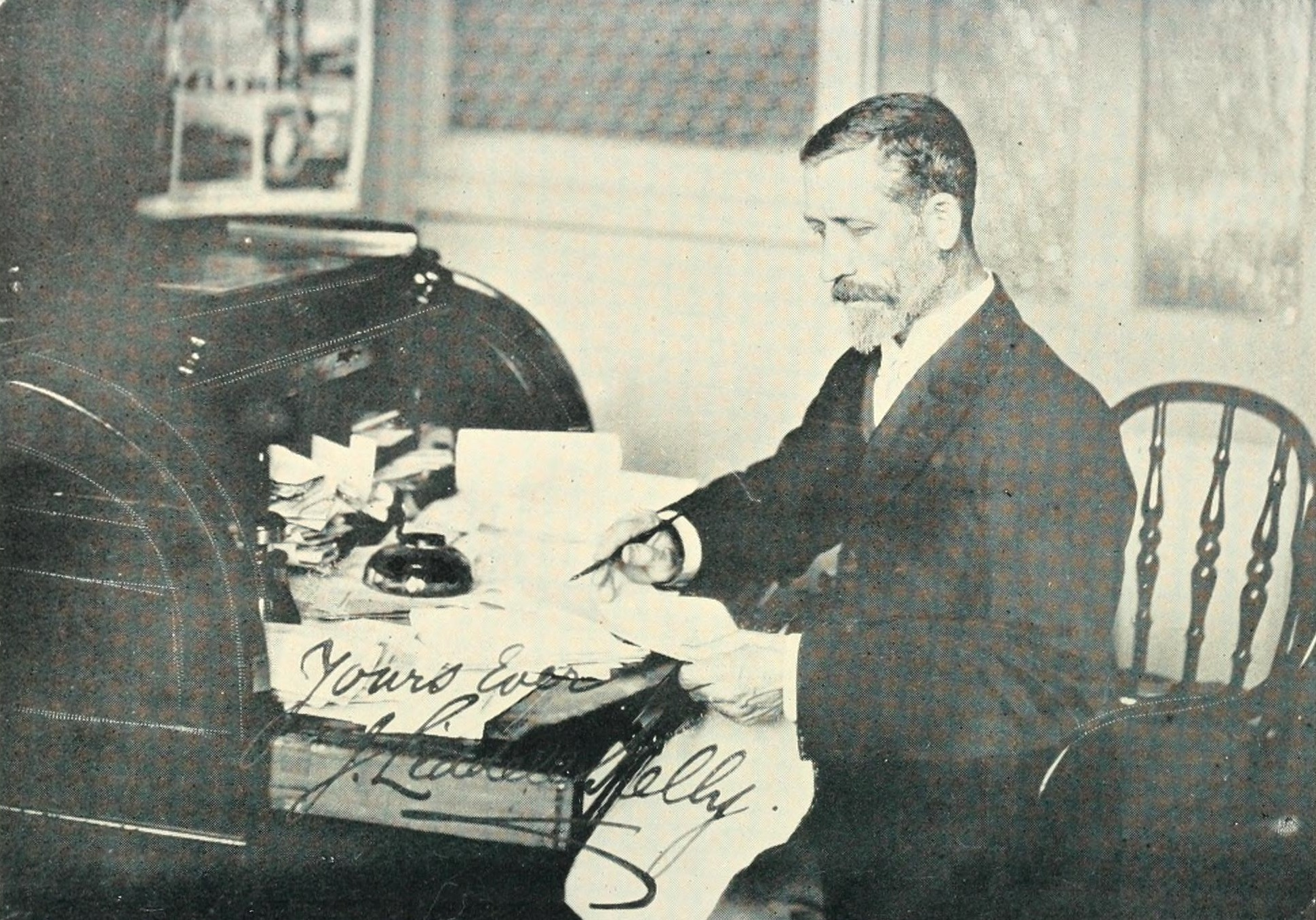
John Liddell Kelly.

John Liddell Kelly (19 February 1850 – 10 December 1925) was a British journalist and poet.

== Biography ==
Born near Airdrie, Scotland, Kelly left school at the age of eleven and was self-educated afterwards. He married in 1870 and emigrated to New Zealand in 1880 on account of his health. In New Zealand he served as sub-editor for the Auckland Star and wrote humorous verses for the Auckland Observer. He also worked for the Lyttelton Times and the New Zealand Times.

== Works ==
- (1885). Tahiti, the Land of Love and Beauty.
- (1887). Tarawera, or the Curse of Tuhoto.
- (1890). Zealandia's Jubilee.
- (1902). Heather and Fern.
