= Catherine Adamson =

New Zealand diarist

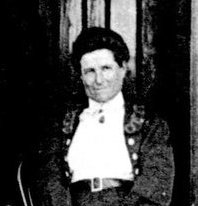
- Adamson on the verandah of Volis Station homestead, Whataroa
- Born: Catherine Mary Ann Friend; 13 October 1868; Fitzroy, Victoria, Australia
- Died: 9 August 1925 (aged 56); Hokitika, New Zealand
- Occupations: Homemaker; farmer; diarist
- Years active: 1895–1906
- Known for: Diaries of farming life in the Westland District of New Zealand
- Spouse: Robert Adamson (m. 1888)
- Children: 5

Catherine Mary Ann Adamson (née Friend, 13 October 1868 – 9 August 1925) was a New Zealand homemaker, farmer and diarist. Her diaries, which she wrote from 1895 to 1906, are a rare historic record of pioneer life in the Westland District of New Zealand.

== Early life ==
Adamson was born in Fitzroy, Victoria, Australia, on 13 October 1868. Her parents were Samuel Friend, a labourer, and Ann Elizabeth Langham. When she was a baby, the family travelled to New Zealand and settled in Ōkārito, then the centre of commerce of Westland.

On 23 September 1888, she married Robert Adamson, a farmer, butcher and flax-miller. His family owned land in the Whataroa area.

== Life in Westland ==
Adamson and her husband farmed Volis Station, a large forested block, which required a great deal of work to convert it into farmland. Her diaries recorded the work undertaken by the whole family such as churning butter for sale to local miners, catching whitebait, clearing bush and droving cattle. A typical entry would be "Self and children weeding all day long". She only briefly mentioned her own personal feelings and experiences; on the day of a son's birth in 1899 she made a record of the work being done on the farm by the men. In 1901 her son became ill and died. She wrote in her diary: "my Darling's funeral took place ... Family all came home leaving our Darling in God's world". Another of her children died in 1906. In her diary she records visiting her child's grave to plant trees and shrubs.

Adamson's life was hard and isolated, and she was supported by her female friends living throughout South Westland. The family made regular visits to Ōkārito, where her parents owned the Royal Hotel, and occasionally travelled to Hokitika. In 1901 she and her husband travelled around the North Island.

Adamson died on 9 August 1925 at Westland Hospital, Hokitika, and was buried in the Whataroa cemetery. Her husband died in 1941 and was buried with her. Her diaries were published in 1998.
