= Philip Liner =

New Zealand broadcaster (1925–2019)

- Born: Philip John Liner; 2 July 1925; Northampton, Northamptonshire, England
- Died: 19 April 2019 (aged 93); Wellington, New Zealand
- Occupation: Broadcaster
- Spouse: Jean Hardwick (m. 1947)
- Children: 1

Philip John Liner (2 July 1925 – 19 April 2019) was a New Zealand broadcaster on National Radio for more than 20 years.

== Biography ==
Born in Northampton, Northamptonshire, England, on 2 July 1925, Liner was the son of George Herbert Liner and Marion Emma Liner (née Edwards). In 1947, he married Jean Hardwick in Northampton, and the couple went on to have one child.

After migrating to New Zealand in the 1960s, Liner joined the New Zealand Broadcasting Corporation (later Radio New Zealand) in 1968, and worked with that broadcaster as a presenter on National Radio until his retirement in 1990. He was most closely associated with the drive time programme Roundabout, on which he interviewed New Zealanders from all walks of life.

Liner died in the Wellington suburb of Johnsonville on 19 April 2019.
