= Don Long (writer) =

New Zealand writer (born 1950)

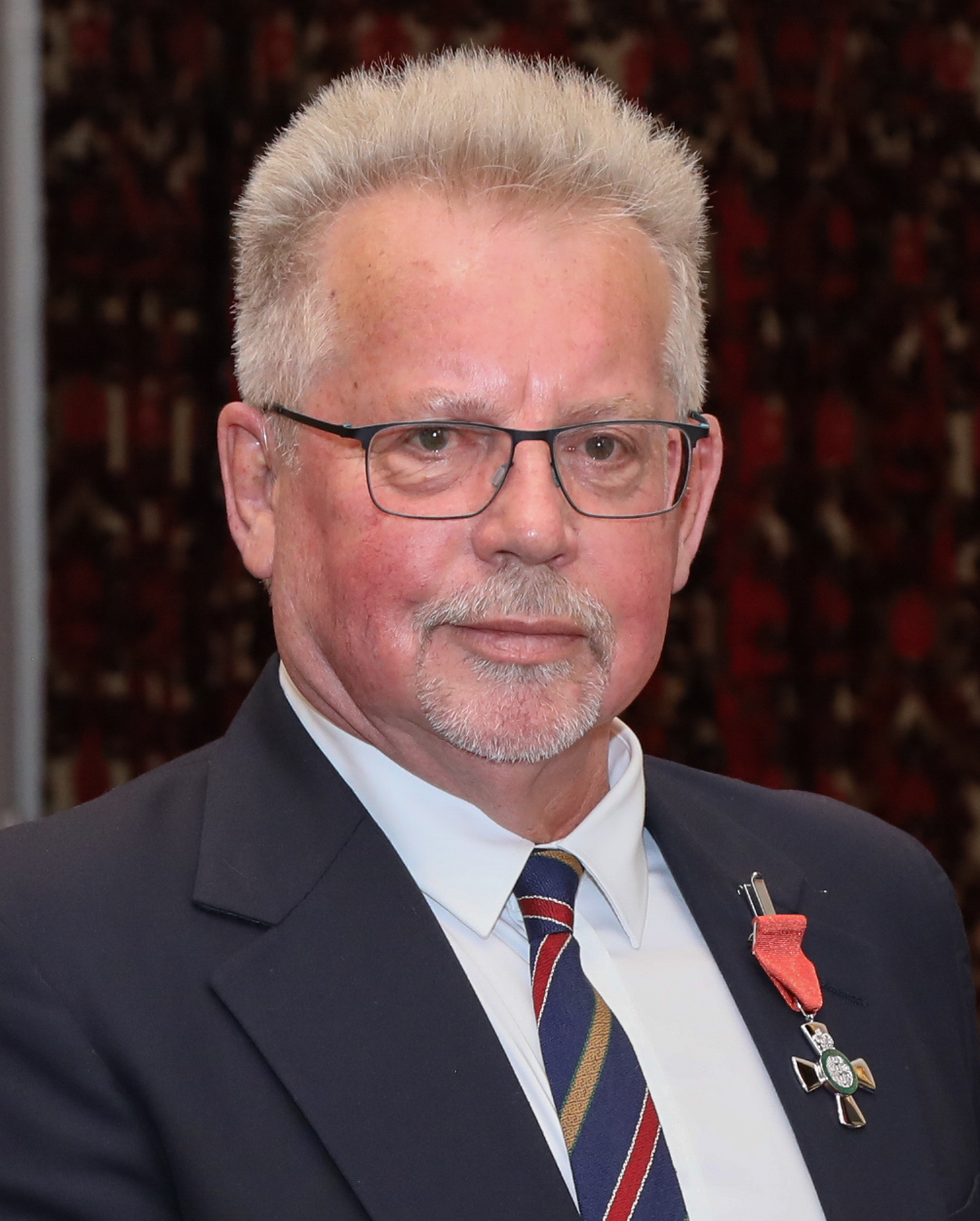
Long in 2020

Donald Stuart Long MNZM (born 5 January 1950), also known as D.S. Long, is a New Zealand writer, poet and publisher.

In the 2020 Queen's Birthday Honours, Long was appointed a Member of the New Zealand Order of Merit, for services to literature and education, particularly Pacific language education. He was a judge for the New Zealand Book Awards for Children and Young Adults in 2025.
