= John Sinclair (New Zealand carpenter) =

New Zealander carpenter (1843–1925)

John Sinclair (18 September 1843 – 18 July 1925) was a notable New Zealand carpenter, builder, station manager and harbourmaster. He was born in Olrig, Caithness, Scotland in 1843.
