= Janet Shackleton =

New Zealand hurdler (1928–2021)

Janet Cooke
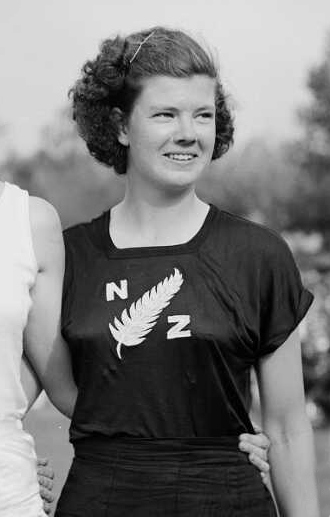
- Shackleton at the 1950 British Empire Games

Personal information
- Born: Janet Park Shackleton; 10 July 1928
- Died: 17 May 2021 (aged 92) Wellington, New Zealand
- Spouse: John Humphrey Cooke (m. 1953; died 2013)

Sport
- Country: New Zealand
- Sport: Athletics
- Event: 80 m hurdles

Achievements and titles
- Personal best: 11.4 (1950)
Medal record
Representing New Zealand
Commonwealth Games
Bronze medal – third place	1950 Auckland	80 m hurdles

Janet Park Cooke (née Shackleton; 10 July 1928 – 17 May 2021) was a New Zealand hurdler. At the 1950 British Empire Games, as Janet Shackleton, she won the bronze medal in the 80 metres hurdles.

In 1953, she married John Humphrey Cooke at Waimate, and the couple went on to have four children. In the late 1950s, they purchased the 8,000-acre (3,200 ha) Big Ben Station near the Rakaia Gorge, where they farmed sheep and cattle. In 1991, Janet and John Cooke retired to Akaroa, before moving to Greenpark near Lincoln, and then Wellington, where John Cooke died in 2013. Janet Cooke died in Wellington on 17 May 2021.
