= Spirit of Revolt Archive =

Archive in Glasgow, Scotland

- Interactive map of Spirit of Revolt Archive
- 55°51′54.39″N 4°16′19.23″W
- Location: North Street, Charing Cross, Glasgow, Scotland
- Type: Community archive
- Established: August 2011; 14 years ago
- Affiliation: National Records of Scotland

Building information
- Building: Mitchell Library

The Spirit of Revolt Archive, based in Glasgow, Scotland, is dedicated to collecting, managing and preserving multi-media records from Glasgow’s and Clydeside’s anarchist and libertarian-socialist movement. It is a ‘community archive’, largely run by volunteers. It was constituted in August 2011 and today forms part of Glasgow City Archives’ collection whilst maintaining its organisational independence. Its catalogue will join the National Records of Scotland in 2013. The archive derives its name from the title of an 1880 pamphlet by the Russian anarchist Peter Kropotkin. The archive’s digitised documents are hosted on www.archive.org.

For its initial scoping and start-up phase, Spirit of Revolt Archive was funded by the Barry Amiel and Norman Melburn Trust which seeks to ‘advance public education, learning and knowledge in all aspects of the philosophy of Marxism, the history of socialism, and the working-class movement’.

Material selected for retention in the archive provides one or more of the following: evidence of a campaign, movement, organisation, or individual’s activities; information pertinent to the anarchist movement, e.g., expositions of anarchist ideology, political positions, rationale behind activities; an insight into membership and associates of anarchist organisations; evidence of the impact of anarchism culturally and politically. Material from political parties is not collected, according to archival policy.

In January 2013, the archive organised an exhibition, called ‘Radical Presses Clydeside – 100 Years of Autonomous Protest Literature’ at Glasgow’s Mitchell Library.

In March 2013, Spirit of Revolt was represented at the 19th "Alternative Futures and Popular Protest" conference at Manchester Metropolitan University.

Spirit of Revolt Archive also works in conjunction with "Radical Glasgow's Strugglepedia" which gives information about Glasgow's radical history.
