= Vernon Lawrence Clare =

New Zealand musician and cabaret owner (1925–1998)

Vernon Lawrence Clare (17 April 1925 – 18 March 1998) was a New Zealand musician, cabaret owner, restaurateur and music teacher. He was born in Wanganui, Wanganui, New Zealand on 17 April 1925.
