= Ron Broom =

New Zealand cricketer

Personal information
- Full name: Roland Francis Broom
- Born: 7 February 1925; Te Kūiti, New Zealand
- Died: 24 December 2016 (aged 91); Palmerston North, New Zealand
- Batting: Left-handed
- Bowling: Left-arm medium

Domestic team information
- Years: Team
- 1954/55: Wellington
- FC debut: 3 January 1955 Wellington v Canterbury
- Last FC: 13 January 1955 Wellington v Otago

Career statistics
Competition	First-class
Matches	3
Runs scored	47
Batting average	11.75
100s/50s	0/0
Top score	21
Balls bowled	330
Wickets	6
Bowling average	19.00
5 wickets in innings	0
10 wickets in match	0
Best bowling	3/18
Catches/stumpings	1/–
- Source: CricketArchive, 16 January 2017

Roland Francis "Ron" Broom (7 February 1925 – 24 December 2016) was a New Zealand first-class cricketer who played for Wellington.

Born in Te Kūiti on 7 February 1925, Broom was a left-arm medium-pace bowler and left-hand batsman. He made three first-class appearances for Wellington in the 1954/55 season, taking six wickets at an average of 19.00. With the bat he scored 47 runs, with a high score of 21, at an average of 11.75.

Broom died in Palmerston North on 24 December 2016, and he was buried in Kelvin Grove Cemetery.
