= Elwyn Welch =

New Zealand ornithologist and farmer

- Born: 13 January 1925; Masterton, New Zealand
- Died: 10 December 1961 (aged 36); Jos, Nigeria
- Occupation: Farmer
- Known for: Ornithologist, conservationist, missionary

Elwyn Owen Arnold Welch (13 January 1925 – 10 December 1961) was a New Zealand farmer, ornithologist, conservationist and Open Brethren missionary. An expert in raising endangered bird chicks, he is best known for his part in the captive breeding of newly re-discovered takahē (Porphyrio hochstetteri) in the 1950s. His efforts live on as Pukaha / Mount Bruce National Wildlife Centre. As an Open Brethren missionary, he served in Nigeria beginning in April 1961. He died in Nigeria at age 36 from polio.

== Early life ==
Welch was born in Masterton, Wairarapa, New Zealand, in 1925. He grew up on the family farm 'Kelvin Grove' on the slopes of Mt Bruce, and was educated as a boarder at Wairarapa College in Masterton. After completing his secondary schooling he returned to the family farm. In his youth he developed a passion for birds, and became one of New Zealand's leading amateur ornithologists. He began his bird conservation work by hand-raising grey teal chicks on the farm. In 1948 he married Shirley Noeline Elizabeth Burridge, and then took over the family farm from his parents.

== Bird conservation work ==
By the mid-1950s, Welch was recognised for his expertise in raising endangered species. He was contacted by the Wildlife Division to assist with a plan to collect takahē chicks from the wild in the Murchison Mountains of Fiordland National Park. Welch spent two years preparing for this assignment, training his bantam hens to sit on boiled eggs inside wooden boxes, and to cope with the stresses of travel. Welch travelled with his bantams to Fiordland in November 1957, driving to Wellington, crossing to the South Island on the ferry and then driving to Te Anau and across the lake on a launch. Together with photographer Peter Morrison and biologist Gordon Williams they carried the bantams and equipment in back packs, into the Takahē Valley. They were able to collect two takahē chicks to be cared for in nest boxes by the bantam hens, along with four eggs. The men returned with the birds and eggs to Wellington. The entire operation was carried out in secrecy because of some public opposition to the idea of removing the birds from their remaining natural environment. The initial operation was only a partial success, because the four eggs failed to hatch.

A second expedition to Fiordland took place in 1959. This time, Welch trained his bantam hens to sit on pūkeko eggs. A clutch of takahē eggs was removed from Fiordland, and successfully hatched and raised by the hens. It was subsequently found that these takahē chicks had imprinted on their bantam mothers and would not mate with other takahē.

However, following on from the successful raising of eggs and chicks, approval was given to capture adult takahē for transfer to the Welch farm at Mt Bruce. The first birds were transferred in July 1959, and members of the public were able to see them in May 1960.

There was wide public interest in the birds, and this led to a decision in 1962 to construct a centre for the captive rearing and display of New Zealand birds. The Mount Bruce Forest Reserve was chosen because it had been a protected area since 1889 and was only 2 kilometres (1.2 mi) from Welch's farm.

In a separate initiative in early 1961, the Wildlife Division captured a number of kākāpō in Fiordland, and transferred them to Kelvin Grove for study, because little was then known about these birds.

== Death in Nigeria ==
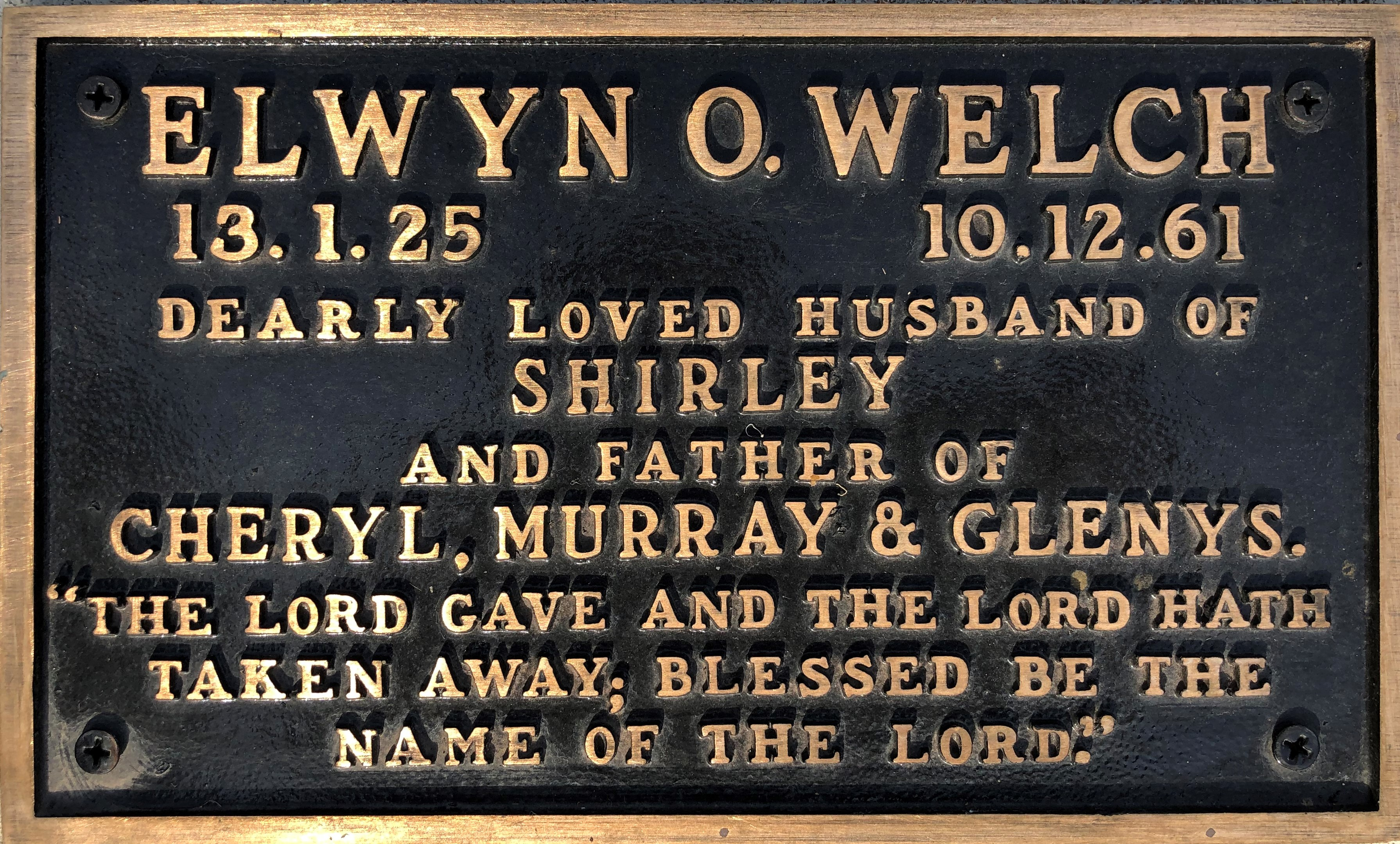
Cemetery marker – Sudan Interior Mission cemetery

Welch had been a member of the Open Brethren since his teenage years, and had an interest in missionary work. In April 1961, Elwyn and his wife Shirley and their three children left New Zealand to travel to Nigeria, to run a guest house for missionaries, and undertake some preaching. In early December 1961, Welch became severely unwell, having contracted polio and died on 10 December 1961 in Jos, Nigeria.

Welch was buried in the Sudan Interior Mission cemetery in Miango, in Plateau State in central Nigeria.
