= Frances Porter =

New Zealand historian and writer (1925–2022)

- Born: Frances Ann Fyfe; 2 May 1925; Hāwera, New Zealand
- Died: 3 April 2022 (aged 96); Wellington, New Zealand
- Education: Victoria University College
- Occupation: Historian
- Spouse: George Porter (m. 1949; died 1998)
- Children: 2
- Writing career
- Genres: Biography; history

Frances Ann Porter (née Fyfe; 2 May 1925 – 3 April 2022) was a New Zealand writer and historian. She edited The Turanga Journals, which contained the letters and journals of William and Jane Williams, and wrote a biography of Maria Atkinson. In 1993, she was awarded an honorary Doctor of Literature degree by Victoria University of Wellington.
