= Samuel Kirkpatrick (businessman) =

- Born: c. 1854; Newry, County Down, Ireland
- Died: 21 May 1925
- Occupation: Businessman
- Known for: Founder of Kirkpatrick Bros. Coffee & Spice Mills; food trade and canning industry career in Ireland, the United States, and New Zealand

Samuel Kirkpatrick (c. 1854 – 21 May 1925) was an Irish-born businessman in the United States and New Zealand. He founded Kirkpatrick Bros. Coffee & Spice Mills in Scranton, Pennsylvania.

He was born in Newry, County Down, Ireland, the son of the son of draper William Kirkpatrick and Rebecca Montgomery Marshall. His father died in October 1854. He went to school in Newry. Kirkpatrick spent five years with a wholesale food merchant learning the ropes, after graduating from Walton College, in Liverpool, England. For some years, he emigrated to the U. S., working for tea wholesalers in both Philadelphia, Pennsylvania and Pittsburgh, Pennsylvania. Kirkpatrick's entree to success came in 1876 with his removal to California, where he worked in two large fruit canneries in San Francisco, California.

Kirkpatrick likely arrived in New Zealand in 1878, and through 1879, he worked as a salesperson for merchants and commission agents Renshaw, Denniston and Co., in Dunedin.
