= June Schoch =

New Zealand athlete

June Clare
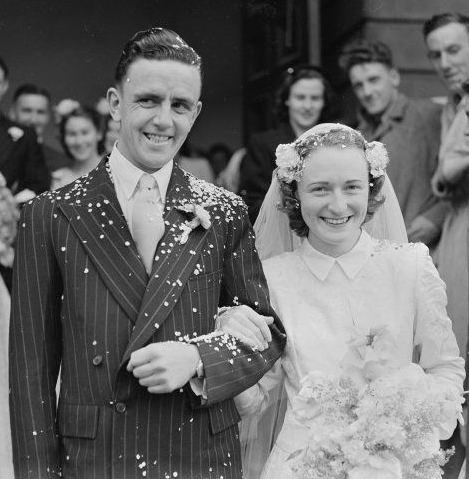
- Schoch with her husband Ronald Clare in 1950

Personal information
- Born: June Barbara Schoch; 25 June 1926
- Died: 14 February 2008 (aged 81)
- Spouse: Ronald Geoffrey Clare (m. 1950; died 1991)

Sport
- Sport: Athletics
- Event: 80 m hurdles

Achievements and titles
- Personal best: 11.4 (1950)
Medal record
Women's athletics
Representing New Zealand
Commonwealth Games
Silver medal – second place	1950 Auckland	80 m hurdles

June Barbara Clare (née Schoch, 25 June 1926 – 14 February 2008) was a New Zealand sprinter. At the 1950 British Empire Games in Auckland, she won the silver medal in the women's 80 metre hurdles. She also competed in the long jump where she placed 11th.

Schoch married Ronald Geoffrey Clare at St Andrew's Church, Wellington, on 25 March 1950, a few weeks after the British Empire Games.
