= Margaret McKenzie (pioneer) =

Margaret McKenzie (c. 1839 – 13 February 1925) was a New Zealand homemaker. She was born in County Tyrone, Ireland, about 1839. She lived in Martins Bay from 1878 to 1903. McKenzie died on 13 February 1925 in Andersons Bay.

Her daughter Alice Mackenzie (née McKenzie) published The Pioneers of Martins Bay about her childhood at Martins Bay.
