= 1927 South American Championships in Athletics =

- Dates: 15–20 April
- Host city: Santiago, Chile

The 1927 South American Championships in Athletics were held in Santiago, Chile between 14 and 19 April.

== Medal summary ==
=== Men's events ===
Event	Gold		Silver		Bronze	
100 metres	Juan Piña; Argentina	10.8 =CR	Rodolfo Wagner; Chile		Alex Hanning; Chile	
200 metres	Juan Piña; Argentina	22.0 CR	Rodolfo Wagner; Chile		Alex Hanning; Chile	
400 metres	Ángel Prada; Argentina	50.0	Roberto Genta; Argentina		José Vicente Salinas; Chile	
800 metres	Serafín Dengra; Argentina	1:58.2 CR	Leopoldo Ledesma; Argentina		Guillermo Godoy; Chile	
1500 metres	Leopoldo Ledesma; Argentina	4:10.2 CR	Luis Suárez; Argentina		Víctor Moreno; Chile	
3000 metres	Manuel Plaza; Chile	8:54.2	Fernando Cicarelli; Argentina			
5000 metres	Manuel Plaza; Chile	15:36.0	Belisario Flores; Chile		Pedro Pérez; Chile	
10,000 metres	Manuel Plaza; Chile	32:11.2	Florides Castillo; Chile		Pedro Arancibia; Chile	
110 metres hurdles	Valerio Vallanía; Argentina	15.6 =CR	Alfredo Ugarte; Chile		Héctor Fischer; Chile	
400 metres hurdles	Carlos Müller; Chile	56.4	Roberto Genta; Argentina	56.4	Humberto Lara; Chile	
4 × 100 metres relay	Argentina; Alberto Barucco; Roberto Genta; Juan Gagliardi; Juan Bautista Pina	42.8 CR	Chile			
4 × 400 metres relay	Argentina; Roberto Genta; Angel Prada; Félix Escobar; Juan Acosta	3:24.2	Chile			
3000 metres team race	Chile					
Cross country	Manuel Plaza; Chile	49:08.0	Florides Castillo; Chile		Pedro Arancibia; Chile	
High jump	Valerio Vallanía; Argentina	1.86 CR	Carlos Japke; Chile	1.80	Luis Garay; Chile	1.80
Pole vault	Jorge Haeberli; Argentina	3.70 CR	Julio Bertini; Argentina	3.60	Humberto Güiraldes; Chile	3.40
Long jump	Oscar Alvarado; Chile	6.69	Julio Moreno; Chile	6.65	Valerio Vallanía; Argentina	6.63
Triple jump	Luis Brunetto; Argentina	14.64	Atilio Vicentini; Argentina	14.28	Humberto Güiraldes; Chile	14.07
Shot put	Benjamín Acevedo; Chile	12.69	Custodio Seguel; Chile	12.25	Luis Romana; Argentina	12.18
Discus throw	Pedro Elsa; Argentina	38.56 CR	Héctor Benapres; Chile	38.43	David Martín Estévez; Uruguay	37.30
Hammer throw	Federico Kleger; Argentina	46.69	Pedro Goic; Chile	45.74	Ricardo Bayer; Chile	45.70
Javelin throw	Guillermo Newbery; Argentina	53.98 CR	Custodio Seguel; Chile	52.86	Pedro Ceballos; Chile	52.45
Decathlon	Erwin Gevert; Chile	6668.06 CR	Serapio Cabello; Chile	6410.07	Carlos Japke; Chile	6408.08

== Medal table ==
Rank	Nation	Gold	Silver	Bronze	Total
1	Argentina (ARG)	14	7	2	23
2	Chile (CHI)	9	15	16	40
3	Uruguay (URU)	0	0	1	1
Totals (3 entries)		23	22	19	64
