= 1931 South American Championships in Athletics =

- Dates: 30 April–5 May
- Host city: Buenos Aires, Argentina

The 1931 South American Championships in Athletics were held in Buenos Aires, Argentina between 5 April and 5 May.

== Medal summary ==
=== Men's events ===
Event	Gold		Silver		Bronze	
100 metres	Carlos Bianchi Lutti; Argentina	10.9	José de Almeida; Brazil	11.0	Juan Piña; Argentina	
200 metres	Carlos Bianchi Lutti; Argentina	21.9 =CR	Juan Piña; Argentina	22.2	José Vicente Salinas; Chile	
400 metres	José Vicente Salinas; Chile	49.6	Héctor Domínguez; Uruguay	49.8	Ernesto Riveros; Chile	
800 metres	Hermenegildo Del Rosso; Argentina	1:58.6	Leopoldo Ledesma; Argentina	1:59.6	Alfredo Narváez; Peru	
1500 metres	Leopoldo Ledesma; Argentina	4:05.8	Hermenegildo Del Rosso; Argentina	4:07.0	Ernesto Medel; Chile	4:09.6
3000 metres	Luis Oliva; Argentina	8:46.8 CR	Belisario Alarcón; Chile	8:47.0	Juan Carlos Zabala; Argentina	8:48.2
5000 metres	José Ribas; Argentina	15:04.8 CR	Juan Carlos Zabala; Argentina	15:11.6	Belisario Alarcón; Chile	15:16.6
10,000 metres	Juan Carlos Zabala; Argentina	31:19.0 CR	José Ribas; Argentina	31:26.8	Belisario Alarcón; Chile	32:19.6
110 metres hurdles	Miguel Aldatz; Argentina	15.6	Armando Sorucco; Chile	15.6	Valerio Vallanía; Argentina	
400 metres hurdles	Sylvio Padilha; Brazil	54.8 CR	Carlos dos Reis; Brazil	55.6	Carlos Müller; Chile	56.0
4 × 100 metres relay	Argentina; Juan Bautista Pina; Daniel Hermida; Rodolfo Borzino; Carlos Bianchi Lutti	43.0	Brazil; José de Almeida; Mario Marques; Arnaldo Ferrara; Ibere Reis da Silva	43.6	Uruguay; Jaime Cardoso; Ricardo La Rosa; José La Rosa; Jaime Meregalli	
4 × 400 metres relay	Chile; R. Salinas; Guillermo Soto; Ernesto Riveros; José Vicente Salinas	3:25.2	Argentina; José Signoris; Leonidas Payal Alzua; Juan Acosta; Roberto Genta	3:25.8	Brazil; Sylvio Padilha; Carlos Reis Filho; Ibere Reis da Silva; Domingos Puglisi	3:28.2
3000 metres team race	Argentina		Chile		Brazil	
Cross country	Fernando Cicarelli; Argentina	45:51.0	Humberto Delgado; Argentina	45:52.2	Jorge Donoso; Chile	46:13.0
High jump	Valerio Vallanía; Argentina	1.85	Alfonso Burgos; Chile	1.85	Alberto Estrada; Chile	1.80
Pole vault	Diego Pajmaevich; Argentina	3.70	Adolfo Schlegel; Chile	3.70	Carlos Joel Nelli; Brazil	3.70
Long jump	Héctor Berra; Argentina	6.97 CR	Ciro Falcão; Brazil	6.91	Juan Moura; Chile	6.69
Triple jump	Luis Brunetto; Argentina	14.23	Pedro Aizcorbe; Argentina	13.64	Ricardo Mendiburo; Chile	13.63
Shot put	Héctor Benapres; Chile	13.39 CR	Juan Conrads; Chile	13.38	Rodolfo Butori; Argentina	13.36
Discus throw	Héctor Benapres; Chile	44.30 CR	Armando Peloursson; Argentina	41.39	Bento Barros; Brazil	40.59
Hammer throw	Pedro Goic; Chile	46.50	Federico Kleger; Argentina	45.57	Alfredo Wismer; Argentina	45.44
Javelin throw	Joaquim da Silva; Brazil	55.74 CR	Efraín Santibáñez; Chile	55.58	José Pergañeda; Argentina	54.96
Decathlon	Héctor Berra; Argentina	7065.62 CR	Armando Sorucco; Chile	6962.9	Carlos Woebcken; Brazil	6591.19

== Medal table ==
Rank	Nation	Gold	Silver	Bronze	Total
1	Argentina (ARG)	16	10	6	32
2	Chile (CHI)	5	8	10	23
3	Brazil (BRA)	2	4	5	11
4	Uruguay (URU)	0	1	1	2
5	Peru (PER)	0	0	1	1
Totals (5 entries)		23	23	23	69
