= 1926 South American Championships in Athletics =

- Dates: 15–20 April
- Host city: Montevideo, Uruguay

The 1926 South American Championships in Athletics were held in Montevideo, Uruguay between 15 and 20 April.

== Medal summary ==
=== Men's events ===
Event	Gold		Silver		Bronze	
100 metres	Eduardo Albe; Argentina	11.0	Alberto Barucco; Argentina	11.2	Juan Carlos Ure Aldao; Argentina	
200 metres	Eduardo Albe; Argentina	21.8w	Juan Carlos Ure Aldao; Argentina	22.0w	Roberto Genta; Argentina	22.1w
400 metres	Federico Brewster; Argentina	50.0	Ángel Prada; Argentina	50.4	Guillermo Godoy; Chile	
800 metres	Leopoldo Ledesma; Argentina	1:58.4 CR	Ernesto Medel; Chile	2:00.0	Víctor Moreno; Chile	
1500 metres	Leopoldo Ledesma; Argentina	4:11.0 CR	Víctor Moreno; Chile	4:12.0	Ernesto Medel; Chile	
3000 metres	Manuel Plaza; Chile	8:51.4 CR	Pedro Pérez; Chile	9:00.4	Fernando Cicarelli; Argentina	9:12.8
5000 metres	Manuel Plaza; Chile	15:12.4 CR	Pedro Pérez; Chile	15:40.2	Fernando Cicarelli; Argentina	15:40.4
10,000 metres	Manuel Plaza; Chile	31:54.0 CR	José Ribas; Argentina	32:48.2	Juan Bravo; Chile	
110 metres hurdles	Valerio Vallanía; Argentina	15.6 CR	Alfredo Ugarte; Chile	15.8	César Tartaglia; Uruguay	
400 metres hurdles	Federico Brewster; Argentina	55.4 CR	Carlos Müller; Chile	56.8	Raúl Lafitte; Uruguay	56.8
4 × 100 metres relay	Argentina; Juan Bautista Pina; Eduardo Albe; Mandia; Juan Carlos Ure	43.2	Uruguay; Arnaboldi; Juan Felitto; Pastori; Leidekar	43.6	Chile; Fernando Primard; Alfredo Ugarte; Alex Hanning; Villarroel	
4 × 400 metres relay	Argentina; Ángel Prada; Alberto Heguy; Roberto Genta; Federico Brewster	3:25.2	Chile; Elias Catalan; Alfredo Ugarte; Jara; Guillermo Godoy	3:30.0 CR		
3000 metres team race	Chile		Argentina		Uruguay	
Cross country	Manuel Plaza; Chile	35:40.2	A. Castillo; Chile	36:39.0	José Ribas; Argentina	
High jump	Valerio Vallanía; Argentina	1.85 CR	Carlos Patiño; Uruguay	1.80	Atilio Vallanía; Argentina	1.80
Pole vault	Jorge Haeberli; Argentina	3.65 CR	Enrique Sansot; Chile	3.50	Máximo Virgolini; Argentina	3.50
Long jump	Valerio Vallanía; Argentina	6.75 CR	Julio Moreno; Chile	6.66	H. Carvallo; Chile	6.47
Triple jump	Luis Brunetto; Argentina	15.10 CR	Atilio Vicentini; Argentina	14.22	Raúl Leal; Uruguay	13.42
Shot put	Benjamín Acevedo; Chile	13.07 CR	Custodio Seguel; Chile	13.06	Jorge Llobet Cullen; Argentina	12.59
Discus throw	Jorge Llobet Cullen; Argentina	38.46 CR	Pedro Elsa; Argentina	38.34	David Martín Estévez; Uruguay	38.26
Hammer throw	Federico Kleger; Argentina	46.46 CR	Luis Romana; Argentina	44.84	Ricardo Bayer; Chile	43.77
Javelin throw	Carlos Maldonado; Argentina	51.93	Juan Ahlers; Uruguay	48.63	Custodio Seguel; Chile	47.93
Decathlon	Valerio Vallanía; Argentina	5937.57 CR	Guillermo Newbery; Argentina	5895.47	Erwin Gevert; Chile	5765.42

== Medal table ==
Rank	Nation	Gold	Silver	Bronze	Total
1	Argentina (ARG)	17	9	8	34
2	Chile (CHI)	6	11	9	26
3	Uruguay (URU)	0	3	5	8
Totals (3 entries)		23	23	22	68
