= 1929 South American Championships in Athletics =

- Dates: 5–10 May
- Host city: Lima, Peru

The 1929 South American Championships in Athletics were held in Lima, Peru between 5 and 10 May.

== Medal summary ==
=== Men's events ===
Event	Gold		Silver		Bronze	
100 metres	Hernán Spinassi; Argentina	10.7 CR	Carlos Bianchi Lutti; Argentina		Juan Carlos Ure Aldao; Argentina	
200 metres	Hernán Spinassi; Argentina	21.9 CR	José Vicente Salinas; Chile		Juan Carlos Ure Aldao; Argentina	
400 metres	José Vicente Salinas; Chile	49.0 CR	Santiago Hintze; Argentina	49.4	Ernesto Riveros; Chile	
800 metres	Leopoldo Ledesma; Argentina	1:55.2 CR	Hermenegildo Del Rosso; Argentina		Ernesto Medel; Chile	
1500 metres	Leopoldo Ledesma; Argentina	4:01.0 CR	Ernesto Medel; Chile		Roger Ceballos; Argentina	
3000 metres	Belisario Alarcón; Chile	8:51.0 CR				
5000 metres	Belisario Alarcón; Chile	15:44.8	Lindor Pizarro; Chile		Pedro Pérez; Chile	
10,000 metres	José Ribas; Argentina	32:10.4	Fernando Cicarelli; Argentina		Juan Bravo; Chile	
110 metres hurdles	Valerio Vallanía; Argentina	15.3 CR	Alfredo Ugarte; Chile	15.4	Evaristo Gomes; Peru	
400 metres hurdles	Pedro Gálvez; Peru	55.2 CR	Juan Acosta; Argentina	55.4	Juan Figueiras; Argentina	
4 × 100 metres relay	Argentina; Hernan Spinassi; Cagliardi; Pages; Juan Carlos Ure	42.2 CR	Peru; García; Serrot; Pedro Gálvez; Ordoñez	43.2	Chile; Viollo; Gutiérrez; Rozas; Luis Miguel	
4 × 400 metres relay	Chile; Gutiérrez; Humberto Scacchi; Guillermo Godoy; José Vicente Salinas	3:22.4 CR	Argentina; Roberto Genta; Juan Acosta; Santiago Hintze; Salas		Peru; Pedro Gálvez; Souza; Bravo; Noya	
3000 metres team race	Argentina		Chile			
Cross country	Belisario Alarcón; Chile	33/36:16.0	Arturo Velert; Argentina		Fernando Cicarelli; Argentina	
High jump	Valerio Vallanía; Argentina	1.80	Luis Garay; Chile	1.80	Pablo Riesen; Argentina	1.75
Pole vault	Diego Pajmaevich; Argentina	3.80 CR	Adolfo Schlegel; Chile	3.70	Alfredo Escobedo; Argentina	3.70
Long jump	Juan Moura; Chile	6.87 CR	Pedro Aizcorbe; Argentina	6.74	Carlos Butti; Argentina	6.63
Triple jump	Luis Brunetto; Argentina	14.77	Ricardo Mendiburo; Chile	14.45	Pedro Aizcorbe; Argentina	14.27
Shot put	Kurt Pollack; Chile	13.23 CR	Héctor Benapres; Chile	12.77	Guillermo Otto; Chile	12.64
Discus throw	Héctor Benapres; Chile	41.64 CR	Pedro Elsa; Argentina	41.44	Arístides Domínguez; Argentina	40.63
Hammer throw	Federico Kleger; Argentina	49.57 CR	Alfredo Wismer; Argentina	46.55	Ricardo Bayer; Chile	46.42
Javelin throw	Tomás Medián; Chile	53.31	Antonio Medvesigh; Argentina	51.76	F. Vega; Chile	49.52
Decathlon	Héctor Berra; Argentina	6511.34	Santiago León Amatrián; Argentina	6264.33	Fernando Primard; Chile	6075

== Medal table ==
Rank	Nation	Gold	Silver	Bronze	Total
1	Argentina (ARG)	13	12	10	35
2	Chile (CHI)	9	9	9	27
3	Peru (PER)	1	1	2	4
Totals (3 entries)		23	22	21	66
