= 1931 South American Championships in Athletics (unofficial) =

Unofficial South American Championships in Athletics
- Dates: May 8–10
- Host city: Montevideo, Uruguay
- Level: Senior
- Events: 20

Unofficial South American Championships in Athletics were held in Montevideo, Uruguay on May 8–10, 1931. The event was held in celebration of the 100th anniversary of Uruguayan independence.

== Medal summary ==
Medal winners are published.

=== Men ===
Event	Gold		Silver		Bronze	
100 metres	Carlos Bianchi Lutti (ARG)	10.8	Jaime Cardozo (URU)	11.0	José de Almeida (BRA)	
200 metres	Carlos Bianchi Lutti (ARG)	22.0	José Vicente Salinas (CHI)	22.4	Iberê Reis (BRA)	
400 metres	José Vicente Salinas (CHI)	49.2	Héctor Domínguez (URU)	50.4	Domingos Puglisi (BRA)	
800 metres	Hermenegildo Del Rosso (ARG)	1:57.0	Domingos Puglisi (BRA)		Alfredo Narváez (PER)	
1500 metres	Hermenegildo Del Rosso (ARG)	4:07.4	Belisario Alarcón (CHI)		Roger Ceballos (ARG)	
3000 metres	Juan Carlos Zabala (ARG)	8:44.2	Belisario Alarcón (CHI)	8:54.8	Roger Ceballos (ARG)	
5000 metres	Juan Carlos Zabala (ARG)	15:14.2	Roger Ceballos (ARG)	15:26.8	Carlos Cabrera (CHI)	
10,000 metres	José Ribas (ARG)	31:18.8	Carlos Cabrera (CHI)		Murillo de Araújo (BRA)	
110 metres hurdles	Armando Sorucco (CHI)	16.0	Sylvio Padilha (BRA)	16.2	Alfredo Ugarte (CHI)	
400 metres hurdles	Carlos Müller (CHI)	56.2	Carlos dos Reis (BRA)	56.8	Alfredo Egaña (CHI)	
High jump	Alfonso Burgos (CHI)	1.80	Alberto Estrada (CHI)	1.80	N.R. Di Lorenzo (URU)	1.75
Pole vault	Adolfo Schlegel (CHI)	3.80	Carlos Joel Nelli (BRA)	3.70	Carlos Rocamora (ARG)	3.60
Long jump	Héctor Berra (ARG)	7.08	João Rehder Netto (BRA)	6.705	Juan Moura (CHI)	6.655
Triple jump	Luis Brunetto (ARG)	14.305	Pedro Aizcorbe (ARG)	14.215	Julio Bastón (URU)	14.055
Shot put	Guillermo Otto (CHI)	13.33	Juan Conrads (CHI)	13.065	Armando Sorucco (CHI)	12.10
Discus throw	Armando Peloursson (ARG)	41.135	Bento Barros (BRA)	40.645	Juan Conrads (CHI)	???
Hammer throw	Federico Kleger (ARG)	47.255	Antonio Barticevic (CHI)	45.475	Alfredo Wismer (ARG)	44.785
Javelin throw	Joaquim da Silva (BRA)	58.125	Efraín Santibáñez (CHI)	57.645	Armando Sorucco (CHI)	54.53
4 × 100 metres relay	Uruguay	42.8	Argentina	43.2	Brazil	
4 × 400 metres relay	Brazil	3:25.0	Argentina		Uruguay	

== Medal table (unofficial) ==
* Host nation (Uruguay)

Rank	Nation	Gold	Silver	Bronze	Total
1	Argentina (ARG)	11	4	4	19
2	Chile (CHI)	6	8	7	21
3	Brazil (BRA)	2	6	5	13
4	Uruguay (URU)*	1	2	3	6
5	Peru (PER)	0	0	1	1
Totals (5 entries)		20	20	20	60
