= 1933 South American Championships in Athletics =

- Dates: 6–9 April
- Host city: Montevideo, Uruguay

The 1933 South American Championships in Athletics were held in Montevideo, Uruguay, between 6 and 9 April.

== Medal summary ==
=== Men's events ===
Event	Gold		Silver		Bronze	
100 metres	José de Almeida; Brazil	10.6 CR	Juan Maglio; Argentina	10.6	José Vicente Salinas; Chile	11.0
200 metres	José Vicente Salinas; Chile	21.7 CR	José de Almeida; Brazil		Antonio Sande; Argentina	
400 metres	José Vicente Salinas; Chile	48.4 CR	Héctor Domínguez; Uruguay	49.2	Juan Anderson; Argentina	49.2
800 metres	Juan Anderson; Argentina	1:57.8	Hermenegildo Del Rosso; Argentina	1:58.6	Carlos Gallardo; Argentina	1:59.6
1500 metres	Belisario Alarcón; Chile	4:02.6	Hermenegildo Del Rosso; Argentina	4:05.2	Juan Carballeira; Argentina	4:06.4
3000 metres	Luis Oliva; Argentina	8:51.6	Martínez; Argentina	9:12.2	Eusebio Guiñez; Argentina	
5000 metres	Roger Ceballos; Argentina	15:14.6	Luis Oliva; Argentina	15:17.6	Eusebio Guiñez; Argentina	
10,000 metres	Eusebio Guiñez; Argentina	33:08.0	Belisario Alarcón; Chile	33:23.6	Roger Ceballos; Argentina	
Road race	Manuel Plaza; Chile	1:59:15	José Ribas; Argentina	2:02:39	Fernando Cicarelli; Argentina	
110 metres hurdles	Sylvio Padilha; Brazil	14.8 CR	Miguel Aldatz; Argentina	14.8	Juan Lavenás; Argentina	
400 metres hurdles	Sylvio Padilha; Brazil	54.0 CR	Gerardo Lorenzo; Argentina	55.4	Héctor Domínguez; Uruguay	56.2
4 × 100 metres relay	Uruguay; Jorge Bonino; Arnaldo Borras; Jaime Meregalli; Laindevar	44.0	Brazil; José de Almeida; Lúcio de Castro; Sylvio Padilha; Medina	45.5		
4 × 400 metres relay	Argentina; Francisco Dova; Werner Kalz; Juan Anderson; Gerardo Lorenzo	3:25.0	Uruguay; Héctor Domínguez; Jorge Sierra; Ciro Vignoli; San Román	3:27.2		
3000 metres team race	Argentina		Uruguay			
Cross country	Manuel Plaza; Chile	39:11.6	Fernando Cicarelli; Argentina	39:16.4	Belisario Alarcón; Chile	
High jump	Alfonso Burgos; Chile	1.85	Luis Bosetti; Argentina	1.80	Julio Bastón; Uruguay	1.80
Pole vault	Diego Pajmaevich; Argentina	3.95 CR	Lúcio de Castro; Brazil	3.80	Pedro Furné; Argentina	3.30
Long jump	Héctor Berra; Argentina	7.26 CR	Mario Cardoso; Uruguay	6.47	Ramón Quesada; Argentina	6.46
Triple jump	Tomás Diz; Argentina	13.80	Pedro Aizcorbe; Argentina	13.75	Julio Bastón; Uruguay	13.66
Shot put	Rodolfo Butori; Argentina	14.15 CR	Héctor Benapres; Chile	13.52	Antônio Lyra; Brazil	13.49
Discus throw	Héctor Benapres; Chile	43.88	Pedro Elsa; Argentina	40.93	Bento Barros; Brazil	40.15
Hammer throw	Federico Kleger; Argentina	53.51 CR	Antonio Barticevic; Chile	45.53	Juan Fusé; Argentina	45.00
Javelin throw	Efraín Santibáñez; Chile	58.10 CR	Julio Diturbide; Argentina	56.58	José Pergañeda; Argentina	56.10
Decathlon	Diego Pajmaevich; Argentina	5759.23	Raimundo Guiñazu; Argentina	4724.58		

== Medal table ==
Rank	Nation	Gold	Silver	Bronze	Total
1	Argentina (ARG)	12	14	13	39
2	Chile (CHI)	8	3	2	13
3	Brazil (BRA)	3	3	2	8
4	Uruguay (URU)	1	4	3	8
Totals (4 entries)		24	24	20	68
