= Argentina at the 1932 Summer Olympics =

- IOC code: ARG
- NOC: Argentine Olympic Committee

in Los Angeles
- Competitors: 33 in 6 sports
- Flag bearer: Alberto Zorrilla
- Medals Ranked 11th: Gold 3 Silver 1 Bronze 0 Total 4

Summer Olympics appearances (overview)
- 1900; 1904; 1908; 1912; 1920; 1924; 1928; 1932; 1936; 1948; 1952; 1956; 1960; 1964; 1968; 1972; 1976; 1980; 1984; 1988; 1992; 1996; 2000; 2004; 2008; 2012; 2016; 2020; 2024

Argentina at the 1932 Summer Olympics in Los Angeles, California was the nation's sixth appearance out of nine editions of the Summer Olympic Games. Argentina sent to the 1932 Summer Olympics its third national team, under the auspices of the Argentine Olympic Committee (Comité Olímpico Argentino), 33 athletes (all males) that competed in 30 events in 6 sports: athletics, boxing, fencing, shooting, swimming, and weightlifting. They brought home 4 Olympic medals: one gold medal in the marathon, and 2 gold medals and one silver medal in boxing.

== Medalists ==
Argentina finished in 11th position in the final medal rankings, with three gold medals and one silver medal.

Medal	Name	Sport	Event
Gold	Juan Carlos Zabala	Athletics	Men's Marathon
Gold	Carmelo Robledo	Boxing	Men's Featherweight
Gold	Santiago Lovell	Boxing	Men's Heavyweight
Silver	Amado Azar	Boxing	Men's Featherweight

== Athletics ==
Key

- Note–Ranks given for track events are within the athlete's heat only
- Q = Qualified for the next round
- q = Qualified for the next round as a fastest loser or, in field events, by position without achieving the qualifying target
- N/A = Round not applicable for the event
- Bye = Athlete not required to compete in round

Men
Track & road events

Athlete	Event	Heat		Quarterfinal		Semifinal		Final	
Athlete	Event	Result	Rank	Result	Rank	Result	Rank	Result	Rank
Carlos Bianchi	100 m	10.8	1 Q	10.5	2 Q	10.73	4	Did not advance	
Héctor Berra	100 m	11.2	3 Q	Did not advance					
Samuel Giacosa	100 m	11.1	5	Did not advance					
Carlos Bianchi	200 m	22.3	3 Q	21.4 OR	1 Q	21.6	3 Q	21.6	5
Roberto Genta	200 m	25.3	1 Q	21.8	3 Q	22.0	6	Did not advance	
Hermenegildo de Rosso	800 m	1:54.9	5	—N/a				Did not advance	
Hermenegildo de Rosso	1500 m	4:06.0	5	—N/a				Did not advance	
José Ribas	10000 m	—N/a							11
Fernando Chacarelli	10000 m	—N/a							12
Luis Oliva	3000 m steeplechase	Did not finish		—N/a				Did not advance	
Juan Carlos Zabala	Marathon	—N/a						2:31:36 OR	1st place, gold medalist(s)
Fernando Chacarelli	Marathon	—N/a						2:55:49	17
José Ribas	Marathon	—N/a						Did not finish	

Field events

Athlete	Event	Qualification		Final	
Athlete	Event	Distance	Position	Distance	Position
Héctor Berra	Long jump	—N/a		6.66	7
Pedro Elsa	Shot put	—N/a		11.770	14
Pedro Elsa	Discus throw	—N/a		No mark	
Federico Kleger	Hammer throw	—N/a		48.33	6

Combined events – Decathlon

Athlete	Event	100 m	LJ	SP	HJ	400 m	110H	DT	PV	JT	1500 m	Final	Rank
Héctor Berra	Result	11.1	7.14	—N/a								Did not finish	
Héctor Berra	Points	786	847	—N/a								Did not finish	

== Boxing ==
Men

Athlete	Event	Round of 16	Quarterfinals	Semifinals	Final	
Athlete	Event	Opposition Result	Opposition Result	Opposition Result	Opposition Result	Rank
Juan José Trillo	Flyweight	Werner Spannagel (GER); L PTS	Did not advance			
Carlos Pereyra	Bantamweight	Patrick Hughes (IRL); W PTS	Joseph Lang (USA); L WO	Did not advance		
Carmelo Robledo	Featherweight	BYE	Ernest Smith (IRL); W PTS	Allan Carlsson (SWE); W PTS	Josef Schleinkofer (GER); W PTS	Gold medal
Eduardo Vargas	Lightweight	Frankie Genovese (CAN); L PTS	Did not advance			
Luis Sardella	Welterweight	Edward Flynn (USA); L PTS	Did not advance			
Amado Azar	Middleweight	BYE	Aldo Longinotti (ITA); W PTS	Roger Michelot (FRA); W PTS	Carmen Barth (USA); L PTS	Silver medal
Rafael Lang	Light heavyweight	BYE	Peter Jørgensen (DEN); L PTS	Did not advance		5
Santiago Lovell	Heavyweight	BYE	Gunnar Bärlund (FIN); W PTS	George Maughan (CAN); W TKO	Luigi Rovati (ITA); W PTS	Gold medal

== Fencing ==
Five fencers, all men, represented Argentina in 1932.

Men's foil

- Roberto Larraz
- Ángel Gorordo
- Rodolfo Valenzuela

Men's team foil

- Raúl Saucedo, Roberto Larraz, Rodolfo Valenzuela, Ángel Gorordo

Men's épée

- Raúl Saucedo

Men's sabre

- Carmelo Merlo

== Shooting ==
Two shooters represented Argentina in 1932.

Men

Athlete	Event	Final	
Athlete	Event	Score	Rank
Antonio Daneri	50 m rifle, prone	286	16
Sigfrido Vogel	50 m rifle, prone	281	22

== Swimming ==
Men

Athlete	Event	Heat		Semifinal		Final	
Athlete	Event	Time	Rank	Time	Rank	Time	Rank
Leopoldo Tahier	100 metre freestyle	1:05.3	5	Did not advance			
Alfredo Rocca	100 metre freestyle	1:04.2	3	Did not advance			
Justo José Caraballo	200 metre breaststroke	2:55.2	3	Did not advance			
Carlos Kennedy; Leopoldo Tahier; Roberto Peper; Alfredo Rocca	4 × 200 metre freestyle relay	—N/a				10:13.1	6

== Weightlifting ==
Men

Athlete	Event	Military Press		Snatch		Clean & Jerk		Total	Rank
Athlete	Event	Result	Rank	Result	Rank	Result	Rank	Total	Rank
Julio Juaneda	75 kg	75	7	90	7	120	6	285	6
