= 1924 South American Championships in Athletics =

- Dates: 17–25 April
- Host city: Buenos Aires, Argentina

The 1924 South American Championships in Athletics were held in Buenos Aires, Argentina between 17 and 22 April.

== Medal summary ==
=== Men's events ===
Event	Gold		Silver		Bronze	
100 metres	Miguel Enrico; Argentina	10.9	Augusto de Negri; Argentina		Luis Miguel; Chile	
200 metres	Félix Escobar; Argentina	22.1 CR	Luis Miguel; Chile		Roberto García; Argentina	
400 metres	Félix Escobar; Argentina	49.4 CR	Francisco Dova; Argentina	49.4	Federico Brewster; Argentina	
800 metres	Francisco Dova; Argentina	2:02.9 CR	Alfredo Iglesias; Uruguay			
1500 metres	Víctor Moreno; Chile	4:11.9 CR	Luis Decouvieres; Chile	4:13.0	Juan Baeza; Chile	
3000 metres	Manuel Plaza; Chile	8:56.3 CR				
5000 metres	Manuel Plaza; Chile	15:37.2 CR	Juan Baeza; Chile		Luis Celis; Chile	
10,000 metres	Manuel Plaza; Chile	32:19.8 CR	Juan Bravo; Chile	33:04.5	Luis Celis; Chile	33:12.8
110 metres hurdles	Guillermo Newbery; Argentina	15.8 CR	Otto Dietsch; Argentina		Leandro Gómez; Uruguay	
400 metres hurdles	Humberto Lara; Chile	56.2 CR	Enrique Thompson; Argentina		Carlos Müller; Chile	
4 × 100 metres relay	Argentina; Camilo Ribas; Augusto Negri; Otto Dietsch; Miguel Enrico	42.9 CR	Uruguay; Isabelino Gradín; Jesús Posadas; Carlos Bastos; Juan Felitto		Chile ? ? Marcos Loyola; Luis Miguel	
4 × 400 metres relay	Argentina; Casanova; Félix Escobar; Francisco Dova; Federico Brewster	3:23.4 CR	Chile; Elias Catalan; Fernando Primard; Carlos Müller; David Aste		Uruguay ? Isabelino Gradín ? Raúl Lafitte	
3000 metres team race	Chile					
Cross country	Manuel Plaza; Chile	58:17.3	Juan Baeza; Chile		Víctor Moreno; Chile	
High jump	Valerio Vallanía; Argentina	1.80 CR	Hernán Orrego; Chile	1.75	Carlos Fernández; Uruguay	1.70
Pole vault	Jorge Haeberli; Argentina	3.60 CR	Ernesto Goycolea; Chile	3.50	Roberto Holm; Argentina	3.50
Long jump	Ramiro García; Chile	6.63	Luis Brunetto; Argentina	6.63	Juan Felitto; Uruguay	6.41
Triple jump	Luis Brunetto; Argentina	14.64 CR	Alfredo Miserere; Argentina	13.72	Ángel Colombo; Uruguay	13.55
Shot put	Domingo Minetti; Argentina	12.74 CR	Benjamín Acevedo; Chile	12.49	Jorge Llobet Cullen; Argentina	12.46
Discus throw	David Martín Estévez; Uruguay	38.34 CR	Héctor Benapres; Chile	37.81	Jorge Llobet Cullen; Argentina	36.83
Hammer throw	Alfredo Wismer; Argentina	41.61 CR	Jorge Llobet Cullen; Argentina	40.39	Luis Romana; Argentina	39.50
Javelin throw	Arturo Medina; Chile	53.70 CR	José Jiménez; Argentina	50.18	Guillermo Newbery; Argentina	48.45
Decathlon	Enrique Thompson; Argentina	5876.67 CR	Guillermo Newbery; Argentina	5851.7	Benjamín Acevedo; Chile	

== Medal table ==
Rank	Nation	Gold	Silver	Bronze	Total
1	Argentina (ARG)	13	9	7	29
2	Chile (CHI)	9	10	8	27
3	Uruguay (URU)	1	2	5	8
Totals (3 entries)		23	21	20	64
