= 1922 South American Championships in Athletics (unofficial) =

Unofficial South American Championships in Athletics
- Host city: Rio de Janeiro, Brazil
- Level: Senior
- Events: 22

Unofficial South American Championships in Athletics were held in Rio de Janeiro, Brazil in 1922. They were part of the "Jogos Olímpicos Latino-Americanos" held in celebration of the 100th anniversary of Brazilian independence under the patronage of the IOC.

== Medal summary ==
Medal winners are published.

=== Men ===
Event	Gold		Silver		Bronze	
100 metres	Augusto de Negri (ARG)	11.2	Luis Miguel (CHI)	11.4	Carlos Bastos (URU)	
200 metres*						
400 metres	Isabelino Gradín (URU)	50.6	Dionysio de Figueirêdo (BRA)	50.8	Félix Escobar (ARG)	
800 metres	Luis Suárez (ARG)	2:05.2	Carlos Springer (ARG)	2:06.8	Rodolfo Etcheverry (ARG)	
1500 metres	Luis Suárez (ARG)	4:05.6	Alfredo Gomes (BRA)	4:06.2	Raúl Amat (ARG)	
3000 metres	Manuel Plaza (CHI)	9:08.8	Oscar Guajardo (CHI)		Pedro Arancibia (CHI)	
5000 metres	Manuel Plaza (CHI)	16:06.6	Alfredo Gomes (BRA)	16:10.8	José Ribas (BRA)	
10,000 metres	Manuel Plaza (CHI)	33:17.0	Juan Bravo (CHI)		José Ribas (BRA)	
Marathon	Manuel Plaza (CHI)		Luis Celis (CHI)		Matheus Marcondes (BRA)	
110 metres hurdles	Guillermo Newbery (ARG)	16.0	Aldo Travaglia (BRA)		Otto Dietsch (ARG)	
400 metres hurdles	Enrique Thompson (ARG)	56.8	Andrés Mazzali (URU)		Agustín Garay (ARG)	
High jump	Valerio Vallanía (ARG)	1.815	Enrico Falcão (BRA)	1.815	Carlos Patiño (URU)	1.75
Pole vault	José Amejeiras (URU)	3.40	Ernesto Kausel (CHI)	3.40	Ernesto Goycolea (CHI)	3.30
Long jump	Ramiro García (CHI)	6.695	Carlos Patiño (URU)	6.49	Emmanuel Bianchi (BRA)	6.455
Shot put	Benjamín Acevedo (CHI)	12.275	Jorge Llobet Cullen (ARG)	12.175	Fernando Capellini (URU)	11.835
Discus throw	David Martín Estévez (URU)	39.25	Jorge Llobet Cullen (ARG)	39.14	Benjamín Acevedo (CHI)	38.14
Hammer throw	Jorge Llobet Cullen (ARG)	41.29	Domingo Spirito (ARG)	39.24	Osvaldo Garay (ARG)	36.35
Javelin throw	Willy Seewald (BRA)	56.885	Arturo Medina (CHI)	50.30	Hernán Orrego (CHI)	44.76
Pentathlon	Emmanuel Bianchi (BRA)		Guillermo Newbery (ARG); Enrique Thompson (ARG)			
4 × 100 metres relay	Argentina	44.0	Brazil	45.2	Chile	
4 × 400 metres relay**						
Cross country 10,000 metres	Manuel Plaza (CHI)	34:56.6	Florides Castillo (CHI)		Luis Celis (CHI)	

* = race void as Chilean athletes refused to re-run after false start by winner whilst two other runners infringed lane; original result 1 Ramiro García (CHI) 22.8, 2 Eduardo Albe (ARG), 3 Carlos Bastos (URU)

** = race void as crowd infringed on track; original result 1 Uruguay 3:31.2u, 2 Argentina, 3 Brazil

== Medal table (unofficial) ==
* Host nation (Brazil)

Rank	Nation	Gold	Silver	Bronze	Total
1	Argentina (ARG)	8	6	6	20
2	Chile (CHI)	7	7	6	20
3	Uruguay (URU)	3	2	3	8
4	Brazil (BRA)*	2	6	4	12
Totals (4 entries)		20	21	19	60
