= Sport in Argentina =

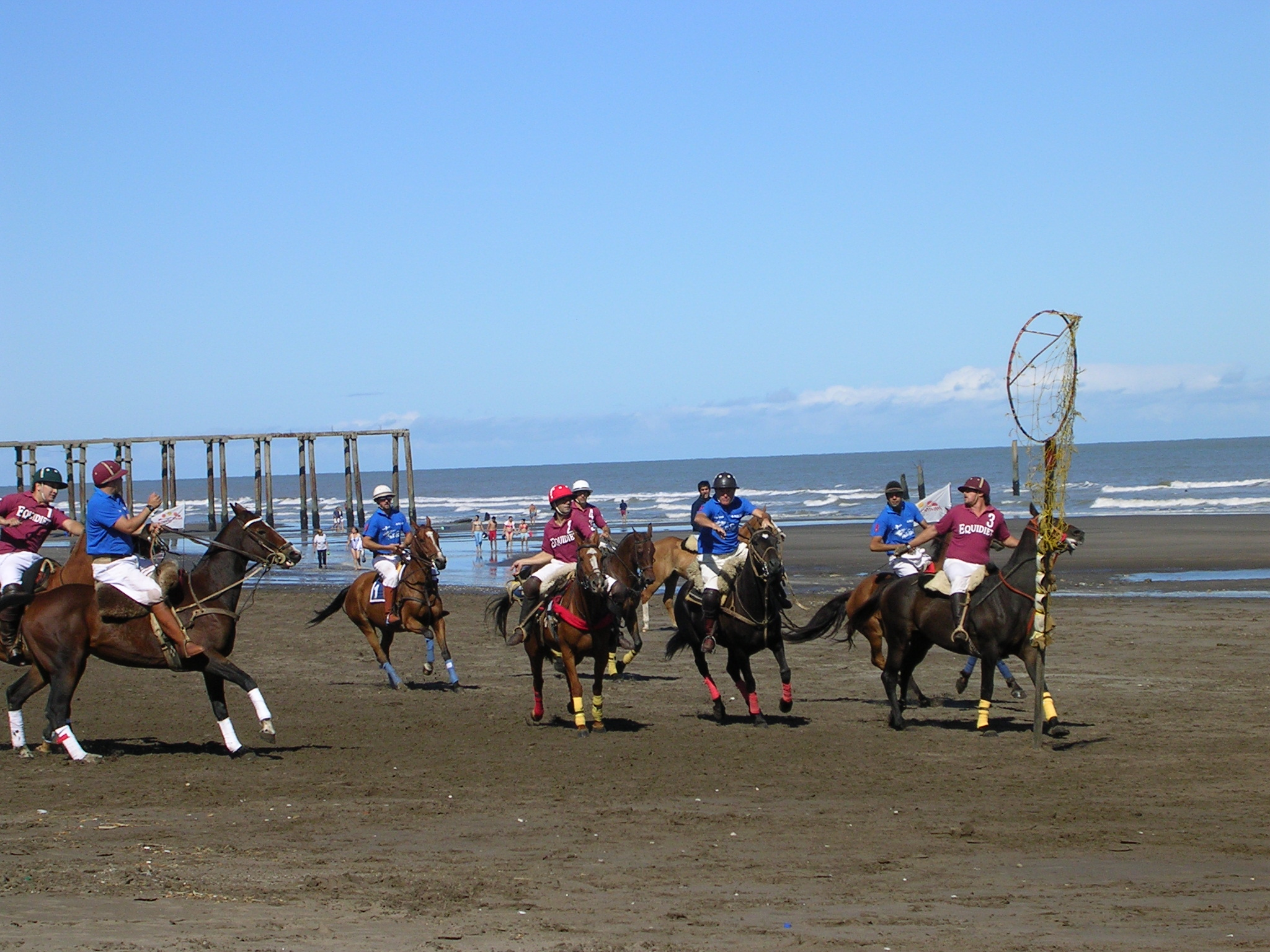
Pato is the national sport in Argentina.

The practice of sports in Argentina is varied due to the population's diverse European origins and the mostly mild climate. Association football is the most popular discipline. Other sports played both professionally and recreatively include athletics, auto racing, basketball, boxing, cycling, field hockey, fishing, golf, handball, mountaineering, mountain biking, padel tennis, polo, roller hockey, rowing, rugby union, sailing, skiing, swimming, tennis, and volleyball. Argentine achievements can be found in team sports such as association football, basketball, field hockey and rugby union, and individual sports such as boxing, golf, tennis and rowing. Pato, the national sport, is not very popular.

Argentina is one of the most important sport powers in the region, ending at the top of the medal count at the South American Games since 1978, with exceptions in 2002 and 2010. In the all-time medal table of the Pan American Games, Argentina holds second place among South American countries and fifth place in the Americas, behind the United States, Canada, Brazil and Cuba. Despite a relative lack of success at the Olympic level in more traditional sports like athletics, swimming, and gymnastics, Argentina has had successful participations in other sports like association football, basketball, field hockey, roller hockey, padel tennis, polo and rugby union.

== Football ==
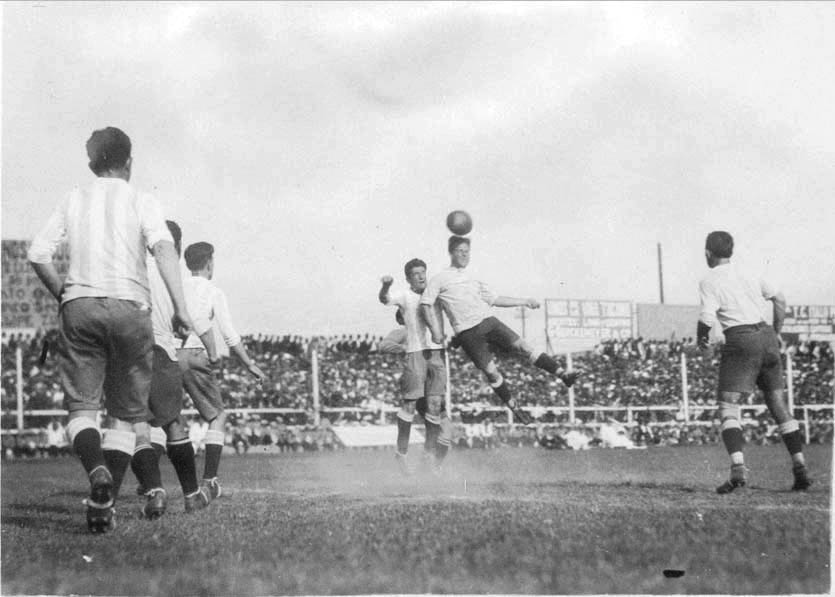
Argentina playing against Uruguay in 1927. The Clásico del Río de la Plata is one of the oldest derbies in the world.

Football is the most popular sport in Argentina and part of the country's culture. The sport is played by children during breaks at school and by grown-ups on the plenty of both indoor and outdoor fields located throughout the country.

The national team has won the FIFA World Cup three times (in 1978, 1986 and 2022), successive Olympic gold medals (in 2004 and 2008), a record sixteen Copa América, one Confederations Cup and six World Youth Championships. Argentine clubs have won the Copa Libertadores, the top continental competition, a record 25 times and the Intercontinental Cup or FIFA Club World Cup 9 times, a record shared with Brazilian clubs. The Argentine Primera División is the top level domestic competition. The country's most famed football idols are Diego Maradona and Lionel Messi, both of whom captained the national team to a World Cup trophy.

Argentina's fiercest rival is Brazil and their rivalry is sometimes known as the "Battle of the South Americans". They have played each other numerous times in the Copa América and the Confederations Cup, and their clubs have met several times in the Copa Libertadores finals. Argentina is one of the few national teams in association football that have beaten Brazil on a regular basis. Argentine and Brazilian national youth teams have also met at various tournaments. At the 2008 Summer Olympics, the under-23 teams met in the semi-finals, with Argentina winning 3–0 in a hard-fought game. In addition, the aforementioned Maradona has been often compared with Brazilian iconic player Pelé.

Women's football is far behind in terms of popularity and professionalism. However, the women's national team has competed in the South American Championship since 1995, finishing as runner-up three times before winning the competition in 2006 with a 5–0 victory over Brazil. The national team also played in the 2003 and the 2007 FIFA Women's World Cups, but they finished last in the group on both occasions.

== Basketball ==
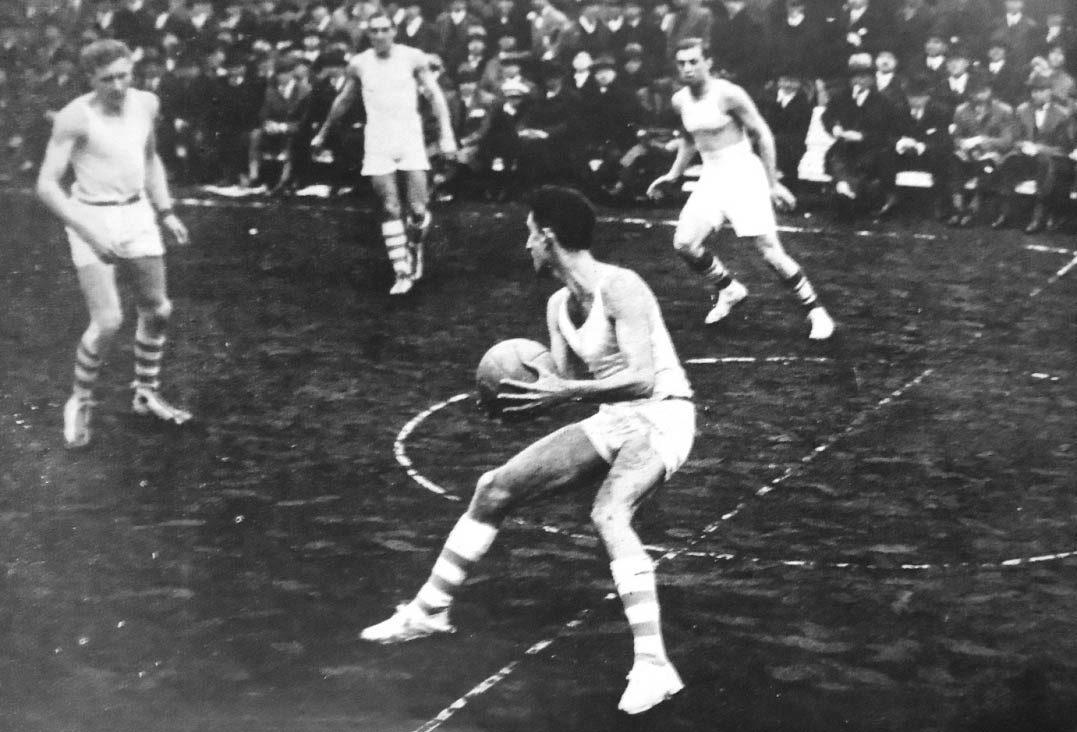
Argentina and Uruguay national teams, playing in 1925

Basketball is a very popular sport, mostly in the provinces of Argentina. The Basketball Clubs' Association organizes the Liga Nacional de Básquet, the top-level league in the country. Although the National team won the first FIBA World Championship in 1950, the sport did not gain country-wide popularity until the 2000s, when the national team conquered the Olympic gold medal at the 2004 Summer Olympics and had a good performance in the 2002, 2006, 2010 World Championships finishing on the second, fourth, fifth position respectively. The national team also won the bronze medal at the 2008 Summer Olympics. At the 2019 World Championship, the national team finished second again. The national team has won the FIBA AmeriCup in 2001, 2011 and 2022.

Argentine NBA star Manu Ginóbili also won NBA Championship rings in 2003, 2005, 2007 and 2014 as a member of the San Antonio Spurs, the 2007 victory included his compatriot Fabricio Oberto.

Although women's basketball is not professional in Argentina, the national team participates in most international competitions, reaching their highest point at the 2006 FIBA World Championship for Women where they finished in the 9th place.

== Rugby union ==
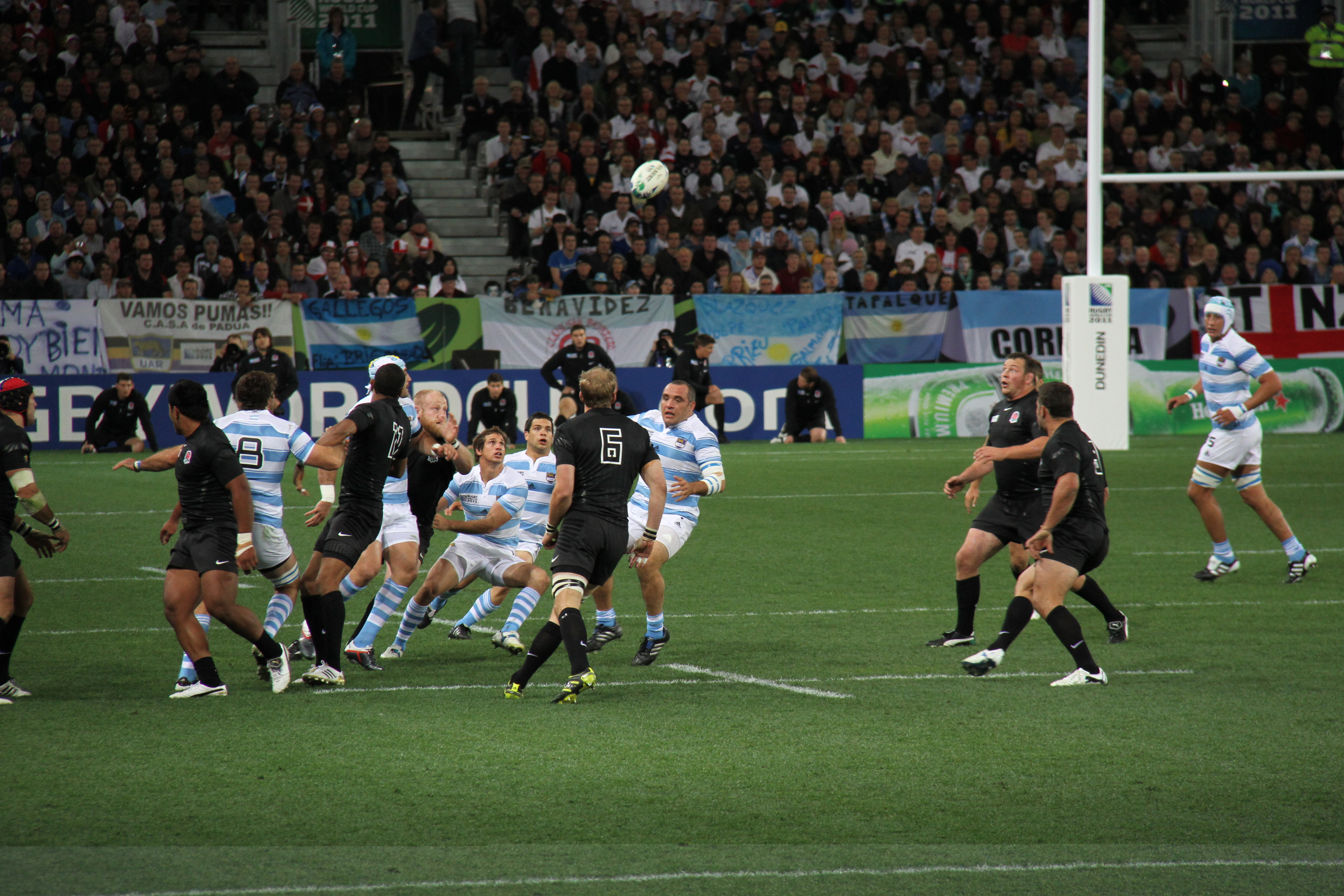
Argentina facing England at the 2011 Rugby World Cup.

Rugby union is a popular and largely amateur sport. However, despite this amateurism, the national team have become one of the most powerful in the sport, finishing third in the 2007 Rugby World Cup and rising as high as third in the World Rugby Rankings (then known as the IRB World Rankings) immediately after. As of 2020, they have defeated every Tier 1 rugby nation.

For the first 20 years of the sport's professional era, dating from 1996, most important Argentine players have emigrated to Europe (mainly to England and France). Probably the best known players are 1970s and 1980s star Hugo Porta; Agustín Pichot, Pumas captain during their 2007 World Cup run and now the vice chairman of World Rugby; his successor as captain, Felipe Contepomi; current star utility back Juan Martín Hernández; 1990s star and later Pumas head coach Santiago Phelan; Marcelo Loffreda, who coached the team during their 2007 World Cup run before leaving to take up the coaching post at English club power Leicester Tigers. The current head coach is previously mentioned Felipe Contepomi.

In 2012, Argentina joined New Zealand, Australia and South Africa in the Tri Nations Championship, which then became The Rugby Championship. In 2014, Argentina took their first victory in this competition against Australia in the first round. Argentina further cemented its links with SANZAAR when the country was added to that body's Super Rugby competition, which added teams based in Argentina and Japan in 2016.

== Tennis ==
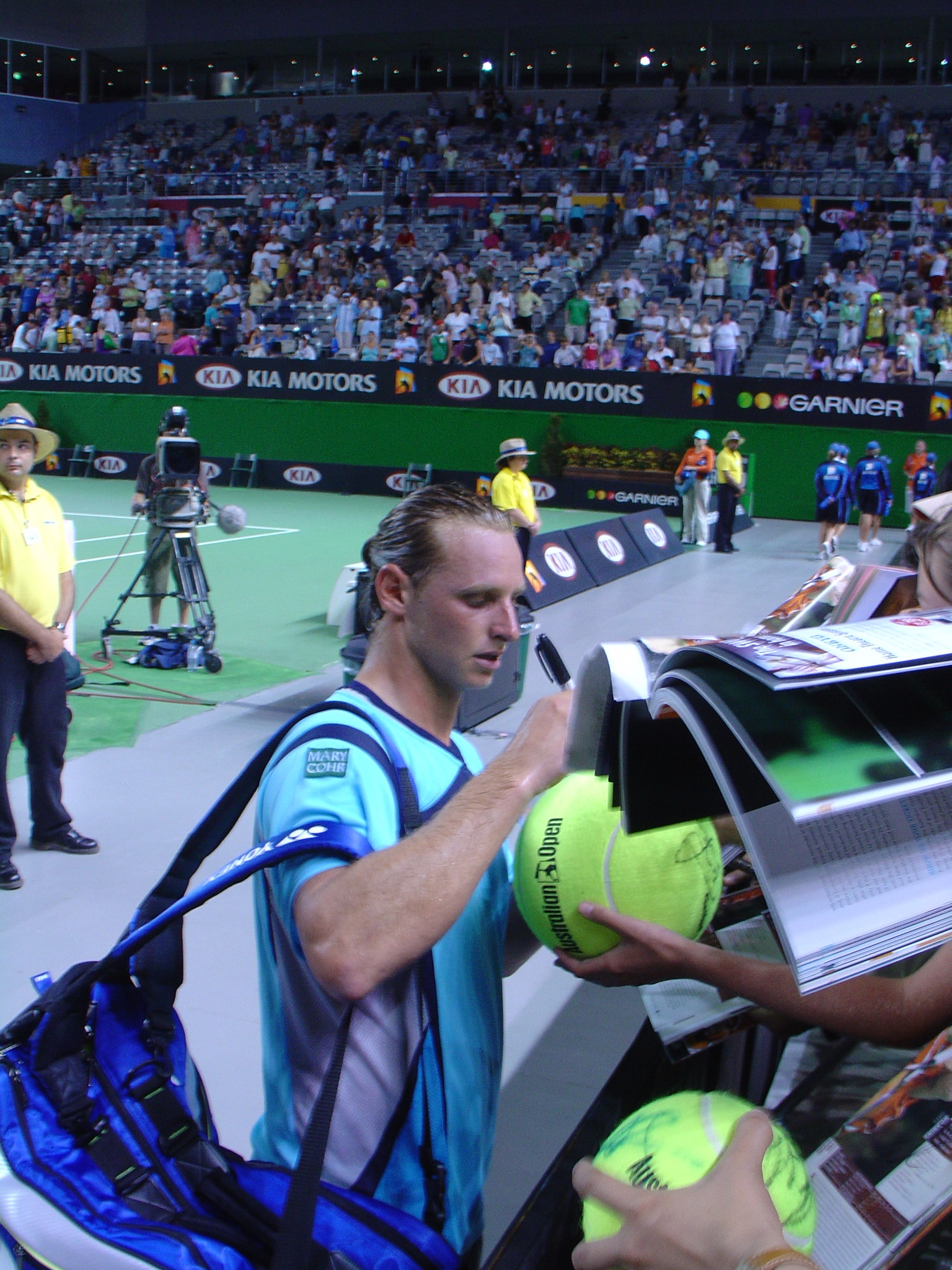
David Nalbandian and fans at the 2006 Australian Open.

Tennis has been quite popular among people of all ages since the 1970s and is the 2nd largest sport in Argentina, behind football, after both Guillermo Vilas and later Gabriela Sabatini in the 1980s reached the number 2 position and won several Grand Slams. Even though no Argentine player has thus far reached the first place at the ATP rankings, many Argentines have been among the most important in the circuit. During the 2000s a number of Argentine players were among the top 10 and the 2004 French Open featured an all-Argentine final. Gastón Gaudio won the Roland Garros in 2004. At the 2005 Tennis Masters Cup, David Nalbandian defeated world number 1 Roger Federer and the tournament gathered 4 Argentine players, an all-time record for any nationality. Most recently, Juan Martín del Potro has emerged as one of the leading players in the world, having won the 2009 US Open a few days before his 21st birthday. Argentina has won the World Team Cup four times, in 1980, 2002, 2007 and 2010 and has reached the semifinals of the Davis Cup 7 times in the last 10 years, losing the finals against Russia in 2006 and Spain in 2008 and 2011; the Argentine team also played the final in 1981, where they lost against the United States. The national squad won the 2016 Davis Cup.

== Field hockey ==
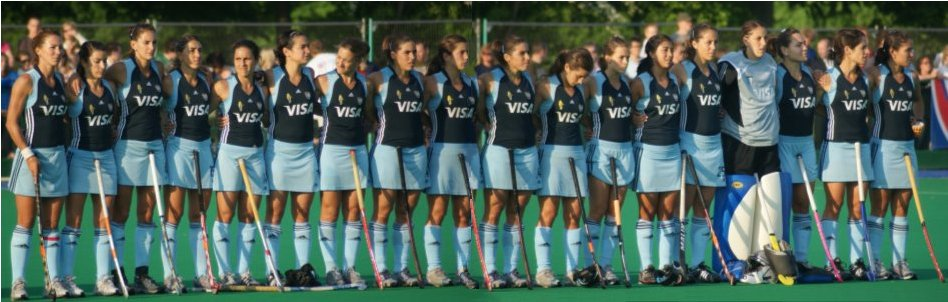
Las Leonas, the women's national team.

The women's national team Las Leonas is one of the world's most successful, with five Olympic medals, three World Cups, a World League and seven Champions Trophy. The national team won the World Cup in 2002, 2010 and 2026. At the Olympic Games, it won the silver medal in 2000, 2012 and 2020, as well as bronze in 2004 and 2008. Las Leonas also won the annual Champions Trophy on seven occasions, in 2001, 2008, 2009, 2010, 2012, 2014 and 2016 and the World League 2014-2015. Luciana Aymar is recognized as the best female player in the history of the sport, being the only player to have received the FIH Player of the Year Award eight times.

The men's national team Los Leones won the gold medal at the 2016 Summer Olympics and the bronze medal at the 2014 World Cup, 2026 World Cup and 2008 Champions Trophy. The national squad also won Pan American Games on eleven occasions and the 2005, 2007 and 2012 Champions Challenges.

== Roller hockey ==
Roller hockey is mainly played in the Cuyo region (especially in San Juan Province). Argentine players have an international quality, with the men's national team winning six Roller Hockey World Cup titles. The women's national team is the world's most successful team, having won six titles.

== Auto racing ==
From rallying to Formula One, auto racing is a sport followed by a number of fans in Argentina. Formula One legend Juan Manuel Fangio was five times Formula One world champion under four different teams, winning 102 of his 184 international races, and is widely ranked as the greatest driver of all time. Other distinguished racers were Oscar Alfredo Gálvez, Juan Gálvez, José Froilán González, and Carlos Reutemann. Years after Fangio's career was over, Carlos Reutemann was the best known Argentine driver of the 1970s. More recently José María López has emerged as one of the world's top touring car drivers, winning the World Touring Car Championship in 2014, 2015 and 2016. Argentine competitions include the TC 2000 and Turismo Carretera road racing series, as well as Rally Argentina of the World Rally Championship. Argentina has also hosted the 2009, 2010, 2011, 2012, 2013 2014, 2015, 2016, 2017 and 2018 editions of the Dakar Rally. Former events include the defunct Formula One Argentine Grand Prix and World Sportscar Championship's 1000 km Buenos Aires. In Formula One, Argentina is currently represented by Franco Colapinto, racing for Alpine since the 2025 Emilia Romagna Grand Prix, having been promoted from the role of reserve driver to replace Jack Doohan, and has achieved a season-best result of eleventh at the Dutch Grand Prix. Colapinto previously drove for Williams in 2024, replacing Logan Sargeant at the Italian Grand Prix, as an interim for the incoming Carlos Sainz Jr., and scored points at the Azerbaijan and United States Grands Prix.

== Boxing ==
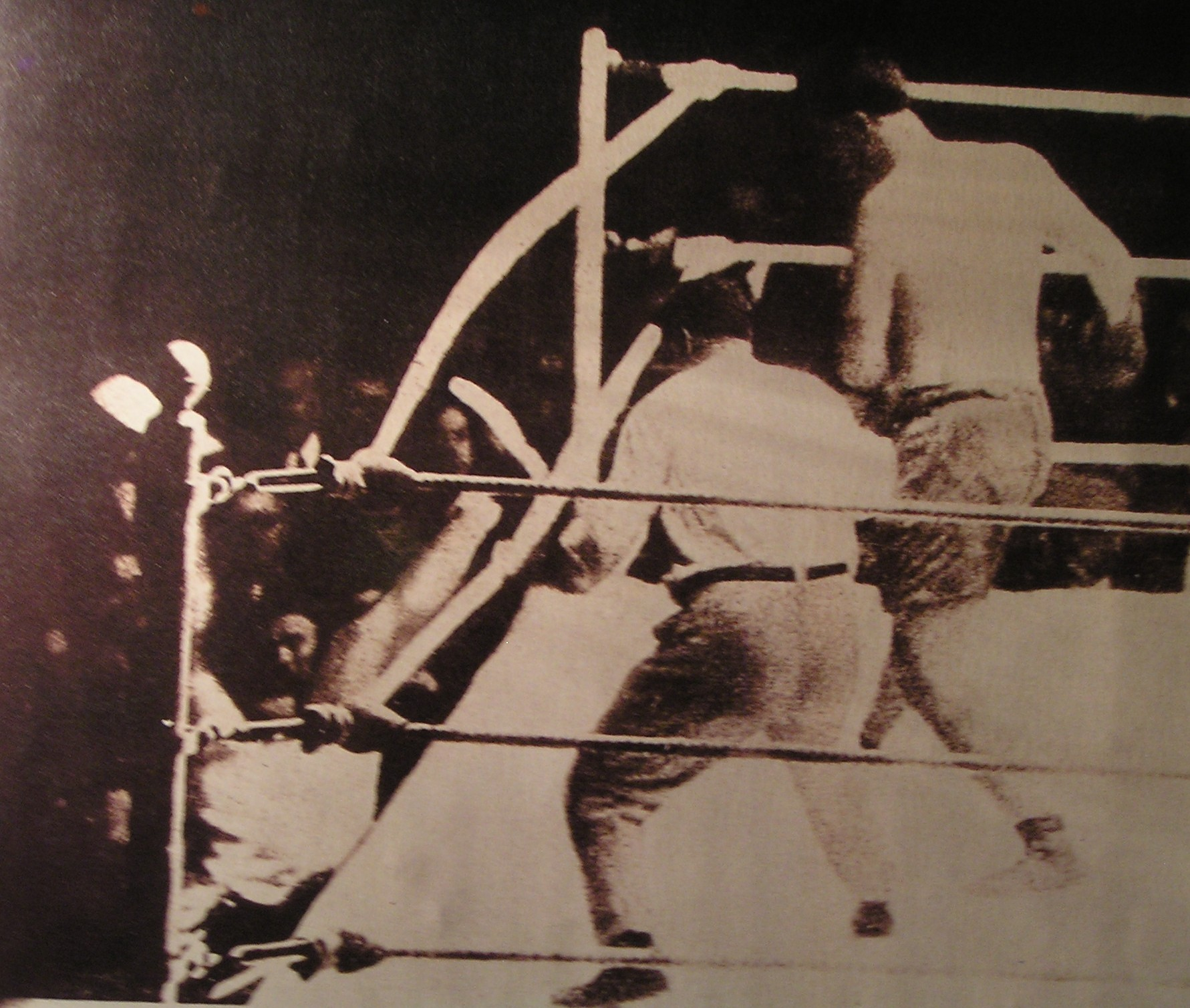
Luis Firpo throws Jack Dempsey out of the ring in 1923; this was the basis for artist George Wesley Bellows' famous portrait.

Pascual Pérez was Argentina's first world boxing champion. There are Argentine boxing legends such as Carlos Monzón, Horacio Accavallo, Santos Laciar, Juan Martín Coggi and Nicolino Locche who held the world champion's title in their categories. Argentine boxers have, as of 2004, earned 24 Olympic medals, including seven gold medals.

Argentine boxer Victor Galindez was the third Latin American to win the world's Light-Heavyweight title (after Puerto Rico's José Torres and Venezuela's Vicente Rondon, WBA-recognized champion during the middle of the 1970s). Galindez died after he was run over by a car during an auto racing competition in which he took part.

In 1994, WBA world Middleweight champion Jorge Castro knocked out John David Jackson in the ninth round to retain his title in Monterrey, Mexico. Since Castro was on the brink of suffering a technical knockout loss when he won the fight, the punch with which he beat Jackson has become known as boxing's version of Diego Maradona's Hand of God goal.

Marcela Acuña is a world champion female boxer, and arguably one of the most popular fighters of the 2000s in Argentina.

Other fighters, such as Oscar Bonavena, Juan Roldán, and Luis Firpo, did not win world championships, but were also popular among boxing fans during their years as professional fighters.

On 17 April 2010, Sergio Martínez outpointed American Kelly Pavlik in Atlantic City to become the lineal Middleweight champion of the world.

Marcos René Maidana has also been champion in 2009, 2010, 2011 and 2012.

== Cricket ==
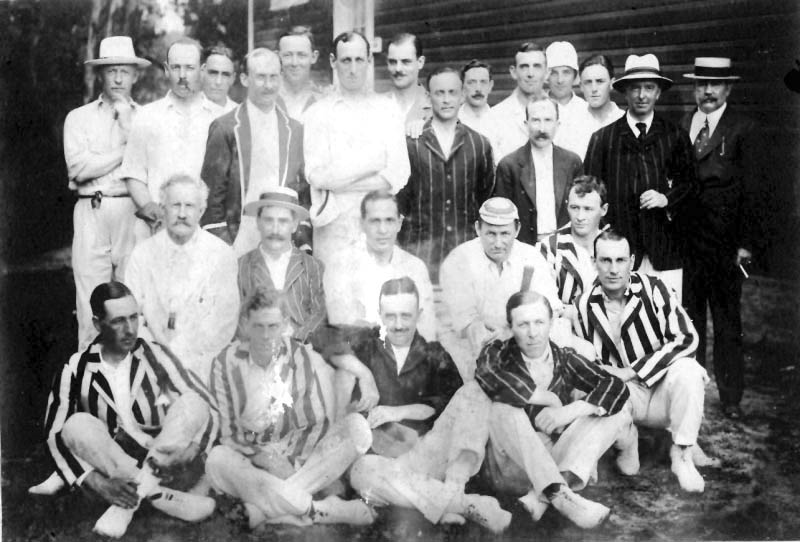
Buenos Aires C.C. and Rosario C.C. players posing together during a game, 1916.

Cricket has been played in Argentina since 1806, with the international side making its first appearance in 1868, against the Uruguay national team. The sport regained some popularity, due to the national team's participation at the World Cricket League, and the Argentina national women's cricket team at the Women's version of the ICC Americas Championship. Though cricket is a minor sport, Argentina is the strongest team in mainland South America, and are currently playing in division 7 of the World Cricket League. There is a huge scope of development of the sport in this country, given that there are a large number of British descendants in Argentina. Argentina also dominates the South American Cricket Championship.

== Golf ==
Among the best in South America, the first prominent figure of this sport in Argentina was José Jurado. He was the first Argentine to travel to major international championships and is thus often credited as the "Father of Argentine Professional Golf".

Other notable Argentine golfers include Roberto De Vicenzo, Antonio Cerdá, José Cóceres, Eduardo Romero, Ángel Cabrera, Andrés Romero and Ricardo González. De Vicenzo and Cerdá won the 1953 Canada Cup. In history, Argentine golfers won three Majors, Roberto De Vicenzo the British Open in 1967, and Ángel Cabrera the U.S. Open in 2007 and the Augusta Masters in 2009.

== Handball ==
Although handball in Argentina lacks the popularity of this sport on the European continent, both in terms of infrastructure and federated players, the Handball is a firmly growing sport in Argentina with the men's national team regularly qualifying for the World Championship. Argentina has started producing world class talent, such as the brothers Diego and Sebastián Simonet.

The Men's national handball team won the gold medal at the 2011 Pan American Games and at the 2019 Pan American Games and seven Pan American Handball Championships.

== Padel tennis ==
Padel tennis is played by four and a half million amateur players in thirty five thousand courts; it is the most participated sport in Argentina. Professional players compete in National Circuit of tournaments. Argentina won 19 titles at the Padel Tennis World Championship (between women and men).

== Polo ==
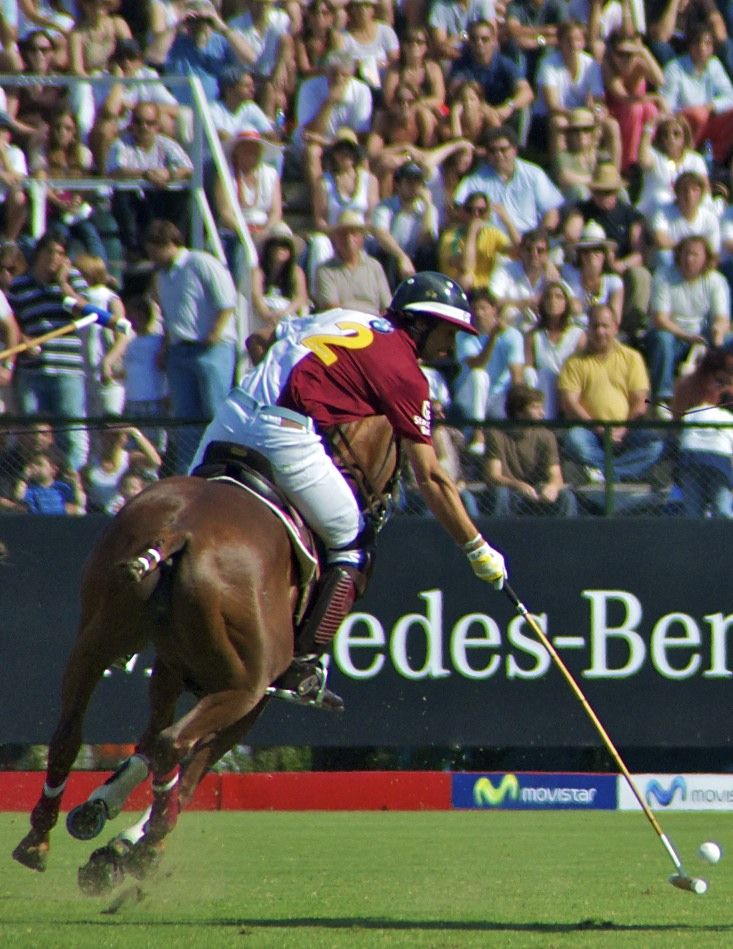
Argentine Polo Open Championship.

Argentina's polo team won their first Olympic gold medal in 1924 and the second gold medal in 1936. Adolfo Cambiaso, Gonzalo Pieres, his brother Facundo, the Novillo Astrada brothers, the Heguy's, and Tommy Iriarte are currently ranked amongst the best polo players in the world. The three most important polo tournaments in the world, the Argentine Open, the Hurlingham Open, and the Tortugas Open are held in Argentina. Historically, Argentina has always been a leading country in this sport, and has been uninterrupted world champions since 1949 and Argentine players comprise most of the world's top ten players. Argentina has won five World Polo Championship.

== Sailing ==
Argentina won 10 Olympic medals in sailing (1 gold, 4 silver, 5 bronze), the Argentinian experience and level in this sport is high, even between young children competing in optimist class boats. Carlos Espínola is the sailor who won most Olympic medals in this sport with four. Santiago Lange won the World Championship on four occasions (1985, 1993, 1995 and 2004) and the gold medal at the 2016 Summer Olympics.

== Volleyball ==
Volleyball has a professional male league. Argentina national volleyball team's best achievements are the bronze medals at the 1988 Summer Olympics, 2020 Summer Olympics and 1982 FIVB Volleyball Men's World Championship. The male team is usually ranked by the FIVB among the top 10 national teams in the world.

The national team also won the gold medal at the Pan American Games in three occasions (1995, 2015 and 2019).

Argentina featured national teams in beach volleyball that competed at the 2018–2020 CSV Beach Volleyball Continental Cup in both the women's and the men's sections.

== Water polo ==
Argentina's women's national under-20 water polo team made its debut at the 2021 FINA Junior Water Polo World Championships.

== Olympic Games ==
Argentina was one of eight founding members of the International Olympic Committee, and first participated in the Olympic Games in 1900 with one single athlete. Argentine Olympic competitors have, from 1900 to 2016, garnered 77 medals (21 gold, 26 silver, 30 bronze); from 1924 to 1952, its athletes had good showings, giving the Argentine delegations global ranks of between 16th and 19th. From 1956 to 2000, however, Argentina did not win any gold medals, a situation that was reversed in 2004, when it acquired two and further so, in 2008, 2012 and 2016.

On 4 July 2013, Buenos Aires was selected as host city for the 2018 Summer Youth Olympics.

== Team nicknames ==
Sport	Team	Nickname	Translation	Ref.
Association football	Men's	La albiceleste	The white and sky blue	
Basketball	Men's	El alma	The soul	
Basketball	Women's	Las gigantes	The giants	
Cricket	Women's	Las flamingos	The flamingos	
Field hockey	Women's	Las leonas	The lionesses	
Field hockey	Women's u-21	Las leoncitas	The little lionesses	
Field hockey	Men's	Los leones	The lions	
Handball	Men's	Los gladiadores	The gladiators	
Paralympic association football	Men's	Los murciélagos	The bats	
Roller hockey (Quad)	Women's	Las águilas	The eagles	
Rugby union	Men's	Los pumas	The pumas	
Rugby union	Men's second team	Argentina XV	Argentina XV	
Rugby union	Men's u-20	Los pumitas	The little pumas	
Tennis	Men's	La legión	The legion	
Volleyball	Women's	Las panteras	The panthers	

== International events ==
Argentina has hosted a wide range of international competitions, among them:

Key
A: Partially or wholly hosted in Avellaneda
B: Partially or wholly hosted in Buenos Aires
C: Partially or wholly hosted in Córdoba
E: Partially or wholly hosted in Esperanza
J: Partially or wholly hosted in Jujuy
LP: Partially or wholly hosted in La Plata
MP: Partially or wholly hosted in Mar del Plata
M: Partially or wholly hosted in Mendoza
N: Partially or wholly hosted in Neuquén
Q: Partially or wholly hosted in Quilmes
R: Partially or wholly hosted in Rosario
S: Partially or wholly hosted in Salta
SJ: Partially or wholly hosted in San Juan
SF: Partially or wholly hosted in Santa Fe
TA: Partially or wholly hosted in Tandil
TI: Partially or wholly hosted in Tigre
TU: Partially or wholly hosted in San Miguel de Tucumán
V: Partially or wholly hosted in Villa Ballester

Sport	Event	Year	A	B	C	E	J	LP	MP	M	N	Q	R	S	SJ	SF	TA	TI	TU	V
Amateur wrestling	FILA Wrestling World Championships	1969	No	No	No	No	No	No	Yes	No	No	No	No	No	No	No	No	No	No	No
Association football	Copa América	1916	Yes	Yes	No	No	No	No	No	No	No	No	No	No	No	No	No	No	No	No
Association football	Copa América	1921	No	Yes	No	No	No	No	No	No	No	No	No	No	No	No	No	No	No	No
Association football	Copa América	1925	No	Yes	No	No	No	No	No	No	No	No	No	No	No	No	No	No	No	No
Association football	Copa América	1929	Yes	Yes	No	No	No	No	No	No	No	No	No	No	No	No	No	No	No	No
Association football	Copa América	1937	No	Yes	No	No	No	No	No	No	No	No	No	No	No	No	No	No	No	No
Association football	Copa América	1946	Yes	Yes	No	No	No	No	No	No	No	No	No	No	No	No	No	No	No	No
Association football	Copa América	1959	No	Yes	No	No	No	No	No	No	No	No	No	No	No	No	No	No	No	No
Association football	Copa América	1987	No	Yes	Yes	No	No	No	No	No	No	No	Yes	No	No	No	No	No	No	No
Association football	Copa América	2011	No	Yes	Yes	No	Yes	Yes	No	Yes	No	No	No	Yes	Yes	Yes	No	No	No	No
Association football	FIFA U-20 World Cup	2001	No	Yes	Yes	No	No	No	Yes	Yes	No	No	Yes	Yes	No	No	No	No	No	No
Association football	FIFA World Cup	1978	No	Yes	Yes	No	No	No	Yes	Yes	No	No	Yes	No	No	No	No	No	No	No
Association football	South American Youth Championship	1988	No	Yes	No	No	No	No	No	No	No	No	No	No	No	No	No	No	No	No
Association football	South American Youth Championship	1999	No	No	No	No	No	No	Yes	No	No	No	No	No	No	No	Yes	No	No	No
Association football	South American Women's Championship	1998	No	No	No	No	No	No	Yes	No	No	No	No	No	No	No	No	No	No	No
Association football	South American Women's Championship	2006	No	No	No	No	No	No	Yes	No	No	No	No	No	No	No	No	No	No	No
Athletics	South American Championships	1918	No	Yes	No	No	No	No	No	No	No	No	No	No	No	No	No	No	No	No
Athletics	South American Championships	1924	No	Yes	No	No	No	No	No	No	No	No	No	No	No	No	No	No	No	No
Athletics	South American Championships	1931	No	Yes	No	No	No	No	No	No	No	No	No	No	No	No	No	No	No	No
Athletics	South American Championships	1941	No	Yes	No	No	No	No	No	No	No	No	No	No	No	No	No	No	No	No
Athletics	South American Championships	1952	No	Yes	No	No	No	No	No	No	No	No	No	No	No	No	No	No	No	No
Athletics	South American Championships	1967	No	Yes	No	No	No	No	No	No	No	No	No	No	No	No	No	No	No	No
Athletics	South American Championships	1983	No	No	No	No	No	No	No	No	No	No	No	No	No	Yes	No	No	No	No
Athletics	South American Championships	1997	No	No	No	No	No	No	Yes	No	No	No	No	No	No	No	No	No	No	No
Athletics	South American Championships	2011	No	Yes	No	No	No	No	No	No	No	No	No	No	No	No	No	No	No	No
Basketball	FIBA Americas Championship	1995	No	No	No	No	No	No	No	No	Yes	No	No	No	No	No	No	No	Yes	No
Basketball	FIBA Americas Championship	2001	No	No	No	No	No	No	No	No	Yes	No	No	No	No	No	No	No	No	No
Basketball	FIBA Americas Championship	2011	No	No	No	No	No	No	Yes	No	No	No	No	No	No	No	No	No	No	No
Basketball	FIBA Basketball World Cup	1950	No	Yes	No	No	No	No	No	No	No	No	No	No	No	No	No	No	No	No
Basketball	FIBA Basketball World Cup	1990	No	Yes	Yes	No	No	No	No	No	No	No	Yes	Yes	No	Yes	No	No	No	Yes
Basketball	FIBA Under-21 World Championship	2005	No	No	Yes	No	No	No	Yes	No	No	No	No	No	No	No	No	No	No	No
Fencing	World Fencing Championships	1962	No	Yes	No	No	No	No	No	No	No	No	No	No	No	No	No	No	No	No
Fencing	World Fencing Championships	1977	No	Yes	No	No	No	No	No	No	No	No	No	No	No	No	No	No	No	No
Field hockey	Men's Hockey Champions Challenge	2009	No	No	No	No	No	No	No	No	No	No	No	Yes	No	No	No	No	No	No
Field hockey	Women's Champions Trophy	1995	No	No	No	No	No	No	Yes	No	No	No	No	No	No	No	No	No	No	No
Field hockey	Women's Champions Trophy	2004	No	No	No	No	No	No	No	No	No	No	Yes	No	No	No	No	No	No	No
Field hockey	Women's Champions Trophy	2007	No	No	No	No	No	No	No	No	No	Yes	No	No	No	No	No	No	No	No
Field hockey	Women's Champions Trophy	2012	No	No	No	No	No	No	No	No	No	No	Yes	No	No	No	No	No	No	No
Field hockey	Women's Champions Trophy	2014	No	No	No	No	No	No	No	No	No	No	Yes	No	No	No	No	No	No	No
Field hockey	Men's Hockey World Cup	1978	No	Yes	No	No	No	No	No	No	No	No	No	No	No	No	No	No	No	No
Field hockey	Women's Hockey World Cup	1981	No	Yes	No	No	No	No	No	No	No	No	No	No	No	No	No	No	No	No
Field hockey	Women's Hockey World Cup	2010	No	No	No	No	No	No	No	No	No	No	Yes	No	No	No	No	No	No	No
Motorsport	Formula One	1953-1998	No	Yes	No	No	No	No	No	No	No	No	No	No	No	No	No	No	No	No
Shooting	ISSF World Shooting Championships	1903	No	Yes	No	No	No	No	No	No	No	No	No	No	No	No	No	No	No	No
Shooting	ISSF World Shooting Championships	1949	No	Yes	No	No	No	No	No	No	No	No	No	No	No	No	No	No	No	No
Volleyball	FIVB Volleyball Men's World Championship	1982	No	Yes	No	No	No	No	No	No	No	No	No	No	No	No	No	No	No	No
Volleyball	FIVB Volleyball Men's World Championship	2002	No	Yes	Yes	No	No	No	Yes	No	No	No	No	Yes	Yes	Yes	No	No	No	No
Multi-sport event	South American Games	1982	No	Yes	No	Yes	No	No	No	No	No	No	Yes	No	No	Yes	No	No	No	No
Multi-sport event	South American Games	2006	No	Yes	No	No	No	No	Yes	No	No	No	No	No	No	No	No	No	No	No
Multi-sport event	Pan American Games	1951	Yes	Yes	No	No	No	No	No	No	No	No	No	No	No	No	No	Yes	No	No
Multi-sport event	Pan American Games	1995	No	Yes	No	No	No	No	Yes	No	No	No	No	No	No	Yes	Yes	No	No	No

== Sports Originating in Argentina ==
The following sports originated in Argentina:

- Cestoball
- Pato
- Tejo

== Bibliography ==
- Nauright, John; Parrish, Charles, eds. (2012). Sports around the World: History, Culture, and Practice. Vol. 3. Santa Barbara, CA: ABC-CLIO. ISBN 978-1598843019.
- Dougall, Angus (2013). The Greatest Racing Driver. Bloomington, IN, USA: Balboa Press. ISBN 978-1452510965.
- Arbena, Joseph (1999). Latin American sport: an annotated bibliography, 1988-1998. Bibliographies and indexes on sports history. Vol. 3. Westport, CT: Greenwood Press. ISBN 978-0-3132-9611-6.
- Arbena, Joseph (2002). "In Search of the Latin American Female Athlete". In Arbena, Joseph; LaFrance, David Gerald (eds.). Sport in Latin America and the Caribbean. Lanham, MD, USA: Rowman & Littlefield. pp. 219–232. ISBN 978-0842028219.

== See also ==
- List of Argentine sports governing bodies
- Sport in Brazil
