= Óscar Alvarado (athlete) =

Chilean sprinter

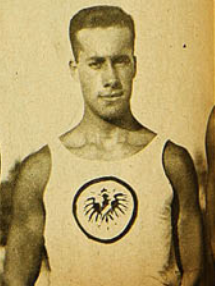

Personal information
- Nationality: Chilean
- Born: 1909
- Died: 14 June 1965 (aged 55–56)

Sport
- Sport: Sprinting
- Event: 100 metres
Medal record
Men's athletics
Representing Chile
South American Championships
Gold medal – first place	1927 Santiago	long jump

Óscar Alvarado (1909 – 14 June 1965) was a Chilean sprinter. He competed in the men's 100 metres at the 1928 Summer Olympics.
