= José Salinas =

Javier Martínez may refer to:

- José Salinas (footballer) (born 2000), Spanish footballer
- José Vicente Salinas (1909–1975), Chilean sprinter
