= Pedro Goić =

Croatian hammer thrower

Personal information
- Nationality: Croatian
- Born: 23 March 1896 Pražnice, Austria-Hungary
- Died: 19 January 1995 (aged 98) Zagreb, Croatia

Sport
- Sport: Athletics
- Event: Hammer throw

Petar "Pedro" Goić (23 March 1896 – 19 January 1995) was a Croatian-Chilean track and field athlete who specialised in the hammer throw. He competed in the men's hammer throw at the 1936 Summer Olympics, representing Yugoslavia.

After migrating to Chile, he won the silver medal in the hammer behind Federico Kleger at the 1927 South American Championships in Athletics, before going on to best Kleger to the gold medal at the 1931 South American Championships in Athletics. Upon his return to Yugoslavia he placed ninth at the 1934 European Championships.
