= Fernando Chacarelli =

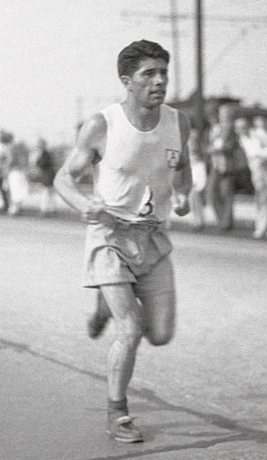

Personal information
- Born: 18 July 1905 Oliva, Córdoba, Argentina
- Died: 26 April 1984 (aged 78) Córdoba, Argentina
- Height: 172 cm (5 ft 8 in)
- Weight: 64 kg (141 lb)

Sport
- Sport: Athletics
- Event: 3000 m – marathon

Achievements and titles
- Personal best: 1000 m – 31:55.0 (1932)
Medal record
Representing Argentina
South American Championships in Athletics
Bronze medal – third place	1926 Montevideo	3000 m
Bronze medal – third place	1926 Montevideo	5000 m
Silver medal – second place	1927 Santiago	3000 m
Silver medal – second place	1929 Lima	10,000 m
Bronze medal – third place	1929 Lima	Cross country
Gold medal – first place	1931 Buenos Aires	Cross country
Silver medal – second place	1933 Montevideo	Cross country
Bronze medal – third place	1933 Montevideo	Road race

Fernando Chacarelli (18 July 1905 – 26 April 1984) was an Argentinean runner who won eight medals at the South American athletics championships, including the gold medal in cross country running in 1931. He was selected for the 1928 Summer Olympics, but did not compete because the national Olympic Committee could not sponsor long-distance runners at those games. He was placed 12th in the 10,000 m and 17th in the marathon at the 1932 Summer Olympics.

Chacarelli competed throughout his career under the surname of Cicarelli, though he signed autographs as Chacarelli. In 1924 he set a new Argentinean record over 3000 m, and in 1926–27 won a bronze and a silver medal in this event at the South American athletics championships. In 1927 he also placed second in the 5000 m, but was disqualified for allegedly elbowing a competitor. Chacarelli believed he did not do so, and disappointingly withdrew from the cross-country event. In 1932 he set new South American records over 15 km, 20 km and 25 km distances. He retired the next year and later worked as a physical education teacher. An annual marathon race is held in his honor in his native city of Cordoba.
