= Valerio Vallania =

Argentinian athletics competitor

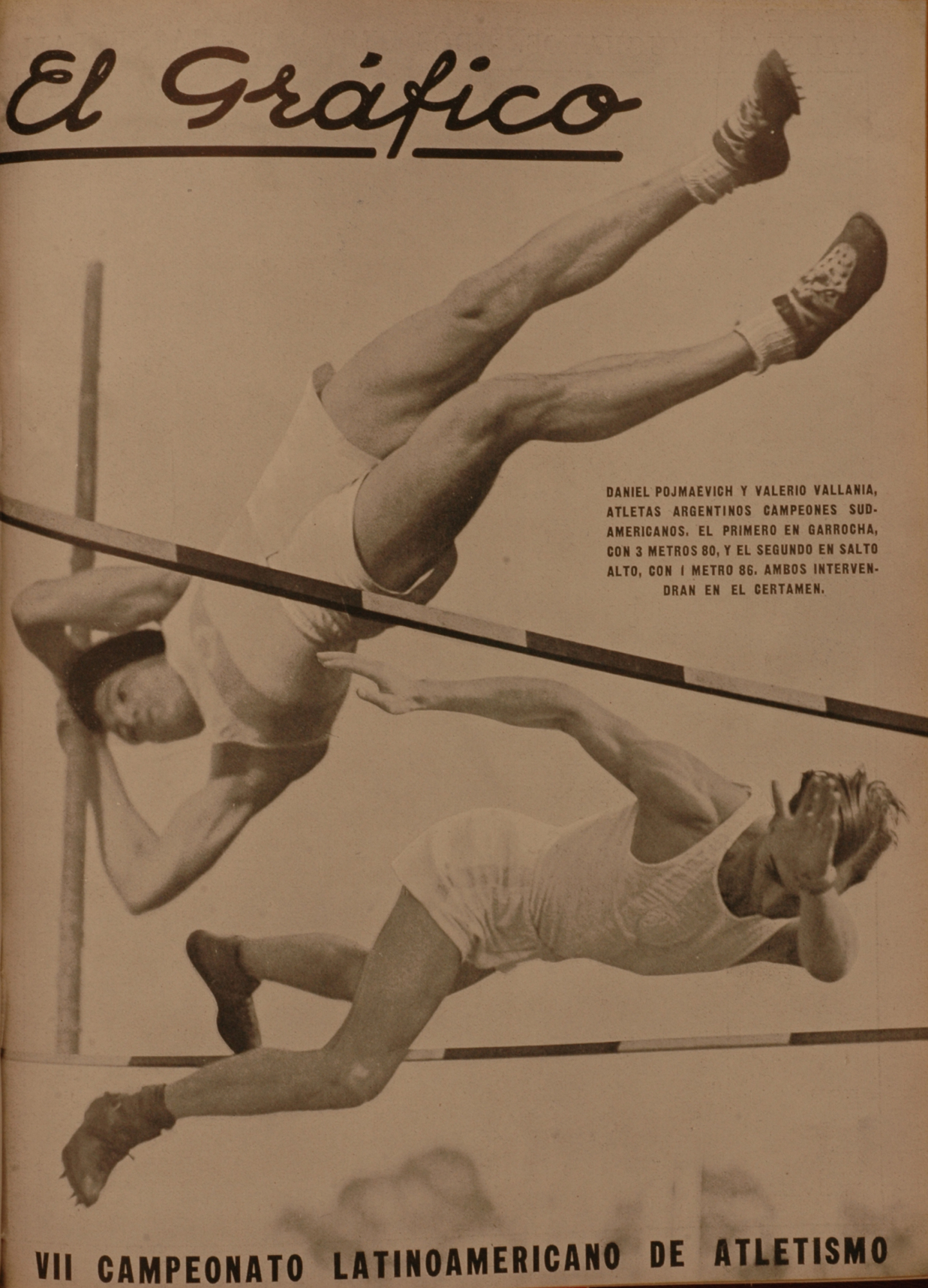
- Valerio Vallania in high jump.

Personal information
- Born: Valerio Ángel Vallania; 14 July 1906 Córdoba, Argentina
- Died: 8 October 1998 (aged 92) Córdoba, Argentina

Sport
- Sport: Track and field
- Events: 110 metres hurdles, high jump

Valerio Ángel Vallania (14 July 1906 – 8 October 1998) was an Argentine hurdler and high jumper. He competed in the men's 110 metres hurdles at the 1928 Summer Olympics. He achieved his personal best in high jump at 1.91 metres on 26 March 1932. That was new South American record.
