= Leopoldo Tahier =

Argentine swimmer

Personal information
- Born: 17 June 1911 Buenos Aires, Argentina

Sport
- Sport: Swimming

Leopoldo Tahier (born 17 June 1911, date of death unknown) was an Argentine freestyle swimmer. He competed in two events at the 1932 Summer Olympics.
