= Juan Conrads =

Chilean shot putter

Juan Conrads was a Chilean shot put champion in the 1930s.

He represented Chile in the 1931 South American Championships in Athletics.

Later he became a businessman and started Inchalam, Chile's major steel wire and nail producer, together with Victor and Jorge Matetic.
