= List of Argentine sports governing bodies =

Here is the list of Argentine sports federations :

- Bridge: Argentine Bridge Association (Asociación del Bridge Argentino)
- Scrabble: Argentine Scrabble Association (Asociación Argentina de Scrabble)
- Chess: Argentine Chess Federation (Federación Argentina de Ajedrez)
- Handball: Argentine Handball Confederation (Confederación Argentina de Handball)
- Football: Argentine Football Association (Asociación del Futbol Argentino)
- Fencing: Argentine Fencing Federation (Federación Argentina de Esgrima)
- Judo: Argentine Judo Confederation (Confederación Argentina de Judo)
- Athletics: Argentine Athletics Confederation (Confederación Argentina de Atletismo)
- Boxing: Argentine Boxing Federation (Federación Argentina de Boxeo)
