= Rodolfo Wagner =

Chilean sprinter

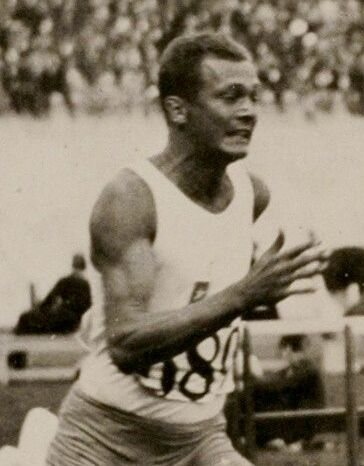

Personal information
- Nationality: Chilean
- Born: July 3, 1904 Coquimbo
- Died: March 1984 Santiago

Sport
- Sport: Sprinting
- Event: 100 metres

Rodolfo Wagner (1904–1984) was a Chilean sprinter. He competed in the men's 100 metres at the 1928 Summer Olympics.
