= Juan Bravo (athlete) =

Chilean long-distance runner

Juan Bravo was a Chilean athlete in the 1920s. He was a 10000 metres runner.

He won the silver medal in the 1924 South American Championships in Athletics, and the bronze medal in the 1926 South American Championships in Athletics and the 1929 South American Championships in Athletics. He also won the silver medal in the 1922 unofficial South American Championships.
