= Alfredo Rocca =

Argentine swimmer

Personal information
- Born: 5 May 1908 Buenos Aires, Argentina

Sport
- Sport: Swimming

Alfredo Rocca (born 5 May 1908, date of death unknown) was an Argentine freestyle swimmer. He competed in two events at the 1932 Summer Olympics.
