= Carlos Nelli =

Brazilian pole vaulter

Carlos Joel Nelli
Personal information
- Born: 3 December 1902 São Paulo, São Paulo, Brazil
- Died: 1 January 1994 (aged 91)

Sport
- Sport: Athletics
- Event: Pole vault

Carlos Nelli (3 December 1902 – 1 January 1994) was a Brazilian athlete. He competed in the men's pole vault at the 1932 Summer Olympics.
