= Francisco Dova =

Argentine sprinter

Personal information
- Nationality: Argentine
- Born: 1903

Sport
- Sport: Sprinting
- Event: 400 metres

Francisco Dova (born 1903, date of death unknown) was an Argentine sprinter. He competed in the men's 400 metres at the 1924 Summer Olympics.
