= Eduardo Albe =

Argentine athlete and Olympian

Personal information
- Born: 21 January 1900 Buenos Aires, Argentina
- Died: 9 November 1975 (aged 75) Buenos Aires, Argentina

Sport
- Sport: Sprinting
- Event: 100 metres

Eduardo Luis Albe (born 21 January 1900 – 9 November 1975) was an Argentine sprinter. He competed in the men's 100 metres at the 1928 Summer Olympics.

After retiring from his athletic career, Albe worked as a dentist in Buenos Aires to high-profile clients such as Juan and Eva Perón.
