= Alberto Barucco =

Argentine sprinter

Personal information
- Nationality: Argentine
- Born: 8 February 1906

Sport
- Sport: Sprinting
- Event: 100 metres

Alberto Barucco (born 8 February 1906, date of death unknown) was an Argentine sprinter. He competed in the men's 100 metres at the 1928 Summer Olympics.
