= Domingos Puglisi =

Brazilian sprinter

Personal information
- Nationality: Brazilian
- Born: 4 November 1911
- Died: 9 June 2004 (aged 92)

Sport
- Sport: Sprinting
- Event: 400 metres

Domingos Puglisi (4 November 1911 – 9 June 2004) was a Brazilian sprinter. He competed in the men's 400 metres at the 1932 Summer Olympics.
