= Enrique Thompson =

Argentine hurdler

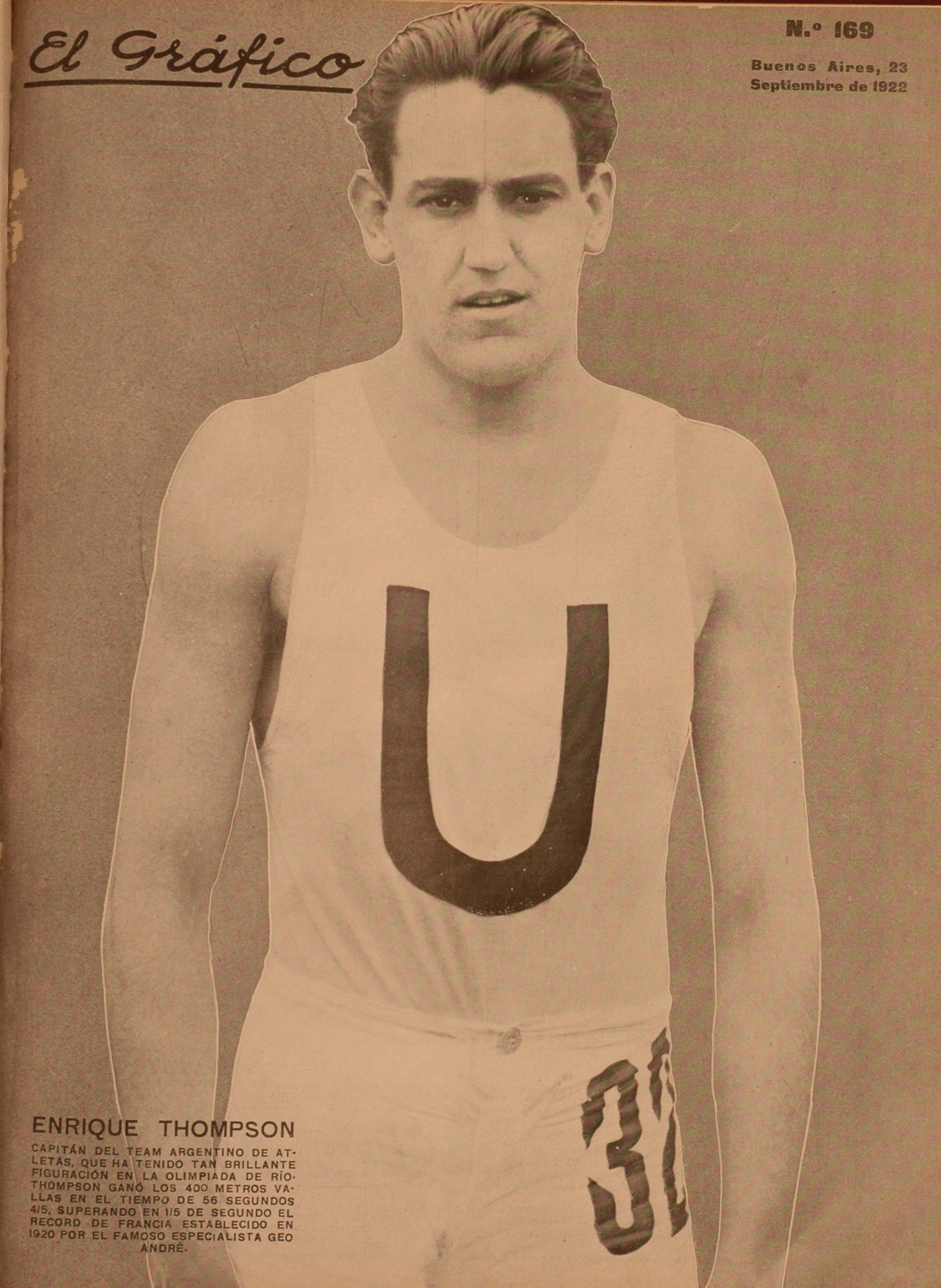
- Thompson on the cover of El Gráfico, 1922

Personal information
- Nationality: Argentine
- Born: 15 December 1897
- Died: 22 December 1928 (aged 31)

Sport
- Sport: Track and field
- Event: 400 metres hurdles

Enrique Thompson (15 December 1897 – 22 December 1928) was an Argentine hurdler. He competed in the men's 400 metres hurdles at the 1924 Summer Olympics.
