= Federico Brewster =

Argentine sprinter

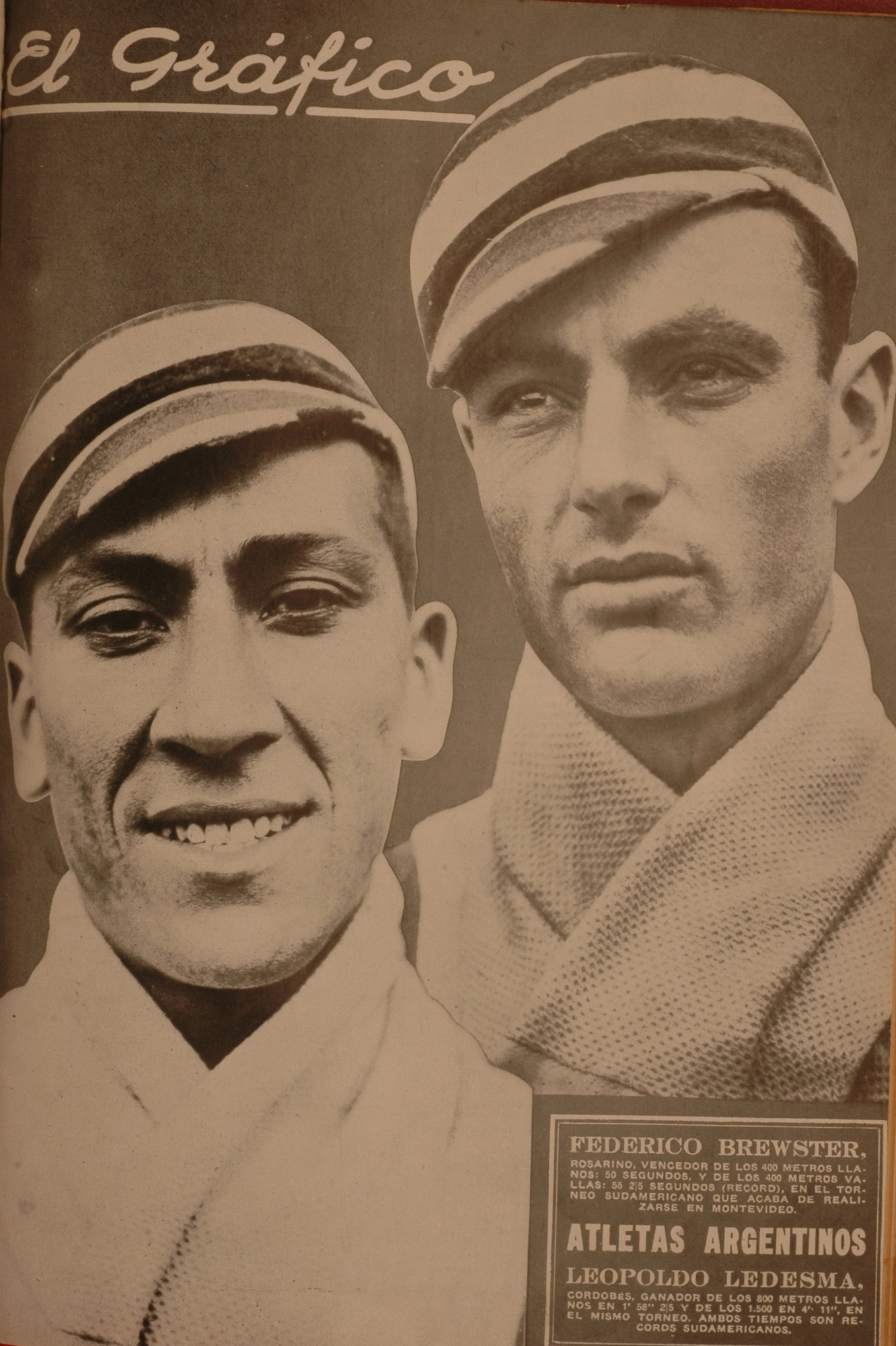
- Federico Brewster (left) and Leopoldo Ledesma - El Gráfico 355

Personal information
- Full name: Frederick William Brewster
- Nationality: Argentine
- Born: 21 January 1906 Islington, England

Sport
- Sport: Sprinting
- Event: 400 metres

Federico Brewster (born 21 January 1906, date of death unknown) was an English-born Argentine sprinter. He competed in the men's 400 metres at the 1924 Summer Olympics.
