= South American Championships in Athletics =

Biennial athletics event

The South American Championships in Athletics is a biennial athletics event organized by Atletismo Sudamericano. It is the first and oldest continental athletics competition. The first edition in 1919 was competed between only two countries (Chile and Uruguay), but it has since expanded and has generally been held every two years since 1927.

In addition, 8 unofficial championships were held between 1918 and 1957: the 1918 event was titled "Campeonato de Iniciación". The 1922 event was titled "Campeonato Latino-Americano". The 1931 event was held in celebration of the 100th anniversary of Uruguayan independence. The 1946 event was held in celebration of the 50th anniversary of the modern Olympic Games. The 1948 event was held in celebration of the 100th anniversary of the foundation of La Paz. The 1950 event was held in celebration of the 30th anniversary of the Uruguayan Athletics Federation. The 1957 event was for men only.

Countries are measured by a points system resulting from their respective athletes' performances. The country with the highest total points is declared the winner.

== Summary of Championships ==
Edition	Year	City	Country	Date	Venue	No. of Events	No. of Athletes	Top of the medal table
unofficial	1918	Buenos Aires	Argentina	24–26 May				Chile
1	1919	Montevideo	Uruguay	11–13 April				Chile
2	1920	Santiago	Chile	23–25 April				Chile
unofficial	1922	Rio de Janeiro	Brazil	September				Argentina
3	1924	Buenos Aires	Argentina	17–22 April				Argentina
4	1926	Montevideo	Uruguay	15–20 April				Argentina
5	1927	Santiago	Chile	14–19 April				Argentina
6	1929	Lima	Peru	5–10 May				Argentina
7	1931	Buenos Aires	Argentina	30 April – 5 May				Argentina
unofficial	1931	Montevideo	Uruguay	8–10 May				Argentina
8	1933	Montevideo	Uruguay	6–9 April				Argentina
9	1935	Santiago	Chile	11–14 April				Chile
10	1937	São Paulo	Brazil	27–30 May				Brazil
11	1939	Lima	Peru	25–28 May				Chile
12	1941	Buenos Aires	Argentina	26 April – 4 May				Argentina
13	1943	Santiago	Chile	23 April – 2 May				Chile
14	1945	Montevideo	Uruguay	15–22 April				Argentina
unofficial	1946	Santiago	Chile	April				Chile
15	1947	Rio de Janeiro	Brazil	25 April – 3 May				Argentina
unofficial	1948	La Paz	Bolivia	October				Peru
16	1949	Lima	Peru	16–24 April				Argentina
unofficial	1950	Montevideo	Uruguay					Uruguay
17	1952	Buenos Aires	Argentina	3–11 May				Argentina
unofficial	1953	Santiago	Chile	19–26 April	Estadio Nacional			Brazil
18	1954	São Paulo	Brazil	17–25 April				Brazil
19	1956	Santiago	Chile	14–22 April	Estadio Nacional			Argentina
unofficial	1957	Santiago	Chile	19-21 April	Estadio Nacional	22		Brazil
20	1958	Montevideo	Uruguay	19–27 April	Pista del Parque Batlle y Ordoñez	31		Brazil
unofficial	1959	São Paulo, Brazil	Brazil	22-24 May	Pacaembu Stadium	22		Brazil
21	1961	Lima	Peru	20–28 May	Estadio Nacional	31		Argentina
22	1963	Cali	Colombia	29 June – 7 July	Estadio Pascual Guerrero	31	175	Venezuela
23	1965	Rio de Janeiro	Brazil	8–16 May	Estádio Célio de Barros	31		Argentina
24	1967	Buenos Aires	Argentina	7–15 October	Pista de Atletismo Parque Chacabuco	32	250	Brazil
25	1969	Quito	Ecuador	4–12 October	Estadio Atahualpa	34	204	Brazil
26	1971	Lima	Peru	9–17 October	Estadio Nacional	34	208	Brazil
27	1974	Santiago	Chile	16–21 April	Estadio Nacional	37	229	Brazil
28	1975	Rio de Janeiro	Brazil	26–31 August	Estádio Célio de Barros	37	163	Brazil
29	1977	Montevideo	Uruguay	4–6 November	Pista del Parque Batlle y Ordoñez	37	253	Brazil
30	1979	Bucaramanga	Colombia	31 October – 4 November	Estadio Alfonso López Pumarejo	37	240	Brazil
31	1981	La Paz	Bolivia	5–8 November	Estadio Olímpico Hernando Siles	39	185	Brazil
32	1983	Santa Fé	Argentina	29 September – 2 October	Centro de Alto Rendimiento Deportivo Pedro Candioti	39	231	Brazil
33	1985	Santiago	Chile	12–15 September	Estadio Nacional	40	252	Brazil
34	1987	São Paulo	Brazil	8–11 October	Estádio Ícaro de Castro Melo	40	207	Brazil
35	1989	Medellín	Colombia	5–8 August	Estadio Alfonso Galvis Duque	41	223	Brazil
36	1991	Manaus	Brazil	28–30 June	Vila Olímpica de Manaus	41	257	Brazil
37	1993	Lima	Peru	2–4 July	Villa Deportiva Nacional	41	216	Brazil
38	1995	Manaus	Brazil	26–28 May	Vila Olímpica de Manaus	43	198	Brazil
39	1997	Mar del Plata	Argentina	4–6 April	Estadio Municipal Teodoro Bronzini	43	225	Brazil
40	1999	Bogotá	Colombia	25–27 June	El Salitre	43	260	Brazil
41	2001	Manaus	Brazil	18–20 May	Vila Olímpica de Manaus	44	217	Brazil
42	2003	Barquisimeto	Venezuela	20–22 June	Polideportivo Máximo Viloria	44	296	Brazil
43	2005	Cali	Colombia	21–24 July	Estadio Pascual Guerrero	44		Brazil
44	2006	Tunja	Colombia	29 September – 1 October	Estadio La Independencia	44	229	Brazil
45	2007	São Paulo	Brazil	7–9 June	Estádio Ícaro de Castro Melo	44		Brazil
46	2009	Lima	Peru	19–21 June	Villa Deportiva Nacional	44		Brazil
47	2011	Buenos Aires	Argentina	2–5 June	CeNARD	44	345	Brazil
48	2013	Cartagena	Colombia	5–7 July	Parque de Atletismo Campo Elías Gutiérrez	44	322	Brazil
49	2015	Lima	Peru	12–14 June	Villa Deportiva Nacional	44	333	Brazil
50	2017	Asunción	Paraguay	23–25 June	Pista Comité Olímpico Paraguayo	44	357	Brazil
51	2019	Lima	Peru	24–26 May	Villa Deportiva Nacional	44	325	Brazil
52	2021	Guayaquil	Ecuador	29–31 May	Estadio Modelo Alberto Spencer Herrera	45	377	Brazil
53	2023	São Paulo	Brazil	28–30 July	COTP Stadium	45	371	Brazil
54	2025	Mar del Plata	Argentina	25–27 April	Estadio Justo Ernesto Román	45	401	Brazil

== Medals (1919-2025) ==
Rank	Nation	Gold	Silver	Bronze	Total
1	Brazil	765	616	503	1,884
2	Argentina	376	373	392	1,141
3	Chile	298	328	378	1,004
4	Colombia	213	259	190	662
5	Venezuela	89	105	129	323
6	Uruguay	53	70	96	219
7	Peru	51	76	91	218
8	Ecuador	47	61	75	183
9	Panama	10	6	14	30
10	Paraguay	8	8	10	26
11	Bolivia	4	11	22	37
12	Guyana	2	3	6	11
13	Suriname	2	1	3	6
14	Netherlands Antilles	0	0	1	1
Totals (14 entries)		1,918	1,917	1,910	5,745

== Wins by country ==
Overall points winners
Country	No. wins
Brazil	35
Argentina	14
Chile	7
Venezuela	1

== See also ==
- List of South American Championships in Athletics records
