= Pedro Pérez (athlete) =

Cuban triple jumper (1952–2018)

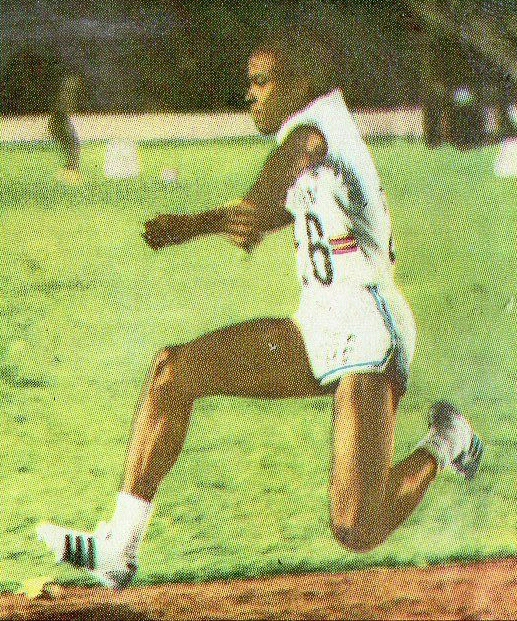
- Pedro Pérez in 1971

Personal information
- Born: 23 February 1952 Pinar del Río, Cuba
- Died: 18 July 2018 (aged 66) Havana, Cuba

Sport
- Sport: Track and field
Medal record
Representing Cuba
Pan American Games
Gold medal – first place	1971 Cali	Triple jump
Central American and Caribbean Games
Gold medal – first place	1970 Panama City	Triple jump
Gold medal – first place	1974 Santo Domingo	Triple jump

Pedro Damián Pérez Dueñas (Spanish pronunciation: [ˈpeðɾo ˈpeɾes]; February 23, 1952 – July 18, 2018) was a Cuban triple jumper, who set the world record in the men's triple jump event on August 5, 1971, jumping 17.40 metres, while still a 19-year-old Junior athlete, in the final of the Pan American Games. His mark was a centimeter improvement over the three-year-old record of Viktor Sanyeyev set as the last of 5 world record improvements during the 1968 Olympics emphasizing the advantage of jumping at altitude. Cali, Colombia, is also considered at altitude. While Sanyeyev reclaimed the record at sea level in Sukhumi, the next record in succession by João Carlos de Oliveira was also set at altitude in Mexico City and lasted ten more years. While he was the standing world record holder during the 1972 Olympics, he only managed a 15.72 and did not get out of the qualifying round. He improved four years later, taking the early lead in the final before eventually finishing in fourth place.

Pérez was born in Pinar del Río, Cuba. He died on July 18, 2018, at the age of 66.

== International competitions ==
Year	Competition	Venue	Position	Event	Notes
Representing Cuba
1970	Central American and Caribbean Games	Panama City, Panama	1st	Triple jump	16.33 m
1971	Central American and Caribbean Championships	Kingston, Jamaica	1st	Triple jump	15.94 m
1971	Pan American Games	Cali, Colombia	1st	Triple jump	17.40 m
1972	Olympic Games	Munich, West Germany	24th (q)	Triple jump	15.72 m
1974	Central American and Caribbean Games	Santo Domingo, Dominican Republic	1st	Triple jump	17.01 m
1976	Olympic Games	Montreal, Canada	4th	Triple jump	16.81 m

Records
Preceded by (Soviet Union) Viktor Sanyeyev	Men's Triple Jump World Record Holder; 1971-08-05 — 1972-10-17	Succeeded by (Soviet Union) Viktor Sanyeyev
