= Adolfo Schlegel =

Chilean pole vaulter

Personal information
- Nationality: Chilean
- Born: 2 August 1900

Sport
- Sport: Athletics
- Event: Pole vault

Adolfo Schlegel (born 2 August 1900, date of death unknown) was a Chilean athlete. He competed in the men's pole vault at the 1936 Summer Olympics.
