= Juan Carlos Zabala =

Argentine runner (1911–1983)

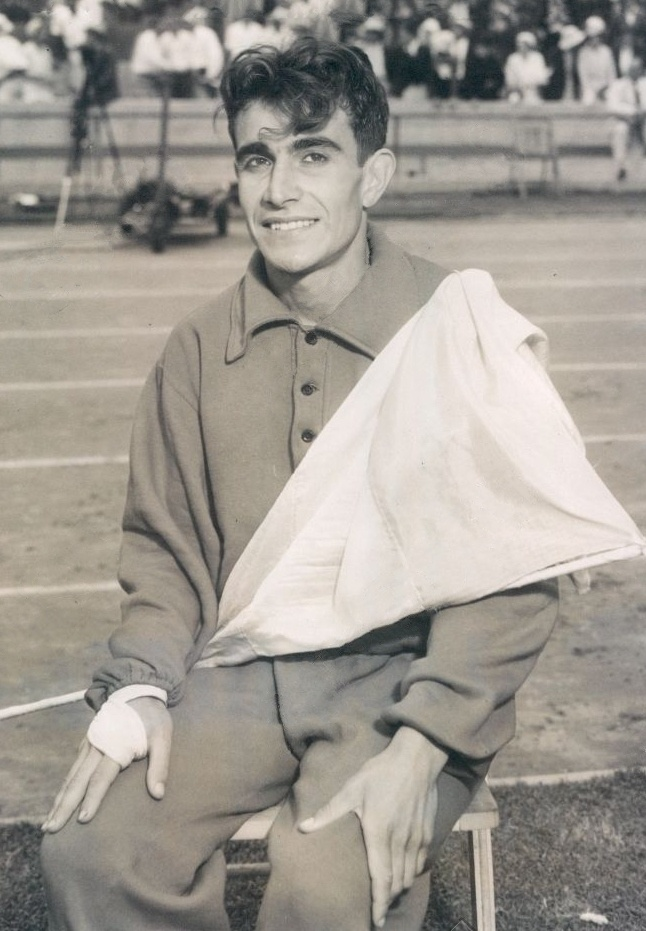
- Zabala in 1932

Personal information
- Born: October 11, 1911 Rosario, Santa Fe, Argentina
- Died: January 24, 1983 (aged 71) Buenos Aires, Argentina
- Height: 165 cm (5 ft 5 in)
- Weight: 55 kg (121 lb)

Sport
- Sport: Athletics
- Events: 5000 m, 10000 m, marathon

Achievements and titles
- Personal bests: 5000 m – 14.55.8 (1932); 10000 m – 30:56.2 (1936); Mar – 2:31:36 (1932)
Medal record
Representing Argentina
Olympic Games
Gold medal – first place	1932 Los Angeles	Marathon

Juan Carlos Zabala (October 11, 1911 – January 24, 1983), also known as "El Ñandú Criollo", was an Argentine long-distance runner, who won the marathon at the 1932 Summer Olympics.

== Biography ==
Zabala ran his first marathon at the end of October 1931. Ten days after that he set a new world record in the 30 km (1:42:30.4). Later, before the 1936 Summer Olympics, Zabala would run a new world record in the 20 km (1:04:00.2).

Zabala's peak was the 1932 Olympic marathon race. He ran in the lead group almost the entire distance. With just four kilometres left, he broke free to finish 20 seconds ahead of Sam Ferris from Great Britain. Zabala also participated at the 1936 Summer Olympics, placing sixth over 10,000 m, but could not defend his Olympic title in the marathon. Zabala took the lead from the start, but tripped and fell at 28 km, and abandoned the race after 33 km when the main group caught him.

Zabala was the flag bearer for Argentina at the opening ceremony of the 1936 Summer Olympics. In 1983 he was named as Argentina's track and field athlete of the century.
