= Juan Acosta (athlete) =

Chilean long-distance runner 1907–1994

Juan Acosta Umazabal
Personal information
- Born: 16 April 1907 Santiago, Chile
- Died: 20 September 1994 (aged 87) Santiago, Chile

Sport
- Sport: Long-distance running
- Event: Marathon

Juan Acosta Umazabal (16 April 1907 – 20 September 1994) was a Chilean long-distance runner. He competed in the marathon at the 1936 Summer Olympics.
