= Juan Bautista Pina =

Argentine sprinter

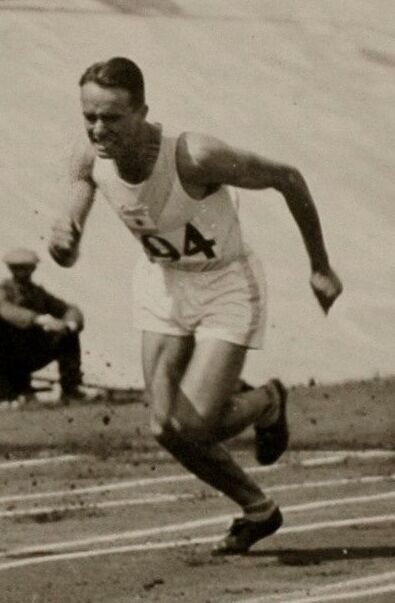
- Juan Bautista Pina in 1928

Personal information
- Nationality: Argentine
- Born: 19 July 1907

Sport
- Sport: Sprinting
- Event: 100 metres

Juan Bautista Pina (born 19 July 1907, date of death unknown) was an Argentine sprinter. He competed in the men's 100 metres at the 1928 Summer Olympics.
