= Ricardo Bayer =

Chilean hammer thrower (1903–1970)

Personal information
- Full name: Ricardo Guillermo Bayer Siegle
- Born: 11 November 1903 Valdivia, Chile
- Died: 28 May 1970 (aged 66) Rengo, Chile

Sport
- Sport: Athletics
- Event: Hammer throw

Ricardo Bayer (11 November 1903 – 28 May 1970) was a Chilean athlete. He competed in the men's hammer throw at the 1928 Summer Olympics.
