= Félix Escobar =

Argentine sprinter

Personal information
- Nationality: Argentine
- Born: 1901 La Plata, Argentina
- Died: 9 November 1934 La Plata, Argentina

Sport
- Sport: Track and field
- Events: 100m, 200m, 400m

Félix A. Escobar (1901 - 9 November 1934) was an Argentine track and field athlete. Escobar competed in the men's 110 metres, the men's 400 metres, the men's 100 metres, and the men's 4 x 100 metres relay at the 1924 Summer Olympics.
