= José de Almeida =

Brazilian sprinter (1904–1988)

Personal information
- Full name: José Xavier de Almeida
- Born: 4 October 1904 Rio de Janeiro, Brazil
- Died: 20 February 1988 (aged 83) Rio de Janeiro, Brazil

Sport
- Sport: Sprinting
- Event: 100 metres

José de Almeida (4 October 1904 – 20 February 1988) was a Brazilian sprinter. He competed in the 100 metres at the 1932 Summer Olympics and the 1936 Summer Olympics.
