= Leopoldo Ledesma =

Argentine middle-distance runner

Personal information
- Nationality: Argentine
- Born: 20 July 1903

Sport
- Sport: Middle-distance running
- Event: 800 metres

Leopoldo Ledesma (born 20 July 1903, date of death unknown) was an Argentine middle-distance runner. He competed in the men's 800 metres at the 1928 Summer Olympics.
