= Alfredo Ugarte =

Chilean hurdler

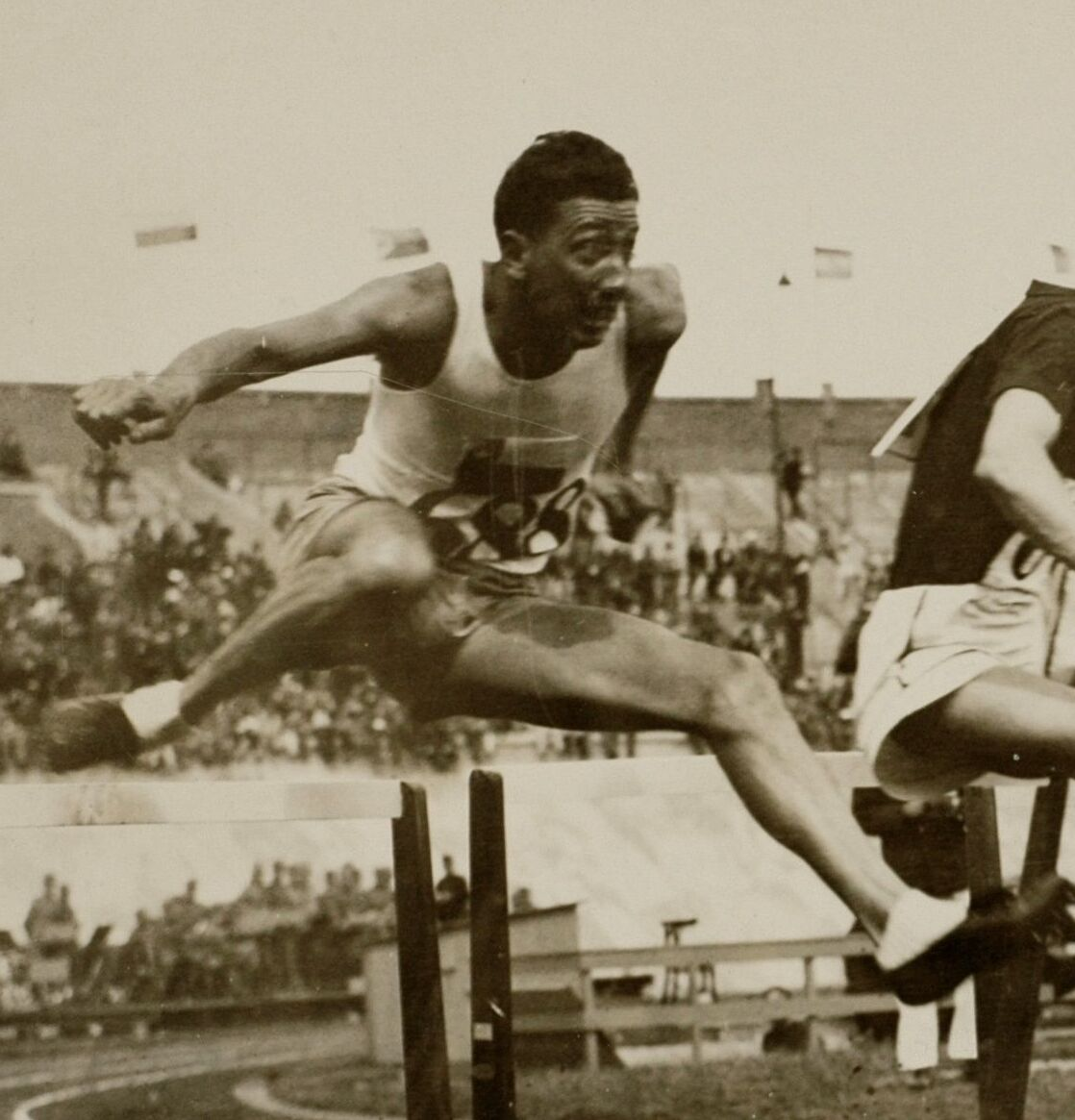
- Alfredo Ugarte in 1928

Personal information
- Nationality: Chilean
- Born: 1903

Sport
- Sport: Track and field
- Event: 110 metres hurdles

Alfredo Ugarte (born 1903, date of death unknown) was a Chilean hurdler. He competed in the 110 metres hurdles at the 1924 Summer Olympics and the 1928 Summer Olympics.
