= Pedro Elsa =

Argentine athlete

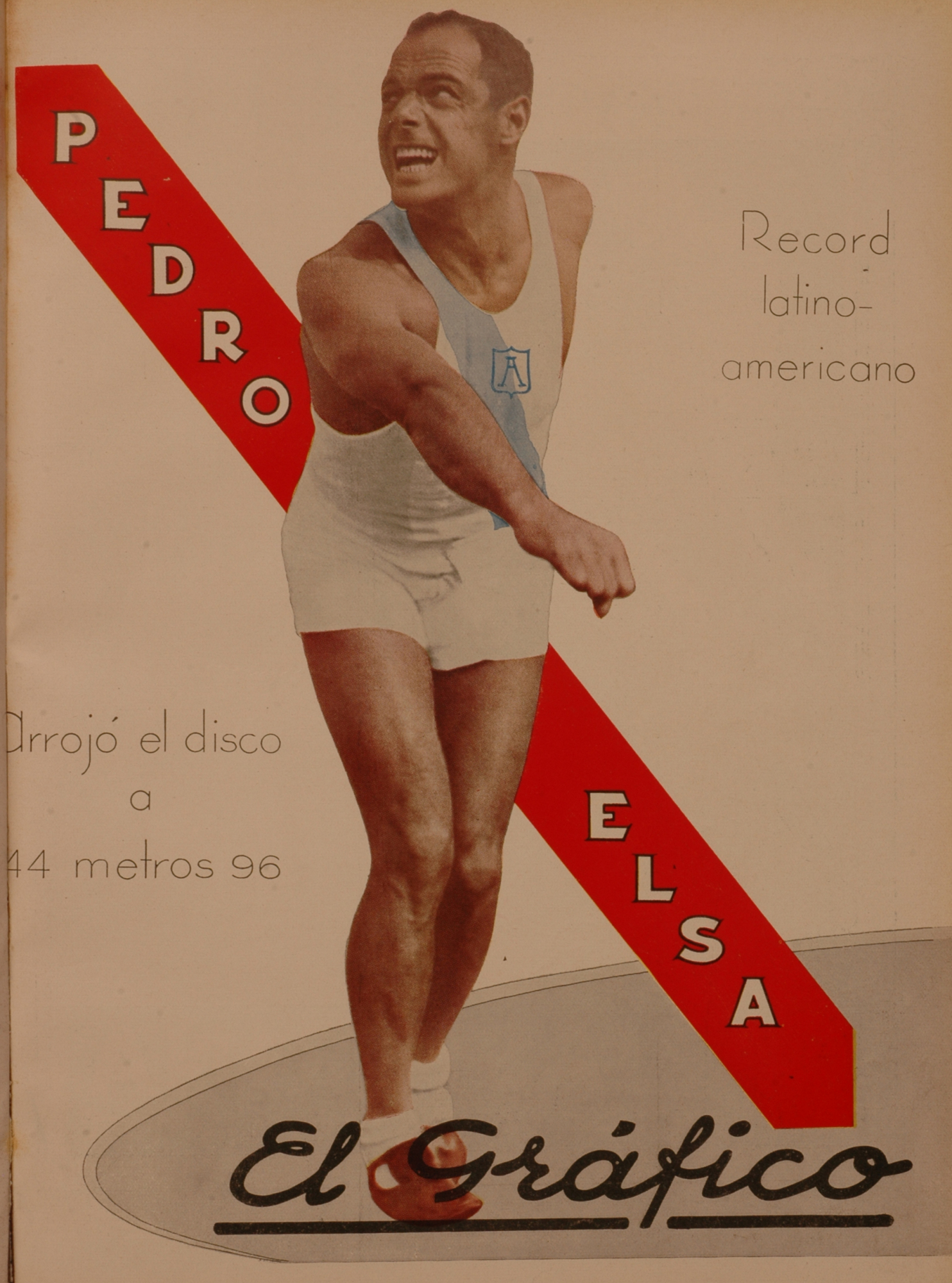
- Pedro Elsa in 1932

Personal information
- Born: 28 October 1901 Buenos Aires, Argentina

Sport
- Sport: Athletics
- Events: Shot put Discus

Pedro Elsa (born 28 October 1901, date of death unknown) was an Argentine athlete. He competed in the men's shot put and the men's discus throw at the 1932 Summer Olympics.
