= Roberto Genta =

Argentine sprinter

Personal information
- Nationality: Argentine
- Born: 1 March 1907
- Died: 11 July 1985 (aged 78)

Sport
- Sport: Sprinting
- Event: 200 metres

Roberto Genta (1 March 1907 – 11 July 1985) was an Argentine sprinter. He competed in the men's 200 metres at the 1932 Summer Olympics.
