= Manuel Plaza =

Chilean long-distance runner

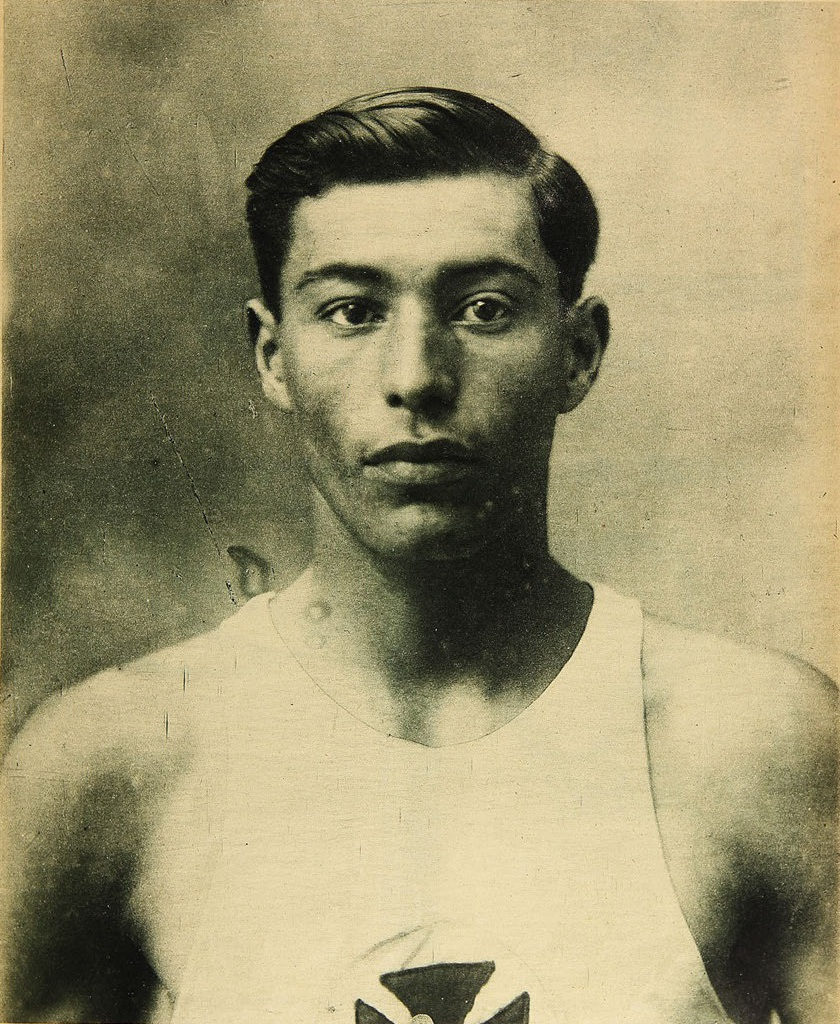
- Manuel Plaza in 1924

Personal information
- Born: 17 March 1900 San Bernardo, Chile
- Died: 9 February 1969 (aged 68) Santiago, Chile
- Height: 171 cm (5 ft 7 in)
- Weight: 61 kg (134 lb)

Sport
- Sport: Athletics
- Event: 5000 m – marathon

Achievements and titles
- Personal bests: 5000 m – 15:12.4 (1926); 10,000 m – 31:54.0 (1926); Marathon – 2:33:23 (1928)
Medal record
Representing Chile
Silver medal – second place	1928 Amsterdam	Marathon

Manuel Jesús Plaza Reyes (17 March 1900 – 9 February 1969) was a Chilean athlete who won the country's first Olympic medal. He earned a silver medal in the marathon at the 1928 Amsterdam Olympic Games, finishing with a time of 2 hours, 33 minutes, and 23 seconds, just 26 seconds behind French runner Boughéra El Ouafi. In the 1924 Paris Olympics, Plaza placed sixth.

== Early life and education ==
Plaza was born in Lampa, Chile, to Camilo Plaza and María Reyes. His family later moved to Santiago, where he attended elementary school at Desiderio Araneda on San Alfonso Street. After learning basic reading, writing, and math, he worked as a newsboy, which he credited with helping him develop his athletic abilities while pursuing his sporting career.

== Athletic career ==
Plaza was inspired by runners such as Martiniano Becerra, Benjamín Flores, and Juan Jorquera, which led him to pursue athletics. He began training alone in the ellipse of Parque Cousiño, now Parque O'Higgins, and joined training sessions with established athlete Alfonso Sánchez, who encouraged him to compete.

His first race, at age 16, was a lap around Parque Cousiño, which he won. As a federated athlete, Plaza was a member of the Centenario Athletic Club, Pietro Dorando, and joined Green Cross in 1922.

During the 1920s, Plaza excelled in long-distance events in South America. Besides his silver medal in the 1928 Amsterdam Olympics, he placed sixth in the marathon at the 1924 Paris Olympics. At the 1923 South American Championship, he finished third in the 5,000 meters and second in the 10,000 meters. He went on to win four gold medals in each of the next three editions of the championships (1924, 1926, and 1927) in the 5,000 meters, 10,000 meters, cross-country, and 3,000 meters team events. Plaza also won the cross-country and 32 km races in 1933.

He was Chile's flag bearer at the opening ceremonies of the 1924 Paris and 1928 Amsterdam Olympic Games.

A myth circulated that Plaza finished second in the Amsterdam marathon after getting lost shortly before reaching the finish line, a version he himself promoted.
