= Héctor Benaprés =

Chilean athlete (1902–?)

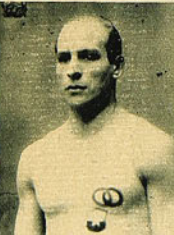

Personal information
- Full name: Héctor Eduardo Nolasco Benaprés Lafourcade
- Born: 31 January 1902 Santiago, Chile

Sport
- Sport: Athletics
- Event: Discus throw

Héctor Benaprés (born 31 January 1902, date of death unknown) was a Chilean athlete. He competed in the men's discus throw at the 1928 Summer Olympics.
