= Hermenegildo del Rosso =

Argentine middle-distance runner

Personal information
- Nationality: Argentine
- Born: 31 May 1908 Aosta, Kingdom of Italy
- Died: 30 May 1981 (aged 72)

Sport
- Sport: Middle-distance running
- Event: 800 metres

Hermenegildo del Rosso (31 May 1908 – 30 May 1981) was an Argentine middle-distance runner. He competed in the men's 800 metres at the 1932 Summer Olympics.
