= José Vicente Salinas =

Chilean sprinter

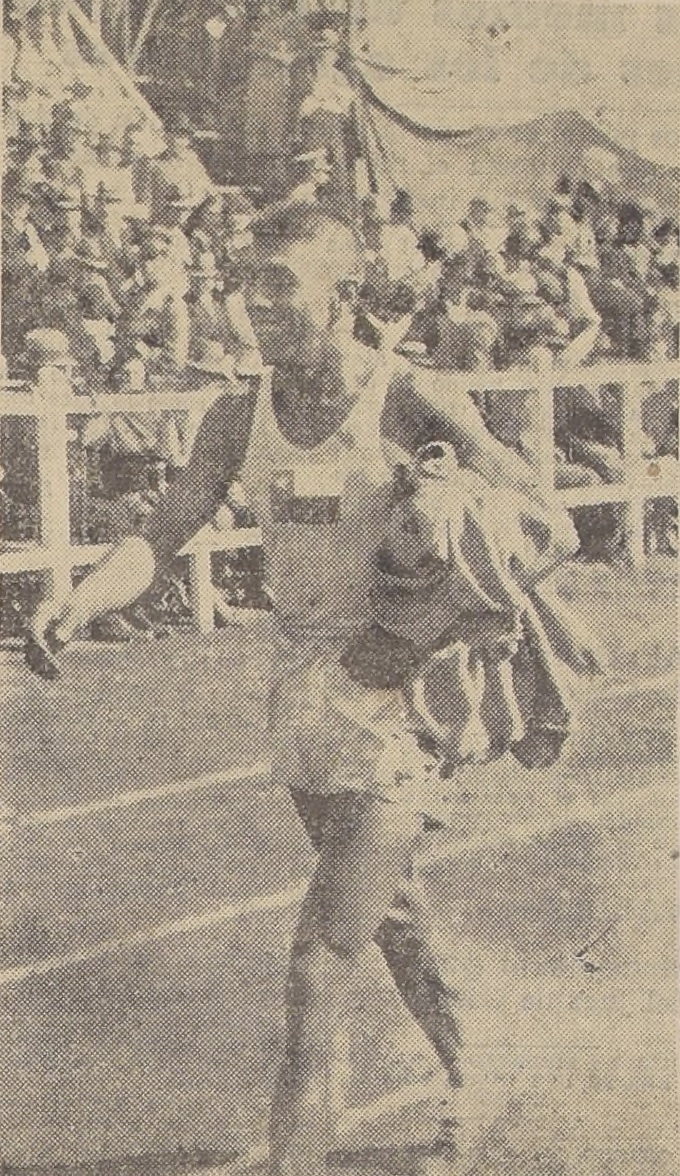

Personal information
- Nationality: Chilean
- Born: 5 April 1904
- Died: 13 February 1975 (aged 70)

Sport
- Sport: Sprinting
- Event: 400 metres

José Vicente Salinas (5 April 1904 – 13 February 1975) was a Chilean sprinter. He competed in the men's 400 metres at the 1928 Summer Olympics.
