= Luis Brunetto =

Argentine triple jumper

Olympic medal record

Men's athletics

Representing Argentina
Silver medal – second place	1924 Paris	Triple jump

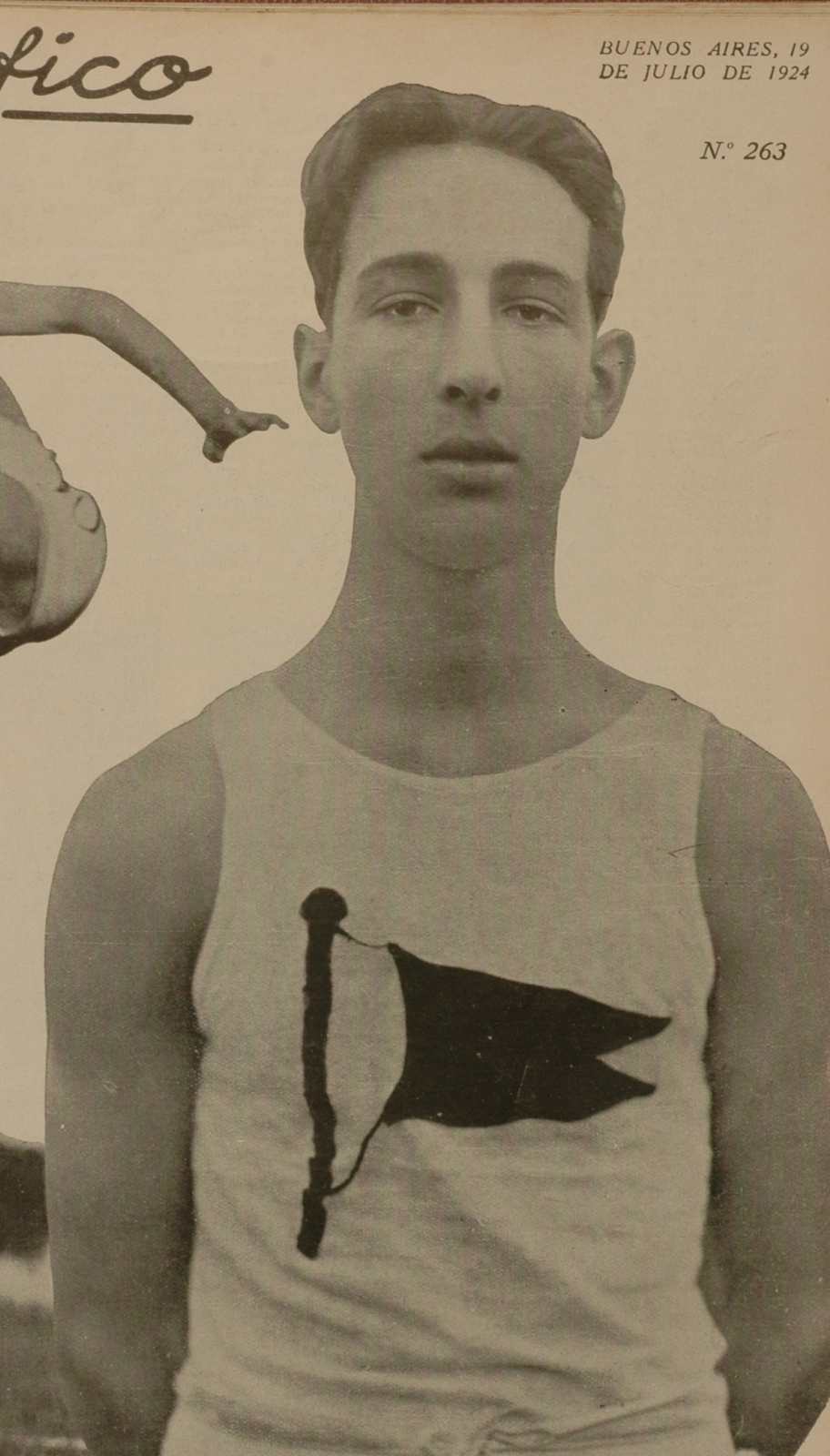
Brunetto in El Gráfico, 1924

Luis Antonio Brunetto (October 27, 1901 – May 7, 1968) was an Argentine athlete who competed mainly in the triple jump. He competed for Argentina in the 1924 Summer Olympics held in Paris, France, in the triple jump where he won the silver medal.

Brunetto was born in Rosario and died in Llavallol. His parents were Italian and returned to their native country when he was three years old.
