= José Ribas =

Argentine long-distance runner

Personal information
- Nationality: Argentine
- Born: 1 October 1899 São Paulo, Brazil

Sport
- Sport: Long-distance running
- Event: Marathon

José Ribas (born 1 October 1899, date of death unknown) was an Argentine long-distance runner. He competed in the marathon at the 1932 Summer Olympics.
