= Federico Kleger =

Argentine hammer thrower

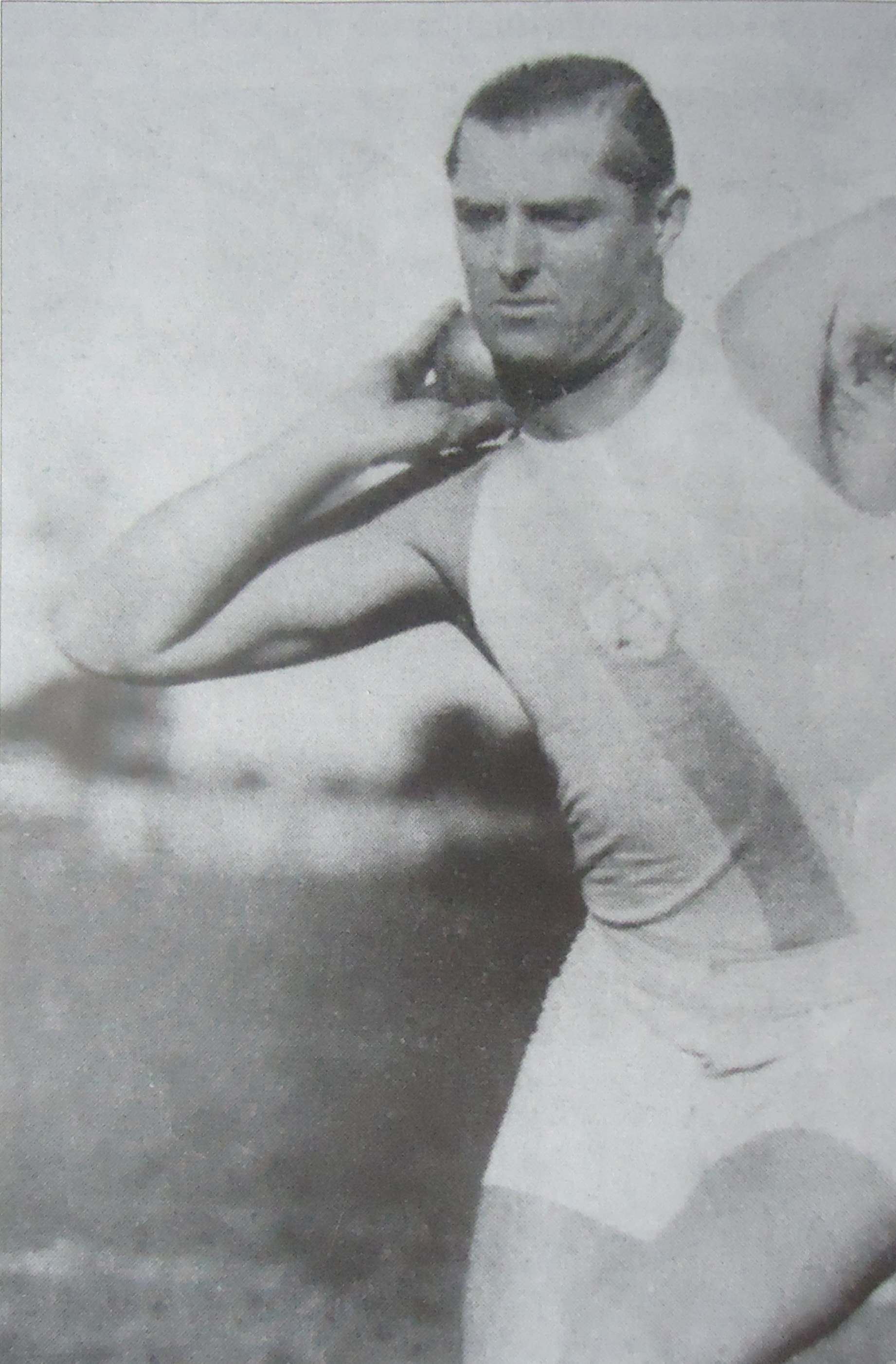
- Federico Kleger in 1931

Personal information
- Nationality: Argentine
- Born: 9 January 1903 Wynberg, Cape Colony (present day South Africa)
- Died: 5 January 1952 (aged 48)

Sport
- Sport: Athletics
- Event: Hammer throw

Federico Kleger (9 January 1903 – 5 January 1952) was an Argentine athlete. He competed in the men's hammer throw at the 1928 Summer Olympics and the 1932 Summer Olympics.
