= Boxing at the 1932 Summer Olympics – Light heavyweight =

Boxing competitions

The men's light heavyweight event was part of the boxing programme at the 1932 Summer Olympics. The weight class was the second-heaviest contested, and allowed boxers of up to 175 pounds (79.4 kilograms). The competition was held from Wednesday, August 10, 1932, to Saturday, August 13, 1932. Eight boxers from eight nations competed.

== Medalists ==
Gold	Silver	Bronze
David Carstens; South Africa	Gino Rossi; Italy	Peter Jørgensen; Denmark

== Results ==
Quarterfinals; August 10
Gino Rossi (ITA)	PTS
Nikolaos Mastoridis (GRE)	L
Jim Murphy (IRL)	PTS
Johnny Miler (USA)	L
Peter Jørgensen (DEN)	PTS
Rafael Lang (ARG)	L
David Carstens (RSA)	PTS
Hans Berger (GER)	L

Semifinals; August 11
Rossi (ITA)	wo
Murphy (IRL)	-
Jørgensen (DEN)	L
Carstens (RSA)	PTS

Final; August 13
Rossi (ITA)	L
Carstens (RSA)	PTS
Third place
Jørgensen (DEN)	wo
Murphy (IRL)	-
