= Ireland at the 1932 Summer Olympics =

- IOC code: IRL
- NOC: Olympic Federation of Ireland
- Website: olympics.ie

in Los Angeles
- Flag bearer: Pat O'Callaghan
- Medals Ranked 16th: Gold 2 Silver 0 Bronze 0 Total 2

Summer Olympics appearances (overview)
- 1924; 1928; 1932; 1936; 1948; 1952; 1956; 1960; 1964; 1968; 1972; 1976; 1980; 1984; 1988; 1992; 1996; 2000; 2004; 2008; 2012; 2016; 2020; 2024

Other related appearances
- Great Britain (1896–1920)

Ireland competed at the 1932 Summer Olympics in Los Angeles, United States.

== Medalists ==
Medal	Name	Sport	Event
Gold	Pat O'Callaghan	Athletics	Men's Hammer throw
Gold	Bob Tisdall	Athletics	Men's 400 m Hurdles

== Athletics ==
Athlete	Event	Round 1		Semifinal		Final	
Athlete	Event	Time	Rank	Time	Rank	Time	Rank
Bob Tisdall	Men's 400m Hurdles	54.8	1	52.8 =OR	1	51.8	1st place, gold medalist(s)
Sonny Murphy	Men's 3000m Steeplechase	DNF		–		Did Not Advance	

=== Field ===
Athlete	Event	Final	
Athlete	Event	Mark	Rank
Eamonn Fitzgerald	Men's Triple Jump	15.01	4
Pat O'Callaghan	Men's Hammer Throw	53.92	1st place, gold medalist(s)
Bob Tisdall	Men's Decathlon	6398	8

== Boxing ==
=== Men's Bantamweight (54kg) ===
Patrick Hughes

- First Round Lost to Carlos Pereyra (ARG), Points

=== Men's Featherweight (57.2kg) ===
Ernest Smith

- Quarterfinals Lost to Carmelo Robledo (ARG), Points

=== Men's Welterweight (66.7kg) ===
Larry Flood

- First Round Lost to Dick Barton (RSA), Points

=== Men's Light Heavyweight (79.4kg) ===
Jim Murphy

- First Round Win against Johnny Miler (USA), Points
- Semifinals Lost to Gino Rossi (ITA), W/O

== Sources ==
- Official Olympic Reports
- International Olympic Committee results database
