= Boxing at the 1932 Summer Olympics – Featherweight =

Boxing competitions

The men's featherweight event was part of the boxing programme at the 1932 Summer Olympics. The weight class was the third-lightest contested, and allowed boxers of up to 126 pounds (57.2 kilograms). The competition was held from Tuesday, August 9, 1932 to Saturday, August 13, 1932. Ten boxers from ten nations competed.

== Medalists ==
Gold	Silver	Bronze
Carmelo Robledo; Argentina	Josef Schleinkofer; Germany	Allan Carlsson; Sweden

== Results ==
Round of 16; August 9
Josef Schleinkofer (GER)	-
Bye	-
John Keller (CAN)	-
Bye	-
Gaspare Alessandri (ITA)	-
Bye	-
Henri Walter (FRA)	-
Bye	-
Carmelo Robledo (ARG)	-
Bye	-
Ernest Smith (IRL)	-
Bye	-
Allan Carlsson (SWE)	PTS
Katsuo Kameoka (JPN)	L
John Hines (USA)	PTS
Miguel Araico (MEX)	L

Quarterfinals; August 10
Schleinkofer (GER)	PTS
Keller (CAN)	L
Alessandri (ITA)	PTS
Walter (FRA)	L
Robledo (ARG)	PTS
Smith (IRL)	L
Carlsson (SWE)	PTS
Hines (USA)	L

Semifinals; August 11
Schleinkofer (GER)	PTS
Alessandri (ITA)	L
Robledo (ARG)	PTS
Carlsson (SWE)	L

Final; August 13
Schleinkofer (GER)	L
Robledo (ARG)	PTS
Bronze medal bout
Carlsson (SWE)	PTS
Alessandri (ITA)	L
