= Boxing at the 1932 Summer Olympics – Welterweight =

Boxing competitions

The men's welterweight event was part of the boxing programme at the 1932 Summer Olympics. The weight class was the fourth-heaviest contested, and allowed boxers of up to 147 pounds (66.7 kilograms). The competition was held from Tuesday, August 9, 1932 to Saturday, August 13, 1932. Sixteen boxers from 16 nations competed.

== Medalists ==
Gold	Silver	Bronze
Edward Flynn; United States	Erich Campe; Germany	Bruno Ahlberg; Finland

== Results ==
Round of 16; August 9
Edward Flynn (USA)	PTS
Luis Sardella (ARG)	L
Dick Barton (RSA)	PTS
Larry Flood (IRL)	L
Lucien Laplace (FRA)	PTS
Carlos Padilla (PHI)	L
Dave McCleave (GBR)	W
Al Romero (MEX)	DIS
Erich Campe (GER)	PTS
Aikoku Hirabayashi (JPN)	L
Carl Jensen (DEN)	PTS
Nils Althin (SWE)	L
Luciano Fabbroni (ITA)	PTS
Harold Thomas (NZL)	L
Bruno Ahlberg (FIN)	PTS
Tony Mancini (CAN)	L

Quarterfinals; August 11
Flynn (USA)	PTS
Barton (RSA)	L
Laplace (FRA)	L
McCleave (GBR)	PTS
Campe (GER)	PTS
Jensen (DEN)	L
Fabbroni (ITA)	L
Ahlberg (FIN)	PTS

Semifinals; August 12
Flynn (USA)	PTS
McCleave (GBR)	L
Campe (GER)	PTS
Ahlberg (FIN)	L

Final; August 13
Flynn (USA)	PTS
Campe (GER)	L
Bronze medal bout
Ahlberg (FIN)	wo
McCleave (GBR)	-
