= Boxing at the 1932 Summer Olympics – Middleweight =

Boxing competitions

The men's middleweight event was part of the boxing programme at the 1932 Summer Olympics. The weight class was the third-heaviest contested, and allowed boxers of up to 160 pounds (72.6 kilograms). The competition was held from Tuesday, August 9, 1932 to Saturday, August 13, 1932. Ten boxers from ten nations competed.

== Medalists ==
Gold	Silver	Bronze
Carmen Barth; United States	Amado Azar; Argentina	Ernest Peirce; South Africa

== Results ==
Round of 16; August 9
Carmen Barth (USA)	—
bye	—
Manuel Cruz (MEX)	—
bye	—
Ernest Peirce (RSA)	—
bye	—
Lajos Szigeti (HUN)	—
bye	—
Amado Azar (ARG)	—
bye	—
Aldo Longinotti (ITA)	—
bye	—
Roger Michelot (FRA)	PTS
Louis Lavoie (CAN)	L
Hans Bernlöhr (GER)	PTS
Bert Lowe (NZL)	L

Quarterfinals; August 10
Barth (USA)	W
Cruz (MEX)	KO2
Peirce (RSA)	PTS
Szigeti (HUN)	L
Azar (ARG)	PTS
Longinotti (ITA)	L
Michelot (FRA)	PTS
Bernlöhr (GER)	L

Semifinals; August 11
Barth (USA)	PTS
Peirce (RSA)	L
Azar (ARG)	PTS
Michelot (FRA)	L

Final; August 13
Barth (USA)	PTS
Azar (ARG)	L
Bronze medal bout
Peirce (RSA)	wo
Michelot (FRA)	-
