= Boxing at the 1936 Summer Olympics – Light heavyweight =

Boxing competitions

The men's light heavyweight event was part of the boxing programme at the 1936 Summer Olympics. The weight class was the second-heaviest contested, and allowed boxers of up to 175 pounds (79.4 kilograms). The competition was held from Monday, August 10, 1936, to Saturday, August 15, 1936. Twenty-one boxers from 21 nations competed.

== Medalists ==
| Gold | Silver | Bronze |
|---|---|---|
| Roger Michelot; France | Richard Vogt; Germany | Francisco Risiglione; Argentina |

== Results ==
Round of 32; August 10
Francisco Risiglione (ARG) | —
Bye | —
Jean-Pierre Graser (LUX) | —
Bye | —
Thomas Griffin (GBR) | —
Bye | —
Antonio Adipe (URU) | —
Bye | —
Hannes Koivunen (FIN) | —
Bye | —
Oliver Shanks (CAN) | —
Bye | —
Richard Vogt (GER) | —
Bye | —
Erminio Bolzan (ITA) | —
Bye | —
Roger Michelot (FRA) | —
Bye | —
Børge Holm (DEN) | PTS
Paul Schweifer (AUT) | L
Wim Fock (NED) | PTS
Wang Yunlan (ROC) | L
Leslie Harley (AUS) | PTS
Walter van Bueren (SUI) | L
František Havelka (TCH) | PTS
Pol Goffaux (BEL) | L
Robey Leibbrandt (RSA) | PTS
Jarl Johnsen (NOR) | L
Mohammed Amin (EGY) | PTS
Carl Vinciquerra (USA) | L

Round of 16; August 11
Risiglione (ARG) | PTS
Graser (LUX) | L
Griffin (GBR) | PTS
Adipe (URU) | L
Koivunen (FIN) | PTS
Shanks (CAN) | L
Vogt (GER) | PTS
Bolzan (ITA) | L
Michelot (FRA) | —
Bye | —
Holm (DEN) | PTS
Fock (NED) | L
Harley (AUS) | L
Havelka (TCH) | PTS
Leibbrandt (RSA) | PTS
Amin (EGY) | L

Quarterfinals; August 13
Risiglione (ARG) | PTS
Griffin (GBR) | L
Koivunen (FIN) | L
Vogt (GER) | PTS
Michelot (FRA) | PTS
Holm (DEN) | L
Havelka (TCH) | L
Leibbrandt (RSA) | PTS

Semifinals; August 14
Risiglione (ARG) | L
Vogt (GER) | PTS
Michelot (FRA) | PTS
Leibbrandt (RSA) | L

Final; August 15
Vogt (GER) | L
Michelot (FRA) | PTS
Bronze medal bout
Risiglione (ARG) | wo
Leibbrandt (RSA) | -
