= Boxing at the 1932 Summer Olympics – Heavyweight =

Boxing competitions

The men's heavyweight event was part of the boxing programme at the 1932 Summer Olympics. The weight class was the heaviest contested, and allowed boxers over 175 pounds (79.4 kilograms). The competition was held from Wednesday, August 10, 1932 to Saturday, August 13, 1932. Six boxers from six nations competed.

== Medalists ==
Gold	Silver	Bronze
Santiago Lovell; Argentina	Luigi Rovati; Italy	Frederick Feary; United States

== Results ==
Quarterfinals; August 10
Luigi Rovati (ITA)	—
bye	—
Frederick Feary (USA)	—
bye	—
George Maughan (CAN)	PTS
Heinz Kohlhaas (GER)	L
Santiago Lovell (ARG)	PTS
Gunnar Bärlund (FIN)	L

Semifinals; August 11
Rovati (ITA)	PTS
Feary (USA)	L
Maughan (CAN)	TKO
Lovell (ARG)	W

Final; August 13
Rovati (ITA)	L
Lovell (ARG)	PTS
Third place
Feary (USA)	wo
Maughan (CAN)	-
