= Hans-Georg =

Hans-Georg is a given name. Notable people with the name include:

- Hans-Georg Anscheidt (born 1935), Grand Prix motorcycle road racing World Champion
- Hans Georg von Arnim-Boitzenburg (1583–1641), Field Marshal of Holy Roman Empire and the Electorate of Saxony, diplomat, and politician
- Hans-Georg Aschenbach (born 1951), former East German ski jumper
- Hans-Georg Backhaus (born 1929), German economist and philosopher
- Hans Georg Berger, German-born photographer and writer who lives in Elba and in Laos
- Hans-Georg Beyer (born 1956), former East German handball player who competed in the 1980 Summer Olympics
- Hans Georg Bock (born 1948), German university professor for mathematics and scientific computing
- Hans-Georg Bohle, German geographer and development researcher
- Hans-Georg Borck (1921–2011), highly decorated Hauptmann in the Wehrmacht during World War II
- Hans-Georg Bürger (1952–1980), racing driver from West Germany
- Hans Georg Calmeyer (1903–1972), German lawyer who saved thousands of Jews from certain death during 1941 to 1945
- Hans-Georg von Charpentier, Sturmbannführer (Major) in the Waffen SS during World War II
- Hans-Georg Dallmer (born 1942), former East German pair skater who competed with partner Irene Müller
- Hans Georg Dehmelt (born 1922), German-born American physicist, co-developer of the ion trap technique
- Hans-Georg Dreßen (born 1964), retired German football player
- Hans-Georg Dulz (born 1936), retired German football player
- Hans Georg Feichtinger (born 1951), Austrian mathematician
- Hans-Georg von Friedeburg (1895–1945), the deputy commander of the U-Boat Forces of Nazi Germany
- Hans-Georg Gadamer (1900–2002), German philosopher of the continental tradition, best known for his 1960 work Truth and Method
- Hans Georg Friedrich Groß, (1860–1924), German balloonist and airship constructor
- Hans-Georg Herzog (1912–1959), highly decorated Oberstleutnant der Reserve in the Wehrmacht during World War II
- Hans Georg Herzog (born 1915), Romanian field handball player of German origin who competed in the 1936 Summer Olympics
- Hans-Georg Hess (1923–2008), German U-boat commander of the Second World War
- Hans-Georg Jaunich (born 1951), former East German handball player who competed in the 1980 Summer Olympics
- Hans-Georg Jörger (born 1903), German Olympic fencer
- Hans Georg Klamroth (1898–1944), involved in the 20 July Plot to assassinate Adolf Hitler
- Hans-Georg Kraus (born 1949), former professional German footballer
- Hans-Georg Leyser (1896–1980), highly decorated Generalmajor in the Wehrmacht during World War II
- Hans-Georg von der Marwitz, World War I flying ace credited with 15 aerial victories
- Hans-Georg Moldenhauer (born 1941), former football goalkeeper
- Hans Georg Nägeli (1773–1836), composer and music publisher
- Hans-Georg von der Osten began his career as a World War I flying ace credited with five aerial victories
- Hans-Georg Panczak (born 1952), German television actor and voice actor
- Hans Georg Rupp (1907–1989), German judge
- Hans-Georg Schierholz (1921–1986), highly decorated Oberfeldwebel in the Luftwaffe during World War II
- Hans-Georg Schwarzenbeck (born 1948), retired German football player
- Hans-Georg von Seidel (1891–1955), German military leader in the German Army during World War I and in the Luftwaffe during World War II
- Hans Georg Jacob Stang (minister of defence) (1858–1907), the Norwegian Minister of Defence 1900–1902 and 1902–1903
- Hans Georg Jacob Stang (prime minister) (1830–1907), the Norwegian Prime Minister in Stockholm 1888–1889
- Hans Georg Stehlin (1870–1941), Swiss paleontologist and geologist
- Hans-Georg Stephan (born 1950), German university professor specializing in European medieval archaeology and post-medieval archaeology
- Hans-Georg Stümke (1941–2002), German author, teacher, historian and publisher
- Hans-Georg Tersling (1857–1920), Danish architect who lived and worked for most of his life on the French Riviera
- Hans Georg Vaupel (born 1934), German sculptor
