= Aikoku =

Aikoku may refer to:

- Aikoku, Obihiro, Hokkaido
- Aikoku (motorbike)

== People with the given name ==
- Aikoku Hirabayashi (平林 愛国; 1909–?), Japanese boxer
