= Hans Berger (disambiguation) =

Hans Berger (1873–1941) was a German psychiatrist.

Hans Berger may also refer to:

- Hans Berger (aircraft manufacturer), Swiss inventor and helicopter builder
- Hans Berger (boxer) (1906–1973), German boxer
- Hans Georg Berger (born 1951), German-born photographer and writer
