= Boxing at the 1932 Summer Olympics =

Boxing at the Games of the X Olympiad
- Dates: 9-13 August 1932
- Competitors: 85 from 18 nations

These are the results of the boxing competition at the 1932 Summer Olympics in Los Angeles. Medals were awarded in eight weight classes. The competitions were held from August 9 to 13.

== Participating nations ==
A total of 85 boxers from 18 nations competed at the Los Angeles Games:

- Argentina (8)
- Canada (7)
- Denmark (2)
- Finland (2)
- France (6)
- Germany (8)
- Great Britain (3)
- Greece (1)
- Hungary (2)
- Ireland (4)
- Italy (8)
- Japan (5)
- Mexico (6)
- New Zealand (3)
- Philippines (4)
- South Africa (5)
- Sweden (3)
- United States (8)

NOTE: Including one South Korean boxer, who competed for Japan.

== Medal summary ==
Games	Gold	Silver	Bronze
Flyweight (−50.8 kg / 112 lb)	István Énekes; Hungary	Francisco Cabañas; Mexico	Louis Salica; United States
Bantamweight (−53.5 kg / 118 lb)	Horace Gwynne; Canada	Hans Ziglarski; Germany	José Villanueva; Philippines
Featherweight (−57.2 kg / 126 lb)	Carmelo Robledo; Argentina	Josef Schleinkofer; Germany	Allan Carlsson; Sweden
Lightweight (−61.2 kg / 135 lb)	Lawrence Stevens; South Africa	Thure Ahlqvist; Sweden	Nathan Bor; United States
Welterweight (−66.7 kg / 147 lb)	Edward Flynn; United States	Erich Campe; Germany	Bruno Ahlberg; Finland
Middleweight (−72.6 kg / 160 lb)	Carmen Barth; United States	Amado Azar; Argentina	Ernest Peirce; South Africa
Light heavyweight (−79.4 kg / 175 lb)	David Carstens; South Africa	Gino Rossi; Italy	Peter Jørgensen; Denmark
Heavyweight (over 79.4 kg/175 lb)	Santiago Lovell; Argentina	Luigi Rovati; Italy	Frederick Feary; United States

== Medal table ==
Rank	Nation	Gold	Silver	Bronze	Total
1	Argentina	2	1	0	3
2	United States	2	0	3	5
3	South Africa	2	0	1	3
4	Canada	1	0	0	1
4	Hungary	1	0	0	1
6	Germany	0	3	0	3
7	Italy	0	2	0	2
8	Sweden	0	1	1	2
9	Mexico	0	1	0	1
10	Denmark	0	0	1	1
10	Finland	0	0	1	1
10	Philippines	0	0	1	1
Totals (12 entries)		8	8	8	24
