= Carl Vinciquerra =

American boxer

Carl Vinciquerra (October 19, 1914 – November 10, 1997) was an American boxer who competed in the 1936 Summer Olympics. He resided in Omaha, Nebraska.

In 1936 he was eliminated in the first round of the light heavyweight class after losing his fight to Mohammed Amin of Egypt.

== 1936 Olympic results ==
Below is the record of Carl Vinciquerra, an American light heavyweight boxer who competed at the 1936 Berlin Olympics:

Round of 32: lost to Mohammed Amin (Egypt) by decision
