= Santiago Lovell =

Argentine boxer

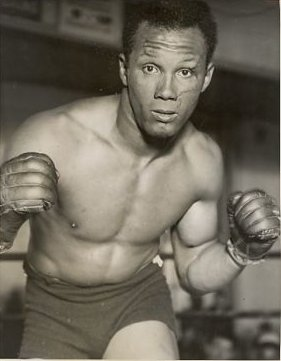
- Lovell in 1936

Personal information
- Full name: Santiago Alberto Lovell Birnes Sr.
- Nationality: Argentina
- Born: 23 April 1912 Dock Sud, Argentina
- Died: 17 March 1966 (aged 53)

Sport
- Sport: Boxing
- Weight class: Heavyweight
Medal record
Olympic Games
Gold medal – first place	1932 Los Angeles	Heavyweight

Santiago Alberto Lovell Birnes (23 April 1912 – 17 March 1966), known as Alberto Lovell, was an Argentine heavyweight boxer, who won the gold medal in the Olympic Games in Los Angeles 1932. In his career as a professional boxer he had 88 fights winning 76 (55 by KO) losing 8 (2 by KO) with 3 draws, He won both the Argentine and South American championships.

== Gold Medal in 1932 ==
Alberto Lovell, age 20, won the gold medal in the heavyweight category at the Olympic Games in Los Angeles 1932 . There were only six competitors in the heavyweight division. In the first round (a quarterfinal), Lovell eliminated the Finn Gunnar Barlund, and then Canadian George Maughan in the semifinals by TKO.

The final was held on 13 August with Lovell defeating the Italian Luigi Rovati, winning by knockout. Alberto Lovell's brother, William, attained the heavyweight silver medal in 1936. His son, Alberto Santiago, reached the heavyweight quarterfinals in Tokyo in 1964 also in the heavyweight classification.

== Career ==
After becoming professional, he became the Argentine and South American heavyweight champion on 19 November 1938. The title was taken off of him by the Asociación Argentina de Box on 7 July 1953 as he had not defended it since 1944.

His first professional fight was against Eduardo Primo on 20 January 1934, losing by technical knockout. Santiago Lovell also beat Red Burman and Maxie Rosenbloom. His last fight was against Archie Moore in the Luna Park in Buenos Aires on 7 July 1951.

== Personal life ==
His brother and son were also heavyweight boxers. Guillermo Lovell, his brother, won the silver medal at the 1936 Berlin Olympics. Santiago Alberto Lovell Jr, reached the quarter-finals in Tokyo 1964 Olympic Games.

== Professional boxing record ==
88 fights	76 wins	8 losses
By knockout	55	2
By decision	20	5
By disqualification	1	1
Draws	3	
No contests	1	

No.	Result	Record	Opponent	Type	Round, time	Date	Location	Notes
88	Loss	76–8–3 (1)	Archie Moore	KO	1 (12), 2:55	7 Jul 1951	Estadio Luna Park, Buenos Aires, Argentina	
87	Win	76–7–3 (1)	Américo Capitanelli	KO	3 (10)	7 Apr 1951	Mar del Plata, Buenos Aires Province, Argentina	
86	Win	75–7–3 (1)	Américo Capitanelli	TKO	4	9 Apr 1949	Argentina	Exact location unknown; Not listed on BoxRec
85	Win	74–7–3 (1)	Américo Capitanelli	TKO	2 (4)	7 Apr 1949	Club Atlético San Lorenzo de Almagro, Buenos Aires, Argentina	
84	Wi	73–7–3 (1)	Juan Urlich	TKO	10 (10)	26 Mar 1949	Club Atlético San Lorenzo de Almagro, Buenos Aires, Argentina	
83	Win	72–7–3 (1)	Alfredo Lagay	PTS	10	11 Feb 1949	Club Atlético Atlanta, Buenos Aires, Argentina	
82	Win	71–7–3 (1)	Américo Capitanelli	KO	2	16 Oct 1948	Ciudad Mendoza, Mendoza Province, Argentina	
81	Win	70–7–3 (1)	Juan Urlich	KO	7	3 Apr 1948	Bahía Blanca, Buenos Aires Province, Argentina	
80	Win	69–7–3 (1)	Abelardo Acosta	TKO	4 (8)	16 Nov 1947	Plaza de Toros, Valencia, Spain	
79	Win	68–7–3 (1)	Carl Nielsen	TKO	6 (10)	5 Oct 1947	Plaza de Toros Monumental, Barcelona, Spain	
78	Win	67–7–3 (1)	António Soares	KO	8 (10)	30 Nov 1946	Ginásio do Estádio Pacaembu, São Paulo, Brazil	
77	Win	66–7–3 (1)	Alfredo Lagay	KO	7 (10)	16 Nov 1946	Ginásio do Estádio Pacaembu, São Paulo, Brazil	
76	Loss	65–7–3 (1)	Alfredo Lagay	DQ	5 (10)	19 Oct 1946	Ginásio do Estádio Pacaembu, São Paulo, Brazil	Lovell was disqualified for hitting Lagay in the neck
75	Win	65–6–3 (1)	Ángel Sotillo	PTS	10	28 Sep 1946	Ginásio do Estádio Pacaembu, São Paulo, Brazil	
74	Win	64–6–3 (1)	Irineo Caldera	KO	3 (10)	14 Sep 1946	Estádio Vasco da Gama, Rio de Janeiro, Brazil	
73	Win	63–6–3 (1)	Juan Urlich	KO	7 (10)	9 Sep 1946	Ginásio do Estádio Pacaembu, São Paulo, Brazil	
72	Win	62–6–3 (1)	Irineo Caldera	KO	2 (10)	17 Aug 1946	Estádio Municipal do Pacaembu, São Paulo, Brazil	
71	Win	61–6–3 (1)	Ángel Sotillo	PTS	10	28 Dec 1945	Asunción, Paraguay	
70	Win	60–6–3 (1)	Américo Capitanelli	KO	2	8 Sep 1945	Cosquín, Córdoba Province, Argentina	
69	Win	59–6–3 (1)	Eusebio Ramírez	KO	2	18 Aug 1945	Córdoba, Córdoba Province, Argentina	
68	Win	58–6–3 (1)	Pablo Ramírez	TKO	3	11 Aug 1945	Córdoba, Córdoba Province, Argentina	
67	Win	57–6–3 (1)	Eusebio Ramírez	KO	2	28 Mar 1945	Asunción, Paraguay	
66	Win	56–6–3 (1)	Eusebio Ramírez	KO	4	15 Mar 1945	Posadas, Misiones Province, Argentina	Uncertain of date
65	Win	55–6–3 (1)	Américo Capitanelli	KO	2	1 Mar 1945	Posadas, Misiones Province, Argentina	Uncertain of date
64	NC	54–6–3 (1)	Arturo Godoy	NC	11 (12)	15 Apr 1944	Lima, Lima Province, Peru	For South American heavyweight title; Bout was halted for lack of combativity
63	Win	54–6–3	Eduardo Primo	KO	9	16 Feb 1944	Lima, Lima Province, Peru	
62	Win	53–6–3	Ángel Sotillo	KO	9 (12)	26 Jan 1944	Estadio Luna Park, Buenos Aires, Argentina	Retained Argentine heavyweight title
61	Win	52–6–3	Américo Capitanelli	KO	3	1 Oct 1943	Buenos Aires, Distrito Federal, Argentina	Exact date unknown; Not listed on BoxRec
60	Win	51–6–3	Juan Urlich	KO	7	1 Sep 1943	Estadio Luna Park, Buenos Aires, Argentina	Exact date unknown; Not listed on BoxRec
59	Win	50–6–3	Antonio Francia	KO	8	7 Aug 1943	Salta, Salta Province, Argentina	
58	Win	49–6–3	Antonio Francia	PTS	10	31 Jul 1943	San Miguel de Tucumán, Tucumán Province, Argentina	
57	Win	48–6–3	Eduardo Primo	PTS	12	24 Jul 1943	Estadio Luna Park, Buenos Aires, Argentina	Retained Argentine heavyweight title
56	Win	47–6–3	Eduardo Primo	PTS	12	3 Jul 1943	Córdoba, Córdoba Province, Argentina	
55	Win	46–6–3	Eduardo Primo	PTS	12	5 Jun 1943	Córdoba, Córdoba Province, Argentina	
54	Win	45–6–3	Francisco Risiglione	KO	5 (12)	29 May 1943	Estadio Luna Park, Buenos Aires, Argentina	Retained Argentine heavyweight title
53	Win	44–6–3	Irineo Caldera	KO	4	19 May 1943	Córdoba, Córdoba Province, Argentina	
52	Win	43–6–3	Antonio Francia	PTS	10	21 Mar 1943	San Rafael, Mendoza Province, Argentina	
51	Win	42–6–3	Pablo Ramírez	PTS	12	13 Mar 1943	Ciudad Mendoza, Mendoza Province, Argentina	
50	Loss	41–6–3	Arturo Godoy	PTS	12	28 Feb 1943	Estasio de Carabineros, Santiago, Chile	Lost South American heavyweight title
49	Draw	41–5–3	Francisco Risiglione	PTS	10	3 Feb 1943	Rosario, Santa Fe Province, Argentina	
48	Win	41–5–2	Eusebio Ramírez	TKO	3	21 Jan 1943	La Plata, Buenos Aires Province, Argentina	
47	Win	40–5–2	Eusebio Ramírez	KO	3	17 Dec 1942	Córdoba, Córdoba Province, Argentina	
46	Win	39–5–2	Eusebio Ramírez	TKO	6	8 Jul 1942	Mar del Plata, Buenos Aires Province, Argentina	
45	Win	38–5–2	Fernando Menichelli	RTD	7 (12)	4 Jul 1942	Estadio Luna Park, Buenos Aires, Argentina	Retained Argentine and South American heavyweight titles
44	Loss	37–5–2	Roscoe Toles	PTS	12	23 May 1942	Estadio Luna Park, Buenos Aires, Argentina	
43	Draw	37–4–2	Roscoe Toles	PTS	12	21 Mar 1942	Estadio Luna Park, Buenos Aires, Argentina	
42	Win	37–4–1	Arturo Godoy	UD	12	17 Jan 1942	Estadio Luna Park, Buenos Aires, Argentina	Retained South American heavyweight title
41	Loss	36–4–1	Roscoe Toles	PTS	12	22 Nov 1941	Estadio Luna Park, Buenos Aires, Argentina	
40	Win	36–3–1	Eusebio Ramírez	KO	4 (10)	8 Nov 1941	Luna Park, San Juan, Argentina	
39	Win	35–3–1	Arturo Godoy	UD	12	17 May 1941	Estadio Luna Park, Buenos Aires, Argentina	Retained South American heavyweight title
38	Win	34–3–1	Eusebio Ramírez	TKO	5 (10)	3 Jan 1941	Estadio del Sporting Club, Montevideo, Uruguay	
37	Win	33–3–1	Ernesto Carnese	KO	3 (12)	21 Dec 1940	Estadio Luna Park, Buenos Aires, Argentina	
36	Win	32–3–1	Fernando Centurión	TKO	3 (10)	5 Dec 1940	Estadio No. 2 de Rosario Central, Rosario, Argentia	
35	Win	31–3–1	Eusebio Ramírez	KO	4	1 Oct 1940	Misiones, Misiones Province, Argentina	Exact date unknown
34	Win	30–3–1	Américo Capitanelli	TKO	2	1 Sep 1940	Misiones, Misiones Province, Argentina	Exact date unknown; Not listed on BoxRec
33	Win	29–3–1	Ernesto Carnese	KO	5 (12)	15 Jun 1940	Estadio Luna Park, Buenos Aires, Argentina	Retained Argentine heavyweight title
32	Win	28–3–1	Valentín Campolo	TKO	9 (12)	21 Oct 1939	Estadio Luna Park, Buenos Aires, Argentina	Retained South American heavyweight title
31	Win	27–3–1	Eduardo Primo	UD	12	23 Sep 1939	Estadio Luna Park, Buenos Aires, Argentina	Won South American heavyweight title
30	Loss	26–3–1	Arturo Godoy	PTS	12	8 Apr 1939	Estadio Luna Park, Buenos Aires, Argentina	Lost South American heavyweight title
29	Win	26–2–1	Italo Motelli	TKO	2 (10)	11 Feb 1939	Club Atlético Unión, Santa Fe, Argentina	
28	Win	25–2–1	Fernando Centurión	TKO	2	4 Feb 1939	Chaco, Chaco Province, Argentina	
27	Win	24–2–1	Julio Di Pauli	TKO	3	28 Jan 1939	Corrientes, Corrientes Province, Argentina	
26	Win	23–2–1	Valentín Campolo	UD	12	19 Nov 1938	Estadio Luna Park, Buenos Aires, Argentina	Won vacant Argentine and South American heavyweight titles
25	Win	22–2–1	Hans Havlíček	TKO	4 (12)	10 Sep 1938	Estadio Luna Park, Buenos Aires, Argentina	
24	Win	21–2–1	Arturo Godoy	UD	12	23 Jul 1938	Estadio Luno Park, Buenos Aires, Argentina	
23	Win	20–2–1	Eduardo Primo	PTS	12	5 May 1938	Parque Romano, Buenos Aires, Argentina	
22	Draw	19–2–1	André Langlet	PTS	10	19 Mar 1938	U.S.	Exact location unknown; Not listed on BoxRec
21	Loss	19–2	Gunnar Bärlund	PTS	10	29 Dec 1937	Hippodrome, New York City, New York, U.S.	
20	Win	19–1	Tom Beaupre	KO	1 (6), 2:59	26 Nov 1937	Madison Square Garden, New York City, New York, U.S.	
19	Win	18–1	Eddie Blunt	UD	10	12 Nov 1937	Hippodrome, New York City, New York, U.S.	
18	Win	17–1	Mickey McAvoy	KO	3 (10), 0:18	13 Aug 1937	Coliseum, San Diego, California, U.S.	
17	Win	16–1	Red Burman	PTS	10	26 Jul 1937	Gilmore Stadium, Los Angeles, California, U.S.	
16	Win	15–1	Eddie Simms	PTS	10	13 Jul 1937	Olympic Auditorium, Los Angeles, California, U.S.	
15	Win	14–1	Hank Hankinson	KO	3 (10), 2:21	7 May 1937	Coliseum, San Diego, California, U.S.	
14	Win	13–1	Maxie Rosenbloom	PTS	10	27 Apr 1937	Olympic Auditorium, Los Angeles, California, U.S.	
13	Win	12–1	André Langlet	PTS	10	30 Mar 1937	Olympic Auditorium, Los Angeles, California, U.S.	
12	Win	11–1	Moose Irwin	TKO	4 (10), 1:25	19 Mar 1937	Coliseum, San Diego, California, U.S.	
11	Win	10–1	Siska Habarta	TKO	1 (10)	29 Aug 1936	Estadio Manco Cápac, Lima, Peru	
10	Win	9–1	Esteban Senestraro	KO	1 (10)	28 Mar 1936	Quilmes, Buenos Aires Province, Argentina	
9	Win	8–1	Gino Calabressi	KO	1	1 Feb 1936	Concordia, Entre Ríos Province, Argentina	Exact date unknown
8	Win	7–1	Esteban Senestraro	KO	1	1 Jan 1936	Quilmes, Buenos Aires Province, Argentina	Exact date unknown; Not listed on BoxRec
7	Win	6–1	Mauro Galusso	KO	1 (12)	6 Jul 1935	Estadio Manco Cápac, Lima, Peru	
6	Win	5–1	Vicente Parrile	KO	1	25 May 1935	Lima, Lima Province, Peru	
5	Win	4–1	Mauro Galusso	KO	3 (10)	4 May 1935	Estadio Manco Cápac, Lima, Peru	
4	Win	3–1	Peter Johnson	KO	1	1 Mar 1935	Lima, Lima Province, Peru	Exact date unknown
3	Win	2–1	Justo Prieto	DQ	2	1 Jun 1934	Santiago del Estero, Santiago del Estero Province, Argentina	Exact date unknown
2	Win	1–1	Siska Habarta	TKO	4 (8)	28 Apr 1934	Estadio Luna Park, Buenos Aires, Argentina	
1	Loss	0–1	Eduardo Primo	TKO	7 (12)	20 Jan 1934	Estadio Luna Park, Buenos Aires, Argentina	

== See also ==
- Sport in Argentina
- Boxing
- Argentina at the Olympics
