= Wim Fock =

Dutch boxer

Willem "Wim" Frederik Fock (28 July 1909 in Amsterdam – 11 September 1984 in Den Helder) was a Dutch boxer who competed in the 1936 Summer Olympics.

In 1936 he defeated the Chinese boxer Wang Yunlan on points in the first round and was eliminated in the second round of the light heavyweight class after losing his fight to Børge Holm.
