= Bert Lowe =

New Zealand boxer (1912–1933)

Personal information
- Full name: Albert Sidney Lowe
- Born: 31 May 1912 Dunedin, New Zealand
- Died: 23 October 1933 (aged 21) Greymouth, New Zealand

Sport
- Country: New Zealand
- Sport: Boxing

Achievements and titles
- National finals: Amateur welterweight champion (1930, 1931); Professional middleweight champion (1933)

Albert Sidney Lowe (31 May 1912 – 23 October 1933) was a New Zealand boxer who represented his country at the 1932 Olympic Games in Los Angeles. He subsequently turned professional, winning the national professional middleweight title in 1933.

== Biography ==
Born in Dunedin in 1912, Lowe was educated at the Christian Brothers' High School in that city. He twice won the national amateur welterweight title, in 1930 and 1931.

== 1932 Olympic Games ==
Lowe was one of three New Zealand boxers to compete at the 1932 Olympic Games in Los Angeles. Fighting in the middleweight division, Lowe lost his first-round fight to Hans Bernlöhr, a German.

== Professional boxing career ==
After returning from the Olympic Games, Lowe turned professional, winning his first three fights, including defeating George McEwan for the New Zealand professional middleweight title in Dunedin on 12 June 1933. However, in a fight at Greymouth against Harry Lister on 21 October 1933, Lowe collapsed during the 12th round, and died two days later in Grey Hospital from a haemorrhage of the brain. He was buried at Dunedin Southern Cemetery.
