= Heinz Kohlhaas =

German boxer

Heinz Kohlhaas (20 July 1912 – 2 January 1993) was a German boxer who competed in the 1932 Summer Olympics.

He was born in Hamm, Westphalia.

In 1932 he was eliminated in the first round of the heavyweight class after losing his bout to the Canadian George Maughan.
