= Walter van Bueren =

Swiss boxer

Walter von Büren (born 21 June 1912, date of death unknown) was a Swiss boxer who competed in the 1936 Summer Olympics. In 1936 he was eliminated in the first round of the light heavyweight class after losing his fight to Leslie Harley.
