= Katsuo Kameoka =

Japanese boxer

Katsuo Kameoka (亀岡 勝雄, Kameoka Katsuo, 23 March 1905 in Koori, Fukushima, Japan – 14 November 1945) was a Japanese boxer who competed in the 1932 Summer Olympics.

In 1932 he was eliminated in the first round of the featherweight class after losing his fight to the upcoming bronze medalist Allan Carlsson.
