= Antonio Adipe =

Uruguayan boxer

Antonio Ricardo Adipe Marrone (24 April 1912 – 16 June 1989) was an Uruguayan boxer who competed in the 1936 Summer Olympics. In 1936 he was eliminated in the second round of the light heavyweight class after losing his fight to Thomas Griffin of Great Britain.

== 1936 Olympic results ==
- Round of 32: bye
- Round of 16: lost to Thomas Griffin (Great Britain) by decision
