= Nikolaos Mastoridis =

Greek boxer

Personal information
- Nationality: Greek

Sport
- Sport: Boxing

Nikolaos Mastoridis was a Greek boxer. He competed in the men's light heavyweight event at the 1932 Summer Olympics. At the 1932 Summer Olympics in Los Angeles, he lost to Gino Rossi of Italy in a quarterfinal. There were only eight boxers in the light heavyweight tournament.
