= Aldo Longinotti =

Italian boxer

Personal information
- Nationality: Italian
- Born: 27 December 1909; Bettola, Italy
- Died: 30 August 1986 (aged 76)

Sport
- Sport: Boxing

Aldo Longinotti (27 December 1909 – 30 August 1986) was an Italian boxer. He competed in the men's middleweight event at the 1932 Summer Olympics. At the 1932 Summer Olympics, he lost to Amado Azar of Argentina.
