= Jarl Johnsen =

Norwegian boxer

Jarl Johnsen (September 17, 1913 – December 13, 1986) was a Norwegian boxer who competed in the 1936 Summer Olympics.

He was born in Stavanger.

In 1936 he eliminated in the first round of the light heavyweight class after losing his fight to Robey Leibbrandt.
