= Vaupel =

Vaupel is a surname originating from Germany. Notable people with the surname include:

- Egon Vaupel (born 1950), German politician (SPD)
- Friedrich Karl Johann Vaupel (1876–1927), German botanist
- Hans Georg Vaupel (born 1934), German sculptor
- James Vaupel (born 1945), American demographer
