= Louis Lavoie =

Canadian boxer

Personal information
- Nationality: Canadian
- Born: 1905
- Died: 1 August 1947 (aged 41–42)

Sport
- Sport: Boxing

Louis Lavoie (1905 – 1 August 1947) was a Canadian boxer. He competed in the men's middleweight event at the 1932 Summer Olympics. At the 1932 Summer Olympics, he lost to Roger Michelot of France.
