= Pol Goffaux =

Belgian boxer

Paul "Pol" Goffaux (2 November 1916 – 29 March 1977) was a Belgian boxer who competed in the 1936 Summer Olympics.

In 1936 he was eliminated in the first round of the light heavyweight class after losing his fight to František Havelka.
