= John Hines (boxer) =

American boxer

John A. Hines (July 30, 1912 – December 11, 1966) was an American boxer who competed in the 1932 Summer Olympics.

He was born in Indiana and died in Los Angeles, California.

In 1932 he was eliminated in the quarter-finals of the featherweight class after losing his fight to the upcoming bronze medalist Allan Carlsson.
