= Harold Thomas (boxer) =

New Zealand boxer (1909–1933)

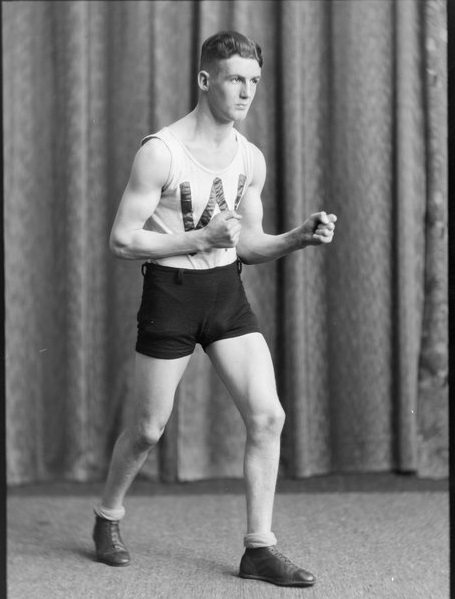
Thomas c. 1929

Harold Frederick Thomas (11 January 1909 – 29 March 1933) was a New Zealand boxer who competed in the 1932 Summer Olympics. He was eliminated in the first round of the welterweight class after losing his fight to Italy's Luciano Fabbroni. Thomas was born in Wellington. He died in Wellington aged 24, less than a year after his appearance at the Olympics. He jumped from a train a few hours after learning about the death of his fiancée.
