= Bolzan =

Bolzan is an Italian surname. Notable people with the surname include:

- Adaílton (footballer, born 1977), full name Adaílton Martins Bolzan, Brazilian footballer
- Erminio Bolzan (1914–1993), Italian boxer
- Riccardo Bolzan (born 1984), Italian footballer
- Scott Bolzan (born 1962), American former football player

== See also ==
- Bolzano
- Francesco Bolzoni, Italian footballer
