= Lajos Szigeti =

Hungarian boxer

Lajos Szigeti (27 November 1906 – 27 April 1974) was a Hungarian boxer who competed in the 1932 Summer Olympics and in the 1936 Summer Olympics. He was born in Budapest.

In 1932 he was eliminated in the quarterfinals of the middleweight class after losing his fight to the eventual bronze medalist Ernest Peirce of South Africa. Four years later he lost in the second round of the 1936 Olympic middleweight class against Josef Hrubeš.

== 1932 Olympic results ==
- Round of 16: bye
- Quarterfinal: lost to Ernest Peirce (South Africa) by decision
