= Manuel Cruz =

Manuel Cruz may refer to:

- Manuel Cruz (boxer) (fl. 1930s), Mexican boxer
- Manuel Cruz Ferrada (fl. 1930s), Chilean politician
- Manuel Cruz Rodríguez (born 1951), Spanish philosopher and politician, 60th President of the Spanish Senate
- Manuel Aurelio Cruz (born 1953), Cuban American prelate of the Roman Catholic Church
- Manuel Marrero Cruz (born 1963), Prime Minister of Cuba
