= Jim Murphy (boxer) =

Irish boxer

Personal information
- Nationality: Irish
- Born: 5 December 1903; Cork, Ireland
- Died: 28 December 1987 (aged 84); London, England

Sport
- Sport: Boxing

Jim Murphy (5 December 1903 – 28 December 1987) was an Irish boxer. He competed in the men's light heavyweight event at the 1932 Summer Olympics. At the 1932 Summer Olympics, he defeated Johnny Miler, before losing to Gino Rossi and Peter Jorgensen, both by walkovers, thus conceding the bout for the bronze medal.
