= Jean-Pierre Graser =

Luxembourgish boxer

Jean-Pierre "Jim" Graser (9 November 1914 in Gonderange – 2 March 1979) was a Luxembourgish boxer who competed in the 1936 Summer Olympics.

In 1936 he was eliminated in the second round of the light heavyweight class after losing his fight to the eventual bronze medalist Francisco Risiglione.

== 1936 Olympic results ==
Below is the record of Jean-Pierre Graser, a Luxembourgish light heavyweight boxer who competed at the 1936 Berlin Olympics:

- Round of 32: bye
- Round of 16: lost to Francisco Risiglione (Argentina) by decision
