= Paul Schweifer =

Austrian boxer

Paul Schweifer (30 March 1914 – 21 November 1941 in Kursk) was an Austrian boxer who competed in the 1936 Summer Olympics.

In 1936 he was eliminated in the first round of the light heavyweight class after losing his fight to Børge Holm.

== 1936 Olympic results ==
Below is the record of Paul Schweifer, an Austrian light heavyweight boxer who competed at the 1936 Berlin Olympics:

- Round of 32: lost to Børge Holm (Denmark) by decision
