= Oliver Shanks =

Canadian boxer

Personal information
- Full name: Oliver Joseph Shanks
- Born: 15 November 1915 Edmonton, Canada
- Died: 27 May 1970 (aged 54) Montreal, Canada

Sport
- Sport: boxing

Oliver Joseph Shanks (November 15, 1915 – May 27, 1970) was a Canadian boxer who competed in the 1936 Summer Olympics.

He was born in Edmonton, Alberta, but later took up residence in Montreal, Quebec.

In 1936 he was eliminated in the second round of the light heavyweight class after losing his fight to Hannes Koivunen. He turned pro shortly after his return home to Canada.

== 1936 Olympic results ==
Below is the record of Oliver Shanks, a Canadian light heavyweight boxer who competed at the 1936 Berlin Olympics:

- Round of 32: bye
- Round of 16: lost to Hannes Koivunen (Finland) by decision
