= The Fourth Reich (film) =

1990 South African drama film

- Directed by: Manie van Rensburg
- Written by: Malcolm Kohll
- Based on: Real events
- Produced by: Gert Basson; Mark Jaffee; David Selvan; Bill Shapter; Reg Wessels
- Starring: Ryno Hattingh; Marius Weyers; Grethe Fox; Percy Sieff
- Cinematography: Dewald Aukema
- Edited by: Nena Olwage
- Music by: Louis van Rensburg
- Distributed by: Thames Television
- Release date: 10 August 1990 (South Africa)
- Running time: 183 min.
- Country: South Africa
- Language: English
- Budget: ZAR 16,000,000

The Fourth Reich (El Cuatro Reich) is a 1990 South African biographical drama film directed by Manie van Rensburg and co-produced by Gert Basson, Mark Jaffee, David Selvan, Bill Shapter and Reg Wessels for Zastron Films. The film stars an ensemble South Africa cast, with Ryno Hattingh starring in the lead as Robey Leibbrandt. Supporting cast included Marius Weyers, Grethe Fox and Percy Sieff. Also supporting were many popular South African dramatists.

The film revolves around the life of Robey Leibbrandt, a South African boxer who participated in the 1936 Olympic Games in Berlin. While at the Games he was courted by the Nazis in an attempt to recruit him as an agent in South Africa. Leibbrandt embraced Nazi ideology, which culminated in his becoming an Abwehr agent for the Third Reich. As an Abwehr agent in 1939, Leibbrandt led an operation to overthrow the South African pro-Allied government, and to assassinate General Jan Smuts, at the time Prime Minister of the Union of South Africa.

The Fourth Reich was the most expensive film production in South African cinema history.

The Fourth Reich played well at international film festivals and received widespread acclaim and positive reviews.

== Cast ==
- Ryno Hattingh as Robey Leibbrandt
- Marius Weyers as Jan Taillard
- Grethe Fox as Erna Dorfman
- Percy Sieff as Louis Esselen
- Elize Cawood as Romy Taillard
- Pierre Knoesen as Dice Lotter
- Ian Roberts as Johannes van der Walt
- Marcel van Heerden as Hendrik Erasmus
- Louis van Niekerk as General Smuts
- James Borthwick as Sidney Cohen
- Keith Grenville as Pierre van Ryneveld
- Sandra Kotzé as Mrs. Leibbrandt
- Annabel Linder as Nadia Cohen
- Tertius Meintjes as Doors Erasmus
- Ernest Ndlovu as Sipho
- Eric Nobbs as Hennie Schoeman
- Brian O'Shaughnessy as Major Ellis
- Dan Robbertse as Kalie Theron
- Cobus Rossouw as Dr. Hans van Rensburg
- Ron Smerczak as General Karlowa
- Carel Trichardt as Meyder Leibbrandt
- James White as Major Hattingh
- Christine Basson as Kiosk Lady
- Will Bernard as Barman
- Pieter Brand as Pat Jerling
- Kerneels Coertzen as Van Rensburg burly
- Vanessa Cooke as Wanda Stander
- Michael Copley as Kruger
- Crispin De Nuys as Captain Nissen
- Gideon De Wet as Policeman
- Anton Dekker as Fourie
- Frantz Dobrowsky as Shelver
- Wilson Dunster as Charlie Vosloo
- Ernst Eloff as Beetge
- Annette Engelbrecht as Ouma Smuts
- Bill Flynn as Boxing Doctor
- Adrian Galley as Hansie
- Ben Kruger as Oosthuizen
- Greg Latter as Heckler
- Dale Lee as African Mirror
- Nico Liebenberg as Sgt Pauley
- Patrick Lyster as Sgt. Spengler
- Johan Niemandt as Wolmarans
- Deon Opperman as Van Rensburg burly
- Tjaart Potgieter as Lahousen
- Nicky Rebelo as Van Rensburg burly
- André Rossouw as Dominee
- Robin Smith as Sgt Meintjes
- Wilna Snyman as Soprano
- Wilma Stockenström as Mrs. Engelbrecht
- André Stolz as Saunders
- Richard van der Westhuizen as Hirsh
- Jan van Deventer as Steyn
- Pierre van Pletzen as Hertzog
- Eric van Rensburg as Judge
- Herbie Vermuellen as Michelot
- James Whyte as Snyman
- Andrew Worsdale as Joos Engelbrecht
