= Al Romero =

American boxer (1911–1985)

Personal information
- Nationality: Mexican
- Born: 6 September 1911; Los Angeles, California, United States
- Died: 30 September 1985 (aged 74); Alhambra, California, United States

Sport
- Sport: Boxing

Al Romero (6 September 1911 – 30 September 1985) was a Mexican boxer. He competed in the men's welterweight event at the 1932 Summer Olympics.
