= Henri Walter =

French boxer

Personal information
- Nationality: French
- Born: 14 February 1910; Seloncourt, France
- Died: 9 January 1945 (aged 34); Surgères, France

Sport
- Sport: Boxing

Henri Ulysse Walter (14 February 1910 – 9 January 1945) was a French boxer. He competed in the men's featherweight event at the 1932 Summer Olympics. He was killed during the Second World War.

Walter also served in the 78th Infantry Regiment of the French Army during the Second World War and was taken prisoner by German forces. He was killed during an escape attempt on 9 January 1945.
