= Luigi Rovati =

Italian boxer (1904–1989)

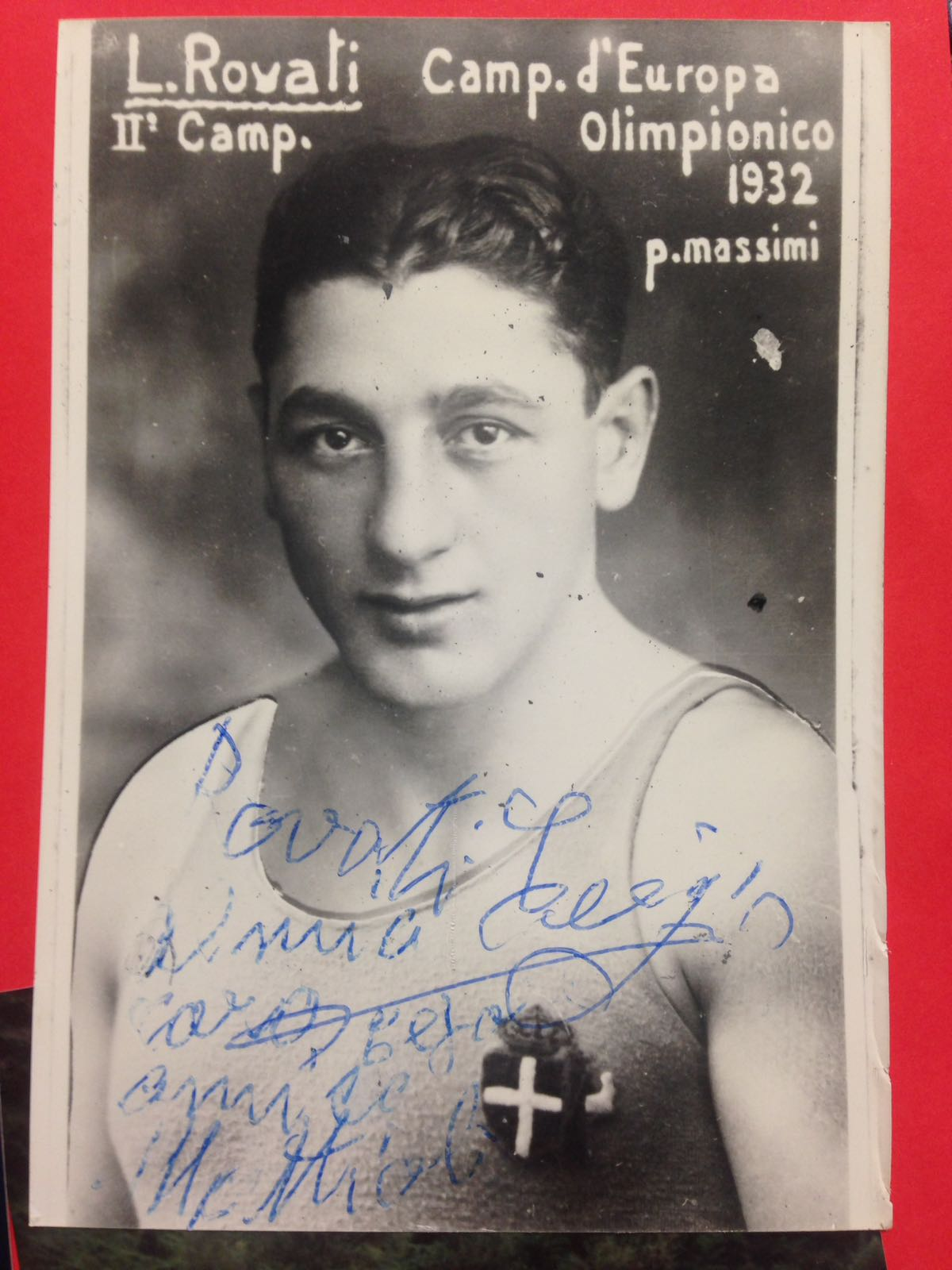

Medal record

Men's Boxing

Representing Italy

Olympic Games
| Silver medal – second place | 1932 Los Angeles | Heavyweight |

Luigi Rovati (24 November 1904 – 28 January 1989) was an Italian boxer who competed in the 1932 Summer Olympics. He was born in Cinisello Balsamo. In 1932, he was awarded the silver medal in the heavyweight class after losing the final against Santiago Lovell of Argentina.

== 1932 Olympic boxing results ==
- Quarterfinal: bye
- Semifinal: defeated Frederick Feary (United States) on points
- Final: lost to Santiago Lovell (Argentina) on points (was awarded silver medal)
