= Rafael Lang =

Argentine boxer (1909–2002)

Personal information
- Nationality: Argentine
- Born: 23 November 1909 Bucharest, Romania
- Died: 1 March 2002 (aged 92) Castellón de la Plana, Spain

Sport
- Sport: Boxing

Rafael Lang (23 November 1909 – 1 March 2002) was a Romanian-born Argentine boxer. He competed in the men's light heavyweight event at the 1932 Summer Olympics.
