= Hannes Koivunen =

Finnish boxer

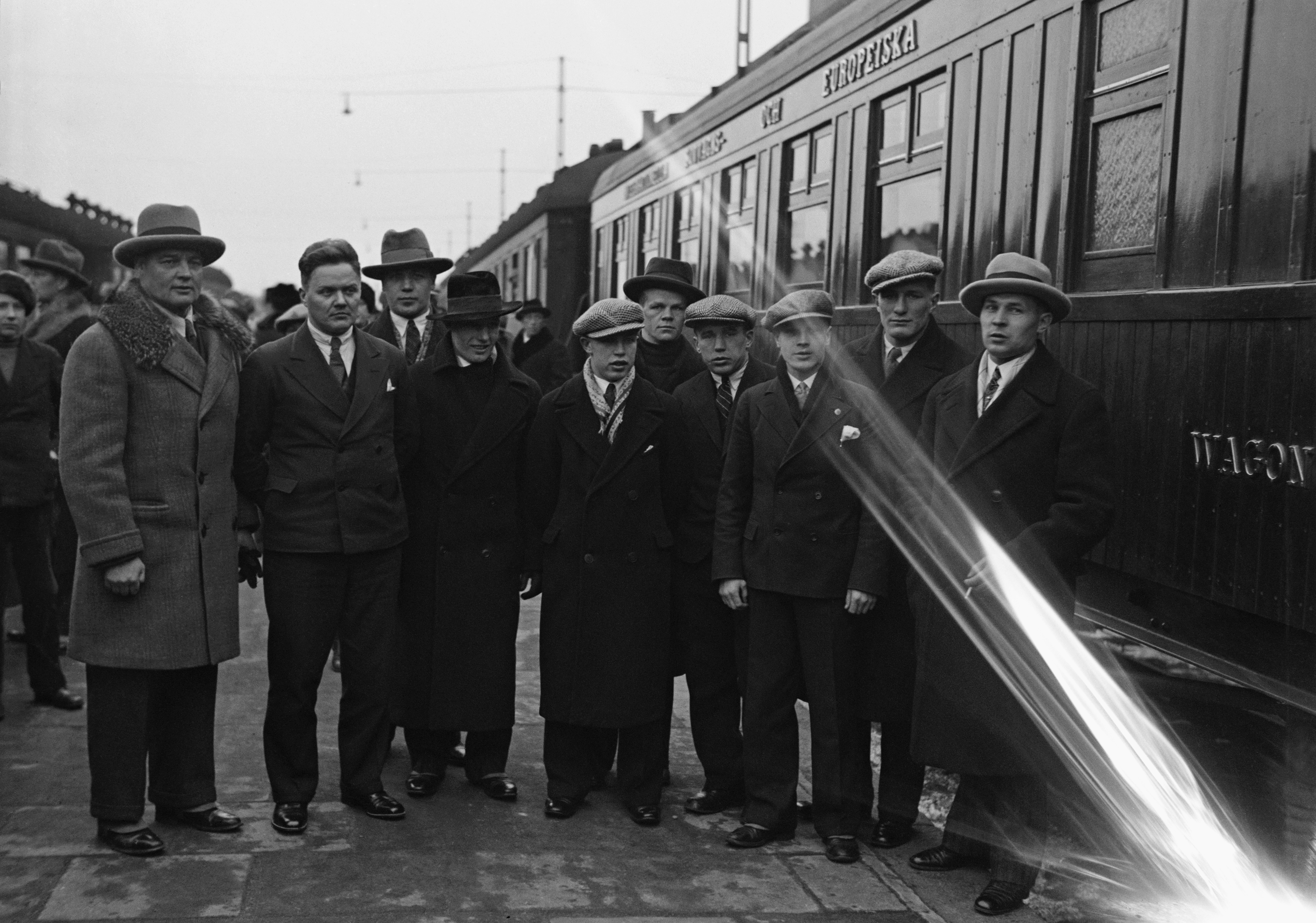
Finnish A-team in boxing leaving for Stockholm 19.2.1932. In no particular order: Runar Dickman, Pave Savolainen, Valfrid Resch, Bruno Ahlberg, Onni Saari, Hannes Koivunen, Gunnar Bärlund (2nd from right), Smeds (utmost left), Ertamo, Stenvall

Johannes "Hannes" Evert Koivunen (August 24, 1911, Helsinki – September 29, 1990) was a Finnish boxer who competed in the 1936 Summer Olympics.

He was born and died in Helsinki.

In 1936 he was eliminated in the quarterfinals of the light heavyweight class after losing his fight to the upcoming silver medalist Richard Vogt.
