= Wang Runlan =

Chinese boxer

Wang Runlan (simplified Chinese: 王润兰; traditional Chinese: 王潤蘭; pinyin: Wáng Rùnlán; 28 May 1913 – 21 September 1937), or Wang Yunlan, was a Chinese soldier and boxer.

He competed for the Republic of China in the 1936 Summer Olympics, and was eliminated in the first round of the light heavyweight class after losing his fight to Wim Fock.

Wang was killed in a battle against the Japanese army on 21 September 1937 during the Second Sino-Japanese War.
