= Josef Schleinkofer =

German boxer

Olympic medal record

Men's Boxing

Representing Germany
| Silver medal – second place | 1932 Los Angeles | featherweight |

Josef Schleinkofer (March 19, 1910 in Munich – 1984) was a German boxer who competed in the 1932 Summer Olympics.

== Amateur career ==
In 1932 he won the silver medal in the featherweight class after losing the final against Carmelo Robledo.

=== Olympic results ===
- 1932 won the Featherweight silver medal at the Los Angeles Olympics. Results were:
  - Defeated John Keller (Canada) PTS
  - Defeated Gaspare Alessandri (Italy) PTS
  - Lost to Carmelo Ambrosio (Argentina) PTS
