= Erminio Bolzan =

Italian boxer

Erminio Bolzan (11 March 1914 – 26 January 1993) was an Italian boxer who competed in the 1936 Summer Olympics. In 1936 he was eliminated in the second round of the light heavyweight class after losing his fight to the upcoming silver medalist Richard Vogt.
