= Erich Campe =

German boxer (1912–1977)

Olympic medal record

Men's Boxing

Representing Germany
Silver medal – second place	1932 Los Angeles	Welterweight

Erich Campe (1 February 1912 – 5 May 1977) was a German boxer who competed in the 1932 Summer Olympics.

He was born in Berlin.

== Amateur career ==
In 1932 he won the silver medal in the welterweight class after losing the final against Edward Flynn. Campe was the German Welterweight Champion 1932 and 1934.

Olympic results

- Defeated Aikoku Hirabayashi (Japan) PTS
- Defeated Carl Jensen (Denmark) PTS
- Defeated Bruno Ahlberg (Finland) PTS
- Lost to Edward Flynn (USA) PTS
