= Mohammed Amin (boxer) =

Egyptian boxer

Mohammed Amin (born November 15, 1913, date of death unknown) was an Egyptian boxer who competed in the 1936 Summer Olympics. In 1936 he was eliminated in the second round of the light heavyweight class after losing his fight to Robey Leibbrandt of South Africa.

== 1936 Olympic results ==
- Round of 32: defeated Carl Vinciquerra (United States) on points
- Round of 16: lost to Robey Leibbrandt (South Africa) on points
