= Miguel Araico =

Mexican boxer

Personal information
- Full name: Miguel Araico Álvarez
- Born: 22 September 1914 Mexico City, Mexico

Sport
- Sport: Boxing

Miguel Araico Álvarez (born 22 September 1914, date of death unknown) was a Mexican boxer. He competed in the men's featherweight event at the 1932 Summer Olympics.
