= Ossewabrandwag =

Pro-Nazi Germany organization in South Africa during WW2

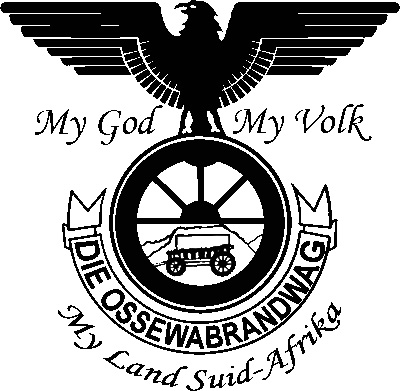
- Seal of the Ossewabrandwag
- Formation: 4 February 1939
- Dissolved: 1952
- Headquarters: Bloemfontein, Union of South Africa
- Members: 350,000 (1941)
- Leader: Johannes Van Rensburg

The Ossewabrandwag (OB) (Afrikaans pronunciation: [ˈɔsəˌvɑːˌbrantvaχ], from Afrikaans: ossewa, lit. 'ox-wagon' and Afrikaans: brandwag, lit. 'guard, picket, sentinel, sentry' - Ox-wagon Sentinel) was an Afrikaner nationalist organization, founded in South Africa in Bloemfontein on 4 February 1939. It was strongly opposed to South African participation in World War II, had hostile views toward the United Kingdom, and was sympathetic to Nazi Germany. In late 1940, the Ossewabrandwag plotted a pro-German insurrection against Prime Minister Jan Smuts, but the plan was aborted.

The OB carried out a campaign of sabotage against state infrastructure, resulting in a government crackdown. The unpopularity of that crackdown has been proposed as a contributing factor to the victory of the National Party in the 1948 South African general election and the rise of apartheid.

== Background ==
During the Napoleonic Era, what had previously been the Dutch Cape Colony was seized by the Royal Navy to prevent it from falling under French hegemony. After Napoleon I was finally defeated in 1815, the British Empire refused to cede control over the colony back to the Netherlands. Much of Cape Colony's large population of Dutch settlers resented living under British rule, especially those on the Cape's frontier, known as the "Boers". Compounded disdain over British rule triggering the mass migration of Boers in 1835 from the colony into the African interior in an event that became known as the Great Trek. The emancipation of enslaved people in the British Empire in 1834, with full emancipation granted in 1838, was an important contributing factor. The Boer migrants eventually established the Orange Free State and South African Republic. In 1881, the independence of these states was confirmed following their victory over the British Empire in the brief First Boer War. Following the discovery of massive gold and mineral deposits in Boer territory, war broke out again in 1899. By 1902, Great Britain conquered both Boer Republics, overcoming stubborn Boer resistance through the use of a scorched earth policy and forcing Boer civilians into concentration camps. The vast majority of Boers who were interned in the camps were women and children, and between 18,000 and 26,000 Boers perished in these concentration camps due to diseases.

After the war, a degree of reconciliation developed between the Afrikaners and British, facilitating the formation of the Union of South Africa in 1910, under the leadership of former Boer Commando leaders such as Louis Botha and Jan Smuts. South African Union Defence Force troops, including thousands of Afrikaners, served in the British forces during World War I.

Nonetheless, many Boers remembered the brutal tactics used by Britain in the Second Boer War and remained resentful of British rule, even in the looser form of Dominion status.

== 1930s ==
The chief vehicle of Afrikaner nationalism at this time was the "Purified National Party" of D. F. Malan, which broke away from the National Party when the latter merged with Smuts' South African Party in 1934. Another important element was the Afrikaner Broederbond, a quasi-secret society founded in 1918, and dedicated to the proposition that "the Afrikaner volk has been planted in this country by the Hand of God..."

The Ossewabrandwag was officially established in 1938 to commemorate the centennial of the Great Trek. Most of the migrants travelled in ox-drawn wagons, hence the group's name. The group's leader was Johannes Van Rensburg, an attorney who had previously served as Secretary of Justice under Jan Smuts and supported the Nazi government in Germany.

== During World War II ==
The Boer militants of the Ossebrandwag (OB) were hostile to the United Kingdom and sympathetic to the ideology of Nazi Germany. Thus the OB opposed South African participation in World War II, even after the Union declared war in support of Britain in September 1939. By 1941, the OB had approximately 350,000 members.

Members of the OB refused to enlist in the UDF and sometimes harassed servicemen in uniform. This erupted into open rioting in Johannesburg on 1 February 1941; 140 soldiers were seriously hurt.

More dangerous was the formation of the Stormjaers (Storm hunters), a paramilitary wing of the OB. The nature of the Stormjaers was evidenced by the oath sworn by new recruits: "If I retreat, shoot me. If I fall, avenge me. If I charge, follow me" (Afrikaans: As ek omdraai, skiet my. As ek val, wreek my. As ek storm, volg my). This motto, originally attributed to French Royalist Henri de la Rochejaquelein in 1793, also became a popular slogan of Benito Mussolini's Fascists in the 1930s.

In August 1940, the OB informed the Abwehr that they were willing to launch a rebellion against Jan Smuts. The organization said they had 160,000 members and 15,000 soldiers, who had not taken the "Africa oath" of willingness to fight against the Axis anywhere on the continent, ready to strike. They proposed that the Germans drop off weapons in Southern Rhodesia or in South West Africa. The "West Plan" was far more well-planned.

"At an hour to be determined by the German High Command, Afrikaners would then blow up all rail and road bridges connecting the Transvaal with Natal. The railway personnel, the Police and 26,000 mine workers and employees have been penetrated as the rest of the State services with Ossewabrandwag members and would go on strike. The latter, viz. mine workers and employees, are already today urging for a strike. English newspapers are going to be blown up. Smuts and his followers are going to be asked kill themselves. Further dispositions are left to the German General Staff, particularly whether and which bridges are to be blown up."

The plan was never carried out, as the OB failed to obtain sufficient weapons. Furthermore, the OB was reluctant to take up arms after Malan distanced the National Party from the organization at the end of 1941. Nevertheless, individual members continued to carry out acts of sabotage against the Union government. The Stormjaers dynamited electrical power lines and railways and cut telegraph and telephone lines. Most Afrikaners found these types of acts excessive, and Malan ordered the National Party to break with the OB entirely in 1942.

The Union government cracked down on the OB and the Stormjaers, placing thousands of them in internment camps for the duration of the war. Even so, many of the internees, including future prime minister John Vorster, became future leaders of the ruling National Party (NP) during the apartheid era. Moreover, the internment aroused Afrikaner opposition to the government and helped the NP win the 1948 general election.

At the end of the war, the OB merged into the National Party and ceased to exist as a separate body.

== Ideology ==
A Nazi spy in South Africa who had frequent contact with Van Rensburg in 1944 stated that the OB was "based on the Führer-principle, fighting against the Empire, the capitalists, the communists, the Jews, the party and the system of parliamentarism... on the base of national-socialism". (Note: Author of this message named "Felix", i. e. Lothar Sittig, a German agent, who was based inside the South African Union and had frequent contact with Dr J. F. Johannes Van Rensburg, the Ossewabrandwag leader. pp. 7f.. See Unesco, 1980 p. 17 "O. B. im Jahreswechsel", i.e. Ossewabrandwag in the turn of the year. Print in French: A. Kum'a N'Dumbe, Hitler voulait l'Afrique, l'Harmattan, Paris 1980 ISBN 978-2-85802-140-6 pp. 371f; in German: IKO Verlag, Frankfurt 1993. – From: Auswärtiges Amt (Foreign Office) Bonn, Archives StS Afrika (i.e.: Staatssekretär) 1939 – 1943, f. 24, 1102-S9) Many political science authors concurred that the OB's association with national socialism ranged from an "inclination", to "wholehearted acceptance" One author, Pierre L. van den Berghe, contended that, while there were parallels, neither Van Rensburg nor the OB were genuine fascists.

== See also ==
- Robey Leibbrandt
- Greyshirts (South African Gentile National Socialist Movement)
