= Lucien Laplace =

French boxer

Personal information
- Nationality: French
- Born: 29 December 1905; St. Erme, France
- Died: 10 March 1960 (aged 54)

Sport
- Sport: Boxing

Lucien Laplace (29 December 1905 – 10 March 1960) was a French boxer. He competed in the men's welterweight event at the 1932 Summer Olympics.
