= Carl Jensen (boxer) =

Danish boxer

Carl Jensen (December 19, 1909 – March 18, 1991) was a Danish boxer who competed in the 1932 Summer Olympics. He was born in Aarhus and died in Gentofte.

In 1932 he was eliminated in the quarter-finals of the welterweight class after losing his fight to the upcoming silver medalist Erich Campe.
