= Dave McCleave =

English boxer

Personal information
- Nationality: British (English)
- Born: 24 December 1911 Battersea, London, England
- Died: 19 May 1988 (aged 76)

Sport
- Sport: Boxing
- Club: Lynn BC
Medal record
Men's Boxing
Representing England
British Empire Games
Gold medal – first place	1934 London	Welterweight

David Edward McCleave (24 December 1911 – 19 May 1988) was an English boxer who competed for Great Britain in the 1932 Summer Olympics.

== Boxing career ==
McCleave born in Battersea, boxed out of Lynn BC.

In 1932 he finished fourth in the welterweight class. He was not able to compete in the bronze medal bout against Bruno Ahlberg. At the 1934 Empire Games he won the gold medal in the welterweight class after winning the final against Dick Barton.

He won the 1932 and 1934 Amateur Boxing Association British welterweight titles and the 1931 lightweight title, when boxing out of the Lynn ABC.

== Personal life ==
In the 1950s he was the landlord of the Union Tavern Pub Camberwell New Road. It was a boxing pub where David Benjamin Gray was compere and manager with his wife Irene Alice Gray.
