= Nils Althin =

Swedish boxer (1905–1978)

Personal information
- Nationality: Swedish
- Born: 12 May 1905; Malmö, Sweden
- Died: 19 May 1978 (aged 73); Los Angeles, California, United States

Sport
- Sport: Boxing

Nils Althin (12 May 1905 – 19 May 1978) was a Swedish boxer. He competed in the men's welterweight event at the 1932 Summer Olympics.
