= Edward Flynn (boxer) =

American boxer (1909–1976)

Personal information
- Born: Edward Loring Flynn; October 25, 1909 New Orleans, Louisiana, U.S
- Died: February 7, 1976 (aged 66) Tampa, Florida, U.S.
Medal record
Men's boxing
Representing the United States
Olympic Games
Gold medal – first place	1932 Los Angeles	Welterweight

Edward Loring Flynn (October 25, 1909 – February 7, 1976) was an American boxer who won the gold medal in the 1932 Summer Olympics as a welterweight. He was also a member of the Loyola Wolf Pack boxing team.

He was born in New Orleans and died in Tampa, Florida.

== Amateur career ==
Flynn was the U.S. amateur champion in both 1931 and 1932. In 1932, he won the gold medal in the welterweight class after winning the final against Erich Campe.

== Post-Olympics ==
After his gold medal in Los Angeles, he fought professionally, compiling a record of 14–1. Flynn was drafted into the armed services in 1935, remaining in uniform until the end of World War II. He graduated from Loyola's dental school and is listed as "Dr. Eddie Flynn" as a member of the Greater New Orleans Sports Hall of Fame.

== 1932 Olympic results ==
Below are the boxing results of Edward Flynn who represented the United States in the welterweight division at the 1932 Los Angeles Olympics:

- Round of 16: defeated Luis Sardella (Argentina) on points
- Quarterfinal: defeated Dick Barton (South Africa) on points
- Semifinal: defeated Dave McCleave (Great Britain) on points
- Final: defeated Erich Campe (Germany) on points (won gold medal)
