= Carmen Barth =

American boxer (1912–1985)

Olympic medal record

Men's boxing

Representing the United States
Gold medal – first place	1932 Los Angeles	Middleweight

Carmine R. DiBartholomeo, better known as Carmen Barth (September 13, 1912 – September 17, 1985), was a male American boxer who competed in the 1932 Summer Olympics. He was born and raised in the Collinwood neighborhood of Cleveland, Ohio and died in Lorain, Ohio.

== Amateur career ==
In 1931 Barth won 160 Lb Amateur Title of Cleveland. In 1932 he won the gold medal in the middleweight class after winning the final against Amado Azar.

=== 1932 Olympic Results ===
Below are the results of Carmen Barth, an American middleweight boxer who competed at the 1932 Los Angeles Olympics:

- Round of 16: bye
- Quarterfinal: defeated Manuel Cruz (Mexico) second-round knockout
- Semifinal: defeated Ernest Peirce (South Africa) by decision
- Final: defeated Amado Azar (Argentina) by decision (won gold medal)
