= Christian Nissen =

German sailor (1893 – after 1955)

- Born: 1893
- Died: Unknown
- Military career
- Allegiance: Nazi Germany
- Conflicts: Second World War

Christian Nissen aka Hein Mück (1893 – after 1955) was a German sailor and yachtsman, who served with Nazi Germany's Abwehr and its special forces, the Brandenburgers in World War II.

== Biography ==
Nissen was a very experienced sailor, who had sailed around Cape Horn several times and belonged to the international guild of Cape Horniers. As an experienced yachtsman too he got in the focus of Germany's Abwehr. The ghost sailors were an asset of Abwehr chief Admiral Wilhelm Canaris. Experienced yachtsmen trained by his special forces, the Brandenburgers, sailed the northern and southern Atlantic in World War II.

=== Operation Lobster I ===
In June 1940 Nissen had been called to the Sabotage School at Brandenburg an der Havel to prepare for Operation Lobster I and asked to find a boat suitable for transporting three agents to Ireland. Nissen had served in World War I aboard the Imperial German Navy full-rigged ship Melpomene. Melpomene had been captured by the Royal Navy 100 miles (160 km) west of the port of Queenstown, now Cobh, in County Cork. He was interned first at Templemore in County Tipperary, then in Oldcastle, County Meath, and finally on the Isle of Man. Therefore, Nissen was familiar with this area. He selected the "Soizic", a luxurious 36-foot (11 m) yacht from the harbour in Brest Bay for the voyage. The boat was fitted out like a French fishing vessel and had previously belonged to the French military attaché in Bern. The mission was successful, but the agents were arrested in Ireland two hours after getting ashore.

=== Operation Seagull ===
Operation Lobster was followed by Operation Seagull (Ireland) in late summer 1940. Nissen's orders were to transport an NCO from the Brandenburgers, Helmut Clissmann, and one Abwehr I radio operator to the southern coast of Ireland to carry out their mission. The vessel chosen was the "Anni Braz-Bihen" a Malamok type sailing boat, register no. 'Douarnenez 3384' belonging to Henri Helias. The vessel was returned to French owners in 1945. Clissmann was stationed at Westende, Belgium in readiness for the operation. Nissen received his orders from his direct superior in the Regiment, Captain Hollman. The mission failed.

=== Operation Hawthorne ===
Operation Hawthorn, in German "Operation Weissdorn" was a piece of outstanding yachtmanship in those days. "Leutnant zur See" (or "Ensign"), Christian Nissen, also known as Hein Mück a traditional popular figure in Bremen, brought, together with Arndt Georg "Age" Nissen, Paul Temme and three other "Ghost sailors" (German: Geistersegler), the South African boxer Robey Leibbrandt with a confiscated French sailboat, Kyloe from St. Malo, France, down to South Africa and dropped him with a rubber dinghy at the coast northwest of Cape Town. Klyoe had a crew of six, including Heinrich Garbers, who later on became such a commander too. They performed a non-stop voyage of 14,400 nautical miles (26,700 km), which ended in Spanish Sahara, from where they took the plane to Rome and further on home to Berlin.
