= Tony Mancini =

Canadian boxer (1913–1990)

Personal information
- Nationality: Canadian
- Born: 17 January 1913
- Died: 19 August 1990 (aged 77)

Sport
- Sport: Boxing

Anthony Mancini (17 January 1913 – 19 August 1990) was a Canadian boxer. He competed in the men's welterweight event at the 1932 Summer Olympics.
