= Leslie Harley =

Australian boxer

Medal record

Men's Boxing

British Empire Games
Bronze medal – third place	1938 Sydney	Heavyweight

Leslie Thomas Harley (26 October 1912 – 18 December 1987) was an Australian boxer who competed in the 1936 Summer Olympics.

Harley was the Australian Amateur Lightweight Champion in 1928 & 1929, the Australian Amateur Middleweight Champion in 1932 and the Australian Amateur Heavyweight Champion in 1933, 1935 and 1937. In 1936 he was eliminated in the second round of the light heavyweight class after losing his fight to František Havelka. At the 1938 Empire Games he won the bronze medal in the heavyweight class. Winner of various state titles in wrestling, swimming and diving, Harley also represented Victoria in water polo and soccer. As an Australian rules footballer, Harley played for Brunswick in the Victorian Football Association (VFA). He trained with VFL clubs Carlton and North Melbourne.

Harley, who joined the Victorian Police Force in 1935, retired from boxing in 1939 after winning 93 out of 100 bouts. He was the Victoria Police Boxing Champion from 1937 to 1940. He retired from the police force as the Physical Training Director in 1976.

== 1936 Olympic results ==
- Round of 32: defeated Walter Van Bueren (Switzerland) by decision
- Round of 16: lost to Frantisek Havelka (Czechoslovakia) by decision
