= Red Burman =

American boxer (James Clarence Burman; 1915–1996)

James Clarence 'Red' Burman (born James Clarence Burman, March 18, 1915 – January 25, 1996) was an American boxer in the Light Heavyweight and Heavyweight divisions. During the 1940s, he was a top rated contender who challenged Joe Louis for the world Heavyweight title.

== Early life ==
Clarence Burman was born in Baltimore, Maryland. He lived there his entire life. He changed his ring name to Red Burman in 1936.

== Boxing career ==
Red Burman fought under the names "K.O. Burns" or "Kayo Burns" and under his real name of James Burman until sometime in 1936. Entering that year, Burman had engaged in 44 professional bouts, sporting a record of 32 wins, 11 losses and 1 draw (tie), 7 wins by knockout. Burman was a protégé of former world Heavyweight Champion Jack Dempsey. On April 28, 1930, he made his professional boxing debut, losing to Mickey Nielson by a 4-round decision at the 104th regiment Armory, Baltimore.

Burman had his first victory on May 9, 1930, when he beat Young Nelson by a decision in four at the Arena, Salisbury, Maryland. On January 2, 1934, he faced Ken Overlin, who outpointed him over 8 rounds at Portner's Arena, Alexandria, Virginia.

After losing to Bob Turner by a third-round knockout on October 29, 1934 in Newport News, Virginia, Burman tallied off 12 wins in a row, including avenging the loss to Turner by an eighth-round knockout on February 4, 1935, at Carlin's Park in Baltimore. Burman fought at Oriole Park, Yankee Stadium and Comiskey Park during this period. He beat Billy Ketchel and Steve Dudas, among others, during that streak.

Burman lost to Dudas in a rematch, then followed up with 14 more victories in a row. Included among his victims were Ketchel two more times, the dangerous Buddy Knox (29-2 coming into their fight) and Dutch Weimer. On October 2, 1936, he faced fellow Louis title challenger John Henry Lewis, losing to the future world Light Heavyweight Champion by a 2nd-round knockout at the Chicago Stadium in Chicago, Illinois.

Burman then faced Eduardo Primo, beating him by a knockout in 3 rounds. On April 21, 1937, Burman upset until then undefeated Gus Dorazio by a ten-round decision at the Naval Armory in Detroit, Michigan. He then defeated 17-2 Eddie Blunt but lost to 14-1 Alberto Santiago Lovell at Gilmore Stadium in Los Angeles.

On February 2, 1938, Burman ascended to the Heavyweight top ten rankings by defeating Johnny Risko, another top contender of the era. In 1939, he split two fights with Welshman Tommy Farr, winning the first in New York and losing the second one in London (Burman had previously fought internationally, in Mexico). Both fights were decision wins for the victor.

A third fight with Steve Dudas took place on August 26, 1940 and Burman won by ten rounds decision at Baltimore. Then, on October 21, also at Baltimore, Burman faced Tony Musto. The winner would receive a title shot at Joe Louis. In what the Associated Press called "a savage 10-round scrap" Burman came out victorious by decision, in a bout in which both contestants bled.

== Fight with Joe Louis ==
Joe Louis was the world Heavyweight champion and 44-1 when he was challenged by Burman, 73-17-1, on January 31, 1941, at the Madison Square Garden in New York City. The referee for the bout, contested for the world Heavyweight title, was Frank Fullam. Burman gave Louis one of his strongest tests, but he was stopped at 2:49 of the fifth round by the defending champion, befallen by a Louis body blow.

== Later career ==
Burman continued boxing after the fight with Louis. His next fight was May 19, 1941 against Mike Alfano, and he won by sixth-round knockout. He later beat Al Hart (16-6 coming in) by second-round knockout, but lost to world Light-Heavyweight champions Melio Bettina and Joey Maxim, both by ten-round decisions. After losing by a ninth-round knockout to Tami Mauriello on July 23, 1942 at the Madison Square Garden, and on October 26 of the same year to Alfred Brown by a fifth-round knockout at Baltimore, Burman retired, with a record of 78 wins, 22 losses and 3 draws in 103 professional boxing bouts, 33 wins by way of knockout.

== Ring Magazine cover ==
Burman was featured on the cover of the April 1941 issue of Ring Magazine.

== Death ==
Red Burman died of Paget's disease at Baltimore on January 25, 1996.
