= Tom Griffin (boxer) =

British boxer

Thomas James Griffin (25 January 1913 – September 1984) was a British boxer who competed in the 1936 Summer Olympics.

In 1936 he was eliminated in the quarterfinals of the light heavyweight class after losing his fight to eventual bronze medalist Francisco Risiglione.
