= Hans Bernlöhr =

German boxer

Personal information
- Nationality: German
- Born: 18 July 1907; Stuttgart, Germany
- Died: 25 June 1991 (aged 83); Stuttgart, Germany

Sport
- Sport: Boxing

Hans Bernlöhr (18 July 1907 – 25 June 1991) was a German boxer. He competed in the men's middleweight event at the 1932 Summer Olympics.
