= Larry Flood =

Irish boxer

Personal information
- Nationality: Irish
- Born: 2 March 1912; Kildare, Ireland
- Died: 22 January 1999 (aged 86); Dublin, Ireland

Sport
- Sport: Boxing

Larry Flood (2 March 1912 – 22 January 1999) was an Irish boxer. He competed in the men's welterweight event at the 1932 Summer Olympics.
