= Peter Jørgensen =

Danish boxer (1907–1992)

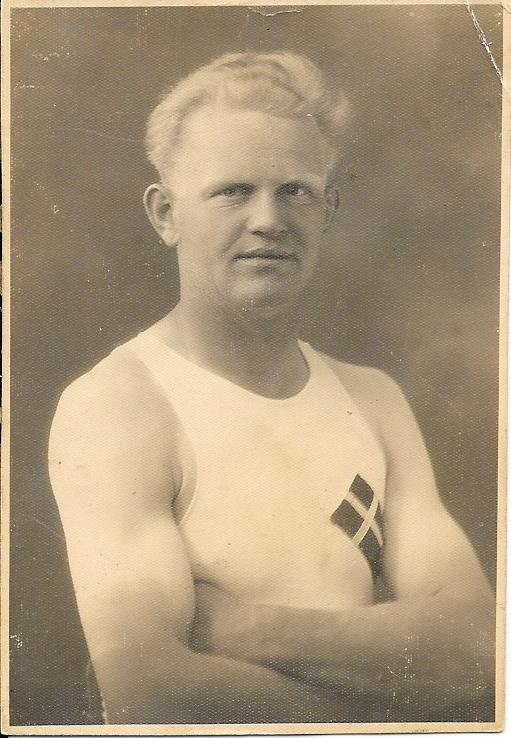

Personal information
- Born: 2 April 1907 Hillerød, Denmark
- Died: 27 August 1992 (aged 85)
Medal record
Men's Boxing
Representing Denmark
Olympic Games
| Bronze medal – third place | 1932 Los Angeles | light heavyweight |

Peter Oscar Jørgensen (2 April 1907 – 27 August 1992) was a Danish boxer who competed at the 1932 Summer Olympics.

Born in Hillerød, Hovedstaden he won the bronze medal in 1932 in the light heavyweight class after winning the third place fight against James Murphy in a walkover.
