= Gunnar Bärlund =

Finnish boxer (1911–1982)

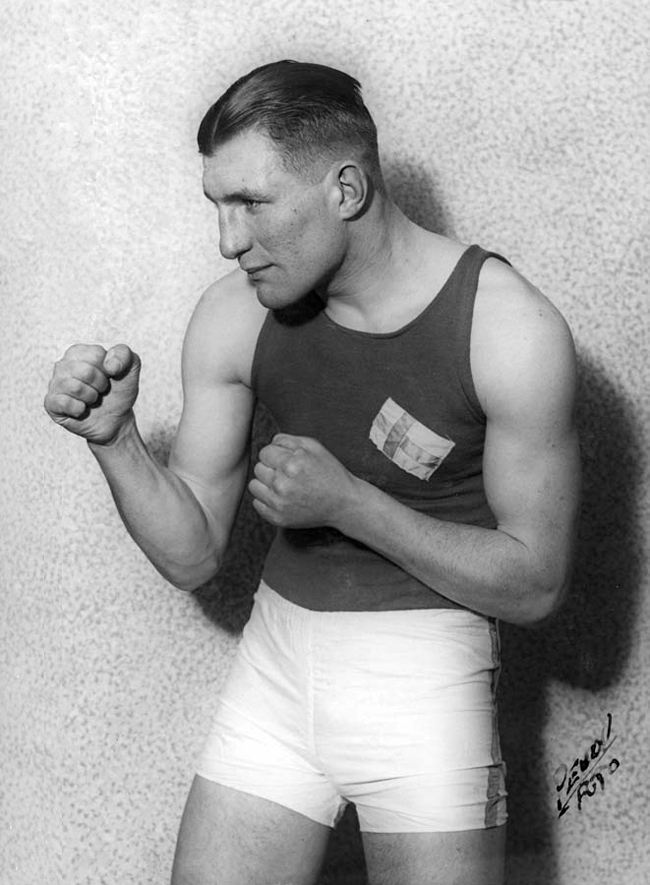

Personal information
- Nicknames: Guni, GeeBee
- Born: 9 January 1911 Helsinki, Finland
- Died: 2 August 1982 (aged 71) Palm Beach, Florida, United States
- Height: 1.87 m (6 ft 2 in)
- Weight: Heavyweight (80–92 kg)

Boxing career
- Stance: Orthodox

Boxing record
- Total fights: 87
- Wins: 56
- Win by KO: 28
- Losses: 30
- Draws: 1
Medal record
Representing Finland
European Championships
Gold medal – first place	1934 Budapest	+ 79.4 kg

Gunnar Richard Bernhard Bärlund (9 January 1911 – 2 August 1982) was a Finnish heavyweight boxer who won the European amateur title in 1934. He competed in the 1932 Summer Olympics, but lost in the first round to the eventual winner Santiago Lovell.

In 1934, Bärlund turned professional and in 1936 moved to the United States, where he fought until retiring from boxing in 1948. He eventually became an American citizen, and died in Palm Beach, Florida in 1982. In 1991, his statue was erected in Helsinki. His niece Tutu Sohlberg is a retired Olympic equestrian.
