= Hans Berger (boxer) =

German boxer

Personal information
- Nationality: German
- Born: 6 January 1906 Duisburg, German Empire
- Died: 21 December 1973 (aged 67) Siegen, West Germany

Sport
- Sport: Boxing

Hans Berger (6 January 1906 – 21 December 1973) was a German boxer. He competed in the men's light heavyweight event at the 1932 Summer Olympics.
