= South Africa at the 1932 Summer Olympics =

- IOC code: RSA (ZAF used at these Games)
- NOC: South African Olympic and Empire Games Association

in Los Angeles
- Competitors: 12 in 4 sports
- Flag bearer: Harry Hart
- Medals Ranked 15th: Gold 2 Silver 0 Bronze 3 Total 5

Summer Olympics appearances (overview)
- 1904; 1908; 1912; 1920; 1924; 1928; 1932; 1936; 1948; 1952; 1956; 1960; 1964–1988; 1992; 1996; 2000; 2004; 2008; 2012; 2016; 2020; 2024

The Union of South Africa competed at the 1932 Summer Olympics in Los Angeles, United States.

== Medalists ==
=== Gold ===
- Lawrence Stevens - Boxing Lightweight
- David Carstens - Boxing Light heavyweight

=== Bronze ===
- Ernest Peirce - Boxing Middleweight
- Marjorie Clark - Women's 80m Hurdles
- Jenny Maakal - Women's 400m Freestyle

== Athletics ==
=== Men ===
- Willie Walters
- Danie Joubert
- Harry Hart

=== Women ===
- Marjorie Clark - Bronze at Women's 80m Hurdles

== Boxing ==
5 Competitors, all men.

- Richard Barton - Eliminated in Quarter Final at Welterweight Class
- David Carstens - Gold at Light Heavyweight
- Ivan Duke - Eliminated at Quarterfinals Flyweight
- Ernest Peirce - Bronze at Middleweight
- Lawrence Stevens - Gold at Lightweight

== Sailing ==
- Cecil Goodricke - Snowbird #11
- Cecil Goodricke, Arent van Soelen - Star #7

== Swimming ==
Women

Athlete	Event	Heat		Semifinal		Final	
Athlete	Event	Time	Rank	Time	Rank	Time	Rank
Jenny Maakal	100 m freestyle	1:11.0	6 Q	1:10.6	7 Q	1:10.8	6
Jenny Maakal	400 m freestyle	5:53.9	5 Q	6:00.6	5 Q	5:47.3	3rd place, bronze medalist(s)
