= Johannes Van Rensburg =

South African lawyer and Afrikaner nationalist (1898-1966)

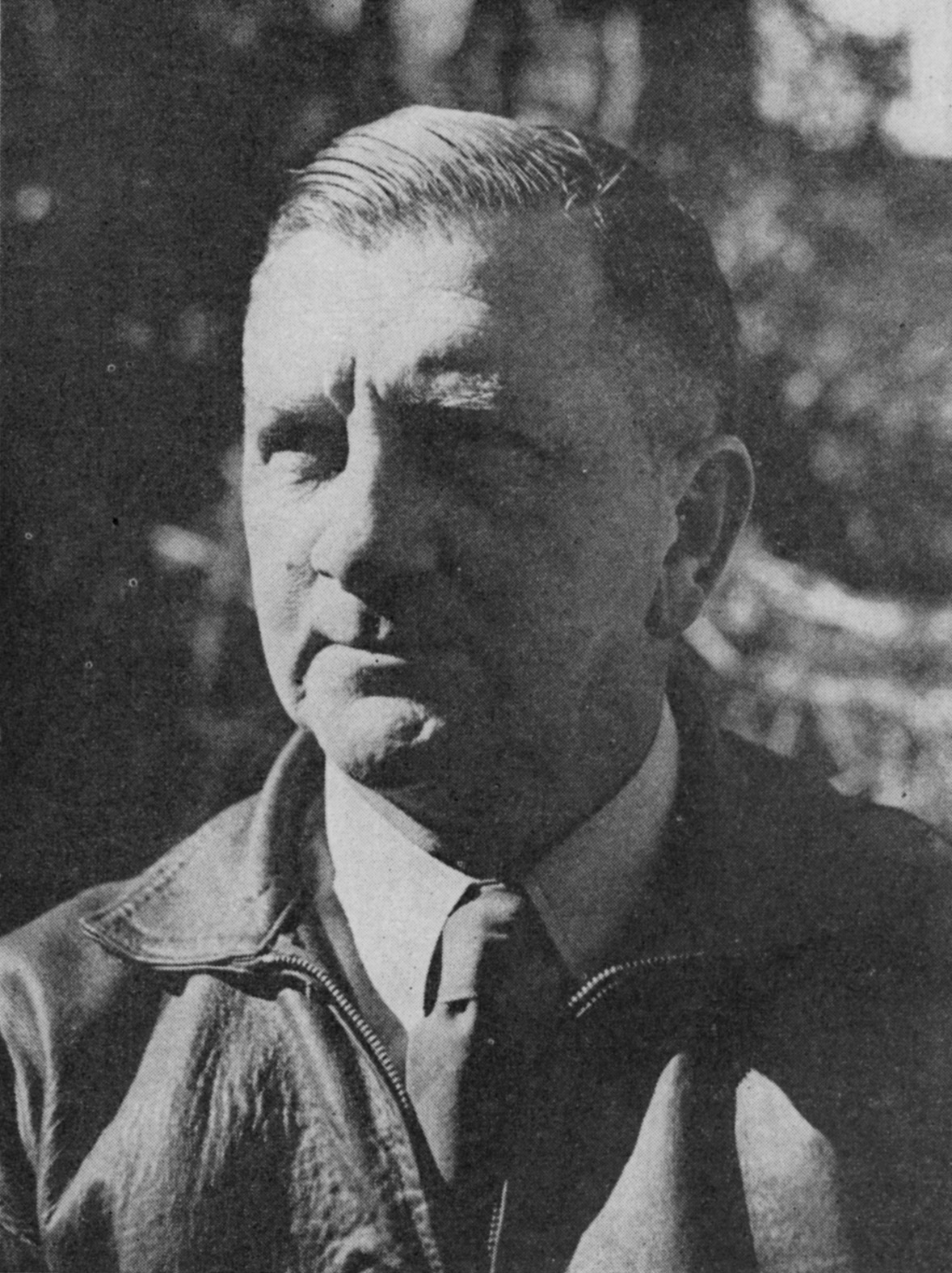
- Van Rensburg in 1955
- Born: Johannes Frederik Janse Van Rensburg; 24 September 1898; Winburg, Orange Free State (present-day South Africa)
- Died: 25 September 1966 (aged 68); Cape Town, South Africa
- Resting place: Pretoria, South Africa
- Other name: Hans van Rensburg
- Education: University of Pretoria
- Occupation: Lawyer
- Spouse: Catharina Johanna Joubert
- Children: 2
- Parent: JF van Rensburg

Johannes Frederik Janse Van Rensburg (known as Hans) (24 September 1898 – 25 September 1966) was a South African lawyer, and leader of the Ossewabrandwag.

He was born in Winburg and died in Cape Town, a descendant of the Loyalist Johannes Frederik Janse Van Rensburg. He received his MA in German from the University of Stellenbosch, and his bachelor's and doctorates in law from University of Pretoria.

Van Rensburg qualified as a solicitor and was hired as the personal secretary of Tielman Roos, the Minister of Justice. In 1933, he became Secretary of Justice (under Smuts as Minister). As Secretary, he traveled overseas. In Germany, he met Adolf Hitler, Hermann Göring, and other top Nazi officials. He was greatly impressed by Hitler's leadership and the discipline he observed in Germany.

In 1938, Van Rensburg helped organize the Ossewabrandwag as a vehicle for Afrikaner nationalism though often at odds with the National Party, which was the main driver of Afrikaner Nationalism at the time. Van Rensburg was the commander general of the Ossewabrandwag from 1941 until 1952. Like most members of the Ossewabrandwag, he was regarded as a German sympathizer during World War II. In August 1940, the Ossewabrandwag informed the Abwehr that they were willing to launch an uprising against Jan Smuts. The organization said they had 160,000 members and 15,000 soldiers, who had not taken the "Africa oath" of willingness to fight against the Axis anywhere on the continent, ready to strike. There is also evidence that Van Rensburg was the mastermind of German espionage operations in South Africa, and a treason case was built against him. However, the case was terminated after the National Party victory in 1948.

Van Rensburg died on 25 September 1966 in Cape Town, and was buried with military honors.
