= Luciano Fabbroni =

Italian boxer

Personal information
- Nationality: Italian
- Born: 13 December 1911; Grosseto, Italy
- Died: 24 August 2000 (aged 88); Grosseto, Italy

Sport
- Sport: Boxing

Luciano Fabbroni (13 December 1911 – 24 August 2000) was an Italian boxer. He competed in the men's welterweight event at the 1932 Summer Olympics.
