= Ernest Smith (boxer) =

Irish boxer

Personal information
- Nationality: Irish
- Born: 1912; Dublin, Ireland
- Died: 30 January 1962 (aged 49–50)

Sport
- Sport: Boxing

Ernest Smith (1912 – 30 January 1962) was an Irish boxer. He attended Saint Columba's National School by North Strand Church. He competed in the men's featherweight event at the 1932 Summer Olympics.
