= František Havelka =

Czechoslovak boxer

František Havelka (8 July 1908 – 21 March 1973) was a Czech boxer who competed in the 1936 Summer Olympics for Czechoslovakia. In 1936, he was eliminated in the quarter-finals of the light heavyweight class after losing his fight to Robey Leibbrandt of South Africa.
