= Børge Holm =

Dutch boxer

Personal information
- Born: 7 December 1910; Copenhagen, Denmark
- Died: 12 April 1971; Copenhagen, Denmark

Sport
- Sport: Boxing
- Event: 1936 Summer Olympics

Børge Søren Jørgensen Holm (7 December 1910 – 12 April 1971) was a Danish boxer who competed in the 1936 Summer Olympics.

He was born and died in Copenhagen.

In 1936 he was eliminated in the quarter-finals of the light heavyweight class after losing his fight to the upcoming gold medalist Roger Michelot.
