= John Keller (boxer) =

Canadian boxer

Personal information
- Nationality: Canadian
- Born: 18 February 1910; Poland
- Died: 5 July 1980 (aged 70); Maple Ridge, British Columbia, Canada

Sport
- Sport: Boxing

John Keller (18 February 1910 – 5 July 1980) was a Canadian boxer. He competed in the men's featherweight event at the 1932 Summer Olympics.
