= Dick Barton (boxer) =

South African boxer

Medal record

Men's Boxing

Representing South Africa

British Empire Games
| Silver medal – second place | 1934 London | Welterweight |

Richard Walter Barton (22 November 1911 – 29 June 1990) was a South African boxer who competed in the 1932 Summer Olympics.

He was born in Germiston and died in Johannesburg.

In 1932 he was eliminated in the quarter-finals of the welterweight class after losing his bout to the upcoming gold medalist Edward Flynn.

At the 1934 Empire Games he won the silver medal in the welterweight class after losing the final to Dave McCleave.
