= Aikoku (motorbike) =

Aikoku ("patriotism" in English) were motorcycles which were manufactured by Tetsui Makita in Japan in the mid-1930s, featuring 50cc side valve engines by JAC and HMS, and Meguro gearboxes.
