= Manuel Cruz (boxer) =

Mexican boxer

Personal information
- Nationality: Mexican

Sport
- Sport: Boxing

Manuel Cruz was a Mexican boxer. He competed in the men's middleweight event at the 1932 Summer Olympics. At the 1932 Summer Olympics, he lost to Carmen Barth of the United States.
