= Frederick Feary =

American boxer

Personal information
- Born: 10 April 1912
Medal record
Men's Boxing
Representing the United States
Olympic Games
Bronze medal – third place	1932 Los Angeles	Heavyweight

Frederick ("Fred") Feary (April 10, 1912 – April 20, 1994) was an American boxer who competed in the 1932 Summer Olympics.

Born in Stockton, California Feary was the United States amateur heavyweight champion in 1932. At the 1932 Los Angeles Olympics, Feary won the bronze medal in the heavyweight class after winning the third-place fight against George Maughan by walkover. Only six boxers competed in the heavyweight division.

== 1932 Olympic results ==
Below are the results of Frederick Feary, an American boxer who competed in the heavyweight division at the 1932 Los Angeles Olympics:

- Quarterfinal: bye
- Semifinal: lost to Luigi Rovati (Italy) on points
- Bronze Medal Bout: defeated George Maughan (Canada) by walkover (was awarded bronze medal)
