= Aikoku Hirabayashi =

Japanese boxer

Personal information
- Nationality: Japanese
- Born: 24 March 1909

Sport
- Sport: Boxing

Aikoku Hirabayashi (平林 愛国, Hirabayashi Aikoku, born 24 March 1909, date of death unknown) was a Japanese boxer. He competed in the men's welterweight event at the 1932 Summer Olympics. In his first fight of the tournament, he lost to Erich Campe of Germany.
