= Hans Georg Berger =

German-born photographer and writer

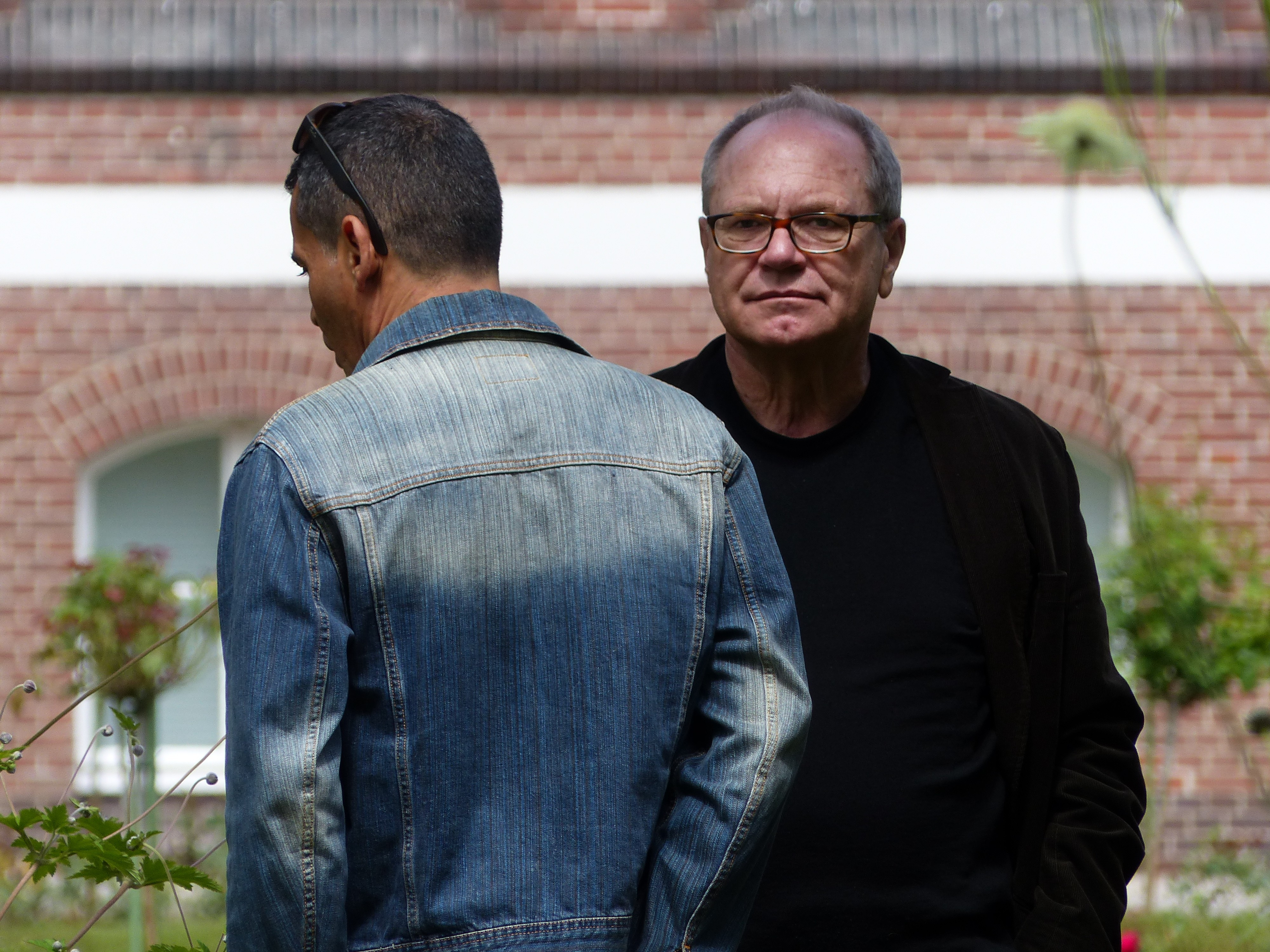
Hans Georg Berger, Berlin 2019

Hans Georg Berger is a German-born photographer and writer, who lives in Berlin, Elba and in Laos.

== Biography ==
Born in 1951 in Trier, Germany, he collaborated in the 1970s with the artist Joseph Beuys(1921-1986), who was a key influence on his concept of photography, and thereafter with the French writer and photographer Hervé Guibert (1955–91). Hans Georg Berger is a conceptual artist who uses the medium of photography. He conceives long-term-projects where he profoundly enters foreign cultures and religions. Major work of such photographic explorations deal with Theravada Buddhism in Burma, Cambodia, Laos and Thailand. He also developed a long-term study on Shiism in Iran, and work on aspects of Catholicism and Taoism. In his encounters, Berger introduces himself as the learning part and invites the participants to share their knowledge and social experiences. He opens a working process where people invited by him become true protagonists of the art process, creating a relation where reciprocal trust becomes the basis of joint efforts. To he Buddhist monks of Luang Prabang, for example, he presented, again and again, the resulting photographs and put their critique, their opinion and attitude at the basis of ongoing work. In an unusually close collaboration that lasted from 1978 to 1991, he created in a unique dialogue of images a vast body of photographic portraits of Herve Guibert, published in France in 2019 under the title "Un amour photographique" (Editions Le Quai et Michel de Maule; English and German editions).

Parallel to his art work, Hans Georg Berger is at the origin of several projects where science, the arts and social engagement meet. At a very young age, he was co-founder of an avant-garde theatre group in Germany, “Kollektiv Rote Rübe”, working as a writer and actor. He directed from 1979 to 1984 the Munich “Theaterfestival” and launched, together with composer Hans Werner Henze, the Festival of Contemporary Opera “Muenchener Biennale” in 1986. On the island of Elba (Italy), he created a Botanical Garden, the “Orto dei Semplici Elbano” for the study and conservation of rare and endemic plants of the Tuscan Arcipelago. This garden, founded in 1994 with botanists Gabriella Corsi and Fabio Garbari, is now part of the National Park of the Tuscan Arcipelago. It is situated next to an ancient Franciscan Hermitage, the “Eremo di Santa Caterina” that Berger discovered in 1977 as a ruin, and that has since become a creative meeting place for artists, writers and scientists, initiating various projects of literature, contemporary music, archaeology and botany. As part of his project of photography in the town of Luang Prabang, in Northern Laos, begun in 1993, he founded in 2006 the “Buddhist Archive of Photography” in collaboration with the city's Buddhist monks. At this archive, he directed two Major Research projects of the British Library's “Endangered Archives Programme”, digitizing and preserving 35.000 historical Buddhist photographs which in 2017 have been named for inscription to Unesco's list “Memory of the World”. Also in Luang Prabang, Berger is involved in the creation of a Buddhist School of Applied Arts sustained by the “Buddhist Heritage Project” that he co-founded in 2014 with one of the leading monks of Laos, Abbot Pha Khamchan Virachitta Maha Thela. In the 1980s, he helped to set up AIDA, an international human rights watch group for artists.

For a retrospective of his photographs at the "Museo delle Culture/MUSEC" in Lugano/Switzerland in 2021, Bergers work has been characterized in the following way: "Hans Georg Bergers whole output stems from the deliberate choice of photography as an existential remedy, as a tool that has proven over time to be very solid in embodying the artists identity and sensory and oneiric universe. Photography that is born out of the intimate dialogue with the Self and with what is loved, and that over the course of half a century has succeeded in extending itself to a cosmopolitan and universal dimension, carrying out an extraordinary, even unique journey within this great contemporary art." (Francesco Paolo Campione)

== Publications ==
by Hans Georg Berger:

- Recent publications:
- "Discipline and Senses. Hans Georg Berger, Photographs 1972-2020", edited by Francesco Paolo Campione, Milano 2021 (ISBN 978-88-572-4664-2)
- "La disciplina dei sensi. Hans Georg Berger, Fotografie 1972-2020, a cura ddi Francesco Paolo Campione, Milano 2021 (ISBN 978-88-572-4663-5)
- "Un amour photographique", Paris 2019 (ISBN 978-2-87623-705-6)
- "Phantom Paradise. Herve Guibert, A Photographic Love", Chicago 2019, ISBN 978-1-932476-93-4)
- "Phantomparadies. Herve Guibert, Eine photographische Liebe", Berlin 2019, ISBN 978-3-86300-509-2)
- Other publications:
- Het Bun Dai Bun – Laos, Sacred Rituals of Luang Prabang, London 2000 ISBN 1-903391-02-4
- Ceremonies Sacrees de Luang Prabang, Paris 2001
- The Floating Buddha. The Revival of Vipassana Meditation in Laos, 4th edition, New York/Luang Prabang 2009 ISBN 978-0-9844483-1-9
- The Learning Photographer. Scholarly texts on Hans Georg Berger's art work in Laos and Iran, New York/Luang Prabang 2009 ISBN 978-0-9844483-0-2
- Guibert en Egypte, Berlin 2013
- My Sacred Laos, Chicago 2015 ISBN 978-1-932476-71-2
- Giardini dell'Eremo, New York/Rio nell'Elba, 2015 ISBN 978-1-941811-01-6
- Monks and the Camera, New York/Luang Prabang, 2016 ISBN 978-1-941811-03-0
- Bei genauerem Hinsehen. Fotografien, Berlin 2016
- with other authors:
- Hans Georg Berger and Herve Guibert, Bordeaux 1992: Dialogue d'Images ISBN 2-905810-90-4
- Hans Georg Berger and Herve Guibert, Arles 1992: Lettres d'Egypte ISBN 2-7427-0557-0
- Hans Georg Berger and Hugh Honour, Arles 1998: Carnets Khmers ISBN 2-7427-0707-7
- Hans Georg Berger and Khamvone Boulyaphone, Luang Prabang 2010: Treasures of the Buddhist Archive of Photography, Luang Prabang/Laos ISBN 978-09844483-3-3
- John Alan Farmer, New York 2010: The Self-In-Relation. On Hans Georg Berger's Photographs, ISBN 978-0-9844483-8-8
- Boris von Brauchitsch/Saeid Edalatnejad (ed), Heidelberg 2017: Einsicht. Drei Reisen in die innerste Welt des schiitischen Islam. Fotografien von Hans Georg Berger und frühen iranischen Fotografen, ISBN 978-3-86828-818-6
