= George Maughan =

Canadian boxer

George Burwell Maughan (May 8, 1910 – June 16, 2003) was a Canadian boxer who competed in the 1932 Summer Olympics. He was Canada's flagbearer.

He was born in Toronto, Ontario; he lived in Montreal, Quebec, and died in Guadalajara, Mexico.

In 1932 he finished fourth of the heavyweight class. He was not able to fight in the bronze medal bout against Frederick Feary.
