= Robey Leibbrandt =

South African boxer and spy (1913–1966)

Sidney Robey Leibbrandt (25 January 1913 – 1 August 1966) was a South African Olympian, who during World War II acted as an Abwehr agent for the Third Reich against the British Empire in South Africa. In 1943, he was convicted of high treason by a South African court and imprisoned for 5 years.

== Early life and sports career ==
Robey Leibbrandt
Medal record

Men's Boxing

Representing South Africa

British Empire Games
Bronze medal – third place	1934 London	Light Heavyweight

Leibbrandt was born on 25 January 1913 in Potchefstroom, in the Transvaal, the third of six children of Meyder (Meider) Johannes Leibbrandt. His father was of German descent, and his mother was Irish. Leibbrandt's father had fought with the Afrikaner forces in the Second Boer War, and was subsequently a Sergeant-Major in the South African Army, but in 1914 on the outbreak of World War I, he had objected to an order to invade German South-West Africa in a military campaign against the imperial German forces there, stating that it was his belief that "Germans should not war against Germans".

In the late 1920s, Robey Leibbrandt established himself as an accomplished pugilist. Leibbrandt represented South Africa at the 1934 Empire Games and won the light heavyweight bronze medal. He also represented South Africa at the Berlin Olympics in 1936, competing in the light heavyweight class. He was not able to fight the bronze medal bout with Francisco Risiglione and finished fourth. He became South African heavyweight champion on 31 July 1937 in Johannesburg, beating Jim Pentz.

== German military service ==
Following his stay in Nazi Germany for the 1936 Berlin Olympics, during which he had been deeply impressed with Adolf Hitler and Nazi Germany, Leibbrandt returned to Berlin in 1938 to study at the Reich Academy for Gymnastics, and remained when World War II began in 1939. He subsequently volunteered with the Wehrmacht, with which he became the first South African to be trained as a Fallschirmjäger, and a glider pilot. Leibbrand was subsequently seconded to the Brandenburgers sabotage training course for irregular warfare agents at Abwehr II (Abwehrschool "Quenzgut") near Brandenburg an der Havel, west of Berlin.

== Abwehr agent ==
After Leibbrandt had completed his irregular warfare training he was assigned by the Abwehr to take part in 'Operation Weissdorn' (Operation Hawthorn), a plan for a coup d'état against the Government of the Union of South Africa led by Prime Minister Jan Smuts, which had taken South Africa into the war as a part of the British Empire, as South Africa was a Dominion.

Leibbrandt left Germany on 5 April 1941 under the agent code-name Walter Kempf. In June 1941 after a sea voyage down the North and South Atlantic Oceans he was put ashore from an Abwehr operated captured French sail-boat called Kyloe, captained by Christian Nissen, on the Namaqualand coast north of Cape Town. Once back in South Africa, Leibbrandt made contact with what he hoped would be pro-Nazi elements among the Afrikaner populace known as the Ossewabrandwag, but its leader Johannes Van Rensburg was found to be unsympathetic to his mission.

== Insurgency campaign, capture, trial & imprisonment ==
Leibbrandt assembled a paramilitary force of less than 60 men from the Ossewabrandwag, recruited during a series of Hitlerite style speeches that he made in the Orange Free State and the Transvaal. Leibbrandt's group launched a series of small-scale guerrilla warfare operations against infrastructure targets, dynamiting power lines and railway tracks, and cutting telephone and telegraph cables. During an engagement with South African Army troops in late 1942, Leibbrandt was recognised, and consequently became a fugitive. He was captured in Pretoria in late December 1942 after a tip-off given to the authorities.

During his trial on charges of high treason, Leibbrandt refused to participate except to state that he had acted for "Volk & Fuhrer", and to give a Nazi salute to the court. On 11 March 1943, the court sentenced him to death. After hearing the sentence pronounced he shouted "I welcome death!", to the receipt of some cheering from a handful of supporters in the court's public gallery. To avoid making Leibbrandt a martyr and risk increasing pro-Nazi sympathies among the Afrikaners, the sentence was commuted to life imprisonment by Prime Minister Jan Smuts.

== Post-war ==
In 1948, Leibbrandt had his sentence quashed in a general amnesty enacted by the new National Party Government under the leadership of Daniel François Malan, a party that had opposed South Africa's involvement into World War II on the side of the British Empire, and had a policy of neutrality in the conflict. When Leibbrandt was released from prison he was met at its entrance by a small crowd of Afrikaners, who treated him as a "folk hero".

In the late 1940s, he returned briefly to professional boxing, winning a handful of fights.

On 15 November 1949 at Windhoek, aged 36, Leibbrandt married then 18-year-old Margaretha Cornelia Botha. They had three sons and two daughters. One of his sons was named "Izan" (Nazi spelled backwards).

Leibbrandt remained politically active in later life, founding the 'Anti-Communist Protection Front' in 1962, and producing a series of pamphlets entitled Wake up South Africa.

== Death ==
Leibbrandt died on 1 August 1966 at Ladybrand.

== In popular culture ==
Leibbrandt's recruitment and subsequent activities as an Abwehr agent in South Africa during the Second World War were portrayed in the 1990 South African feature film The Fourth Reich by Manie van Rensburg and starring Ryno Hattingh and Marius Weyers.

== See also ==
- Waffen-SS foreign volunteers and conscripts
- Germanophilia
