= Hans Georg Vaupel =

German sculptor (born 1934)

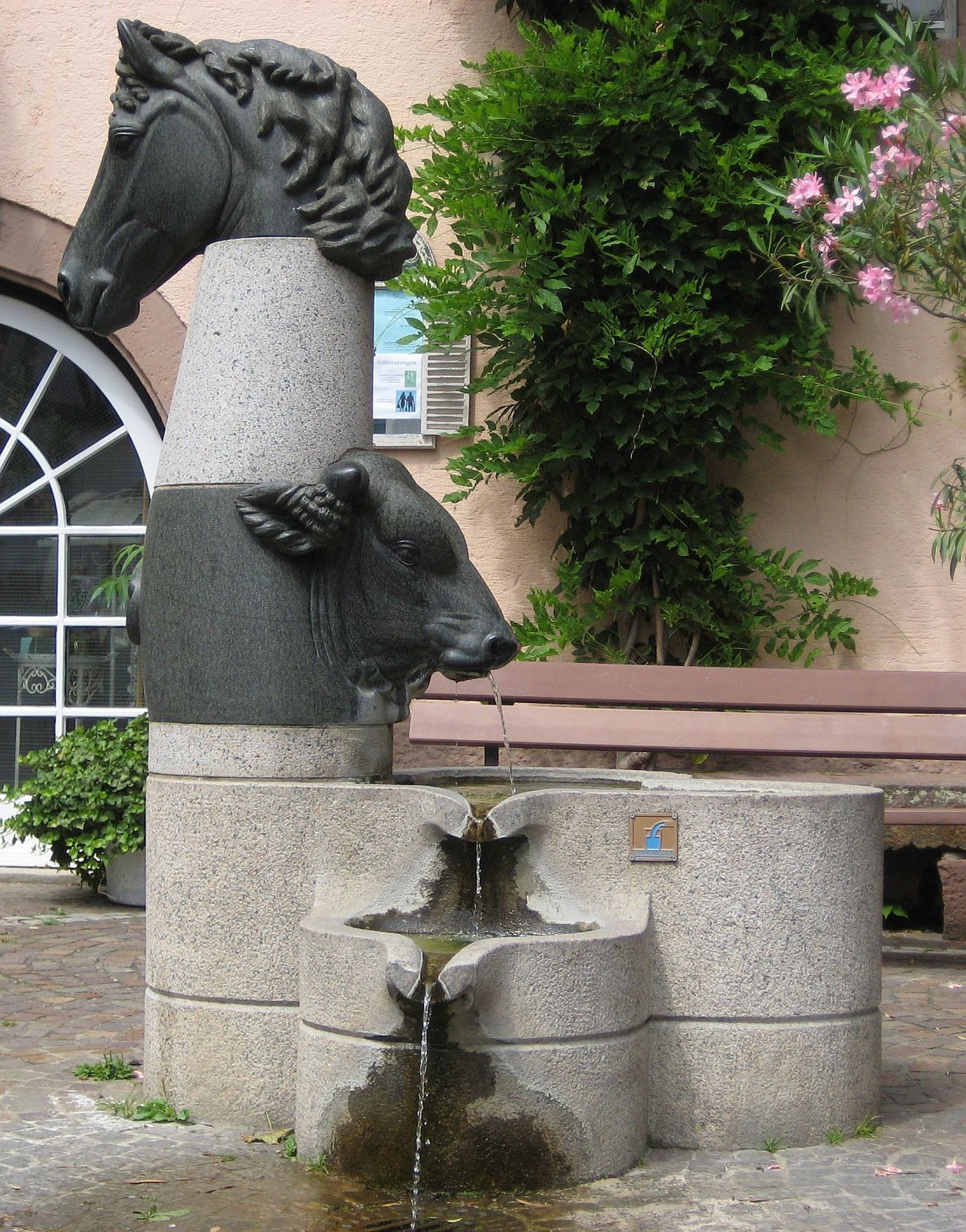
Rappenbrunnen in Karlsruhe Durlach

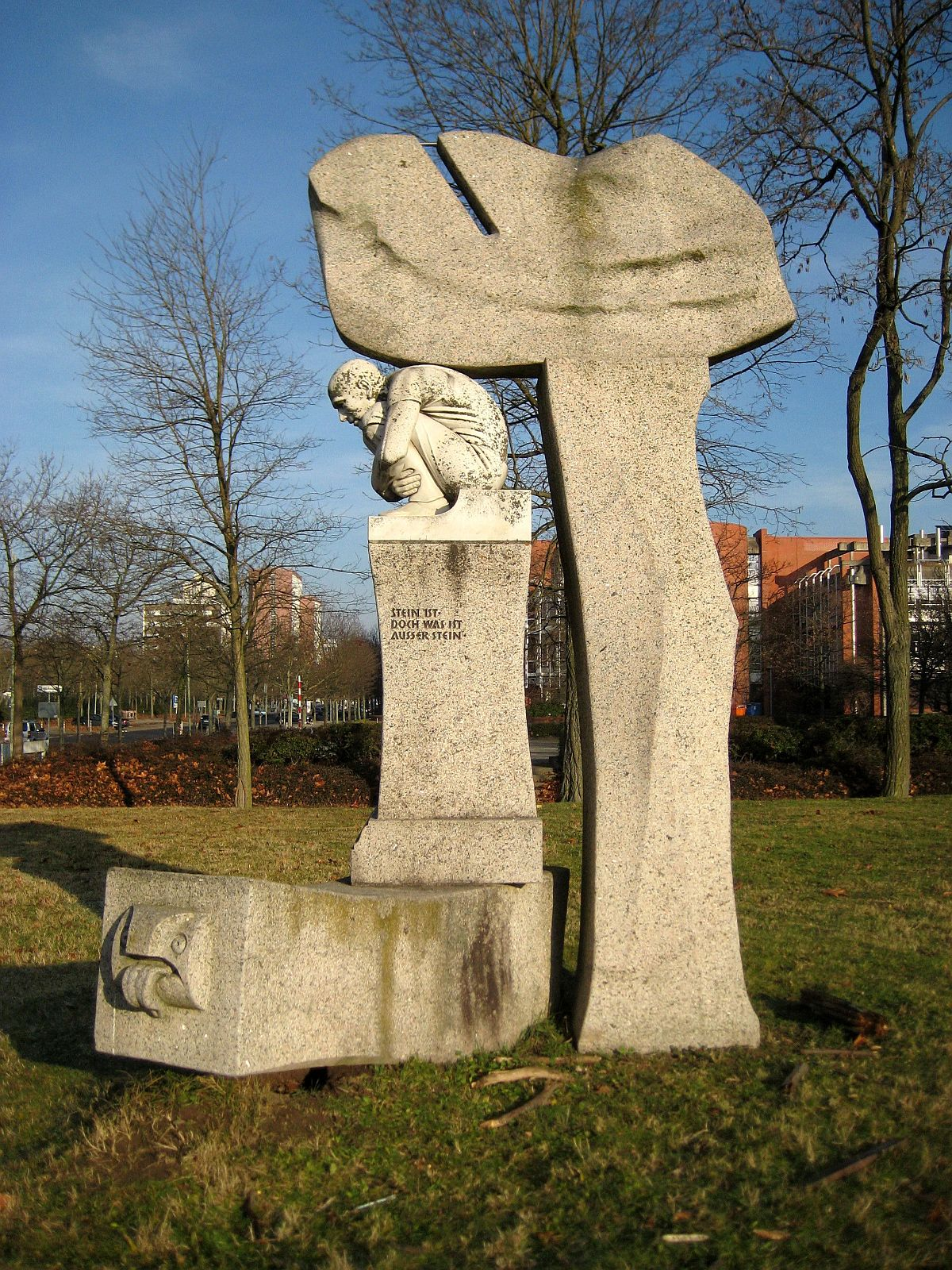
Sculpture at the Elisabeth Selbert School in Karlsruhe

Hans Georg Vaupel (11 September 1934 – 24 February 2024) was a German sculptor.

Vaupel was born in Bochum, Germany. He studied sculpture from 1952 to 1954 at the Folkwangschule in Essen, Germany. From 1954 and 1956 he went on a study trip to Greece and Italy. Afterwards he continued his studies from 1957 to 1959 at the Werk und Kunstschule in Wiesbaden and from 1959 to 1961 at the Akademie der Bildenden Künste in Karlsruhe.

Since 1959 he had lived and worked in Karlsruhe. His most important works are the sculpture at the Elisabeth Selbert school in Karlsruhe and the Rappenbrunnen in Karlsruhe-Durlach. The sculpture at the Elisabeth Selbert school has a height of 3.10m (10 feet 2 inches) and is made of granite with a marmor sculpture. The Rappenbrunnen is also made of granite with a horse and bull head made of diabase which symbolize the names of the two crossing streets on which it has been erected.

== Awards ==
- Art prize of the city of Karlsruhe 1965

== Works ==
- Sculpture at the Elisabeth-Selbert -Schule in Karlsruhe
- Rappenbrunnen in Karlsruhe-Durlach
- Bust of Prof. Dr. Rudolf Criegee at the institute for organic chemistry in Karlsruhe

== Exhibitions ==
- 1997, Xylon Museum+Werstätten at castle of Schwetzingen
