= David Carstens =

South African boxer

Olympic medal record

Men's Boxing

Representing South Africa
| Gold medal – first place | 1932 Los Angeles | Light heavyweight |

David Daniel Carstens (23 September 1913 – 6 August 1955) was a South African boxer who competed in the Olympic Games in 1932. He won the gold medal in the light heavyweight competition in Los Angeles, beating Gino Rossi of Italy in the final match. He was born in Strand

== 1932 Olympic record ==
- Quarterfinal: defeated Hans Berger (Germany) on points
- Semifinal: defeated Peter Jorgensen (Denmark) on points
- Final: defeated Gino Rossi (Italy) on points (won gold medal)
