= Carmelo Robledo =

Argentine boxer

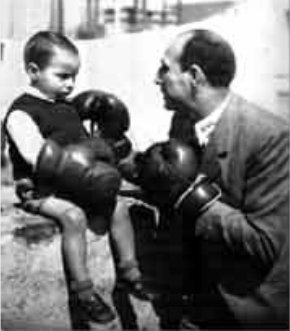

Medal record

Representing Argentina

Men's Boxing
Gold medal – first place	1932 Los Angeles	Featherweight

Carmelo Ambrosio Robledo (July 13, 1912 – November 9, 1961) was an Argentine boxer who competed in the 1928 Summer Olympics and in the 1932 Summer Olympics. In 1928 he was eliminated in the quarterfinals of the bantamweight competition. Four years later he won the gold medal in the featherweight class after winning the final against Josef Schleinkofer of Germany.

== 1928 Olympic results ==
- Round of 32: bye
- Round of 16: defeated Emiel Van Rumbecke of Belgium by decision
- Quarterfinal: lost to Frank Taylor of Ireland by decision

== 1932 Olympic results ==
- Round of 16: bye
- Quarterfinal: defeated Ernest Smith of Ireland by decision
- Semifinal: defeated Allan Carlsson of Sweden by decision
- Final: defeated Josef Schleinkofer of Germany by decision (won gold medal)
