= Amado Azar =

Argentine boxer (1913–1971)

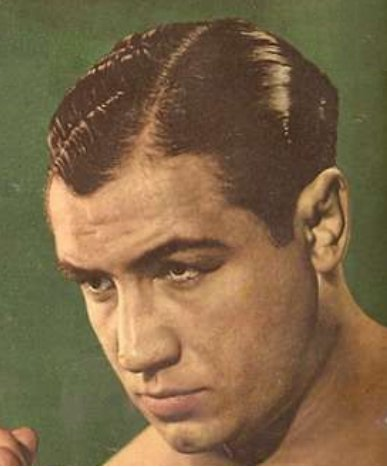

Medal record

Men's Boxing

Representing Argentina

Olympic Games
| Silver medal – second place | 1932 Los Angeles | Middleweight |

Amado Azar (December 31, 1913 – April 11, 1971) was an Argentine boxer who competed in the 1932 Summer Olympics. In 1932 he won the silver medal in the middleweight class after losing the final against Carmen Barth of the United States. Azar was the brother of fellow boxer Jorje Azar.

== 1932 Olympic results ==
Below is the record of Amado Azar, an Argentinian middleweight boxer who competed at the 1932 Los Angeles Olympics:

- Round of 16: bye
- Quarterfinal: defeated Aldo Longinotti (Italy) by decision
- Semifinal: defeated Roger Michelot (France) by decision
- Final: lost to Carmen Barth (United States) by decision (was awarded silver medal)
