= Richard Vogt (boxer) =

German boxer

Olympic medal record

Men's Boxing
Silver medal – second place	1936 Berlin	light heavyweight

Richard Vogt (26 January 1913 – 13 July 1988) was a German boxer who competed in the 1936 Summer Olympics.

In 1936 he won the silver medal in the light heavyweight class after losing the final against Roger Michelot.

== 1936 Olympic results ==
Below is the record of Richard Vogt, a German light heavyweight boxer who competed at the 1936 Berlin Olympics:

- Round of 32: bye
- Round of 16: defeated Erminio Bolzan (Italy) on points
- Quarterfinal: defeated Hannes Koivunen (Finland) on points
- Semifinal: defeated Francisco Risiglione (Argentina) on points
- Final: lost to Roger Michelot (France) on points (was awarded silver medal)

== Pro career ==
After turning pro in 1938 Vogt, known as "Riedel", became a three-time German Light Heavyweight champion, and in 1942 lost on points in a fight for the European Light Heavyweight Title against Luigi Musina. In 1948, before a crowd of 20,000 in Berlin, he beat former World Heavyweight champion Max Schmeling, aged 43, in the latter's last fight. Vogt had another 15 fights and retired at the age of 39 in 1952.

He spent his twilight years in a retirement home in Hamburg-Wandsbek. Vogt, who suffered from cancer and Parkinson's disease, died at the age of 75. In 2003, the Riedel-Vogt-Weg in the Jenfeld district of Hamburg was named after him.
