= Bruno Ahlberg =

Finnish boxer (1911–1966)

- Ahlberg with his American coach Artie Rose and manager Paul Damski in 1939

Personal information
- Born: 23 April 1911 Espoo, Finland
- Died: 9 February 1966 (aged 54) Helsinki, Finland

Sport
- Sport: Boxing
Medal record
Representing Finland
Olympic Games
| Bronze medal – third place | 1932 Los Angeles | Welterweight |

Bruno Valfrid Ahlberg (born 23 April 1911 – 9 February 1966) was a Finnish boxer who competed in the 1932 and 1936 Summer Olympics. In 1932, he became the first Finnish boxer to win an Olympic medal, a bronze in the welterweight division. Four years later he lost his first bout in the middleweight competition.

Alhberg first competed nationally in ski jumping and swimming. He then changed to boxing and won the national titles in 1932 and 1933, placing second in 1935 representing Kiffen. After the 1936 Olympics, he turned professional and had a series of matches in South Africa (1937), the United States (1939) and Europe (1938 and 1940–41). He retired in 1941 with a record of 11 wins, 9 losses and 5 draws. In 2008, he was inducted into the Finnish Boxing Hall of Fame.

== 1932 Olympic results ==
Bruno Ahlberg competed as a welterweight boxer for Finland at the 1932 Olympic Games in Los Angeles. Here are his results from that tournament:

- Round of 16: defeated Tony Mancini (Canada) by decision
- Quarterfinal: defeated Luciano Fabbroni (Italy) by decision
- Semifinal: lost to Erich Campe (Germany) by decision
- Bronze Medal Match: defeated Dave McCleave (Great Britain) by walkover (won bronze medal)
