= Allan Carlsson (boxer) =

Swedish boxer (1910–1983)

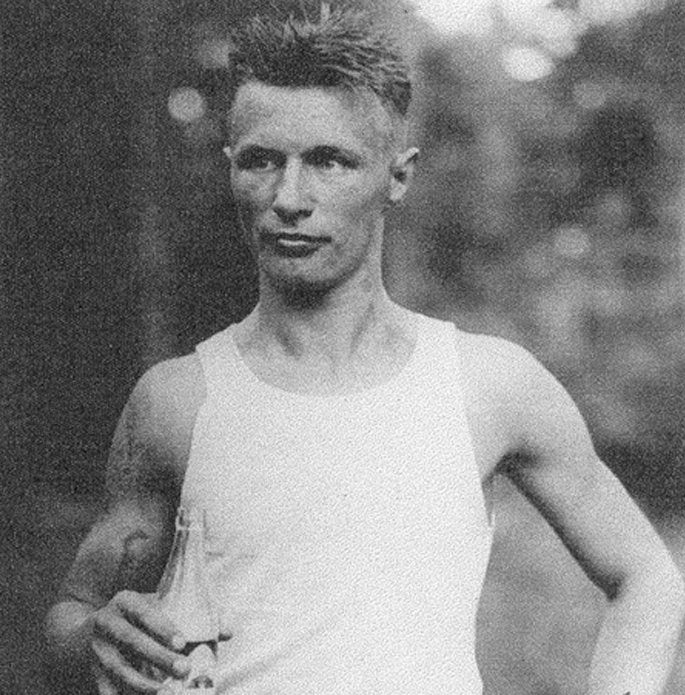

Personal information
- Born: 8 November 1910 Örebro, Sweden
- Died: 17 November 1983 (aged 73) Norrköping, Sweden

Sport
- Sport: Boxing
- Club: Örebro AK
Medal record
Men's Boxing
Representing Sweden
Olympic Games
Bronze medal – third place	1932 Los Angeles	Featherweight

Carl Allan Carlsson (later Ekbäck, 8 November 1910 – 17 November 1983) was a Swedish boxer who won a bronze medal in the featherweight division at the 1932 Summer Olympics.

Known for his technical skills, Carlsson won four Swedish titles, as a featherweight in 1932 and as a lightweight in 1933, 1934 and 1936. He never turned professional. His brother Gösta also competed as a boxer.

== 1932 Olympic results ==
Below are the results of Allan Carlsson, a Swedish featherweight boxer who competed at the 1932 Olympic Games

- Round of 16: defeated Katsuo Kameoka (Japan) on points
- Quarterfinal: defeated John Hines (United States) on points
- Semifinal: lost to Carmelo Robledo (Argentina) on points
- Bronze Medal Bout: defeated Gaspare Alessandri (Italy) on points (won bronze medal)
