= Johnny Miler =

American boxer

Personal information
- Born: John Miletich; August 10, 1910 Hocking, Iowa, United States
- Died: June 17, 1976 (aged 65) Iowa City, Iowa, United States
- Height: 6 ft 1 in (1.85 m)
- Weight: Light heavyweight Heavyweight

Boxing career

Boxing record
- Total fights: 31
- Wins: 12
- Win by KO: 7
- Losses: 12
- Draws: 3
- No contests: 4
Medal record
Men's boxing
Representing the United States
Olympic Games

Johnny Miler (August 10, 1910 – June 17, 1976), born John Miletich, was a professional boxer who competed in the 1932 Summer Olympics in the light-heavyweight class for the United States.

In late 1932 or early 1933, Miler defeated future heavyweight champion Joe Louis in an amateur bout. Other notable fights included three professional bouts against "Slapsie" Maxie Rosenbloom that ended in two losses and a no decision, and a four round exhibition bout against Max Baer in 1934.

Miler quit professional boxing in 1938. He is the great-uncle of UFC Hall of Fame mixed martial artist Pat Miletich.

== Early life ==
Born John Miletich to Croatian immigrant parents in Hocking, Iowa, a vanished coal mining town just south of Albia, Miler farmed and worked the local coal mines. He supplemented his income by accepting the challenges of traveling carnival strongmen, defeating them in wrestling or boxing matches. He moved to Detroit in 1930.

== Boxing ==
=== Joe Louis ===
Miler defeated Louis in three rounds in what was Louis' first organized boxing match, sending Louis to the mat seven times.

=== 1932 Summer Olympics ===
Despite evidence that Miler had boxed professionally, he won the 1932 Olympic trials in San Francisco and represented the United States in Los Angeles in the light-heavyweight class. Miler lost to William Murphy of Ireland on points in the first match.

=== Professional boxing ===
Miler 'officially' debuted professionally as a light-heavyweight on January 12, 1933, against Leon Jasinski in Grand Rapids, Michigan, winning the bout on points. He went on to compile a 12 win (7 by knockout) – 12 loss – 3 draw record over the next 5 1/2 years.

== After boxing ==
Miler eventually joined the Navy then returned to Albia, joining the police force. Miler died on June 17, 1976, in Iowa City, Iowa.

== Professional boxing record ==
12 Wins (7 knockouts, 5 decisions), 12 Losses (7 knockouts, 4 decisions, 1 disqualification), 3 Draws
Result	Record	Opponent	Type	Rd., Time	Date	Location	Notes
Loss	12-12-3	Johnny Paycheck	TKO	3 (8)	October 17, 1938	(United States) Des Moines, Iowa	
Loss	12-11-3	Jimmy Adamick	TKO	2 (10)	April 16, 1937	(United States) Detroit, Michigan	
Loss	12-10-3	Moose Irwin	Points	6	February 16, 1937	(United States) Los Angeles, California	
Draw	12-9-3	Joe Bauer	Technical Draw	10	February 2, 1937	(United States) Modesto, California	The bout was declared a technical draw after Bauer inflicted an injury to Miller's hip.
Loss	12-9-2	Bob Nestell	KO	2 (10), 1:51	November 27, 1936	(United States) Hollywood, California	
Loss	12-8-2	Art "Young" Campbell	Disqualification	11 (15)	April 13, 1936	Sydney, New South Wales, Australia	Miller was disqualified after repeated warnings about blows to the back
Loss	12-7-2	Ambrose Palmer	TKO	8 (15)	March 16, 1936	Sydney, New South Wales, Australia	Stopped due to cut eye
Win	12-6-2	Pret Ferrar	No Decision (Newspaper decision)	10	November 12, 1935	(United States) Des Moines, Iowa	Newspaper decision from Oelwein Daily Register
Win	12-6-2	Harry Hobbs	No Decision (Newspaper decision)	8	October 15, 1935	(United States) Ottumwa, Iowa	Newspaper decision from Waterloo Daily Courier
Loss	12-6-2	Fred Lenhart	TKO	8 (10)	June 26, 1935	(United States) Spokane, Washington	Declined to continue after 10 minute rest following 7th Round charge of foul
Loss	12-5-2	Abe Feldman	TKO	5 (10)	May 10, 1935	(United States) Hollywood, California	Stopped due to cut eye
Draw	12-4-2	Wesley Ketchell	Draw (points)	10	April 12, 1935	(United States) Hollywood, California	
Loss	12-4-1	Frank Rowsey	Loss (points)	10	March 1, 1935	(United States) Hollywood, California	
Loss	12-3-1	Maxie Rosenbloom	Loss (points)	10	February 5, 1935	(United States) Los Angeles, California	
Loss	12-2-1	Ray Actis	TKO	6 (10), 1:35	January 4, 1935	(United States) San Francisco, California	
Draw	12-1-1	Maxie Rosenbloom	No Decision (Newspaper decision)	10	October 22, 1934	(United States) Des Moines, Iowa	Newspaper decision from The Des Moines Register
Win	12-1-1	Joe Goeders	No Decision (Newspaper decision)	8	September 3, 1934	(United States) Graettinger, Iowa	Newspaper decision from Emmetsburg Reporter
Win	12-1-1	Johnny Neumann	TKO	4 (8)	August 16, 1934	(United States) Knoxville, Iowa	
Win	11-1-1	Jack Stocker	KO	4 (10)	July 26, 1934	(United States) Oskaloosa, Iowa	
Win	10-1-1	Johnny Saxon	KO	3 (10)	May 29, 1934	(United States) Des Moines, Iowa	
Win	9-1-1	Red Fields	KO	3 (10)	May 23, 1934	(United States) Ottumwa, Iowa	
Win	8-1-1	Billy Thomas	KO	3 (10)	April 23, 1934	(United States) New Orleans, Louisiana	
Loss	7-1-1	Maxie Rosenbloom	Decision (split)	10	April 9, 1934	(United States) New Orleans, Louisiana	
Win	7-0-1	Al White	Points	4	March 1, 1934	(United States) Miami, Florida	
Win	6-0-1	Johnny Whiters	Points	10	December 12 (est.), 1934	Unknown	
Draw	5-0-1	Joe Lipps	Draw (points)	8	October 30, 1933	(United States) Asheville, North Carolina	
Win	5-0-0	Ed Anderson	Points	8	October 18, 1933	(United States) Mount Clemens, Michigan	
Win	4-0-0	Flash Ryser	KO	Unknown	March 1 (est.), 1933	(United States) Detroit, Michigan	
Win	3-0-0	Willie Davies	Points	8	February 1, 1933	(United States) Detroit, Michigan	"Beeftrust" Tournament
Win	2-0-0	Bobby Mathews	KO	1 (3)	February 1, 1933	(United States) Detroit, Michigan	"Beeftrust" Tournament
Win	1-0-0	Leon Jasinski	Points	6	January 12, 1933	(United States) Grand Rapids, Michigan	
