= Ernest Peirce =

South African boxer (1909–1998)

Medal record

Men's Boxing

Representing South Africa

Olympic Games
Bronze medal – third place	1932 Los Angeles	Middleweight

British Empire Games
Bronze medal – third place	1930 Hamilton	Middleweight

Ernest "Eddie" Peirce (25 September 1909 – 23 January 1998) was a South African boxer who competed in the 1932 Summer Olympics in Los Angeles.

He was born in Somerset West and died in Apache Junction, Arizona, United States.

In 1932 he won the bronze medal in the middleweight classification after winning the third-place fight against Roger Michelot of France by walkover.

Two years earlier, Peirce won the middleweight bronze medal at the 1930 British Empire Games.

He is buried in the National Memorial Cemetery of Arizona in Phoenix.

== 1932 Olympic results ==
Below are the results of Ernest Peirce, a South African middleweight boxer, who competed at the 1932 Los Angeles Olympics:

- Round of 16: bye
- Quarterfinal: defeated Lajos Szigeti (Hungary) on points
- Semifinal: lost to Carmen Barth (United States) on points
- Bronze Medal Match: won by walkover versus Roger Michelot (France)
