= Gino Rossi (boxer) =

Italian boxer (1908–1987)

Olympic medal record

Representing Italy

Men's Boxing
Silver medal – second place	1932 Los Angeles	Light heavyweight

Gino Rossi (May 29, 1908 – September 9, 1987) was an Italian boxer who competed in the Olympic Games in 1932. He was born in Piacenza. He won the silver medal in the light heavyweight competition in Los Angeles, losing to David Carstens of South Africa in the gold-medal match.

== 1932 Olympic results ==
- Quarterfinal: defeated Nikolaos Mastoridis (Greece) on points
- Semifinal: defeated William Murphy (Ireland) by walkover
- Final: lost to David Carstens (South Africa) on points (was awarded silver medal)
