= Francisco Risiglione =

Argentine boxer (1917–1999)

Personal information
- Born: January 18, 1917 Rosario, Argentina
- Died: July 28, 1999 (aged 82)
Medal record
Men's Boxing
Representing Argentina
Bronze medal – third place	1936 Berlin	light heavyweight

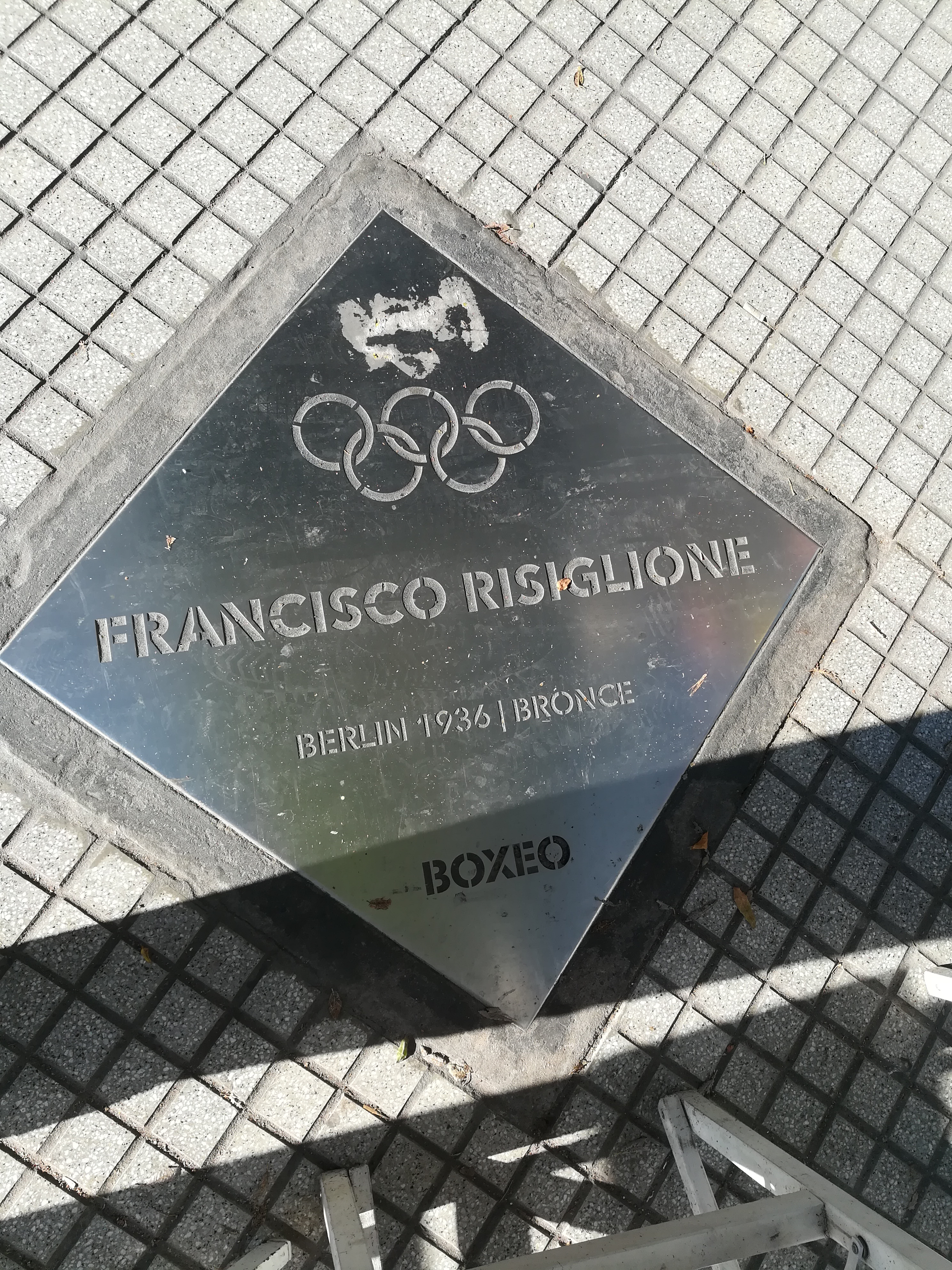

Francisco Risiglione (January 18, 1917 – July 28, 1999) was an Argentine boxer who competed in the 1936 Summer Olympics.

In 1936, he won the bronze medal in the light heavyweight class after winning the third place fight against Robey Leibbrandt of South Africa.
