= Roger Michelot =

French boxer (1912–1993)

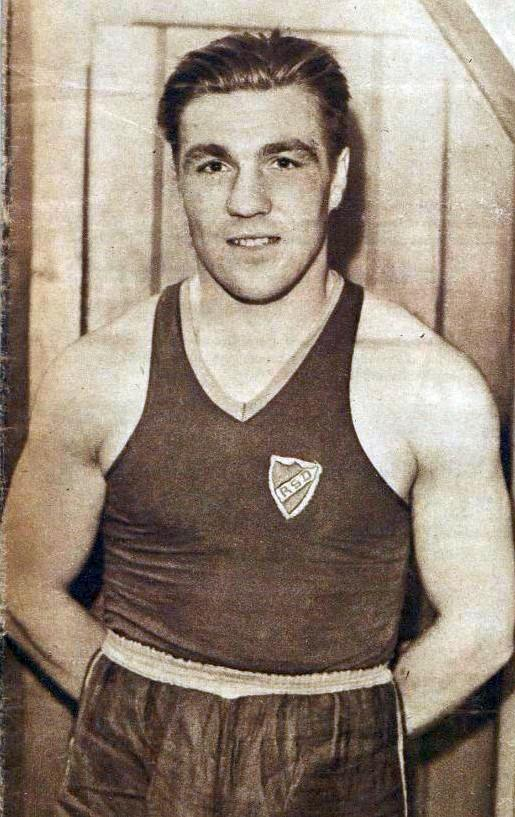

Medal record

Men's boxing

Representing France

Olympic Games
Gold medal – first place	1936 Berlin	Light heavyweight

Roger Michelot (8 June 1912 in Saint-Dizier, Haute-Marne – 19 March 1993) was a French boxer who competed at the 1932 Summer Olympics and the 1936 Summer Olympics. In 1936 he won the gold medal in the light heavyweight class after winning the final against Richard Vogt. Born in Saint-Dizier, Haute-Marne he also competed at the 1932 Summer Olympics.

== 1932 Olympic results ==
Below is the record of Roger Michelot, a French middleweight boxer who competed at the 1932 Los Angeles Olympics:

- Round of 16: defeated Louis Lavoie (Canada) on points
- Quarterfinal: defeated Hans Bernlohr (Germany) on points
- Semifinal: lost to Amado Azar (Argentina) on points
- Bronze-Medal Bout: lost to Ernest Peirce (South Africa) by walkover

== 1936 Olympics record ==
Below is the record of Roger Michelot of France at the 1936 Berlin Olympics. Michelot competed in the light heavyweight boxing division and won the gold medal:

- Round of 32: bye
- Round of 16: bye
- Quarterfinal: defeated Borge Soren Jorgenson Holm (Denmark) on points
- Semifinal: defeated Robey Leibbrant (South Africa) on points
- Final: defeated Richard Vogt (Germany) on points (won gold medal)
