= Río Seco =

Río Seco, Rio Seco, Rioseco or Seco River may refer to:

== Argentina ==
- Río Seco Department (province of Córdoba)
- Villa de María del Río Seco, head town of the above
- Río Seco (Argentina), a river
- Río Seco, Tucumán, a settlement

== Colombia ==
- San Juan de Rioseco (Cundinamarca)

== Panama ==
- Río Seco, Panama Province

== Puerto Rico ==
- Río Seco, Puerto Rico, a river in southern Puerto Rico

== Spain ==
- Boadilla de Rioseco (province of Palencia)
- Medina de Rioseco (province of Valladolid)
- Rioseco de Tapia (province of León)
- Rioseco de Soria (province of Soria)
  - Rioseco Abbey, former monastery in Rioseco (Burgos)

== See also ==
- Arroyo Seco (disambiguation)
