= Seco =

Seco or SECO may refer to:

== Gastronomy ==
- Seco (wine), dry wine
- Seco (food), an Ecuadorian meat dish
- Seco Herrerano, the national alcoholic beverage of Panamá

== People ==
- David Seco (born 1973), Spanish professional racing cyclist
- Hugo Seco (born 1988), Portuguese professional footballer
- Manuel Seco (born 1928), Spanish lexicographer
- María Luisa Seco (1948–1988), Spanish television presenter
- Myriam Seco (born 1967), Spanish archaeologist

== Places ==
- Rito Seco, a creek in Colorado, U.S.
- Seco River may refer to Arroyo Seco (disambiguation) or Río Seco (disambiguation)
- Seco, Kentucky, a small town in the United States
- The ICAO airport code for Francisco de Orellana Airport, Ecuador
- Seco Island, in the Philippines

== Science ==
- seco-, chemical prefix indicating cleavage of a ring
- Secobarbital
- Seco (butterfly), a genus of metalmark butterflies in the tribe Riodinini
- Seco (tobacco), the mid-level leaves of a tobacco plant
- Second Engine Cut-Off, the shutdown of the second stage, a major milestone in the ascent of a multistage rocket

== Other uses ==
- Seco Rail, a French railway company
- SECO, a Sweden-based Metal-Cutting Tool Manufacturer. Part of Sandvik
- SECO Manufacturing CO, a California-based Surveying Equipment and Accessories Manufacturer. Part of Trimble
- SECO S.p.a., an Italian industrial electronics company among the founders of the Qseven standard form factor
- The Swiss State Secretariat for Economic Affairs
