= Sobremonte =

Sobremonte is the last name of Rafael de Sobremonte, 3rd Marquis of Sobremonte, viceroy of the Viceroyalty of the Río de la Plata.

Sobremonte may also refer to:

- Sobremonte Department of Córdoba, Argentina
- Marquis of Sobremonte provincial historical museum in Córdoba, Argentina
