= La Pampa, Córdoba =

Coordinates: 30°49′00″S 63°43′00″W

La Pampa
- Village
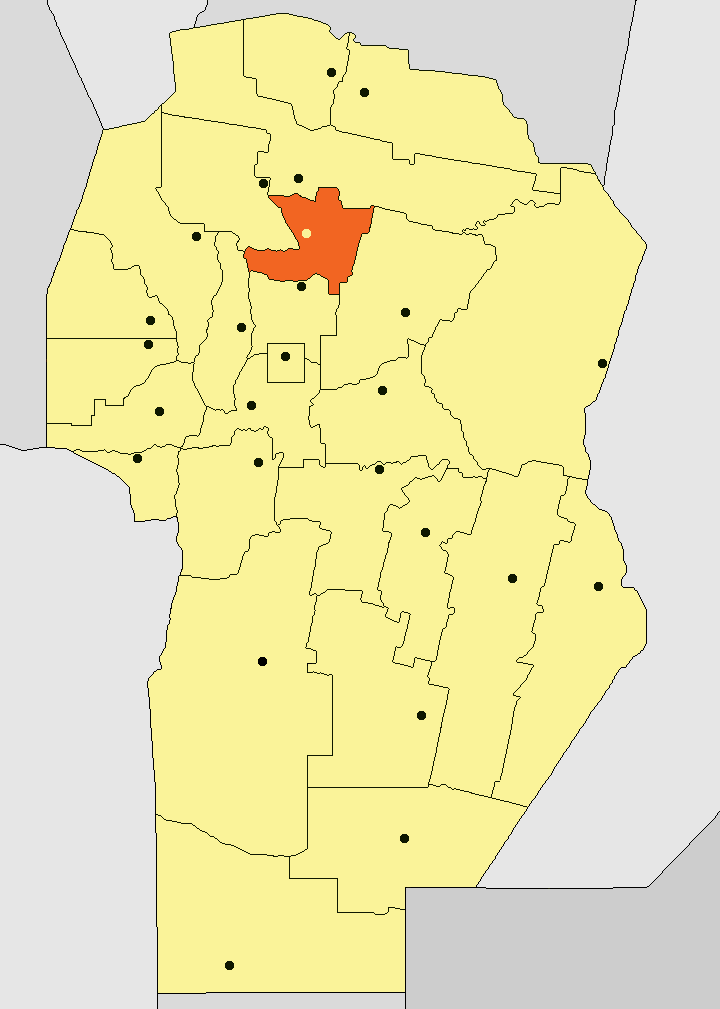
- Country: Argentina
- Province: Córdoba
- Department: Totoral

Government
  - Presidente comunal: Daniel Funes, UpC.
- Elevation: 233 m (764 ft)

Population (2001)
  - Total: 443
- Time zone: UTC−3 (ART)
- Postal code: X5117
- Area code: 03525

La Pampa is a village located in the Totoral Department, Córdoba Province, Argentina. It consists of 443 inhabitants (INDEC, 2001) and is located 5 kilometres (3 mi) from the provincial route E66 and 70 km (43 mi) from the city of Córdoba.

== Economy ==
La Pampa's main economic activity is tourism, due to its mountainous location and its proximity to other tourist centres such as La Paz, and Ascochinga.

Another important source of income is the creation of regional products such as alfajores, homemade jams, preserves, and others. Agriculture and livestock also have some relevance.

== Infrastructure ==
La Pampa has a clinic, a police station and a primary school in its town area.
