= Luis Oliva =

Luis Oliva may refer to:

- Luis Oliva (runner)
- Luis Oliva (Puerto Rican actor)
- Luis Oliva (Guatemalan actor)
