= Totoral Department =

Totoral Department Departamento Totoral
- Department
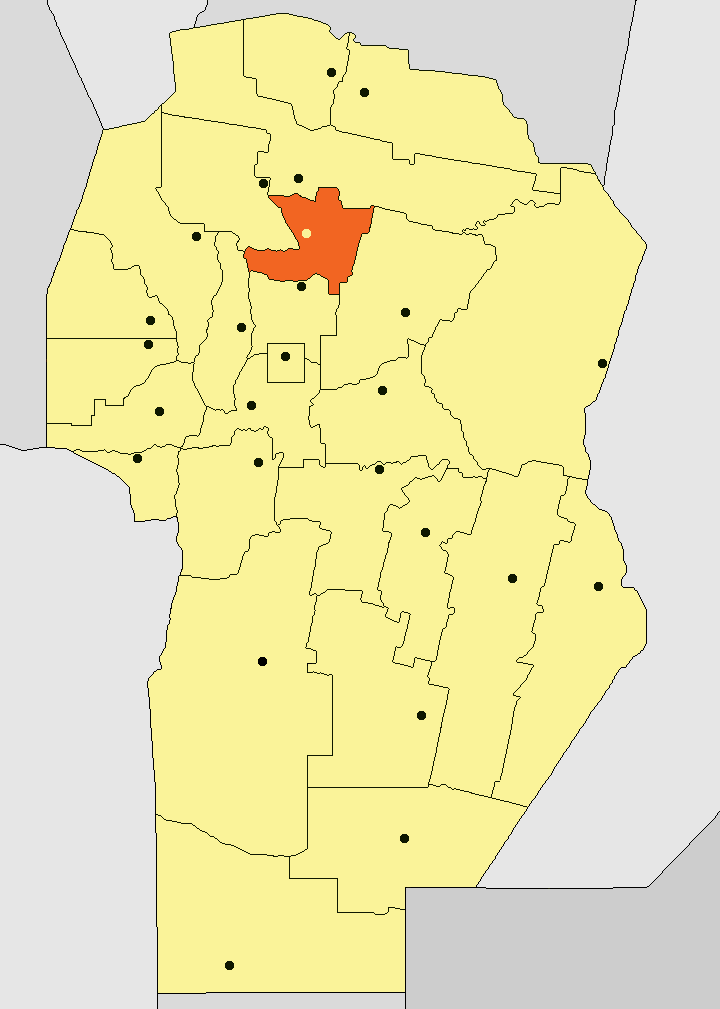
- Location of Totoral Department in Córdoba Province
- Coordinates: 30°49′S 63°43′W
- Country: Argentina
- Province: Córdoba
- Capital: Villa del Totoral

Area
  - Total: 3,145 km^{2} (1,214 sq mi)

Population (2001 census [INDEC])
  - Total: 16,479
  - Density: 5.240/km^{2} (13.57/sq mi)
  - Pop. change (1991-2001): +19.18%
- Time zone: UTC-3 (ART)
- Postal code: X5236
- Dialing code: 03524
- Distances to
- Buenos Aires: ?
- Córdoba: 77 km (48 mi)

Totoral Department is a department of Córdoba Province in Argentina.

The provincial subdivision has a population of about 16,479 inhabitants in an area of 3,145 km^{2}, and its capital city is Villa del Totoral.

== Settlements ==
- Candelaria Sud
- Cañada de Luque
- Capilla de Sitón
- La Pampa
- Las Peñas
- Los Mistoles
- Sarmiento
- Simbolar
- Sinsacate
- Villa del Totoral
