= Pocho Department =

Pocho Department Departamento Pocho
- Department
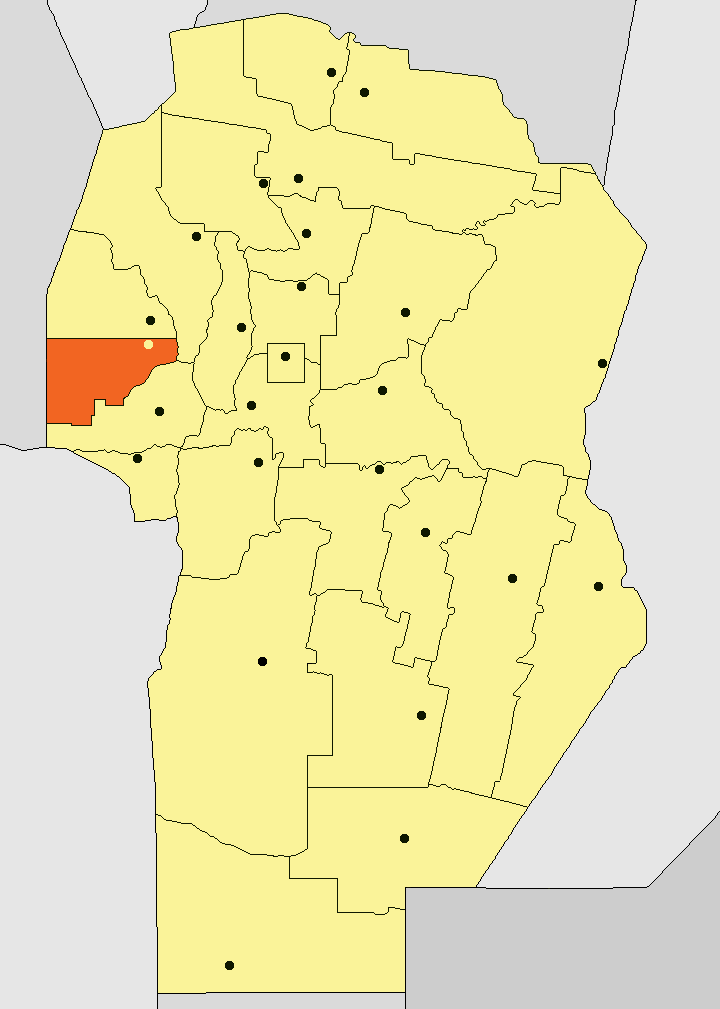
- Location of Pocho Department in Córdoba Province
- Coordinates: 31°19′S 65°04′W
- Country: Argentina
- Province: Córdoba
- Capital: Salsacate

Area
  - Total: 3,207 km^{2} (1,238 sq mi)

Population (2001 census [INDEC])
  - Total: 5,132
  - Density: 1.600/km^{2} (4.145/sq mi)
  - Pop. change (1991-2001): +1.48%
- Time zone: UTC-3 (ART)
- Postal code: X5295
- Dialing code: 03542
- Distances to
- Buenos Aires: 850 km (530 mi)
- Córdoba: 140 km (87 mi)

Pocho Department is a department of Córdoba Province in Argentina.

The provincial subdivision has a population of about 5,132 inhabitants in an area of 3,207 km^{2}, and its capital city is Salsacate, which is located around 850 km from Capital Federal.

== Settlements ==
- Chancaní
- Las Palmas
- Los Talares
- Salsacate
- San Gerónimo
- Tala Cañada
- Villa de Pocho
