= La Paz, Córdoba =

La Paz
- Town
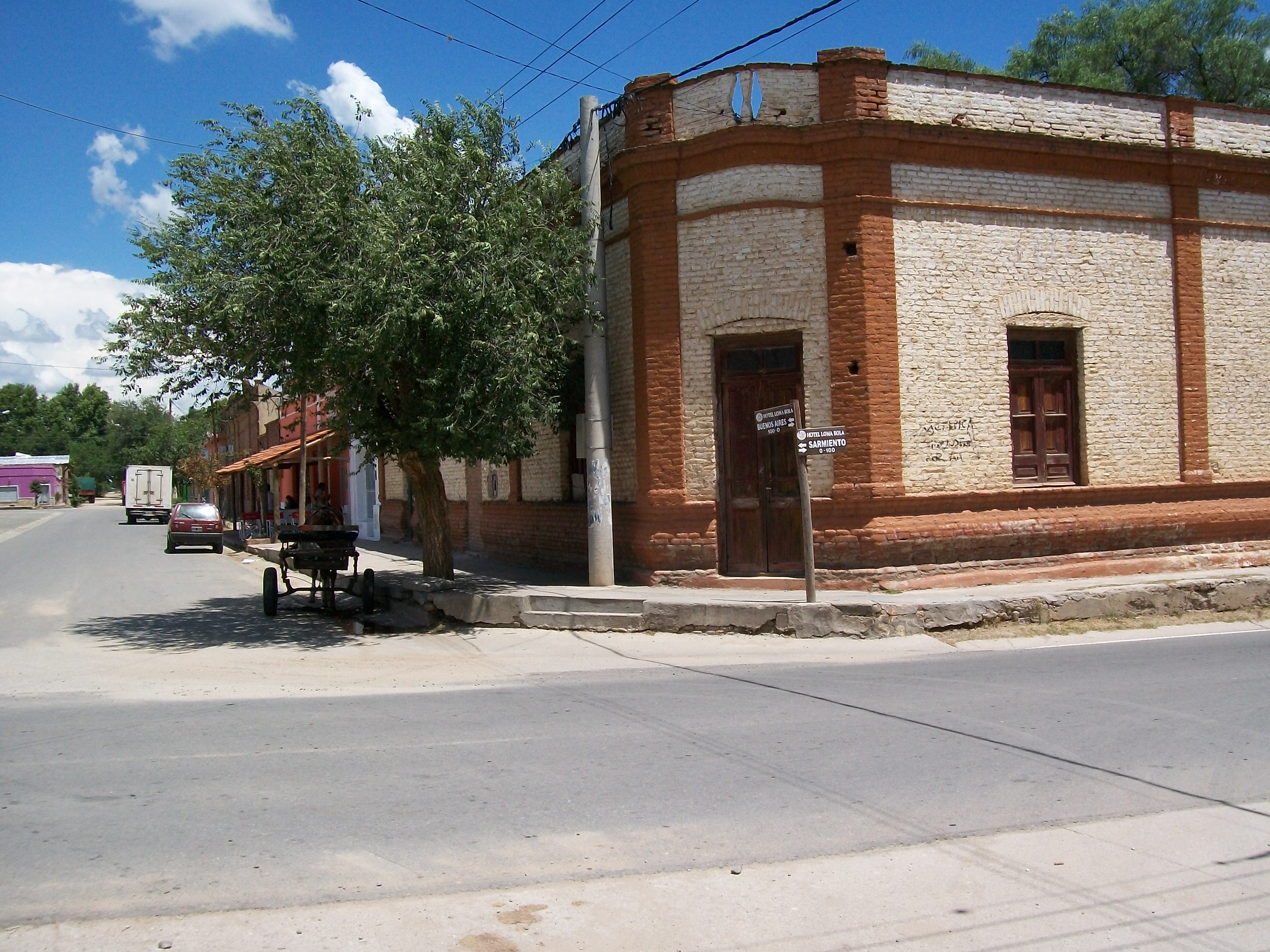
- Corner in downtown La Paz

- Location of La Paz in Argentina
- Coordinates: 31°56′00″S 65°12′00″W
- Country: Argentina
- Province: Córdoba
- Department: San Javier

Government
  - Intendant: Ramón Funes
- Elevation: 505 m (1,657 ft)

Population
  - Total: 1,783
- Demonym: Paceño
- Time zone: UTC−3 (ART)
- CPA base: X5870
- Dialing code: +54 3544

La Paz is a small town in the province of Córdoba, Argentina. Its population is 1189 inhabitants (2010 Census) and it is located 41 km (25 mi) from Villa Dolores.

The town grew around a Catholic church, San Juan de las Talas , built there in 1720, during colonial times.

== Economy ==
The main activity is tourism and the production of medical vegetables. One of its tourist attractions is Cerro Loma Bola (Loma Bola Hill), the Piedra Blanca stream, and wide native woods, as well as its local gastronomy.

Each August 29 the town celebrates the Virgen de la Merced.
