= Cruz del Eje Department =

Cruz del Eje Department Departamento Cruz del Eje
- Department
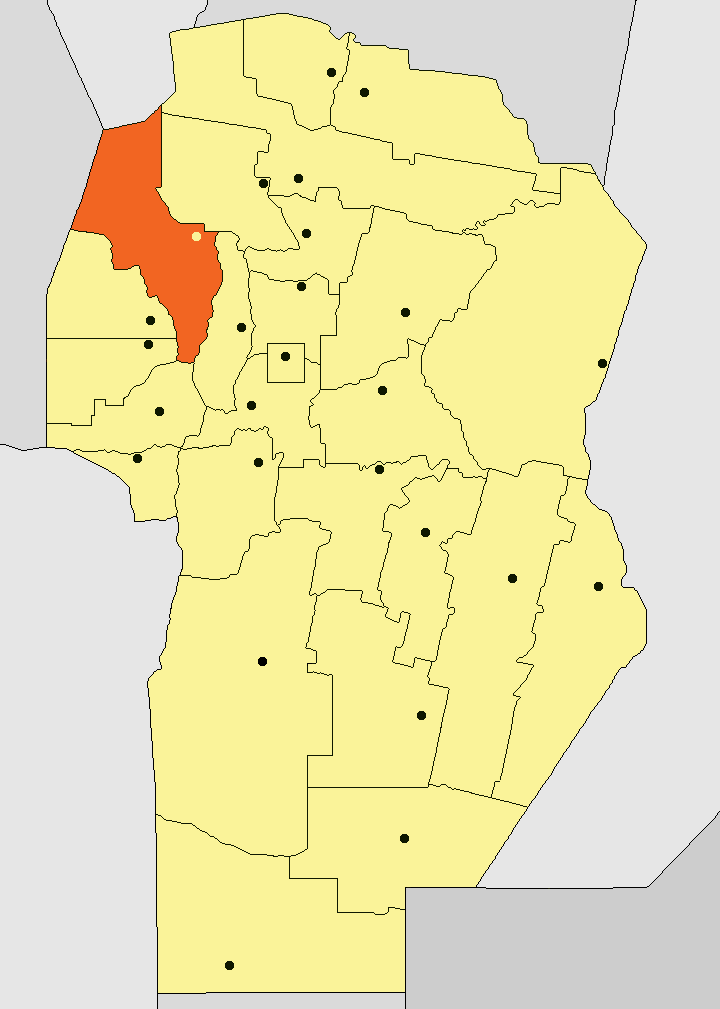
- Location of Cruz del Eje Department in Córdoba Province
- Coordinates: 30°43′S 64°44′W
- Country: Argentina
- Province: Córdoba
- Capital: Cruz del Eje

Area
  - Total: 6,653 km^{2} (2,569 sq mi)

Population (2001 census [INDEC])
  - Total: 52,172
  - Density: 7.842/km^{2} (20.31/sq mi)
  - Pop. change (1991-2001): +7.24%
- Time zone: UTC-3 (ART)
- Postal code: X5280
- Dialing code: 03549
- Distances to
- Buenos Aires: 861 km (535 mi)
- Córdoba: 151 km (94 mi)

Cruz del Eje Department is a department of Córdoba Province in Argentina.

The provincial subdivision has a population of about 52,172 inhabitants in an area of 6,653 km², and its capital city is Cruz del Eje, which is located around 861 km from Capital Federal.

== Settlements ==
- Alto de Los Quebrachos
- Bañado de Soto
- Cruz de Caña
- Cruz del Eje
- El Brete
- Guanaco Muerto
- La Batea
- La Higuera
- Las Cañadas
- Las Playas
- Los Chañaritos
- Media Naranja
- Paso Viejo
- San Marcos Sierras
- Serrezuela
- Tuclame
- Villa de Soto

== 1908 earthquake ==
On 22 September 1908 the region was struck by an earthquake measuring 6.5 on the Richter scale. The epicentre was around 30°30′0″S 64°30′0″W and it was felt as far as 100 km away.
