= Santa Rosa de Río Primero =

- Town
- Location of Santa Rosa de Río Primero in Argentina
- Coordinates: 31°9′S 63°23′W
- Country: Argentina
- Province: Córdoba
- Department: Río Primero

Government
  - Intendant: Daniel Kieffer (UCR)
- Elevation: 157 m (515 ft)

Population (2001)
  - Total: 6,788
- Time zone: UTC−3 (ART)
- CPA base: X5133
- Dialing code: +54 3574

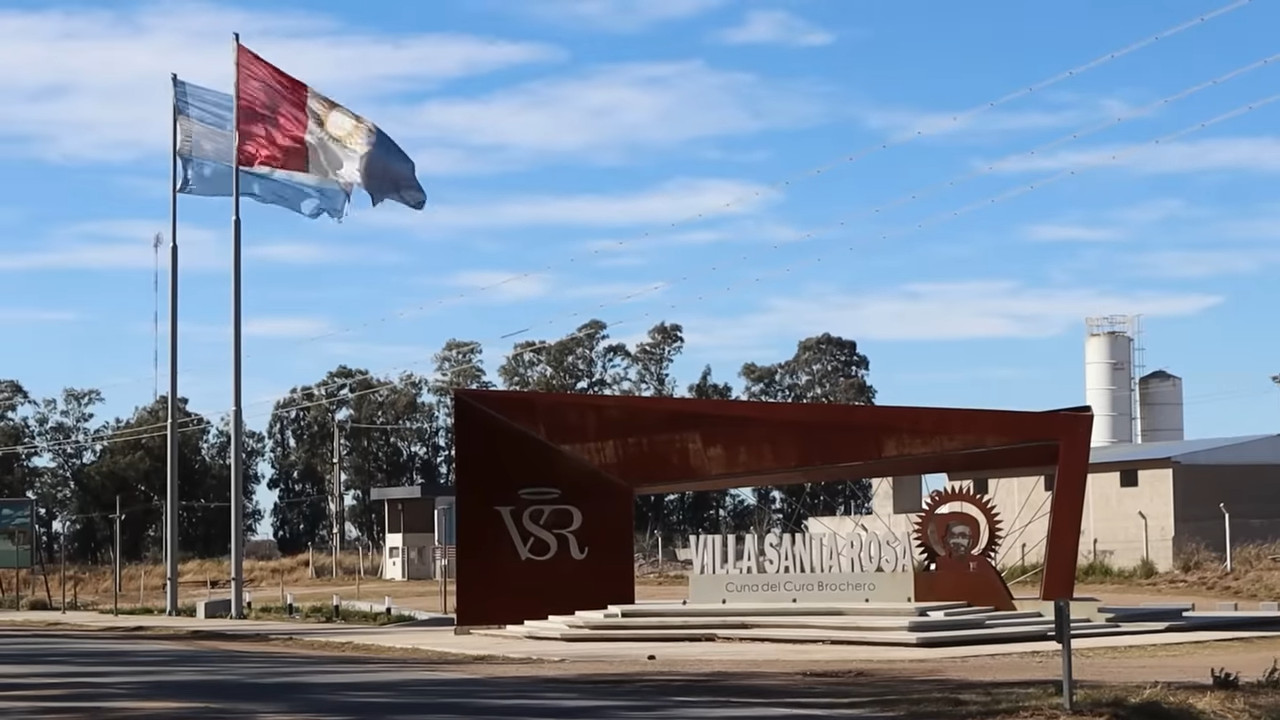
Villa Santa Rosa de Río Primero, Córdoba, Argentina

Santa Rosa de Río Primero is a town in the province of Córdoba, Argentina. It has 6,788 inhabitants per the 2001 census [INDEC], and is the head town of the Río Primero Department. It lies in the center-northeast of the province, by the Primero River (also known as Suquía), about 75 km from the provincial capital Córdoba.

== Notable people ==
- Jose Gabriel del Rosario Brochero was born in Santa Rosa de Rio Primero.
