= Villa del Totoral =

- Town
- Location of Villa del Totoral in Argentina
- Coordinates: 30°49′S 63°43′W
- Country: Argentina
- Province: Córdoba
- Department: Totoral

Government
  - Intendant: Cecilia Garay (JxC)

Population
  - Total: 7,110
- Time zone: UTC−3 (ART)
- CPA base: X5236
- Dialing code: +54 3524

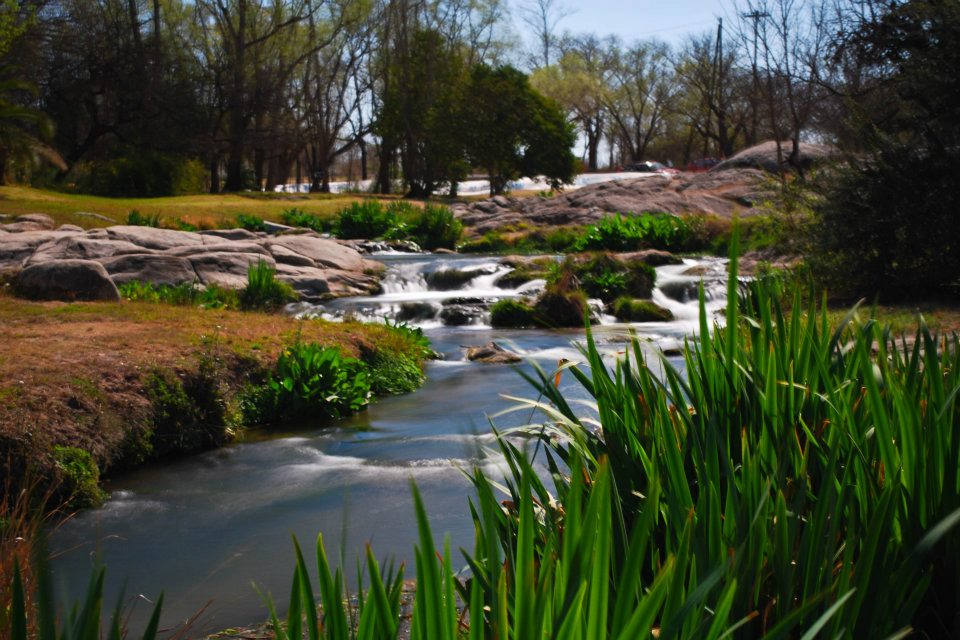

Villa del Totoral is a town in the province of Córdoba, Argentina. It has 7,110 inhabitants per the 2001 census [INDEC], and is the head town of the Totoral Department.
