= San Francisco del Chañar =

- Town
- Location of San Francisco del Chañar in Argentina
- Coordinates: 29°46′S 63°55′W
- Country: Argentina
- Province: Córdoba
- Department: Sobremonte

Government
  - Intendant: Sebastián Argañaraz
- Elevation: 64 m (210 ft)

Population
  - Total: 4,500
- Time zone: UTC−3 (ART)
- CPA base: X5209
- Dialing code: +54 3522

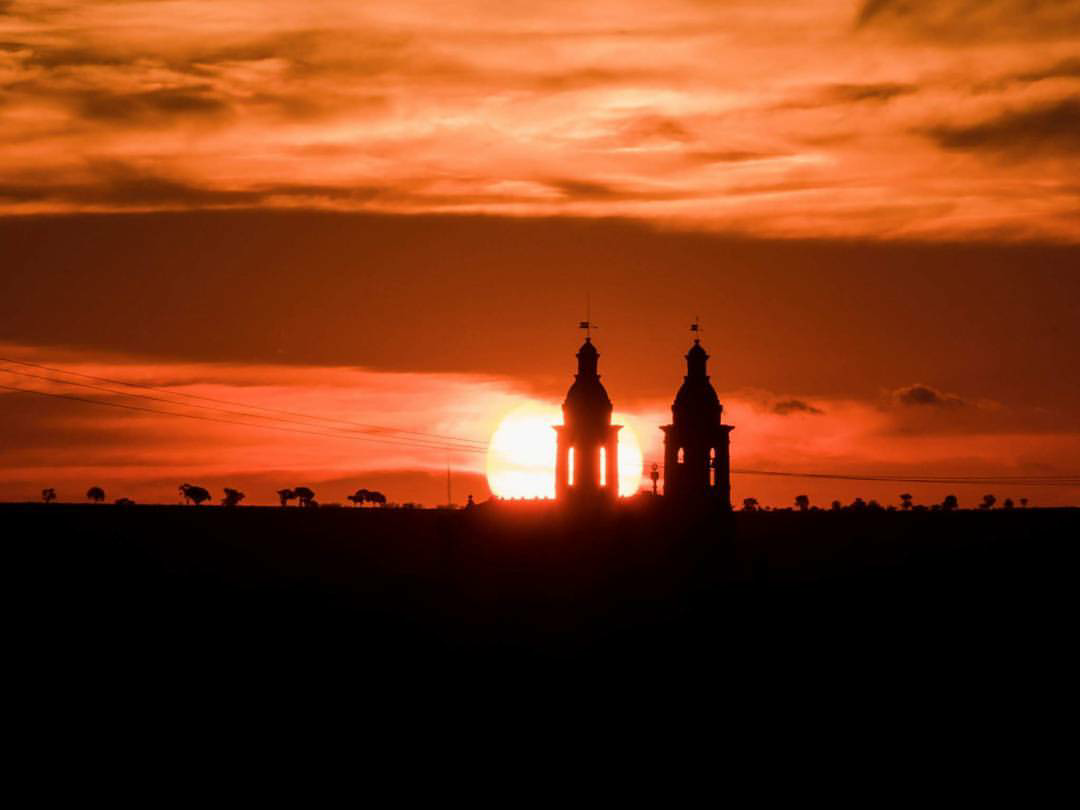
Image of a sunset in the town

San Francisco del Chañar is a town in the north of Córdoba Province in Argentina. It is the head town of the Sobremonte Department. It is approximately 200 kilometers from the provincial capital. It can be reached via Route 9, followed by an additional 30 kilometers along Route 22. The town lies along the historic Camino Real and has a population of around 4,500 people.
