= Gerardo Lorenzo =

Argentine field hockey player

Personal information
- Born: 16 March 1947 (age 79) Buenos Aires, Argentina
- Died: 12 January 2025 Buenos Aires, Argentina

Sport
- Sport: Field hockey

Gerardo Lorenzo (born 16 March 1947) is an Argentine field hockey player. He competed at the 1968 Summer Olympics and the 1972 Summer Olympics.
