= Mario Cardoso =

Uruguayan long jumper

Personal information
- Born: Uruguay

Sport
- Sport: Athletics
- Event: Long jump

Mario Cardoso was an Uruguayan track and field athlete who competed in the long jump. He represented Uruguay internationally and won a silver medal at the 1933 South American Championships in Athletics, held in Montevideo, with a jump of 6.47 metres.

== Career ==
Cardoso competed in the men's long jump at the 1933 South American Championships in Athletics, where he finished second, earning the silver medal for the host nation Uruguay. His best mark of 6.47 metres placed him behind only the gold medalist in the event and remains one of the notable Uruguayan performances of the pre-war era.

== International competitions ==
Year	Competition	Host city	Event	Position	Performance
1933	South American Championships	Montevideo, Uruguay	Long jump	Silver	6.47 m
