= Río Primero Department =

Río Primero Department Departamento Río Primero
- Department
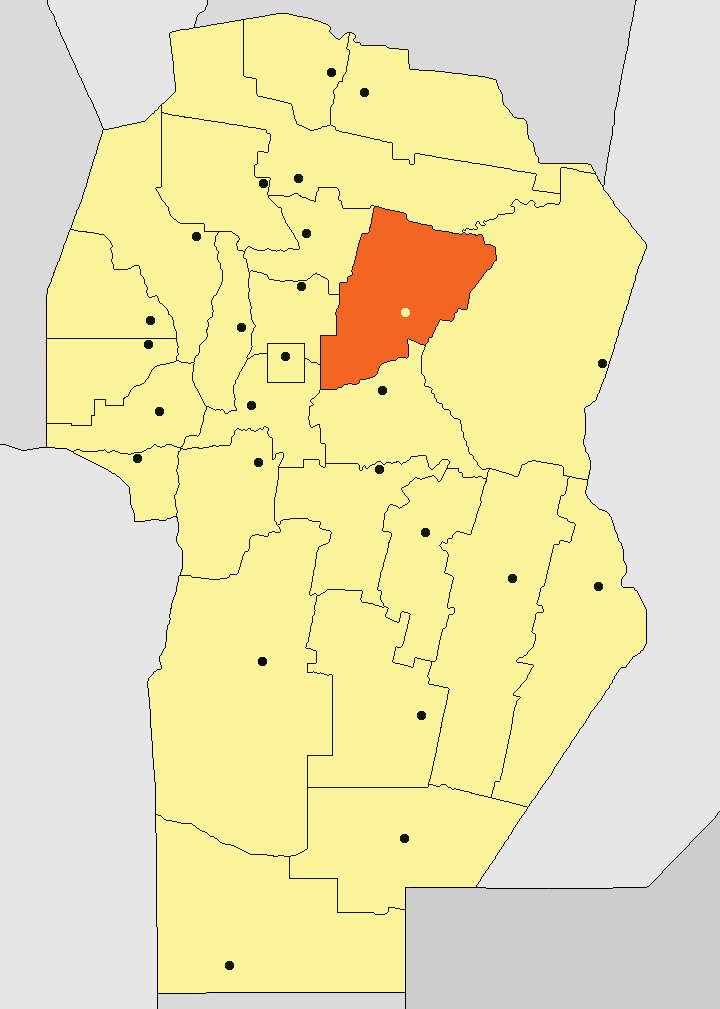
- Location of Río Primero Department in Córdoba Province
- Coordinates: 31°08′S 63°22′W
- Country: Argentina
- Province: Córdoba
- Capital: Santa Rosa de Río Primero

Area
  - Total: 6,753 km^{2} (2,607 sq mi)

Population (2001 census [INDEC])
  - Total: 42,429
  - Density: 6.283/km^{2} (16.27/sq mi)
  - Pop. change (1991–2001): 13.49
- Time zone: UTC-3 (ART)
- Postal code: X5133
- Dialing code: 03574
- Distances to
- Buenos Aires: ?
- Córdoba: 100 km (62 mi)

Río Primero Department is a department of Córdoba Province in Argentina.

The provincial subdivision has a population of about 42,429 inhabitants in an area of 6,753 km^{2}, and its capital city is Santa Rosa de Río Primero.

== Settlements ==
- Atahona
- Cañada de Machado
- Capilla de los Remedios
- Chalacea
- Colonia Las Cuatro Esquinas
- Comechingones
- Diego de Rosas
- El Crispín
- Esquina
- Kilómetro 658
- La Para
- La Posta
- La Puerta
- La Quinta
- Las Gramillas
- Las Saladas
- Maquinista Gallini
- Monte Cristo
- Obispo Trejo
- Piquillín
- Plaza de Mercedes
- Río Primero
- Sagrada Familia
- Santa Rosa de Río Primero
- Villa Fontana
