= San Javier Department, Córdoba =

San Javier Department Departamento San Javier
- Department
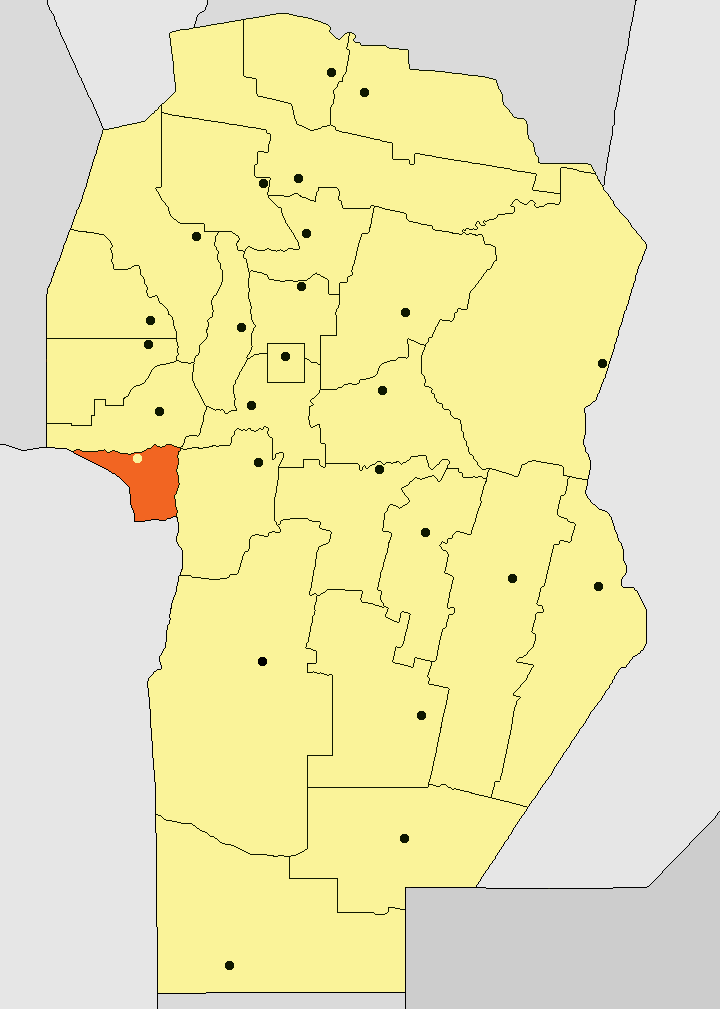
- Location of San Javier Department in Córdoba Province
- Coordinates: 31°56′S 65°12′W
- Country: Argentina
- Province: Córdoba
- Capital: Villa Dolores

Area
  - Total: 1,652 km^{2} (638 sq mi)

Population (2001 census [INDEC])
  - Total: 48,951
  - Density: 29.63/km^{2} (76.74/sq mi)
  - Pop. change (1991-2001): +14.99%
- Time zone: UTC-3 (ART)
- Postal code: X5870
- Dialing code: 03544
- Distances to
- Buenos Aires: ?
- Córdoba: 166 km (103 mi)

San Javier Department is a department of Córdoba Province in Argentina.

The provincial subdivision has a population of about 48,951 inhabitants in an area of 1,652 km², and its capital city is Villa Dolores.

== Settlements ==
- Conlara
- La Paz
- La Población
- Las Tapias
- Los Cerrillos
- Los Hornillos
- Luyaba
- San Javier/Yacanto
- San José
- Villa de Las Rosas
- Villa Dolores
