= Salsacate =

- Town
- Location of Salsacate in Argentina
- Coordinates: 31°19′S 65°04′W
- Country: Argentina
- Province: Córdoba
- Department: Pocho

Government
  - Intendant: Karina Figueroa (UCR)
- Elevation: 910 m (2,990 ft)

Population
  - Total: 1,205
- Demonym: Salsacatense
- Time zone: UTC−3 (ART)
- CPA base: X5295
- Dialing code: +54 3542

Salsacate is a town in Córdoba Province in Argentina, it is the head town of Pocho Department
