= Luis Oliva (runner) =

Argentine runner (1908–2009)

Personal information
- Born: June 21, 1908 La Paz, Córdoba, Argentina
- Died: June 30, 2009 (aged 101)
Medal record
Men's athletics
Representing Argentina
South American Championships
Gold medal – first place	1931 Buenos Aires	3000 m
Gold medal – first place	1933 Montevideo	3000 m
Silver medal – second place	1933 Montevideo	5000 m

Luis Oliva (June 21, 1908 – June 30, 2009) was an Argentine athlete who competed in two Olympic Games in 1932 and 1936. He was born in La Paz, Córdoba, Argentina and was discovered while fulfilling military service in Argentina. He earned gold medals at the 1931 and 1933 South American Champions in the 3000m event and a silver in the 1933 5000m event.

In Los Angeles, he did not make the finals in the Men's 3000 steeplechase event because, at that time, Argentina did not specialize its athletes in any particular athletic event. In Berlin he did not finish in the Men's marathon, giving up after 23 miles, despite having trained under Juan Carlos Zabala, the winner of the 1932 competition. During those games, however, he received a personal greeting from Adolf Hitler and appeared in Leni Riefenstahl's documentary of the games. He sought to compete in the 1940 Summer Olympics before they were canceled, and later settled down as a physical education teacher in Argentina. He died on June 30, 2009, several days after his 101st birthday.

== See also ==
- List of centenarians (sportspeople)
