= Rioseco de Soria =

- Municipality
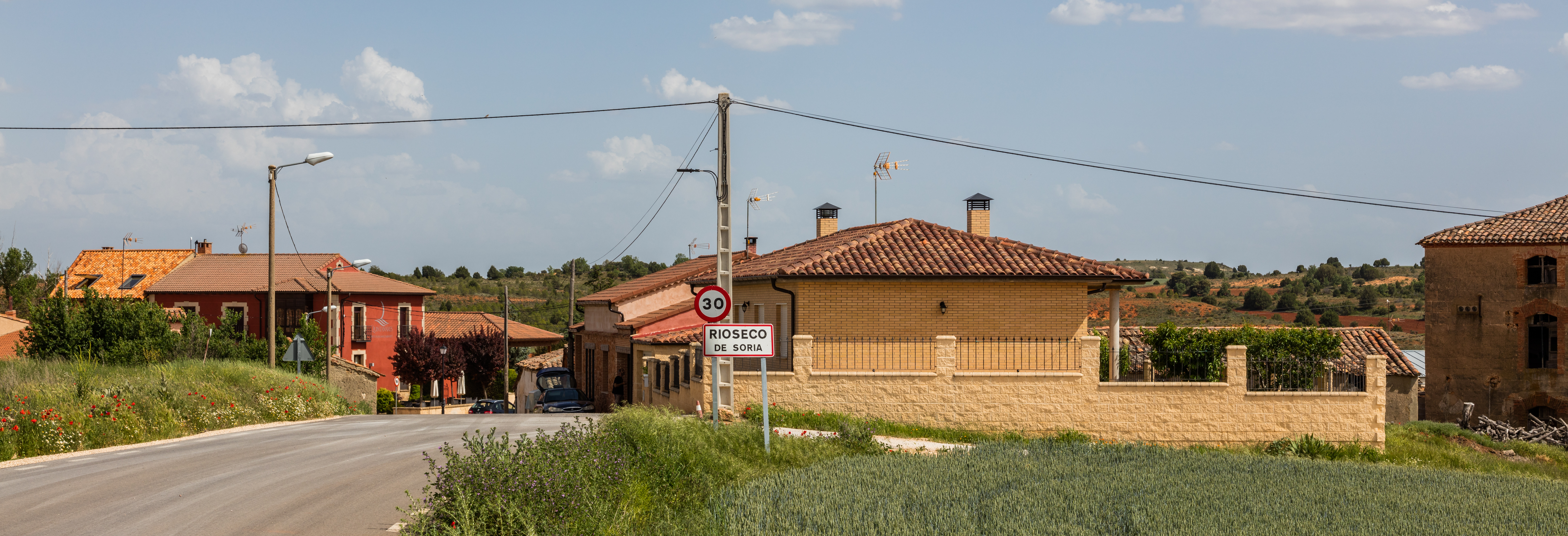

- Flag Coat of arms

- Location in Spain. Rioseco de Soria (Spain)
- Coordinates: 41.6500°N 2.8333°W
- Country: Spain
- Autonomous community: Castile and León
- Province: Soria
- Municipality: Rioseco de Soria

Area
  - Total: 49 km^{2} (19 sq mi)
- Elevation: 1,009 m (3,310 ft)

Population (2025-01-01)
  - Total: 123
  - Density: 2.5/km^{2} (6.5/sq mi)
- Time zone: UTC+1 (CET)
  - Summer (DST): UTC+2 (CEST)
- Website: Official website

Rioseco de Soria is a municipality located in the province of Soria, Castile and León, Spain. According to the 2004 census (INE), the municipality has a population of 140 inhabitants.
