= Sobremonte Department =

Sobremonte Department Departamento Sobremonte
- Department
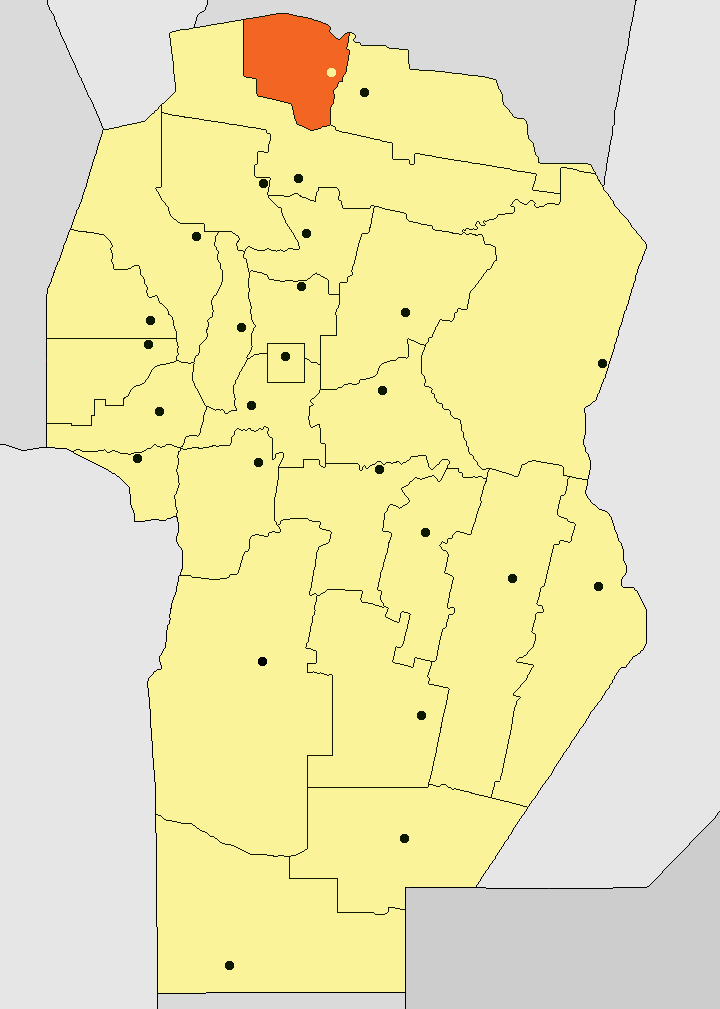
- Location of Sobremonte Department in Córdoba Province
- Coordinates: 29°46′S 63°55′W
- Country: Argentina
- Province: Córdoba
- Capital: San Francisco del Chañar

Area
  - Total: 3,307 km^{2} (1,277 sq mi)

Population (2001 census [INDEC])
  - Total: 4,531
  - Density: 1.370/km^{2} (3.549/sq mi)
  - Pop. change (1991-2001): +7.98%
- Time zone: UTC-3 (ART)
- Postal code: X5209
- Dialing code: 03522
- Distances to
- Buenos Aires: 930 km (580 mi)
- Córdoba: 207 km (129 mi)

Sobremonte Department is a department of Córdoba Province in Argentina.

The provincial subdivision has a population of about 4,531 inhabitants in an area of 3,307 km², and its capital city is San Francisco del Chañar, which is located around 930 km from Buenos Aires.

== Settlements ==
- Caminiaga
- Chuña Huasi
- Pozo Nuevo
- San Francisco del Chañar
