= Río Seco Department =

Río Seco Department Departamento Río Seco
- Department
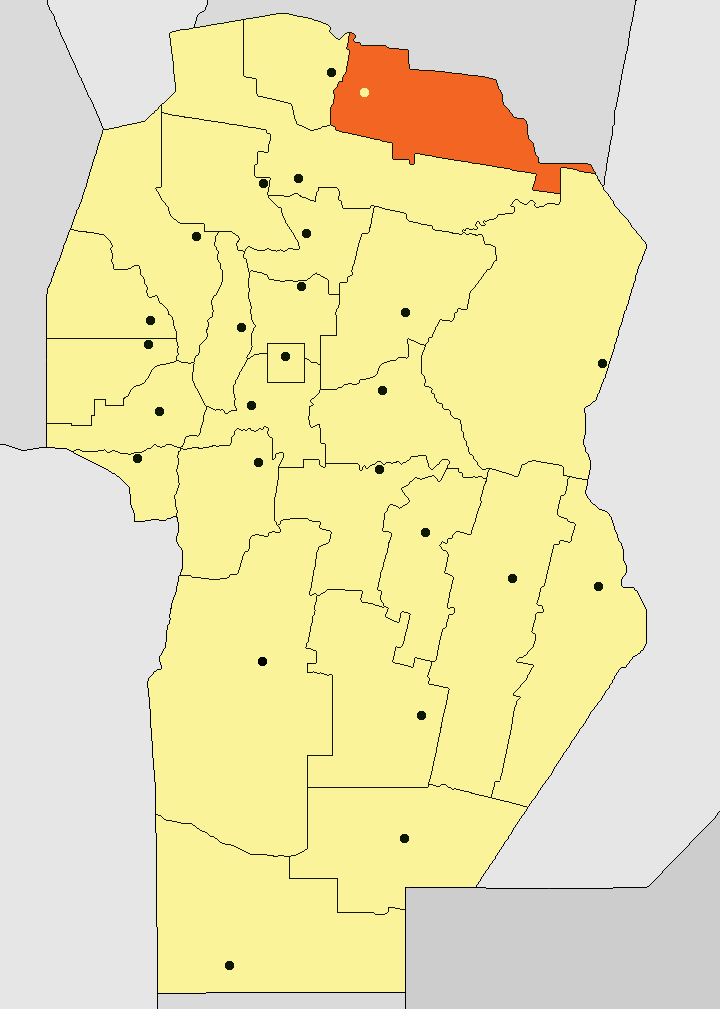
- Location of Río Seco Department in Córdoba Province
- Coordinates: 29°53′S 63°43′W
- Country: Argentina
- Province: Córdoba
- Capital: Villa de María del Río Seco

Area
  - Total: 6,754 km^{2} (2,608 sq mi)

Population (2001 census [INDEC])
  - Total: 12,635
  - Density: 1.871/km^{2} (4.845/sq mi)
  - Pop. change (1991-2001): 19.25
- Time zone: UTC-3 (ART)
- Postal code: X5248
- Dialing code: 03522
- Distances to
- Buenos Aires: ?
- Córdoba: 144 km (89 mi)

Río Seco Department is a department of Córdoba Province in Argentina.

The provincial subdivision has a population of about 12,635 inhabitants in an area of 6,754 km², and its capital city is Villa de María del Río Seco.

== Settlements ==
- Cerro Colorado
- Chañar Viejo
- Eufrasio Loza
- Gutemberg
- La Rinconada
- Los Hoyos
- Puesto de Castro
- Rayo Cortado
- Santa Elena
- Sebastián Elcano
- Villa Candelaria Norte
- Villa de María del Río Seco
