= Villa de María del Río Seco =

- Town
- Location of Villa de María del Río Seco in Argentina
- Coordinates: 29°53′S 63°43′W
- Country: Argentina
- Province: Córdoba
- Department: Río Seco

Government
  - Intendant: José Luis Arce

Population
  - Total: 3,819
- Time zone: UTC−3 (ART)
- CPA base: X5248
- Dialing code: +54 3522

Villa de María del Río Seco (usually shortened to Villa de María, not to be confused with Villa María) is a town in the province of Córdoba, Argentina. It has 3,819 inhabitants per the 2001 census [INDEC], and is the head town of the Río Seco Department. It lies in the north of the province, by National Route 9, about 27 km (17 mi) south of the provincial border with Santiago del Estero and 170 km (106 mi) north-northeast of the provincial capital Córdoba.

Villa de María was founded in 1796 or 1797 by the Marquis Rafael de Sobremonte (then to be Viceroy of the Río de la Plata), with the name of Río Seco. Its name was changed to the current one by provincial governor Roque Ferreira on 26 May 1858.

The town was the birthplace of the poet Leopoldo Lugones (1874–1938), whose childhood house is today a museum and a National Historic Monument. The area was also the stage of the assassination of the caudillo of Entre Ríos Province Francisco Ramírez, in 1821.

== Climate ==
Climate data for Villa de María del Río Seco (1981–2010, extremes 1961–present)
Month	Jan	Feb	Mar	Apr	May	Jun	Jul	Aug	Sep	Oct	Nov	Dec	Year
Record high °C (°F)	44.6 (112.3)	43.0 (109.4)	40.6 (105.1)	37.8 (100.0)	35.0 (95.0)	32.6 (90.7)	35.2 (95.4)	38.4 (101.1)	40.0 (104.0)	42.8 (109.0)	42.8 (109.0)	43.0 (109.4)	44.6 (112.3)
Mean daily maximum °C (°F)	31.4 (88.5)	29.8 (85.6)	28.1 (82.6)	24.3 (75.7)	21.3 (70.3)	18.7 (65.7)	18.7 (65.7)	21.6 (70.9)	23.6 (74.5)	27.1 (80.8)	29.1 (84.4)	30.9 (87.6)	25.4 (77.7)
Daily mean °C (°F)	24.0 (75.2)	22.4 (72.3)	21.0 (69.8)	17.3 (63.1)	14.0 (57.2)	11.2 (52.2)	10.5 (50.9)	12.9 (55.2)	15.3 (59.5)	19.2 (66.6)	21.4 (70.5)	23.4 (74.1)	17.7 (63.9)
Mean daily minimum °C (°F)	17.4 (63.3)	16.5 (61.7)	15.5 (59.9)	12.0 (53.6)	8.5 (47.3)	5.5 (41.9)	3.5 (38.3)	5.5 (41.9)	7.9 (46.2)	11.7 (53.1)	14.2 (57.6)	16.8 (62.2)	11.3 (52.3)
Record low °C (°F)	6.7 (44.1)	4.4 (39.9)	0.1 (32.2)	−1.1 (30.0)	−6.9 (19.6)	−8.4 (16.9)	−10.5 (13.1)	−9.2 (15.4)	−6.2 (20.8)	−2.2 (28.0)	0.6 (33.1)	3.6 (38.5)	−10.5 (13.1)
Average precipitation mm (inches)	130.6 (5.14)	119.7 (4.71)	134.5 (5.30)	70.4 (2.77)	21.3 (0.84)	8.4 (0.33)	12.5 (0.49)	6.7 (0.26)	27.1 (1.07)	62.6 (2.46)	89.0 (3.50)	130.2 (5.13)	813.0 (32.01)
Average precipitation days (≥ 0.1 mm)	9.9	9.1	9.4	7.6	4.4	3.3	2.7	1.6	3.6	6.6	8.7	9.6	76.5
Average relative humidity (%)	74.7	79.7	81.8	82.1	79.0	76.7	71.8	66.3	64.7	67.5	70.4	72.5	73.9
Source: Servicio Meteorológico Nacional

== Notable people ==
- Leopoldo Lugones, poet (1874-1938)
- Renzo Saravia footballer (1993)
