= Villa Dolores =

- City
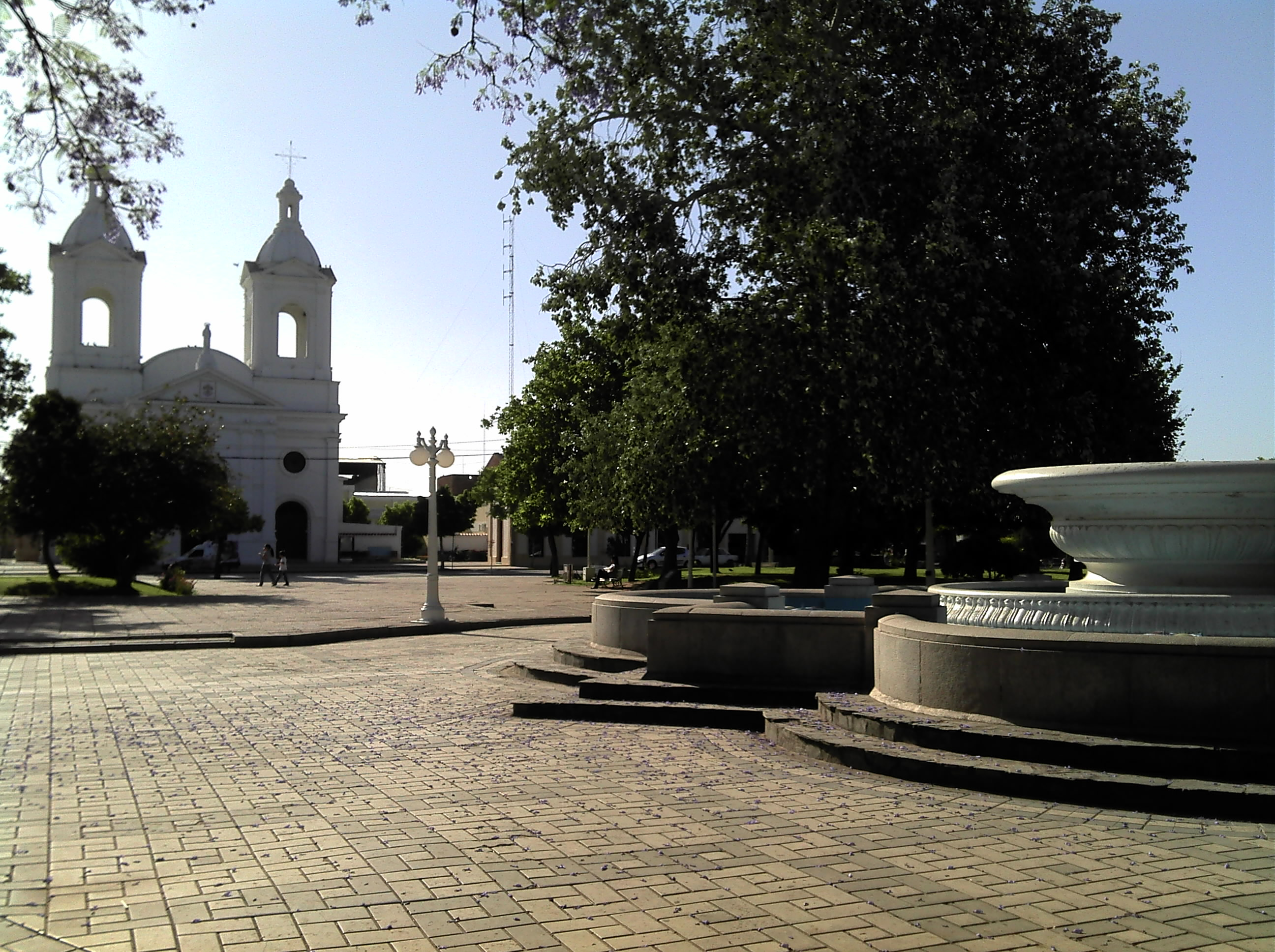

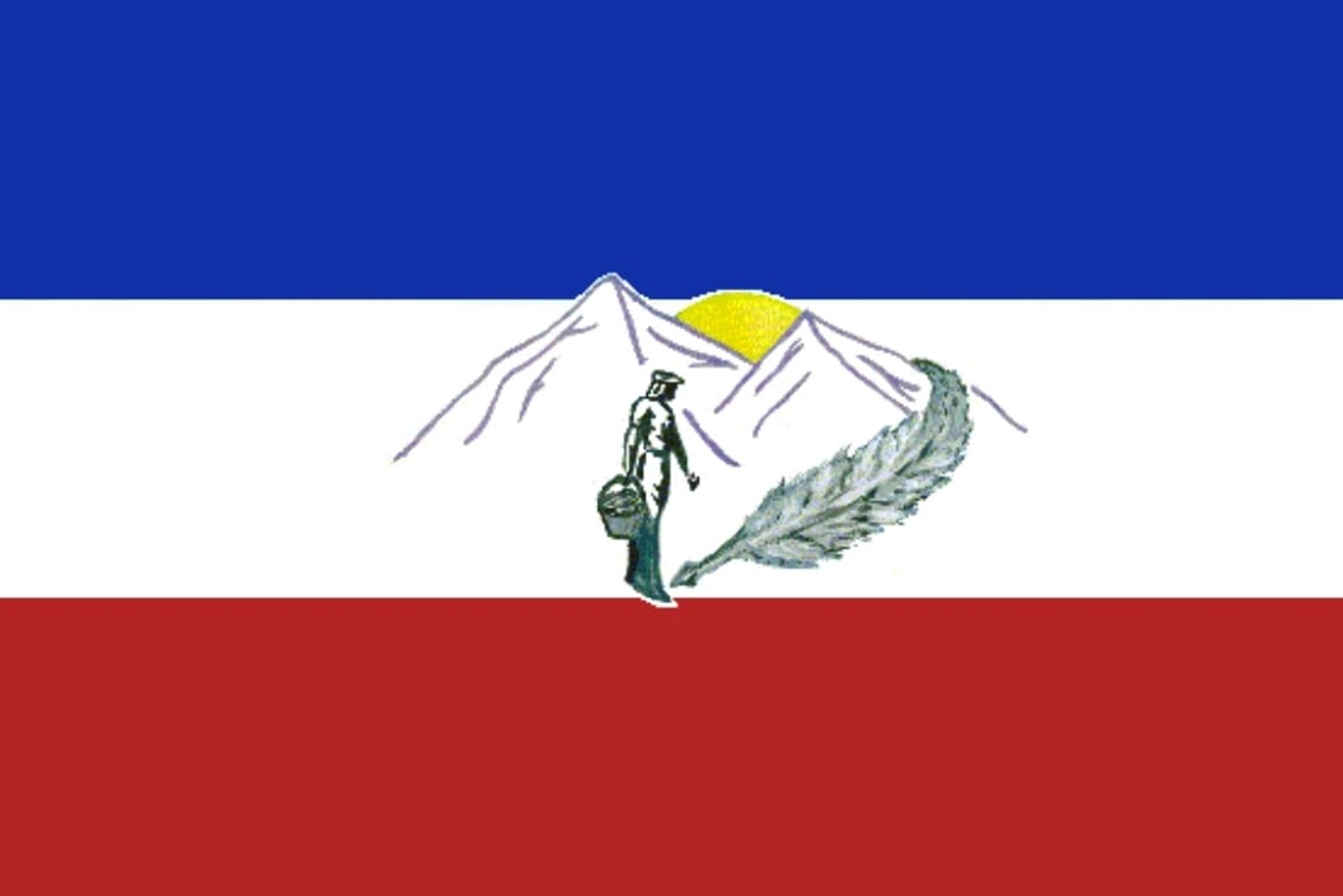
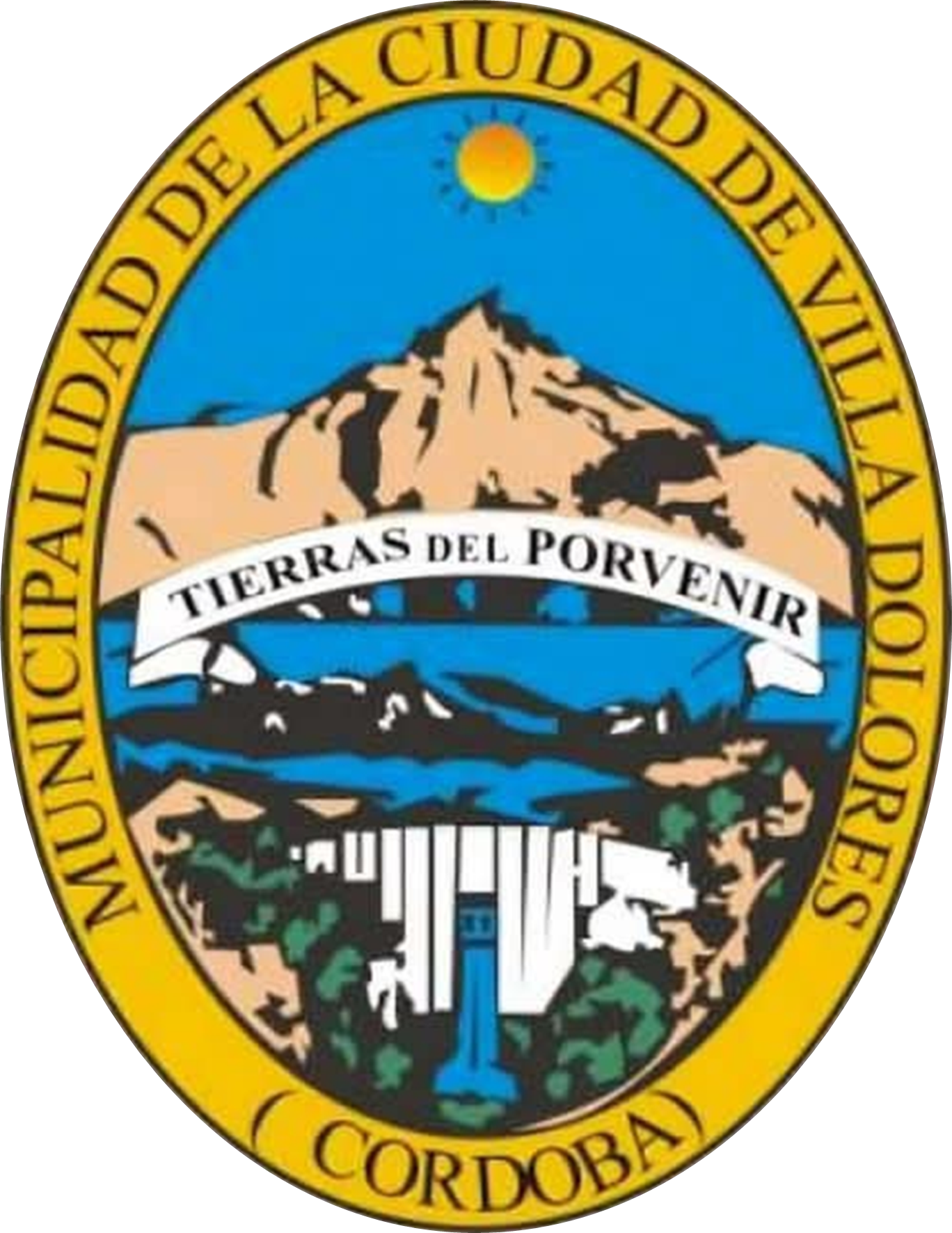
- Flag Coat of arms

- Location of Villa Dolores in Argentina
- Coordinates: 31°56′S 65°12′W
- Country: Argentina
- Province: Córdoba
- Department: San Javier
- Founded: April 21, 1853

Government
  - Intendant: Maximiliano Rivarola
- Elevation: 584 m (1,916 ft)

Population (2010 census)
  - Total: 29,854
- Demonym: Dolorense
- Time zone: UTC−3 (ART)
- CPA base: X5870
- Dialing code: +54 3544
- Website: Official website

Villa Dolores is a city in the province of Córdoba, Argentina, located in the southwestern side of the province. It has a population of 29,854 inhabitants.

Although it is one of the smallest cities in Córdoba, many other provinces rely on Villa Dolores for its major export in potatoes. Wine consumption is also a large trait in this town having its own import route from the capital city of wine in Argentina, Mendoza.

== Climate ==
Climate data for Villa Dolores (1991–2020, extremes 1961–present)
Month	Jan	Feb	Mar	Apr	May	Jun	Jul	Aug	Sep	Oct	Nov	Dec	Year
Record high °C (°F)	43.4 (110.1)	41.2 (106.2)	38.2 (100.8)	36.0 (96.8)	31.1 (88.0)	30.1 (86.2)	33.0 (91.4)	37.0 (98.6)	39.5 (103.1)	42.0 (107.6)	41.2 (106.2)	43.1 (109.6)	43.4 (110.1)
Mean daily maximum °C (°F)	32.7 (90.9)	31.0 (87.8)	28.8 (83.8)	24.8 (76.6)	20.9 (69.6)	18.4 (65.1)	18.1 (64.6)	21.6 (70.9)	24.6 (76.3)	27.9 (82.2)	30.4 (86.7)	32.2 (90.0)	26.0 (78.8)
Daily mean °C (°F)	25.4 (77.7)	23.8 (74.8)	21.8 (71.2)	17.8 (64.0)	13.9 (57.0)	10.7 (51.3)	10.0 (50.0)	13.0 (55.4)	16.3 (61.3)	20.1 (68.2)	22.8 (73.0)	24.7 (76.5)	18.4 (65.1)
Mean daily minimum °C (°F)	18.4 (65.1)	17.4 (63.3)	16.0 (60.8)	12.7 (54.9)	9.0 (48.2)	5.6 (42.1)	4.4 (39.9)	6.5 (43.7)	9.2 (48.6)	12.8 (55.0)	15.4 (59.7)	17.4 (63.3)	12.1 (53.8)
Record low °C (°F)	5.5 (41.9)	4.9 (40.8)	2.8 (37.0)	−4.5 (23.9)	−5.1 (22.8)	−6.7 (19.9)	−8.9 (16.0)	−10.0 (14.0)	−3.9 (25.0)	−0.2 (31.6)	−1.0 (30.2)	5.7 (42.3)	−10.0 (14.0)
Average precipitation mm (inches)	111.3 (4.38)	108.3 (4.26)	93.0 (3.66)	49.8 (1.96)	18.4 (0.72)	6.7 (0.26)	6.7 (0.26)	4.7 (0.19)	19.9 (0.78)	41.9 (1.65)	77.3 (3.04)	102.7 (4.04)	640.7 (25.22)
Average precipitation days (≥ 0.1 mm)	9.8	9.4	8.3	6.5	3.9	2.2	1.8	1.7	3.5	5.4	8.7	10.1	71.3
Average snowy days	0.0	0.0	0.0	0.0	0.1	0.1	0.1	0.0	0.0	0.0	0.0	0.0	0.2
Average relative humidity (%)	58.6	64.9	68.9	71.4	72.9	69.8	62.6	51.5	48.4	50.8	52.1	55.3	60.6
Mean monthly sunshine hours	288.3	276.9	241.8	228.0	201.5	180.0	201.5	238.7	234.0	260.4	282.0	272.8	2,905.9
Percentage possible sunshine	67	73	63	67	62	59	62	70	65	66	68	62	65
Source 1: Servicio Meteorológico Nacional
Source 2: UNLP (sun only 1971–1980)

== Tourism ==
Tourism in Villa Dolores peaks during the high season (January - February). Villa Dolores is known for its peaceful environment and views of the Cordoba mountain range. It is also known for its hidden rivers that run freshwater streams from the mountain tops, including the stream known as "La Piedra Pintada".
