= Marquis of Sobremonte provincial historical museum =

Coordinates: 31°25′28″S 64°10′52″W

- Museo Histórico Provincial Marqués de Sobremonte
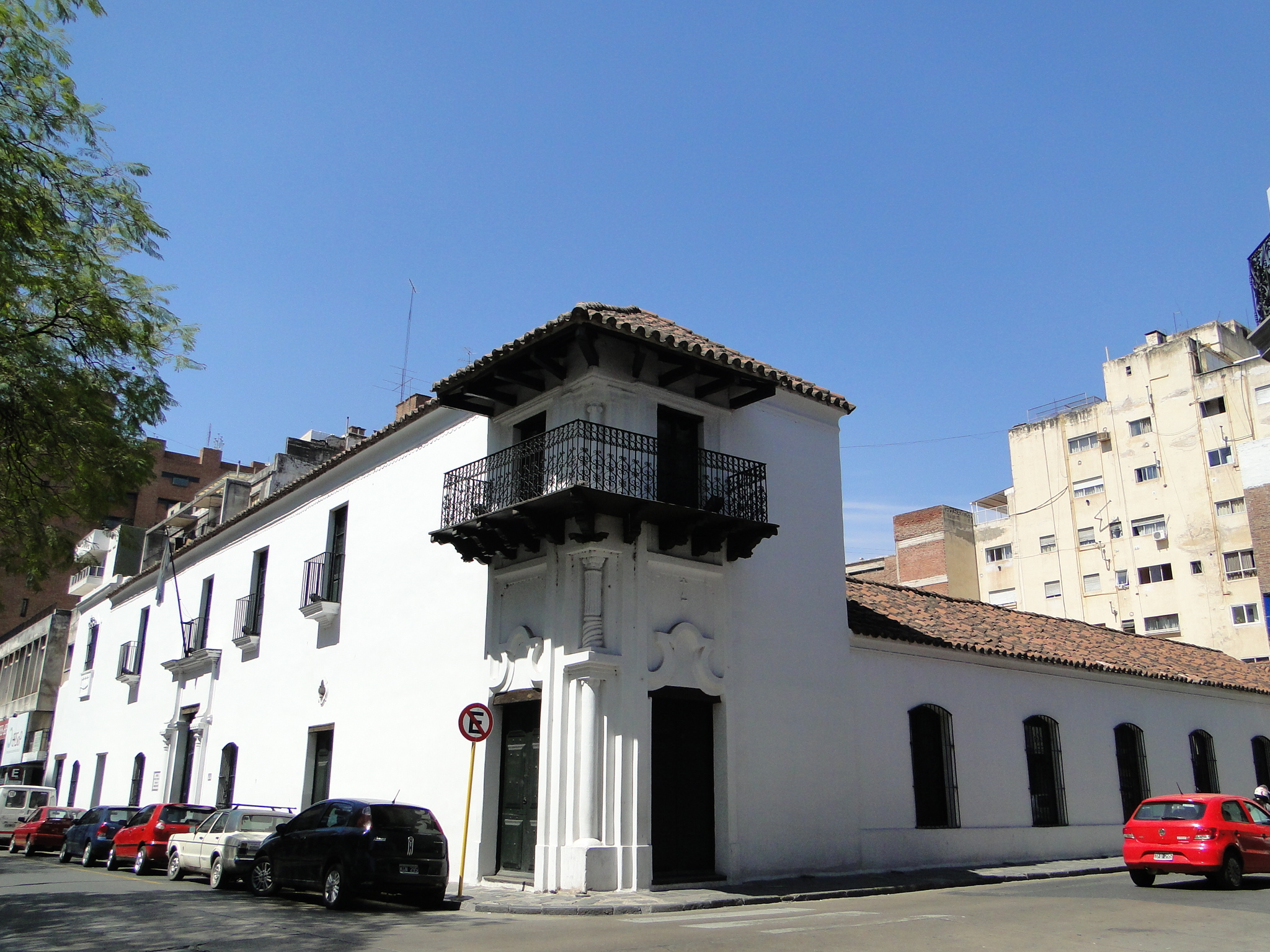
- Exterior view of the museum
- Interactive map of the Marquis of Sobremonte provincial historical museum area

General information
- Type: Museum
- Architectural style: Colonial
- Location: Rosario de Santa Fe 218, Córdoba, Argentina
- Construction started: 1752
- Completed: 1772

The Marquis of Sobremonte provincial historical museum (Spanish: Museo Histórico Provincial Marqués de Sobremonte) is a museum located in Córdoba, Argentina. It is named after Rafael de Sobremonte, 3rd Marquis of Sobremonte, who lived there during his administration of the city, during the 18th century.

== Description ==
The museum is located in the commercial area of Córdoba, and it keeps the urban architecture of colonial times. It was used for both domestic and commercial purposes back then, and it is the only house of the time period kept in modern Córdoba. For this reason, and the cultural things kept in it, it was declared a national and provincial historical museum. The walls were made with lime, the masonry used adobe, and used colonial roof tiles. The floor is made of creole tiles in the inside, and boulder in the courtyards.

== History ==
The house was built by José Rodríguez in 1752, taking 20 years to finish construction. Rafael de Sobremonte lived in the house from 1783 to 1796, during his administration as mayor of the Córdoba del Tucumán.
