= Córdoba Province, Argentina =

Province of Argentina

Coordinates: 31°25′S 64°11′W

Córdoba
- Province
- Province of Córdoba; Provincia de Córdoba (Spanish)
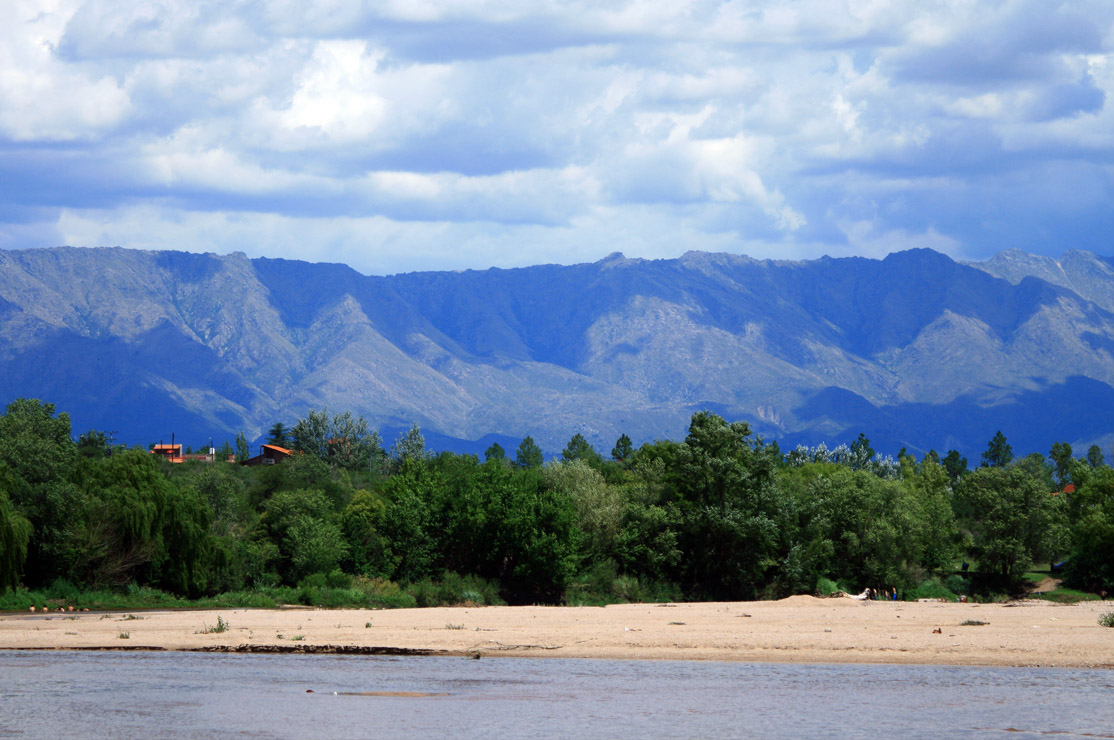
- The Traslasierra Valley

- Flag Coat of arms

- Location of Córdoba within Argentina
- Country: Argentina
- Capital: Córdoba
- Departments: 26
- Municipalities and communes: 427

Government
  - Governor: Martín Llaryora (PJ/HPC)
  - Vice Governor: Myrian Prunotto
  - Legislature: 70
  - National Deputies: 18
  - National Senators: Carmen Álvarez (PRO); Luis Juez (PRO); Alejandra Vigo (HPC)

Area Ranked 5th
  - Total: 165,321 km^{2} (63,831 sq mi)

Population (2022 census)
  - Total: 3,840,905
  - Rank: 2nd
  - Density: 23.2330/km^{2} (60.1732/sq mi)
- Demonym(s): cordobés, córdoban

GDP
  - Total: peso 1,582 billion (US$34 billion) (2019)
- Time zone: UTC−3 (ART)
- ISO 3166 code: AR-X
- HDI (2021): 0.841 very high (13th)
- Website: www.cba.gov.ar

Córdoba (Spanish pronunciation: [ˈkoɾðoβa]) is a province of Argentina, located in the center of the country. Its neighboring provinces are (clockwise from the north) Santiago del Estero, Santa Fe, Buenos Aires, La Pampa, San Luis, La Rioja, and Catamarca. Together with Santa Fe and Entre Ríos, the province is part of the economic and political association known as the Center Region.

Córdoba is the second-most populous Argentine province, with 3,840,905 inhabitants, and the fifth by size, at about 165,321 km^{2} (63,831 sq mi). Almost 41% of its inhabitants reside in the capital city, Córdoba, and its surroundings, making it the second most populous metro area in Argentina.

== History ==
Before the Spanish conquista the region now called Córdoba Province was inhabited by indigenous groups, most notably the Comechingones and Sanavirones.

Once settled in Upper Peru, the Spaniards searched for a route to the Río de la Plata port in the Atlantic Ocean to transport the Peruvian gold and silver to Europe.

Córdoba de la Nueva Andalucía (nowadays the city of Córdoba) was founded as a middle point on that route on July 6, 1573 by Jerónimo Luis de Cabrera. The Colegio Convictorio de Nuestra Señora de Monserrat was founded by the Jesuits in 1599, followed by the National University of Córdoba, Argentina's first university, in 1613. The city continued to grow as an important cultural center, supported by the trade of precious metals from Peru. In 1761 a printing press was installed in the University.

In 1783, seven years after the consolidation of the Viceroyalty of the Río de la Plata, the Intendency of Córdoba became the capital of what now includes the La Rioja, Mendoza, San Juan, and San Luis Provinces, dividing the former Tucumán Intendency in two. Rafael de Sobremonte was its first governor, when Córdoba City had 38,800 inhabitants.

After the May Revolution in 1810, Governor Juan Gutiérrez de la Concha joined a meeting that decided to ignore the authority of the Buenos Aires Junta. Francisco Ortiz de Ocampo attacked the city and executed the leaders of the opposition, among whom was Santiago de Liniers, leader of the resistance during the British invasions of the Río de la Plata.

Led by Juan Bautista Bustos after 1820, Córdoba struggled for control of the nation with Buenos Aires; the United Provinces of South America had neither legislative nor executive branches at the time. Córdoba sought a federal organization of the provinces while Rivadavia pushed for a centralised government in Buenos Aires. For 15 years, the province was submerged in internal revolts that started to stabilize in 1868 under the provisional government of Félix de la Peña.

During the presidency of Sarmiento an astronomic observatory (1871) and the Faculty of Physical Sciences and Mathematics (1873) were inaugurated.

The creation of the railways and the consequent immigration brought a second wave of population growth to Córdoba. From 1887 on, several agricultural colonies (San Francisco, Marcos Juárez, etc.) emerged, while former rest-point Fraile Muerto (Bell Ville), Ferreira (Villa María) and Los Luceros (Río Segundo), on the route to Buenos Aires, became agricultural, commercial and industrial centers, respectively.

The University Reform movement, which originated in Córdoba in 1918, was influential not only in Argentina but throughout South America. Modernization of the curricular contents and the improvement of the students' rights were the main achievements of the movement and in Córdoba, and were largely enacted by Governor Amadeo Sabattini, who became Argentina's most progressive governor at the time and enacted civil and land reforms that would later set the national standard.

After World War II, many foreign workers and workers from other provinces in Argentina were attracted to Córdoba's industrial development, led by the expansion of the car industry. It was during Arturo Frondizi's presidency (1958–1962) that most new auto industries settled in the city of Córdoba and its surroundings.

As in the rest of the country, Peronist groups emerged in 1955 following the coup that removed Juan Perón from office. These Peronist groups, together with other socialist and anarchist groups, began opposing Argentina's third military dictatorship that began in 1966. Worker and student participation in politics grew due to the widespread discontent with the appointed governor's hard-line stance, culminating in the violent May, 1969, popular revolt known as the Cordobazo. This revolt, mirrored by the Rosariazo and others in several parts of the country, undermined the power of dictator Juan Carlos Onganía and ultimately led to his ouster by more moderate military factions.

Córdoba has continued to prosper, despite left-wing violence in 1973, right-wing political interference in 1974, government atrocities in 1976–77, 1978–81 free trade policies that battered Córdoba's sizable industrial sector, the 1980s debt crisis and, the recent acute financial crisis that ended in 2002.

== Geography ==
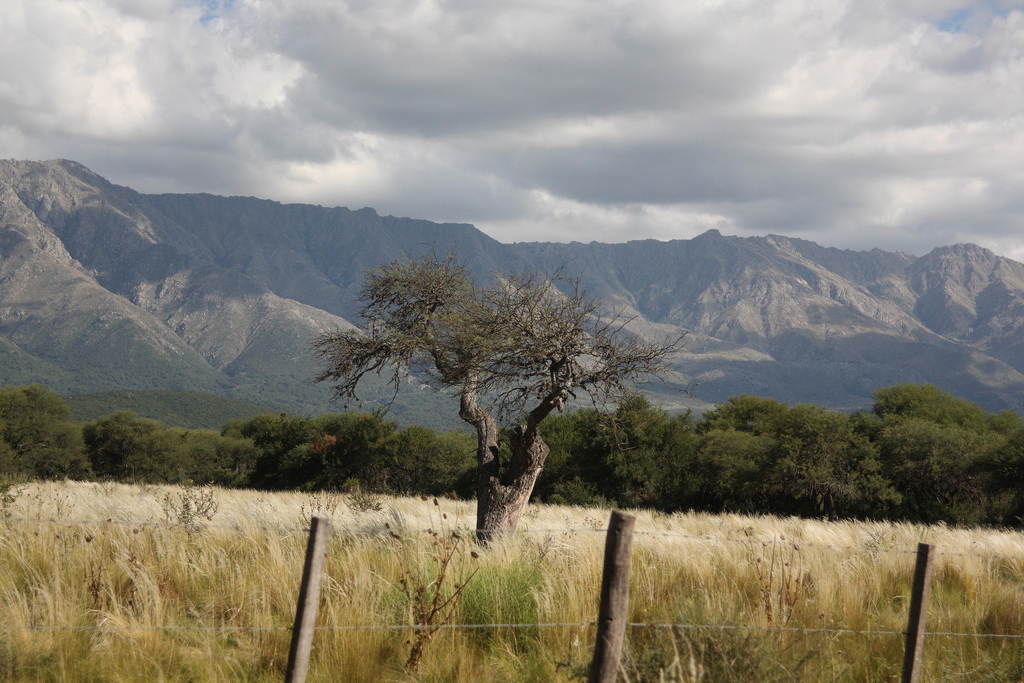
The Sierras de Córdoba.

Córdoba, located just north of the geographical center of the nation, is Argentina's fifth-largest province. The main feature of the province is the presence of an extensive plain covering the eastern two-thirds of the province and the existence of three major mountain ranges, which, combined, are known as Sierras de Córdoba: the easternmost range starts just west of the city of Córdoba and reaches altitudes of mostly around 1,000 meters (3,300 feet) in the southern portion and over 1,500 meters (4,900 feet) further north, with a maximum altitude of 1,950 meters (6,400 feet) at Cerro Uritorco. West of this chain, two valleys contain most of the tourist spots in the province: the Calamuchita valley in the south and the Punilla Valley in the north, home of scenic towns such as Villa Carlos Paz, Cosquín, La Cumbre, and La Falda.

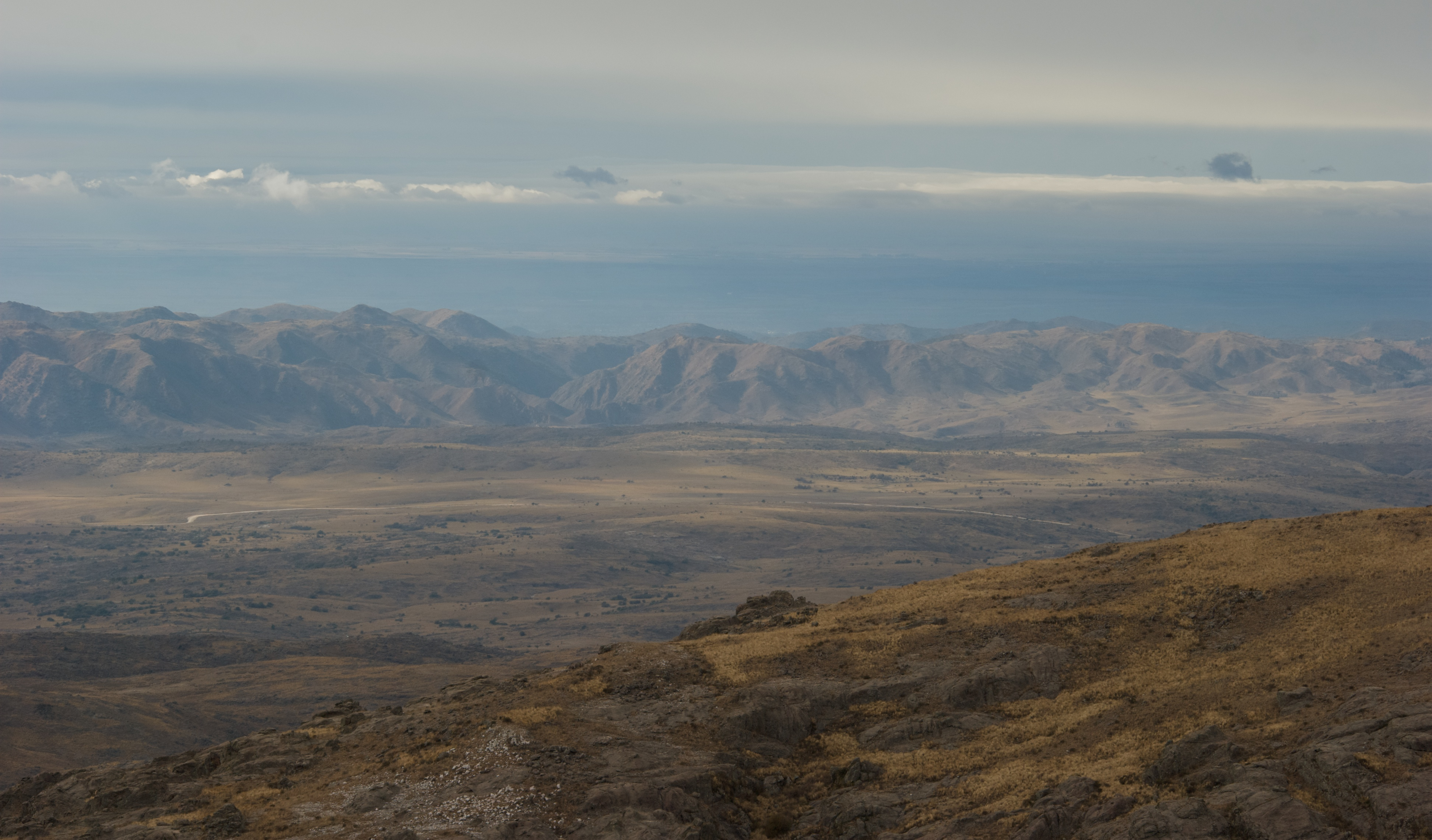
The Quebrada del Condorito National Park.

West of these valleys, the Sierras Grandes form the highest chain in the province: their altitude increases gradually to form a plateau of 2,000 to 2,300 meters (6,600 to 7,500 ft) known as Pampa de Achala, culminating with Cerro Champaqui on the western part, at 2,790 meters (9,150 feet). West of these mountains, there is an impressive drop towards the valley known as Valle de Traslasierra, and across the valley, the Sierras Orientales reach an altitude of 1,650 meters (5,410 feet) at Cerro Yerba Buena. In the northeast corner of the province, a natural depression forms an extensive salt lake called Mar Chiquita Lake. The actual surface of the lake is 6,000 km^{2} (2,300 sq mi), but during extended dry periods (such as in the 1980s) it can be a third of that, with much higher salinity. The southeastern part of the province is home to numerous ponds, lakes, and wetlands.

Köppen climate map of Córdoba.

The climate of the province is predominantly temperate, with some regional variations. Generally speaking, summers are hot and humid, falls are pleasant, winters are extremely dry with strong variations in temperature, and springs are windy and variable. The eastern part of the province experiences summer average high temperatures between 30 and 32 °C (86 and 90 °F) and lows of 16 to 18 °C (61 to 64 °F), with frequent thunderstorms and heat waves with temperatures higher than 38 °C (100 °F) alternating with periods of much drier, pleasant weather following cold fronts. Monthly precipitation during this season ranges from 90 to 120 mm (3.5 to 4.7 in). Nights are noticeably cooler in March, which is also the rainiest month, and April often brings very pleasant weather with highs around 23 °C (73 °F) and lows around 11 °C (52 °F). Starting in May, rainfall is low, with less than 25 mm (0.98 in) monthly during the winter. Frost arrives in late April in the south, and late May in the north.

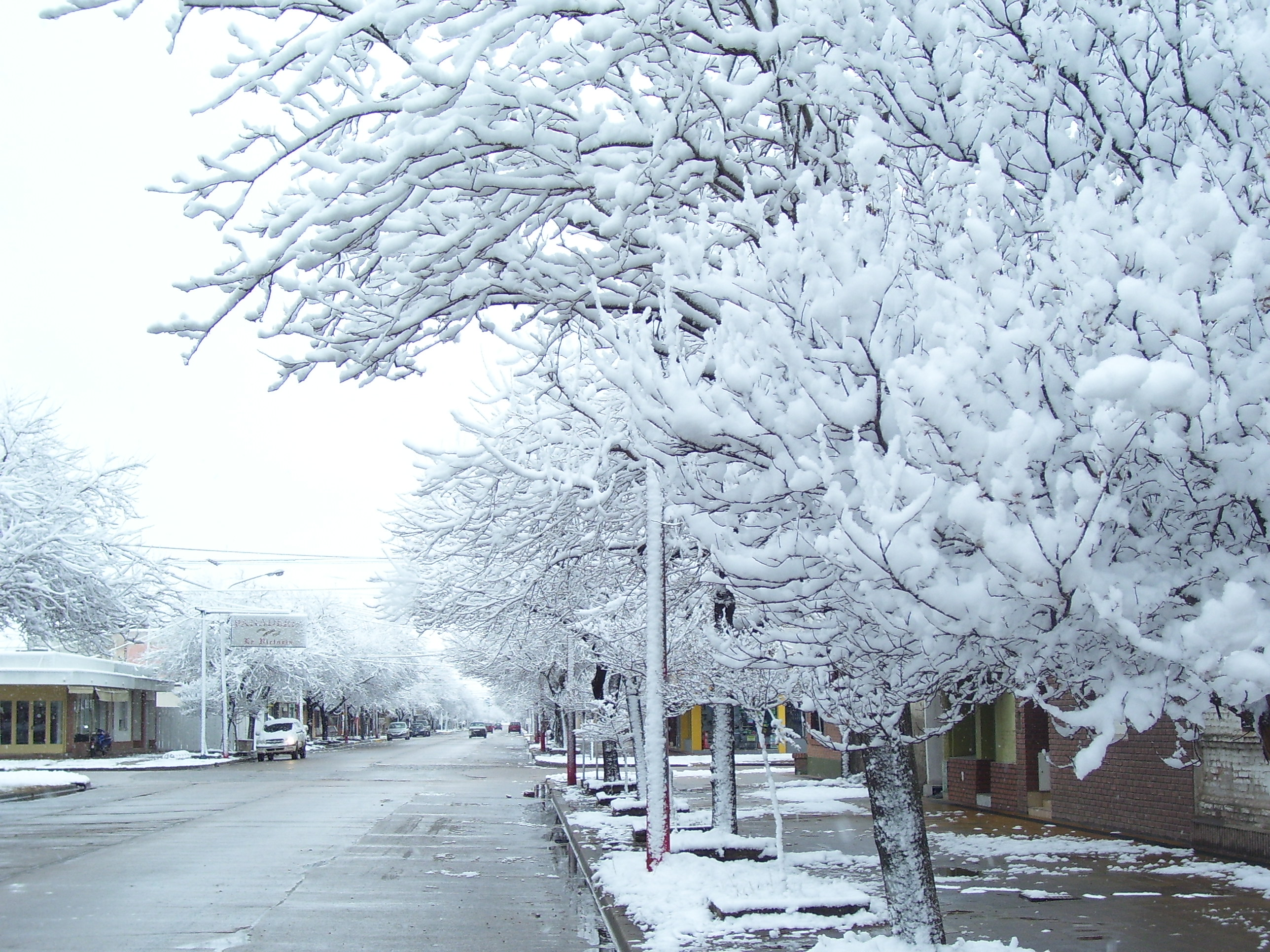
Snowfall in La Carlota south of the Province of Córdoba.

Winter temperatures average a high of 15 to 18 °C (59 to 64 °F) and lows of 2 to 4 °C (36 to 39 °F), but marked variations are possible: northerly winds can push values up to 30 °C (86 °F) and southerly winds can keep afternoon temperatures at 6 °C (43 °F) and bring nighttime temperatures to −5 °C (23 °F). The air is often humid in winter, and thick fog is very common. Snowfall is very rare, almost unheard of in the northeast, but snowstorms can occur: in 2007, between 10 and 20 cm (4 and 8 in) covered a significant part of the region, and temperatures plummeted to -9 °C in most areas (16F). Spring is very variable, alternating between very intense heat waves and cool weather periods with severe thunderstorms, hail and strong winds. Total precipitation is over 850 mm (33 in) along the border with Santa Fe and diminishes to about 700 mm (28 in) in the west, reaching a minimum of about 600 mm (24 in) in the southernmost part of the province. This climate allows eastern Córdoba to be the nation's main producer of soybeans and peanuts, and a large producer of maize and dairy products.

The foothills of the Sierras are known for their pleasant weather: summer days are slightly cooler and the air feels much drier despite high precipitation; winters are much drier with less fog and less wind, and more pleasant sunny days. The eastern slopes of the sierras experience the highest precipitation: usually about 900 mm (35 in), with some spots averaging up to 1,200 mm (47 in) which fall exclusively in the form of very heavy thunderstorms in the summer. Snowfall occurs more frequently in the sierras, but is rarely heavy due to the dryness of the air.

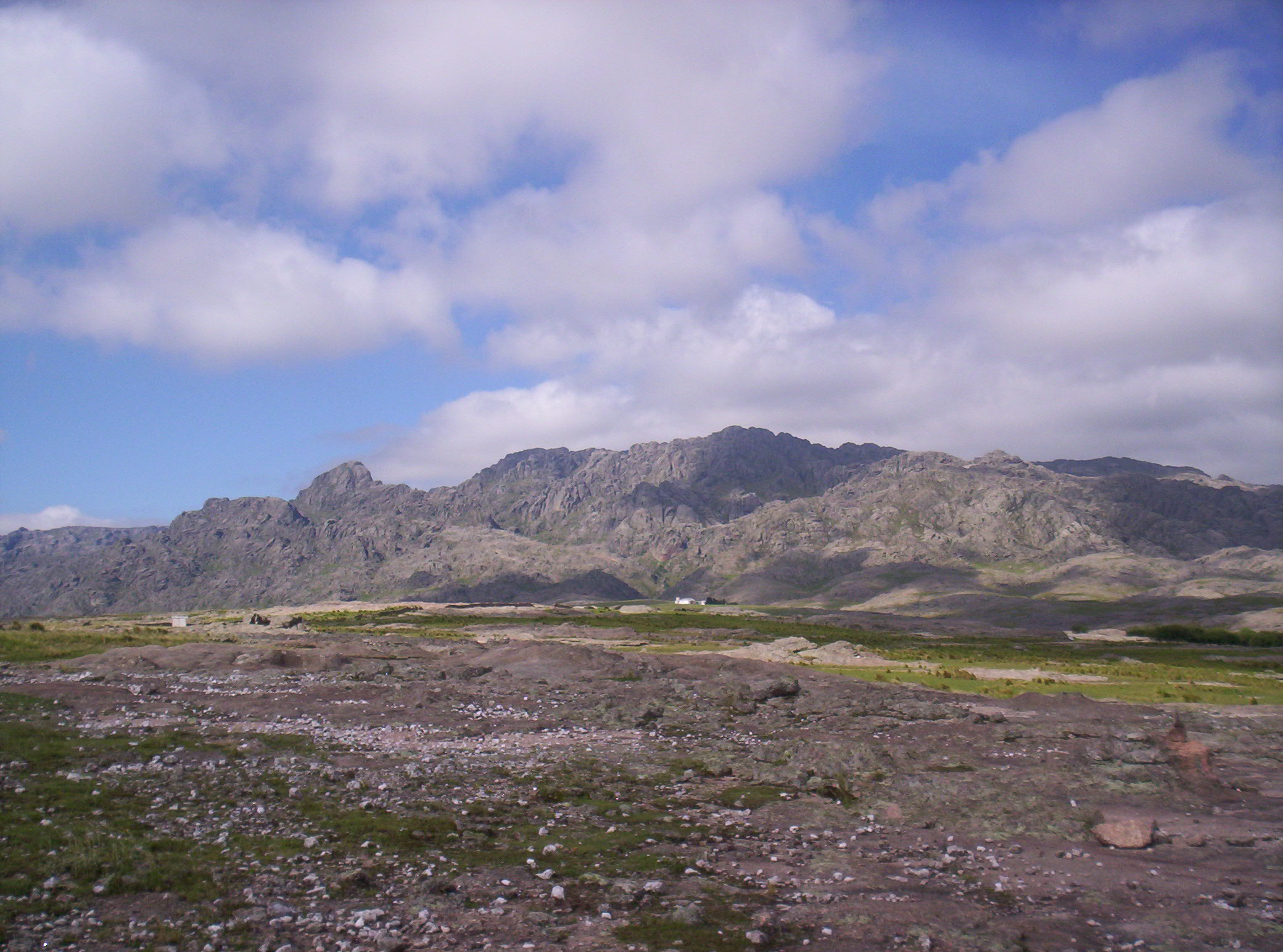
Mount Los Gigantes north of the Pampa de Achala.

The weather in the Pampa de Achala is very variable because of the high altitude: generally speaking, the strong radiation provides pleasant summer afternoons, but temperatures at night can be very cold. Frost can happen throughout the year, and winters are extremely dry with nights well below 0 °C (32 °F). Temperatures well under −15 °C (5 °F) have been recorded, and snowfall is very common but in small quantities due to the lack of precipitation during the colder months. Summer thunderstorms can be very violent, bringing large hail, frequent lightning and high winds.

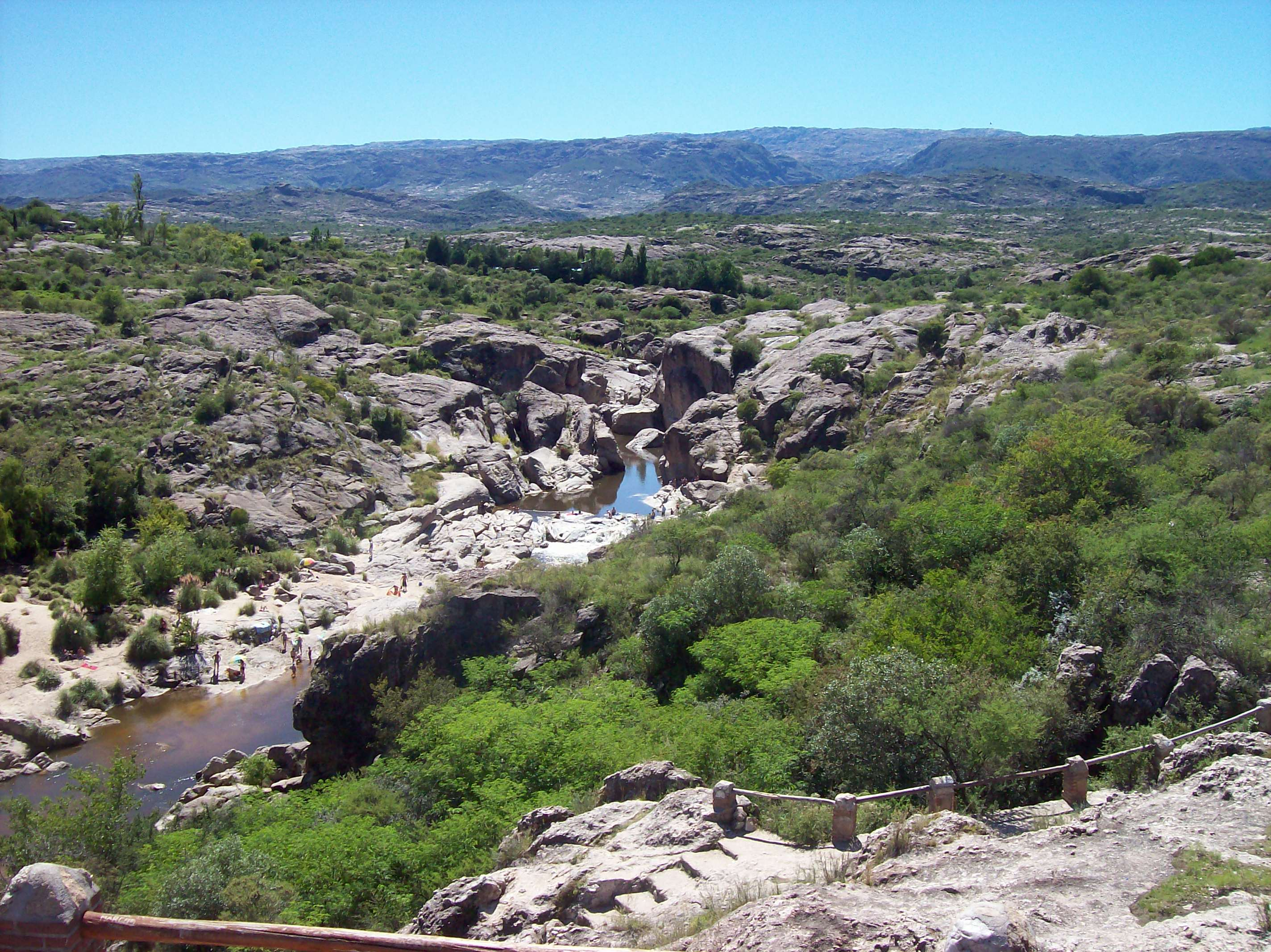
The Mina Clavero River in the Traslasierra Valley.

The region of Traslasierra is known for its markedly warmer climate: summer temperatures often reach well over 35 °C (95 °F) and nights are often very warm. Fall arrives later than elsewhere, and spring arrives earlier as well. Winters are pleasant, with common light frost followed by very pleasant afternoons reaching about 19 °C (66 °F). Precipitation is even more seasonal than in the rest of the province, falling exclusively in the summer and reaching a total of 500 to 700 mm (20 to 28 in). The warmer climate is excellent for the production of Mediterranean agricultural products such as figs, olives and grapes. The extreme northern and northwestern areas of the province are located on the transition between the temperate Pampa and the subtropical Gran Chaco: summers are consistently longer and warmer than in other areas, and extremes of 40 °C (104 °F) are more frequent. Winters are shorter, with night temperatures similar to those further south, but with warmer days. This is the most drought-prone area of the province, with rainfall as little as 400 mm (16 in) annually.

== Demographics ==
Córdoba population pyramid (2022 census)

Ethno-racial groups in Córdoba (2022 census)
1. Undeclared (97.7%)
2. Native (1.80%)
3. Black (0.50%)

According to the 2022 Argentine national census, the Province of Córdoba has 3,840,905 inhabitants.

Evolution of population:

- 1778: 44,506
- 1820: 85,000
- 1847: 90,000
- 1853: 150,000
- 1869: 210,508
- 1895: 351,223
- 1914: 735,472
- 1947: 1,497,987
- 1960: 1,753,840
- 1970: 2,060,065
- 1980: 2,407,754
- 1991: 2,766,683
- 2001: 3,066,801
- 2010: 3,308,876
demographic vertical bar chart of between 1778 and 2010

=== Largest cities ===
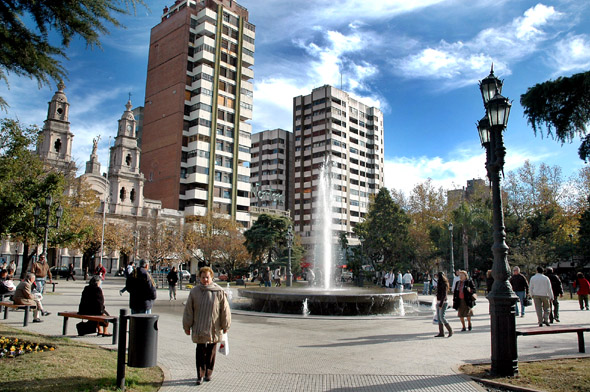
View of Río Cuarto City.

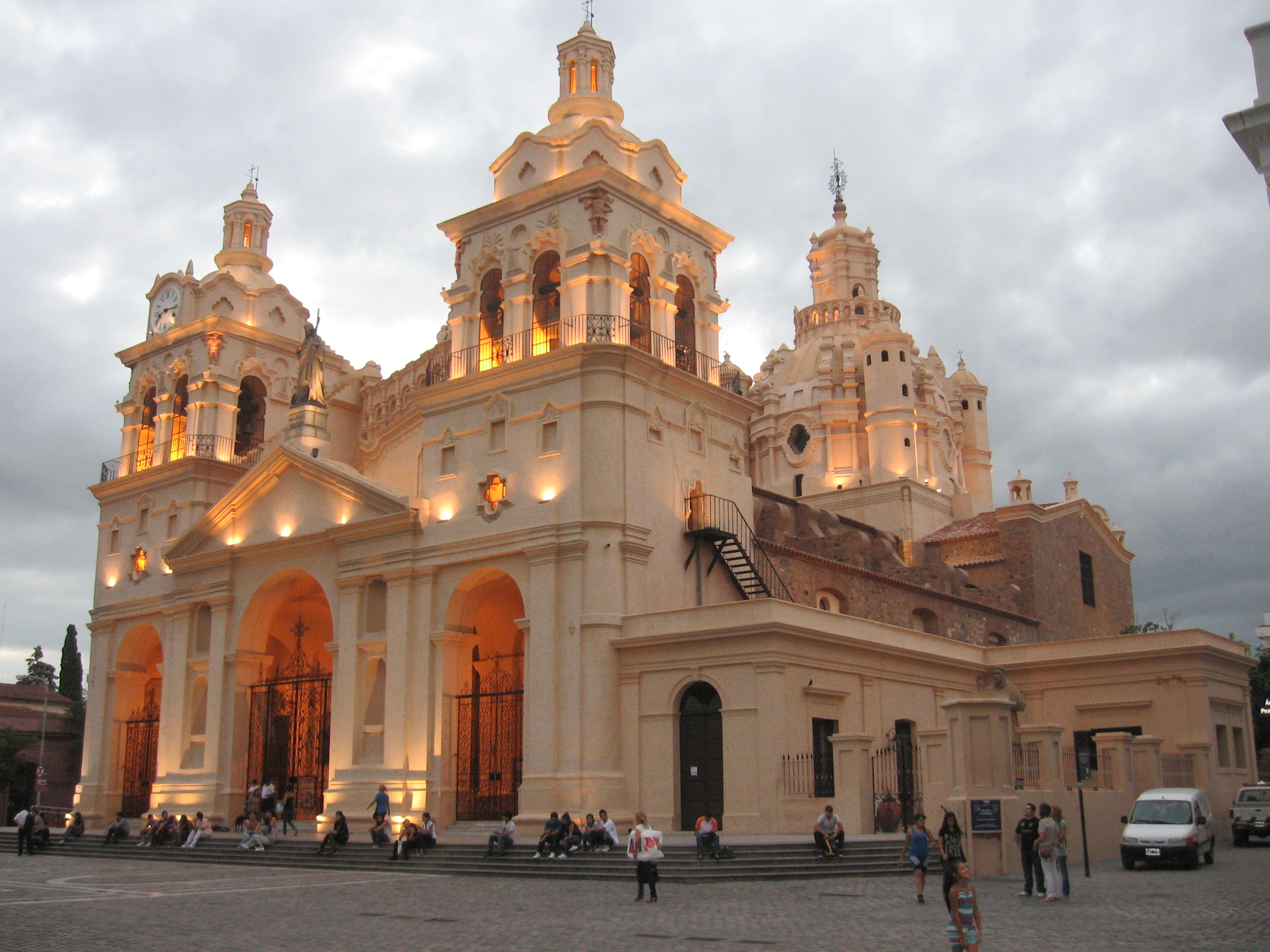
The Cathedral of Córdoba.

Ranking	City	Population (2010)
1	Córdoba	1,417,298
2	Río Cuarto	160,010
3	Villa María	89,000
4	Villa Carlos Paz	62,423
5	San Francisco	61,750
	Cosquín	57,458
6	Alta Gracia	48,140
7	Río Tercero	46,421
8	Bell Ville	40,835
9	La Calera	32,227
10	Villa Dolores	31,850

== Economy ==
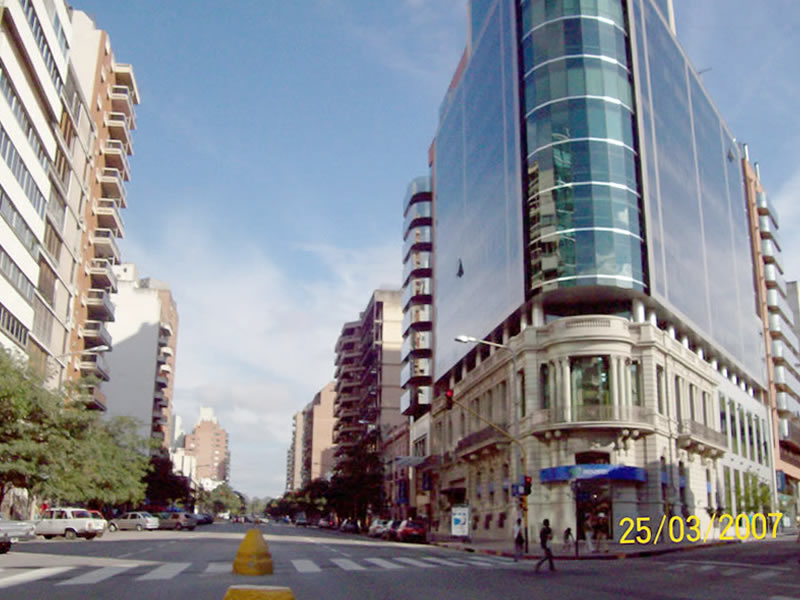
Known nationally for its rich agriculture and industries such as motor vehicles and food processing, Córdoba also enjoys a vigorous services sector.

Córdoba has the second-largest provincial economy in Argentina, behind only the Province of Buenos Aires. In 2013, Córdoba's GDP was estimated at 191.612 billion Pesos (about US$35.0934 billion) or, 55,075 pesos (about US$10,087) per capita.

As in most places, the majority of GDP is produced by services (financial, educational, medical, professional, etc.). Within this sector, major players include Deloitte, Tarjeta Naranja and Bancor (financial services providers headquartered in the provincial capital), the city's various universities, a number of public and private clinics which attract patients both domestically and internationally (medical tourism), construction and engineering companies such as Roggio and Electroingenieria, media groups (La Voz del Interior is the largest Argentine newspaper outside Buenos Aires), retail firms (such as Grupo Dinosaurio) and a large number of small partnerships operating in accounting, law, architecture, etc. In the past, the province had significant call centers, but these have mostly been moved to lower-wage locations.

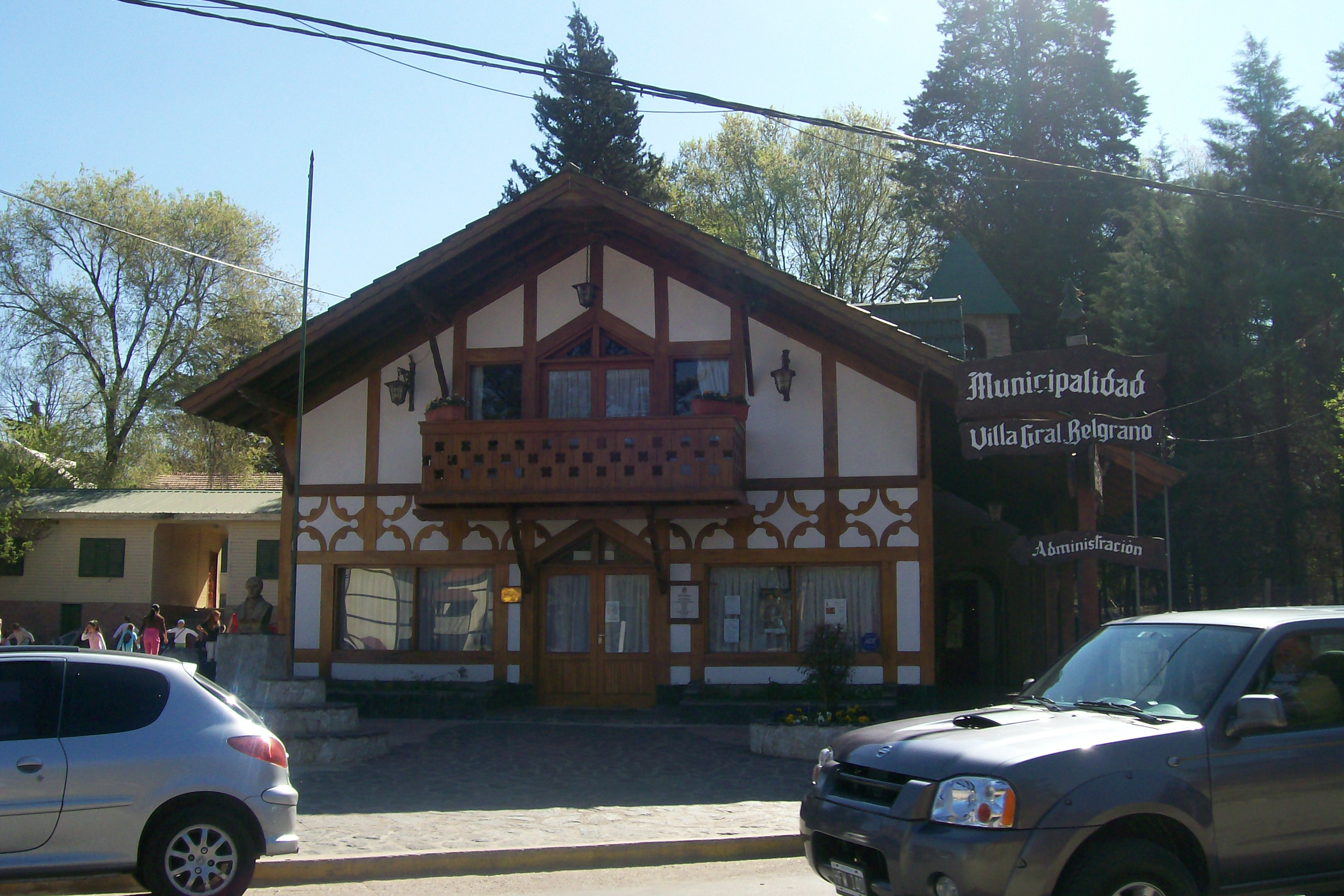
German architecture in Villa General Belgrano.

The province is among the most visited in Argentina (mostly by domestic travelers) because of its hilly landscapes, pleasant weather, "fun" reputation, and cultural offerings. In particular, cities like Villa Carlos Paz, Villa General Belgrano, Cosquín and La Cumbrecita attract a large number of tourists. This supports a large hospitality industry with hotels, restaurants, bars and resorts. Around three million tourists, both foreign and Argentine, visit Córdoba every year. The province has 500,000 hotel beds, including hostels, tourist farms, and other types of accommodation. There are four five-star hotels, of which three are located in Córdoba City (Sheraton Cordoba Hotel, Holiday Inn, Interplaza), and one on the hills at Punilla Valley (El Castillo). Important festivities include the Cosquín National Folk Music Festival, and the Jesús María Folk and Taming Festivals.

Call centers flourished in the province in the past but have mostly been moved to lower-wage locations. They were instead replaced by service centers from technology companies, starting with Motorola several years ago, and many of these have evolved into software and technology development centers. Current players in that industry include Intel, Mercado Libre, Santex, Globant and a vast (and growing) number of small, specialized providers which have organized under the banner of the "Cordoba Technology Cluster". The capital city has been named one of Latin America's major startup ecosystems, with several active angel investors, incubators and a well-educated talent pool supported by local universities.

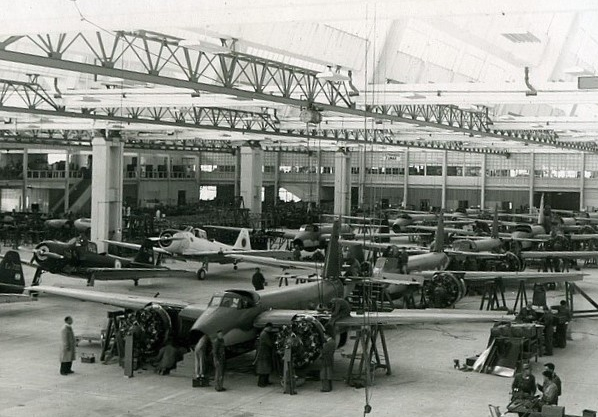
The State Military Industries complex, 1950. Industry in Córdoba has benefited from a skilled workforce and the province's central location.

The installation of the Fábrica Militar de Aviones in 1927, and subsequent state-owned industries (like locomotive and train manufacturing) established Córdoba among the most important industrial centers in Argentina; the facility was purchased by Lockheed Martin in 1995 and has practically ceased production. Beginning around 1955, foreign investment in Córdoba's automotive, agricultural machinery and food processing industries further added to its industrial profile. Currently, Renault and FIAT produce cars in the provincial capital, with additional investments underway from Nissan, Renault and Mercedes-Benz to jointly produce a pickup truck starting in 2017–2018. Volkswagen operates a large manufacturing facility which produces and exports gearboxes. In total, 250 manufacturers of either motor vehicles or auto parts operate in Córdoba, making it Argentina's "motor province". Several facilities produce agricultural machinery (tractors, harvesters, etc.) - these are often located in small and medium cities outside the capital. Chemical manufacturing is centered around Rio Tercero.

Food processing is another strength of the province, with the multinational candy and snack manufacturer Grupo Arcor headquartered in Arroyito and one of the largest oil producers in the world (Aceitera General Deheza, or AGD) headquartered in General Deheza. The cities of Villa Maria and San Francisco are major cheese production centers, while Oncativo and Colonia Caroya are known for the production of sausages and Villa General Belgrano for its beer. Historically, cheap, sweet wine was produced in the north of the province; in the last decade, a number of more sophisticated wineries have found that the province has locations with excellent climate and soil for wine production (especially in hilly areas).

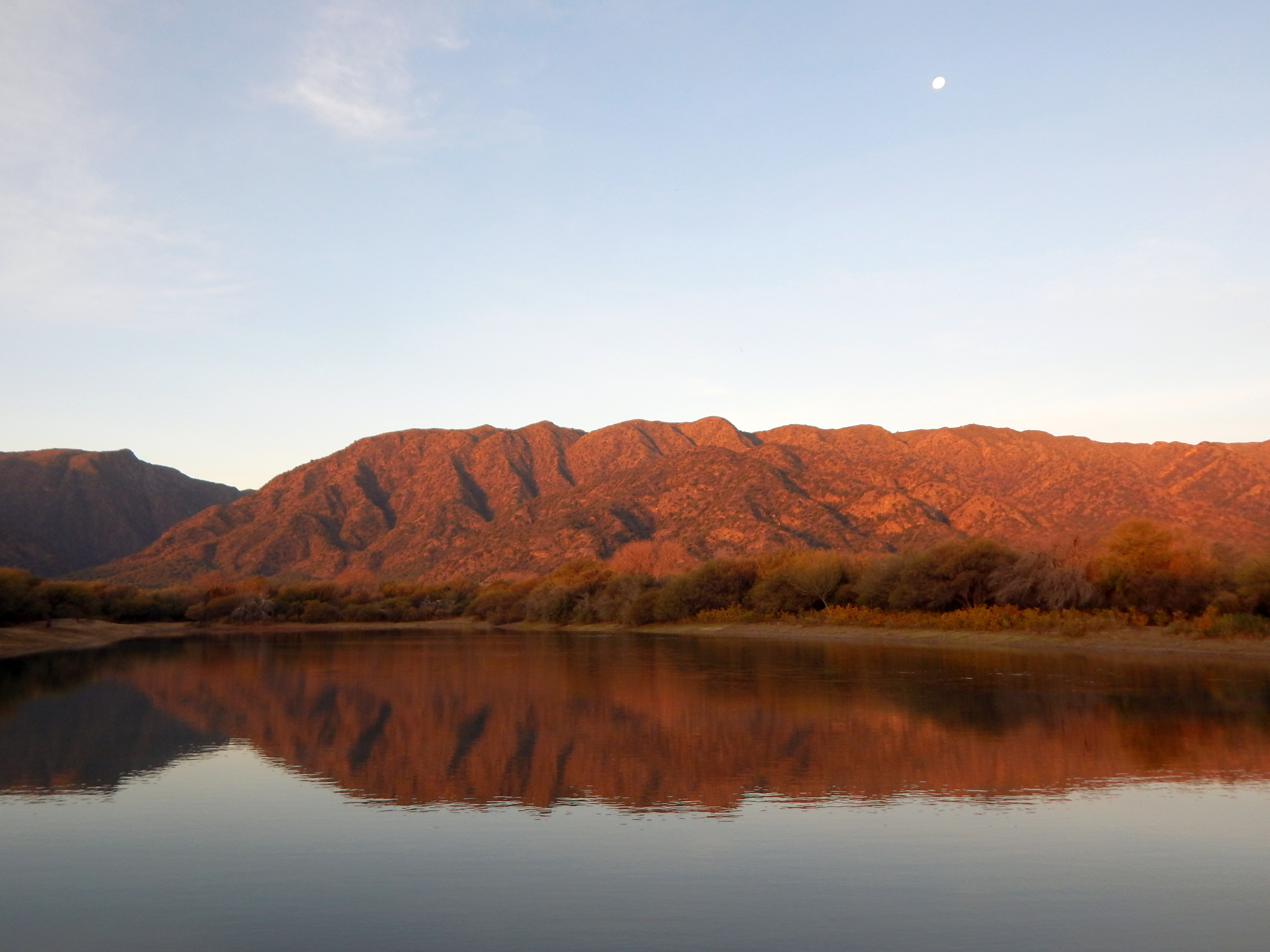
Dam near Chancaní, within the Pocho Department.

Industry represents 17% of the province's income, and the energy production that supports it is based mainly on 15 hydroelectric dams (2.35 billion kW/hours a year) and the Embalse nuclear power plant (600 MWe of capacity, about 2 billion kWh, yearly).

Agriculture and livestock provide 10% of the province's output, well above the national average. The agriculture is centered on soybeans, wheat and maize, and other cereals. Cattle and sheep enjoy the grass of Córdoba's green hills. The province provides the nation with 15% of its beef production and 28% of its dairy output.

Mining includes many different minerals, and construction material such as marble and lime. Uranium is also extracted to feed Argentina's three atomic plants.

Córdoba is connected by rail with Buenos Aires, Rosario, Mendoza and Tucumán. The Ingeniero Aeronáutico Ambrosio L.V. Taravella International Airport, known as Pajas Blancas, handles international and domestic air traffic, with several daily flights to Buenos Aires and some daily flights to Santiago de Chile, Mendoza, Bariloche, Rosario, São Paulo, Panama City, Rio de Janeiro and Lima. Furthermore, Air Europa operates direct flights to Madrid.

== Government ==
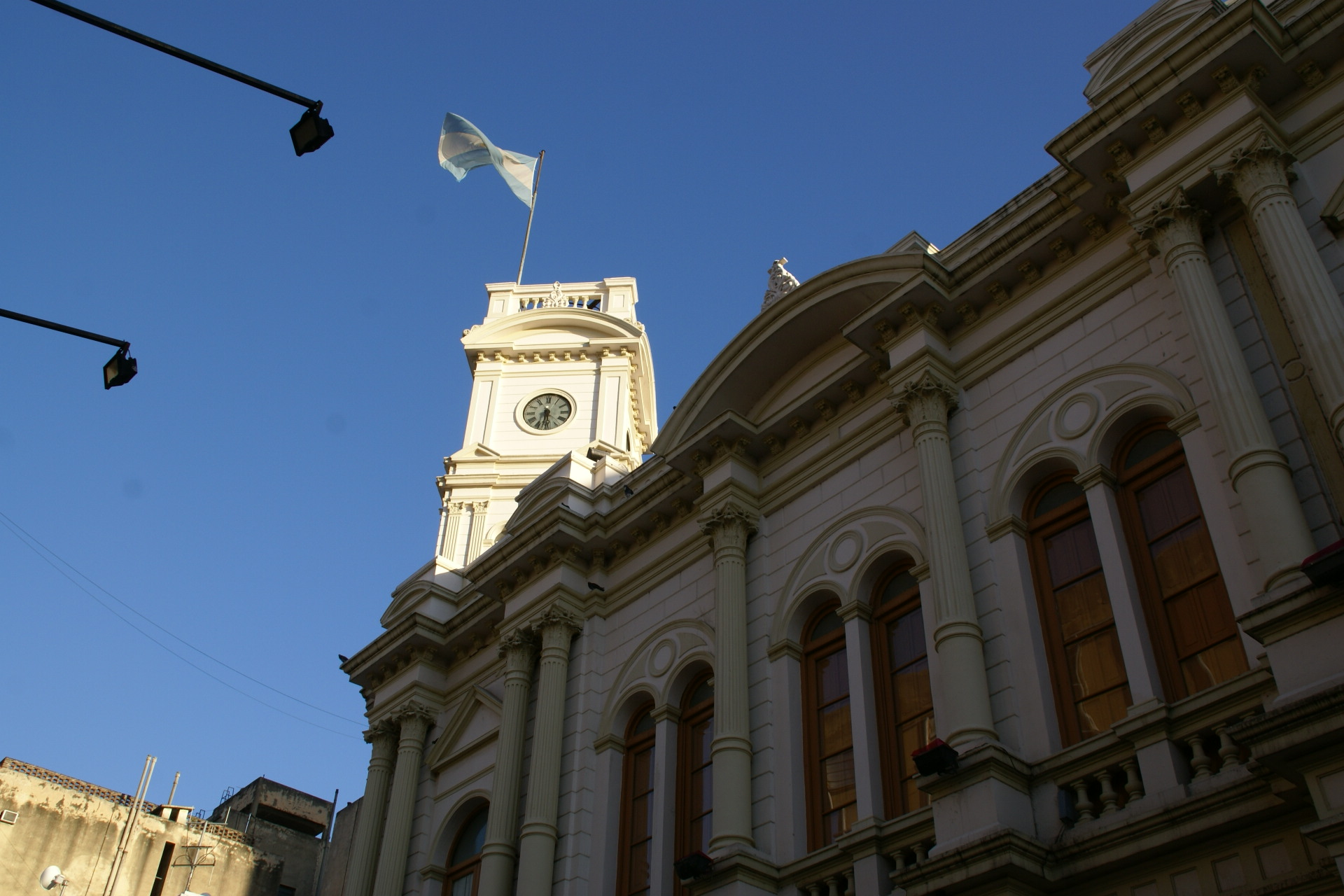
Provincial Legislature

Córdoba has a unicameral legislature elected by universal suffrage. Until December 2001, the legislature was bicameral (a Chamber of Deputies and a Senate), but following the 2001 constitutional reform, this division was abolished. The unified legislature is made up of 70 members: 26 elected to represent each of the provincial departments and 44 elected by the people of the province as a whole and assigned by a proportional system. The Constitution of Córdoba forms the formal law of the province.

The head of government is the governor, accompanied by a vice-governor who presides over the legislature and may fill the governor's place in certain cases. Like the legislators, the governor and vice-governor are elected for a four-year term, and can be re-elected for one consecutive term.

Córdoba has long been a bastion of the centrist Radical Civic Union, but in 1999 the Justicialist José Manuel de la Sota was elected governor, succeeded by fellow Peronist Juan Schiaretti in 2007.

In Argentina, the most important law enforcement organization is the Argentine Federal Police but the additional work is carried out by the Córdoba Provincial Police.

== Political divisions ==
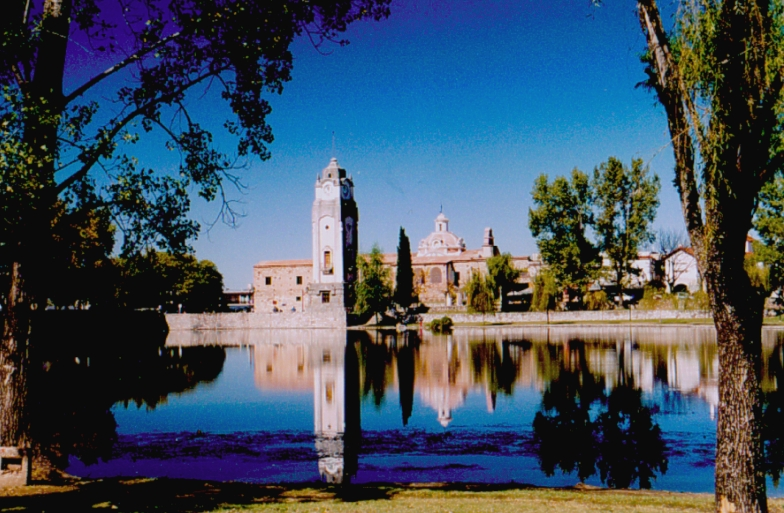
Jesuit Estancia in Alta Gracia

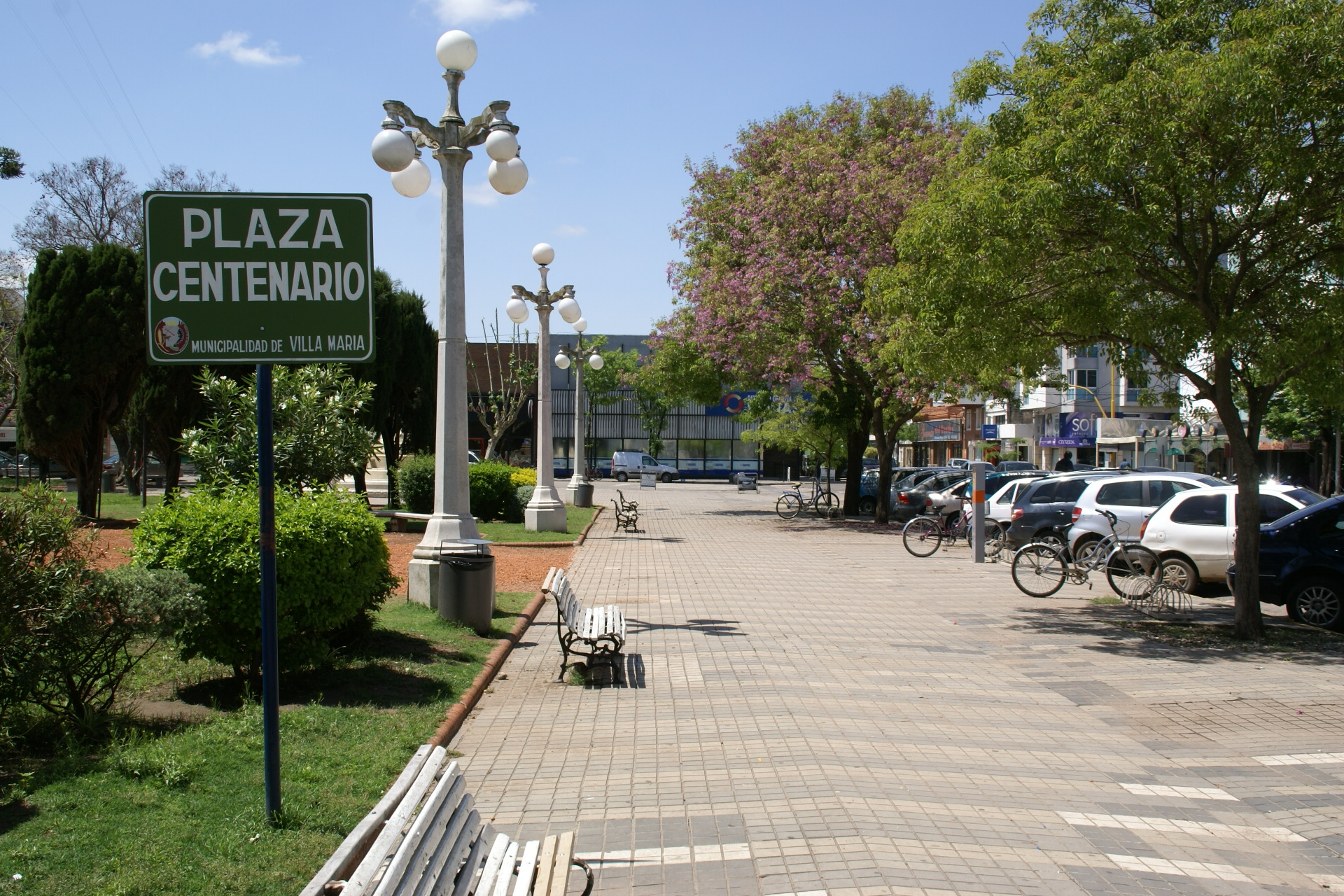
Villa María

The province is divided in 26 regions, or departments (Spanish: departamentos), listed below with their regional capitals.

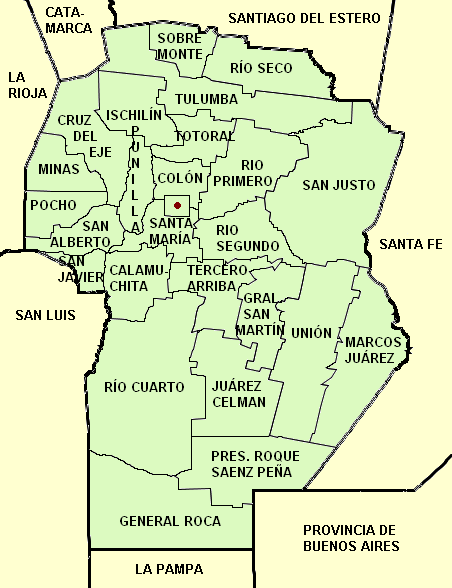
Córdoba province departments

Department	Seat
Calamuchita	San Agustín
Capital	Córdoba
Colón	Jesús María
Cruz del Eje	Cruz del Eje
General Roca	Villa Huidobro
General San Martín	Villa María
Ischilín	Deán Funes
Juárez Celman	La Carlota
Marcos Juárez	Marcos Juárez
Minas	San Carlos Minas
Pocho	Salsacate
Presidente Roque Sáenz Peña	Laboulaye
Punilla	Cosquín
Río Cuarto	Río Cuarto
Río Primero	Santa Rosa de Río Primero
Río Seco	Villa de María del Río Seco
Río Segundo	Villa del Rosario
San Alberto	Villa Cura Brochero
San Javier	Villa Dolores
San Justo	San Francisco
Santa María	Alta Gracia
Sobremonte	San Francisco del Chañar
Tercero Arriba	Oliva
Totoral	Villa del Totoral
Tulumba	Villa Tulumba
Unión	Bell Ville

== See also ==
- List of governors of Córdoba
