= Arroyo Seco =

Arroyo Seco may refer to:

== Places ==
=== Mexico ===
- Arroyo Seco Municipality
- Arroyo Seco, Querétaro

=== United States ===
==== California ====
- Arroyo Seco (Alameda County), a watercourse in Alameda County, California
- Arroyo Seco (Los Angeles County), a watercourse in Los Angeles County, California
- Arroyo Seco (Salinas River), a watercourse in Monterey County, California
  - Arroyo Seco AVA, California wine region in Monterey County
- Arroyo Seco Creek, a watercourse in Sonoma County, California
- Arroyo Seco Junior High School, a middle school in Santa Clarita, California
- Arroyo Seco Parkway, the first California freeway

==== New Mexico ====
- Arroyo Seco Raceway, a paved racetrack near Deming, Luna County, New Mexico
- El Valle de Arroyo Seco, New Mexico, a census-designated place in Santa Fe County, New Mexico
- Arroyo Seco, New Mexico, an unincorporated community in Taos County, New Mexico

=== Other places ===
- Arroyo Seco, Santa Fe, Argentina
- Arroyo Seco, a barrio of Montevideo, Uruguay

== Events ==
Arroyo Seco Fight, a skirmish between Texians and Comanche Indians in Texas in 1838.

== See also ==
- Arroyo (creek), a dry creek or stream bed—gulch
- Seco Creek, Frio County, Texas
