= Football in South America =

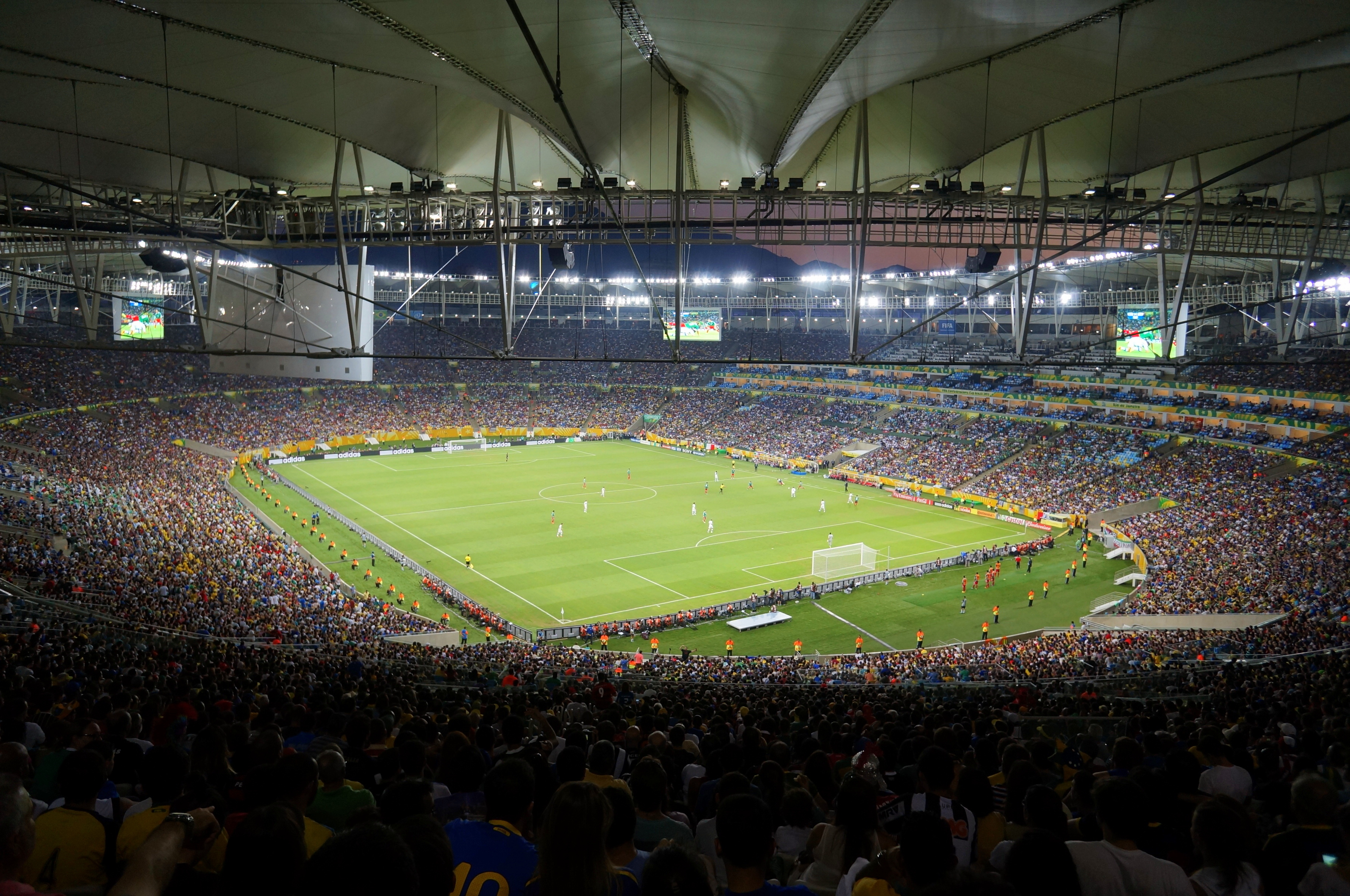
Night view of Maracanã Stadium, June 2013.

Association football is by far the most popular sport in South America. Football was first introduced to the continent during the nineteenth century, as part of the worldwide diffusion of British culture initiated by the British diaspora and subsequent acceptance of the sport by the region's Anglophile elite. Football was widely regarded as a symbol of modernity and good health, and over time it replaced older fashionable sports, such as Bochas. By the middle of the twentieth century, it had become the primary mainstream sport across most of the continent.

The sport's organization is governed by domestic federations (or associations) and continental confederations, all of which are members of FIFA. Most South American football federations are part of CONMEBOL (the South American Football Confederation). There are a few exceptions: the associations based in the Guianas, which are part of CONCACAF (the North American Football Confederation), and the Falkland Islands/Islas Malvinas. The development of football is also organized by these domestic and international federations in conjunction with governmental sports authorities. Each country in South America has its own unique football development infrastructure, enjoying varying degrees of success.

== History ==
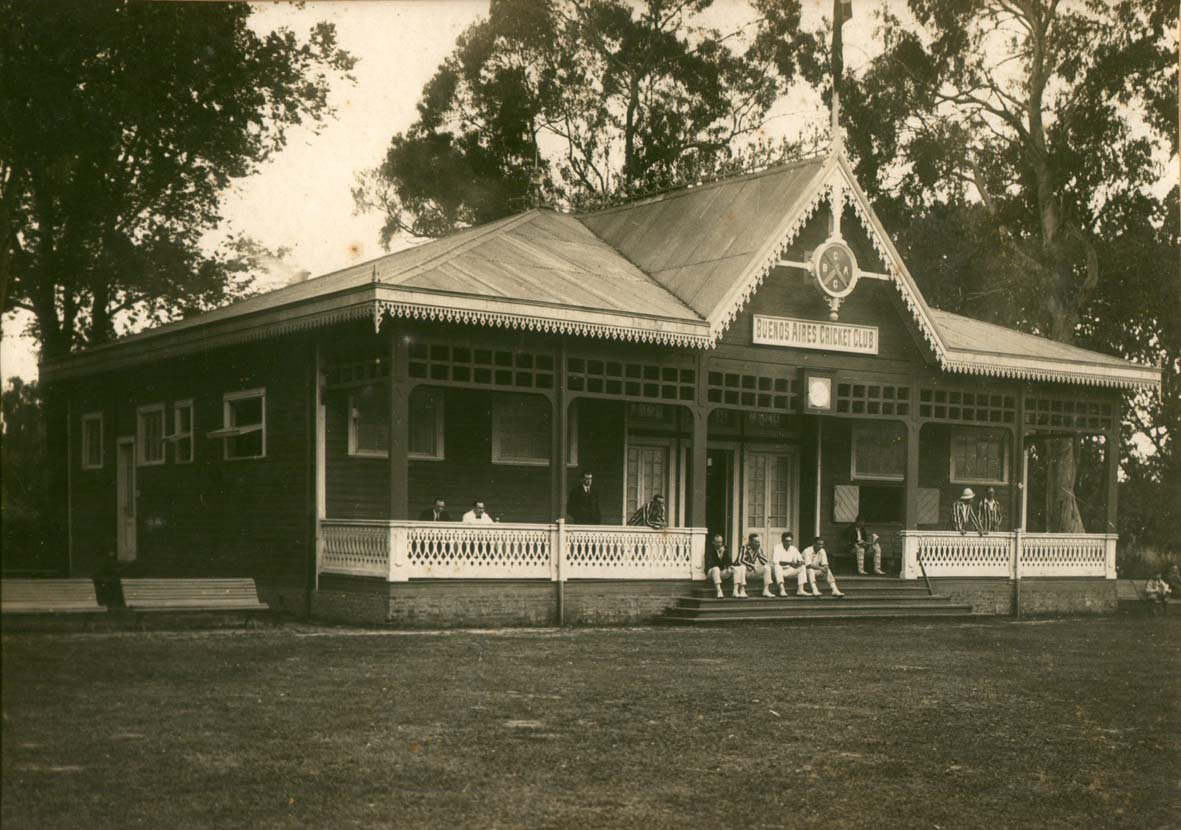
The first football match in Argentina was played on the Buenos Aires Cricket Club Ground on June 20, 1867, where the Planetarium is today.

=== European origin and colonization ===
Although Football started in Europe as early as the 17th century, it had not gained national recognition until 1863. Prior to this, football was seen more as a pastime. Yet, despite the lack of a common structure of the game, historians have found that unofficial forms of football were played often, particularly amongst young men in public schools. As this trend rose, a call to standardize the game occurred, and in the 1860s, official rules were established which paved the way for football to travel as an established sport, rather than a simple game.

However, it could not be increased European popularity alone that contributed to its Latin American beginnings. In the late 19th century, British influence extended further than physical practices; their colonization also caused changes in social norms. The systems being established encouraged an assimilation to European culture. So, when synthesizing the large European community employed by railroads in Buenos Aires with the habitual evolution that was occurring due to colonization, locals began to play football as their British counterparts brought it overseas. This extended into an unofficial football league, known as the Great British League, which in practice was divided into an English and a Scottish league.

=== Early Growth ===
The gradual rise in popularity of football after 1867 was due mainly to the influence of schools and the associated sports clubs. In Paraguay, Dutch physical education teacher William Paats taught his pupils the game and established rules, although he is not credited with the sport's breakthrough in the country. That honor goes to a Paraguayan who had witnessed one of the first league games in Buenos Aires.

The first official competition was held in Argentina in 1891, preceding the foundation of the football leagues of both Europe and the Americas. La Liga was contested that year between five clubs, each club facing its opponents twice.

Football spread elsewhere in South America, as it had in the port of Buenos Aires and later throughout Argentina. The process also occurred in North America, where Europeans settling in the United States and Canada in the second half of the nineteenth century brought football with them.

Before the end of the nineteenth century, informal football matches were already being held between teams hailing from different parts of the newly-formed countries. Finally, in the twentieth century football was introduced in the United States as a counterpoint to American football. In the northern part of Latin America, baseball and basketball were introduced, competing with football and slowing the development of football infrastructure in Central America compared with other parts of the continent. In 1927, Costa Rica became the first country to sign up to the world football association, FIFA, founded in 1904. In 1929, it was followed by Mexico. Football had been introduced by Europeans who had remained in America but, in turn, young Latin Americans were attracted to Europe. When capitalism was introduced in Central and South America, countries like Costa Rica became a link in the global economy. As a result, European countries had an impact not just on political and economic matters, but also in the cultural field. The younger generation went to Western Europe, especially England, and was exposed to football at public facilities and university squares there.

Courtesy of the British colonies in the Caribbean, cricket won the popularity contest against football, among other pastimes. Football was popular in Jamaican townships, but at a regional level it only broke through towards the end of the twentieth century. The first match between two Caribbean countries was held in 1925. In a series of three encounters, the Jamaica national football team won three times over Haiti. Four years later, the first Nations Cup was played on the Central American mainland, in celebration of the centenary of independence from Spain.

=== Integration into society ===
Football was first introduced to South America in 1867, in Argentina. Brazil, to which the Briton Charles Miller brought football in 1894, is considered the second South American country in which football made an appearance. Miller was born in São Paulo of a Brazilian mother who belonged to the elite of that city's population. Miller's father was a railroad worker of Scottish descent.

Miller was sent to boarding school in Southampton at the age of ten, in 1884. Like the Costa Rican circular migrants, he discovered football in England. Miller went on to found the first team in Brazil, as part of the athletics club of São Paulo, and also the first football league, the Campeonato Paulista.

Europeans living in Latin America played the sport. Football grew in popularity among railway employees, and increasingly attracted attention away from cricket. British football was introduced in countries like Panama, Bolivia, Peru and Venezuela, but the sport's full integration into society followed later. Brazilians and Argentinians were the first to record football as a part of their culture. The sport caught on quickly, especially in less affluent neighborhoods. Children played from an early age in the streets, squares, vacant lots and fields and devised strategies and techniques. Football clubs and youth programs sprang up. In the 1930s, the highest-level competitive divisions in most Latin American countries included some professional football clubs. By that time, where previously it had been a sport primarily for Europeans, football had become definitively established in the culture and enjoyed great popularity almost everywhere. In 1923, Brazilian CR Vasco da Gama became the first professional club to recruit local, black players, launching an irreversible trend.

==== Renewed British influence ====
While the British brought football to Latin America, they did not implement successful and consistent integration policies. Across the continent, their ideas about football faded within a short time, leaving no clear overall game concept or generally accepted rules. In the early twentieth century, British football clubs began touring in countries in the Americas. They taught practitioners of the sport an English way of playing, stimulating new developments in Latin American football. These tours led to the semi-amateur sport becoming a professional spectator sport. Southampton F.C., founded in 1885, travelled to Buenos Aires in 1904 at the invitation of the Sociedad Hípica, an elite club in the Argentine capital. The high attendance demonstrated that the friendly match between the local club and Southampton was not just a sporting encounter but an elite social event. The then President of Argentina, Julio Roca, attended the match, accompanied by his War Secretary and a military escort, as football had recently been introduced in the Argentine Army. During its tour in Buenos Aires and Uruguay's capital Montevideo, Southampton made a great impression on the local population, especially the British. British belief in their own sporting superiority was strengthened.

Nottingham Forest F.C. followed, in 1905. During the trip across the Atlantic, the players kept fit by playing cricket on deck. They toured Montevideo, Rosario and Buenos Aires for a total of seven matches. The results showed their superiority over the local football clubs. Británicos and Liga Argentina (Note: The name "Liga Argentina" probably designated a star ensemble or representative team of Argentine football. This team is mentioned in several sources covering conflict between Argentinian gameplay and the original British style. The team would have consisted almost entirely of Anglo-Argentine players) were defeated 13–1 and 9–1 respectively. Nottingham Forest also easily dispatched the national team of Argentina 5–0. Ultimately, Nottingham F.C. scored 52 goals on its South American tour and conceded only three. Its impressive dominance on the field further reinforced the football-loving British sense of superiority. The popularity of the British clubs led a group of employees of a luxury department store in downtown Buenos Aires to establish their own independent football club, CA Independiente, in 1904. They then changed the team color to red, a choice inspired by Nottingham Forest and reinforced by the symbolic connection of the color with the socialist movement in the country, which some of Independiente's founders supported.

1906 marked a turning point in Argentinian football, and Latin American football as a whole, when a South African team played a series of matches in South America. South African football had developed along lines reasonably similar to Latin America. While the South African club still played below the level of the British, the game had developed a lot more than the game played in countries like Argentina and Uruguay. They defeated Brazilian club Paulista 6–0, and scored 14 goals to eliminate a student team. Alumni Athletic Club, founded in 1898, was the only club able to make a stand against the South Africans. After its 1–0 win, the first victory of an Argentinian club against an overseas opponent, the audience stormed the field to lift the players high in celebration. This is presumed to have been the first such win in Latin America, and Alumni were congratulated by the then President of the Republic. Visits from overseas clubs signalled the increasing integration of football in society, boosting the sport's professionalization and the public's enthusiasm. British clubs accepted invitations in order to play the role of "football missionary", which proved of great importance for the further development of Latin American football.

=== First confederations and international competitions ===
The number of clubs with paid contracts rose, and both the Board and the game professionalized. In 1910, for the first time a country tournament involving more than two national teams was held, although it was informal and not officially recognized by CONMEBOL. The three matches of the Copa Centenario Revolución de Mayo, between host Argentina, Chile, and Uruguay, were played in May and June. Argentina was the unbeaten winner. This tournament is also considered the first Copa América, or its direct precursor. The official first edition of the Copa América, at the time called the Campeonato Sudamericano de Fútbol, was organized by Argentina in 1916 to commemorate the centenary of the Argentine War of Independence (1810–1818). Four countries took part, with Brazil invited in addition to the previous participants. Uruguay won two matches, emerging as the first South American champion. The then 19-year-old Isabelino Gradín was Uruguay's best player, and the tournament's top scorer, with three goals. A day after Uruguay's big victory in Chile, the Chilean Football Federation demanded reversal of the results, on the grounds that two Africans were on the Uruguayan team. Gradín, who had scored twice in that match, was one, as his great-grandparents had been slaves from Lesotho. Chile's protest was ultimately rejected, and Uruguay declared the rightful winner. The Uruguayan team went on to win six of the first ten editions, losing the final once and facing protests from Chile on two occasions.

The Campeonato Sudamericano was the world's first tournament between nations, pre-dating the European Football Championship founded almost half a century later. In 1916, Chile was also the only country that had a national team with several black players.

The continental football confederation CONMEBOL was founded during the first Copa América on July 9, 1910, permanently ending the profound influence of the Western Europeans who had introduced the sport to Latin America. Although this first tournament was not entirely without incident – in addition to the Chilean protest, there were riots during the final game, in which the wooden bleachers were set on fire – it formed the basis for a tournament among nations that took place, initially every two years and then annually, under the auspices of the oldest continental football association.

=== Modern International Organizations and Events ===
The early to mid 20th century marked an important turn in attention for not only football in Latin America, but football as a whole. In 1930, in an effort to further grow football and increase its relevance on the world stage, the Fédération Internationale de Football Association, or FIFA, was created in France. The crowning achievement of which was the World Cup, which created a venue for football to flourish outside the amateur scene, without being overshadowed by the Olympics and its litany of competitions. As FIFA became the industry standard of football, and the World Cup became the highest coveted stage, Latin American countries rose to the challenge; in the short years that followed, South America's premier football hubs such as Uruguay, Argentina, Chile, and Brazil were quick to professionalize their football in order to meet and compete with European standards.

After the globalization of Latin American football, more continental events began to emerge. For instance, 1951 marked the first edition of the Pan-American games, in which football was one of the events at the forefront; Argentina defended their home city, taking the gold medal while playing in Buenos Aires. Later on, CONCACAF was founded in 1961 for Central America and the Caribbean. Before that time, there were two separate federations. The Confederación Centroamericana y del Caribe de Fútbol (CCCF), founded in 1938, covered most countries in Central America and the Caribbean. The North American Football Confederation (NAFC) was created in 1946 for Canada, the United States, Mexico and Cuba. The first international football tournaments were held in this northern part of Latin America. Costa Rica won seven of the ten CCCF Championships, and Mexico won three of four NAFC Championships.

Throughout Latin America, international club tournaments followed later. An exception was the highest-ranking clubs in Uruguay and Argentina, which began organizing small tournaments in the early twentieth century. These tournaments, called the Copa Río de la Plata, welcomed both the clubs and their supporters. However, the creation of the South American Championship of Champions (Campeonato Sudamericano de Campeones) by the Chilean club Colo Colo in 1948 was the official launch of a competition where the champions of different leagues would face each other. Seven clubs from seven CONMEBOL countries participated in this one-off tournament. CD Lítoral (Bolivia) and CS Emelec (Ecuador) were the only clubs with no experience, not having their own national competition. The Campeonato Sudamericano also led to the creation of the first international form of competition for clubs in Europe. Frenchman Jacques Ferran, a journalist for L'Equipe, reported on the South American tournament, and was so enthusiastic that he briefed his editor on the concept. Gabriel Hanot then brought the idea to UEFA, leading indirectly to the introduction of the European Cup in 1955. In the CONCACAF region, the Champions' Cup was founded in 1962. For a short time, this served as a qualifying tournament for the Copa Libertadores, established by CONMEBOL in 1960. Almost from its inception, the tournament was dominated by Mexican clubs.

==== Uruguay’s first Olympics ====
The 1924 Summer Olympics was the first global event in which a football team from Latin America participated. Atilio Narancio, a board member of the Uruguayan Football Association, wanted the national team to play in the tournament in Paris. In South America, even in Uruguay, this was considered incomprehensible and unwise. Preparation time to ready a team for the trip to Europe and high-level play was short, funding insufficient, and Uruguayans feared humiliation by the European players despite success in their own part of the world. (Note: By the time Uruguay announced its participation in the Summer Olympics of 1924, the country had already won the South American championship four times and had often dominated the other two major South American football countries, Argentina and Brazil.) Most players had regular jobs they could not leave from one day to the next. Typical was the position of the captain of Uruguay's national team. José Nasazzi was a marble-cutter during the week, and was at work when he heard the decision to participate in the Games despite the criticism. The decision was taken only after lobbying in the Uruguayan parliament, which had to give consent before final preparations could be made.

The Uruguayan selection left for Europe on the cheapest boat available, sailing to Spain where they played a series of exhibition matches. These friendly encounters were intended to finance the costly trip across the Atlantic and the stay in Paris during the tournament. The Uruguayan team did not lose a single match in Spain, the country that was still the colonial power in South America barely a century before. Seeing club after club defeated, and leaving nothing to chance, Atlético Madrid, one of the biggest clubs at the time, quickly brought talent from across the country to Madrid. The referees would take the necessary decisions, and the presence of the king, Alfonso XIII, among the twenty thousand spectators would add to the Spanish players’ motivation. It did not help: Madrid in turn was unable to win.

Despite this success, Uruguay entered the Olympic tournament as the underdog. European participants, overconfident, were unimpressed by an overseas opponent that had travelled no further than Argentina before 1924. Yugoslavia, Uruguay's first opponent, which would go on to place third in the first World Cup six years later, suffered a 7–0 defeat. While this was not the worst first round result, it caused consternation. Yugoslav game-play had been sound, and cooperation between the players smooth, and yet the unknown Uruguayan team had played them off the field. Three days later, the United States were defeated; in the quarterfinals Uruguay beat France without difficulty. In the semifinals Uruguay encountered some resistance, scoring a winning penalty against the Dutch just nine minutes before the end of the match. On June 9, 1924, Uruguay won the Olympic football tournament, beating Switzerland 3–0.

Uruguay won again at the next Olympic Games, in Amsterdam in 1928, with Argentina also reaching the final after a series of decisive victories which included an 11–2 win against the United States. It was a global introduction to the successful Latin American approach and style of play.

=== First World Cups ===
==== Uruguay 1930 ====
In May 1929, Uruguay was appointed host country of the first World Cup, to be held in 1930. As winner of the two preceding Olympic football tournaments, Uruguay was a logical candidate. Several European countries also applied, but withdrew in quick succession in an attempt to promote Italy's bid. The award of hosting rights to a Latin American country led to boycotts by Hungary, Italy, the Netherlands, Spain and Sweden. Two months before the start of the event, no European country had accepted the invitation. Germany, Austria, Czechoslovakia and Switzerland also withdrew, citing the long trip to Uruguay.

The organizers offered financial compensation for the two-week transatlantic cruise, in vain. British nations were not eligible to participate as they were not yet members of FIFA. The only European countries that ultimately undertook the trip to Uruguay were Belgium, France, Yugoslavia and Romania. Latin American countries were well represented, comprising eight of the thirteen participants, and included Argentina, Bolivia, and Mexico. Over seventeen days, the first global football tournament was played in three stadiums in and around Montevideo, alongside the Olympic Games. The thirteen countries were divided into four groups, each group winner securing a place in the semi-finals. Construction of the first stadium with a capacity of more than 100,000 spectators, Estadio Centenario, named after the centenary of independence, was only completed five days after the start of the championship. The delay, caused by heavy rain, resulted in some matches being diverted to two other stadiums in the area, without further incident.

In the days leading up to the finals you could already see that the Centenario would be completely filled. We knew it was our big chance to beat Argentina, the country with which we had a strong rivalry at that time. And that's what happened. The atmosphere and our fighting spirit overwhelmed the Argentines. Even Luis Monti, who was one of their key players, didn't kick anyone, and played like a gentleman. We made optimal use of our advantages.

— José Nasazzi

Uruguay was favorite for the title of first world champion, after establishing itself as a strong footballing country with its wins at the Olympic Games of 1924 and 1928. High discipline was expected of the Uruguayan selection, which had isolated itself for two months to prepare. Illustrating this strict approach, goalkeeper Andrés Mazali, who had played in both Olympic finals, was dismissed from the selection for failing to respect the team curfew.

The first match was played on July 13. France beat Mexico 4–1, Frenchman Lucien Laurent entering the record books as the first World Cup scorer. It was France's only win of the tournament, and one of only four matches won by European countries. Controversial action by the Brazilian referee in the third match, between France and the favorite Argentina, caused an uproar. He ended the game six minutes before the end of regular time, just after Argentinian player Monti had taken an unsuccessful free-kick and French striker Langiller had set up a counterattack and was about to equalize. The referee's call angered France and led to chaos on the field, until he decided to allow the two teams back onto the field to play out the remaining time.

Argentina played its second game against Mexico, also from Latin America, and won 6–3. Argentinian Manuel Ferreira had opted out shortly before the match, as he had to take a university exam. His replacement was Guillermo Stábile, who went on to become the first top Scorer of the World Cup. While he scored three goals against Mexico, he did not take out the record as scoring the first hat-trick in World Cup history. (Note: Until November 2006, details of the first hat-tricks of the World Cup remained vague. Most archives and literature attributed the record to Stábile; a minority identified American Bert Patenaude as having scored three times against Paraguay, two days before the Argentina-Mexico match. After review by FIFA, on November 10, 2006, Patenaude was designated the first footballer in World Cup history to score a hat-trick.)

The first World Cup final was a repeat of the Olympic final of 1928. In the semifinals, Argentina and Uruguay both defeated their opponents 6–1 (the United States and Yugoslavia respectively). Several incidents occurred prior to this match. There was disagreement over the game ball: both finalists wanted to play with a homegrown football, which forced FIFA to intervene. The conflict was settled by playing the first half with an Argentinian ball and the second half with a ball of Uruguayan origin. Thousands of Argentinian supporters took ferries across the Río de la Plata, the natural border between the two countries, to attend the match. Because of fears of harassment by supporters, the referee for the final was announced just three hours before the start of the game. The referee, Belgian John Langenus, demanded a police escort and a boat to take him out of the country immediately after the final.

Both finalists had proved their scoring ability during the tournament. (Note: Argentina scored 18 goals during the 1930 FIFA World Cup, Uruguay 15. The goal average for the tournament was 3.89 goals per game, one of the highest averages in the history of the championship. Other than the all-time record of 5.38 for the 1954 FIFA World Cup such an average has never been equalled.) Three goals were scored in the first half: Uruguayan Dorado opened the scoring twelve minutes in; Argentina dominated the remainder of the first half, equalizing eight minutes later, and taking the lead with a controversial goal by Stábile in the 37th minute. Uruguay made an unsuccessful protest to the referee, alleging an offside offence. After half-time the situation changed, Uruguay gaining the upper hand with a long-distance shot and a header. The final ended with a 4–2 win for host Uruguay, confirming its status as the dominant football nation. For the second time in a row, a global football tournament had ended with a confrontation between the two South American countries, no European country able to match them. Other Latin American countries fared little better. In its three group matches, Mexico ceded thirteen goals. Peru did not do much better in its group. Bolivia showed before the event that it had little hope of success, each of its players wearing one letter on his jersey that together made up the slogan "VIVA URUGUAY". This did nothing to influence the Uruguayan referee in Bolivia's match against Yugoslavia; at least four Bolivian goals were incorrectly disallowed.

==== Italy 1934 ====
While most European countries ignored the invitation to participate in the first World Cup in 1930, in the lead-up to the second World Cup enthusiasm increased rapidly. Because of the success of the first tournament, the World Cup was now the largest global football event and more countries wanted a chance to win. Thirty-two of the then fifty FIFA members made their interest known. The large number of participants made the creation of a qualifying tournament necessary. Two Latin American countries decided to participate. Surprisingly, these did not include defending champion Uruguay, which had not forgotten the European countries' wholesale rejection of invitations in 1930 and decided not to send a selection across the ocean. Brazil and Argentina represented the Americas along with the United States at the championship hosted by Benito Mussolini's Italy.

The 1934 World Cup was not successful. Argentina sent a selection to Italy almost entirely comprising semi-amateurs, as local clubs refused to let their players go. The board committees feared that if they allowed players to participate, once in Italy they would succumb to irresistible offers from European clubs. Until that point, Brazil had been in the shadow of Uruguay and Argentina, lack of preparation and a naive attitude to international competition undermining the individual qualities of its selection.

==== France 1938 ====
In 1936, FIFA designated France as host of the third World Cup. This was highly criticized by Argentina, and throughout Latin America, for breaking the unwritten rule that the World Cup would alternate between South America and Europe. FIFA had taken into account the number of FIFA members per continent in its decision – the great majority of the then 57 members came from Europe – and did not forget the difficulties of the first World Cup, when few countries traveled to Uruguay. FIFA was also expressing through this choice its loyalty to its president, Frenchman Jules Rimet, who initiated the first FIFA World Cup, held in 1930. After its candidacy failed, Argentina boycotted the event. Uruguay again decided not to participate. Colombia, Costa Rica, El Salvador, Mexico and Suriname withdrew from the qualifier, which meant Brazil and Cuba were assured a place in the main tournament.

Cuba, a country that had not been involved in world football before 1938, created surprise by equalling the strong Romanian team in a 3–3 tie. In the second game against Romania, the Caribbean team gained the upper hand, scoring a victory considered the biggest upset of the tournament. The short preparation time before the quarterfinals left Cuba with no chance against more powerful Sweden, which won 8–0. The reformed Brazilian team was made up of racially diverse players. Gone was its naive attitude and tendency to improvisation, replaced by more structured football. Its use of only two defenders had an impact on the final score: Brazil defeated Poland 6–5 in extra time. Despite the makeover, Brazil's aggressive play was on show in the confrontation with Czechoslovakia in the quarterfinals. The 1–1 match ended with only sixteen of the twenty-two players on the field; the referee gave three red cards, and three injured players were taken off the field after a brawl. The second Brazil-Czechoslovakia match was without incident, Brazil winning by one goal. Following the battles of the quarterfinals, the coach decided to rest several players in the semi-final against Italy. This turned out to be a tactical miscalculation, and Brazil lost to the ultimate world champions. But its third-place result gave encouragement to the young Brazilian squad for the following years.

=== Latin American dominance ===
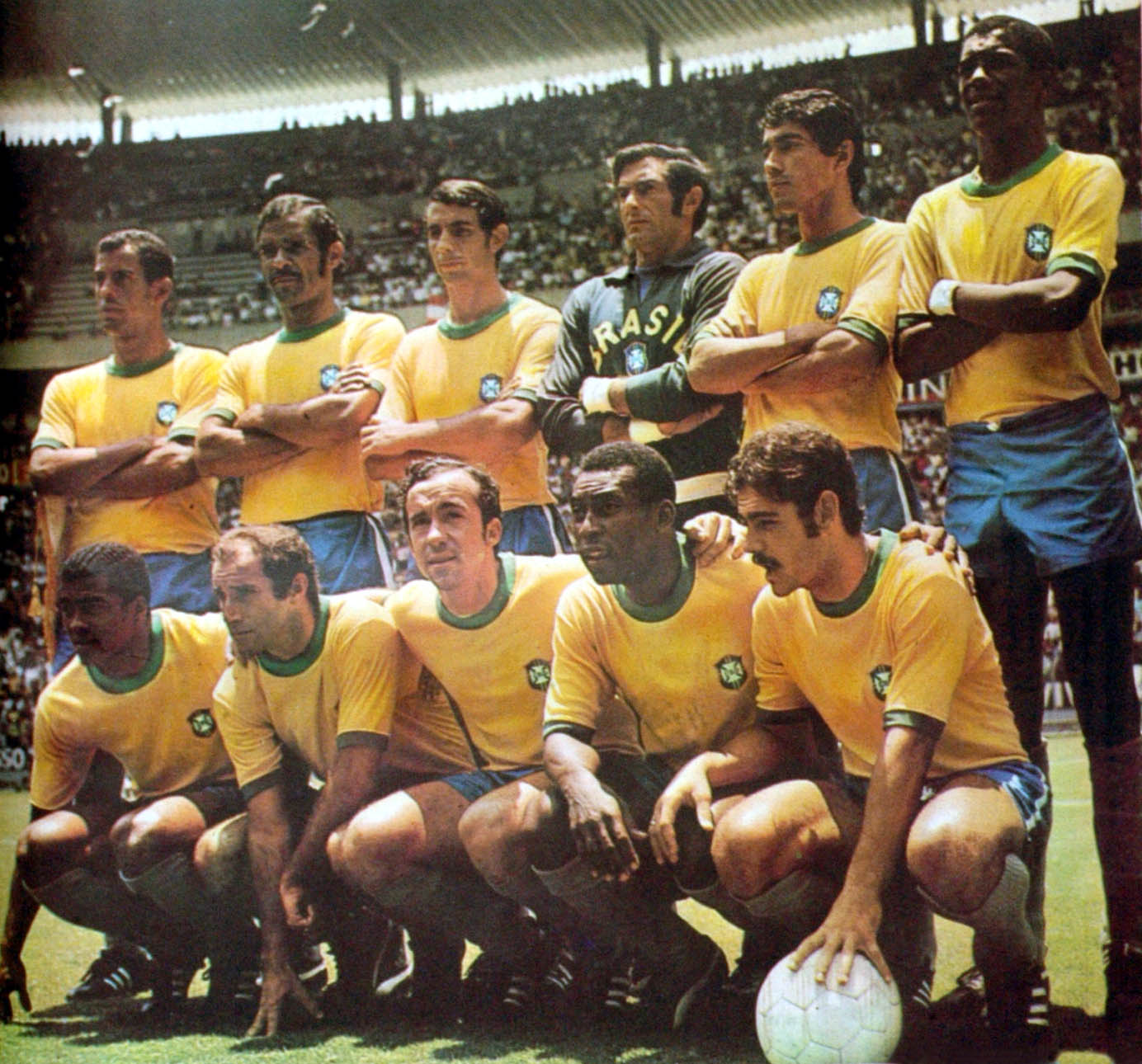
The 1970 FIFA World Cup-winning Brazil team, considered by many distinguished commentators as the greatest football team ever

Latin America continued to grow in international football, as did the international impact of its three biggest football-playing countries: Brazil, which participated in all World Cup events; Argentina, only absent from the main event four times; and Uruguay, which won the first championship after World War II. In 1962, Chile hosted the seventh World Cup. Brazil maintained its title, which no country had done before. While the Caribbean countries could not play a significant role on the world stage, some of the Central American countries did. Mexico attracted attention, peaking in 1970 when the country organized the first, World Cup in Central America. The Aztec Stadium was the scene of one of the most memorable finals, in which the Italian team was defeated 4–1 by Brazil's "Dream Team". The Italian national newspaper Il Messaggero wrote that Italy had been defeated by "the best footballers in the world." Uruguay was overtaken by Brazil, finishing fourth after losing a semi-final to the ultimate champions. Four years later, the stage was completely European; the five Latin American countries made no impression. In 1978, host country Argentina defeated the Netherlands in the Final. In subsequent World Cup editions, more countries from both Central and South America enjoyed success.

In 1990, all Spanish-speaking countries reached the round of 16. This included Spain, which put in a performance similar to that of Uruguay, the country that had caused a stir in the 1930s when it outclassed all the clubs it played in Spain. Mexico has qualified for the World Cup continuously since 1994, reaching the second round each time before being eliminated. Of the first four championships of the 21st century, the least successful for Latin America was the 2006 tournament in Germany, with no country reaching the semi-finals. The 2014 World Cup in Brazil was a Latin American success story, despite European nations taking first and third place. Colombia and Chile made an impression with their strong play. Colombian James Rodríguez was the top scorer, named player of the tournament and awarded a prize for the best goal. Central American nation Costa Rica surprised by surviving the "group of death" to reach the quarterfinals. (Note: The term "group of death" is usually relative. When an average is taken of the positions of the four countries in each group, the group containing the strongest teams can be established. In 2014, this was group D, comprising Costa Rica, England, Italy, and Uruguay.) Argentina earned a place in the final, where it lost 0–1 to Germany. Host country Brazil was an exception, losing 1–7 to Germany in the semifinals, and 0–3 to the Netherlands in the third place play-off.

At club level, technical gameplay is not as developed, and not as much money is put into football in Latin America as in Europe. The most talented players are scouted and bought by European clubs, which does not stimulate further development or raise the standard of national competition. (Note: Latin America’s economic position has had a direct impact on its position in the football world. Geographically, Latin America as a region is often represented as peripheral in the world system. The absence of major economic power is related to insufficient investment in the required infrastructure and facilities to create an environment in which football can develop further, including on a financial level: construction of modern stadiums with good pitches, investment in youth education, prevention of match-fixing, et cetera. The creaming off of talented players and resulting stagnation of development are a consequence of the economic situation) In 2000, FIFA launched a World Cup for clubs, with Brazil as the first host country. The most successful clubs from around the world come together at this tournament. For the first ten editions, Latin American clubs from Central and North America, almost always from Mexico, played no significant role. Brazilian clubs Corinthians, São Paulo FC, and Internacional won four titles altogether; the other tournaments were won by Western European clubs. Argentina's Independiente won the South American club tournament Copa Libertadores seven times, with another Argentinian club, Club Atlético Boca Juniors, in second place.

For North and Central America and the Caribbean, the equivalent of this tournament is the CONCACAF Champions League. As at 2014, of the 51 seasons Mexico had emerged as champion 30 times.

Promising footballers whose talent had first flourished in Latin America became less and less active domestically, yielding to offers from clubs in Europe. In 1988, Romário followed this path, moving from Brazilian club Vasco da Gama to the Dutch PSV, where he scored 98 goals in five seasons. Another example is Daniel Passarella who, a few years after winning the World Cup with Argentina, emigrated to Italy. Brazilian Ronaldo made his appearance in Europe in 1994, also at PSV. Three years later, in 1997, he became the first Latin American to win the Ballon d'Or, an annual award for the best footballer in Europe. The best footballer in the world in the twentieth century, Diego Maradona, (Note: Diego Maradona was voted footballer of the century by the public, voting on the FIFA website. He won more than 55% of the vote, ahead of Pelé with nearly 40%. In the same vote, selected experts from all over the world chose Pele.) scored 115 goals in seven years at SSC Napoli.

CONMEBOL has ten national association members: 30% of its federations have won the FIFA World Cup (men's tournament): Argentina (3), Brazil (5), Uruguay (2), with Uruguay supposedly receiving recognition from FIFA for winning the 1924 and 1928 Olympics, counting as men's world championships, which explains why FIFA permits Uruguay to represent 4 stars on their world cup jersey. By comparison, UEFA has 55 member associations with 5 members winning the FIFA World Cup for a total of 12 trophies. While being smaller, CONMEBOL appears to have a similar number of FIFA men's championship trophies as UEFA, which suggests that its success rate in the international game exceeds its weight within the overall FIFA membership population—CONMEBOL having less than 10% of FIFA national association members, performs above its representation within FIFA by winning nearly 50% of FIFA men's championships, while it seems to be the confederation with the largest proportion of its membership (30%) winning world cups. Similar comparisons for South American men in international football at club level (playing with European, South American, North American clubs) would likely yield similar results, showing South American football players winning a disproportionate number of titles in relation to their actual percentage of the overall football population of men. During the historical period covered in this article, South America became a centre of football development, receiving European influences, and then becoming an influence on the rest of the world game at the level of clubs—for instance, compare recent MLS (United States) title winning rosters/coaching, or European club winners of international trophies showing South American contributors.

== Playing style ==
=== Initial game conception ===
In the decades after the introduction of football to Latin America, an individual playing style developed. In the early days almost all players were of British origin, with a British concept of the sport. This style of play placed greater value on sportsmanship and fair play than passion and a fighting spirit. Typical was the Argentine Alumni Athletic Club, which refused to take a penalty kick because the players felt the referee had wrongly awarded it to them. Playing by the rules was of primary importance. In Britain and elsewhere, the so-called 2–3–5 system was used, featuring two defenders, three midfielders, and five attackers. For a long time, no club in Latin America deviated from this format, as it was the global standard. British domination of football culture gradually declined on all fronts, including in its influence on style of play. Strength and discipline gave way to agility, perhaps due to the increasing influence of Spanish and Italian immigrants. Where in Britain there were large fields, in Latin America football was played in poor neighborhoods with little available space, usually on rough ground. In the streets and small squares in the neighborhoods of cities like Buenos Aires, Montevideo and Rio de Janeiro, a new way of playing developed to suit the poor living and playing conditions. Players wanted precise control of the ball and learned all kinds of tricks to achieve this. Disciplined teamwork disappeared, the player alone knocking out his opponent to create additional space for himself. The first generation of this type of footballer called the style el toque, or "touch", as though stroking the ball.

This new game concept conflicted with the old British standard. The Nottingham Forest F.C. tour of Argentina and Uruguay in 1905 exemplified the differences. The English club, with its textbook original gameplay, caused mixed feelings among the players and spectators at a match with a representative local team. While the Argentinian players tried to win through skill and cleverness, the British showed off their physical playing style. Supporters of European descent were enthusiastic about Nottingham's play, and its dominance, while the local population felt wronged by the disdain shown towards their own players' ball skills. The English-language, anglophile Buenos Aires Herald reproached the representative team that "had dared to criticize Forest's play", writing that the sport was intended to improve the endurance of its practitioners and to test the fitness of young men, and that it was no parlor game. English Swindon Town F.C., which toured South America seven years later, was one of the few clubs open to the new game concept. Its manager acknowledged that he had never seen amateurs play so well, and generally praised the local opponents, although he was also concerned at the "use of every opportunity to exhibit solo agility." Some of the Anglo-Argentine footballers also adopted this attitude towards the new playing style. Among them was Jorge Brown, who felt it made football more subtle and artistic, but also that it seemed to result in enthusiasm disappearing from the game. Most critics expressed concern about an excess of combination play and tricks, and a lack of shooting for goals.

[...] We founded the Uruguayan school of football, no coaches, no physical preparation, without sports medicine, without physiotherapists... Just us, just on the pitches of Uruguay, playing football from morning to afternoon, and evenings by moonlight. So we played, for twenty years, to learn the game, to become the players who were inside us, absolute masters of the ball, [...] to conquer the ball and no longer relinquish it. [...] Our game was a wild kind of football, it was an empirical, self-taught, homegrown style of football. It was a kind of football not yet seen in the Old World canons of football management. [...] That was our football, that is how our school of football arose, and that is how the football style for the entire New World came into being.

— Ondino Viera on the new style of football and its contrast with the original British gameplay.

=== First World Cup success ===
In 1924, Uruguay's football team traveled to France to showcase its game. Despite its success in Spain, spectators were not impressed with the style of play. Only 3,000 people attended the first match against Yugoslavia. After the 7–0 victory over the Yugoslavs, news of the Latin American prowess spread rapidly in Paris. The second-round 3–0 win against the United States attracted 10,000 supporters, made curious by the enthusiastic stories of the New World unknowns. On June 1, 1924, Uruguay met the French team in the quarterfinals. Over 40,000 spectators attended the match, which was the first confrontation with a Western European team. The French players, like the British, were masters of the long, high pass, and were able to cover long distances relatively fast. The Uruguayan players, in contrast, were experts in the short, quick pass, and were able to dribble at high speed. South American agility won over European physicality: Uruguay defeated the host country easily, going on to win its next two matches, again against European opponents.

At the 1924 Olympic Games, in addition to sport, various music and art competitions were held. Some musicians and writers sought inspiration from play in the football tournament. French essayist and novelist Henry de Montherlant, in one of his works, said of Uruguay's success, "A revelation! This is real football. In comparison, what we knew so far, what we played was nothing but the hobby of a schoolboy". Even skeptics had to acknowledge the seemingly unapproachable style of play. The then former French international player and later editor of L'Équipe, Gabriel Hanot, said of the difference between Uruguayan and British football that it was "like comparing an Arabian thoroughbred with a workhorse".

After the 1928 Olympic final Argentina and Uruguay met again, at the first World Cup final in 1930. Argentina lost 4–2. The media, trying to identify what differed between the two neighboring countries, concluded that the Uruguayan defense was better structured than Argentina's. Both countries played with their usual spontaneity and artistry, but Uruguay also kept defense in mind, where Argentina's individualistic style generated more confusion. Its defenders were no less capable than Uruguay's, but they lacked the tactical skill to intercept opposing attackers. An Italian journalist commented that although Argentina played graceful football, it was unable to succeed without compensating tactics. Argentina had not yet mastered an essential aspect of tactical play, and so lacked balance between attacking speed and agility on the one hand, and structured, well-conceived thought defense on the other. Throughout Latin America, British influence had almost disappeared. The European style was no longer considered obligatory, but rather as a way of playing football to compete against and to overcome. Discipline and structure were present, especially in Uruguayan football, but to a lesser extent than in Western Europe. The so-called Rioplatense football (Note: The term Rioplatense is often used to designate Argentina and Uruguay, which border on and are separated by the Río de la Plata. In this image, the Uruguayan capital, Montevideo, is visible at the upper left (north of the river), and Buenos Aires, the capital of Argentina, is at bottom right.) pulled crowds: fanaticism, unpredictability, sportsmanship, and speed attracted spectators in their masses to the stadiums. The difference with the Western football became increasingly apparent.

=== Brazilian style ===
==== Initial failure ====
As elsewhere in Latin America, Brazilian footballers learned to move individually and combine intelligently with fellow players. This combined football was reinforced by the influence of the Scottish Wanderers, founded in 1912 by Scottish immigrants. In Brazil, pairing this with other tactics to outplay the opponent was, remarkably, known as the sistema inglês ("English system"), when it was at odds with the British way of playing. Two Wanderers players were known nationally for their striking game. McLean and Hopkins played together on the left, performing series of quick and short passes, soon named tabelinha ("small graphics"). Although the Wanderers' playing style was considered too innovative, even revolutionary, the local footballers adopted it, over time achieving success.

In contrast to Argentina and Uruguay, where British influence declined rapidly, in Brazil the British community retained the most say in football culture for a relatively long time. Harry Welfare, who played for Liverpool F.C. before going to Rio de Janeiro to get started as a coach, taught the Fluminense FC players deep and wide passing technique. The members of these, and other, football clubs were exclusively Europeans. Welfare therefore did not explicitly introduce his game views to the local population. Brazilians did see the gameplay, however, watching training sessions from the roofs of buildings surrounding the football fields. For the local population, football proved a godsend. Cricket was difficult to play in the tight spaces of residential areas, but football was a possibility. Using homemade balls consisting mainly of collections of rags, they began to play in informal football parties. The Scot, McLean, was not impressed, voicing his dissatisfaction at the lack of discipline and convinced that "their antics in Scotland would never be accepted". The style of Brazilian football that was formed contrasts with the European style through a combination of surprise, cruelty, cunning and dexterity, together with genius and individual spontaneity. Dribbling is an essential part of Brazil's style.

Despite their "genius and individual spontaneity", Brazilian players were not successful abroad with their game. Unsurprisingly, given the inexperienced players of the selection, Brazil was rapidly eliminated from the first world tournament. Four years later, lack of experience was no longer a valid excuse. Although the squad had some very talented players, including Leônidas da Silva, it suffered the consequences of its naivety and inadequate preparation. The 8–4 loss in a friendly match against Yugoslavia, following the unsuccessful World Cup of 1934, made it painfully clear that at a tactical level Brazil lagged significantly behind not only its Latin American opponents but also the Eastern European countries. The biggest problem was the spaces between the lines: (Note: In football terminology, a "line" refers to the tactical disposition of a row of football players on a field. Normally there are three lines: defense, midfield and attack. In a specific gaming system, the number of players per line is specified. For example, a "5-3-2 system", with five defenders, three midfielders and two strikers. When the spaces between the lines are too big, usually this refers to lines which allow too much space for the opponents in that part of the field.) the Yugoslav team was able to use the large unoccupied areas of the field to deploy their own tactics, and without difficulty regularly breached the Brazilian midfield and defense. The Brazilian football community came to the realization that changes to its style of play were needed.

==== Development and success ====
WM formation, Uruguay vs Brazil, July 16, 1950

At the end of the 1930s, the previously unknown Brazilian Gentil Cardoso, who, as a jack-of-all-trades, had regularly travelled to Europe and devoted his free time to watching football, tried to introduce a new tactical system. He had witnessed the emergence of the so-called WM formation with English club Arsenal F.C., and saw this as the solution to the Brazilian football problem. In this system, the attackers deploy in a "W" formation, and the midfielders and defenders in an "M" formation" (3-2-2-3). This can be seen in the tactical set-up for the final between Brazil and Uruguay in 1950 (see right). The outside defenders, or full-backs, (in this arrangement, Bigode and Augusto) cover the wing-backs of the opposing team. The inner defense or half-backs (here Danilo and Bauer) face the back line of three defenders and counter attackers trying to breach the midfield defense; the stopper, or centre-back, (in this arrangement, Juvenal) stands between the two outside defenders and has the primary task of dealing with the opposing middle attacker or inside forward. Cardoso managed to secure a position as coach of a small Rio de Janeiro club. He introduced the formation and trained the players in it, but saw that the game did not correspond to the British variant that he had seen. Copying the British style of play turned out to be just not possible. Cardoso's attempt failed.

Brazil needed a European in order to achieve a definitive change in playing style, and found him in the form of Hungarian Izidor Kürschner. Kürschner accepted the offer made by the president of CR Flamengo in 1937, although he recognized the difficulty of his position as coach faced with the conservative attitude that the Brazilians had now developed in football, following the British example. Cardoso had tried to introduce the British WM formation; Kürschner, who had spent most of his football career in Switzerland, did not share that ambition. While he also called his system WM, the deployment was more of a WW formation. The stopper now played in front of the full-backs. The Hungarian's playing style was not popular, although the Brazilian Football Association asked him to accompany the national team to France in 1938, in the role of advisor. The system did not achieve success in the following years, with the 1950 FIFA World Cup the lowest point. Strikingly, the Brazilian team defeated opponents using a similar formation, but lost when faced with Uruguay's different tactics. Of note was the fact that Uruguay played with the same defensive intent Brazil had shown when it won the Copa América in 1919. The 1950 failure marked the final demise of the Brazilian WM formation. For years it was applied on the football pitch, but by 1966 it had disappeared from the tactics both of clubs and of the national team.

Between 1950 and 1966, Brazil was successful despite concern over its tactics, and won the World Cup in both 1958 and 1962. It had been understood that Brazilian football would sell itself short by choosing tactics over technique. As a result, national coaches gave players a lot of freedom and made the tactical arrangement as flexible as possible. In the 1960s and 1970s, the world's best players often from Brazil. To make the most of the qualities of players like Garrincha and Valdir Pereira, tactics were developed to provide enough room for the creativity and artistry that typified Latin American football. On the evening of the 1970 World Cup Final, João Saldanha, head coach during the qualification process, asked why he felt that the football played in Brazil was the best in the world. He suggested it was due to four factors:

1. Climate, which played an important role because in Brazil football could be played year-round;
2. Poverty, which had encouraged a competitive spirit in Brazilian youth;
3. Ethnic diversity, which he felt was a success factor in Brazilian society as a significant portion of the population was of African descent and had inherited a combative attitude from the past experience of slavery;
4. A "boundless passion for futebol", vital in achieving success in the second half of the twentieth century.

Brazil had only one distinctive football formation, the so-called 4–2–2 system, similar to the WW formation. But the Brazilian tactical approach cannot be reduced to this tactic alone. In 1994, for example, Brazil played with four defenders, four midfielders and two attackers; and in 2014 with five midfielders and one striker, Frederico Chaves Guedes (Fred). Currently, Brazil is not known for any particular formation, but rather for its frivolous and flexible players.

== Club football ==
Origins

Within just a few years of football being introduced into Latin America, a professional scene began to emerge. Two English immigrants, Thomas and James Hogg, organized a meeting in the Argentine capital on May 9, 1867, at which the first Latin American football club was established: the Buenos Aires Football Club. The Buenos Aires Cricket Club granted permission to the football club to use its cricket ground in Parque Tres de Febrero. Although the Buenos Aires Football club did not last, it paved the way for larger and more popular clubs to be established. For instance, River Plate, one of the most popular clubs in South America, was able to grow their roots in Buenos Aires in 1901 thanks to the Buenos Aires Football Club's influence.

=== Main clubs ===
In Brazil, historically 12 clubs are considered "big", although some others are also occasionally identified as big clubs, notably in their states of origin, including Atlético Paranaense. Those named in the lists with 12 clubs are: São Paulo, Palmeiras, Corinthians and Santos, all from the State of São Paulo; Fluminense, Flamengo, Vasco and Botafogo, all from the state of Rio de Janeiro; Internacional and Grêmio, from the state of Rio Grande do Sul, and Atlético Mineiro and Cruzeiro, from the state of Minas Gerais. In addition to these thirteen mentioned, Brazilian champion clubs are Bahia, Coritiba, Guarani and Sport, a total of 17 Brazilian Championship champion clubs, with Atlético Paranaense having had enormous growth in assets and income in the 21st Century, therefore being considered one of the greats of Brazilian football by much of the national press.

In Argentina, the main teams are considered to be Boca Juniors and River Plate. The country also has other important clubs with a high number of international achievements, such as Independiente, Estudiantes and Vélez Sarsfield, in addition to other important ones, such as Racing and San Lorenzo.

In Uruguay, the 2 historically most important teams are Peñarol and Nacional.

In Colombia, the biggest national champions are Atlético Nacional, Millonarios and América de Cali, the first being the most prominent in international competitions.

The biggest teams in Chile are Colo-Colo, Universidad de Chile and Universidad Católica.

In Ecuador, although historically teams like Emelec and Barcelona have been popular since ancient times, currently the ones that stand out are L.D.U. Quito and Independiente del Valle, who have achieved success in international competitions.

In Paraguay, the historically most important teams are Olimpia and Cerro Porteño, and then Libertad.

==== Popularity ====
The South American football clubs with at least 10 million followers on social media as of 1 January 2021:

#	Football club	Country	Followers
1	Flamengo	Brazil	37.4 million
2	SC Corinthians Paulista	Brazil	25.1 million
3	Boca Juniors	Argentina	18.7 million
4	River Plate	Argentina	17.6 million
5	São Paulo FC	Brazil	16.2 million
6	Palmeiras	Brazil	12.4 million

=== National competition ===
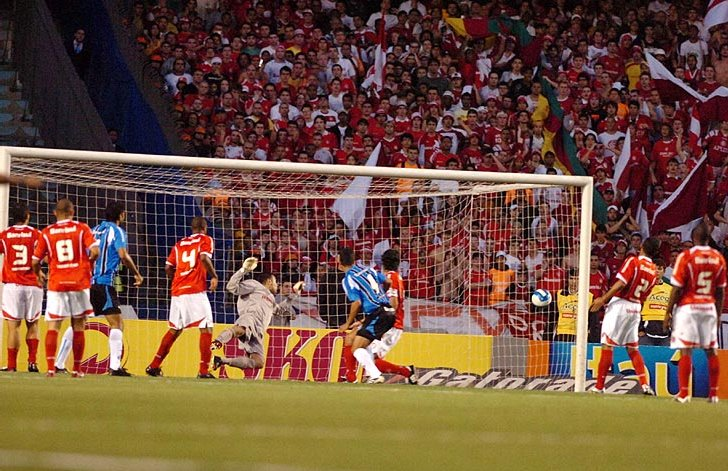
Grenal, one of the fiercest football rivalries in the world.

All Central American countries, and the great majority of South American countries (Note: In Central America, all countries have a formal system of Apertura and Clausura. South American countries that use the same system are Argentina, Bolivia, Chile, Colombia, Ecuador, Paraguay, Peru, Uruguay and Venezuela, as well as Caribbean country Haiti.) use a league system with two separate seasons, the Apertura ("opening") and Clausura ("closing"). Where in Europe the season runs continuously from autumn to spring (usually from August to May or June), in some Latin American countries the season follows the calendar year. This is the case in Chile, Colombia, Ecuador, Haiti, Paraguay, and Peru, where the season runs from January or February until the end of the year. The rest of Latin America is aligned with the European season.

In this system, both the first and the second half of the season yield a winner. In Nicaragua, Peru, Uruguay, and Venezuela, the two winning teams play each other at the end of the season to determine the ultimate champion. In addition to this general competition structure, with a season played in two separate halves, several countries show slight differences in their approach to promotion and relegation and the awarding of the championship title. In the Mexican league, at the beginning of each season the two previous season champions play each other in a small league competition similar to the Super Cup in European competition. In Costa Rica, where the terminology is Invierno ("winter") and Verano ("summer") rather than Apertura and Clausura, the top four teams of the two halves of the season qualify for a second round, in which the overall champion is determined.

Brazil does not divide the season into halves. Competition usually takes place from May to December, in accordance with the American seasonal calendar, but follows the same rules as in Europe. The system is fairly recent, as the country only moved from small local tournaments to a national competition in the 1960s and 1970s. The Campeonato Brasileiro is the biggest football competition in Latin America. It contains the greatest number of winners of the Copa Libertadores (clubs in this league have won the Copa seventeen times). Three clubs from the Campeonato have won the FIFA Club World Cup a total of four times between them. It is the highest valued competition in Latin America, at almost one and a half billion dollars. The football club with the highest brand value (as at 2012) was Sport Club Corinthians Paulista, with $77 million; worldwide, this put the club in twenty-fourth place, behind Everton F.C.

=== International competition ===
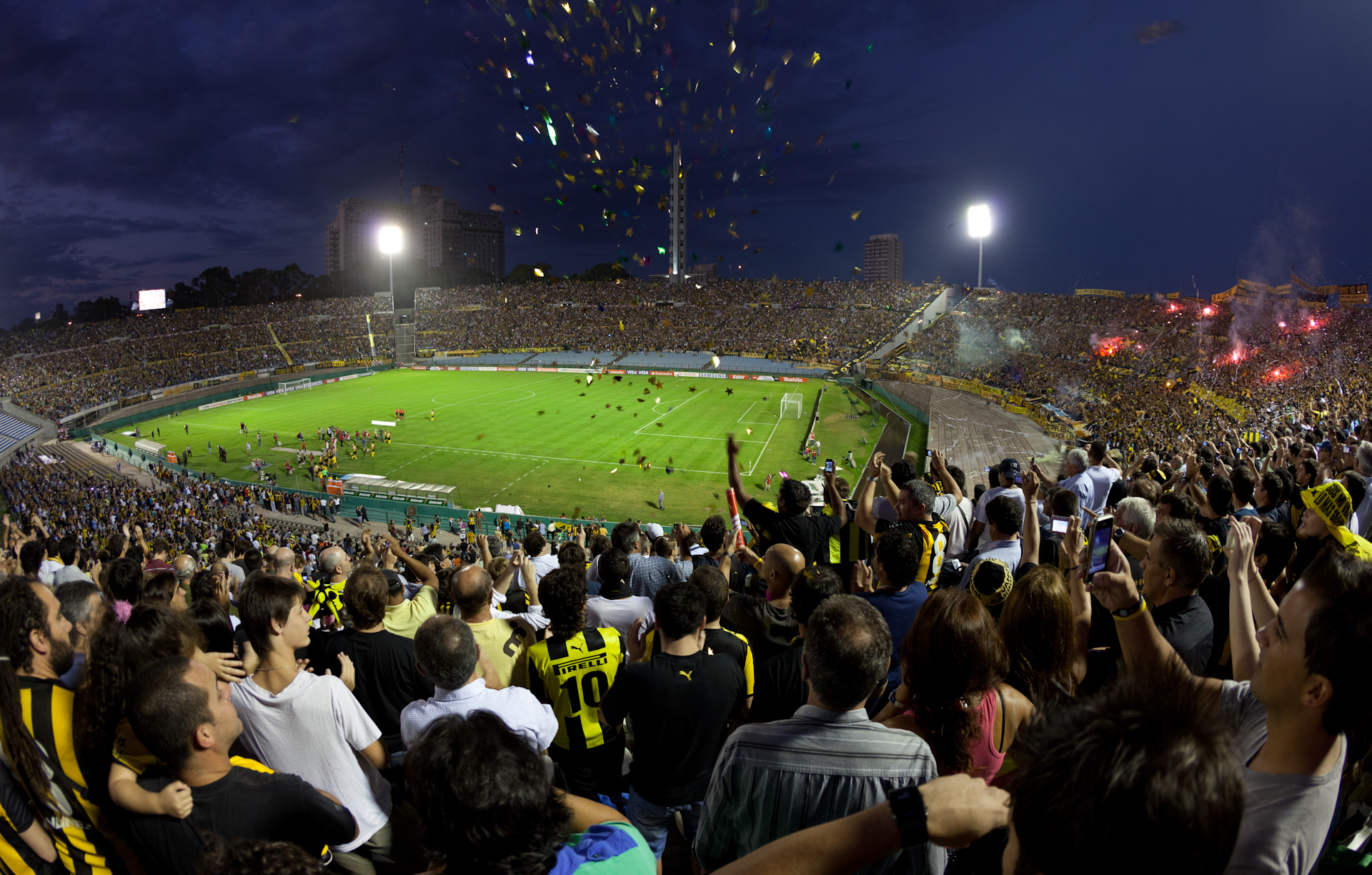
Peñarol supporters at the Centenario Stadium. Peñarol vs Liga de Quito, Copa Libertadores 2011.

Latin America has several international club competitions, the main tournaments being the Copa Libertadores and CONCACAF Champions League. Both serve as the qualifiers for the FIFA Club World Cup. In South America, the Copa Sudamericana, equivalent to the European UEFA Europa League, is the secondary tournament. The winner qualifies for the following season's Copa Libertadores. The Recopa Sudamericana, between the winners of the Copa Sudamericana and the Copa Libertadores, takes place in South America every year at the beginning of the new season. The CONCACAF region does not have such a system. Instead, the best three clubs in the Caribbean tournament, the CFU Club Championship, qualify for the main draw of the Champions League, and all countries on the Central American mainland are allocated a number of places at the pool stage by default. The most successful South American club is the Argentine club Independiente, with seven victories. Mexico's Cruz Azul has won the CONCACAF Champions League six times. In the Caribbean, most of the winning clubs have been from Trinidad and Tobago. Although Mexican clubs are welcome in the South American club competitions, there is currently no overlap between the two Latin American regions at club level. The two were to be joined in a Pan-American tournament, the Copa Pan-Americana, replacing the two formerly separate international club competitions from 2002. Six Brazilian clubs, and two from Panama and Costa Rica, were registered as participants, but financial difficulties forced the football associations to cancel the plan.

== International football ==
Both at club level and in international play, Central American football and South American football are treated as distinct entities. South American national teams participate in tournaments with no input from Central America and the Caribbean, and vice versa. There are two football confederations, CONCACAF and CONMEBOL, each holding its own tournaments, so far with no Pan-American tournament (a 1960s trial was not continued). CONMEBOL organized the first Copa América in 1916, known as the Campeonato Sudamericano de Fútbol. North America and Central America played in separate championships until the 1970s. CONCACAF brought the two together in the one tournament when it founded the CONCACAF Gold Cup in 1991. In South America, Uruguay won most often; in Central and North America, it was Mexico. Despite the clear separation between the two confederations, both tournaments have a tradition of inviting participants from outside their region. Four CONMEBOL member countries participated in the Gold Cup, and in the Copa América four CONCACAF countries were included. In addition to these two championships, of equivalent status to the European football championship in the UEFA region, qualifiers are held to determine participation of North, Central and South American countries in the World Cup. Unlike Central America, the CONMEBOL region does not apply a system of groups for the qualifiers, as it has a smaller number of member countries.

=== Rivalries ===
The most intense rivalry between any two countries at international level is between Argentina and Brazil. These encounters, of which there have been over one hundred, are similar in number to the matches between Argentina and Uruguay, but are now the most intense in South America. This is due not to past political conflict but to these countries being regarded as the greatest footballing nations of the Americas. During the twentieth century, this sporting hostility gave rise to several conflicts, culminating in brawling between players, supporters, and police during the final of the 1946 South American Championship. The Superclásico de las Américas, an annual friendly encounter between the national teams of Argentina and Brazil, was held for the first time in 2011.

Rivalry between Brazil and Uruguay also burgeoned following the World Cup final of 1950, when millions of Brazilian football fans were traumatized by a 1–2 defeat. In South America, Peru and Chile are also considered traditional rivals; the confrontation between the two nations is known as the Clásico del Pacífico, or Pacific Classic. This rivalry traces back to the 1890s, when the Saltpeter War was fought.

In the CONCACAF region, two historic "Clásico" encounters deserve mention. While the Mexico national team is traditionally dominant in North and Central America, in CONCACAF tournaments it is seeing increasing competition from its traditional rival and northern neighbour from outside the Latin American region, the United States. Mexican resolve is strengthened by such events as the Battle of the Alamo and Mexican–American War in the nineteenth century, and the treatment of Mexicans living in the United States. Honduras and Costa Rica have been playing each other since April 3, 1935, in encounters known as the Clásico centroamericano, or Central American Classic. The two countries, which played against each other for the 50th time in January 2011, are fairly evenly matched in terms of number of wins, although Costa Rica has been the more successful internationally.

== Organization ==
=== Domestic ===
==== CONMEBOL ====
- Argentina: Primera División Argentina, governed by the Argentine Football Association
- Bolivia: Liga de Fútbol Profesional Boliviano, governed by the Bolivian Football Federation
- Brazil: Campeonato Brasileiro Série A, governed by the Brazilian Football Confederation
- Chile: Primera División de Chile, governed by the Chilean Football Federation
- Colombia: Categoría Primera A, governed by the Colombian Football Federation
- Ecuador: Campeonato Ecuatoriano de Fútbol, governed by the Ecuadorian Football Federation
- Paraguay: Primera División Paraguaya, governed by the Paraguayan Football Association
- Peru: Torneo Descentralizado, organized by the Peruvian Football Federation
- Uruguay: Campeonato Uruguayo de Fútbol, governed by the Uruguayan Football Association
- Venezuela: Primera División Venezolana, governed by the Venezuelan Football Federation

==== CONCACAF ====
- Guyana: GFF National Super League, organized by the Guyana Football Federation
- Suriname: Suriname Hoofdklasse, organized by the Surinaamse Voetbal Bond
- (France) French Guiana: French Guiana Championnat National, organized by the French Guiana Football League (Note: French Guiana is in italics as it is a French overseas department and so cannot affiliate with FIFA.)

=== International ===
- FIFA Club World Cup

==== CONCACAF ====
- CONCACAF Caribbean Cup
- CONCACAF Champions League

==== CONMEBOL ====
- Copa Libertadores, major club competition of South America, with the champions qualifying for the FIFA Club World Cup
- Copa Sudamericana, second major club competition of South America, with the champions qualifying for the Copa Libertadores.
- Recopa Sudamericana, the meeting of the Copa Libertadores and the Copa Sudamericana champions.

== Attendances ==
The CONMEBOL clubs with an average home league attendance of at least 20,000 in the 2024-25 and 2025 seasons:

#	Club	Country	Average
1	River Plate	Argentina	84,782
2	Flamengo	Brazil	58,732
3	Talleres	Argentina	52,624
4	Boca Juniors	Argentina	52,478
5	Racing Club	Argentina	50,180
6	Rosario Central	Argentina	46,755
7	San Lorenzo	Argentina	46,349
8	Independiente	Argentina	45,414
9	Cruzeiro	Brazil	44,089
10	Newell's Old Boys	Argentina	42,000
11	Corinthians	Brazil	40,074
12	Universitario	Peru	38,833
13	CA Belgrano	Argentina	38,393
14	EC Bahia	Brazil	38,184
15	Atlético Nacional	Colombia	34,231
16	Estudiantes de La Plata	Argentina	32,384
17	Huracán	Argentina	30,275
18	DIM	Colombia	29,010
19	São Paulo FC	Brazil	28,670
20	GELP	Argentina	28,290
21	Atlético Mineiro	Brazil	27,586
22	Fortaleza EC	Brazil	27,066
23	Atlético Tucumán	Argentina	26,652
24	Millonarios	Colombia	26,634
25	CA Unión	Argentina	26,491
26	Grêmio	Brazil	25,584
27	Alianza Lima	Peru	24,548
28	Vélez Sarsfield	Argentina	24,364
29	Internacional	Brazil	23,609
30	Independiente Rivadavia	Argentina	23,147
31	Remo	Brazil	22,926
32	Vasco da Gama	Brazil	22,265
33	Coritiba	Brazil	22,207
34	Vitória	Brazil	22,167
35	CA Banfield	Argentina	20,273

Sources: League pages on Wikipedia
