= Juan Bascuñán =

Chilean long-distance runner (1894–1973)

Personal information
- Born: Juan de Dios Jorquera Bascuñán; 8 July 1894 Santiago, Chile
- Died: 29 August 1973 (aged 79) Quilicura, Chile
- Height: 5 ft 6 in (168 cm)
- Weight: 161 lb (73 kg)

Sport
- Sport: Long-distance running
- Event: Marathon
Medal record
Men's athletics
Representing Chile
South American Championships
Gold medal – first place	1918 Buenos Aires	Mile
Gold medal – first place	1918 Buenos Aires	Marathon
Gold medal – first place	1920 Santiago	5000 m
Gold medal – first place	1920 Santiago	10,000 m

Juan de Dios Jorquera Bascuñán (8 July 1894 – 29 August 1973) was a Chilean middle-distance and long-distance runner. At the first unofficial South American Championships in Athletics in Buenos Aires, he had won gold medals in the marathon (Note: Course had measured below the standard marathon distance of 42.195 kilometres (26.219 mi).) and the mile run with times of 3:28:04 and 4:37.8 respectively.

He then competed at the 1920 South American Championships in Athletics held in Santiago. He had won the men's 5000 metres and 10,000 metres with times of 16:11.4 and 33:13.6. There, he had set championship records in both of the distances.

Jorquera was part of the Chilean team at the 1920 Summer Olympics in Antwerp, Belgium. He competed in the men's marathon on 22 August against a field of 47 other competitors. He had run in a time of 3:17:45.0 and had placed 33rd out of the 35 competitors that completed the course. Though he remained active in the sport, he could not compete at the 1924 Summer Olympics and 1928 Summer Olympics as he had begun receiving money for races and was deemed as a professional athlete and not an amateur one.

He later died on 29 August 1973 in Quilicura, Chile.
