= List of South American Championships in Athletics records =

The South American Championships in Athletics is an athletics event which began in 1919. Records set by athletes who are representing one of the CONSUDATLE's member states.

== Men's records ==
| Event | Record | Athlete | Nationality | Date | Meet | Place | Ref. |
|---|---|---|---|---|---|---|---|
| 100 m | 9.89 (+0.8 m/s) AR | Issamade Asinga | Suriname | 28 July 2023 | 2023 Championships | São Paulo, Brazil | |
| 200 m | 20.19 (+0.7 m/s) | Issamade Asinga | Suriname | 30 July 2023 | 2023 Championships | São Paulo, Brazil | |
| 400 m | 44.79 | Lucas Carvalho | Brazil | 29 July 2023 | 2023 Championships | São Paulo, Brazil | |
| 800 m | 1:45.62 | Thiago André | Brazil | 31 May 2021 | 2021 Championships | Guayaquil, Ecuador | |
| 1500 m | 3:36.47 | Hudson Santos de Souza | Brazil | May 2001 | 2001 Championships | Manaus, Brazil | |
| 5000 m | 13:50.08 | Altobeli da Silva | Brazil | 26 May 2019 | 2019 Championships | Lima, Peru | |
| 10,000 m | 28:30.80 | Byron Piedra | Ecuador | 14 June 2015 | 2015 Championships | Lima, Peru | |
| 110 m hurdles | 13.35 (+0.7 m/s) | Rafael Pereira | Brazil | 30 May 2021 | 2021 Championships | Guayaquil, Ecuador | |
| 400 m hurdles | 48.63 | Eronilde Nunes de Araújo | Brazil | May 1995 | 1995 Championships | Manaus, Brazil | |
| 3000 m steeplechase | 8:29.53 | Gerard Giraldo | Colombia | 14 June 2015 | 2015 Championships | Lima, Peru | |
| High jump | 2.31 m NR | Eure Yáñez | Venezuela | 23 June 2017 | 2017 Championships | Luque, Paraguay | |
| Pole vault | 5.83 m | Thiago Braz | Brazil | 5 July 2013 | 2013 Championships | Cartagena, Colombia | |
| Long jump | 8.29 m (+0.6 m/s) NR | Arnovis Dalmero | Colombia | 28 July 2023 | 2023 Championships | São Paulo, Brazil | |
| Triple jump | 17.24 m (+0.6 m/s) | Almir dos Santos | Brazil | 28 July 2023 | 2023 Championships | São Paulo, Brazil | |
| Shot put | 21.02 m | Darlan Romani | Brazil | 24 June 2017 | 2017 Championships | Luque, Paraguay | |
| Discus throw | 64.13 m | Claudio Romero | Chile | 26 April 2025 | 2025 Championships | Mar del Plata, Argentina | |
| Hammer throw | 75.92 m | Humberto Mansilla | Chile | 28 July 2023 | 2023 Championships | São Paulo, Brazil | |
| Javelin throw | 81.22 m | Júlio César de Oliveira | Brazil | 12 June 2015 | 2015 Championships | Lima, Peru | |
| Decathlon | 8058 pts | José Fernando Ferreira | Brazil | 28–29 July 2023 | 2023 Championships | São Paulo, Brazil | |
| Decathlon | 100m / Long jump / Shot put / High jump / 400m / 110m H / Discus / Pole vault / Javelin / 1500m; 10.91 (−0.4 m/s) / 7.16 m (+1.1 m/s) / 13.46 m / 1.90 m / 49.13 / 14.00 (−0.1 m/s) / 45.61 m / 4.90 m / 67.83 m / 4:58.04 | | | | | | |
| 20,000 m walk (track) | 1:20:23.8 h AR | Andrés Chocho | Ecuador | 5 June 2011 | 2011 Championships | Buenos Aires, Argentina | |
| 20 km walk (road) | 1:21:26 | Luis Henry Campos | Peru | 26 April 2025 | 2025 Championships | Mar del Plata, Argentina | |
| 4 × 100 m relay | 38.46 A | Raphael de Oliveira; Claudinei da Silva; Édson Ribeiro; André Domingos da Silva | Brazil | June 1999 | 1999 Championships | Bogotá, Colombia | |
| 4 × 400 m relay | 3:02.09 A | Eronilde Nunes de Araújo; Anderson Dos Santos; Inácio Leão; Cleverson da Silva | Brazil | June 1999 | 1999 Championships | Bogotá, Colombia | |

Key:
| ^{WR} World record | ^{AR} South American record | ^{NR} National record | ^{A} affected by altitude |

== Women's records ==
| Event | Record | Athlete | Nationality | Date | Meet | Place | Ref. |
|---|---|---|---|---|---|---|---|
| 100 m | 11.17 A (+0.3 m/s) | Lucimar Aparecida de Moura | Brazil | June 1999 | 1999 Championships | Bogotá, Colombia | |
| 100 m | 11.17 (+0.7 m/s) | Vitoria Rosa | Brazil | 28 July 2023 | 2023 Championships | São Paulo, Brazil | |
| 200 m | 22.60 A (+1.6 m/s) | Lucimar Aparecida de Moura | Brazil | June 1999 | 1999 Championships | Bogotá, Colombia | |
| 400 m | 50.63 | Evelis Aguilar | Colombia | 25 April 2025 | 2025 Championships | Mar del Plata, Argentina | |
| 800 m | 2:00.04 | Luciana de Paula Mendes | Brazil | May 2001 | 2001 Championships | Manaus, Brazil | |
| 1500 m | 4:10.14 | Muriel Coneo | Colombia | 12 June 2015 | 2015 Championships | Lima, Peru | |
| 5000 m | 15:39.67 | Fabiana Cristine da Silva | Brazil | 2 June 2011 | 2011 Championships | Buenos Aires, Argentina | |
| 10,000 m | 31:59.11 | Simone da Silva | Brazil | 5 June 2011 | 2011 Championships | Buenos Aires, Argentina | |
| 100 m hurdles | 12.71 AR | Maurren Higa Maggi | Brazil | May 2001 | 2001 Championships | Manaus, Brazil | |
| 400 m hurdles | 55.68 | Melissa Gonzalez | Colombia | 31 May 2021 | 2021 Championships | Guayaquil, Ecuador | |
| 3000 m steeplechase | 9:38.71 | Tatiane Raquel da Silva | Brazil | 30 May 2021 | 2021 Championships | Guayaquil, Ecuador | |
| High jump | 1.93 m | Caterine Ibargüen | Colombia | 22 July 2005 | 2005 Championships | Cali, Colombia | |
| Pole vault | 4.70 m | Fabiana Murer | Brazil | 2 June 2011 | 2011 Championships | Buenos Aires, Argentina | |
| Long jump | 7.26 m A (+1.8 m/s) | Maurren Higa Maggi | Brazil | June 1999 | 1999 Championships | Bogotá, Colombia | |
| Triple jump | 14.57 m | Keila Costa | Brazil | June 2007 | 2007 Championships | São Paulo, Brazil | |
| Shot put | 19.02 m A | Elisângela Maria Adriano | Brazil | June 1999 | 1999 Championships | Bogotá, Colombia | |
| Discus throw | 64.68 m | Andressa de Morais | Brazil | 23 June 2017 | 2017 Championships | Luque, Paraguay | |
| Hammer throw | 72.70 m | Jennifer Dahlgren | Argentina | 2 June 2011 | 2011 Championships | Buenos Aires, Argentina | |
| Javelin throw | 62.32 m | Jucilene de Lima | Brazil | 25 April 2025 | 2025 Championships | Mar del Plata, Argentina | |
| Heptathlon | 6396 pts | Martha Araújo | Colombia | 26–27 April 2025 | 2025 Championships | Mar del Plata, Argentina | |
| Heptathlon | 100m H / High jump / Shot put / 200m / Long jump / Javelin / 800m; 13.13 (+2.5 m/s) / 1.73 m / 13.55 m / 24.43 (+2.3 m/s) / 6.55 m (+1.4 m/s) / 47.62 m / 2:17.38 | | | | | | |
| 20,000 m walk (track) | 1:29:07.5 AR | Mary Luz Andía | Peru | 28 July 2023 | 2023 Championships | São Paulo, Brazil | |
| 20 km walk (road) | 1:28:30 | Viviane Lyra | Brazil | 26 April 2025 | 2025 Championships | Mar del Plata, Argentina | |
| 4 × 100 m relay | 43.12 | Franciela Krasucki; Ana Cláudia Lemos; Vitória Cristina Rosa; Rosângela Santos | Brazil | 24 June 2017 | 2017 Championships | Luque, Paraguay | |
| 4 × 400 m relay | 3:28.64 | Maria Laura Almirão; Josiane Tito; Lucimar Teodoro; Geisa Coutinho | Brazil | 22 June 2003 | 2003 Championships | Barquisimeto, Venezuela | |

== Mixed records ==
| Event | Record | Athlete | Nationality | Date | Meet | Place | Ref. |
|---|---|---|---|---|---|---|---|
| 4 × 400 m relay | 3:14.79 NR | Jhon Perlaza; Lina Licona; Anthony Zambrano; Evelis Aguilar | Colombia | 28 July 2023 | 2023 Championships | São Paulo, Brazil | |

Key:
| ^{WR} World record | ^{AR} South American record | ^{NR} National record | ^{A} affected by altitude |

== Records in defunct events ==
=== Men's events ===
| Event | Record | Name | Nation | Date | Meet | Place | Ref. |
|---|---|---|---|---|---|---|---|
| 3000 m | 8:32.4 h | Raúl Inostroza | Chile | 1943 | 1943 Championships | Santiago, Chile | |
| Half marathon | 1:08:54 | Osvaldo Suárez | Argentina | 1956 | 1956 Championships | Buenos Aires, Argentina | |
| Marathon | 2:12:09 | Héctor Rodríguez | Colombia | 1975 | 1975 Championships | Rio de Janeiro, Brazil | |
| 200 m hurdles | 26.2 h | Harold Rosenqvist | Chile | 1920 | 1920 Championships | Santiago, Chile | |
| Standing high jump | 1.44 m | Juan Moliné | Argentina | 1920 | 1920 Championships | Santiago, Chile | |
| Standing long jump | 3.07 m | Hugo Krumm | Chile | 1919 | 1919 Championships | Montevideo, Uruguay | |
| 20 km walk (road) | 1:24:12 | Héctor Moreno | Colombia | 1983 | 1983 Championships | Santa Fe, Argentina | |

=== Women's events ===
| Event | Record | Name | Nation | Date | Meet | Place | Ref. |
|---|---|---|---|---|---|---|---|
| 3000 m | 9:17.50 | Carmem de Oliveira | Brazil | 1991 | 1991 Championships | Manaus, Brazil | |
| 80 metres hurdles | 11.0 h A NWI | Carlota Ulloa | Chile | 1969 | 1969 Championships | Quito, Ecuador | |
| Pentathlon | 4422 pts A | Aída dos Santos | Brazil | 1969 | 1969 Championships | Quito, Ecuador | |
| 10,000 m walk (track) | 46:01.06 | Miriam Ramón | Ecuador | 1997 | 1997 Championships | Mar del Plata, Argentina | |

== See also ==
- List of South American records in athletics
