= List of cricket grounds in Argentina =

This is a list of cricket grounds in Argentina. The grounds included in this list have held first-class matches.

Official name (known as)	City or town	Capacity	Notes	Ref
Estadio Belgrano Athletic	Buenos Aires	Unknown	Has held six first-class matches, all of which took place between 1927 and 1938	
Buenos Aires Cricket Club Ground	Buenos Aires	Unknown	Held two first-class matches, one in 1912 and another in 1927, both featuring Argentina playing the Marylebone Cricket Club. Defunct as a cricket venue since 1951	
Hurlingham Club Ground	Buenos Aires	Unknown	Has held five first-class matches, all of which took place between 1912 and 1938	
Lomas Athletic Cricket Ground	Buenos Aires	Unknown	Held one first-class match in 1912 between Argentina and the Marylebone Cricket Club	
St. George's College	Buenos Aires	Unknown	Marylebone Cricket Club played '2001 tour of Argentina'	
St. Alban's Club	Buenos Aires	Unknown	First used in the 2000 South American Championship, held Americas Division Two in 2006 and Division Three in 2008	
