= 1919 South American Championships in Athletics =

- Dates: 11–13 April
- Host city: Montevideo, Uruguay

The 1919 South American Championships in Athletics was the inaugural South American Championships and was contested by Uruguay and Chile were held in Montevideo, Uruguay between 11 and 13 April.

== Medal summary ==
=== Men's events ===
Event	Gold		Silver		Bronze	
100 metres	Henry Bowles; Uruguay	11.8	Marcelo Uranga; Chile	12.0	Ricardo Müller; Chile	12.1
200 metres	Isabelino Gradín; Uruguay	23.2	Julio Gorlero; Uruguay	23.4	Ricardo Müller; Chile	23.8
400 metres	Isabelino Gradín; Uruguay	52.4	Armando Camus; Chile	53.0	Carlos Stevens; Chile	54.6
800 metres	Juan Campos; Uruguay	2:04.8	Armando Camus; Chile	2:06.4	Carlos Stevens; Chile	2:07.0
1500 metres	Juan Baeza; Chile	4:29.8	Manuel Moraga; Chile	4:30.0	Enrique Calderón; Chile	4:31.4
10,000 metres	Gilberto Martínez; Uruguay	33:57.0	Juan Baeza; Chile	34:41.2	Enrique Calderón; Chile	34:55.6
110 metres hurdles	Harold Rosenqvist; Chile	17.0	Julio Kilián; Chile	17.2	Adolfo Reccius; Chile	18.0
200 metres hurdles	Julio Kilián; Chile	27.2	Adolfo Reccius; Chile	-	Harold Rosenqvist; Chile	28.0
400 metres hurdles	Julio Kilián; Chile	59.2	Adolfo Reccius; Chile	61.4	Andrés Mazzali; Uruguay	62.0
4 × 400 metres relay	Chile; Julio Killian; Armando Camus; Ricardo Müller; Carlos Stevens	3:39.0	Uruguay; Julio Gorlero; Mario Herrera; Eduardo Venancio Flores; Isabelino Gradín	3:39.4		
High jump	Carlos Patiño; Uruguay	1.72	Hernán Orrego; Chile	1.70	Arturo Filloy; Uruguay	1.68
Standing high jump	Carlos Patiño; Uruguay	1.40	Carlos Fernández; Uruguay	1.38	Arturo Filloy; Uruguay	1.38
Pole vault	Eugen Fonck; Chile	3.20	José Amejeiras; Uruguay	3.15	Héctor Berruti; Uruguay	3.15
Long jump	Ricardo Müller; Chile	6.68	Adolfo Reccius; Chile	6.53	Ricardo Filloy; Uruguay	6.47
Standing long jump	Hugo Krumm; Chile	3.07	Carlos Patiño; Uruguay	2.95	Ernesto Ramón; Uruguay	2.91
Shot put	Teodoro Scheihing; Chile	11.47	Víctor Zaragoza; Uruguay	11.22	Harold Rosenqvist; Chile	10.95
Discus throw	Alberto Warnken; Chile	35.80	Leonardo de Lucca; Uruguay	33.68	Fernando Capellini; Uruguay	33.44
Hammer throw	Leonardo de Lucca; Uruguay	32.57	Evaldo Homberg; Chile	31.97	Teodoro Scheihing; Chile	30.40
Javelin throw	Arturo Medina; Chile	45.95	Fernando Capellini; Uruguay	43.27	Evaldo Homberg; Chile	40.50

== Medal table ==
Rank	Nation	Gold	Silver	Bronze	Total
1	Chile (CHI)	11	11	11	33
2	Uruguay (URU)	8	8	7	23
Totals (2 entries)		19	19	18	56
