= Chile at the 1920 Summer Olympics =

- IOC code: CHI
- NOC: Chilean Olympic Committee

in Antwerp
- Competitors: 2 in 1 sport
- Flag bearer: Arturo Medina
- Medals: Gold 0 Silver 0 Bronze 0 Total 0

Summer Olympics appearances (overview)
- 1896; 1900–1908; 1912; 1920; 1924; 1928; 1932; 1936; 1948; 1952; 1956; 1960; 1964; 1968; 1972; 1976; 1980; 1984; 1988; 1992; 1996; 2000; 2004; 2008; 2012; 2016; 2020; 2024

Chile at the 1920 Summer Olympics in Antwerp, Belgium was the nation's third appearance out of six editions of the Summer Olympic Games.

== Athletics ==
The best result for the team was MacKey's? 16th-place finish in the javelin qualifying events.

Ranks given are within the heat.

| Athlete | Event | Heats | | Quarterfinals | | Semifinals | | Final | |
| Athlete | Event | Result | Rank | Result | Rank | Result | Rank | Result | Rank |
|---|---|---|---|---|---|---|---|---|---|
| Juan Bascuñán | Marathon | N/A | | | | | | 3:17:47.0 | 33 |

| Athlete | Event | Qualifying | | Final | |
| Athlete | Event | Result | Rank | Result | Rank |
|---|---|---|---|---|---|
| Arturo Medina | Javelin throw | 43.9 | 16 | did not advance | |
