= 1918 South American Championships in Athletics (unofficial) =

Unofficial South American Championships in Athletics
- Dates: May 24–26, 1918
- Host city: Buenos Aires, Argentina
- Level: Senior
- Events: 17
- Participation: 3 nations

Unofficial South American Championships in Athletics were held in Buenos Aires, Argentina on May 24–26, 1918. The event was entitled "Campeonato de Iniciación". It was organized by the "Federación Pedestre Argentina", the predecessor of the "Federación Atlética Argentina" (founded in 1919) and the "Confederación Argentina de Atletismo" (founded in 1954), and was then representing Argentinian athletics.

In a historical meeting on May 24, 1918, in the "salón de honor" (hall of fame) of the newspaper "La Razón", its director, Eloy María Prieto, together with Leopoldo Falconi, Carlos Fanta and Alfredo Betteley, representatives from Chile, and Dr. Francisco Ghigliani, representative from Uruguay, decided the foundation of the Confederación Sudamericana de Atletismo nowadays known as ConSudAtle.

== Medal summary ==
Medal winners are published.

=== Men ===
Event	Gold		Silver		Bronze	
100 metres	Marcelo Uranga (CHI)	12.0	José Pozzi (ARG)		Abelardo Piovano (ARG)	
200 metres	Marcelo Uranga (CHI)	24.2	Eduardo Lambierto (ARG)		Isabelino Gradín (URU)	
400 metres	Isabelino Gradín (URU)	53.0	José Pozzi (ARG)		Marcelo Uranga (CHI)	
800 metres	Manuel Moraga (CHI)	2:14.0	J.M. Martínez (ARG)		Juan Campos (URU)	
1 Mile	Juan Jorquera (CHI)	4:37.8	Manuel Moraga (CHI)		A.R. Arriola (ARG)	
Marathon*	Juan Jorquera (CHI)	3:28:04	Luis Urzua (CHI)		Ernesto Lamilla (CHI)	
200 metres hurdles	Marcelo Rendic (CHI)	30.8	Carlos Bovo (ARG)		Harold Rosenqvist (CHI)	
400 metres hurdles	Leopoldo Palma (CHI)		Julio Kilián (CHI)		Harold Rosenqvist (CHI)	
High jump	Miguel Arigós (ARG); Marcelo Rendic (CHI)	1.70			Luis Groussac (ARG)	
Standing high jump	Enrique Kossow (ARG)	1.45	Juan Moliné (ARG)	1.45	Luis Groussac (ARG)	1.45
Pole vault	Enrique Sansot (CHI)	3.15	Adolfo Reccius (CHI)	3.10	Héctor Berruti (URU)	3.10
Long jump	Harold Rosenqvist (CHI)	5.95	Adolfo Reccius (CHI)	5.89	E. Servetti (URU)	5.78
Standing long jump	S. Delpech (ARG)	2.905	Enrique Kossow (ARG)	2.89	Juan Moliné (ARG)	2.81
Shot put	Juan Moliné (ARG)	11.83	Miguel Arigós (ARG)	11.65	Víctor Zaragoza (URU)	11.35
Discus throw	Rodolfo Hammersley (CHI)	30.29	L. Heber (ARG)	29.93	Harold Rosenqvist (CHI)	29.57
Hammer throw	Fernando Capellini (URU)	26.70	Rodolfo Hammersley (CHI)	25.40	Carlo Heller (CHI)	20.57
4×400 metres relay	Argentina		Uruguay		Chile	

* = Actual distance was 40.2 km

== Medal table (unofficial) ==
* Host nation (Argentina)

Rank	Nation	Gold	Silver	Bronze	Total
1	Chile (CHI)	11	6	7	24
2	Argentina (ARG)*	5	10	4	19
3	Uruguay (URU)	2	1	5	8
Totals (3 entries)		18	17	16	51
