= 1920 South American Championships in Athletics =

- Dates: 23–25 April
- Host city: Santiago, Chile

The 1920 South American Championships in Athletics were held in Santiago, Chile between 23 and 25 April.

== Medal summary ==
=== Men's events ===
Event	Gold		Silver		Bronze	
100 metres	Marcelo Uranga; Chile	10.8 CR, AR	Julio Gorlero; Uruguay	11.0	Humberto Ramírez; Chile	
200 metres	Isabelino Gradín; Uruguay	22.4 CR, AR	Humberto Ramírez; Chile	22.6	Julio Gorlero; Uruguay	23.4
400 metres	Isabelino Gradín; Uruguay	54.0	Eduardo Flores; Uruguay	54.6	Gavino Reginato; Chile	
800 metres	Enrique Thompson; Argentina	2:06.2	Juan Campos; Uruguay	2:06.4	Carlos Escobar; Chile	2:06.8
1500 metres	Ángel Entrecasas; Argentina	4:23.2 CR	Juan Marshall; Chile	4:23.4	Oscar Guajardo; Chile	4:26.2
5000 metres	Juan Jorquera; Chile	16:11.4 CR	Manuel Moraga; Chile	16:21.8	Manuel Plaza; Chile	16:29.4
10,000 metres	Juan Jorquera; Chile	33:13.6 CR	Manuel Plaza; Chile	33:18.2	Enrique Calderón; Chile	
110 metres hurdles	Harold Rosenqvist; Chile	16.4 CR	Carlos Patiño; Uruguay	16.6	Otto Dietsch; Argentina	
200 metres hurdles	Harold Rosenqvist; Chile	26.2 CR	Andrés Mazzali; Uruguay	26.8	Francisco Silveira; Uruguay	
400 metres hurdles	Andrés Mazali; Uruguay	59.0 CR	Eduardo Diez; Chile	59.8	Francisco Silveira; Uruguay	
4 × 400 metres relay	Uruguay; Mario Herrera; Eduardo Venancio Flores; Francesco Silveira; Isabelino Gradín	3:34.0 CR	Argentina; Agustín Garay; José Pozzi; Enrique Thompson; Teodoro Borschmann			
High jump	Hernán Orrego; Chile	1.76 CR	Carlos Patiño; Uruguay	1.75	Osvaldo Kolbach; Chile	1.70
Standing high jump	Juan Moliné; Argentina	1.44 CR	Carlos Asiadacz; Chile	1.43	Carlos Fernández; Uruguay	1.42
Pole vault	Héctor Berruti; Uruguay	3.26 CR	Ernesto Goycolea; Chile	3.25	Enrique Sansot; Chile	3.20
Long jump	Ricardo Müller; Chile	6.52	Fortunato Antola; Uruguay	6.11	Héctor Benapres; Chile	6.10
Standing long jump	Francisco Japke; Chile	3.00	Hernán Orrego; Chile	2.98	Juan Moliné; Argentina	2.95
Triple jump	Adolfo Reccius; Chile	13.40 CR	Héctor Benapres; Chile	13.21	Erwin Gevert; Chile	12.69
Shot put	Benigno Rodríguez; Argentina	11.96 CR	Teodoro Scheihing; Chile	11.54	Jorge Llobet Cullen; Argentina	11.50
Discus throw	Jorge Llobet Cullen; Argentina	35.28	David Martín Estévez; Uruguay	34.64	Gustavo Krüger; Chile	34.55
Hammer throw	Leonardo de Lucca; Uruguay	34.14 CR	Jorge Llobet Cullen; Argentina	33.05	Teodoro Scheihing; Chile	32.97
Javelin throw	Arturo Medina; Chile	49.49 CR	Héctor Berruti; Uruguay	41.51	Alberto Asenjo; Chile	40.90

== Medal table ==
Rank	Nation	Gold	Silver	Bronze	Total
1	Chile (CHI)	10	10	13	33
2	Uruguay (URU)	6	9	4	19
3	Argentina (ARG)	5	2	3	10
Totals (3 entries)		21	21	20	62
