= Rodolfo Hammersley =

Chilean high jumper

Rodolfo Hammersley Hempel (June 10, 1889 – May 28, 1966) was a Chilean track and field athlete who competed in the 1912 Summer Olympics.

He was born in Valparaíso, the son of Robert Hammersley from Islington, London, and Emma Marie Hempel. He was the father of tennis player Andrés Hammersley and alpine skier Arturo Hammersley.

Hammersley was a generalist in track and field, practising a wide variety of events. In 1910, he was timed at 10.4 seconds for the 100 metres, which would have equalled the world record at that time.

In the 1912 Summer Olympics, he finished 13th in the standing high jump event and 28th in the high jump competition. This made Hammersley part of Chile's first official delegation to the Olympics.

At the 1918 South American Championships in Athletics – the first such gathering in the region – he won the discus throw event. He was runner-up in the hammer throw as well.
