= Buenos Aires Football Club =

Argentinian former football & rugby union club, based in Buenos Aires

Buenos Aires FC
- Full name: Buenos Aires Football Club
- Founded: 9 May 1867
- Dissolved: c. 1881; 145 years ago
- Ground: Buenos Aires Cricket Club
- Chairman: Thomas Hogg
- League: (none)

The Buenos Aires Football Club (frequently abbreviated as "BAFC") was an Argentine club from Buenos Aires, considered the first to play any form of football club not only in Argentina but in South America.

The club was established by a group of railway workers and during its existence, it repeatedly switched from association to rugby football codes.

== History ==
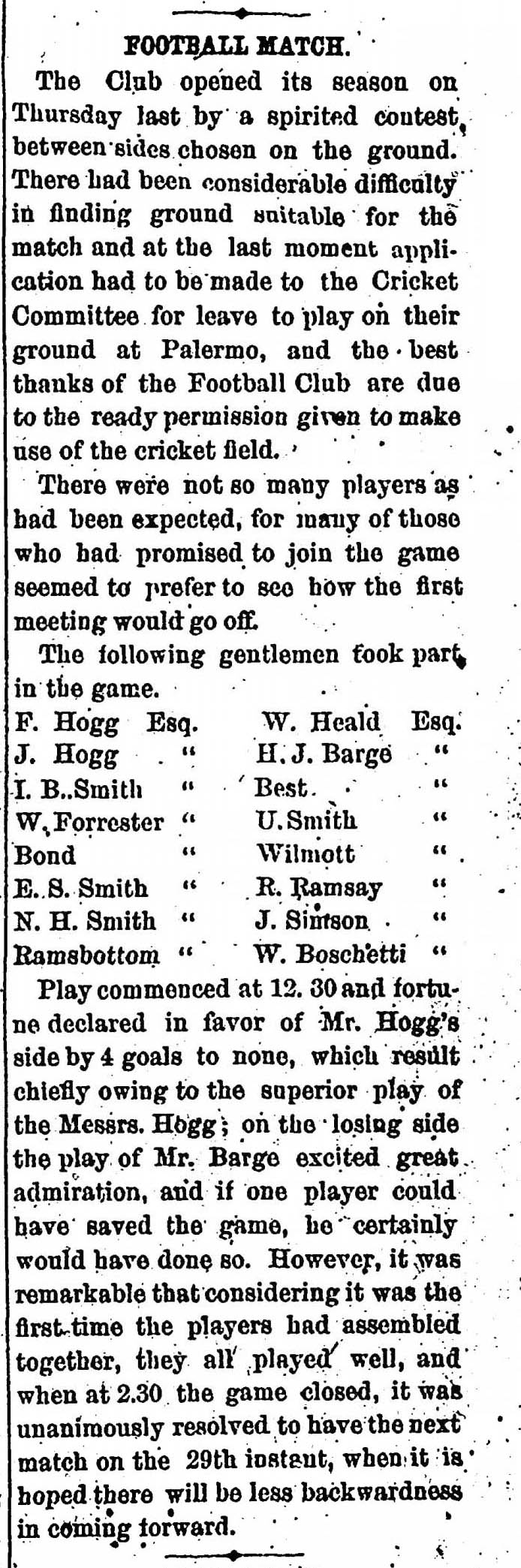
The first association football match played in Argentina, as covered by The Standard, June 1867

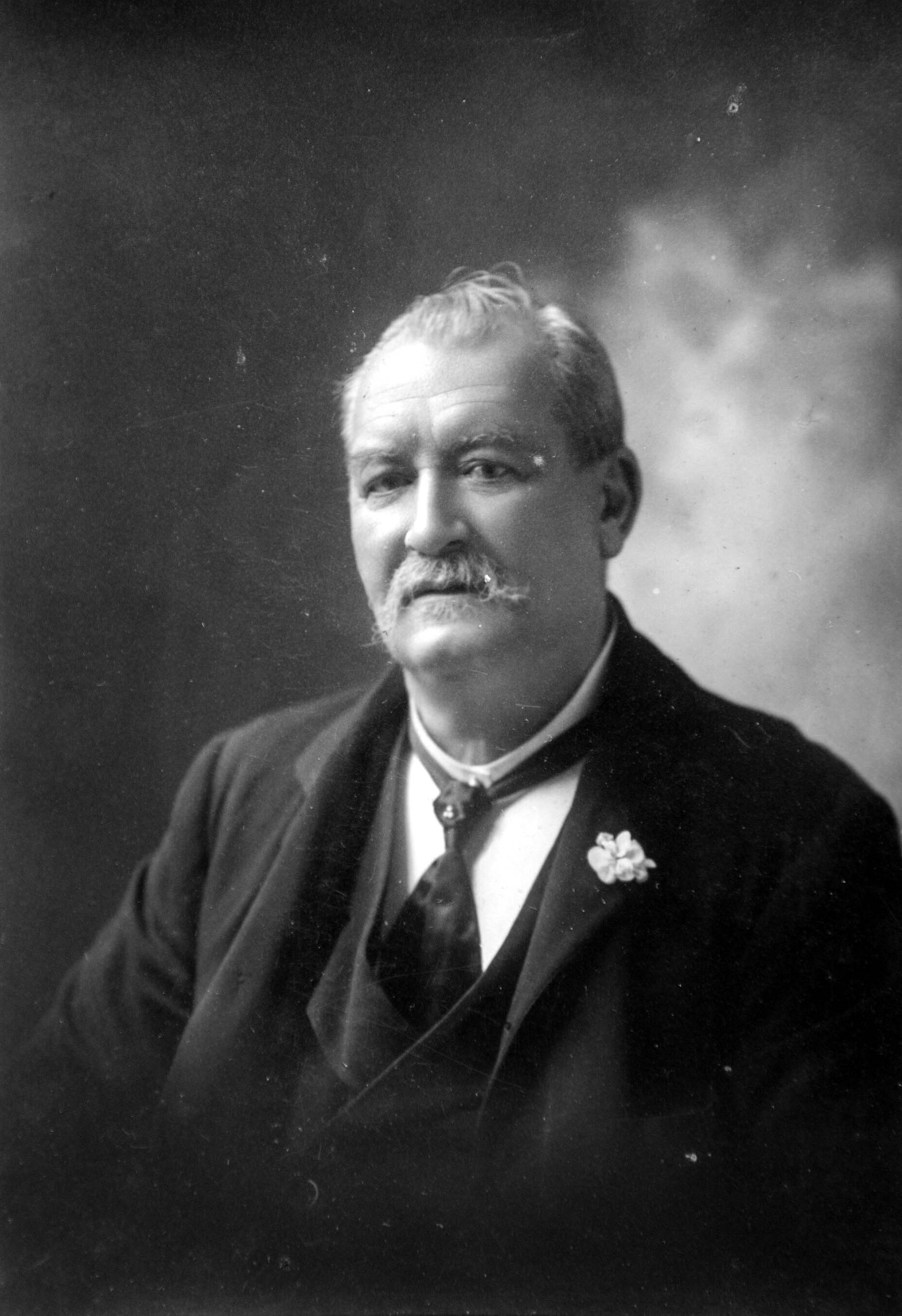
Thomas Hogg, one of BAFC founders

By 1867 there was a wide British community living in Buenos Aires. Most of them had established there coming from the United Kingdom as managers and workers of the British-owned railway lines that operated in Argentina. British citizens founded social and sports clubs where they could practise their sports, such as bowls, cricket, football, golf, horse riding, rugby union and tennis amongst others.

The "Buenos Aires Football Club" was founded on Thursday 9 May 1867 in Temple street, known today as Viamonte, in the city of Buenos Aires. The founding members were railway workers who all came from northern England, specially brothers Thomas and James Hogg.

The founding committee was formed by: Thomas Hogg, 24 years old, born in Skelton, York, Yorkshire; his brother James Hogg, 26 years old, born in Skelton, York, Yorkshire; Thomas Jackson, 29 years old, born in Cumberland; Thomas Barlow Smith, 21 years old, born in Stoney Middleton, Derbyshire; and Walter Heald, secretary, 29 years old, born in Pendle, Lancashire.

Likewise, the rules of the club were as follows:

1. The club be called "The Buenos Aires Football Club".
2. The committee of four be elected to manage the affairs of the Club.
3. The subscription for the present season be $ 30 currency.
4. The rules of The Football Association be adopted with some slight modifications.

The first match had to take place on 25 May 1867 and was advertised in the English language daily newspaper The Standard, published in Argentina:

Today there will be a football match at Palermo; we believe it will be the first kick ever given in Buenos Ayres, and we understand that half town will be there if the weather proves favourable. The kick at the Boca never came off owing to the floods in the Potreros [sic].

— The Standard, 25 May 1867

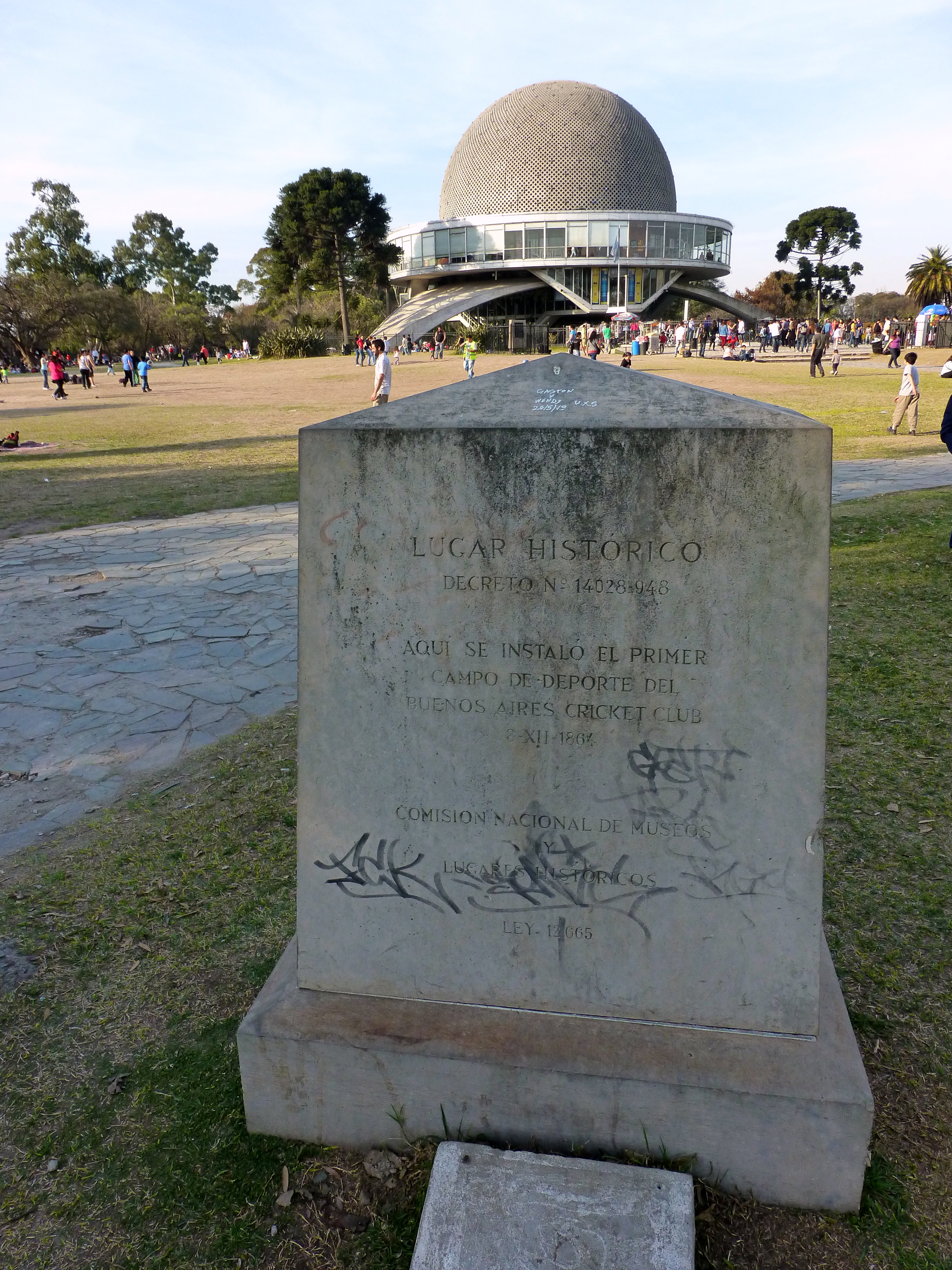
A Commemorative plaque remembers nowadays the 1st. football match played by the BAFC in Palermo

Due to poor weather conditions, the game was cancelled, being postponed for June 20, when finally the first match in Argentine football history was contested. The venue was the Buenos Aires Cricket Club Ground. Both teams were formed by members of the BACC. Thomas Hogg and Walter Heald were the captains of the teams, named "Rojos" (reds) and "Blancos" (Whites) respectively. Teams names referred to the color of the hats that both teams use to distinguish each other. Rojoes defeated Blancos by 4–0. On August 9, the Buenos Aires Football Club was officially established.

Seven months after the birth of BAFC, Thomas Hogg wrote a letter to The Standard newspaper, in which he stated:

In my opinion, this game will take a long time to spread even among British residents, but I intend to persist, because I consider it the best, easiest and cheapest pastime for middle-class youth, as well as for the common people. My great love is cricket, but I am neglecting it in favour of football.

It is recorded that in 1868 two matches were also played. In one of them, the Rojos defeated Whites by 2–1.

In 1870 the club was dissolved due to the yellow fever epidemic that killed about 8% of the inhabitants of Buenos Aires. On April 25, 1873, the club was re-established under the same name and presided by Thomas Hogg as he had done with its predecessor. On June that year the BAFC played its first match since its second foundation. The game was held in the Buenos Aires Cricket Club Ground where "Banks" and "Town" played with a mix of football association and rugby union rules.

Despite following the football association rules (although slight modifications had been introduced), most of the members preferred to follow the rugby union rules, using the hands instead of their feet. That was because those members came from different cities of England, where football in each was played in a different way, often using the hands instead feet, or both. Therefore the members of BAFC played the game as they did in the towns of their birth, being a mix of football and rugby with no defined rules. As a consequence, on 13 May 1874 the club called its members to discuss the point "4" of its rules.

Some difficulties occurred in enforcing the Rules, which differed from any existing code, and we should recommend the adoption of one of the two recognised sets of Laws now used in England in preference to continuing our own of last year.

— Buenos Aires Football Club, 13 May 1874

On Thursday, 14 May 1874, the members met to discuss which rules they should follow. After the debate they finally decided to adopt the laws of rugby union. That same day the first game under the rugby rules was played at David Mathven's country house, in Caballito, Buenos Aires. The teams were called "Equipo de Mr. Trench" and "Equipo de Mr. Hogg". This is considered the first rugby union match ever played in Argentina.

Although some historians say the club was dissolved in 1875, the club continued its activities during that year, even adopting the football association rules again, because of the serious injuries caused during the matches previously contested (that had been played under the rugby union code). In 1876 the football association rules were kept but carrying the ball with hands was allowed. On May 7, 1876, the club returned to rugby union code.

The last reported matches of the BAFC were in 1881, when the team played friendly rugby matches against Zingari Cricket Club and Montevideo Cricket Club.

== Notes ==
Due to there were at least two more clubs named "Buenos Aires Football Club", the origins of those institutions must be cleared to avoid confusions:

- Buenos Aires Football Club (1886): Formed by a group of students from the Buenos Aires English High School of Belgrano, Buenos Aires as a rugby union club. This club was a founding member of "The River Plate Rugby Football Union" (current Unión Argentina de Rugby having won 8 Torneo de la URBA championships.
- In 1891, a third "Buenos Aires Football Club" took part of the first football championship held in Argentina, being its only participation in an official competition. It is believed that the team was formed exclusively to play the tournament, with no further records about its activities in subsequent years. The team's jersey was red and white in vertical stripes.
