= Buenos Aires Cricket Club Ground =

Cricket field in Buenos Aires, Argentina

Coordinates: 34.5703°S 58.4120°W

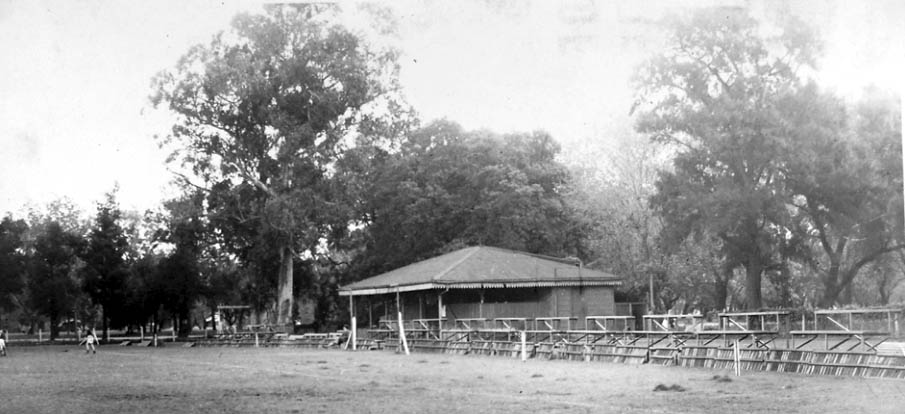
- Interactive map of Buenos Aires Cricket Club Ground
- Location: Palermo, Buenos Aires, Argentina
- Owner: Buenos Aires Cricket Club
- Surface: Grass

Construction
- Opened: 1864
- Closed: 1948; 78 years ago

Tenants
- Buenos Aires Cricket Club; Buenos Aires FC

The Buenos Aires Cricket Club Ground was a cricket field in Buenos Aires, Argentina. The ground, located in the Palermo district and property of Buenos Aires Cricket Club, gained historic relevance because the first football (in 1867) and rugby union (in 1873) matches in Argentina were played there.

== History ==
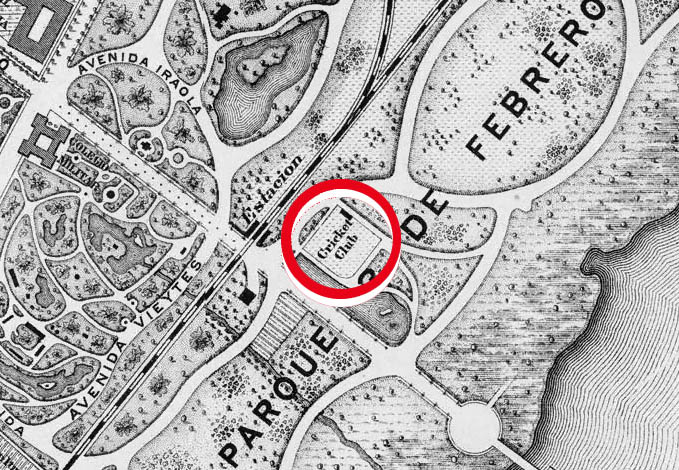
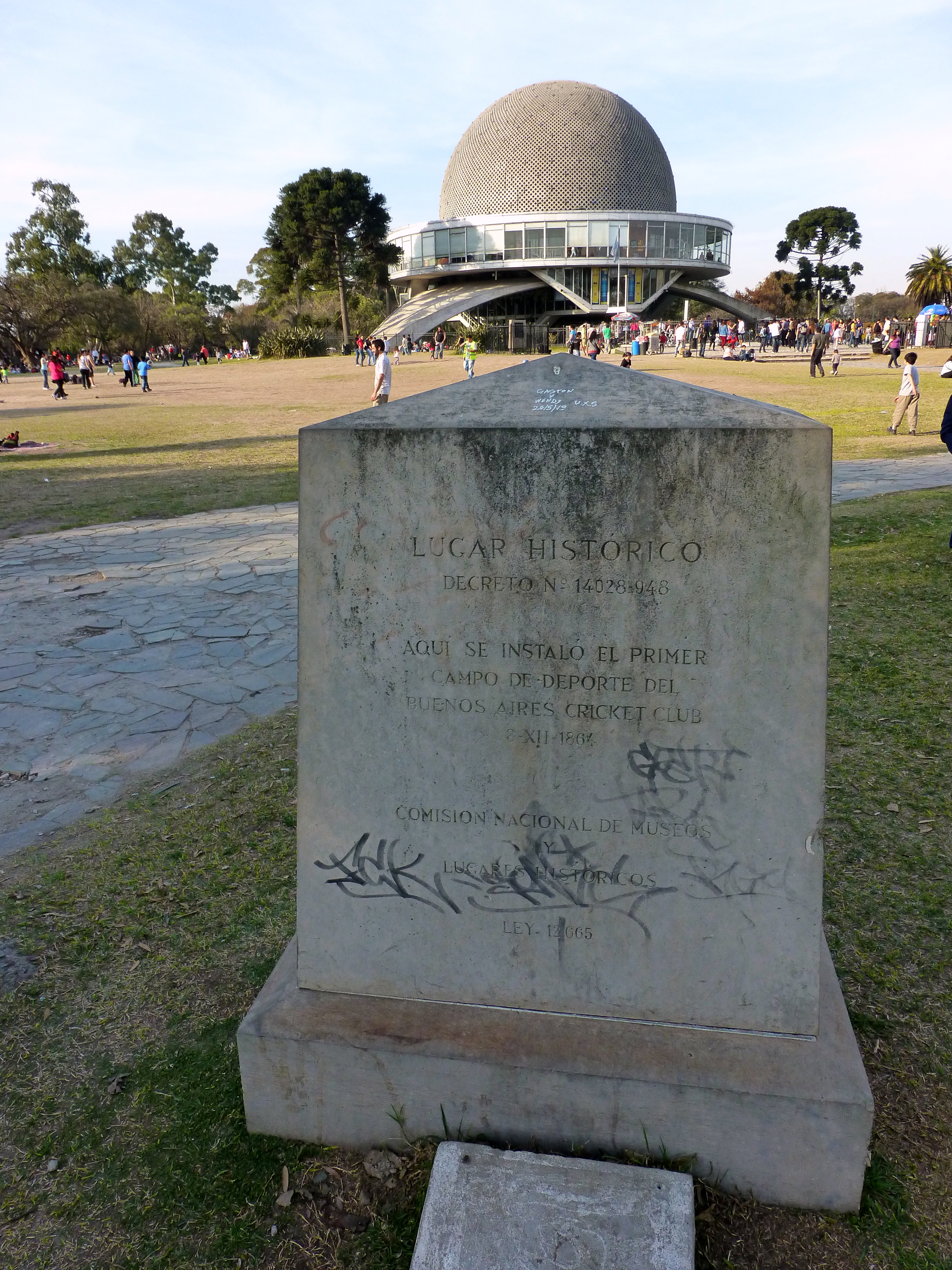
location of the ground in Palermo, from a 1895 map (left); commemorative plaque stating that the first association football and rugby union matches in Argentina were played there

The football match disputed in the BACC was such a success that some members would go on to found the Buenos Aires Football Club, which would be the first football club in South America. For years to come both clubs would share installations and members with BACC playing cricket in summer and BAFC playing football in winter.

The first recorded cricket match on the ground came in 1891 when the North of Argentina played the South of Argentina.

The ground later held its first first-class match in 1912 when Argentina national team played the touring Marylebone Cricket Club, resulting in a 210 run victory for the tourists. The second first-class match held on the ground came in 1927 in a repeat of the 1912 fixture, which this time resulted in an Argentine victory by 29 runs. The last recorded match came in March 1947 between the Argentine Cricket Association Colts North and Argentine Cricket Association Colts South. In 1951, after much of the club had been destroyed in a fire which also destroyed its archives three years before, Buenos Aires Cricket Club merged with Buenos Aires Football Club to form the Buenos Aires Cricket & Rugby Club and the club built its new cricket field in the San Fernando district of Greater Buenos Aires.
