= Mario Herrera =

American boxer

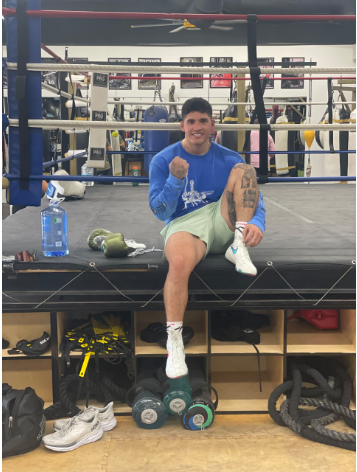
- Herrera in 2022

Personal information
- Nickname: Hemi
- Born: Mario Orlando Herrera; September 23, 1997 (age 28) Chicago, Illinois U.S.
- Height: 5 ft 10 in (178 cm)
- Weight: Middleweight; Super middleweight; Light heavyweight
- Website: teamherrerachicago.org

Boxing career
- Reach: 73 in (186 cm)
- Stance: Orthodox

Boxing record
- Total fights: 9
- Wins: 9
- Win by KO: 7
- Draws: 1

Mario Herrera (American Spanish: [ˈmɑːɹioʊ eˈreɾa]; born September 23, 1997) is an American professional boxer. As an amateur he won the Chicago Golden Gloves Tournament in 2019 in the middleweight division.

== Early life and amateur career ==
Herrera was born in Chicago, Illinois, into a Mexican American family. In 2008, Herrera moved with his family to Skokie, IL, where he attended Niles West High School.

At Niles West, he played wide receiver and linebacker for the school football team and also engaged in basketball and track and field. After high school, Herrera attended Robert Morris University where he played for the university football team.

Joining the 187 Boxing Club kickstarted Herrera’s amateur boxing career. His first bout of success came quickly, after eight amateur fights. In 2019, he competed in the Chicago Golden Gloves tournament against Oakley’s Alexandru Curmei and emerged champion after a perfect 4-0 record in the 165 lb middleweight division final.

== Professional career ==
Herrera advanced to professional boxing in 2021. He debuted on April 7, 2021, with a win over John Blanco by unanimous decision in San Antonio de Palmito, Columbia.

Soon after his opening fight, Herrera achieved TKO victories over Edwin Ortega and Francisco Morelos in Santa Cruz in July 2021. Towards the end of 2021, he achieved a KO win over Aderlin Palencia and a unanimous decision win over Edwin Polo in August, 2021, tallying up to 4 fight wins in 42 days.

On April 23, 2022 Herrera debuted in the U.S. against Jay Ellis at Abu-Bekr Temple in Sioux City, Iowa where he won by KO over Ellis to move up to a 6-0 pro career record.

After defeating Thomas Haney at McBride Hall in Gary, Indiana in May 2022, he went back to Colombia to gain two TKO wins over Luis Diaz and Davier Guardo at Coliseo Menor de Villa Olímpica, Santa Marta.

Herrera has a current record of 9-0-1 with 7 knockouts to his credit.

== Professional boxing record ==
Light middleweight

10 fights	9 wins	0 losses
By knockout	7	0
By decision	2	0
Draws	1	

No.	Result	Record	Opponent	Type	Date	Location
10	Draw	9-0-1	Courtney Williams	D-MD	October 29, 2022	Tripoli Shrine Center, Milwaukee
9	Win	9-0	Davier Guardo	TKO	June 12, 2022	Coliseo Menor de Villa Olímpica, Santa Marta, Colombia
8	Win	8-0	Luis Diaz	TKO	June 8, 2022	Coliseo Menor de Villa Olímpica, Santa Marta, Colombia
7	Win	7-0	Thomas Haney	KO	May 7, 2022	McBride Hall, Gary, IN
6	Win	6-0	Jay Ellis	KO	April 23, 2022	Abu-Bekr Temple, Sioux City, Iowa, U.S.
5	Win	5-0	Edwin Polo	UD	August 25, 2021	Hostal Camping Yolimar, Santiago de Tolu, Colombia
4	Win	4-0	Aderlin Palencia	KO	August 20, 2021	Coliseo Luis Patron Rosano, Santiago de Tolu, Colombia
3	Win	3-0	Edwin Ortega Santa Cruz	TKO	July 22, 2021	Coliseo Luis Patron Rosano, Santiago de Tolu, Colombia
2	Win	2-0	Francisco Morelos	TKO	July 13, 2021	Hotel Elsa, Santiago de Tolu, Colombia
1	Win	Debut	John Blanco	UD	April 17, 2021	San Antonio de Palmito, Colombia
