= Isabelino Gradín =

Uruguayan footballer (1897-1944)

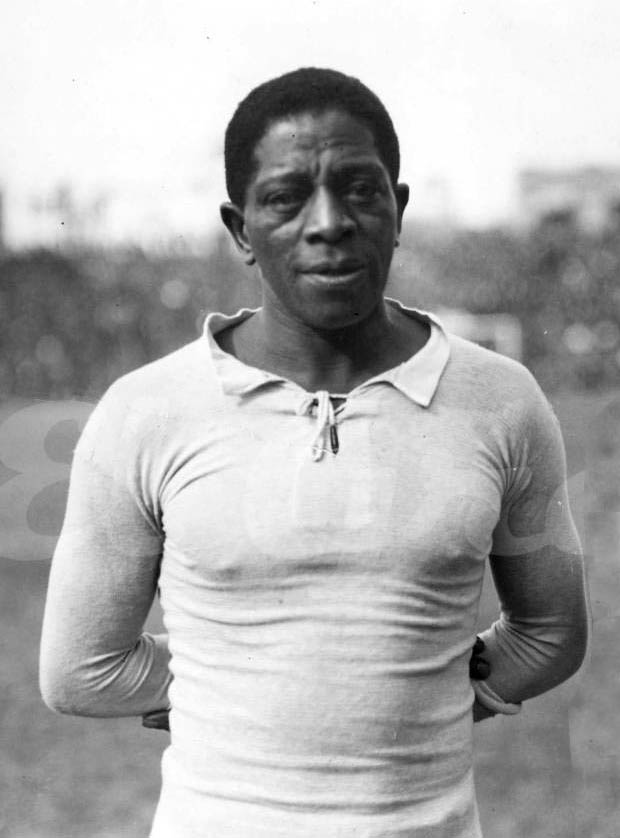

Personal information
- Date of birth: 8 July 1897
- Place of birth: Montevideo, Uruguay
- Date of death: 21 December 1944 (aged 47)
- Place of death: Montevideo, Uruguay
- Position: Forward

Senior career*
Years	Team	Apps	(Gls)
1915–1921	Peñarol	212	(101)
1922–1929	Olimpia		

International career
1915–1927	Uruguay	23	(10)
Medal record
Men's football
Representing Uruguay
South American Championship
Winner	1916 Argentina
Winner	1917 Uruguay
Runner-up	1919 Brazil
- * Club domestic league appearances and goals

Isabelino Gradín (8 July 1897 – 21 December 1944) was a Uruguayan footballer and athlete. He was considered to be one of the greatest footballers in the early era of Uruguayan football and is regarded as one of the greatest Uruguayan players before the Uruguayan win at the 1930 FIFA World Cup.

Gradín played in the first South American Championship held in Argentina, where Uruguay became the first champions of the tournament, and finished as top scorer. On 2 July of that tournament against Chile, where Uruguay would go on to win 4–0, Gradin and teammate Juan Delgado became the first black players in history to be fielded in an international tournament. Gradin was also part of the Uruguayan winning team of the 1917 South American Championship. He was also a four-time South American athletics champion in the 400 and 200 metres sprint.

== Early life ==
Gradín was born in Montevideo in 1897 and was a great-grandson of African slaves from the kingdom of Lesotho. He was brought up in the Palermo barrio in Montevideo.

== Club career ==
Gradín arrived at Peñarol in 1915 where he immediately made an impression, gaining selection for the national team in his first year. Over the course of his career he played in Uruguayan League championship in 1918 and in 1921. He played 212 games for Aurinegros, scoring 101 goals. After a dispute with the club he walked away from Peñarol in 1921.

In 1922 he was involved in the founding of the new Olimpia FC (later known as River Plate). Gradín played at Olimpia until his retirement from football in 1929 though his focus in his later career was on athletics rather than football.

== International career ==
At the age of 18 Gradín made his international debut in July 1915 against Argentina in Montevideo.

=== 1916 South American Championship ===
The 1916 South American Championship, in which Uruguay took out their first continental championship, is considered to have been Gradín's career high point. As the age of 19 he finished the tournament with three goals and was leading goalscorer for the tournament.

Gradín's racial background became an issue with Chile complaining before and after their match with Uruguay that the Uruguayans were unfairly selecting "Africans". They were unhappy with the selection of Gradín and his teammate Juan Delgado. The complaints were particularly bitter after Gradín scored two goals in Uruguay's 4–0 defeat of the Chileans. Gradín scored his third goal of the tournament in Uruguay's defeat of Brazil which won Uruguay the championship.

=== 1917 South American Championship ===
Although a member of the title-winning Uruguay squad for the 1917 South American Championship he did not make it onto the pitch for any of their matches.

=== 1919 South American Championship ===
The 1919 South American Championship had Gradín playing all of Uruguay's tournament matches and scored two goals. Brazil prevailed over Uruguay in the playoff final. It is recorded as the longest game in history: Brazil 1 – Uruguay 0 (150 minutes = 90 +15 +15 +15 +15).

Gradín playing on a foreign national team in Brazil did not quell the support he received from black Brazilians. Brazil was reluctant to select black players for their national teams.

=== 1920s ===
After the 1919 championships Gradín played sporadically for Uruguay. This was partly due to his siding with the rebel Federación Uruguaya de Football against the mainstream Uruguayan Football Association. In 1924 Gradín played for a rebel Uruguay national team organised by the FUF against an Argentina national team organised by the Asociación Amateurs de Football. This led to him missing out on selection during Uruguay's successful tournament run when they won several South American Championships and an Olympic gold medal.

By the time he played his last international in July 1927, against Argentina in Montevideo, he had played 23 times for the national teams, scoring 10 goals. He refused selection for Uruguay to the 1928 Olympic Games.

== Playing style ==
Although Gradín was a natural left-footer, he was proficient with both feet. He built a reputation on his explosive pace, accurate crossing and powerful shooting.

Gradín's playing style inspired Peruvian poet Juan Parra del Riego to compose a poem Polirritmo al jugador de fútbol in his honour.

== Career statistics ==
=== International ===
Appearances and goals by national team and year
National team	Year	Apps	Goals
Uruguay	1915	1	0
Uruguay	1916	6	6
Uruguay	1917	3	1
Uruguay	1918	6	1
Uruguay	1919	5	2
Uruguay	1920	1	0
Uruguay	1921	0	0
Uruguay	1922	0	0
Uruguay	1923	0	0
Uruguay	1924	0	0
Uruguay	1925	0	0
Uruguay	1926	0	0
Uruguay	1927	1	0
Total		23	10

== Track and field ==
While still playing football, Gradín also managed to be a successful athlete.

=== Club ===
Gradín began his club athletics career with Plaza de Deportes Nº 1 before transferring to Club Atlético Olimpio in 1918.

=== International competition ===
In 1918 he won two medals at the Campeonato de Iniciación, a gold medal in the 400 metres and a bronze medal in the 200 metres.

At the 1919 South American Championships in Athletics he won gold medals for the 200-metre and 400-metre sprints.

He followed up his 1919 success at the 1920 South American Championships in Athletics by defending his 200 and 400 metres titles.

In 1922 at the unofficial South American Championships known as the Campeonato Latino-Americano, Gradín won a gold medal in the 400 metres sprint.

== Later life and death ==
Gradín spent his final years destitute and in poverty. By 1944 Gradín had become seriously ill and was in hospital. On 17 December 1944, the day they had won the Uruguayan championship, the entire Peñarol team visited him at the Pasteur Hospital, dedicating their win to him. He died four days later on 21 December 1944.

A biography of his life was released in 2000 by Uruguayan author Carina Blixen entitled Isabelino Gradín : testimonio de una vida.

A square in Montevideo is named in his memory. In 2009 a memorial star was placed in the square by the Montevideo local government.
