= Arturo Medina =

Chilean javelin thrower

Personal information
- Nationality: Chilean
- Born: 30 June 1898
- Died: 29 October 1986 (aged 88)

Sport
- Sport: Athletics
- Event: Javelin throw

Arturo Medina (30 June 1898 – 29 October 1986) was a Chilean athlete. He competed in the men's javelin throw at the 1920 Summer Olympics.
