= New Zealand Rowing Championships =

The New Zealand Rowing Championships is the club championship regatta for New Zealand.

== History ==
The regatta is held alternatively between Lake Karapiro and Lake Ruataniwha in February over five days each year.

The New Zealand Rowing Championships were first held in 1888 where a four race was held in Wanganui and a single sculls race was held in Wellington.

The championships have been held every year since with the exception of two intervals during the World Wars.

Clubs race for the Centennial Oar, Centennial Scull and the top rowing association in eight boat events wins the Hallyburton Johnstone Rose Bowl.

== Results – men ==
Results as they are known are shown in the table below.

		Current events						Lightweight events			Discontinued	
Year	Venue	1X	2-	2X	4X	4-	8+	lw1X	lw2X	lw2-	2+	4+
1888	Wanganui	J. Foster										Canterbury RC
1889	Wanganui	T. McKay	Wellington RC	Wellington RC								Wellington RC
1890	Wanganui	T. Sullivan	Wellington RC	Wellington RC								Wellington RC
1891	Wanganui	W. Bridson	Wellington RC	Star BC								Wellington RC
1892	Nelson	M. Keefe	Star BC	Wellington RC								Canterbury RC
1893	Christchurch	J. F. McGrath	Union RC (Chch)	Union RC (Chch)								Lyttelton RC
1894	Picton	M. Keefe	Union RC (Chch)	Union RC (Chch)								Lyttelton RC
1895	Picton	J. F. McGrath	Union RC (Chch)	Union RC (Chch)								Queens Drive RC
1896	Picton	C. Chapman	Canterbury RC	Waiwera RC								Queens Drive RC
1897	Picton	C. Chapman	Picton RC	Waiwera RC								Queens Drive RC
1898	Dunedin	J. F. McGrath	Wellington RC	Otago RC								Picton RC
1899	Auckland	P. Graham	Wellington RC	Star BC								Picton RC
1900	Picton	T. Spencer	Wellington RC	Canterbury RC								Picton RC
1901	Christchurch	J. F. McGrath	Wellington RC	Otago RC								Canterbury RC
1902	Wellington	J. F. McGrath	Wellington RC	Otago RC								Kawatiri RC
1903	Wanganui	W. Webb	Wellington RC	Otago RC								Kawatiri RC
1904	Lake Waihola	J. F. McGrath	Pt Chalmers RC	Otago RC								Pt Chalmers RC
1905	Wellington	G. Whelch	Canterbury RC	Union BC (Wang)								Star BC
1906	Picton	W. Webb	Dunedin ABC	Union BC (Wang)								Blenheim RC
1907	Christchurch	G. Whelch	Akaroa BC	Akaroa BC								Union BC (Wang)
1908	Napier	G. Whelch	Picton BC	Akaroa BC								Blenheim RC
1909	Auckland	C. E. Stone	Union RC (Chch)	Union RC (Chch)								Waitemata BC
1910	Picton	C. E. Stone	Picton RC	Wanganui RC								Union BC (Wang)
1911	Wanganui	C. E. Stone	Union RC (Chch)	Union BC (Wang)								Blenheim RC
1912	Dunedin	C. E. Stone	Picton RC	Union BC (Wang)								Picton RC
1913	Wellington	D. C. Hadfield	Union BC (Wang)	Akaroa BC								Union BC (Wang)
1914	Mercer	D. C. Hadfield	Union BC (Wang)	Union BC (Wang)								Union BC (Wang)
1915	Picton	D. C. Hadfield	Picton RC	Union BC (Wang)								Union BC (Wang)
1916	Not held due to WWI											
1917	Not held due to WWI											
1918	Not held due to WWI											
1919	Not held due to WWI											
1920	Wanganui	D. C. Hadfield	Union BC (Wang)	Waitemata BC								Union BC (Wang)
1921	Picton	I. W. St Clair	Union RC (Chch)	Union BC (Wang)								Union BC (Wang)
1922	Wanganui	A. Sharpe	Union BC (Wang)	Union BC (Wang)								Union BC (Wang)
1923	Bluff	W. A. Stevenson	Avon RC	Hamilton RC								Union BC (Wang)
1924	Picton	W. A. Stevenson	Union RC (Chch)	Hamilton RC								Blenheim RC
1925	Hamilton	I. W. St Clair	Wairau RC	Waitemata BC								Hamilton RC
1926	Dunedin	W. A. Stevenson	Hamilton RC	Waitemata BC								Otago RC
1927	Picton	W. A. Stevenson	Wairau RC	Hamilton RC								Otago RC
1928	Wanganui	A. K. G. Jackson	Avon RC	Union BC (Wang)								Union BC (Wang)
1929	Picton	W. Turner	Star BC	Union BC (Wang)								Hamilton RC
1930	Picton	W. Turner	Hamilton RC	Union BC (Wang)								Picton RC
1931	Wellington	W. Turner	Avon RC	Tauranga RC								Hamilton RC
1932	Hamilton	R. B. Smith	Avon RC	Union BC (Wang)								Hamilton RC
1933	Wanganui	A. K. G. Jackson	Star BC	Union BC (Wang)								Auckland RC
1934	Picton	W. Turner	Avon RC	Waitemata BC								Wairau RC
1935	Auckland	A. K. G. Jackson	Star BC	Petone RC								Aramoho BC
1936	Wellington	R. B. Smith	Hamilton RC	Petone RC								Picton RC
1937	Akaroa	R. B. Smith	Avon RC	Auckland RC			Union BC (Wang)					Petone RC
1938	Wanganui	R. B. Smith	Wanganui RC	Auckland RC			Union BC (Wang)					Clifton RC
1939	Picton	R. B. Smith	Union RC (Chch)	Petone RC			Union BC (Wang)					Clifton RC
1940	Wellington	R. B. Smith	Union RC (Chch)	Petone RC			Aramoho BC					Clifton RC
1941	Not held due to WWII											
1942	Not held due to WWII											
1943	Not held due to WWII											
1944	Not held due to WWII											
1945	Not held due to WWII											
1946	Wanganui	P. A. Abbott	Avon RC	Petone RC			Auckland RC					Pt Chalmers RC
1947	Picton	P. A. Abbott	Avon RC	Petone RC			Aramoho BC					Petone RC
1948	Port Chalmers	J. Schneider	Avon RC	Union BC (Wang)			Aramoho BC					Petone RC
1949	Lake Karapiro	T. F. Hegglun	Blenheim RC	Aramoho BC			West End RC					Aramoho BC
1950	Wanganui	J. Schneider	Avon RC	Aramoho BC			Aramoho BC					Napier RC
1951	Akaroa	R. A. Douglas	Blenheim RC	Aramoho BC			West End RC					Napier RC
1952	Wellington	J. K. Stevenson	Petone RC	Auckland RC			West End RC					Aramoho BC
1953	Queenstown	D. D. Rowlands	Petone RC	Auckland RC			West End RC					West End RC
1954	Picton	D. D. Rowlands	Mercer RC	Mercer RC			West End RC					Wairau RC
1955	Wairoa	D. D. Rowlands	West End RC	Whakatane RC			West End RC					Aramoho BC
1956	Invercargill	D. D. Rowlands	West End RC	West End RC			West End RC					Mercer RC
1957	Lake Karapiro	D. D. Rowlands	Mercer RC	St Georges RC			West End RC					Clifton RC
1958	Wanganui	J. R. Hill	Mercer RC	Hamilton RC			West End RC					Union BC (Wang)
1959	Lake Waihola	J. R. Hill	Mercer RC	Hamilton RC			Union BC (Wang)					Otago RC
1960	Picton	J. R. Hill	Mercer RC	Hamilton RC			Union BC (Wang)					North End RC
1961	Wellington	J. R. Hill	Otago RC	Auckland RC			Union BC (Wang)					Oamaru RC
1962	Christchurch	J. R. Hill	Otago RC	West End RC			Union BC (Wang)					Oamaru RC
1963	Lake Karapiro	J. R. Hill	Whakatane RC	Whakatane RC			West End RC					Auckland RC
1964	Lake Waihola	M. Watkinson	Whakatane RC	Whakatane RC			Waikato RC					Auckland RC
1965	Wanganui	M. Watkinson	Union RC (Chch)	Whakatane RC			West End RC					Auckland RC
1966	Lake Karapiro	M. Watkinson	Riverton RC	West End RC			Auckland RC				Whakatane RC	Auckland RC
1967	Lake Waihola	D. T. Molesworth	Wakatipu RC	Whakatane RC			Wellington RC				Whakatane RC	Hutt Valley RC
1968	Lake Karapiro	M. Watkinson	Whakatane RC	West End RC			Auckland RC				Whakatane RC	Hutt Valley RC
1969	Wanganui	M. Watkinson	Whakatane RC	West End RC			Wellington RC				Whakatane RC	Hutt Valley RC
1970	Lake Waihola	M. Watkinson	Whakatane RC	West End RC			Whakatane RC				Hutt Valley RC	Whakatane RC
1971	Lake Karapiro	M. Watkinson	Whakatane RC	West End RC			Whakatane RC				Hamilton RC	Whakatane RC
1972	Wanganui	M. Watkinson	Whakatane RC	West End RC			West End RC				Whakatane RC	Wellington RC
1973	Lake Waihola	W. J. White	Whakatane RC	West End RC			Waikato RC				Avon RC	Whakatane RC
1974	Lake Karapiro	W. J. White	Whakatane RC	West End RC			Whakatane RC				Cambridge RC	Avon RC
1975	Lake Waihola	J. M. Alexander	Whakatane RC	West End RC			Whakatane RC				Whakatane RC	Avon RC
1976	Lake Karapiro	G. W. Veldman	Petone RC	West End RC	West End RC	Petone RC	Avon RC	J. Walker			Petone RC	Avon RC
1977	Lake Horowhenua	G. R. F. McAuley	Waikato RC	West End RC	West End RC	Whakatane RC	Petone RC	D. Culpan			West End RC	Avon RC
1978	Lake Karapiro	J. M. Alexander	Waikato RC	West End RC	West End RC	Avon RC	Waikato RC	J. Walker			Petone RC	Waikato RC
1979	Lake Waihola	J. M. Alexander	North Shore RC	West End RC	Whakatane RC	Avon RC	Waikato RC	J. Walker	Awarua RC		Petone RC	Waikato RC
1980	Lake Horowhenua	J. M. Alexander	Wairau RC	Auckland RC	Auckland RC	Petone RC	Avon RC	R. Michels	Waihopai RC		Wairau RC	Waikato RC
1981	Lake Karapiro	J. M. Alexander	Waikato RC	Auckland RC	West End RC	Avon RC	Waikato RC	S. Ryan	Cambridge RC		Waikato RC	Petone RC
1982	Lake Waihola	C. C. Robertson	North Shore RC	Whakatane RC	West End RC	Wairau RC	Waikato RC	A. G. Rowe	Waihopai RC		Waikato RC	North Shore RC
1983	Lake Horowhenua	G. F. Reid	Wairau RC	Whakatane RC	West End RC	Waikato RC	Waikato RC	S. Ryan	Waihopai RC		Waikato RC	North Shore RC
1984	Lake Karapiro	G. F. Reid	Avon RC	West End RC	Auckland RC	Waikato RC	Waikato RC	A. G. Rowe	Awarua RC		Waikato RC	Waikato RC
1985	Lake Ruataniwha	G. A Keys	Waikato RC	West End RC	Auckland RC	Waikato RC	Waikato RC	G. Manson	North End RC		Waikato RC	Waikato RC
1986	Lake Karapiro	G. F. Reid	North Shore RC	Whakatane RC	Nelson RC	Avon RC	Waikato RC	D. Maher	Auckland RC	Waikato RC	Waikato RC	Waikato RC
1987	Lake Ruataniwha	E. F. M. Verdonk	Waikato RC	North Shore RC	Wairau RC	Waikato RC	Waikato RC	G. Manson	North End RC	Waikato RC	Waikato RC	Waikato RC
1988	Lake Karapiro	E. F. M. Verdonk	Waikato RC	North Shore RC	Wairau RC / Bay Scullers	Waikato RC	Waikato RC	D. P. Healy	Waikato RC	Waikato RC	Waikato RC	Waikato RC
1989	Lake Ruataniwha	E. F. M. Verdonk	Waikato RC	North Shore RC	Auckland RC	Waikato RC	Waikato RC	D. P. Healy	Waikato RC	Waikato RC	Waikato RC	Waikato RC
1990	Lake Karapiro	E. F. M. Verdonk	Waikato RC	North Shore RC	Waikato RC	Waikato RC	Waikato RC	D. P. Healy	Auckland RC	Waikato RC	Waikato RC	Waikato RC
1991	Lake Ruataniwha	E. F. M. Verdonk	Waikato RC	Whakatane RC	North Shore RC	Waikato RC	Waikato RC	D. P. Healy	Waikato RC	Waikato RC	Waikato RC	Waikato RC
1992	Lake Karapiro	E. F. M. Verdonk	Waikato RC	North Shore RC	Waikato RC	Waikato RC	Waikato RC	R. Hamill	Waikato RC	Waikato RC	Waikato RC	Waikato RC
1993	Lake Ruataniwha	E. F. M. Verdonk	Waikato RC	Auckland RC	Waikato RC	Waikato RC	Waikato RC	M. Conway	Invercargill RC	Invercargill RC	Waikato RC	Waikato RC
1994	Lake Karapiro	R. Newey	Waikato RC	North Shore RC	Waikato RC	Waikato RC	Waikato RC	M. Conway	Eastern Bay SC	Waihopai RC		Waikato RC
1995	Lake Ruataniwha	R. N. Waddell	Waikato RC	North Shore RC	Waikato RC	Waikato RC	Waikato RC	C. Haughey	Canterbury RC	Canterbury RC		Waikato RC
1996	Lake Karapiro	R. N. Waddell	Avon RC	Waikato RC	Waikato RC	Waikato RC	Waikato RC	D. P. Healy	Cambridge RC	Aramoho RC		Waikato RC
1997	Lake Ruataniwha	R. N. Waddell	Avon RC	Waikato RC	Waikato RC	Avon RC	Avon RC	S. Bowers	Aramoho RC	Aramoho RC		Avon RC
1998	Lake Karapiro	R. N. Waddell	Horowhenua RC	Waikato RC	Waikato RC	Avon RC	Waikato RC	M. W. Gilbert	Avon RC	Aramoho RC		Waikato RC
1999	Lake Ruataniwha	R. N. Waddell	Avon RC	Waikato RC	Waikato RC	Avon RC	Avon RC	C. P. Ferguson	Awarua RC	Invercargill RC		
2000	Lake Karapiro	R. N. Waddell	Auckland RC	Waikato RC	Waikato RC	Waikato RC	Avon RC	C. P. Ferguson	Union BC	Otago University		
2001	Lake Ruataniwha	S.G. Westlake	Waikato RC	Waikato RC	Waikato RC	Avon RC	Avon RC	D. Grant	Aramoho RC	Nelson RC		
2002	Lake Karapiro	N. Twaddle	Wairau RC	Waikato RC	Waikato RC	Avon RC	Avon RC	D. Grant	Aramoho RC			Avon RC
2003	Lake Ruataniwha	A. M. O. Drysdale	Wairau RC	Waikato RC	Auckland RC	Avon RC	Avon RC	D. Grant	Aramoho RC			Avon RC
2004	Lake Karapiro	N. Twaddle	Canaviron RC	Waikato RC	Canterbury RC	Auckland RC	Canterbury RC	S. Uru	Aramoho RC			Canaviron RC
2005	Lake Ruataniwha	A. M. O. Drysdale	Canaviron RC	Waikato RC	Canaviron RC	Canaviron RC	Canaviron RC	S. Uru	Aramoho RC			Canaviron RC
2006	Lake Karapiro	A. M. O. Drysdale	Central RPC	Auckland RPC	Auckland RPC	Auckland RC	Auckland RPC	D. Grant	Central RPC	Waikato RC		Canaviron RC
2007	Lake Ruataniwha	A. M. O. Drysdale	Auckland RPC	Southern RPC	Auckland RPC	Southern RPC	Waikato RPC	D. Grant	Southern RPC	Central RPC		Waikato RC
2008	Lake Karapiro	R. N. Waddell	Southern RPC	Southern RPC	Southern RPC	Southern RPC	Waikato RPC	P. Taylor	Southern RPC	Southern RPC		Waikato RC
2009	Lake Ruataniwha	A. M. O. Drysdale	Southern RPC	Southern RPC	Southern RPC	Southern RPC	Southern RPC	D. Grant	Southern RPC	Southern RPC		Waikato RC
2010	Lake Karapiro	A. M. O. Drysdale	Southern RPC	Southern RPC	Southern RPC	Southern RPC	Waikato RPC	S. Uru	Southern RPC	Southern RPC		Wairau RC
2011	Lake Ruataniwha	N. P. Cohen	Southern RPC	Southern RPC	Central RPC	Southern RPC	Southern RPC	P. Taylor	Waikato RPC	Southern RPC		Wairau RC
2012	Lake Karapiro	A. M. O. Drysdale	Southern RPC	Central RPC	Central RPC	Central RPC	Central RPC	P. Taylor	Waikato RPC	Waikato RPC		Waikato RC
2013	Lake Ruataniwha	N. P. Cohen	Southern RPC	Central RPC	Southern RPC	Waikato RPC	Southern RPC	J. Schömann-Finck	Central RPC	Waikato RPC		Waikato RC
2014	Lake Karapiro	H. B. Bond	Southern RPC	Central RPC	Central RPC	Central RPC	Waikato RPC	P. Taylor	Waikato RPC			Waikato RC
2015	Lake Ruataniwha	A. M. O. Drysdale	Southern RPC	Central RPC	Central RPC	Southern RPC	Waikato RPC	A. Ling	Southern RPC	Southern RPC		North Shore RC
2016	Lake Karapiro	A. M. O. Drysdale	Central RPC	Central RPC	Southern RPC	Waikato RPC	Waikato RPC	A. Ling	Southern RPC	Southern RPC		North Shore RC
2017	Lake Ruataniwha	R. Manson	Central RPC	Central RPC	Auckland RPC	Waikato RPC	Waikato RPC	M. Dunham	Central RPC	Southern RPC		Waikato RC
2018	Lake Karapiro	R. Manson	Central RPC	Central RPC	Central RPC	North Shore RC	Waikato RPC	M. Dunham	Auckland RPC			Waikato RC
2019	Lake Ruataniwha	R. Manson	Central RPC	Southern RPC	Southern RPC	North Shore RC	Auckland RPC	M. Dunham	Auckland RPC			West End RC
2020	Lake Karapiro	R. Manson	Southern RPC	Central RPC	Wairau RC	Waikato RC	Southern RPC	L. Docherty	Union BC	Waikato RC		Waikato RC
2021	Lake Ruataniwha	J. Lopas	Southern RPC	Southern RPC	Auckland RC	North Shore RC	North Shore RC					
2022	Lake Ruataniwha	B. Mason	Avon RC	Avon RC	Wairau RC	Avon RC	West End RC					
2023	Lake Ruataniwha	P. Wilson	North Shore RC	Waikato RC	Waikato RC	Avon RC	Avon RC					
2024	Lake Karapiro	T. Mackintosh	North Shore RC	Waikato RC	Waikato RC	Avon RC	North Shore RC					
2025	Lake Ruataniwha	F. Hamill	Avon RC	Waikato RC	Waikato RC	Avon RC	Avon RC					
2026	Lake Karapiro	F. Hamill	Avon RC	Waikato RC	Waikato RC	Avon RC	Avon RC					

== Results – women ==
Women first rowed in national championships in 1968, when both titles went to visiting Australian crews. Results as they are known are shown in the table below.

		Current events						Lightweight events	
Year	Venue	1X	2-	2X	4X	4-	8+	1X	2X
1968	Lake Karapiro		New South Wales			New South Wales			
1969	Wanganui					Auckland University			
1970	Lake Waihola		Wairau RC						
1971	Lake Karapiro		Wakatipu RC						
1972			Wairau RC						
1973	Lake Waihola	L. J. Keys	Awarua RC	Auckland University					
1974	Lake Karapiro	E. H. Cato	Wairau RC	Auckland University					
1975	Lake Waihola	L. J. Keys	Not Completed	Not Completed					
1976	Lake Karapiro	E. H. Cato	Wairau RC	Hamilton RC	Porirua RC		Auckland RC		
1977	Lake Horowhenua	E. H. Cato	Hamilton RC	Hamilton RC	Hamilton RC		Hamilton RC		
1978	Lake Karapiro	Stephanie Foster	Hamilton RC	Auckland RC	Hamilton RC		Hamilton RC		
1979	Lake Waihola	Stephanie Foster	Wairau RC	Auckland RC	Hamilton RC		Hamilton RC		
1980	Lake Horowhenua	Stephanie Foster	Te Awamutu RC	North Shore RC	Hamilton RC		Te Awamutu RC		
1981	Lake Karapiro	Stephanie Foster	Te Awamutu RC	Star BC	Wellington RC		Te Awamutu RC		
1982	Lake Waihola	Stephanie Foster	Te Awamutu RC	Cambridge RC	Te Awamutu RC		Canterbury RC		
1983	Lake Horowhenua	Stephanie Foster	Cambridge RC	North Shore RC	Cambridge RC		Cambridge RC		
1984	Lake Karapiro	Stephanie Foster	Canterbury RC	Cambridge RC	Cambridge RC		Canterbury RC		
1985	Lake Ruataniwha	Stephanie Foster	Canterbury RC	Cambridge RC	Wairau RC		Canterbury RC		
1986	Lake Karapiro	Stephanie Foster	Hamilton RC	Cambridge RC	Cambridge RC		Hamilton RC		
1987	Lake Ruataniwha	Phillippa Baker	Hamilton RC	Cambridge RC	Cambridge RC		Cambridge RC		
1988	Lake Karapiro	Phillippa Baker	Hamilton RC	Hamilton RC	Hamilton RC		Hamilton RC	Phillippa Baker	
1989	Lake Ruataniwha	Brenda Lawson	Hamilton RC	Hamilton RC	Hamilton RC		Hamilton RC	Phillippa Baker	
1990	Lake Karapiro	Brenda Lawson	Hamilton RC	Marlborough RC	Cambridge RC	Hamilton RC	Hamilton RC	Linda De Jong	
1991	Lake Ruataniwha	Phillippa Baker	Hamilton RC	Cambridge RC	Cambridge RC	Hamilton RC	Hamilton RC	C. Miller	
1992	Lake Karapiro	Brenda Lawson	Cambridge RC	Hamilton RC	Cambridge RC	Hamilton RC	Hamilton RC	Linda De Jong	
1993	Lake Ruataniwha	Brenda Lawson	Hamilton RC	Hamilton RC	Hamilton RC	Hamilton RC	Hamilton RC	C. Winders	
1994	Lake Karapiro	Brenda Lawson	North Shore RC	Hamilton RC	Hamilton RC	Canterbury RC	Cambridge RC	C. Winders	
1995	Lake Ruataniwha	Brenda Lawson	Union BC	Hamilton RC	Union BC (Wang)	Waihopai RC	Cambridge RC	C. Burgham	
1996	Lake Karapiro	Brenda Lawson	Cambridge RC	Union BC (Wang)	Union BC (Wang)	Cambridge RC	Union BC (Wang)	C. Forlong	
1997	Lake Ruataniwha	Sonia Scown	Star BC	Cambridge RC	North Shore RC	Star BC	Cambridge RC	J. Scoggins	
1998	Lake Karapiro	Sonia Scown	Canterbury RC	Canterbury RC	Cambridge RC	Cambridge RC	Cambridge RC	Melissa Bray	Star BC
1999	Lake Ruataniwha	Sonia Scown	Canterbury RC	Canterbury RC	Cambridge RC	Union BC (Wang)	Star BC	Alex Scott	Star BC
2000	Lake Karapiro	Sonia Waddell	Cambridge RC	Cambridge RC	Cambridge RC	Canterbury RC	Cambridge RC	Melissa Bray	Otago RC
2001	Lake Ruataniwha	Caroline Evers-Swindell	Hamilton RC	Hamilton RC	Hamilton RC	Cambridge RC	Cambridge RC	R. M. Brider	Otago RC
2002	Lake Karapiro	Caroline Evers-Swindell	Hamilton RC	Hamilton RC	Hamilton RC	Hamilton RC	Cambridge RC	C. Forlong	Otago RC
2003	Lake Ruataniwha	Caroline Evers-Swindell	Hamilton RC	Hamilton RC	Hamilton RC	Hamilton RC	Wairau RC	C. Forlong	Otago RC
2004	Lake Karapiro	Georgina Evers-Swindell	West End RC	Hamilton RC	Hamilton RC	West End RC	Wairau RC	Carolyn Steele	Otago RC
2005	Lake Ruataniwha	Caroline Evers-Swindell	Hamilton RC	Hamilton RC	Hamilton RC	Hamilton RC	Hamilton RC	Kate Ferguson	Canterbury RC
2006	Lake Karapiro	Caroline Evers-Swindell	Auckland RPC	Waikato RPC	Waikato RPC	Auckland RPC	Central RPC	Candice Hammond	Waihopai RC
2007	Lake Ruataniwha	Caroline Evers-Swindell	Auckland RPC	Waikato RPC	Waikato RPC	Auckland RPC	Auckland RPC	Candice Hammond	Central RPC
2008	Lake Karapiro	Caroline Evers-Swindell	Auckland RPC	Waikato RPC	Waikato RPC	Auckland RPC	Auckland RPC	Sarah Alexander	Central RPC
2009	Lake Ruataniwha	Emma Twigg	Central RPC	Auckland RPC	Auckland RPC	Central RPC	Central RPC	Candice Hammond	Central RPC
2010	Lake Karapiro	Emma Twigg	Auckland RPC	Central RPC	Central RPC	Waikato RPC	Central RPC	Lucy Strack	Waikato RPC
2011	Lake Ruataniwha	Emma Twigg	Central RPC	Central RPC	Waikato RPC	Southern RPC	Southern RPC	Lucy Strack	Waikato RPC
2012	Lake Karapiro	Emma Twigg	Auckland RPC	Central RPC	Southern RPC	Auckland RPC	Southern RPC	Julia Edward	Waikato RPC
2013	Lake Ruataniwha	Emma Twigg	Southern RPC	Waikato RPC	Waikato RPC	Auckland RPC	Southern RPC	Lucy Strack	Central RPC
2014	Lake Karapiro	Emma Twigg	Central RPC	Southern RPC	Waikato RPC	Central RPC	Southern RPC	Lucy Strack	Central RPC
2015	Lake Ruataniwha	Lucy Spoors	Southern RPC	Southern RPC	Waikato RPC	Auckland RPC	Southern RPC	Zoe McBride	Central RPC
2016	Lake Karapiro	Emma Twigg	Southern RPC	Waikato RPC	Waikato RPC	Central RPC	Central RPC	Zoe McBride	Swiss HPS
2017	Lake Ruataniwha	Zoe McBride	Southern RPC	Waikato RPC	Waikato RPC	Southern RPC	Southern RPC	Zoe McBride	Auckland RPC
2018	Lake Karapiro	Brooke Donoghue	Southern RPC	Waikato RPC	Not Contested	Southern RPC	Central RPC	Zoe McBride	North Shore RC
2019	Lake Ruataniwha	Emma Twigg	Central RPC	Waikato RPC	Waikato RPC	Central RPC	Central RPC	Jackie Kiddle	Not Contested
2020	Lake Karapiro	Emma Twigg	Southern RPC	Waikato RPC	Not Contested	Central RPC	Not Contested	Amy Robson	Not Contested
2021	Lake Ruataniwha	Brooke Donoghue	Southern RPC	Waikato RPC	Cambridge RC	Aramoho RC	Avon RC		
2022	Lake Ruataniwha	Shannon Cox	Waikato RC	Waikato RC	Not Contested	Waikato RC	Not Contested		
2023	Lake Ruataniwha	Emma Twigg	Aramoho RC	Star BC	Waikato RC	Waikato RC	Waikato RC		
2024	Lake Karapiro	Emma Twigg	Aramoho RC	Hawkes Bay RC	Waikato RC	Waikato RC	Hauraki Plains RC		
2025	Lake Ruataniwha	Kathryn Glen	Waikato RC	Ashburton RC	Ashburton RC	Waikato RC	Waikato RC		
2026	Lake Karapiro	Alana Sherman	Waikato RC	Waikato RC	Star BC	Waikato RC	Waikato RC		
