= Scown =

Scown is a surname.

Notable people with this surname include:

- Alistair Scown, New Zealand rugby player
- Percy Scown (1883-1966), Australian footballer
- Rebecca Scown (born 1983), New Zealand rower
- Shelley Scown, Australian singer
- Sonia Scown, maiden name of Sonia Waddell (born 1973), New Zealand athlete
