= Evers-Swindell =

Evers-Swindell is the surname of several prominent New Zealanders:

- Caroline Evers-Swindell (now Caroline Meyer), Olympic rower
- Georgina Evers-Swindell (now Georgina Earl), Olympic rower
- Nico Evers-Swindell, actor
