= Paula Twining =

New Zealand rower

Personal information
- Born: 23 April 1982 (age 44)
Medal record
Women's rowing
Representing New Zealand
World Championships
Silver medal – second place	2001 Lucerne	Quadruple sculls

Paula Twining (born 23 April 1982) is a New Zealand rower.

In 2001, she won silver at the World Championships in Lucerne, Switzerland as number two oarsman in the quadruple sculls with teammates Sonia Waddell (bow), and sisters Caroline and Georgina Evers-Swindell.
