= Rob Waddell =

New Zealand rower and rugby union footballer

Rob Waddell ONZM
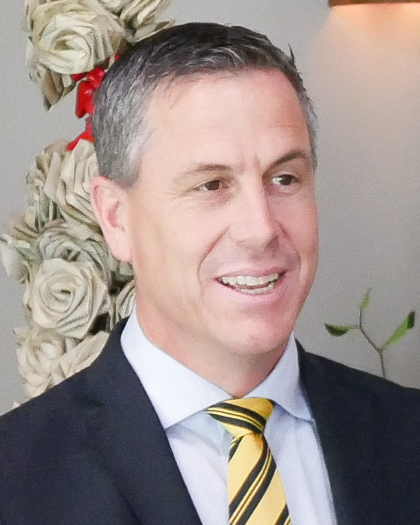
- Waddell in 2020

Personal information
- Born: 7 January 1975 (age 51) Te Kūiti, New Zealand
- Spouse: Sonia Waddell (m. 1998)
- Relatives: Madeleine Waddell (daughter); Alistair Scown (father-in-law)
Medal record
Men's rowing
Representing New Zealand
Olympic Games
Gold medal – first place	2000 Sydney	Single sculls
World Championships
Gold medal – first place	1998 Cologne	Single sculls
Gold medal – first place	1999 St. Catharines	Single sculls

Robert Norman Waddell ONZM (born 7 January 1975) is a New Zealand Olympic Gold Medalist and double World Champion Single sculler rower, and America's Cup yachtsman. He is a triple New Zealand Supreme 'Halberg Awards' Sportsperson of the year winner, 1998 to 2000. He holds the fourth fastest 2000 metre indoor rowing machine time in the world, clocking a time of 5 mins 36.6 secs (5:36.6), which was the previous world record for 19 years before the time was improved by Joshua Dunkley-Smith. It has since been surpassed by Oliver Zeidler. He has also held the record for 5000m on the rowing machine with a time of 14min 58sec. This made him the first person to go below 15 min for this distance. He holds a black belt in judo. He played rugby union for Waikato. Waddell was Chef de Mission of the 2014 and 2018 New Zealand Commonwealth Games teams, and the 2016 and 2020 Summer Olympics.

== Personal life ==
Waddell was born in 1975 in Te Kūiti. He went to school at Kings College. He studied at the University of Waikato, graduating in 1998 and being recognised as one of three distinguished alumni in a 2015 ceremony. In the 2001 New Year Honours, Waddell was appointed an Officer of the New Zealand Order of Merit, for services to rowing.

In 1998, he married fellow rower and World Rowing Championship silver medalist Sonia Scown, the daughter of a former All Black, Alistair Scown. As of 2025, their daughter, Madeleine Waddell, is a 400m track athlete.

== 2003 Team New Zealand America's Cup defence ==
Rob Waddell switched to sailing for the Team New Zealand 2003 America's Cup defence. He trained as a grinder.

== 2007 America's Cup ==
He participated again in the 2007 America's Cup. Following this, Waddell returned to rowing representing New Zealand in rowing at the 2008 Summer Olympics in the double sculls at the Beijing Olympics.

== 2008 Olympics ==
In 2008 he made a comeback to rowing after leaving the sport after the 2000 Sydney Olympics, in pursuit of a sailing career as a grinder. With 8 years out of the sport he broke the 2000 m and 5000 m world records on the rowing machine and defeated Mahé Drysdale, the world champion in the single sculls, who was also a New Zealander. As it was an Olympic year and only one crew can be sent to the Olympics in each boat class the stage was set for a battle to see who would fill the Olympic single sculls spot. Despite Waddell getting the better of Drysdale in the domestic regattas the selectors created a three-race trial to decide who would go. With the wins for each sculler tied at 1–1 it came down to a final race which Drysdale won.

Waddell was then selected into the double sculls with the young Nathan Cohen, world champion at the 2006 World University Games in single sculls, in early 2008. At the 2008 Olympic Games in Shunyi Olympic Rowing-Canoeing Park, Shunyi, Beijing in August 2008, the two finished fourth in the double sculls final.

Waddell retired from rowing to take up sailing again. Cohen went on to win the gold medal in double sculls at the next Olympic Games in 2012, with rowing partner Joseph Sullivan as Waddell's replacement.

== 2013 Team New Zealand America's Cup challenge ==
In the 2013 Louis Vuitton Cup, which Team New Zealand won over Prada Luna Rossa, Waddell was a key grinder and member of the team that eventually went on to challenge Team Oracle USA for the 2013 America's Cup.

== Medal tally ==
- Olympic medals: 1 gold
- World Championship medals: 2 gold

== Olympic Games – rowing ==
- 1996 – 7th, Single Sculls
- 2000 – 1st, Single Sculls
- 2008 – 4th, Double Sculls

== World Championships – rowing ==
- 1999 – Gold, single sculls
- 1998 – Gold, single sculls
- 1997 – 8th, single sculls
- 1995 – 10th, coxless four (4-)
- 1994 – 5th coxed pair (2+)
- 1994 – 13th coxless pair (2-)

Awards
Preceded by Jeff Wilson	New Zealand's Sportsman of the Year; 1998–2000	Succeeded by Cameron brown
Preceded by Beatrice Faumuina	Halberg Awards – Supreme Award; 1998–2000	Succeeded by Caroline & Georgina Evers-Swindell
Preceded by Beatrice Faumuina	Lonsdale Cup of the New Zealand Olympic Committee; 2000	Succeeded by Blyth Tait
