= Kaukau =

Kaukau may refer to:

- Mount Kaukau, also known as Tarikaka, a mountain in Wellington, New Zealand
- Kaukau, the Tok Pisin common name of sweet potatoes in Papua New Guinea
