= James Hill (rower) =

New Zealand rower (1930–2020)

Personal information
- Born: James Roy Hill; 20 November 1930 Hamilton, New Zealand
- Died: 8 May 2020 (aged 89) Hamilton, New Zealand
- Height: 187 cm (6 ft 2 in)
- Weight: 83 kg (183 lb)

Sport
- Sport: Rowing
Medal record
Men's rowing
Representing New Zealand
British Empire and Commonwealth Games
Gold medal – first place	1962 Perth	Single sculls
Silver medal – second place	1958 Cardiff	Single sculls
Bronze medal – third place	1958 Cardiff	Double sculls

James Roy Hill (20 November 1930 – 8 May 2020), also known as Jim Hill, was a New Zealand rower from Hamilton. A joiner by trade, he became a funeral director after his sporting career.

== Early life ==
Hill was born in Hamilton, New Zealand, in 1930. After leaving school he started out as a joiner for his father Roy, before becoming a French polisher for a funeral directors, Hill would later drive the hearse. He became self employed in 1965 as James R Hill Funeral Directors.

Hill married Doreen in 1950; they were to have two children.

== Rowing career ==
Hill took up rowing in 1947 at the Hamilton Rowing Club; his father had been captain and president for the club. James Hill was awarded life membership to the club in 2002.

Hill initial rowed in a four, but later concentrated on singles and doubles. He succeeded the five-time national singles champion Don Rowlands and from 1958 to 1963, he won the national singles titles six years back-to-back.

Hill was the only New Zealand representative at the inaugural World Rowing Championships held in September 1962. He was one of the six single scull finalists, but came last in the A final. At the November 1962 British Empire and Commonwealth Games he won the gold medal in the men's single sculls. Four years prior at the 1958 British Empire and Commonwealth Games he won the silver medal in the single sculls and also won the bronze medal as part of the double sculls.

At the 1956 Summer Olympics, Hill made the semi-finals of the single sculls. Competing at the 1960 Summer Olympics he placed fourth in the men's single sculls.

== Later life and death ==
Hill's friend Rowland was chairman of the organising committee for the 1978 World Rowing Championships at Lake Karapiro, with the whole event provided through volunteer labour. Rowland, a marine engineer by training, designed the starting pontoons and Hill built them. Hill also built the towers for the judges.

Hill retired from his funeral business in 1989. He suffered a stroke in 2010 and then went to live at Eventhorpe Care Home in Hamilton East where he was later joined by his wife. He died on 8 May 2020 at the rest home, after having celebrated their 70 years of marriage earlier in the year. The funeral, conducted by the company that he had founded and that still carries its original name, was held during COVID-19 alert level 3 conditions and only ten guests were permitted.
