= Madeleine Waddell =

New Zealand athlete (born 2008)

Personal information
- Born: 20 October 2007 (age 19)
- Relatives: Rob Waddell (father); Sonia Waddell (mother); Alistair Scown (grandfather)

Sport
- Country: New Zealand
- Sport: Athletics
- Event: 400 metres
- University team: Duke Blue Devils (2026–

Achievements and titles
- National finals: 400 m champion (2025, 2026)
- Personal bests: 400m: 52.62 (Dunedin, 2025) NU20R
Medal record
Women's athletics
Representing New Zealand
Oceania Championships
Gold medal – first place	2024 Suva	Mixed 4 × 400 m relay

Madeleine Waddell (born 20 October 2007) is a New Zealand sprinter. She is a two-time winner of the New Zealand Athletics Championships over 400 metres.

== Career ==
Waddell won her first New Zealand U20 title in the 400m hurdles in 2024, when aged 16 years-old. That year, she also won the U18 title at the 2024 national championships in 55.93 seconds. In June 2024, she was part of the New Zealand mixed 4 x 400 metres team which won the gold medal at the 2024 Oceania Athletics Championships in Suva, Fiji in 3:26.12. In August, Waddell broke the New Zealand under-17 and under-18 national records in the 400 metres at the 2024 World Athletics U20 Championships in Lima, Peru, where she set a new personal best 54.02 seconds in the heats, before running 53.50 seconds in the semi-finals.

In February 2025, Waddell broke the New Zealand under-20 record for the 400 metres with a time of 53.16 seconds at the 2025 Sir Graeme Douglas International Meet at Waitakere, Auckland. On 8 March 2025, Waddell won her first title in the women’s 400m at the New Zealand Athletics Championships in Dunedin, running a personal best time of 52.62 seconds, lowering her own U18, U19 and U20 New Zealand records, despite being the youngest runner in the field. She also won the national U20 title over 200 meters in a personal best 23.91 seconds.

Waddell joined the Dutch Olympic sprint squad to train at altitude in Potchefstroom, South Africa, prior to the 2026 season. On 7 March 2026, she retained her title in the women’s 400m at the New Zealand Athletics Championships in a time of 53.71 seconds.

In 2026, Waddell enrolled at Duke University in Durham, North Carolina, where she will compete for the Duke Blue Devils track and field team.

== Personal life ==
From Waikato, she is the daughter of New Zealand international rowers Rob Waddell and Sonia Waddell, and granddaughter of rugby international Alistair Scown. She has siblings Hayden and Sophie. She attended St Peters School in Cambridge, New Zealand, where she served as head girl, and her mother Sonia, also a former athlete and cyclist, coaches the athletics team.
