= Lake Papaitonga =

Lake in New Zealand

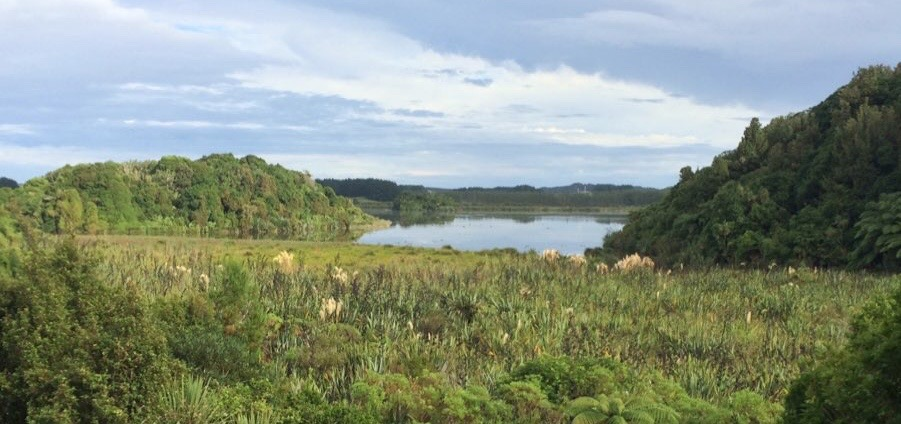
- Lake Papaitonga

- Location within North Island
- Location: Southern Manawatū-Whanganui region, North Island
- Coordinates: 40.6450°S 175.2259°E
- Basin countries: New Zealand
- Surface area: 61.8 ha (153 acres)
- Average depth: 1 m (3.3 ft)
- Islands: Motukiwi (Papaitonga) and Motungarara (Papawharangi)

Lake Papaitonga is located in the Horowhenua, an area of the southern Manawatū-Whanganui region in New Zealand's North Island. Part of the Papaitonga Scenic Reserve, a 135 ha area of forest and wetland, it is the only remaining lake bordered by undisturbed native forest in the Horowhenua region, and contains two populations of endangered native land snails. The traditional home of the Muaūpoko people, the lake was the scene of their massacre and defeat by invading chief Te Rauparaha. The naturalist Walter Buller later managed to purchase Papaitonga and its environs for his country home, which led to its forest being preserved and it eventually becoming a scenic reserve.

== Name ==
Although it is generally known as Papaitonga, the lake's traditional name is Waiwiri or "trembling waters". Papaitonga, "beauty of the south", is the original name of its largest island in the lake. Over time that name came to be used for the scenic reserve around the lake, and eventually for the lake itself. The lake is increasingly being referred to as Lake Waiwiri.

The names Motukiwi and Motungarara, often used to refer to the islands Papaitonga and Papawharangi respectively, are not traditional Māori names; they were invented by Walter Buller in the 1890s.

== Description ==
The lake lies on a sandy plain in the Horowhenua, 6 kilometres (3.7 mi) southwest of central Levin and 5.9 kilometres (4 mi) from Hokio Beach on the Tasman Sea. It covers 61.8 hectares (153 acres), but is shallow, less than 1 metre (3 ft) deep. The lake was once a sandy coastal lagoon at the mouth of the Ohau River, and the forested terraces on its landward side were once sea cliffs. Over time, sand dunes built up, the river changed its course, and the sea retreated, until about 9000 years ago the lagoon was dammed and became a dune lake. The bottom of the lake now consists of 15 m of accumulated silt and mud over the original sand, and preserves layers of volcanic ash from eruptions 8,000 and 5,900 years ago. Fossil pollen suggests it was surrounded by continuous forest even after human settlement of the plains. Lake Papaitonga is fed by groundwater and various small streams and springs, and drained by the Waiwiri Stream. Because it is bordered by forest, the lake is oligotrophic, with low levels of phosphorus and nitrogen. The lake was relatively deep and stable until the 1940s, but with the increase in horticulture nearby and the digging of irrigation bores it is becoming increasingly shallow.

== History ==
The lake was the home of the Māori Muaūpoko iwi, who lived in several villages around it and harvested longfin and shortfin eels, waterfowl, and kākahi from its wetlands. Brown teal were chased into snares hung just above the water. The forest was preserved for its groves of kiekie, which produced a sweet fruit and much-prized succulent flower bracts (called tāwhara). The main island, Papaitonga (1.2 ha), was cleared and planted in groves of karaka trees, and a smaller man-made island, Papawharangi (0.3 ha), was built in 1820 from canoe-loads of soil and mussel shells. Both were fortified to use as pā in times of war.

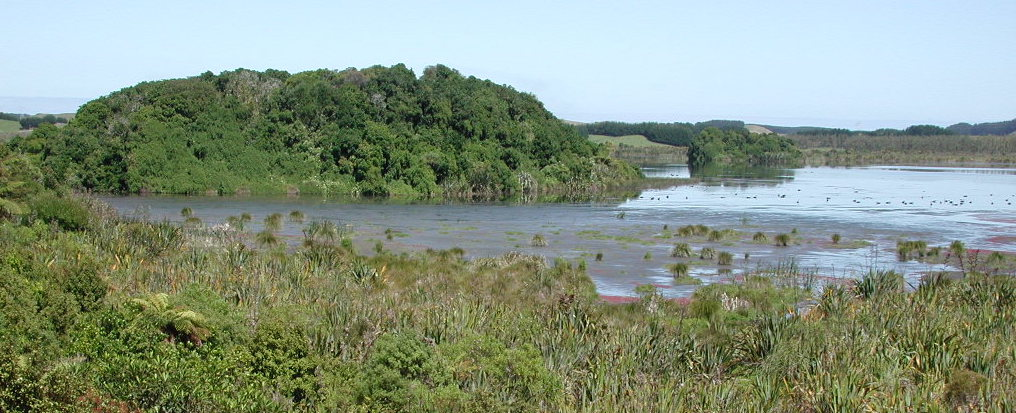
Lake Papaitonga, showing the two islands Motukiwi (left) and Motungarara

In 1822, Te Rauparaha and the Ngāti Toa arrived in the area. They were initially welcomed, but after the murder of a Muaūpoko woman Te Rauparaha narrowly escaped being assassinated; his son and daughter were killed. He and his warriors vowed revenge, and eventually returned and massacred 600 Muaūpoko on Papaitonga Island; the tribe was defeated and lost their territory, influence, and prestige. The lake was taken over by a hapū of Ngāti Raukawa, and ever since ownership and use of it has been contested by both them and descendants of the surviving Muaūpoko.

The Muaūpoko had their revenge during the New Zealand Wars of the 1860s, under the leadership of the chief Te Kēpa Te Rangihiwinui, who went by the Pākehā name of Major Kemp. Te Kēpa used his status as a war hero to keep hold of traditional Muaūpoko land, but was unable to prevent disputes with other iwi and within his own tribe, leading to the sale of land for railways and farming. Court cases led to debate in parliament and finally in 1896 a Royal Commission into land sales in the Horowhenua.

Lawyer and ornithologist Walter Buller, who had represented Te Kēpa in the legal dispute, took the lake and 1300 acres of land as his fee in 1891. Governor Sir George Grey had previously attempted to buy Papaitonga in 1864 with Buller's help, but been rebuffed. Buller had long coveted Papaitonga: when he first saw the lake he was "struck by its singular loveliness", and called it "one of the prettiest bits of scenery in New Zealand".

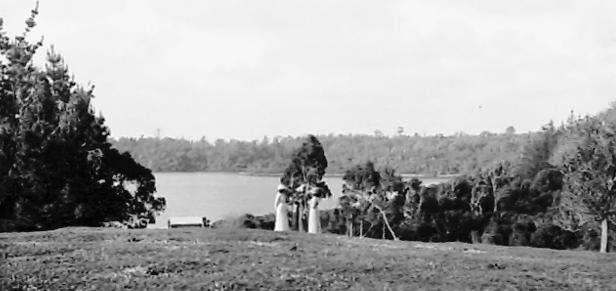
Lake Papaitonga in the early 20th century, in a photo by Leslie Adkin

Buller intended to build a wildlife sanctuary and country estate around the lake, and carefully preserved the forest and wetland, while introducing species of birds both native and exotic; five white swans from the Royal flock in Kew Gardens were released in 1893. He renamed the two islands in the lake: Papaitonga became Motukiwi (kiwi island), because he released several species of kiwi there, and Papawharangi was renamed Motungarara (demon island) for the guardian tuatara he released on it.

On "Motukiwi", Buller erected a grave marker carved from the river waka Nga Rangi-ō-Rehua, which commemorated Te Riunga, an ancestress of Te Kēpa who was killed during the massacre on the island. (The marker, captured by British troops during the siege of Pipiriki on the Whanganui River in 1865, was taken from the cemetery at Pūtiki near Whanganui by Te Kēpa and gifted to Buller. It went to the Dominion Museum in 1911, and was returned to Pipiriki in 2019.)

Buller also installed a collection of carved monuments, including a pataka (food storehouse) and other waka. He however was never able to build the grand country home he desired, and moved to England after the Horowhenua land sale scandals, where he died in 1906. His house at Papaitonga burnt down in 1904.

Papaitonga was a popular recreation spot in the early 1900s. In 1901, 11.5 ha of the forest around the lake was reserved from Crown land for 'the preservation of native bush', and in 1903 the government's Scenery Preservation Committee resolved to clear a space in the forest for picnics. In 1930 the forest was made a scenic reserve, and the lake was purchased by the government from a Ngāti Raukawa farmer in 1981 and added to the reserve.

== Biology and conservation ==
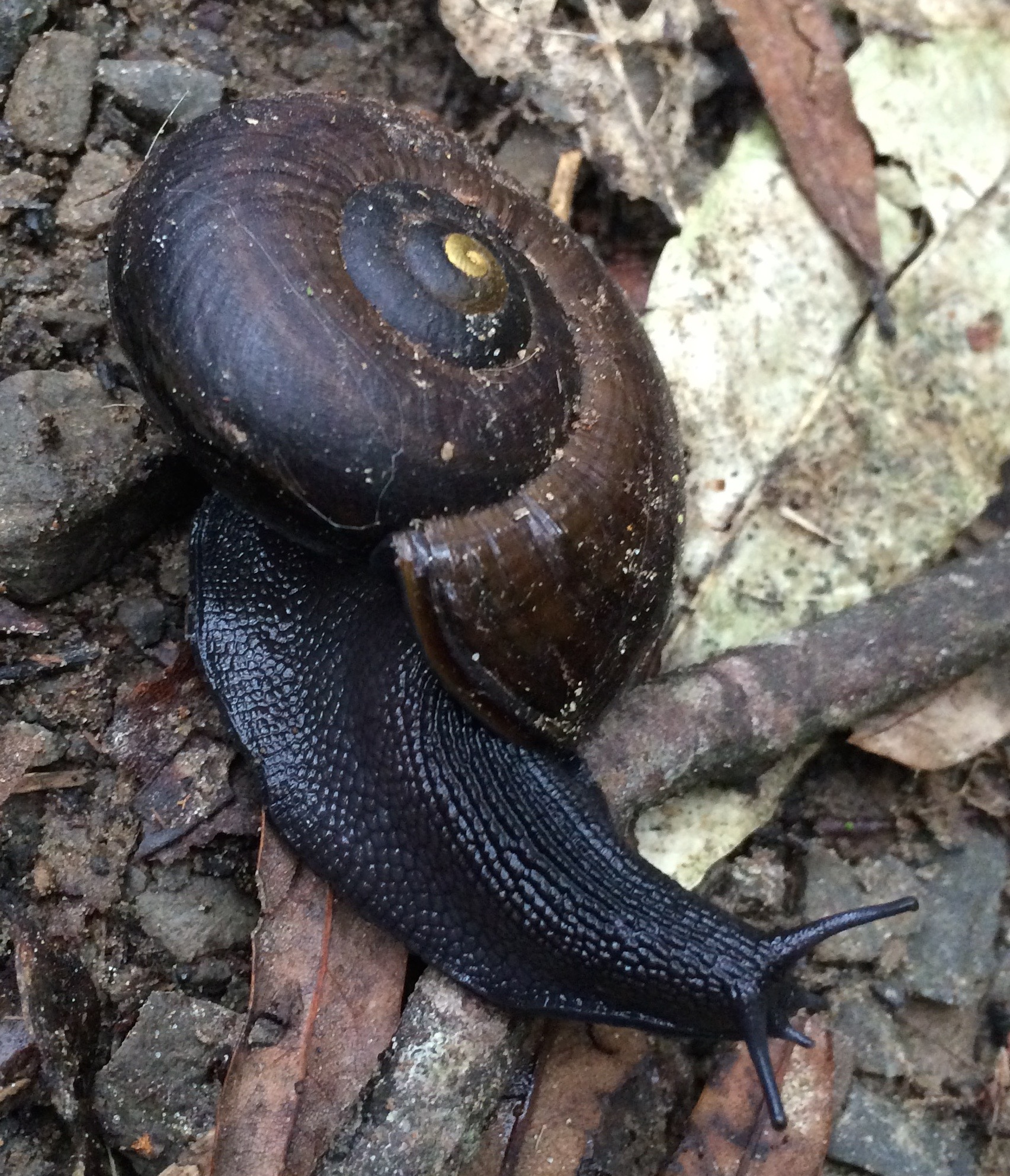
Powelliphanta traversi traversi at the northeast end of Papaitonga Reserve

The lake is bordered on two sides by wetland podocarp forest. The wetland forest is dominated by kahikatea, pukatea, and swamp maire, with substantial amounts of kiekie in the understorey. The drier forest on the higher surrounding terraces is largely tawa, kohekohe, and māhoe, with some rimu and tītoki. The rare leafless mistletoe Korthalsella salicornioides is found in the manuka forest on the fringes. Papaitonga Scenic Reserve is scientifically important, as it contains the last remaining sequence of wetland forest grading into dry terrace forest in the Wellington and Horowhenua area. The southwest to northwest shores are pasture and largely bare of trees.

Lake Papaitonga has long been a waterfowl sanctuary; when Buller lived there, up to 200 brown teal (today an endangered species) could be seen at a time. Black swan, shoveler, mallards, and dabchicks live on the lake, and kingfishers, pūkeko, harriers, kererū, and welcome swallows are also present.

Northeastern Papaitonga Scenic Reserve contains most of the world's population of the endangered land snail Powelliphanta traversi traversi, found in the damp lowland gullies – this is one of only two places in the world this snail occurs (the other is Waiopehu Reserve near Levin). There is also a population of the closely related subspecies P. t. florida, living at the southeastern side of the lake. One hypothesis is that these two subspecies were formerly separated by the Ohau River, which once ran north of its present course into Lake Horowhenua. The shifting of the river's course has brought the two snail populations into contact at Papaitonga. These native snails are threatened by rats, which take up to 25% of adults annually, by introduced blackbirds and song thrushes, and by the gradual drying out of Papaitonga from construction of drainage ditches, artesian bores, and farm irrigation.

The reserve is administered by the Department of Conservation (DOC), who undertake possum and rat control, and have banned dogs, hunting, and mountain biking. In 2017, DOC captured an Australian water dragon that had been released into the reserve, and another was spotted a year later.
