= Des Simonson =

New Zealand rower

Personal information
- Full name: Desmond Christian Simonson
- Born: 17 April 1926
- Died: 5 April 2004 (aged 77)

Sport
- Country: New Zealand
- Sport: Rowing
- Club: Aramoho Rowing Club
- Coached by: William Webb
Medal record
Men's rowing
Representing New Zealand
British Empire Games
Silver medal – second place	1950 Auckland	Double Sculls

Desmond Christian Simonson (17 April 1926 – 5 April 2004) was a New Zealand rower. At the 1950 British Empire Games in Auckland, Simonson (bow) and Joe Schneider (stroke) won the silver medal in the men's double sculls. They finished with a time of 7:32, 10 seconds behind the winning Australian crew. Both Simonson and Schneider were members of the Aramoho Rowing Club in Whanganui, where they were coached by the former world professional single scull champion, William Webb.
