= West End Rowing Club =

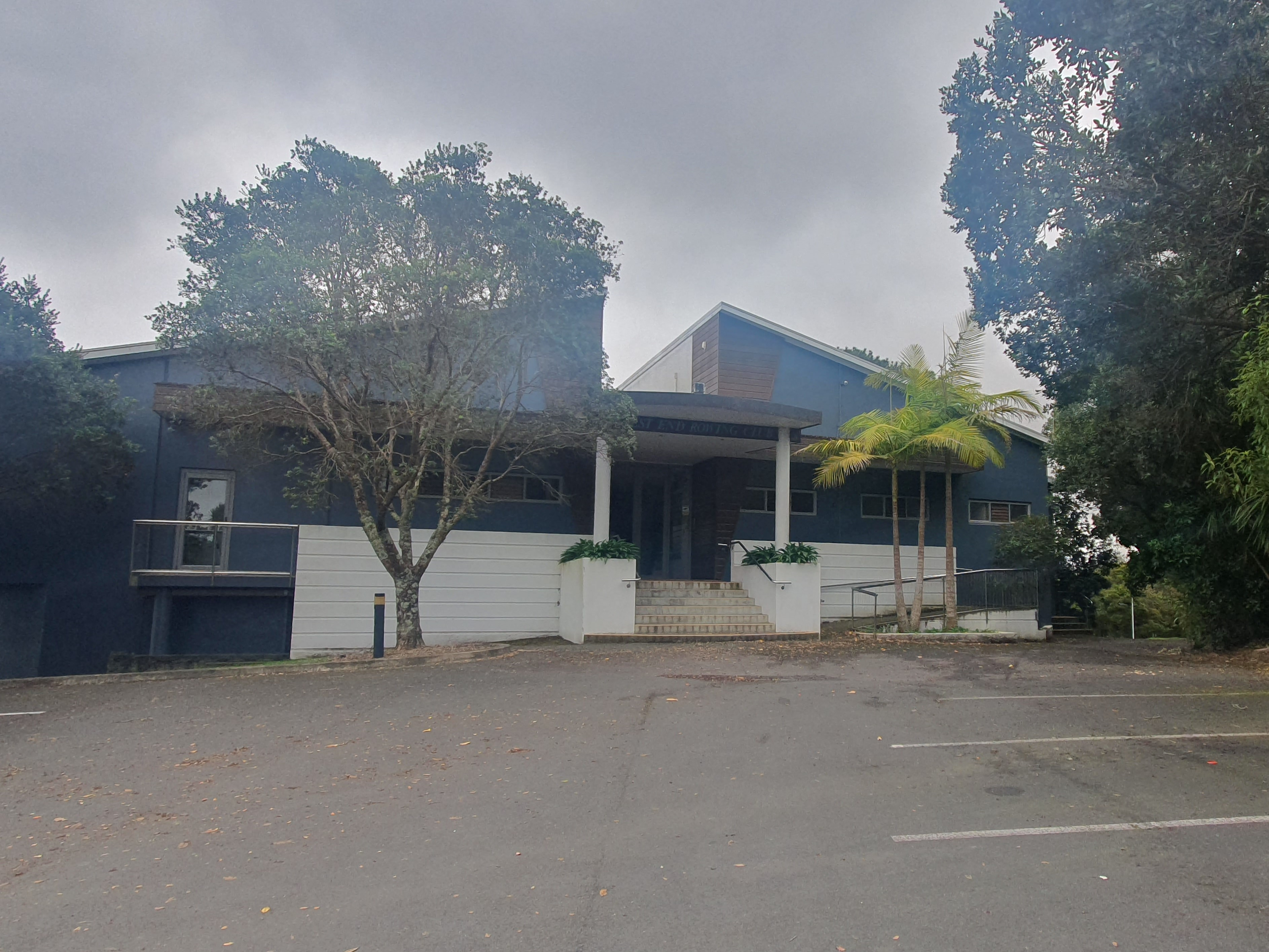
- Motto: Ake Ake Kia Kaha
- Location: Avondale, Auckland
- Coordinates: 36.87912°S 174.66417°E
- Home water: The Whau
- Founded: 1884
- Affiliations: New Zealand Rowing
- Website: www.werc.co.nz

Notable members
- Tony Hurt; Dudley Storey; Shane O'Brien; Mahé Drysdale

West End Rowing Club is based at Saunders Reserve on Rosebank Peninsula, in Avondale, Auckland, New Zealand. It has won numerous national, British Empire Games, Commonwealth, World and Olympic titles, with four club members winning five Olympic gold medals.

A current "West Ender" is Mahé Drysdale, five time Single Scull World Champion and Olympic gold medallist.

== History ==
The West End Rowing Club was founded in Ponsonby in 1884, with training taking place in St Mary's Bay (now Westhaven). Success came early to the Club with the first regatta win being recorded in 1885. As the city of Auckland developed so did West End with the growing in numbers and successes over the early decades of the twentieth century. Even the destruction of virtually all of the Club's boats in a cyclone which struck Auckland in 1914 where large seas flooded the boathouse was overcome.

In 1949 the club won its first red-coat (premier title) with victory in the premier eight on Lake Karapiro. The crew included: Don Rowlands, Donald Adam, Murray Ashby, Kerry Ashby, Bruce Culpan, Thomas Engel, Grahame Jarratt, Edwin Smith and Bill Tinnock. This entire crew was selected as the New Zealand eight for the 1950 Empire Games where they finished a close second, only a foot behind the gold medallists, Australia.

After this first redcoat the 1950s–70s were a golden era for West End Rowing Club with the club winning a 47 redcoats and two Olympic gold medals. West End Rowing Club celebrated its centenary in 1984 with a premier title and another Olympic gold.

After 115 years based at St Mary's Bay the club moved out to the Whau River in Avondale due to redevelopment at Westhaven. Helen Clark officially opened the new clubhouse in October 2001.

West End Rowing Club celebrated its 125th anniversary in 2009.

West End sent its national championship eight from 2010 to race at the Henley Royal Regatta in the same year. With two replacements, they managed to get into the final of the Thames Challenge Cup on their first time. Mahé Drysdale also reclaimed his title in the Diamond Sculls at the same regatta.

== Olympians ==
Dudley Storey won the club's first Olympic gold medal at the 1968 Olympics in Mexico City in the coxed four. Four years later Tony Hurt won another for the club when he stroked the New Zealand men's eight to victory in Munich. Shane O'Brien won a gold medal at the 1984 Olympics in Los Angeles in the men's coxless four.

Mahé Drysdale won gold medals at the 2012 and 2016 Olympics in the single scull. Juliette Haigh won bronze at the 2012 Olympics in the women's pair.
