= Carl Meyer (rower) =

New Zealand rower

Personal information
- Full name: Carl James Meyer
- Born: 3 September 1981 (age 44) Geraldine, New Zealand
- Height: 193 cm (6 ft 4 in)
- Weight: 93 kg (205 lb)
- Spouse: Caroline Evers-Swindell

Sport
- Sport: Rowing
Medal record
Men's rowing
Representing New Zealand
World Rowing Championships
Gold medal – first place	2007 Munich	M4-

Carl James Meyer (born 3 September 1981) is a New Zealand rower. He competed at the 2004 Summer Olympics and the 2008 Summer Olympics.

Meyer is married to double Olympic gold medallist Caroline Evers-Swindell. During his career, Meyer was nicknamed "Bootcamp" due to his hard work ethic.
