= Mount Kaukau =

Mountain in Wellington, New Zealand

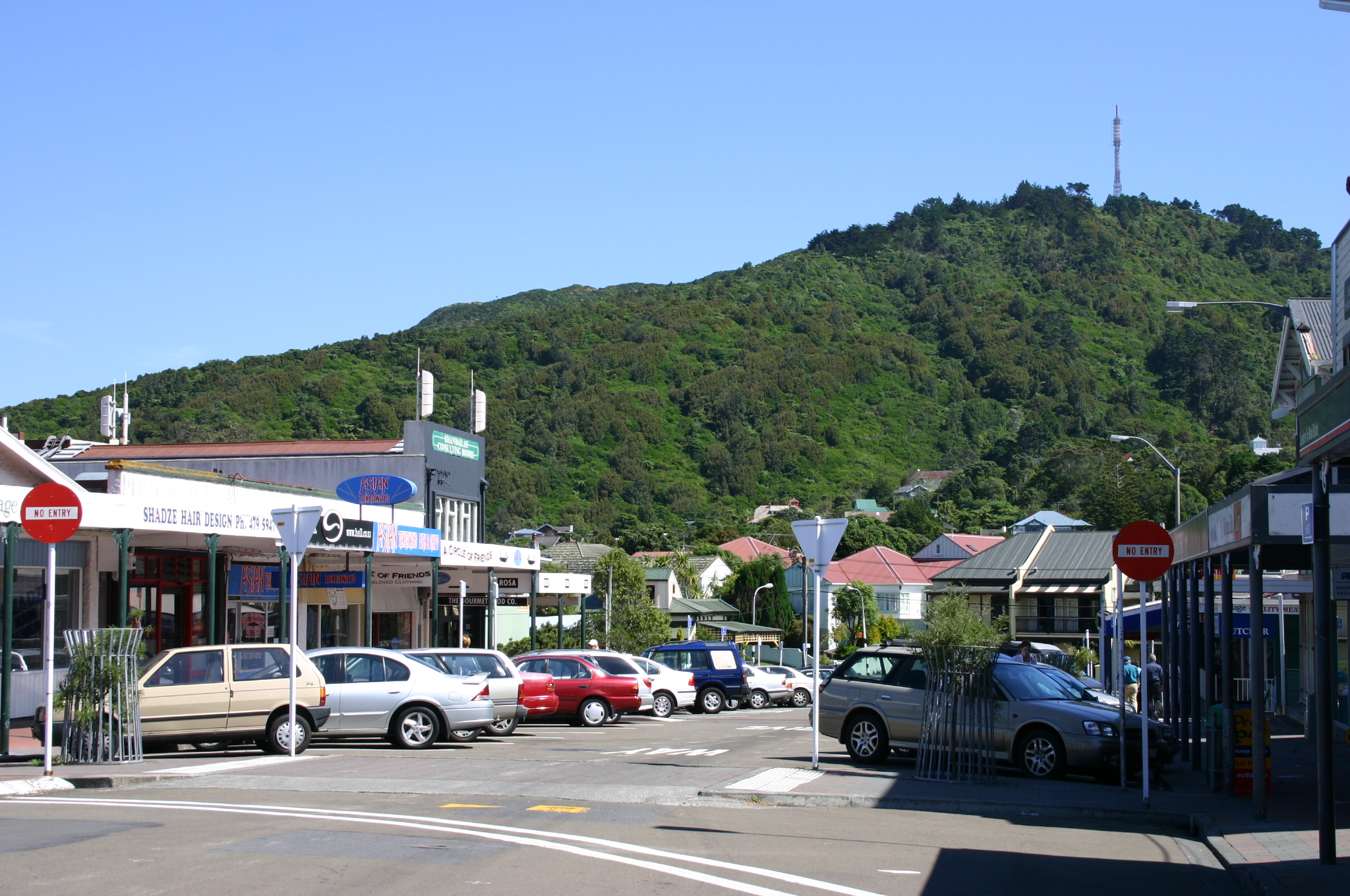

Highest point
- Elevation: 445 m (1,460 ft)
- Coordinates: 41°13′53.29″S 174°46′40.76″E

Naming
- Native name: Tarikākā (Māori)

Geography
- Country: New Zealand
- Region: Wellington

Mount Kaukau (Māori: [kaʉkaʉ]) is a large hill in the northern suburbs of Wellington, New Zealand near Johnsonville, Khandallah and Ngaio. The summit is 445 m (1,460 ft) above sea level and is the most visible high point in the Wellington landscape further accentuated by Wellington's main television transmitter mast, which stands 122 m (400 ft) from the summit. The city, harbour and the Remutaka and Tararua Ranges can be seen from the summit. On a clear day Mount Tapuae-o-Uenuku and the Kaikōura Ranges in the South Island may be seen, whilst northwest is the Porirua Basin and the Tasman Sea.

== Name ==
The hill's original name Tarikākā means 'where the parrots rested' and is shared with the nearby settlement in Ngaio at the base of the mountain. Before the clearing of the native tōtara forest on the slopes and general area, the native parrot kākā was common through the city. Over a hundred years later today, the population of kākā has begun to regenerate thanks mostly to the efforts at Zealandia, and are becoming a more regular sight throughout the city and in the rejuvenating native forest on the slopes of Mount Kaukau.

== Slopes and surrounding area ==
Much of the eastern 'city side' slopes of Mount Kaukau make up Khandallah Park, which is one of the oldest parks in New Zealand, established in 1888 and then registered as a domain in 1909. Khandallah Park has more than 60 hectares of native forest. Native birds such as the kererū, tūī and New Zealand fantail are common sights when walking through the native forest. Stumps of the old totara trees can also be seen walking through the first lower parts of the forest. In mid 2017 an old bunker off Woodmancote Road, at the base of Mount Kaukau, was rediscovered after it had been sealed off and forgotten many years previously. The bunker in an 'H' shape, had been built for Royal New Zealand Signals Corps in 1942. Due to poor construction the bunker was very leaky and was never used. Mount Kaukau forms part of the Northern Skyline track from Johnsonville to Karori and Makara.

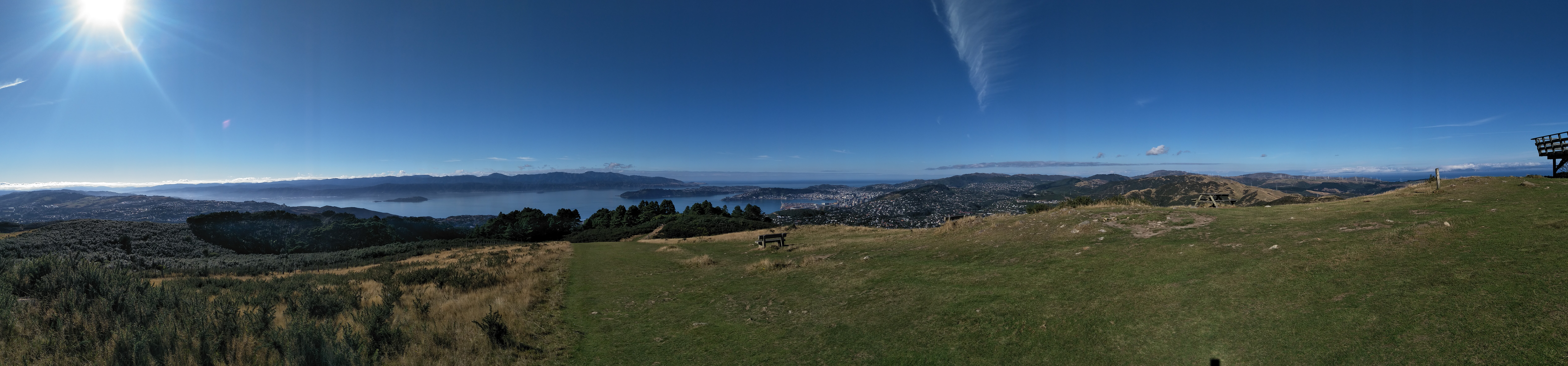
Panoramic view from Mt Kaukau over Wellington harbour

== Recreation ==
Khandallah Park has 9 kilometres of walking tracks allowing access to the peak of Mt Kaukau from Khandallah, Johnsonville, Ngaio and Crofton Downs. Some tracks are also open to mountain biking and e-biking.

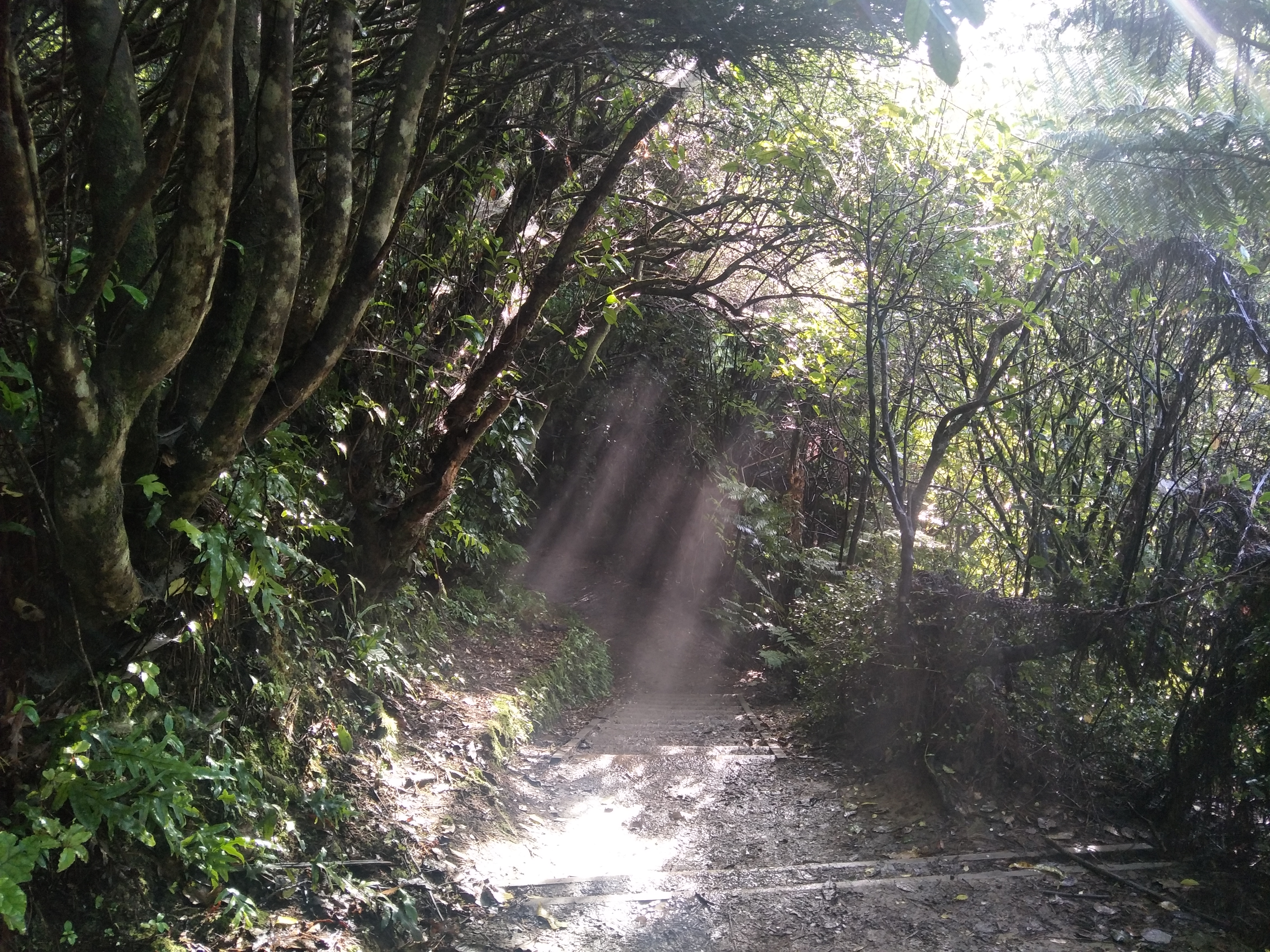
View of Northern Walkway (descending Mt Kaukau)

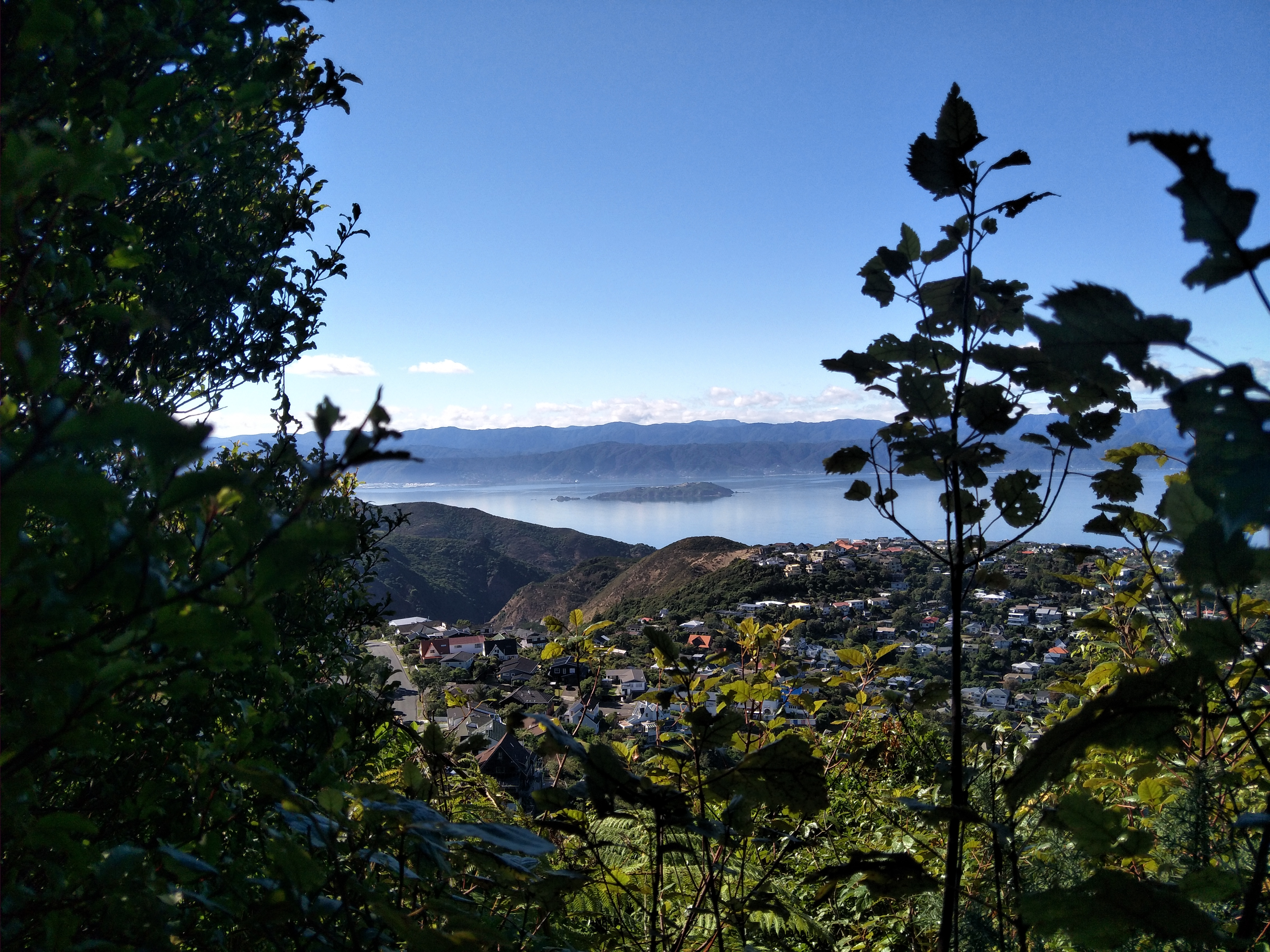
View of Matiu / Somes Island from Mt Kaukau track

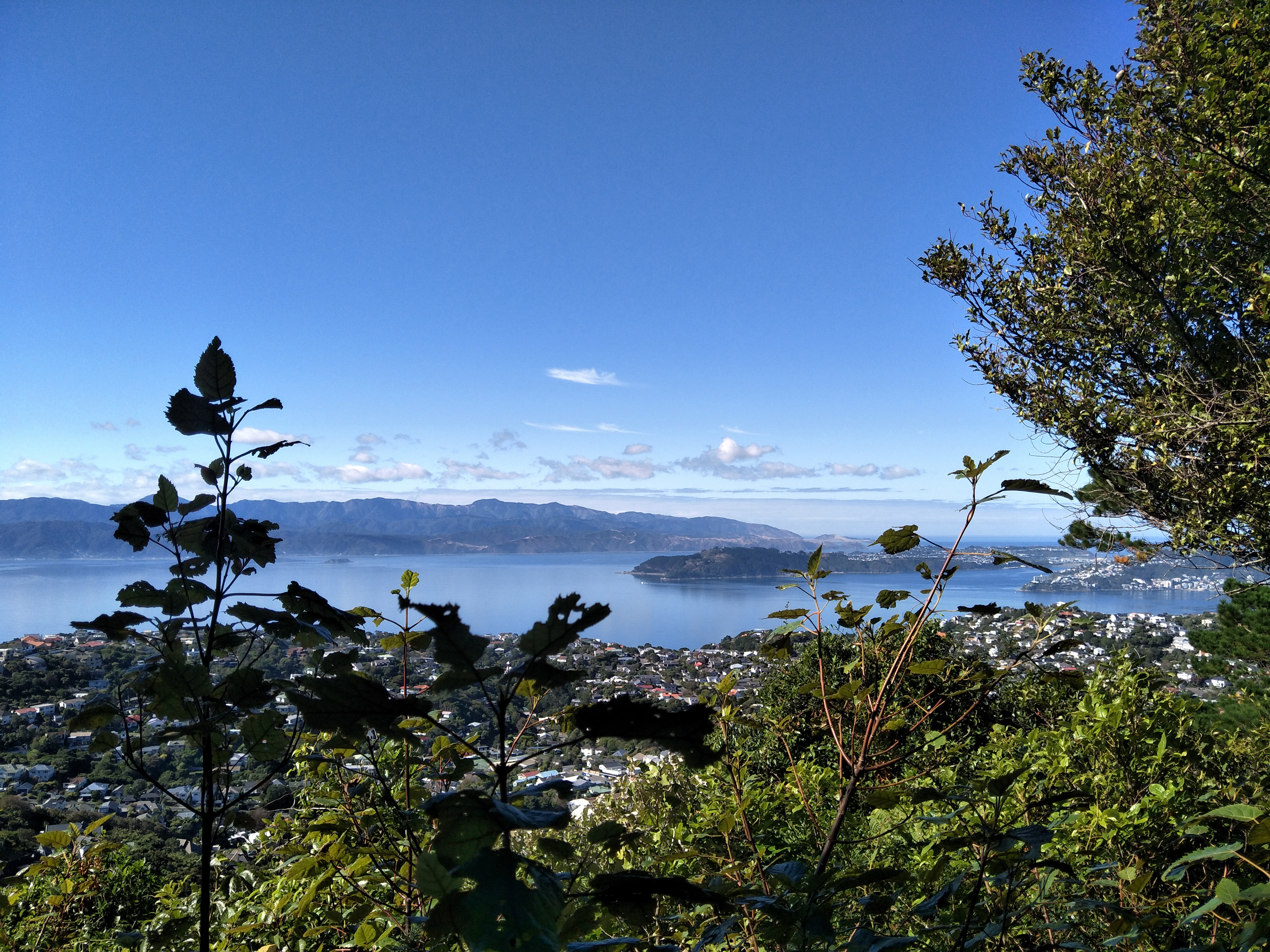
View of Miramar Peninsula from Mt Kaukau track

== Transmitter ==
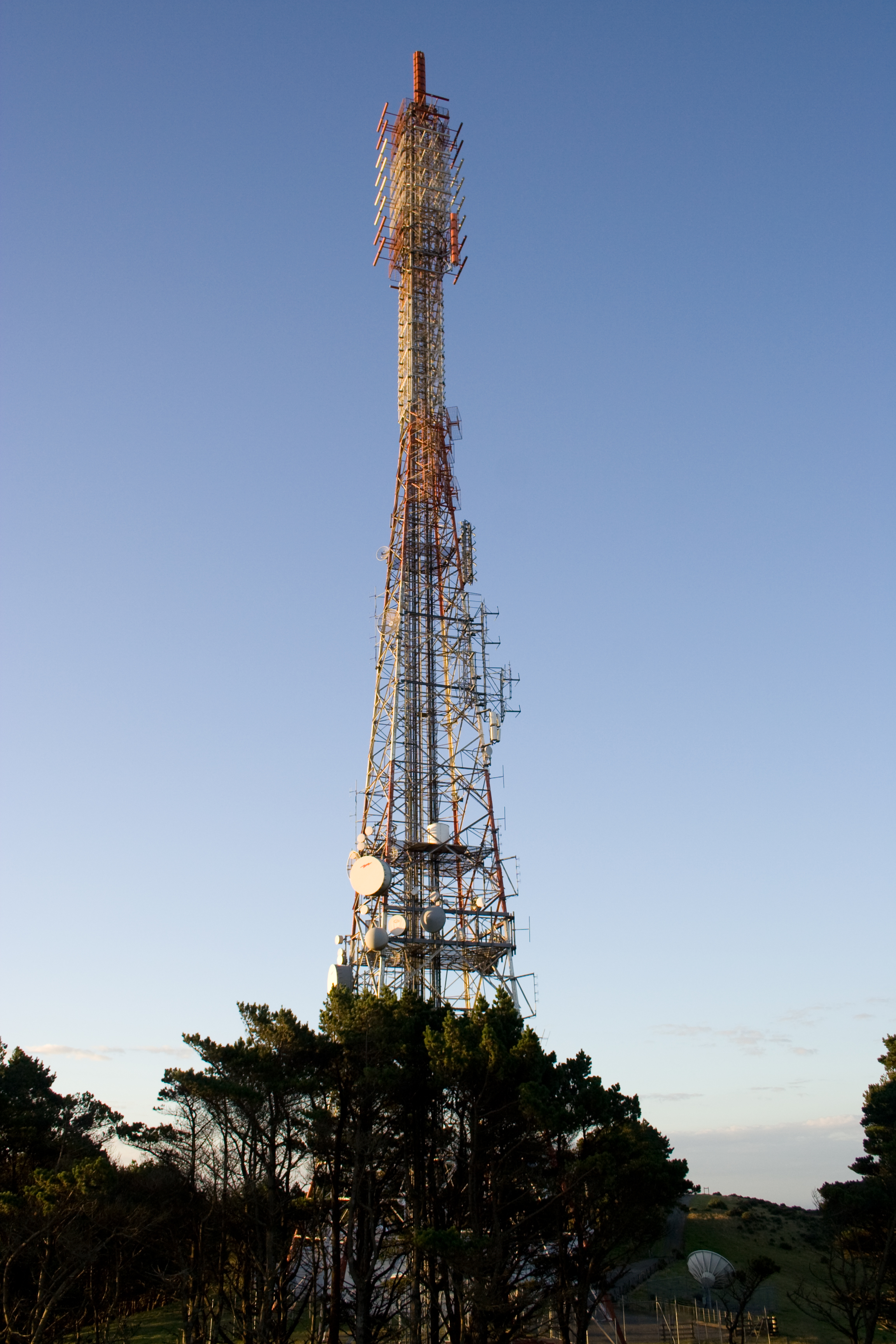
Close-up of the Mount Kaukau television transmitter in 2008.

The Mount Kaukau television transmitter was approved for construction in February 1965, at a cost of £410,000. It incorporated 100 kW television transmitter and a 122-metre transmission tower to transmit television channel WNTV1 (now part of TVNZ 1). The new transmitter would be ten times as powerful and offer a much improved coverage area over WNTV1's existing transmitter at Mount Victoria. The transmitter was officially opened by Prime Minister Keith Holyoake on 22 February 1967.

Today, the Mount Kaukau transmitter is the main television and FM radio transmitter for the Wellington metropolitan area.

In May 2022, Kordia removed the top 18 metres of the aerial, as the section was redundant following the end of analogue television broadcast.

The UHF TV antennas are located 93 metres up the tower, while the FM radio antennas are located 65 metres up the tower.

=== Transmission frequencies ===
The following table contains television and radio frequencies currently operating at Mount Kaukau:

TV Channel	Transmit Channel	Transmit Frequency	Band	Power (kW)
Kordia digital	28	530.00 MHz	UHF	40
Sky digital	30	546.00 MHz	UHF	40
Discovery Channel digital	32	562.00 MHz	UHF	40
TVNZ digital	34	578.00 MHz	UHF	40
Kordia digital	36	594.00 MHz	UHF	40
Māori Television digital	38	610.00 MHz	UHF	40
Radio Station	Transmit Channel	Transmit Frequency	Band	Power (kW)
Newstalk ZB		89.3 MHz	VHF	40
The Hits		90.1 MHz	VHF	40
ZM		90.9 MHz	VHF	80
The Edge		91.7 MHz	VHF	80
RNZ Concert		92.5 MHz	VHF	80
Radio Hauraki		93.3 MHz	VHF	40
The Breeze		94.1 MHz	VHF	40
Atiawa Toa FM		94.9 MHz	VHF	5
Coast		95.7 MHz	VHF	40
The Rock		96.5 MHz	VHF	16
The Sound		97.3 MHz	VHF	16
Magic		98.9 MHz	VHF	16
More FM		99.7 MHz	VHF	40
Mai FM		100.5 MHz	VHF	16
Radio New Zealand National		101.3 MHz	VHF	8
PMN 531		103.7 MHz	VHF	8
to be determined		104.5 MHz	VHF	8
Radio Tarana		105.3 MHz	VHF	2
Wellington Access Radio		106.1 MHz	VHF	2.5

==== Former analogue television frequencies ====
The following frequencies were used until 29 September 2013, when Kaukau switched off analogue broadcasts (see Digital changeover dates in New Zealand).

TV Channel	Transmit Channel	Transmit Frequency	Band	Power (kW)
TV One	1	45.25 MHz	VHF	100
Four	2	55.25 MHz	VHF	10
TV2	5	182.25 MHz	VHF	200
TV3	11	224.25 MHz	VHF	200
Māori Television	44	655.25 MHz	UHF	200
Prime	60	783.25 MHz	UHF	200

== Natural history ==
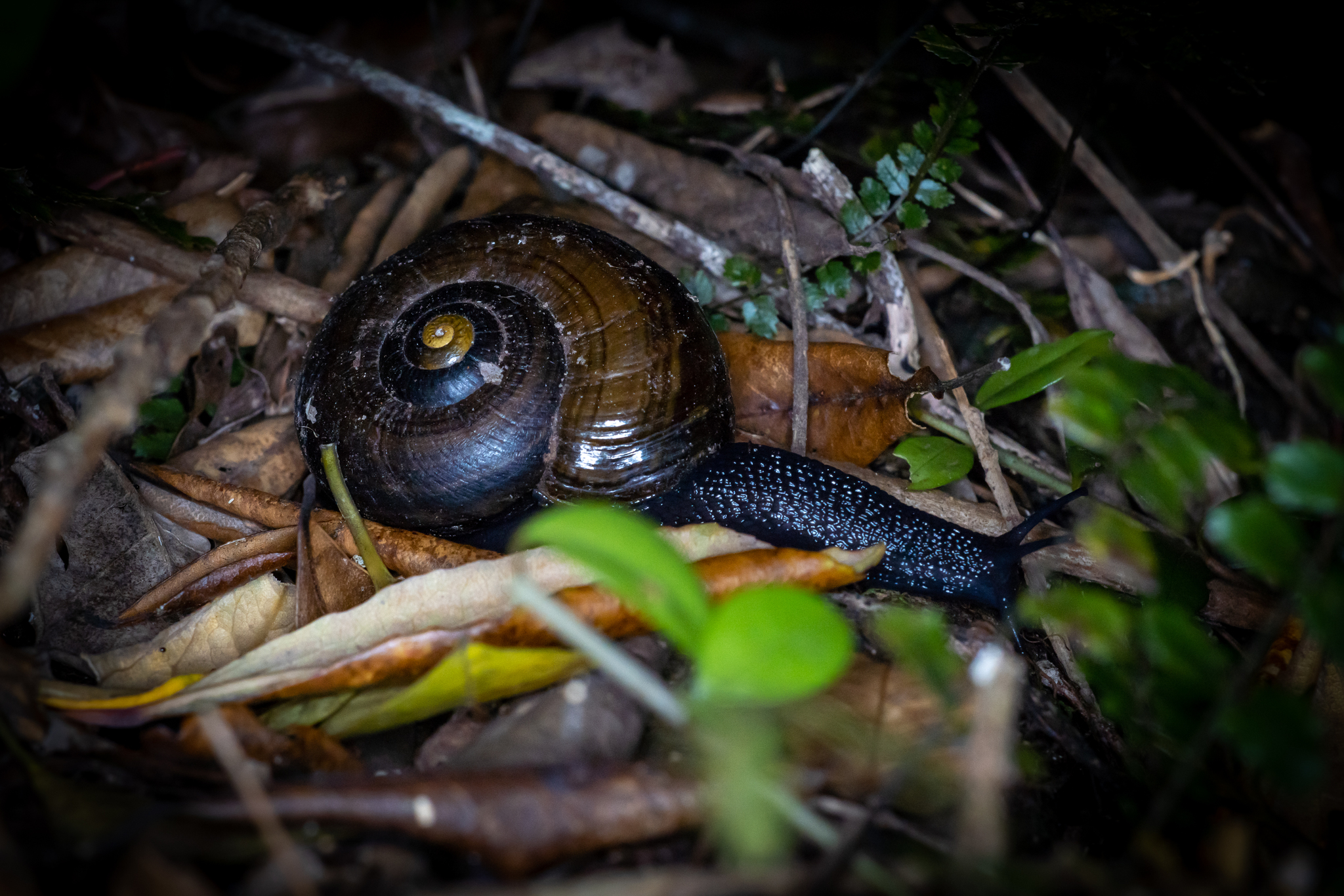
Powelliphanta traversi form 'latizona' at Mount Kaukau

In the 1940s, around forty individuals of the giant snail Powelliphanta traversi 'form latizona' were translocated from Greenaway's Bush (near Levin) to Mount Kaukau, which lacked Powelliphanta. This population is still present to this day. Under the New Zealand Threat Classification System, this species is listed as "Nationally Endangered".

== Kaukau challenge ==
Every year Khandallah School, which is at the base of Mount Kaukau, organises a fun walk / fun run from the school to the summit and back, called the Kaukau Challenge. The Kaukau Challenge has been an annual event since 2006 with about 500 people taking part each year.

== Snowfall of 2011 ==
In mid-August 2011, two Wellington men, Nick Fone and Daniel McFadyen claimed to be the first people to ski and snowboard down Mount Kaukau when they took advantage of the unusual weather pattern delivering snow to most parts of the North Island. As Wellington has a temperate climate, snow down to near sea level is extremely rare, happening less often than once every 15 years.
