= Digital changeover dates in New Zealand =

Digital terrestrial television replacement process

The digital changeover is the name given to the process by which analogue television in New Zealand was replaced with digital terrestrial television. It is sometimes referred to as the "analogue switch off".

In New Zealand, the switch off of analogue signals started in September 2012, with the digital switchover being completed in Hawke's Bay in the North island and the West Coast region of the South Island. The country's switch to digital terrestrial reception was completed on 1 December 2013 when analogue transmissions were switched off in the upper North Island.

During 2011–12, the digital terrestrial television network was extended to cover some six-sevenths of the country's people. The Ministry for Culture and Heritage's "Going Digital" group set up an assistance scheme for the first two regions which would complete the changeover, Hawke's Bay in the North island and the West Coast region of the South Island. Similar schemes were run in each region as its changeover date approached.

== Switchover dates ==
These are the dates at which switchover took place in each region of New Zealand.

Note that area boundaries are based on transmitters - it is possible for someone on the fringe areas of a changeover region to pick up an analogue signal from another transmitter outside the region. For example. Blenheim and parts of Marlborough can pick up analogue television from Wellington's Mount Kaukau transmitter (this ability was most notably demonstrated during the 1968 Wahine disaster, where due to an extratropical cyclone cancelling flights and the then lack of an inter-island network, news footage was relayed to the South Island by filming a Blenheim television tuned to Wellington then rushing the film to Christchurch by road to be broadcast.)

| Region | Description of area covered | Major transmitter(s) | Date and time of changeover |
|---|---|---|---|
| West Coast | Most of the South Island's West Coast region and parts of the Tasman Region - Haast to Karamea, including Murchison, Saint Arnaud and Maruia | Mount Murchison, Mount Rochfort, Paparoa | 30 September 2012 (0200 NZST/0300 NZDT) |
| Hawke's Bay | Central eastern North Island - Norsewood to Tutira | Mount Erin, Mount Threave | 30 September 2012 (0200 NZST/0300 NZDT) |
| Remainder of the South Island | Remainder of the West Coast and Tasman Regions, all of the Southland, Otago, Canterbury, and Marlborough Regions, including the cities of Christchurch, Dunedin, Invercargill, and Nelson | Mount Campbell, Grampians, Kaikoura, Sugarloaf, Mount Mary, Cave Hill, Mount Studholme, Little Mount Ida, Obelisk, Mid Dome, Mount Cargill, Blue Mountains, Kuriwao, Hedgehope, Forest Hills | 29 April 2013 (0200 NZST) |
| Southern North Island | All of the Wellington, Manawatū-Whanganui region (except Taumarunui), and Taranaki Regions | Kaukau, Fitzherbert, Baxters Knob, Popoiti, Otahoua, Ngarara, Forest Heights, Wharite, Mount Taranaki | 29 September 2013 (0200 NZST/0300 NZDT) |
| East Cape-Gisborne | Northeastern North Island - Gisborne region and northern Hawke's Bay Region | Whakapunake | 29 September 2013 (0200 NZST/0300 NZDT) |
| Remainder of the North Island | Northern North Island, including the cities of Auckland, Tauranga, Rotorua, and Hamilton, plus Taumarunui | Puketutu, Maungataniwha, Hikurangi, Horokaka, Sky Tower, Waiatarua, Te Aroha, Ruru (Te Miro), Kopukairua, Pukepoto, Whakaroa, Tuhingamata | 1 December 2013 (0200 NZDT) |

== See also ==
- Freeview (New Zealand)
- Digital television transition
- Digital switchover dates in the United Kingdom
