= Joe Schneider =

New Zealand rower

Personal information
- Full name: Joseph Conrad Schneider
- Born: 11 September 1926
- Died: 3 March 2015 (aged 86)
- Occupation: Cabinet maker

Sport
- Country: New Zealand
- Sport: Rowing
- Club: Aramoho Rowing Club
- Coached by: William Webb
Medal record
Men's rowing
Representing New Zealand
British Empire Games
| Silver medal – second place | 1950 Auckland | Double sculls |

Joseph Conrad Schneider (11 September 1926 – 15 March 2013) was a New Zealand rower.

== Biography ==
Born on 11 September 1926, Schneider became a cabinet maker.

Both Schneider and Des Simonson were members of the Aramoho Rowing Club in Whanganui, where they were coached by the former world professional single scull champion, William Webb. Schneider was twice New Zealand champion in single sculls, first at the 1948 New Zealand Rowing Championships in Port Chalmers and then the 1950 championships in Wanganui. With Simonson, he won several national championships in double sculls.

At the 1950 British Empire Games in Auckland, Schneider (stroke) and Simonson (bow) won the silver medal in the men's double sculls. They finished with a time of 7:32, 10 seconds behind the winning Australian crew.

Schneider died in Whanganui on 15 March 2013, and his ashes were buried in Aramoho Cemetery.
