= Brenda Lawson =

New Zealand rower (born 1967)

Personal information
- Full name: Brenda Catherine Lawson
- Born: 30 October 1967 (age 59) Nelson, New Zealand
Medal record
Women's rowing
Representing New Zealand
World Rowing Championships
| Gold medal – first place | 1993 Račice | W2x |
| Gold medal – first place | 1994 Indianapolis | W2x |
| Bronze medal – third place | 1995 Tampere | W2x |

Brenda Catherine Lawson (born 30 October 1967) is a New Zealand rower. She was twice world champion in women's double sculls with Philippa Baker, and they were both inducted into the New Zealand Sports Hall of Fame in 2012.

Lawson was born in 1967 in Nelson; her mother is Val Wilson. She received her education at Nayland College and lived in Nelson until age 17, when she left to progress her rowing career.

Lawson rowed for clubs in Wairau, Hamilton, and Whanganui.

Along with Philippa Baker she finished 4th in the women's double sculls at the 1992 Summer Olympics. Lawson and Baker then went on to become double sculls world champions twice in a row, first in 1993 in Račice, Czech Republic, and then in 1994 in Indianapolis, USA. At the 1995 World Rowing Championships in Tampere, Finland, they came third. At the 1996 Summer Olympics, Lawson and Baker came sixth in the double sculls.

Lawson and Baker were named New Zealand team of the year at the 1994 Halberg Awards, and they also won the supreme award. In 2012, Baker and Lawson were inducted into the New Zealand Sports Hall of Fame, the first woman rowers to achieve this accolade. The Sports Hall of Fame citation reads:

It was undoubtedly the dogged determination of Philippa Baker, and later Baker and Brenda Lawson, that set the benchmark, along with the coach they sought out in Wanganui, Richard Tonks, that cemented the arrival and force to be reckoned with—New Zealand women's rowing—as we see it today. They helped build the next significant generation of female rowers; a generation who have and are becoming household names.

— New Zealand Sports Hall of Fame

Lawson and Baker competed again at the 2017 World Masters Games in Auckland, as part of the New Zealand women's eight.

Awards
| Preceded by Danyon Loader | Lonsdale Cup of the New Zealand Olympic Committee; 1993 | Succeeded by Stephen Petterson |
| Preceded by Eisenhower Trophy Team | Halberg Awards – Supreme Award; 1994 (with Philippa Baker) | Succeeded by Team New Zealand |
| Preceded by Eisenhower Trophy Team | New Zealand's Team of the Year; 1994 | Succeeded by Team New Zealand |
