= Sonia Waddell =

New Zealand athlete

Personal information
- Born: Sonia Scown; 19 February 1973 (age 53)
- Spouse: Rob Waddell (m. 1998)
- Relatives: Alistair Scown (father); Madeleine Waddell (daughter); Rebecca Scown (cousin)
Medal record
Representing New Zealand
Women's rowing
World Championships
Silver medal – second place	2001 Lucerne	Quadruple sculls
Women's track cycling
Para-cycling World Championships
Bronze medal – third place	2011 Montichiari	Time trial

Sonia Waddell (née Scown; born 19 February 1973) is a New Zealand athlete. She represented her country at a World Junior Championship in hurdles before becoming a rower, in which sport she was twice an Olympic competitor and where she won silver at a World Rowing Championship. She later competed as a cyclist and won medals at a UCI Para-cycling Track World Championship as a sighted guide.

== Private life ==
Waddell is the daughter of former All Black Alistair Scown and sister of rugby player Hayden Scown. In 1998, she married fellow rower Rob Waddell. Rower Rebecca Scown is her cousin.

== Sports career ==
=== Athletics ===
Waddell represented New Zealand in the 400 m hurdles at the 1990 World Junior Championships in Athletics in Plovdiv, Bulgaria.

=== Rowing ===
She first represented her country in rowing at the 1995 World Rowing Championships in Tampere, Finland, where she came ninth in the women's quadruple sculls. From 1997 onwards, she competed in the single sculls, and at the World Rowing Championships in 1997, 1998, and 1999, she placed tenth, tenth, and fifth, respectively. At the 2000 and 2004 Summer Olympics, she continued to compete in the single sculls, placing sixth and fifth, respectively.

She won a silver medal in the 2001 World Rowing Championships in the quadruple sculls, alongside Paula Twining and twins Caroline and Georgina Evers-Swindell. In the 2003 World Rowing Championships, she competed in the single sculls and came seventh.

=== Cycling ===
In 2011, she won the New Zealand Cycling Time Trial Championship.

At the 2011 UCI Para-cycling Track World Championships she took one gold and one bronze as a pilot, with teammate Jayne Parsons.
