= Alistair Scown =

- Born: Alistair Ian Scown; 21 October 1948 (age 78) Pātea, New Zealand
- Height: 1.85 m (6 ft 1 in)
- Weight: 95 kg (209 lb)
- School: Patea District High School
- Notable relatives: Sonia Waddell (daughter); Rob Waddell (son-in-law); Madeleine Waddell (granddaughter)

Rugby union career
- Position: Flanker
Provincial / State sides
Years	Team	Apps	(Points)
1968–1976	Taranaki	77	
International career
Years	Team	Apps	(Points)
1972	New Zealand	5	(4)

Alistair Ian Scown (born 21 October 1948) is a former New Zealand rugby union player. He has five caps as an All Black. All his test appearances were in 1972. Scown is known for being a player involved in what has been described as "the greatest try of them all" in a match between Barbarian FC and the All Blacks in 1973.

Scown's daughter Sonia represented New Zealand in rowing, and won bronze at the 2001 World Rowing Championships. Scown's son-in-law is Rob Waddell, who won a rowing gold at the 2000 Olympics.

Scown's son Hayden played rugby at a provincial level for Waikato between 1997 and 1999, playing 18 games and scoring 25 points.
