= Lake Horowhenua =

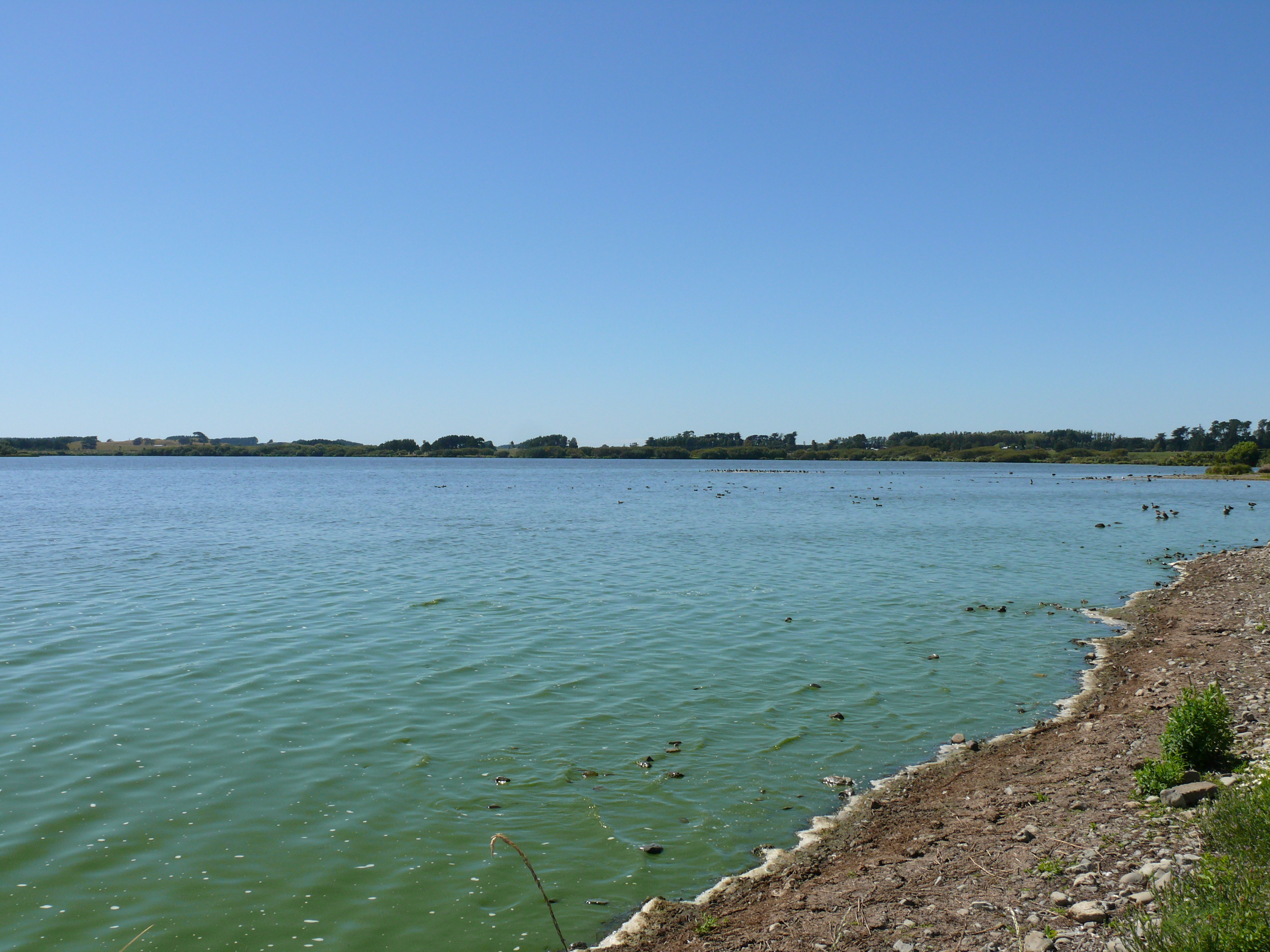
- Lake Horowhenua

- Location within North Island
- Interactive map of Lake Horowhenua
- Location: Horowhenua District, North Island
- Coordinates: 40.6100°S 175.2547°E
- Basin countries: New Zealand
- Surface area: 3.9 km^{2} (1.5 mi^{2})

Lake Horowhenua is in the Horowhenua District, an area of the southern Manawatū-Whanganui region in New Zealand's North Island. It covers an area of 3.9 square kilometres (1.5 mi^{2}).

The lake, also known as Punahau, is an aeolian lake that lies on a sandy plain 2 kilometres (1.2 mi) west of Levin and 5 kilometres (3 mi) from the coast of the Tasman Sea. It is a shallow lake, only some 2 metres (7 ft) deep, fed by various small streams, and is drained by the Hokio Stream.

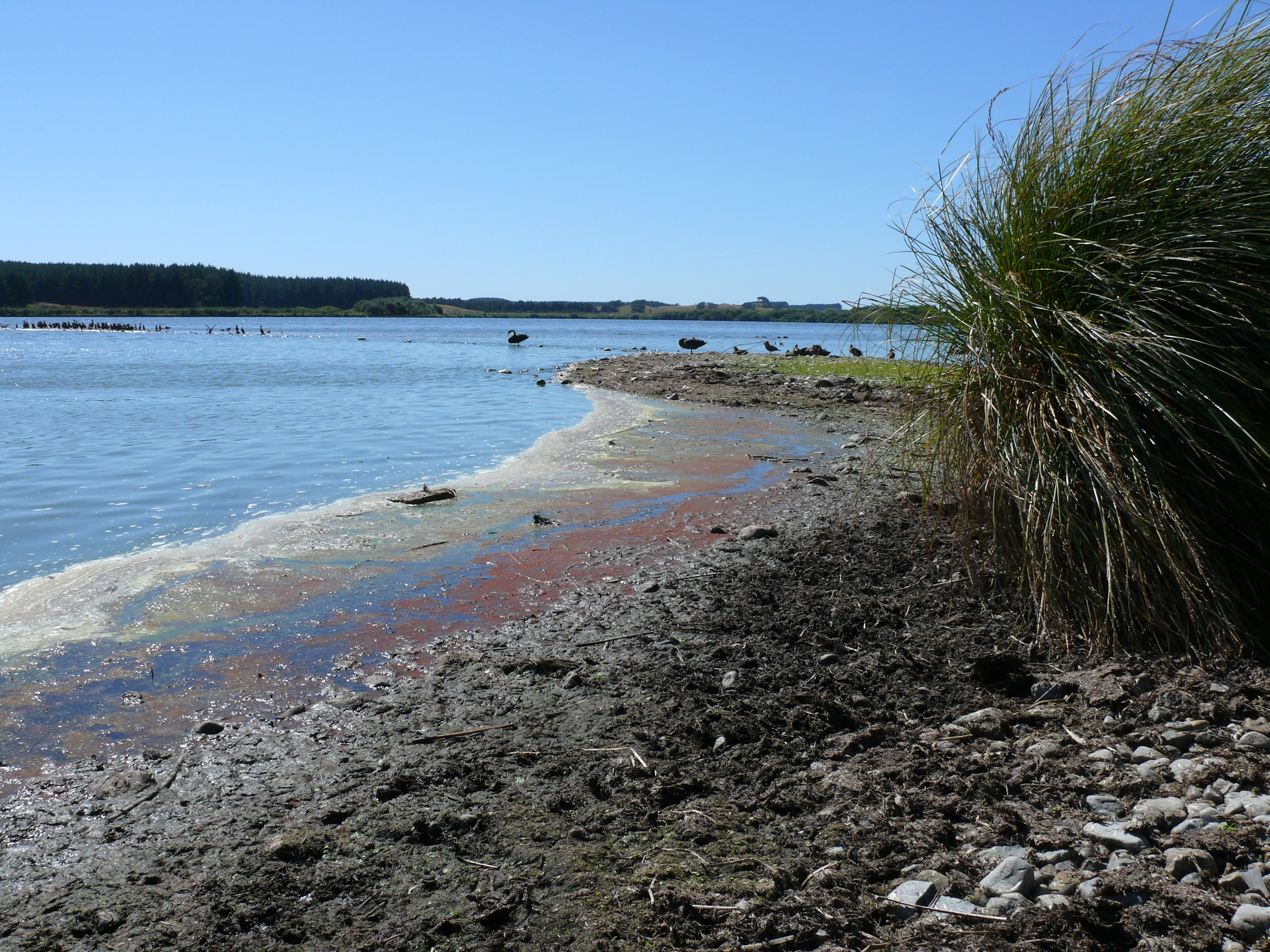
The shore of Lake Horowhenua

== History ==
The lake was once surrounded by podocarp forest as the centre of a rich wetland ecosystem. Today the trees are gone and the wetland has been substantially drained. The lake is owned by the Māori Muaūpoko iwi, who, with the help of the Horowhenua Lake Trust, are actively attempting to restore the wetland system (which also contains the smaller Lake Papaitonga) to its former state, as a conservation area.

In the 1820s the Muaūpoko were attacked by Te Rauparaha and the Ngāti Toa. Two island pā on the lake were destroyed.

== Water quality ==
Between 1952 and 1987 treated sewage from Levin was dumped into the lake. This has contributed significantly to the current eutrophic state of the lake. Between 2020 and 2030, the water of Lake Horowhenua is allowed to be maintained below some national bottom lines for water quality.
