= William Stevenson (New Zealand politician, born 1901) =

New Zealand politician (1901–1983)

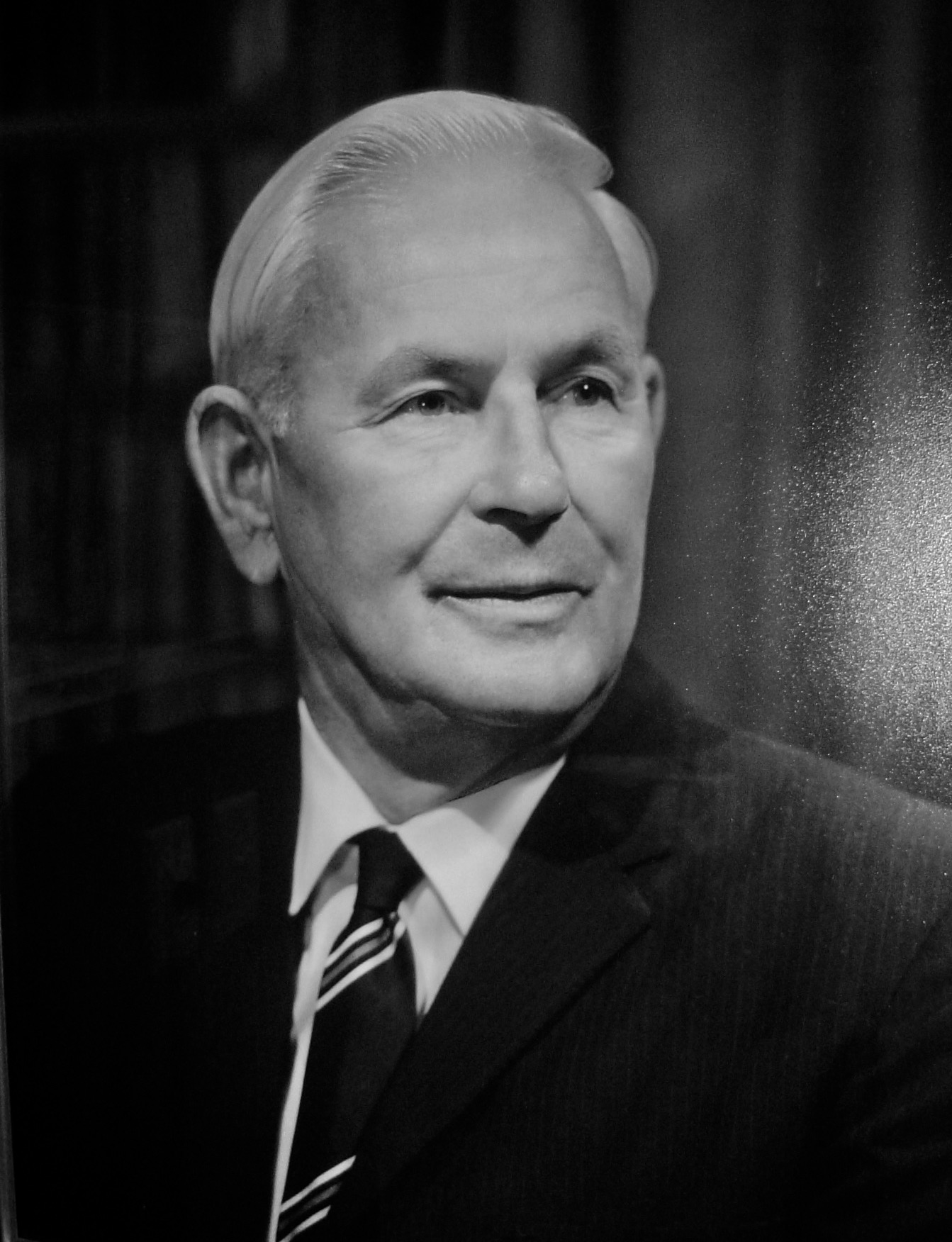
Stevenson (year unknown)

Sir William Alfred Stevenson KBE CStJ (19 May 1901 – 29 November 1983) was a New Zealand industrialist, philanthropist and local-body politician. He was also active in rowing, both as a competitor and official, and was a noted big-game fisherman.

== Biography ==
Stevenson was born in 1901, the son of Laura (née Paterson) and William Stevenson, who in 1913 founded the company that would grow into the Stevenson Group.

He was educated at Albany Primary School on Auckland's North Shore and began working as a carpenter for his father. In 1921 the business expanded into construction. Stevenson and his brother Jim took over after their father became ill, and later his sons Bill, Jack and Ross became involved, the company eventually becoming a major contracting firm that was registered as a company on 24 September 1931.

William Alfred Stevenson married Ruby Charlotte Ross (b.1897) in 1924. Their first son, William Alfred (Bill), was born in 1928, followed by John Kennedy (Jack, b.1929), and James Ross (Ross b.1932 in Palmerston North), before the family relocated to Karaka near Auckland around 1938. In 1939 Stevenson purchased a homestead and land in Cockle Bay, Howick. His daughter, Colleen Margaret Rose, was born in 1942.

He served as chairman of the Howick Town Board from 1944 to 1947, and was the second mayor of Howick, following its inauguration as a borough, from 1953 to 1962.

Stevenson won New Zealand single and double sculls rowing titles between 1923 and 1926. Later, he managed the rowing camp at Lake Karapiro for the 1950 British Empire Games, coached and managed the New Zealand rowing team to the 1954 British Empire and Commonwealth Games in Vancouver, and was manager of the New Zealand rowing team at the 1964 Summer Olympics in Tokyo.

A keen fisherman, Stevenson was a member of the Mercury Bay Game Fishing Club, and was the first person in the world to catch a tuna, marlin and shark each weighing more than 1,000 lb (450 kg). He held the Australasian record for a black marlin, caught off Cairns, with a weight of 1,231 lb (558 kg). A horse breeder and owner, Stevenson enjoyed success with his horse Jandell, whose wins included the 1973 Avondale Guineas, and the 1975 Queen Elizabeth Stakes at Randwick in Sydney, beating champion mare Leilani.

In 1958, Stevenson purchased the 13,800 ha (34,000 acres) Lochinver Station on the Rangitaiki Plains between Napier and Taupō, and transformed it into a productive farming operation with a carrying capacity of over 100,000 stock units. As a philanthropist, Stevenson supported many causes and charities, and was particularly interested in the medical area, donating to various hospitals, St. John Ambulance, and endowing chairs in orthopaedic surgery and ophthalmology and an associate professorship in plastic surgery at the University of Auckland.

In the 1954 New Year Honours, Stevenson was appointed an Officer of the Order of the British Empire for services to the community, and he was promoted to Knight Commander of the same order in the 1965 New Year Honours. He was appointed a Commander of the Order of St John in 1962, made an honorary member of the Royal Australasian College of Surgeons in 1975, and, in 1978, awarded an honorary DSc by the University of Auckland.

== Death and legacy ==
On 29 November 1983, Stevenson died at the age of 82. In 1995, he was posthumously inducted into the New Zealand Business Hall of Fame.
