= Philippa Baker-Hogan =

New Zealand rower (born 1963)

Philippa Baker MBE
Personal information
- Full name: Philippa June Baker-Hogan
- Born: Philippa June Baker; 12 June 1963 (age 63) Kaiapoi, New Zealand
- Occupation: radiographer
Medal record
Women's rowing
Representing New Zealand
Commonwealth Games
Silver medal – second place	1986 Edinburgh	LW1x
World Championships
Gold medal – first place	1991 Vienna	LW1x
Gold medal – first place	1993 Račice	W2x
Gold medal – first place	1994 Indianapolis	W2x
Silver medal – second place	1989 Bled	LW2x
Bronze medal – third place	1995 Tampere	W2x

Philippa June Baker-Hogan MBE (née Baker; born 12 June 1963) is a New Zealand politician and retired Olympic rower.

Baker was the first New Zealand woman to win a gold medal at World Rowing Championships and won gold at world championships on two more occasions. She represented New Zealand at the Olympics in 1992 and 1996, and won the Supreme Award at the annual Halberg Awards in 1991 and 1994. In 2012, she and fellow double sculler Brenda Lawson were inducted into the New Zealand Sports Hall of Fame.

Since 2004, Baker has had a career in community governance and local politics. A member of the New Zealand Labour Party, she was a member of the Whanganui District Health Board from 2004 to 2022 and a councillor on the Whanganui District Council since 2006.

== Early life and family ==
Baker was born in Kaiapoi in 1963. Baker is one of eight children. Her siblings include Erin Baker (New Zealand triathlete) and Kathy and Maureen who were both national champions in swimming and aerobics.

Baker trained as a radiographer. She is married to the osteopath Shaun Hogan and manages his practice in Whanganui. Baker and Hogan met as he was one of the team doctors for the Union Boat Club. They have two children.

== Sporting career ==
Philippa Baker was initially a triathlete before she switched to rowing. She initially rowed for Canterbury before changing to Cambridge, and took her inspiration from Stephanie Foster, the first New Zealand woman to win a medal at a rowing world championship. In 1992, her coach took up a job with the Swiss rowing team. Baker decided on Dick Tonks as her new coach and thus, in 1993, she moved to Wanganui to join the Union Boat Club. Baker has won a total of 19 or 21 national rowing titles during her career (sources differ). In the 1987–88 season, she was the first rower to win both the lightweight and premier open single sculls title; it was to be 29 years before the achievement was repeated by Zoe McBride in 2017.

Baker competed in the 1986 Commonwealth Games in Edinburgh, Scotland, where she won silver in the lightweight women's single sculls. Later in the same month at the 1986 World Rowing Championships, she came fourth in the same boat. At subsequent world championships in 1987 and 1988, she came fifth and fourth, respectively. At the 1989 World Rowing Championships, she competed in the lightweight women's double sculls, partnering with Linda de Jong as stroke, and won silver.

At the 1991 World Rowing Championships, Baker returned to the lightweight women's single sculls and won gold, the first woman to win gold for New Zealand at World Rowing Championships. Along with Brenda Lawson she finished fourth in the women's double sculls at the 1992 Summer Olympics in Barcelona. At the 1993 and 1994 World Rowing Championships, Baker and Lawson won gold in the double sculls. The duo again competed at the 1995 World Rowing Championships in Tampere, Finland and won a bronze medal. At the 1996 Summer Olympics in the United States, they qualified for the A final but came sixth, i.e. last.

=== Awards ===
Baker was the Waikato sports person of the year in 1989 and 1991; at the time, she was based in Cambridge. For her 1991 gold medal, she won the 1991 supreme award at the Halberg Awards, and she was named New Zealand sportswoman of the year. In the 1993 New Year Honours, both Baker and her sister Erin were appointed Members of the Order of the British Empire, for services to rowing and as a triathlete, respectively. Baker was the Wanganui sports person of the year in 1993 and 1994. Baker and Lawson were named New Zealand team of the year at the 1994 Halberg Awards, and they also won the supreme award. In 2012, Baker and Lawson were inducted into the New Zealand Sports Hall of Fame, the first woman rowers to achieve this accolade. The Sports Hall of Fame citation reads:

It was undoubtedly the dogged determination of Philippa Baker, and later Baker and Brenda Lawson, that set the benchmark, along with the coach they sought out in Wanganui, Richard Tonks, that cemented the arrival and force to be reckoned with—New Zealand women's rowing—as we see it today. They helped build the next significant generation of female rowers; a generation who have and are becoming household names.

— New Zealand Sports Hall of Fame

== Political career ==
Under her married name, Philippa Baker-Hogan was elected to the Whanganui District Health Board (Whanganui DHB) at the 2004 local elections. She was re-elected to the DHB five more times, with her final election being in 2019. Since winning a 2006 by-election, Baker-Hogan has been a member of the Whanganui District Council. Initially a representative of the Aramoho ward, Baker-Hogan has latterly been a district-wide councillor. Following the 2022 local elections, she is in her seventh term.

At the beginning of her career, Baker-Hogan was a supporter of the then-mayor, Michael Laws, and stood on his Wanganui Vision ticket. After Laws announced his retirement from the mayoralty at the 2010 local elections, Baker-Hogan was one of the five mayoral candidates. She came a distant fourth in the mayoral race, but was re-elected to the council and DHB.

As a district councillor, she caused controversy in 2011 with her comments over Palmerston North's bid when Whanganui was eliminated from the short-list for the proposed New Zealand Cycling Centre of Excellence; in the end, Palmerston North missed out, too, and what has become known as the Avantidrome was built in Cambridge.

Baker-Hogan is again standing for re-election as a councillor in the 2025 local elections.

Baker-Hogan is a former trustee (from 2009) and chair (from 2013) of the Whanganui Community Foundation. She sought the Labour Party candidacy in the Whanganui electorate for the 2017 general election, but lost to Steph Lewis.

Awards
Preceded by Peter Blake	Halberg Awards – Supreme Award; 1991; 1994 (with Brenda Lawson)	Succeeded by Annelise Coberger
Preceded by Eisenhower Trophy Team	Halberg Awards – Supreme Award; 1991; 1994 (with Brenda Lawson)	Succeeded by Team New Zealand
Preceded by Karen Holliday	New Zealand's Sportswoman of the Year; 1991	Succeeded by Annelise Coberger
Preceded by Eisenhower Trophy Team	New Zealand's Team of the Year; 1994	Succeeded by Team New Zealand
