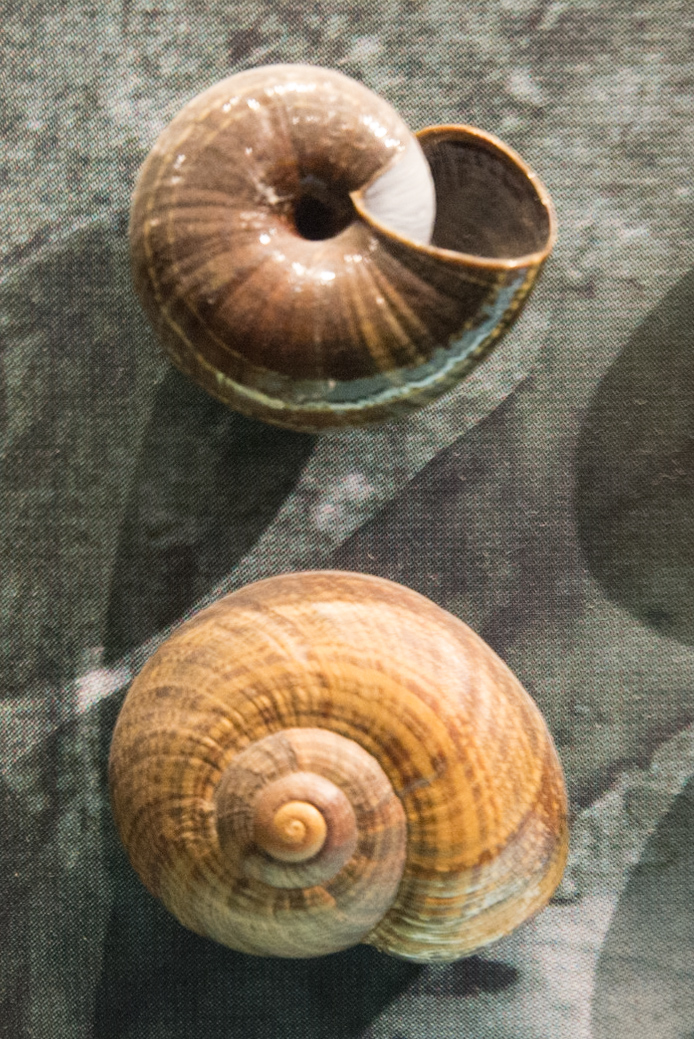
- Powelliphanta traversi otakia in Te Papa

Conservation status
- Data Deficient (IUCN 2.3)

Scientific classification
- Kingdom: Animalia
- Phylum: Mollusca
- Class: Gastropoda
- Order: Stylommatophora
- Family: Rhytididae
- Genus: Powelliphanta
- Species: P. traversi

Binomial name
- Powelliphanta traversi Powell, 1930

= Powelliphanta traversi =

Species of mollusc

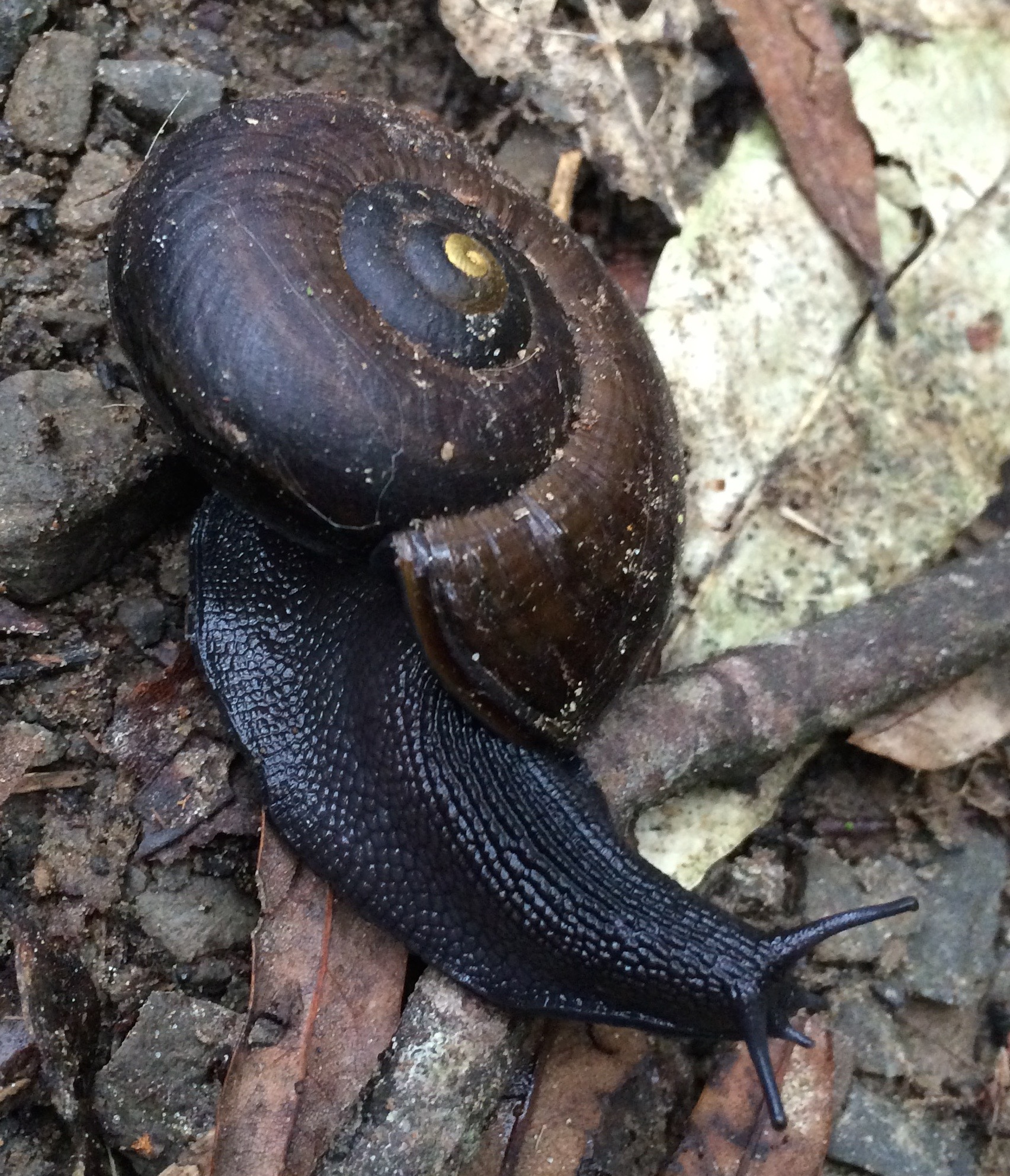
Powelliphanta traversi traversi at Lake Papaitonga

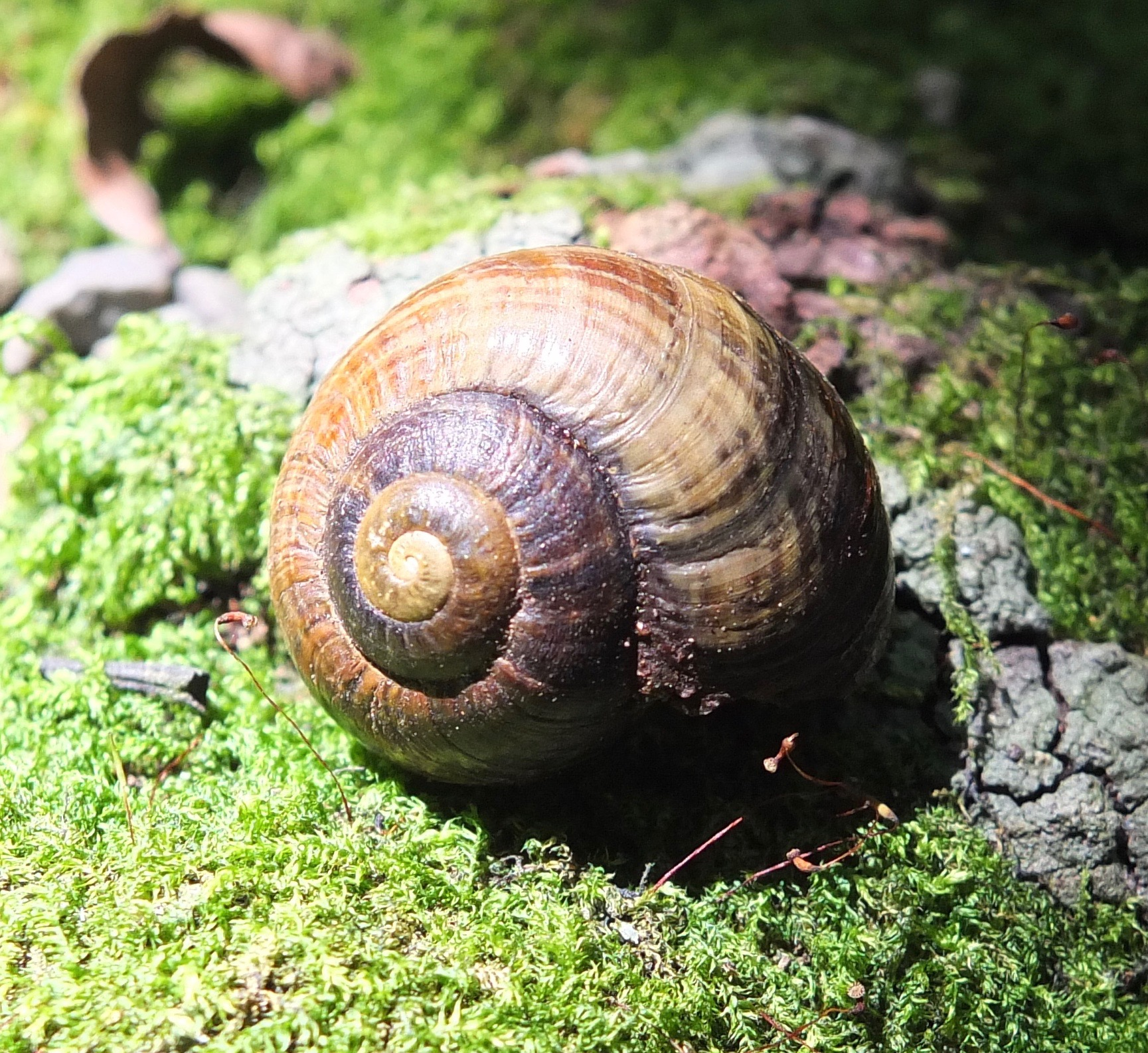
Powelliphanta traversi traversi in Prouse Bush, Levin, New Zealand

Powelliphanta traversi, known as Travers' land snail, is a species of large, carnivorous land snail, a terrestrial pulmonate gastropod mollusc in the family Rhytididae. This species is endemic to the North Island of New Zealand between Wellington and Lake Waikaremoana.

There are six subspecies, all of which are listed by the New Zealand Department of Conservation as threatened:

- Powelliphanta traversi florida Powell, 1946 – Nationally Endangered
- Powelliphanta traversi latizona Powell, 1949 – Nationally Endangered
- Powelliphanta traversi koputaroa Powell, 1946 – Nationally Endangered
- Powelliphanta traversi otakia Powell, 1946 – Nationally Critical
- Powelliphanta traversi tararuaensis Powell, 1938 – Nationally Endangered
- Powelliphanta traversi traversi Powell, 1930 – Nationally Endangered

The eggs are oval and seldom constant in dimensions 10 × 8.75 mm, 9.5 × 8.5 mm, 10 × 8 mm, 11 × 9 mm, 10.75 × 9 mm.

== Description ==
Powelliphanta traversi are smaller than other species of the same genus.

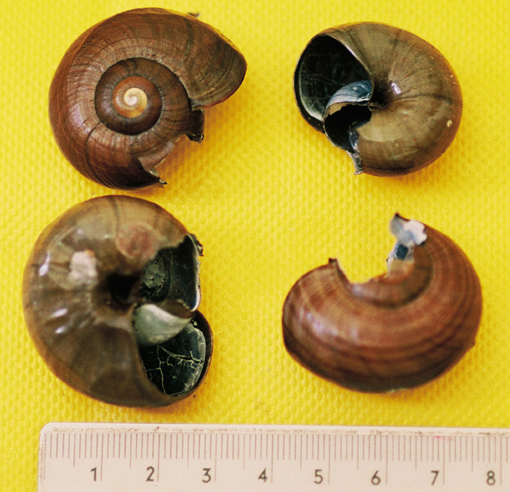
Shells of P. traversi that have been predated by brushtail possums

== See also ==
- List of non-marine molluscs of New Zealand
