= Linda de Jong =

New Zealand rower

Medal record
Women's rowing
Representing New Zealand
World Rowing Championships
Silver medal – second place	1989 Bled	LW2x

Linda de Jong is a former New Zealand rower.

At the 1989 World Rowing Championships at Bled, Yugoslavia, she won silver in the lightweight women's double sculls as stroke, partnering with Philippa Baker.
