= Percy Scown =

Australian rules footballer

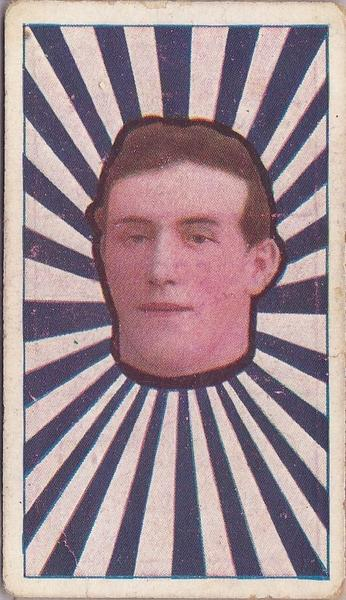
- Cigarette card of Scown in 1911

Personal information
- Full name: Percy Scown
- Born: 13 July 1883; Terang, Victoria
- Died: 6 July 1966 (aged 82); Bendigo, Victoria
- Original team: Cororooke
- Height: 178 cm (5 ft 10 in)
- Weight: 67 kg (148 lb)
- Position: Wing

Playing career^{1}
Years	Club	Games (Goals)
1906–14	Geelong	121 (2)
- ^{1} Playing statistics correct to the end of 1914.

Percy Scown (13 July 1883 – 6 July 1966) was an Australian rules footballer who played with Geelong in the Victorian Football League (VFL).
