= Don Rowlands =

New Zealand rower and businessman

Sir Don Rowlands KNZM CBE AM
Personal information
- Full name: Donald David Rowlands
- Born: 17 June 1926
- Died: 18 March 2015 (aged 88)
Medal record
Men's rowing
Representing New Zealand
British Empire Games
Gold medal – first place	1954 Vancouver	Single sculls
Silver medal – second place	1950 Auckland	Eight

Sir Donald David Rowlands KNZM CBE AM (17 June 1926 – 18 March 2015) was a New Zealand rower and businessman.

== Early life and family ==
Rowlands was born in 1926, the third child of Ruby Winifred (née Harrison) and Horace Edward Rowlands, and was raised in the small town of Ōwhango where his father was a sawmill manager. When aged five, Rowlands contracted rheumatic fever and had congested lungs, and missed a year's school as a result.

== Rowing ==
Rowlands rowed for the West End Rowing Club in Auckland, and won nine New Zealand national rowing titles in the single sculls, double sculls and eights between 1948 and 1957.

At the 1950 British Empire Games he won the silver medal as part of the men's eight alongside crew members Don Adam (cox), Kerry Ashby, Murray Ashby, Bruce Culpan, Thomas Engel, Grahame Jarratt, Edwin Smith and Bill Tinnock. At the next British Empire and Commonwealth Games in Vancouver, he won the gold medal in the men's single sculls.

He was included in the New Zealand team for the 1956 Summer Olympics in Melbourne but did not compete.

Rowlands served as a New Zealand rowing selector between 1960 and 1977, and managed the national rowing squads at the 1962 British Empire and Commonwealth Games in Perth and at the 1997 World Rowing Championships. He was chairman of the organising committee for the 1978 World Rowing Championships at Lake Karapiro and patron of the 2010 World Rowing Championships at the same venue.

Between 1974 and 1992, Rowlands was the New Zealand and Australian representative on the International Rowing Federation. He was the vice-patron and a life member of Rowing New Zealand.

== Business career ==
Rowlands began working for Fisher & Paykel as an assistant production engineer in 1948. He rose to become a director and chief executive of the company from 1978 to 2001. He also served as the chairman of Mainfreight from 1983, and became a director of HamiltonJet in 1990.

== Honours and awards ==
In the 1973 New Year Honours, Rowlands was appointed a Member of the Order of the British Empire, for services to rowing, and he was promoted to Commander of the same order in the 1979 Queen's Birthday Honours.

In the 2015 New Year Honours, shortly before his death, Rowlands was appointed a Knight Companion of the New Zealand Order of Merit for services to business and rowing. In the 2015 Australia Day Honours he was appointed an honorary Member of the Order of Australia for significant service to the sport of rowing.

Rowlands was named as a member of the New Zealand Olympic Order in 1991. He won the leadership award at the 2005 Halberg Awards. He was inducted into the New Zealand Sports Hall of Fame. In August 2014, he was inducted into the New Zealand Business Hall of Fame.

Awards
Preceded by Brian Lochore	Leadership Award; 2005	Succeeded by Tana Umaga
