= Hamilton Rowing Club =

New Zealand rowing club

Hamilton Rowing Club is based in Hamilton, New Zealand. It was formed in 1903.

Hamilton Rowing Club is the home club of Caroline Evers-Swindell and Georgina Evers-Swindell, 2004 Olympic champions in the double, and Fiona Patterson, 2004 World Champion in the U23 quad. Ben Waters, a medallist at the 1930 British Empire Games was a member of the club.

Other notable rowers include Byron "Arms" Arnold, the first and only Hamilton Rowing Club rower to achieve a sub 6-minute 2km ergometer time.
