= Caroline Evers-Swindell =

New Zealand rower

Caroline Evers-Swindell ONZM
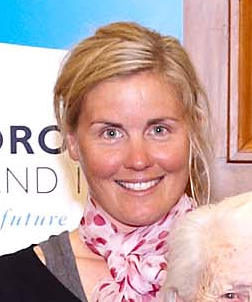
- Evers-Swindell in 2009

Personal information
- Full name: Caroline Frances Meyer
- Born: Caroline Frances Evers-Swindell; 10 October 1978 (age 48) Hastings, New Zealand
- Height: 178 cm (5 ft 10 in)
- Weight: 76 kg (168 lb)
- Spouse: Carl Meyer

Sport
- Sport: Rowing
- Club: Hamilton Rowing Club; Hawkes Bay Rowing Club
Medal record
Women's rowing
Representing New Zealand
Event	1st	2nd	3rd
Olympic Games	2	0	0
World Championships	3	3	1
Total	5	3	1
Olympic Games
Gold medal – first place	2004 Athens	Double sculls
Gold medal – first place	2008 Beijing	Double sculls
World Championships
Gold medal – first place	2002 Seville	Double sculls
Gold medal – first place	2003 Milan	Double sculls
Gold medal – first place	2005 Gifu	Double sculls
Silver medal – second place	2001 Lucerne	Double sculls
Silver medal – second place	2001 Lucerne	Quadruple sculls
Silver medal – second place	2007 Munich	Double sculls
Bronze medal – third place	2006 Eton	Double sculls

Caroline Frances Meyer ONZM (born 10 October 1978), better known under her maiden name Caroline Evers-Swindell, is a New Zealand former rower. She competed in the double sculls with her identical twin sister Georgina Evers-Swindell. In November 2005 she and her sister were named Rowing Female Crew of the Year by the International Rowing Federation (FISA), and in 2016 they became the first New Zealanders to be awarded the federation's highest award, the Thomas Keller Medal.

== Early life ==
Meyer was born in Hastings, New Zealand, on 10 October 1978. She grew up on an orchard, and attended a Steiner School.

== Career ==
The twins narrowly missed the qualification for the 2000 Summer Olympics in Sydney; in the crucial race in Lucerne where they had to come second in order to qualify, they came third. In 2001, she won silver at the World Championships in both the double and quadruple sculls. Together with her sister she won gold at both the 2002 and 2003 World Rowing Championships in the double sculls. She also won, again with her sister, the 2004 Olympic gold medal. Caroline was coached by Dick Tonks and represented Hamilton Rowing Club.

In the 2005 New Year Honours, she was made an Officer of the New Zealand Order of Merit, for services to rowing.

At the 2008 Summer Olympics in Beijing, she and her sister won gold medals in the women's double sculls, beating the German double by 1/100 of a second, 7:07.32 versus 7:07.33. This was the first time in history that the women's double scull title had successfully been defended. She and her sister announced their retirement from rowing in October 2008.

In December 2008, she and her sister won the Lonsdale Cup which is awarded by the New Zealand Olympic Committee to the athlete/s who make the most outstanding contribution to an Olympic sport. They previously won the cup in 2003.

== Personal life ==
In December 2009, Evers-Swindell married former Olympic rower Carl Meyer. She now styles herself Caroline Meyer.

== Sources ==
- Butcher, Margot (2010). Golden Girls: Celebrating New Zealand's six female Olympic gold medallists. Auckland, NZ: HarperSports/HarperCollins. pp. 84–105. ISBN 978-1-86950-892-0.

Awards
Preceded by Sarah Ulmer	Lonsdale Cup; 2003; 2008; With: Georgina Evers-Swindell	Succeeded by Sarah Ulmer
Preceded by Valerie Vili	Lonsdale Cup; 2003; 2008; With: Georgina Evers-Swindell	Succeeded by Mahé Drysdale
Preceded by Iztok Čop	Thomas Keller Medal; 2016; With: Georgina Evers-Swindell	Incumbent
