= List of New Zealand rowers at the Summer Olympics =

New Zealand rowers have competed at the Summer Olympics since the 1920 Summer Olympics in Antwerp, Belgium. Men have competed since the 1920 Antwerp Olympics and women have competed since the 1984 Los Angeles Olympics. 186 individuals have represented New Zealand in Olympic rowing (38 women and 148 men) and they have had 274 appearances (59 by women and 215 by men). Three athletes have won three medals (Simon Dickie, Mahé Drysdale, and Hamish Bond) and of those, Bond is the most successful with three gold medals.

With 29 Olympic medals including 14 gold medals, rowing is the country's most successful Olympic sport, followed by athletics with 26 medals including 10 gold medals.

== Participation ==
=== Early years without participation ===
In the early years of the modern Olympic Games, people from New Zealand participated but not on behalf of New Zealand. The country's earliest participant, Victor Lindberg at the 1900 Summer Olympics, was only officially recognised as New Zealand's first competitor in 2014. In 1908 and 1912, a total of six New Zealanders competed as part of a team from Australasia. But none of these early New Zealand competitors were rowers. After the 1916 Summer Olympics in Berlin, Germany, were cancelled due to World War I, New Zealand sent its first rower to the 1920 Summer Olympics in Antwerp, Belgium.

=== 1920 Summer Olympics ===
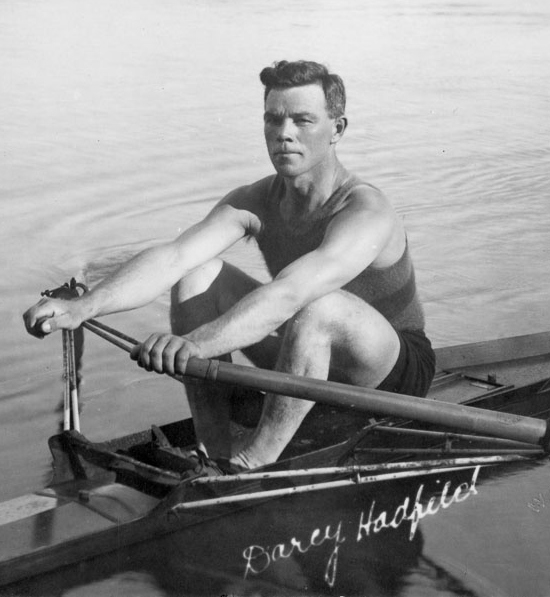
Darcy Hadfield in c. 1920; New Zealand's first Olympic rower and the country's first winner of an Olympic rowing medal

Darcy Hadfield was a dominant single scull rower of his time. He had won the 1919 Henley Peace Regatta "with ease", defeating the 1912 Olympic champion Wally Kinnear. Later in the same month, he won the single sculls at the Inter-Allied Games near Paris. The long journey from New Zealand by boat to Belgium saw him out of shape at the 1920 Summer Olympics, and he came third in the final race, winning bronze. He was New Zealand's only rower at the 1920 Summer Olympics. Hadfield was defeated in the semifinals of the single sculls by Jack Kelly Sr., the eventual gold medal winner, but took the bronze medal as the fastest losing semifinalist.

Athlete	Event	Quarterfinals		Semifinals		Final	
Athlete	Event	Result	Rank	Result	Rank	Result	Rank
Darcy Hadfield	Single sculls	8:05.0	1 Q	7:49.2	2	Did not race	3rd place, bronze medalist(s)

=== 1924 Summer Olympics ===
The New Zealand Olympic Council decided to send eight rowers to the 1924 Summer Olympics in Paris, France. The biggest challenge at the time was a lack of funds and in the end, the New Zealand Olympic team was made up of only four athletes, none of them rowers. Darcy Hadfield was a dominant single sculler at the time but he had become professional in 1922 and was thus no longer eligible to compete at the Olympics.

=== 1928 Summer Olympics ===
A New Zealand rowing eight was selected but was unable to travel to the games because of lack of funds. The chosen team consisted of Hubert McLean (Wellington), Crosby Morris (Canterbury), F. H. Brown (Canterbury), Clarrie Healey (Wanganui), Mick Brough (Otago), Vic Olsson (Marlborough), L. Brooker (Auckland), Bob Stiles (Canterbury), G. St. Clair (Auckland), and G. Duggan (Canterbury). The reserves were Glen Stiles (Canterbury) and N. Webber (Auckland).

=== 1932 Summer Olympics ===
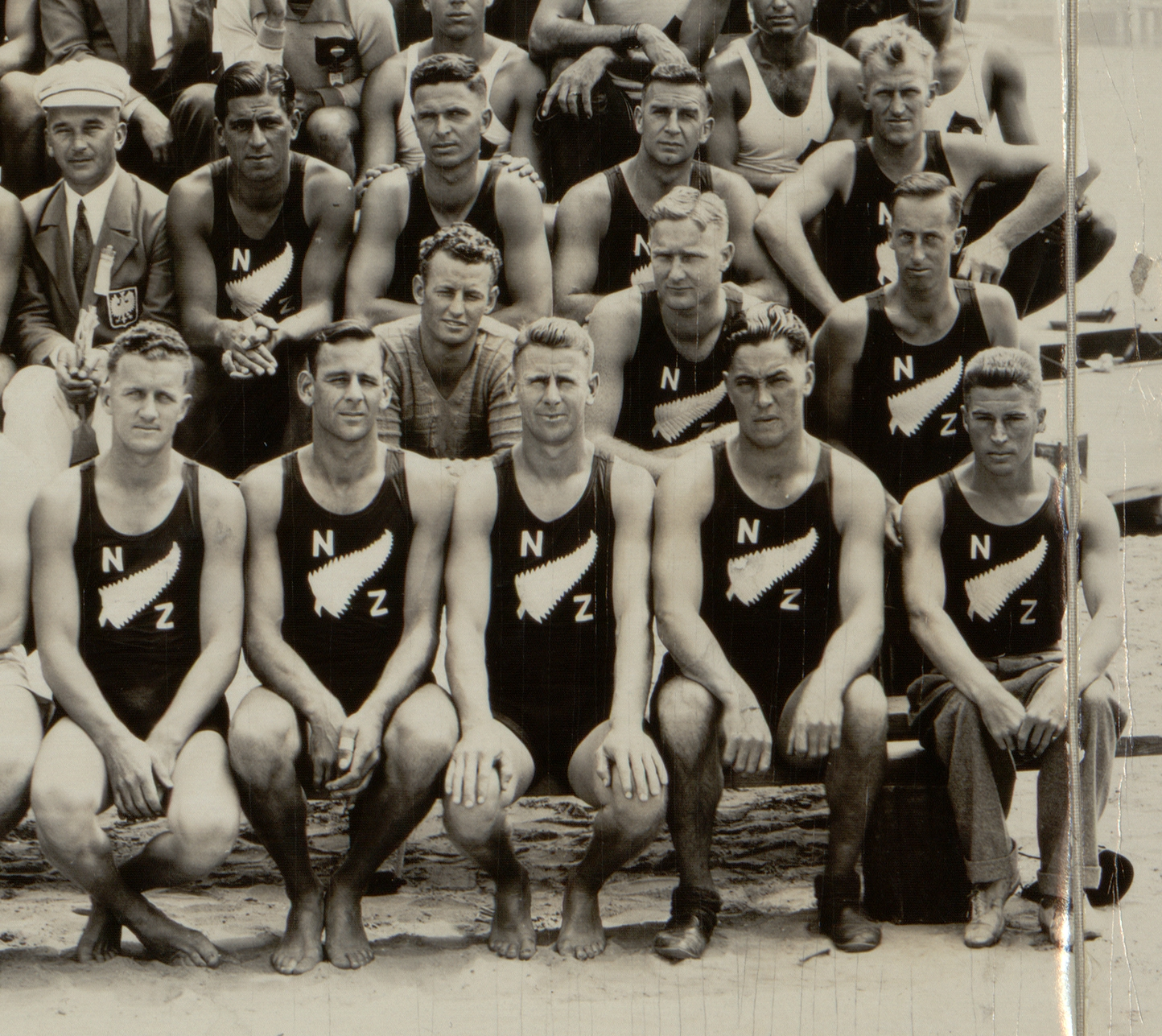
1932 Summer Olympics New Zealand rowers

In 1932, seven rowing competitions were held, and New Zealand entered three boats with a total of eleven rowers: a coxless pair, a coxed four, and an eight. Bob Stiles and Rangi Thompson won New Zealand's second rowing medal, a silver, in the coxless pair.

Athlete	Event	Heats		Repechage		Final	
Athlete	Event	Time	Rank	Time	Rank	Time	Rank
Bob Stiles; Rangi Thompson	Coxless pair	7:50.2	2 R	8:11.4	2 Q	8:02.4	2nd place, silver medalist(s)
Noel Pope; Somers Cox; Charles Saunders; John Solomon; Delmont Gullery (cox)	Coxed four	7:19.6	3 R	7:38.2	1 Q	7:32.4	4
George Cooke; Bert Sandos; Bob Stiles; Jack Macdonald; Lawrence Jackson; Rangi Thompson; Charles Saunders; John Solomon; Delmont Gullery (cox)	Eight	6:38.2	4 R	6:52.2	2	Did not advance	

=== 1936 Summer Olympics ===
In February 1936, the national rowing championships were held in Wellington. Even before the national championships, it was clear that no eight would be sent due to the cost involved and lack of previous international success. Following the regatta, it was decided that no rowers were up to sufficient form, and none were nominated for the Summer Olympics in Berlin.

=== Interlude ===
The 1940 and 1944 Summer Olympics were both cancelled due to World War II. While New Zealand sent a team of 17 athletes to the 1948 Summer Olympics in London, no rowers were included.

=== 1952 Summer Olympics ===
In 1952, seven rowing competitions were held, and New Zealand entered a single boat: a coxed four. The boat was eliminated in the repechage.

Athlete	Event	Heats		Repechage		Semi-finals		Semi-finals repechage		Final	
Athlete	Event	Time	Rank	Time	Rank	Time	Rank	Time	Rank	Time	Rank
Ted Johnson; John O'Brien; Kerry Ashby; Bill Tinnock; Colin Johnstone	Coxed four	7:25.2	4 R	7:07.3	2	Did not advance					

=== 1956 Summer Olympics ===
In 1956, New Zealand entered boats in three of the seven events, manned by eight rowers.

Athlete	Event	Heats		Repechage		Semi-finals		Final	
Athlete	Event	Time	Rank	Time	Rank	Time	Rank	Time	Rank
James Hill	Single sculls	7:30.1	3 R	8:29.9	1 SA/B	9:12.5	3	Did not advance	
Reg Douglas; Bob Parker	Coxless pair	7:32.6	1 QS	Bye		8:44.7	3	Did not advance	
Peter Lucas; Ray Laurent; Donald Gemmell; Allan Tong; Colin Johnstone	Coxed four	7:16.2	3 R	7:16.6	1 QS	8:30.7	4	Did not advance	

=== 1960 Summer Olympics ===
In 1960, seven rowing competitions were held, and New Zealand entered a single rower: James Hill competing in single sculls.

Athlete	Event	Heats		Repechage		Final	
Athlete	Event	Time	Rank	Time	Rank	Time	Rank
James Hill	Single sculls	7:19.64	1 FA	Bye		7:23.98	4

=== 1964 Summer Olympics ===
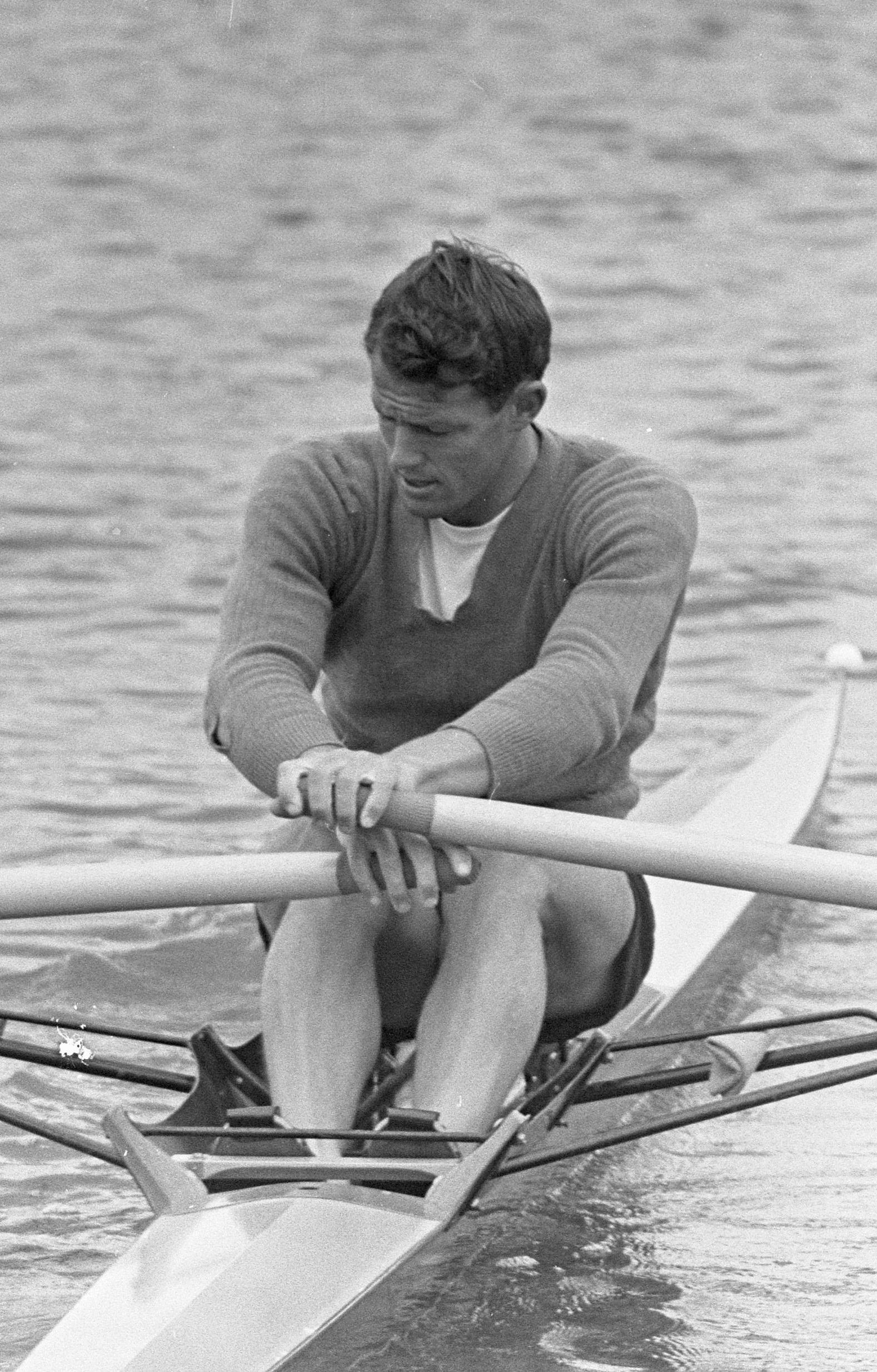
Murray Watkinson in 1964

In 1964, New Zealand entered boats in three of the seven events: men's single sculls, men's coxed four, and men's eight.

Athlete	Event	Heats		Repechage		Final	
Athlete	Event	Time	Rank	Time	Rank	Time	Rank
Murray Watkinson	Single sculls	7:49.01	2 R	7:45.28	1 FA	8:35.57	5
Darien Boswell; Alistair Dryden; Peter Masfen; Dudley Storey; Robert Page (cox)	Coxed four	6:50.81	3 R	7:09.26	2 FB	6:45.16	8
Mark Brownlee; Lex Clark; Peter Delaney; John Gibbons; George Paterson; Tony Popplewell; Raymond Skinner; Alan Webster; Doug Pulman (cox)	Eight	6:20.63	4 R	6:14.83	3 FB	6:07.59	11

=== 1968 Summer Olympics ===
In 1968, New Zealand qualified an eight and had a pool of four rowers and a cox as a travelling reserve. Preparations were held in Christchurch at Kerr's Reach on the Avon River. The reserve rowers were unhappy with the "spare parts" tag and felt that they were good enough to perhaps win a medal if put forward as a coxed four. The trainer, Rusty Robertson, commented about them:

the funniest looking crew you've ever seen

There were stern discussions with the New Zealand selectors. In a training run, the coxed four was leading the eight over the whole race. In the end, the reserve rowers got their way and New Zealand entered boats in two of the seven events: men's coxed four and men's eight. In the coxed four, the teams from East and West Germany were among the favourites; the United Team of Germany had won this event at the last Olympics, but that was the last appearance of the German United Team. The teams from the Soviet Union and Italy were also among the medal contenders. The East German team won their heat and semi-final in the fastest overall time, but the New Zealand team unexpectedly controlled the final and defeated the East Germans by over two seconds. This was New Zealand's third rowing medal, and its first gold medal in rowing. The medals were presented by IOC vice-president Konstantin Adrianow. The heat, semi-final and final were the only three races that the coxed four ever rowed.

New Zealand's eight was expected to win, and Wybo Veldman later recalled:

We were hot favourites but the wheels fell off. We should have won it, finished fourth, got nothing, a terrible experience.

In 1968, New Zealand's first golden era in rowing began. Under trainer Robertson, the era would last until the 1976 Summer Olympics. Both the 1968 coxed four and Robertson would later be inducted into the New Zealand Sports Hall of Fame.

Athlete	Event	Heats		Repechage		Semi-finals		Final	
Athlete	Event	Time	Rank	Time	Rank	Time	Rank	Time	Rank
Warren Cole; Ross Collinge; Dick Joyce; Dudley Storey; Simon Dickie (cox)	Coxed four	7:12.19	1 QS	Bye		6:48.65	1 FA	6:45.62	1st place, gold medalist(s)
Alan Webster; Wybo Veldman; Alistair Dryden; John Hunter; Mark Brownlee; John Gibbons; Tom Just; Gil Cawood; Robert Page (cox)	Coxed eight	6:05.62	1 FA	Bye		—N/a		6:10.43	4

=== 1972 Summer Olympics ===
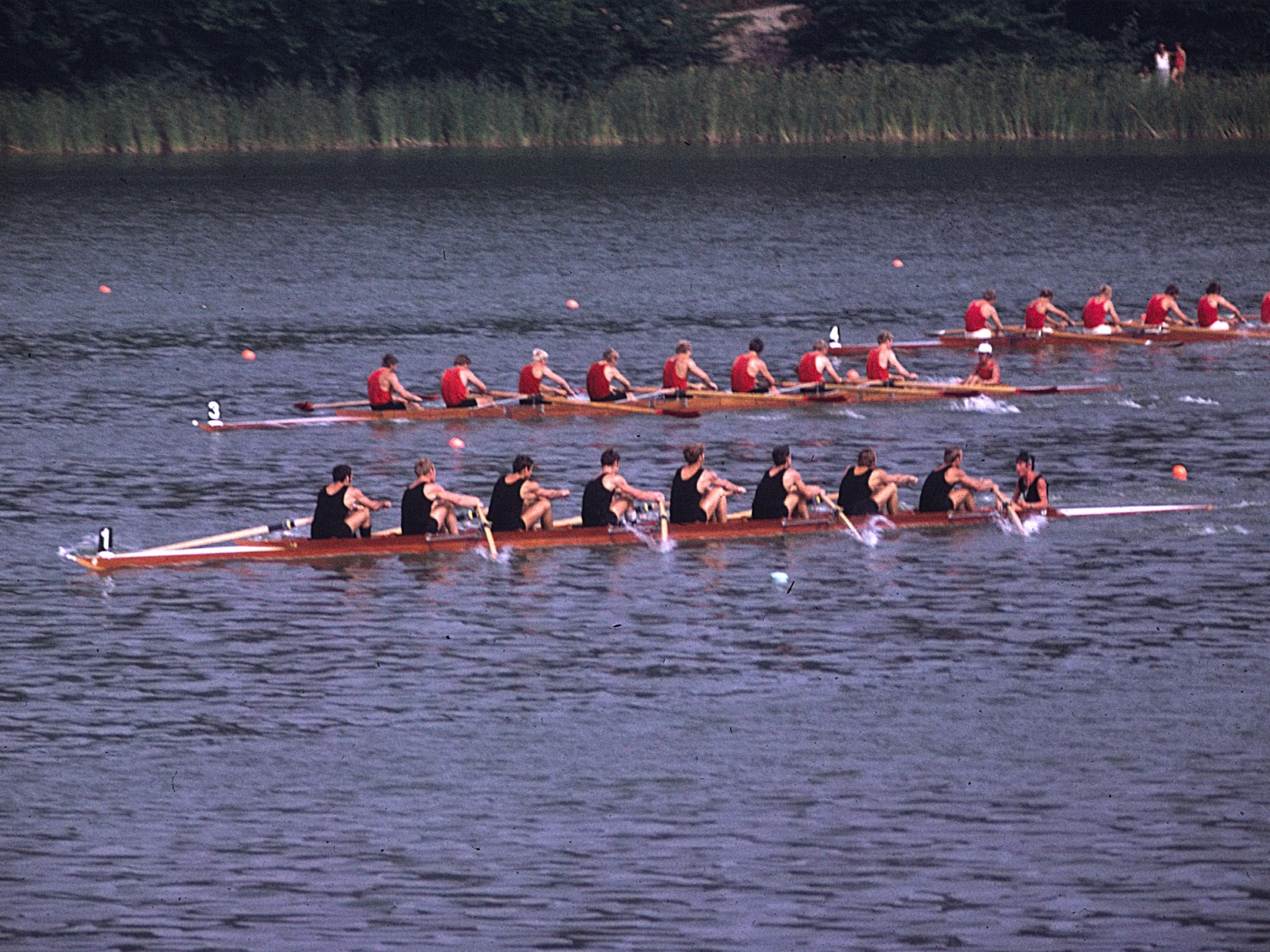
Semi-final at the 1971 European Rowing Championships; New Zealand in the foreground raced in identical composition at the 1972 Olympics and won gold

1972 was the last year that only men competed at the Olympic rowing events. New Zealand entered boats in four of the seven events at the Munich Games, and won medals in two of the competitions. The members of the gold medal winning 1972 New Zealand eight came from nine different clubs, which said a lot about Robertson's ability as a coach to blend individuals into a strong sum. The team would win Sportsman of the Year Awards in both 1971 and 1972. The crew of the eight standing on the victory dais overcome with emotion and "bawling like babies" is one of New Zealand's most memorable sporting moments. The medal ceremony for the eights was also the first time "God Defend New Zealand" played as New Zealand's national anthem instead of "God Save the Queen". Before and during the Olympic Games, the New Zealand rowing team stayed in the Bavarian village of Lenggries, where they were adopted by the locals as their own. When the 2007 World Rowing Championships were again held in Munich, Chris Nilsson—who was by then a rowing coach—arranged for the New Zealand team to stay at Lenggries once more, rekindling old friendships.

Athlete	Event	Heats		Repechage		Semifinals		Final	
Athlete	Event	Time	Rank	Time	Rank	Time	Rank	Time	Rank
Murray Watkinson	Single sculls	7:51.29	2 R	8:11.51	3 SA/B	8:30.88	5 FB	8:05.42	10
Dick Tonks; Dudley Storey; Ross Collinge; Noel Mills	Coxless four	6:47.27	1 SA/B	Bye		7:03.99	1 FA	6:25.64	2nd place, silver medalist(s)
Warren Cole; Chris Nilsson; John Clark; David Lindstrom; Peter Lindsay	Coxed four	6:51,76	3 SA/B	Bye		7:21.94	3 FA	6:42.55	6
Tony Hurt; Wybo Veldman; Dick Joyce; John Hunter; Lindsay Wilson; Joe Earl; Trevor Coker; Gary Robertson; Simon Dickie (cox)	Eight	6:06.19	1 R	Bye		6:28.40	2 FA	6:08.94	1st place, gold medalist(s)

=== 1976 Summer Olympics ===
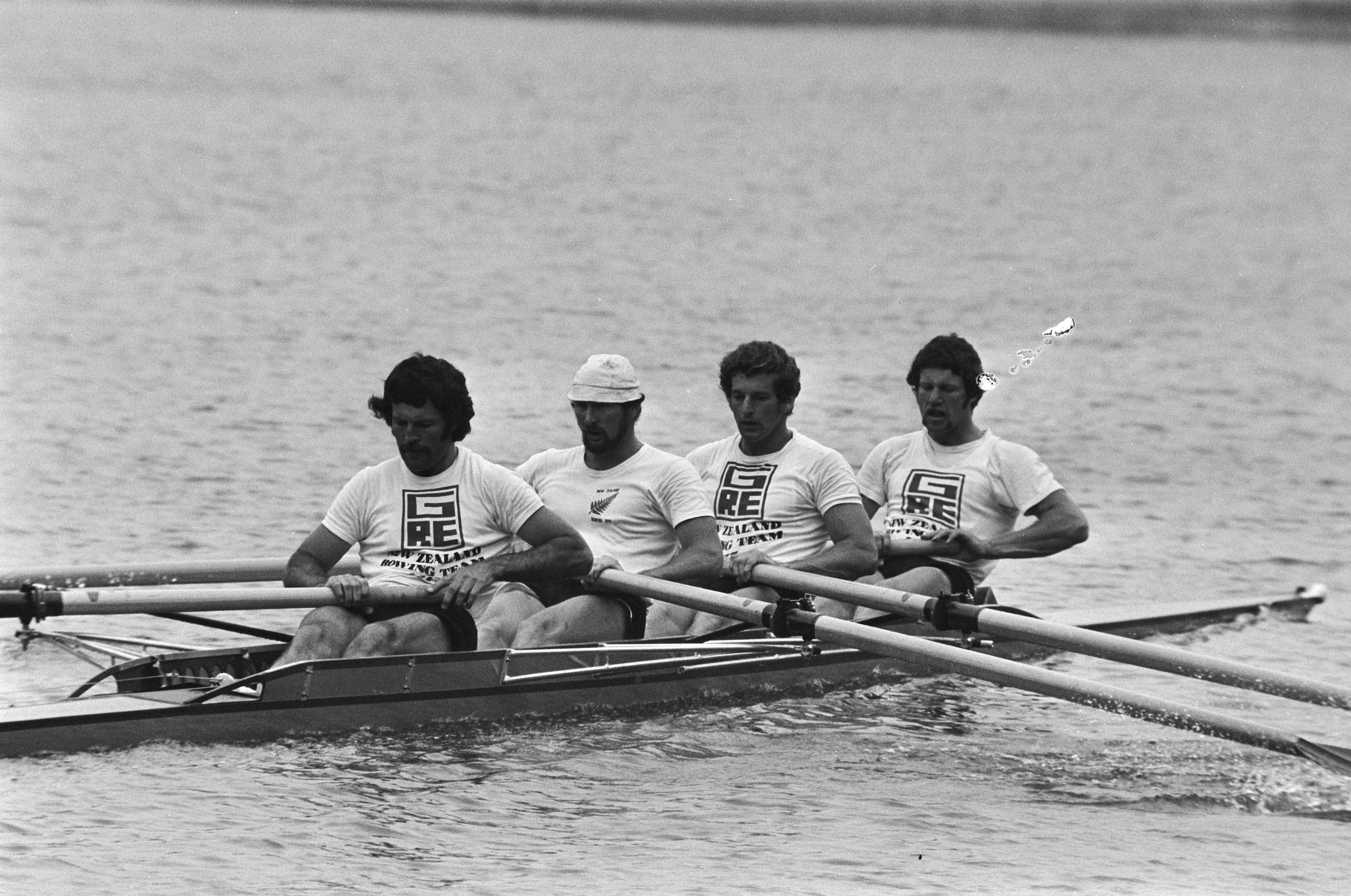
The coxless four at the 1977 World Rowing Championships, with Dave Rodger (having replaced Bob Murphy since the Olympics in the previous year), Des Lock, Ivan Sutherland, and David Lindstrom

Women were invited for the first time to compete in Olympic rowing events at the 1976 Summer Olympics in Montreal, Quebec, Canada, and 16 nations sent female competitors, but New Zealand was not one of those nations. New Zealand sent 18 men for three of the eight male rowing competitions. When the eight came "only" third, Robertson was dismissed as the national rowing coach; he went to Australia to continue his coaching career.

Athlete	Event	Heats		Repechage		Semifinals		Final	
Athlete	Event	Time	Rank	Time	Rank	Time	Rank	Time	Rank
Bob Murphy; Grant McAuley; Des Lock; David Lindstrom	Coxless four	6:06.40	3 SA/B	Bye		6:00.82	3 FA	6:43.23	4
Viv Haar; Danny Keane; Tim Logan; Ian Boserio; David Simmons (cox)	Coxed four	6:06.40	3 SA/B	Bye		6:00.82	3 FA	6:43.23	4
Ivan Sutherland; Trevor Coker; Peter Dignan; Lindsay Wilson; Joe Earl; Dave Rodger; Alec McLean; Tony Hurt; Simon Dickie (cox)	Eight	5:40.00	2 R	5:37.08	1 FA	—N/a		6:03.51	3rd place, bronze medalist(s)

=== 1980 Summer Olympics ===
1980 was the year of the Summer Olympics boycott led by the United States. The New Zealand Olympic and Commonwealth Games Association (NZOCGA) was initially determined to go ahead with New Zealand's participation and named an Olympic team of over 100 athletes, including a number of rowers, but individual athletes and the NZOCGA eventually yielded under the pressure exerted by the Third National Government of New Zealand under Robert Muldoon. Four New Zealand athletes went to Moscow as independents, but none of them were rowers. Those rowers who had been nominated for Moscow included Tony Brook, Alan Cotter, Stephen Donaldson, Duncan Holland, Peter Jansen, Robert Robinson, Anthony Russell.

=== 1984 Summer Olympics ===
In 1984, New Zealand's first female rower attended the Olympics: Stephanie Foster competed in the single sculls. There were again eight competitions for men, and New Zealand entered twenty-one rowers across five boats. The coxless four won a gold medal, while the coxed four won bronze. Due to the Eastern Bloc boycott and the absence of East Germany and the Soviet Union, New Zealand was the strong favourite in the eight event, but came a disappointing fourth. New Zealand sent 18 men for three of the eight male rowing competitions. At the time, Dudley Storey was the national coach.

Men

Athlete	Event	Heats		Repechage		Semifinals		Final	
Athlete	Event	Time	Rank	Time	Rank	Time	Rank	Time	Rank
Gary Reid	Single sculls	7:27.10	2 R	7:26.12	2 SA/B	7:34.15	5 FB	7:22.63	7
Geoff Horan; Allan Horan	Coxless pair	7:05.44	2 SA/B	Bye		7:02.89	4 FB	7:04.00	9
Les O'Connell; Shane O'Brien; Conrad Robertson; Keith Trask	Coxless four	6:08.41	1 FA	Bye		—N/a		6:03.48	1st place, gold medalist(s)
Kevin Lawton; Don Symon; Barrie Mabbott; Ross Tong; Brett Hollister (cox)	Coxed four	6:27.18	3 SA/B	?	1 FA	—N/a		6:23.68	3rd place, bronze medalist(s)
Nigel Atherfold; Dave Rodger; Roger White-Parsons; George Keys; Greg Johnston; Chris White; Andrew Stevenson; Mike Stanley; Andy Hay (cox)	Eight	5:48.19	1 FA	Bye		—N/a		5:44.14	4

Women

Athlete	Event	Heats		Repechage		Semi-final		Final	
Athlete	Event	Time	Rank	Time	Rank	Time	Rank	Time	Rank
Stephanie Foster	Single sculls	3:51.86	2 R	3:51.19	2 SA/B	4:02.29	4 FB	3:52.20	7

=== 1988 Summer Olympics ===
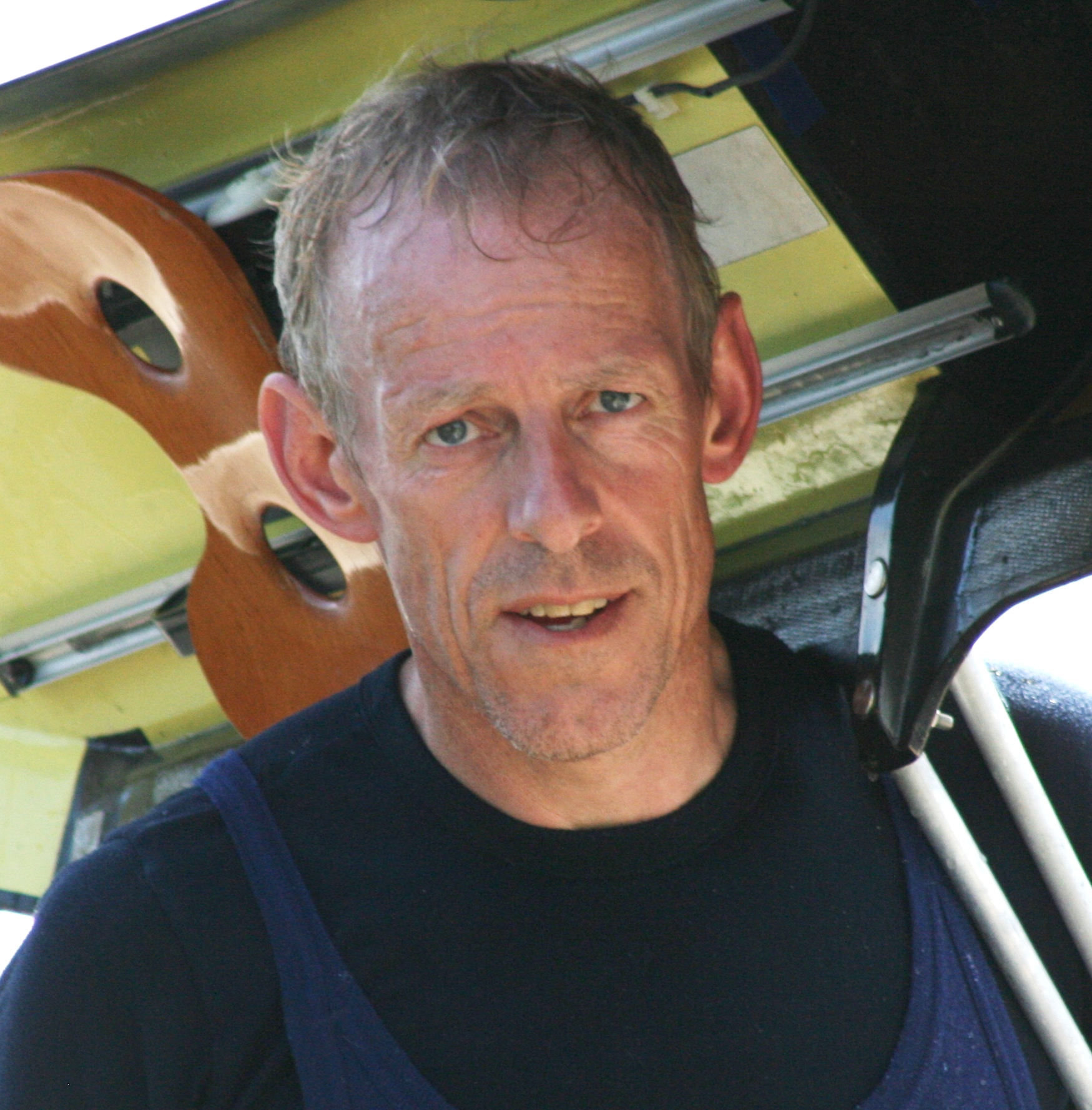
Eric Verdonk in 2009

New Zealand entered five boats across the fourteen boat classes; four of those for men and a coxless pair for the women. There were 15 New Zealand rowers in total, and three bronze medals were won, including the first by female rowing medal. Greg Johnston and Chris White were rowing in both the coxed pair and the coxed four, but once they qualified for the semi-finals, they decided to concentrate on the larger boat and did not race the coxed pair any longer.

Men

Athlete	Event	Heats		Repechage		Semifinals		Final	
Athlete	Event	Time	Rank	Time	Rank	Time	Rank	Time	Rank
Eric Verdonk	Single sculls	7:18.69	1 SA/B	Bye		7:11.98	3 FA	6:58.66	3rd place, bronze medalist(s)
Greg Johnston; Chris White; Andrew Bird (cox)	Coxed pair	7:22.32	3 SA/B	DNS					
Campbell Clayton-Greene; Geoff Cotter; Bill Coventry; Neil Gibson	Coxless four	6:06.75	2 SA/B	Bye		6:06.60	4 FB	6:04.74	7
George Keys; Ian Wright; Greg Johnston; Chris White; Andrew Bird (cox)	Coxed four	6:03.35	3 SA/B	Bye		6:10.41	3 FA	6:15.78	3rd place, bronze medalist(s)

Women

Athlete	Event	Heats		Repechage		Final	
Athlete	Event	Time	Rank	Time	Rank	Time	Rank
Nikki Payne; Lynley Hannen	Coxless pair	8:02.39	2 R	7:59.93	1 FA	7:35.68	3rd place, bronze medalist(s)

=== 1992 Summer Olympics ===
New Zealand qualified four boats for the 1992 Summer Olympics in Barcelona, Spain: men's single sculls, men's coxless four, men's coxed four, and women's double sculls. Twelve rowers competed for New Zealand, but there were no medals won in rowing in Barcelona.

Men

Athlete	Event	Heats		Repechage		Semifinals		Final	
Athlete	Event	Time	Rank	Time	Rank	Time	Rank	Time	Rank
Eric Verdonk	Single sculls	6:58.35	2 R	7:02.40	1 SA/B	6:56.79	3 FA	6:57.45	4
Scott Brownlee; Chris White; Pat Peoples; Campbell Clayton-Greene	Coxless four	6:03.10	2 SA/B	Bye		6:01.19	3 FA	6:02.13	6
Bill Coventry; Guy Melville; Toni Dunlop; Ian Wright; Carl Sheehan (cox)	Coxed four	6:32.61	5 R	6:25.32	4 FB	—N/a		6:15.66	11

Women

Athlete	Event	Heats		Repechage		Semifinals		Final	
Athlete	Event	Time	Rank	Time	Rank	Time	Rank	Time	Rank
Philippa Baker; Brenda Lawson	Double sculls	7:20.49	2 SA/B	Bye		7:01.07	2 FA	6:56.81	4

=== 1996 Summer Olympics ===
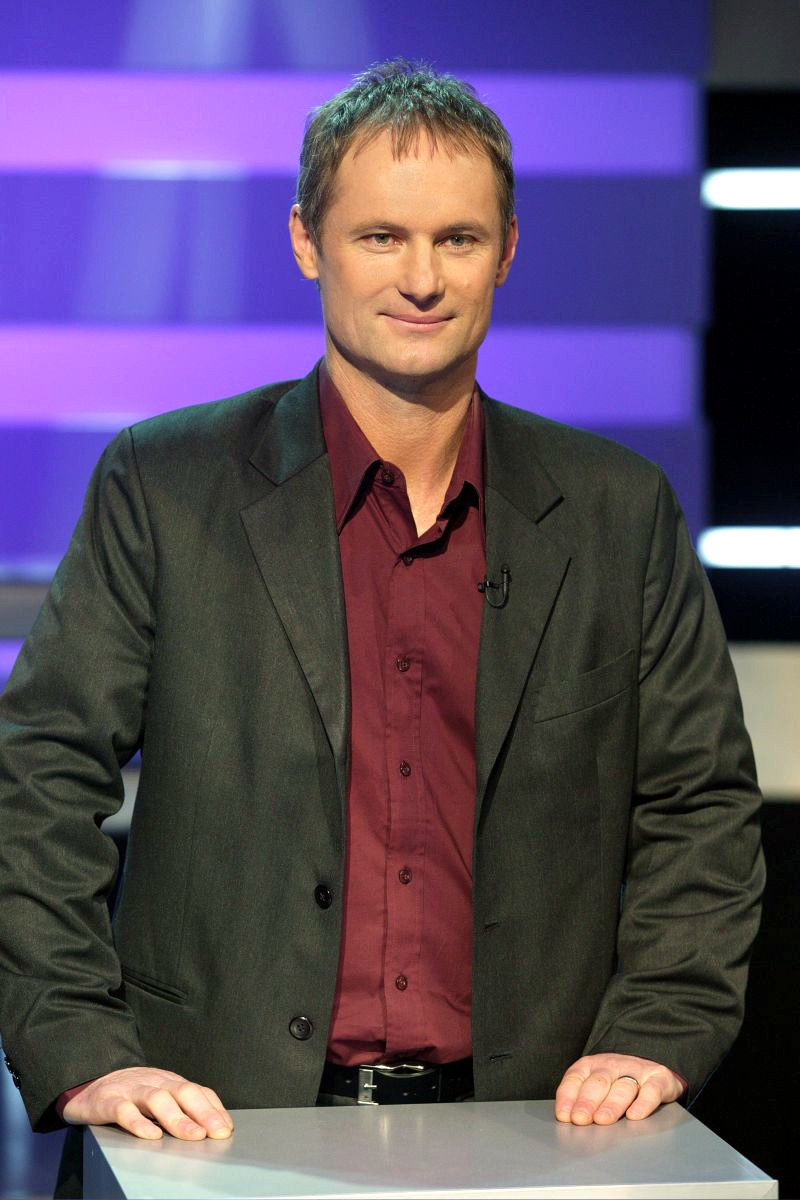
Rob Hamill in 2008

New Zealand qualified five boats for the 1996 Summer Olympics: men's single sculls, men's pair, men's coxless four, men's lightweight double sculls, and women's double sculls. Eleven rowers competed for New Zealand but like in 1992, there were no medals won in rowing.

Men

Athlete	Event	Heats		Repechage		Semifinals		Final	
Athlete	Event	Time	Rank	Time	Rank	Time	Rank	Time	Rank
Rob Waddell	Single sculls	7:48.69	4 R	7:42.87	1 SA/B	7:18.52	4 FB	6:49.55	7
Dave Schaper; Toni Dunlop	Coxless pair	6:42.15	3 R	7:04.40	3 SA/B	6:51.64	2 FA	6:29.24	5
Alastair Mackintosh; Ian Wright; Chris White; Scott Brownlee	Coxless four	6:30.03	4 R	6:35.58	4	Did not advance			
Rob Hamill; Mike Rodger	Lightweight double sculls	7:09.61	4 R	6:34.78	4	Did not advance			

Women

Athlete	Event	Heats		Repechage		Semifinals		Final	
Athlete	Event	Time	Rank	Time	Rank	Time	Rank	Time	Rank
Philippa Baker; Brenda Lawson	Double sculls	7:26.83	2 SA/B	Bye		7:15.57	2 FA	7:09.92	6

=== 2000 Summer Olympics ===
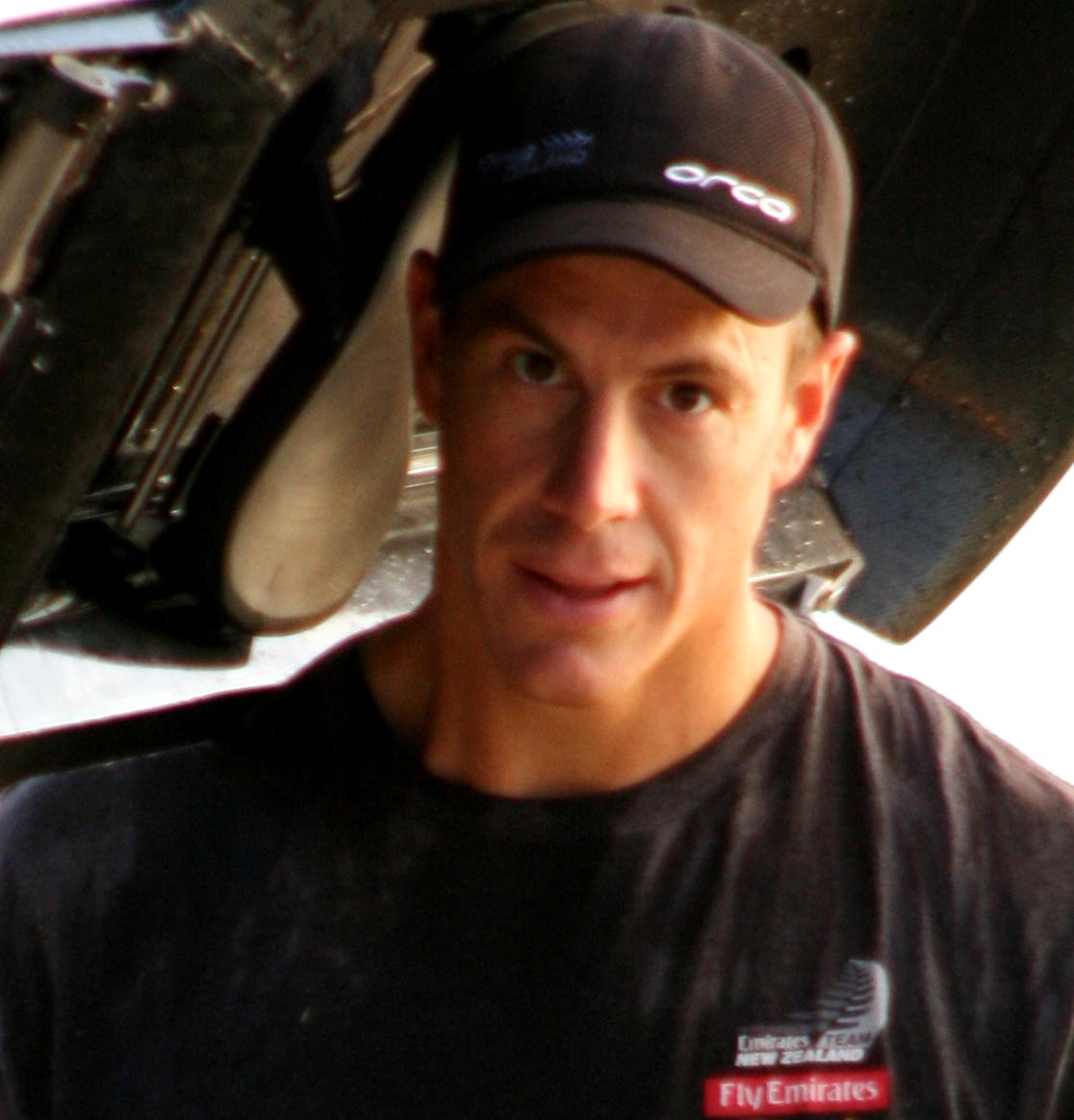
Rob Waddell in February 2008

New Zealand qualified three boats for the 2000 Summer Olympics in Sydney, Australia: men's single sculls, men's coxless four, and women's single sculls. Six rowers competed for New Zealand, and Rob Waddell—at his second appearance at Olympic Games—won a gold medal.

Men

Athlete	Event	Heats		Repechage		Semifinals		Final	
Athlete	Event	Time	Rank	Time	Rank	Time	Rank	Time	Rank
Rob Waddell	Single sculls	6:54.20	1 SA/B	Bye		6:58.01	1 FA	6:48.90	1st place, gold medalist(s)
Scott Brownlee; Toni Dunlop; Rob Hellstrom; Dave Schaper	Four	6:13.60	2 SA/B	Bye		6:05.33	3 FA	6:09.13	6

Women

Athlete	Event	Heats		Repechage		Semifinals		Final	
Athlete	Event	Time	Rank	Time	Rank	Time	Rank	Time	Rank
Sonia Waddell	Single sculls	7:40.18	1 SA/B	Bye		7:35.24	3 FA	7:43.71	6

=== 2004 Summer Olympics ===
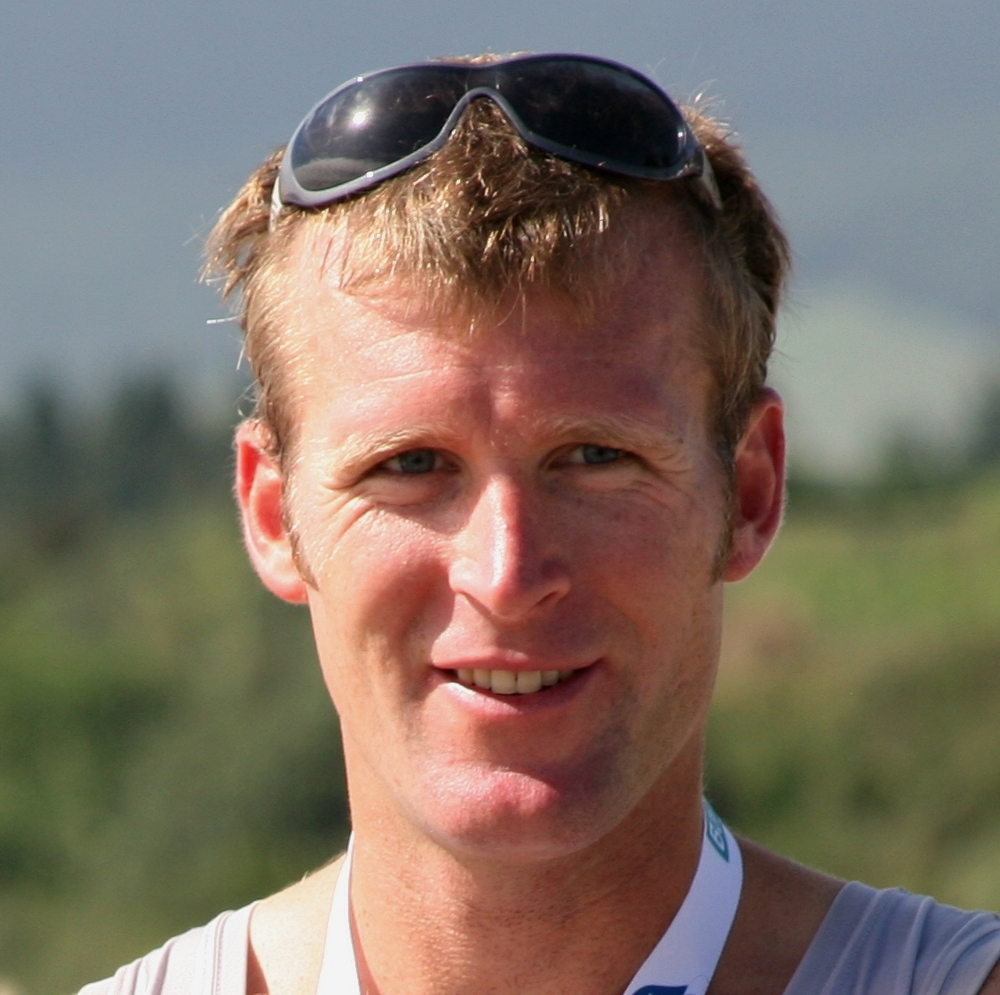
Drysdale in 2010

New Zealand rowers qualified five boats with 11 rowers; two boats for men's and three for women's races. Twin sisters Caroline and Georgina Evers-Swindell went into their double sculls as the favourites and did not disappoint; they beat the German team of Peggy Waleska and Britta Oppelt by 1 sec to win gold.

Men

Athlete	Event	Heats		Repechage		Semifinals		Final	
Athlete	Event	Time	Rank	Time	Rank	Time	Rank	Time	Rank
George Bridgewater; Nathan Twaddle	Pair	6:54.75	1 SA/B	Bye		6:24.49	3 FA	6:34.24	4
Mahé Drysdale; Donald Leach; Carl Meyer; Eric Murray	Four	6:22.91	2 SA/B	Bye		5:52.95	2 FA	6:15.47	4

Women

Athlete	Event	Heats		Repechage		Semifinals		Final	
Athlete	Event	Time	Rank	Time	Rank	Time	Rank	Time	Rank
Sonia Waddell	Single sculls	7:36.15	1 SA/B/C	Bye		7:42.00	3 FA	7:31.66	6
Nicky Coles; Juliette Haigh	Pair	9:37.53	5 R	7:11.00	2 FA	—N/a		7:23.52	6
Caroline Evers-Swindell; Georgina Evers-Swindell	Double sculls	7:25.57	1 FA	Bye		—N/a		7:01.79	1st place, gold medalist(s)

=== 2008 Summer Olympics ===
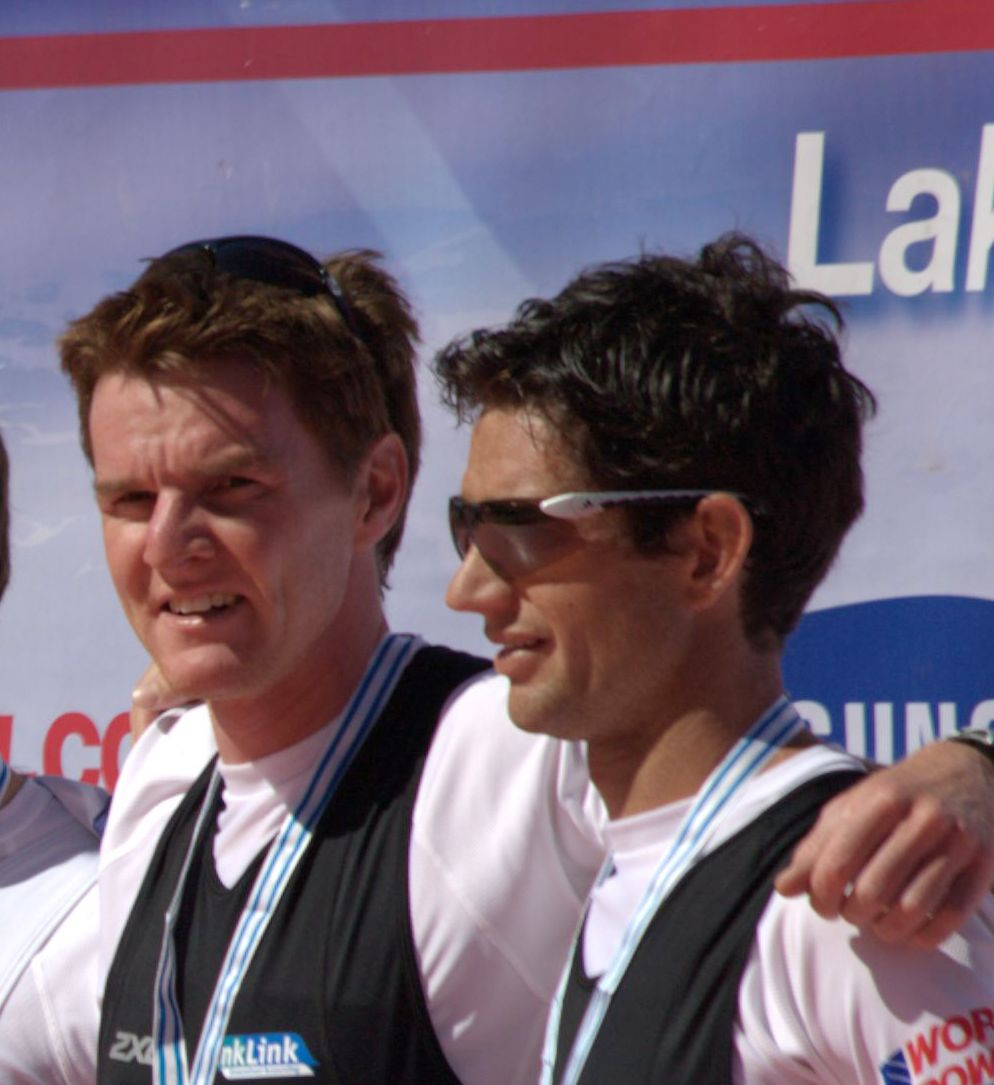
Taylor (left) and Uru in 2010

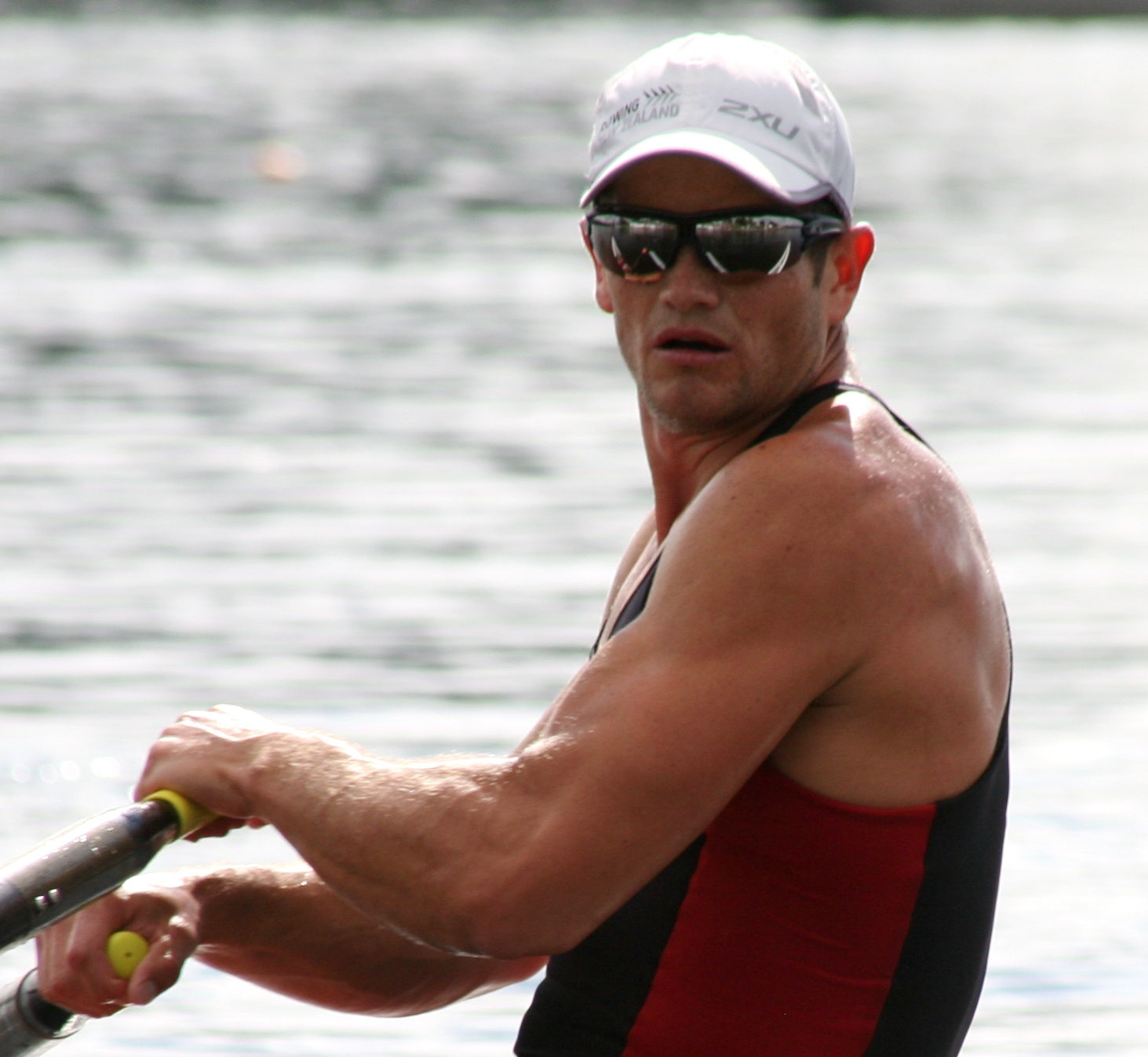
Nathan Cohen in 2012

New Zealand rowers qualified eight boats with 16 rowers; five boats for men's and three for women's races. Mahé Drysdale won his first Olympic medal (bronze) and the men's pair of George Bridgewater and Nathan Twaddle also won a bronze medal. But the lasting rowing memory from the Beijing Summer Games is the gold medal by the Evers-Swindell twins, who beat their German opponents by 0.01 sec. The twins have twice won the Lonsdale Cup (in 2003 and 2008), awarded by the New Zealand Olympic Committee for the most outstanding contribution to an Olympic or Commonwealth sport during the previous year. In 2016, the twins were awarded the Thomas Keller Medal, the highest honour available in world rowing.

Men

Athlete	Event	Heats		Repechage		Quarterfinals		Semifinals		Final	
Athlete	Event	Time	Rank	Time	Rank	Time	Rank	Time	Rank	Time	Rank
Mahé Drysdale	Single sculls	7:28.80	1 QF	—N/a		6:50.18	1 SA/B	7:05.57	3 FA	7:01.56	3rd place, bronze medalist(s)
George Bridgewater; Nathan Twaddle	Pair	6:41.65	1 SA/B	Bye		—N/a		6:36.05	2 FA	6:44.19	3rd place, bronze medalist(s)
Nathan Cohen; Rob Waddell	Double sculls	6:24.32	1 SA/B	Bye		—N/a		6:24.16	3 FA	6:30.79	4
Peter Taylor; Storm Uru	Lightweight double sculls	6:16.78	1 SA/B	Bye		—N/a		6:30.53	4 FB	6:27.14	7
Hamish Bond; James Dallinger; Carl Meyer; Eric Murray	Four	6:00.73	2 SA/B	Bye		—N/a		5:57.31	4 FB	6:06.30	7

Women

Athlete	Event	Heats		Repechage		Quarterfinals		Semifinals		Final	
Athlete	Event	Time	Rank	Time	Rank	Time	Rank	Time	Rank	Time	Rank
Emma Twigg	Single sculls	7:45.12	1 QF	—N/a		7:34.24	3 SA/B	7:38.09	4 FB	7:51.63	9
Nicky Coles; Juliette Haigh	Pair	7:31.45	2 R	7:32.64	1 FA	—N/a				7:28.80	5
Caroline Evers-Swindell; Georgina Evers-Swindell	Double sculls	7:03.92	1 FA	Bye		—N/a				7:07.32	1st place, gold medalist(s)

=== 2012 Summer Olympics ===
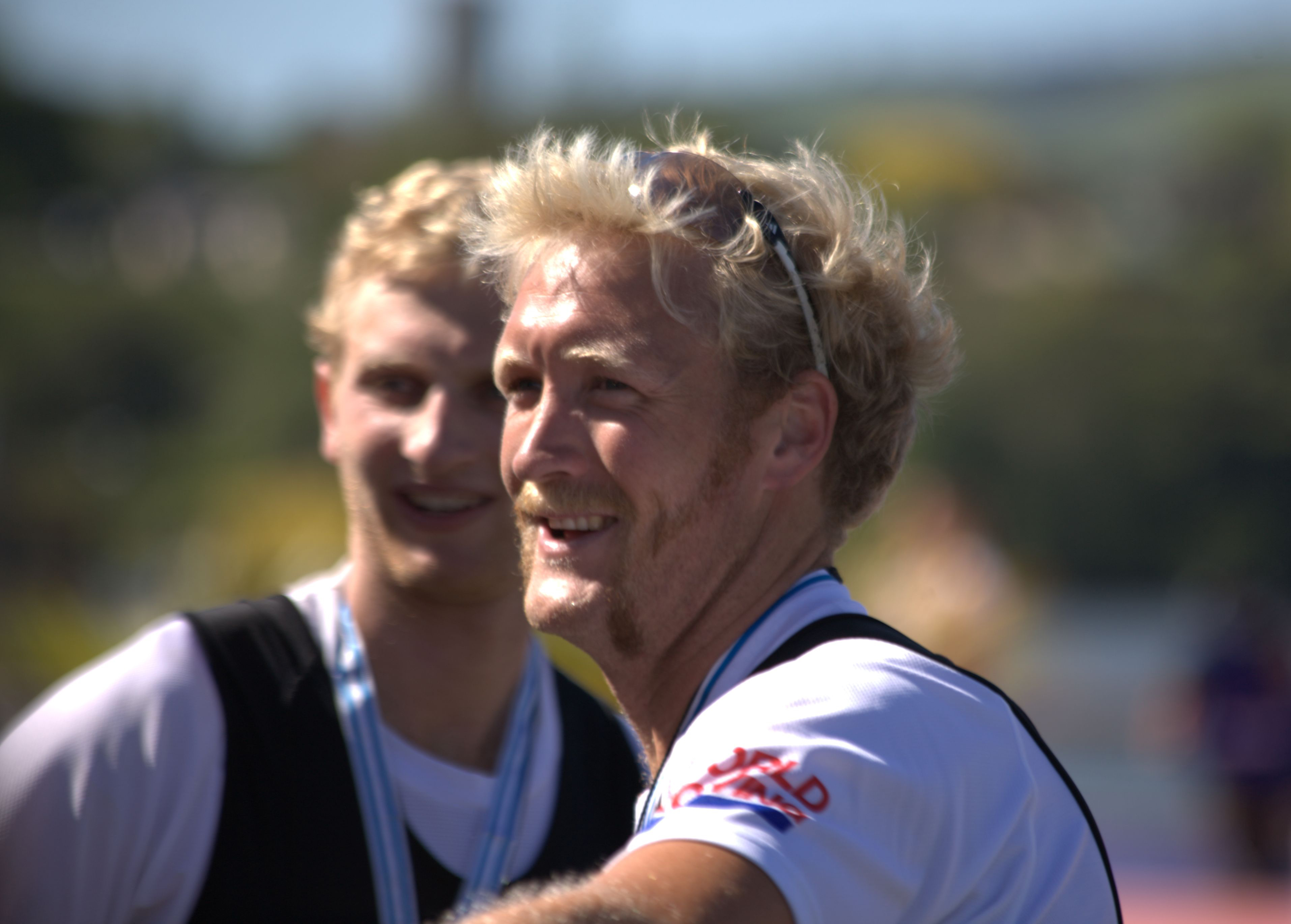
Bond (rear) and Murray won Olympic gold in the coxless pair in both 2012 and 2016

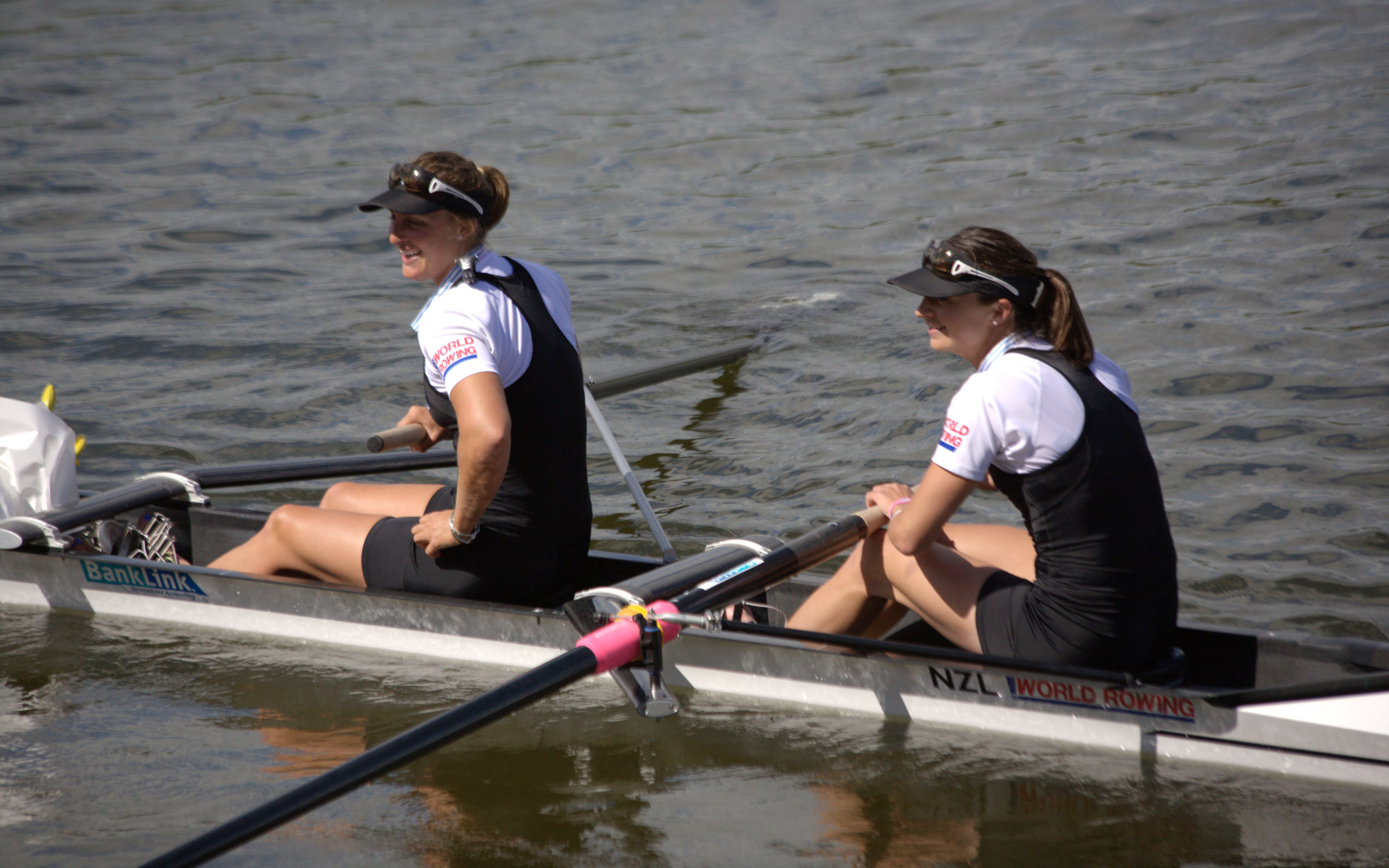
Haigh and Scown in 2010

New Zealand rowers had their most successful campaign to date at the 2012 Summer Olympics in Great Britain. Eleven boats with 26 rowers had qualified, and three gold and two bronze medals were won. The men won gold in the single sculls, double sculls, and pair, and bronze in the lightweight double sculls. The women won bronze in the pair. Hamish Bond later wrote that he watched Nathan Cohen and Joseph Sullivan in their final, and with 500 m to go, they were 3.5 sec down on the leaders and in fourth place; whilst they were the reigning world champions and had dominated the qualifying races, Bond was convinced that they had no chance of winning their final. But they had the most impressive sprint and won by half a length. It gave Bond confidence that he could win his race, too, and so he did (with Eric Murray) the following day.

Men

Athlete	Event	Heats		Repechage		Quarterfinals		Semifinals		Final	
Athlete	Event	Time	Rank	Time	Rank	Time	Rank	Time	Rank	Time	Rank
Mahé Drysdale	Single sculls	6:49.69	1 QF	Bye		6:54.86	1 SA/B	7:18.11	1 FA	6:57.82	1st place, gold medalist(s)
Hamish Bond; Eric Murray	Pair	6:08.50 WR	1 SA/B	Bye		—N/a		6:48.11	1 FA	6:16.65	1st place, gold medalist(s)
Nathan Cohen; Joseph Sullivan	Double sculls	6:11.30 OR	1 SA/B	Bye		—N/a		6:19.79	3 FA	6:31.67	1st place, gold medalist(s)
Peter Taylor; Storm Uru	Lightweight double sculls	6:37.02	2 SA/B	Bye		—N/a		6:36.71	3 FA	6:40.86	3rd place, bronze medalist(s)
Chris Harris; Sean O'Neill; Jade Uru; Tyson Williams	Four	5:51.84	4 R	6:03.66	2 SA/B	—N/a		6:06.36	4 FB	6:11.97	11
Michael Arms; Robbie Manson; John Storey; Matthew Trott	Quadruple sculls	5:41.62	4 R	5:43.82	1 SA/B	—N/a		6:10.95	4 FB	5:58.88	7

Women

Athlete	Event	Heats		Repechage		Quarterfinals		Semifinals		Final	
Athlete	Event	Time	Rank	Time	Rank	Time	Rank	Time	Rank	Time	Rank
Emma Twigg	Single sculls	7:40.24	4 QF	Bye		7:39.07	5 SA/B	7:46.71	3 FA	8:01.76	4
Juliette Haigh; Rebecca Scown	Pair	7:06.93	2 FA	Bye		—N/a				7:30.19	3rd place, bronze medalist(s)
Fiona Paterson; Anna Reymer	Double sculls	6:49.44	2 FA	Bye		—N/a				7:09.82	5
Louise Ayling; Julia Edward	Lightweight double sculls	7:02.78	3 R	7:21.29	2 SA/B	—N/a		7:15.06	5 FB	7:22.78	9
Fiona Bourke; Sarah Gray; Eve Macfarlane; Louise Trappitt	Quadruple sculls	6:20.22	3 R	6:48.71	6 FB	—N/a				6:56.46	7

=== 2016 Summer Olympics ===
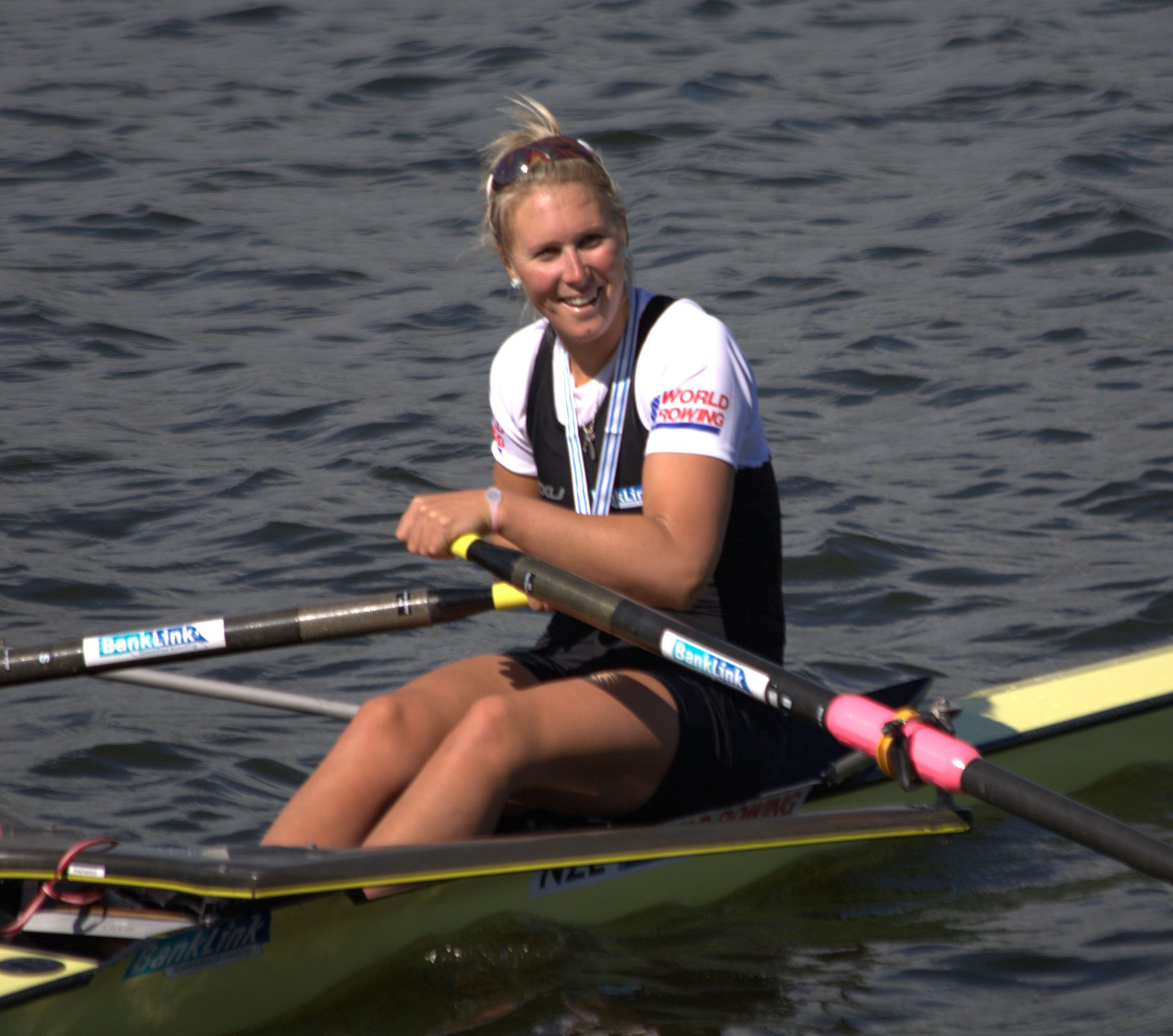
Twigg in 2010

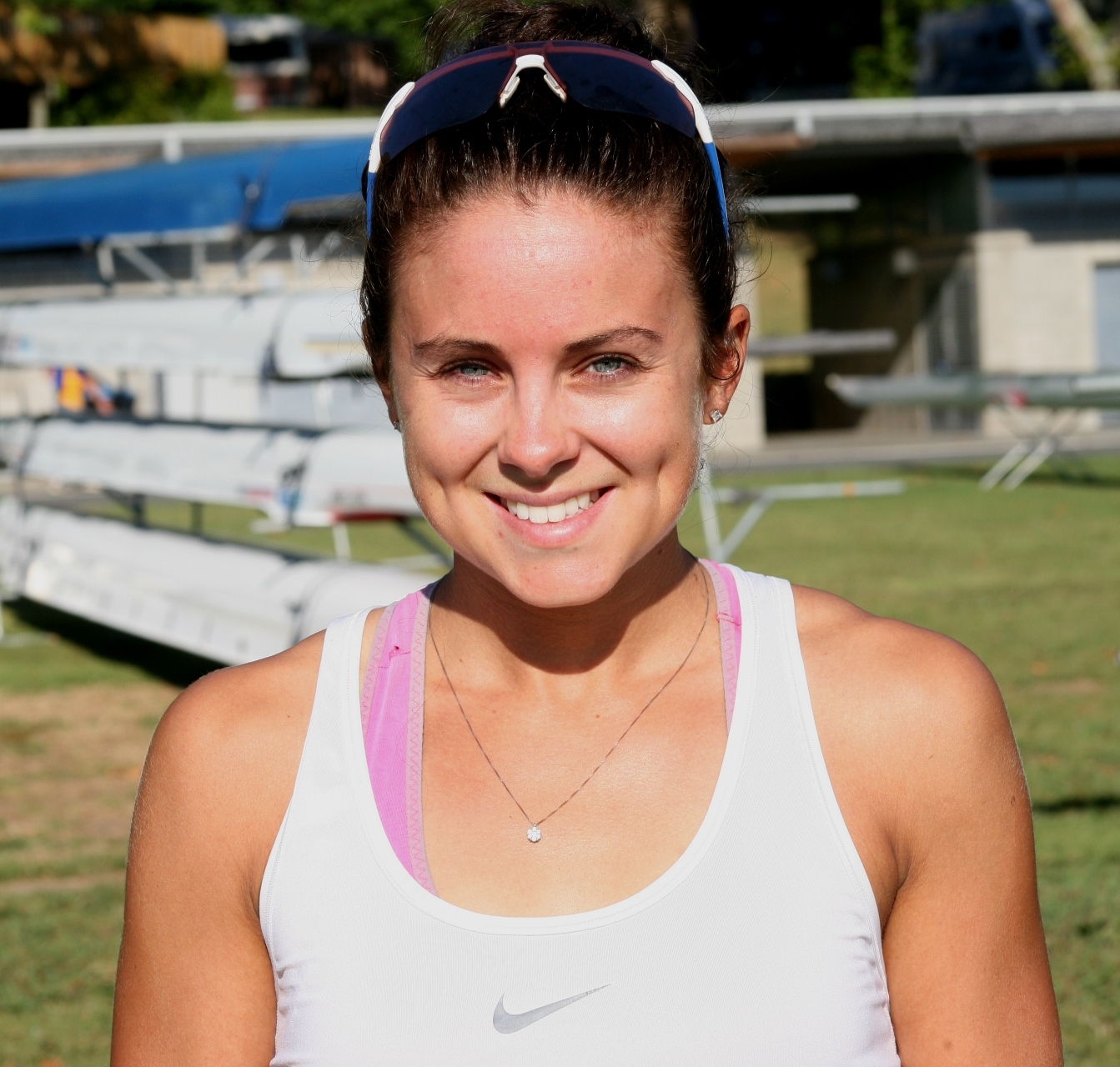
Edward in 2013

The 2016 Olympic campaign in Rio de Janeiro at the Rodrigo de Freitas Lagoon was another success for the New Zealand rowing team. The country's largest team ever, with 36 rowers, competed with 11 boats. Mahé Drysdale in the single sculls, and Hamish Bond and Eric Murray in the pair repeated their gold medal performances from four years earlier. The women's pair built the success from London and gained silver.

New Zealand initially qualified ten out of a possible fourteen boats for each of the rowing classes listed below. The majority of the rowing crews confirmed Olympic places for their boats at the 2015 FISA World Championships in Lac d'Aiguebelette, France, while a women's single sculls rower had added one more boat to the New Zealand roster as a result of a top three finish at the 2016 European & Final Qualification Regatta in Lucerne, Switzerland. The teams had to have also competed at the New Zealand Rowing Championships, held in Lake Karapiro, to assure their selection to the Olympic team for the Games.

The rowing team was named on 4 March 2016. On 1 July 2016, the Russian men's quadruple sculls boat was disqualified due to a doping violation, resulting in New Zealand gaining the men's quadruple sculls slot as the next-best non-qualifier. For the first time in Olympic history, New Zealand rowers participated in the men's lightweight four and the women's eight.

The 2013–16 Olympic cycle was the first full cycle under the auspices of High Performance Sport New Zealand (HPSNZ). Rowing was the largest beneficiary of HPSNZ's investment, receiving $32.1 million of the $162.2 million spent on Olympic sports during the four-year cycle.

Men

Athlete	Event	Heats		Repechage		Quarterfinals		Semifinals		Final	
Athlete	Event	Time	Rank	Time	Rank	Time	Rank	Time	Rank	Time	Rank
Mahé Drysdale	Single sculls	7:04.45	1 QF	Bye		6:46.51	1 SA/B	7:03.70	2 FA	6:41.34	1st place, gold medalist(s)
Hamish Bond; Eric Murray	Pair	6:41.75	1 SA/B	Bye		—N/a		6:23.36	1 FA	6:59.71	1st place, gold medalist(s)
Chris Harris; Robbie Manson	Double sculls	6:40.35	1 SA/B	Bye		—N/a		6:17.01	4 FB	7:06.80	11
Alistair Bond; James Hunter; James Lassche; Peter Taylor	Lightweight four	6:03.34	1 SA/B	Bye		—N/a		6:08.96	3 FA	6:28.14	5
George Bridgewater; Nathan Flannery; John Storey; Jade Uru	Quadruple sculls	5:59.13	4 R	5:58.92	6 FB	—N/a				6:18.92	10
Michael Brake; Isaac Grainger; Stephen Jones; Alex Kennedy; Shaun Kirkham; Tom Murray; Brook Robertson; Joe Wright; Caleb Shepherd (cox)	Eight	5:36:28	3 R	5:56.94	3 FA	—N/a				5:36.64	6

Women

Athlete	Event	Heats		Repechage		Quarterfinals		Semifinals		Final	
Athlete	Event	Time	Rank	Time	Rank	Time	Rank	Time	Rank	Time	Rank
Emma Twigg	Single sculls	8:17.02	1 QF	Bye		7:31.79	1 SA/B	7:48.20	2 FA	7:24.48	4
Genevieve Behrent; Rebecca Scown	Pair	7:09.23	1 SA/B	Bye		—N/a		7:29.67	2 FA	7:19.53	2nd place, silver medalist(s)
Eve Macfarlane; Zoe Stevenson	Double sculls	7:14.31	1 SA/B	Bye		—N/a		6:52.97	4 FB	7:50.74	12
Julia Edward; Sophie MacKenzie	Lightweight double sculls	7:02.01	2 SA/B	Bye		—N/a		7:19.27	2 FA	7:10.61	4
Genevieve Behrent; Kelsey Bevan; Emma Dyke; Kerri Gowler; Kayla Pratt; Grace Prendergast; Rebecca Scown; Ruby Tew; Francie Turner (cox)	Eight	6:12.05	2 R	6:34.90	3 FA	—N/a				6:05.48	4

=== 2020 Summer Olympics ===
New Zealand's team for the Tokyo Olympics is made up by 32 rowers and coxswains, plus Charlotte Spence, Davina Waddy, and Ollie Maclean as reserve rowers. The main qualification event were the 2019 World Rowing Championships, where nine boat classes were qualified: M1x, M2x, M2−, W1x, W2x, LW2x, W4x, W2−, W8+.

Rowing New Zealand announced in 2019 that its medal target for Tokyo was five. In early 2020, rowing commentator Ian Anderson listed the women's pair, the women's double scull, and the women's lightweight double scull as favourites in their boat classes, adding that the women's eight and the women's single scull were also "major contenders for gold". New Zealand had started in all 14 Olympic boat classes at the event but the LM2x, M4x, M4−, W4− and M8+ did not qualify.

The men's lightweight double scull (LM2x) had a further chance to qualify at the May 2021 Asian & Oceania Qualification Regatta but New Zealand did not start there. The other four boat classes had a further chance to qualify at the May 2021 World Rowing Final Olympic Qualification Regatta at the Rotsee in Switzerland. Only the men's eight was at the start and the team qualified through coming first.

Meanwhile, reigning world champion Zoe McBride (LW2−) had unexpectedly announced her retirement from rowing in March 2021 over health concerns. Rowing New Zealand tried to team up various lightweight rowers with Jackie Kiddle, including Lucy Strack who had retired from rowing in 2014, to fill the seat but no combinations resulted in performances that would have had a medal chance. A month after McBride's retirement, Rowing New Zealand withdrew the lightweight women's pair boat class from the Olympics, with Kiddle as a reigning world champion not travelling to Tokyo.

;Men

Athlete	Event	Heats		Repechage		Quarterfinals		Semifinals		Final	
Athlete	Event	Time	Rank	Time	Rank	Time	Rank	Time	Rank	Time	Rank
Jordan Parry	Single sculls	7:04.45	2 QF	Bye		7:18.48	4 SC/D	6:57.70	1 FC	6:55.55	13
Stephen Jones; Brook Robertson	Pair	6:56.53	3 SA/B	Bye		—N/a		6:41.46	6 FB	6:38.30	12
Chris Harris; Jack Lopas	Double sculls	6:12.05	3 SA/B	Bye		—N/a		6:26.08	4 FB	6:15.51	8
Hamish Bond; Sam Bosworth (cox); Michael Brake; Shaun Kirkham; Matt Macdonald; Tom Mackintosh; Tom Murray; Dan Williamson; Phillip Wilson	Eight	5:32.11	2 R	5:22.04	1 FA	—N/a				5:24.64	1st place, gold medalist(s)

;Women

Athlete	Event	Heats		Repechage		Quarterfinals		Semifinals		Final	
Athlete	Event	Time	Rank	Time	Rank	Time	Rank	Time	Rank	Time	Rank
Emma Twigg	Single sculls	7:35.22	1 QF	Bye		7:54.96	1 SA/B	7:20.70	1 FA	7:13.97 OR	1st place, gold medalist(s)
Kerri Gowler; Grace Prendergast	Pair	7:19.08	1 SA/B	Bye		—N/a		6:47.41 WR	1 FA	6:50.19	1st place, gold medalist(s)
Brooke Donoghue; Hannah Osborne	Double sculls	6:53.62	1 SA/B	Bye		—N/a		7:09.05	2 FA	6:44.82	2nd place, silver medalist(s)
Olivia Loe; Eve Macfarlane; Georgia Nugent-O'Leary; Ruby Tew	Quadruple sculls	6:25.23	5 R	6:39.91	3 FB	—N/a				6:29.00	8
Kelsey Bevan; Jackie Gowler; Kerri Gowler; Ella Greenslade; Emma Dyke; Grace Prendergast; Beth Ross; Caleb Shepherd (cox); Lucy Spoors	Eight	6:07.65	1 FA	Bye		—N/a				6:00.04	2nd place, silver medalist(s)

The make up of the eight had initially not been determined, with ten rowers—including two pairs of sisters—who were to travel to the Olympics: Kerri Gowler and Grace Prendergast (who will also compete in the pair), Jackie Gowler, Beth Ross, Phoebe Spoors, Kirstyn Goodger, Kelsey Bevan, Lucy Spoors, Emma Dyke, and Ella Greenslade. The entries were confirmed on 9 July 2021, with the coxless pair team of Kerri Gowler and Prendergast not being given double-duty. In the end, this changed again, K. Gowler and Prendergast did double-duty, with Goodger and P. Spoors remaining as reserves.

== Medal table ==
Medal	Name	Year	Event	Date
Gold	Warren Cole; Ross Collinge; Dick Joyce; Dudley Storey; Simon Dickie (cox)	1968	Men's coxed four	19 October 1968
Gold	Tony Hurt; Wybo Veldman; Dick Joyce; John Hunter; Lindsay Wilson; Joe Earl; Trevor Coker; Gary Robertson; Simon Dickie (cox)	1972	Men's eight	2 September 1972
Gold	Shane O'Brien; Les O'Connell; Conrad Robertson; Keith Trask	1984	Men's coxless four	5 August 1984
Gold	Rob Waddell	2000	Men's single sculls	23 September 2000
Gold	Caroline Evers-Swindell; Georgina Evers-Swindell	2004	Women's double sculls	21 August 2004
Gold	Georgina Evers-Swindell; Caroline Evers-Swindell	2008	Women's double sculls	16 August 2008
Gold	Nathan Cohen; Joseph Sullivan	2012	Men's double sculls	2 August 2012
Gold	Hamish Bond; Eric Murray	2012	Men's pair	3 August 2012
Gold	Mahé Drysdale	2012	Men's single sculls	3 August 2012
Gold	Hamish Bond; Eric Murray	2016	Men's coxless pair	11 August 2016
Gold	Mahé Drysdale	2016	Men's single sculls	13 August 2016
Gold	Kerri Gowler; Grace Prendergast	2020	Women's coxless pair	29 July 2021
Gold	Emma Twigg	2020	Women's single sculls	30 July 2021
Gold	Tom Mackintosh; Hamish Bond; Tom Murray; Michael Brake; Dan Williamson; Phillip Wilson; Shaun Kirkham; Matt Macdonald; Sam Bosworth (cox)	2020	Men's eight	30 July 2021
Silver	Bob Stiles; Rangi Thompson	1932	Men's coxless pair	13 August 1932
Silver	Dick Tonks; Dudley Storey; Ross Collinge; Noel Mills	1972	Men's coxless four	2 September 1968
Silver	Genevieve Behrent; Rebecca Scown	2016	Women's coxless pair	12 August 2016
Silver	Brooke Donoghue; Hannah Osborne	2020	Women's double sculls	28 July 2021
Silver	Ella Greenslade; Emma Dyke; Lucy Spoors; Kelsey Bevan; Grace Prendergast; Kerri Gowler; Beth Ross; Jackie Gowler; Caleb Shepherd (cox)	2020	Women's eight	30 July 2021
Bronze	Darcy Hadfield	1920	Men's single sculls	28 August 1920
Bronze	Ivan Sutherland; Trevor Coker; Peter Dignan; Lindsay Wilson; Joe Earl; Dave Rodger; Alec McLean; Tony Hurt; Simon Dickie (cox)	1976	Men's eight	25 July 1972
Bronze	Kevin Lawton; Barrie Mabbott; Don Symon; Ross Tong; Brett Hollister (cox)	1984	Men's coxed four	5 August 1984
Bronze	Eric Verdonk	1988	Men's single sculls	24 September 1988
Bronze	George Keys; Ian Wright; Greg Johnston; Chris White; Andrew Bird (cox)	1988	Men's coxed four	24 September 1988
Bronze	Lynley Hannen; Nikki Payne	1988	Women's coxless pair	24 September 1988
Bronze	Mahé Drysdale	2008	Men's single sculls	16 August 2008
Bronze	Nathan Twaddle; George Bridgewater	2008	Men's coxless pair	16 August 2008
Bronze	Juliette Haigh; Rebecca Scown	2012	Women's pair	1 August 2012
Bronze	Peter Taylor; Storm Uru	2012	Men's lightweight double sculls	4 August 2012

== New Zealand rowers ==
There have been 274 Olympic rowing appearances from New Zealand thus far. New Zealand men have been competing since the 1920 Summer Olympics, and make up 215 of those appearances. New Zealand women have been competing since the 1984 Summer Olympics, and have accumulated 59 appearances.

Competitors	96	00	04	08	12	20	24	28	32	36	48	52	56	60	64	68	72	76	80	84	88	92	96	00	04	08	12	16	20	24	Years
Men						1			11			5	8	1	15	14	19	18		21	10	10	9	5	6	11	15	22	14	19	
Women																				1	2	2	2	1	5	5	11	14	16	10	
NZ rowers						1			11			5	8	1	15	14	19	18		22	12	12	11	6	11	16	26	36	30	274	
All nation rowers		108	44	81	186	136	182	245	153	313	310	404	242	410	330	353	440	593	470	447	592	627	608	547	557	555	550	547	?	10,030	

The following table shows the individual rowers and coxswains that make up the 274 appearances, with many athletes having attended several Summer Olympics. In total, 186 individuals have represented the country at the Olympics, with 148 men and 38 women. These individuals have won 43 gold, 19 silver, and 30 bronze medals, i.e. a total of 92 medals. So far, five individuals have attended four Summer Olympics: Chris White (1984 to 1996), Mahé Drysdale (2004–2016), Eric Murray (2004–2016), and Hamish Bond and Emma Twigg have attended all Games since the 2008 Beijing Olympics.

Three athletes have won three Olympic medals: Simon Dickie (1968, 1972, and 1976), Mahé Drysdale (2008, 2012, and 2016), and Hamish Bond. Of those, Bond is the most successful with three gold medals. Six rowers or coxswains have won two gold medals: Simon Dickie, Dick Joyce, Mahé Drysdale, Caroline and Georgina Evers-Swindell, and Eric Murray.

Sortable and collapsible table
#	NZOC id	Rower	Gender	Games	Appearances	Gold medal	Silver medal	Bronze medal	Medals
1	8	Darcy Hadfield	M	1920	1			1	1
2	25	George Cooke	M	1932	1				
3	26	Somers Cox	M	1932	1				
4	30	Delmont Gullery	M	1932	1				
5	31	Lawrence Jackson	M	1932	1				
6	35	Jack Macdonald	M	1932	1				
7	36	Noel Pope	M	1932	1				
8	38	Bert Sandos	M	1932	1				
9	39	Charles Saunders	M	1932	1				
10	41	John Solomon	M	1932	1				
11	42	Cyril Stiles	M	1932	1		1		1
12	44	Rangi Thompson	M	1932	1		1		1
13	63	Kerry Ashby	M	1952	1				
14	68	Ted Johnson	M	1952	1				
15	69	Colin Johnstone	M	1952, 1956	2				
16	72	John O'Brien	M	1952	1				
17	75	Bill Tinnock	M	1952	1				
18	87	Reg Douglas	M	1956	1				
19	90	Donald Gemmell	M	1956	1				
20	95	James Hill	M	1956, 1960	2				
21	104	Ray Laurent	M	1956	1				
22	106	Peter Lucas	M	1956	1				
23	109	Bob Parker	M	1956	1				
24	123	Allan Tong	M	1956	1				
25	160	Darien Boswell	M	1964	1				
26	161	Mark Brownlee	M	1964, 1968	2				
27	167	Alexander Clark	M	1964	1				
28	170	Peter Delaney	M	1964	1				
29	171	Alistair Dryden	M	1964, 1968	2				
30	174	John Gibbons	M	1964, 1968	2				
31	186	Peter Masfen	M	1964	1				
32	193	Robert Page	M	1964, 1968	2				
33	194	George Paterson	M	1964	1				
34	196	Tony Popplewell	M	1964	1				
35	198	Doug Pulman	M	1964	1				
36	199	Raymond Skinner	M	1964	1				
37	201	Dudley Storey	M	1964, 1968, 1972	3	1	1		2
38	203	Murray Watkinson	M	1964, 1972	2				
39	204	Alan Webster	M	1964, 1968	2				
40	218	Gil Cawood	M	1968	1				
41	221	Warren Cole	M	1968, 1972	2	1			1
42	222	Ross Collinge	M	1968, 1972	2	1	1		2
43	224	Simon Dickie	M	1968, 1972, 1976	3	2		1	3
44	228	John Hunter	M	1968, 1972	2	1			1
45	230	Dick Joyce	M	1968, 1972	2	2			2
46	231	Tom Just	M	1968	1				
47	254	Wybo Veldman	M	1968, 1972	2	1			1
48	265	John Clark	M	1972	1				
49	266	Trevor Coker	M	1972, 1976	2	1		1	2
50	273	Joe Earl	M	1972, 1976	2	1		1	2
51	283	Tony Hurt	M	1972, 1976	2	1		1	2
52	286	Peter Lindsay	M	1972	1				
53	287	David Lindstrom	M	1972, 1976	2				
54	298	Noel Mills	M	1972	1		1		1
55	299	Chris Nilsson	M	1972	1				
56	309	Gary Robertson	M	1972	1	1			1
57	319	Dick Tonks	M	1972	1		1		1
58	323	Lindsay Wilson	M	1972, 1976	2	1		1	2
59	336	Ian Boserio	M	1976	1				
60	342	Peter Dignan	M	1976	1			1	1
61	349	Viv Haar	M	1976	1				
62	354	Danny Keane	M	1976	1				
63	356	Des Lock	M	1976	1				
64	357	Tim Logan	M	1976	1				
65	358	Grant McAuley	M	1976	1				
66	359	Alec McLean	M	1976	1				
67	361	Bob Murphy	M	1976	1				
68	372	Dave Rodger	M	1976, 1984	2			1	1
69	375	David Simmons	M	1976	1				
70	377	Ivan Sutherland	M	1976	1			1	1
71	401	Nigel Atherfold	M	1984	1				
72	434	Stephanie Foster	F	1984	1				
73	446	Andy Hay	M	1984	1				
74	447	Brett Hollister	M	1984	1			1	1
75	448	Allan Horan	M	1984	1				
76	449	Geoff Horan	M	1984	1				
77	452	Greg Johnston	M	1984, 1988	2			1	1
78	456	George Keys	M	1984, 1988	2			1	1
79	461	Kevin Lawton	M	1984	1			1	1
80	463	Barrie Mabbott	M	1984	1			1	1
81	482	Shane O'Brien	M	1984	1	1			1
82	483	Les O'Connell	M	1984	1	1			1
83	491	Gary Reid	M	1984	1				
84	495	Conrad Robertson	M	1984	1	1			1
85	504	Mike Stanley	M	1984	1				
86	506	Andrew Stevenson	M	1984	1				
87	508	Don Symon	M	1984	1			1	1
88	515	Ross Tong	M	1984	1			1	1
89	516	Keith Trask	M	1984	1	1			1
90	519	Chris White	M	1984, 1988, 1992, 1996	4			1	1
91	520	Roger White-Parsons	M	1984	1				
92	534	Andrew Bird	M	1988	1			1	1
93	537	Campbell Clayton-Greene	M	1988, 1992	2				
94	542	Geoff Cotter	M	1988	1				
95	543	Bill Coventry	M	1988, 1992	1				
96	552	Neil Gibson	M	1988	1				
97	555	Lynley Hannen	F	1988	1			1	1
98	570	Nikki Payne	F	1988	1			1	1
99	578	Eric Verdonk	M	1988, 1992	2			1	1
100	582	Ian Wright	M	1988, 1992, 1996	3			1	1
101	593	Philippa Baker	F	1992, 1996	2				
102	600	Scott Brownlee	M	1992, 1996, 2000	3				
103	610	Toni Dunlop	M	1992, 1996, 2000	3				
104	636	Brenda Lawson	F	1992, 1996	2				
105	646	Guy Melville	M	1992	1				
106	658	Pat Peoples	M	1992	1				
107	670	Carl Sheehan	M	1992	1				
108	712	Rob Hamill	M	1996	1				
109	727	Alastair Mackintosh	M	1996	1				
110	738	Mike Rodger	M	1996	1				
111	739	Dave Schaper	M	1996, 2000	2				
112	745	Rob Waddell	M	1996, 2000, 2008	3	1			1
113	794	Rob Hellstrom	M	2000	1				
114	858	Sonia Waddell	F	2000, 2004	1				
115	883	George Bridgewater	M	2004, 2008, 2016	3			1	1
116	891	Nicky Coles	F	2004, 2008	2				
117	896	Mahé Drysdale	M	2004, 2008, 2012, 2016	4	2		1	3
118	898	Caroline Evers-Swindell	F	2004, 2008	2	2			2
119	899	Georgina Evers-Swindell	F	2004, 2008	2	2			2
120	907	Juliette Haigh	F	2004, 2008, 2012	3			1	1
121	928	Donald Leach	M	2004	1				
122	933	Carl Meyer	M	2004, 2008	2				
123	934	Eric Murray	M	2004, 2008, 2012, 2016	4	2			2
124	966	Nathan Twaddle	M	2004, 2008	2			1	1
125	1002	Hamish Bond	M	2008, 2012, 2016, 2020	4	3			3
126	1013	Nathan Cohen	M	2008, 2012	2	1			1
127	1016	James Dallinger	M	2008, 2012, 2016	3			1	1
128	1094	Peter Taylor	M	2008, 2012, 2016	3			1	1
129	1097	Emma Twigg	F	2008, 2012, 2016, 2020	4	1			1
130	1098	Storm Uru	M	2008, 2012	2			1	1
131	1125	Michael Arms	M	2012	1				
132	1126	Louise Ayling	F	2012	1				
133	1129	Fiona Bourke	F	2012	1				
134	1139	Julia Edward	F	2012, 2016	2				
135	1150	Sarah Gray	F	2012	1				
136	1157	Chris Harris	M	2012, 2016, 2020	3				
137	1173	Eve MacFarlane	F	2012, 2016, 2020	3				
138	1174	Robbie Manson	M	2012, 2016	2				
139	1189	Sean O'Neill	M	2012	1				
140	1191	Fiona Paterson	F	2012	1				
141	1200	Anna Reymer	F	2012	1				
142	1208	Rebecca Scown	F	2012, 2016	2		1	1	2
143	1214	John Storey	M	2012, 2016	2				
144	1216	Joseph Sullivan	M	2012	1	1			1
145	1219	Louise Trappitt	F	2012	1				
146	1220	Matthew Trott	M	2012	1				
147	1223	Jade Uru	M	2012, 2016	2				
148	1230	Tyson Williams	M	2012	1				
149	1249	Genevieve Behrent	F	2016	1		1		1
150	1251	Kelsey Bevan	F	2016, 2020	2		1		1
151	1252	Alistair Bond	M	2016	1				
152	1254	Michael Brake	M	2016, 2020	2	1			1
153	1267	Emma Dyke	F	2016, 2020	2		1		1
154	1270	Nathan Flannery	M	2016	1				
155	1278	Kerri Gowler	F	2016, 2020	2		1		1
156	1279	Isaac Grainger	M	2016	1				
157	1282	James Hunter	M	2016	1				
158	1289	Stephen Jones	M	2016, 2020	2				
159	1294	Alex Kennedy	M	2016	1				
160	1297	Shaun Kirkham	M	2016, 2020	2	1			1
161	1301	James Lassche	M	2016	1				
162	1304	Sophie MacKenzie	F	2016	1				
163	1322	Tom Murray	M	2016, 2020	2	1			1
164	1334	Kayla Pratt	F	2016	1				
165	1335	Grace Prendergast	F	2016, 2020	2	1	1		2
166	1339	Brook Robertson	M	2016, 2020	2				
167	1348	Caleb Shepherd	M	2016, 2020	2		1		1
168	1350	Zoe Stevenson	F	2016	1				
169	1353	Ruby Tew	F	2016, 2020	2				
170	1357	Francie Turner	F	2016	1				
171	1371	Joe Wright	M	2016	1				
172		Jordan Parry	M	2020	1				
173		Jack Lopas	M	2020	1				
174		Tom Mackintosh	M	2020	1	1			1
175		Dan Williamson	M	2020	1	1			1
176		Phillip Wilson	M	2020	1	1			1
177		Matt Macdonald	M	2020	1	1			1
178		Sam Bosworth	M	2020	1	1			1
179		Kerri Gowler	F	2020	1	1	1		2
180		Brooke Donoghue	F	2020	1		1		1
181		Hannah Osborne	F	2020	1		1		1
182		Olivia Loe	F	2020	1				
183		Georgia Nugent-O'Leary	F	2020	1				
184		Ella Greenslade	F	2020	1		1		1
185		Lucy Spoors	F	2020	1		1		1
186		Beth Ross	F	2020	1		1		1
#	NZOC id	Rower	Gender	Games	274 appearances	43	19	30	92 medals
