= 1972 New Zealand eight =

New Zealand rowing team

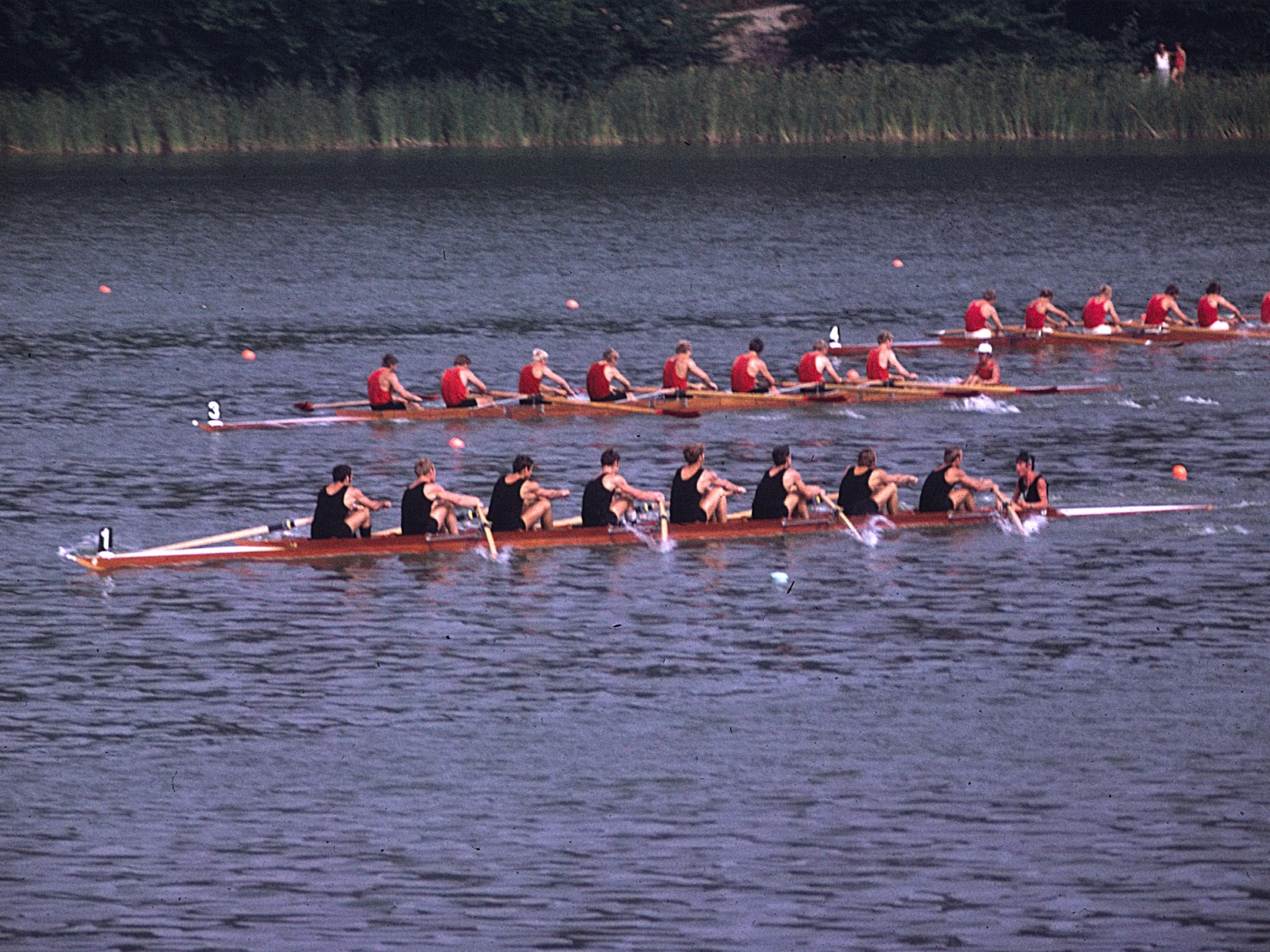
Semi-final at the 1971 European Rowing Championships; New Zealand is ahead of the Soviet Union and Czechoslovakia

The 1972 New Zealand eight was a team of Olympic gold medallists in rowing from New Zealand, having previously won the 1971 European Rowing Championships. At the time, the eight was regarded as the blue ribbon class of rowing, and the sport still had amateur-status in New Zealand, unlike many other nations competing in rowing. After a disappointing Olympic performance at the 1968 Summer Olympics by the New Zealand eight, national selectors Rusty Robertson, Don Rowlands, and Fred Strachan were tasked with assembling a new crew. Robertson was also the team's coach. The next time a New Zealand eight competed was at the 1970 World Rowing Championships, where they came third. The team was once again significantly changed for the next rowing season, with the 1971 edition of the European Rowing Championships and other international regattas beforehand seen as the ultimate test for the 1972 Summer Olympics. The team put up an impressive performance, beat the highly favoured East German eight, and became European champion; at the time the win was regarded as holding world championship status. No further changes were made to the team, not even their seating position, for the 1972 season. Despite a shoe-string budget, financial constraints, and all rowers working part-time, the 1971 success was repeated and the team won Olympic gold in Munich. The president of the International Olympic Committee (IOC), Avery Brundage, was a zealous advocate of amateurism; he was so impressed by the New Zealand performance that he insisted on handing out the gold medals himself. During the medal ceremony, much to almost everybody's surprise, "God Defend New Zealand" was played instead of the national anthem, "God Save the Queen". It was the impetus for a campaign to make "God Defend New Zealand" the New Zealand anthem, and in 1977 it was gazetted as having equal status to the traditional anthem.

The team won some significant awards and recognition for its successes. The rules of the "Sportsman of the Year Award" had to be changed so that a team could win the supreme award; this was awarded after their European championship win. Brundage also awarded the Taher Pacha Trophy to the team for distinction in amateur sport in 1971. After the Olympic success, the team was again awarded "Sportsman of the Year"; the first time a back-to-back award had been handed out. Rowlands, their manager, was appointed a Member of the Order of the British Empire (MBE) in the 1973 New Year Honours. Over time, coach Robertson, manager Rowlands, and then the team as a whole were inducted into the New Zealand Sports Hall of Fame.

== Background ==
There were expectations for the New Zealand eight to win a medal at the 1968 Summer Olympics in Mexico City, but the team came fourth and this was regarded as a failure. The situation was the opposite for the other New Zealand boat in Mexico. The coxed four was technically a spare, the crew had travelled to be available as a reserve for the eight team. The coxed four won an unexpected gold medal. Getting the amateur rowers to Mexico had required a massive fund-raising exercise and the New Zealand rowing association was in no position to send rowers to any international regattas in 1969, but targeted the 1970 World Rowing Championships in St. Catharines, Ontario, Canada. At the time, the eight was seen as the most important boat class, and three from the Mexico eight trained for the 1970 world championships: Wybo Veldman, John Hunter, and Gil Cawood. Most of the crew of the 1968 coxed four made another four members: Warren Cole, Dick Joyce, Dudley Storey, and cox Simon Dickie. The team was complemented by experienced sculler Murray Watkinson and a young Gary Robertson. Ross Collinge from the Mexico coxed four had attended the trials but missed selection. After having won both its heat and the semifinal in Canada (beating the Soviet Union and West Germany in the latter), the boat came third. East Germany dominated, and the Soviet Union was a mere 0.2 seconds ahead of the New Zealand boat. The team did not gel, and Watkinson's selection became regarded as a mistake; as a single sculler, he had become used to "doing his thing in his own time".

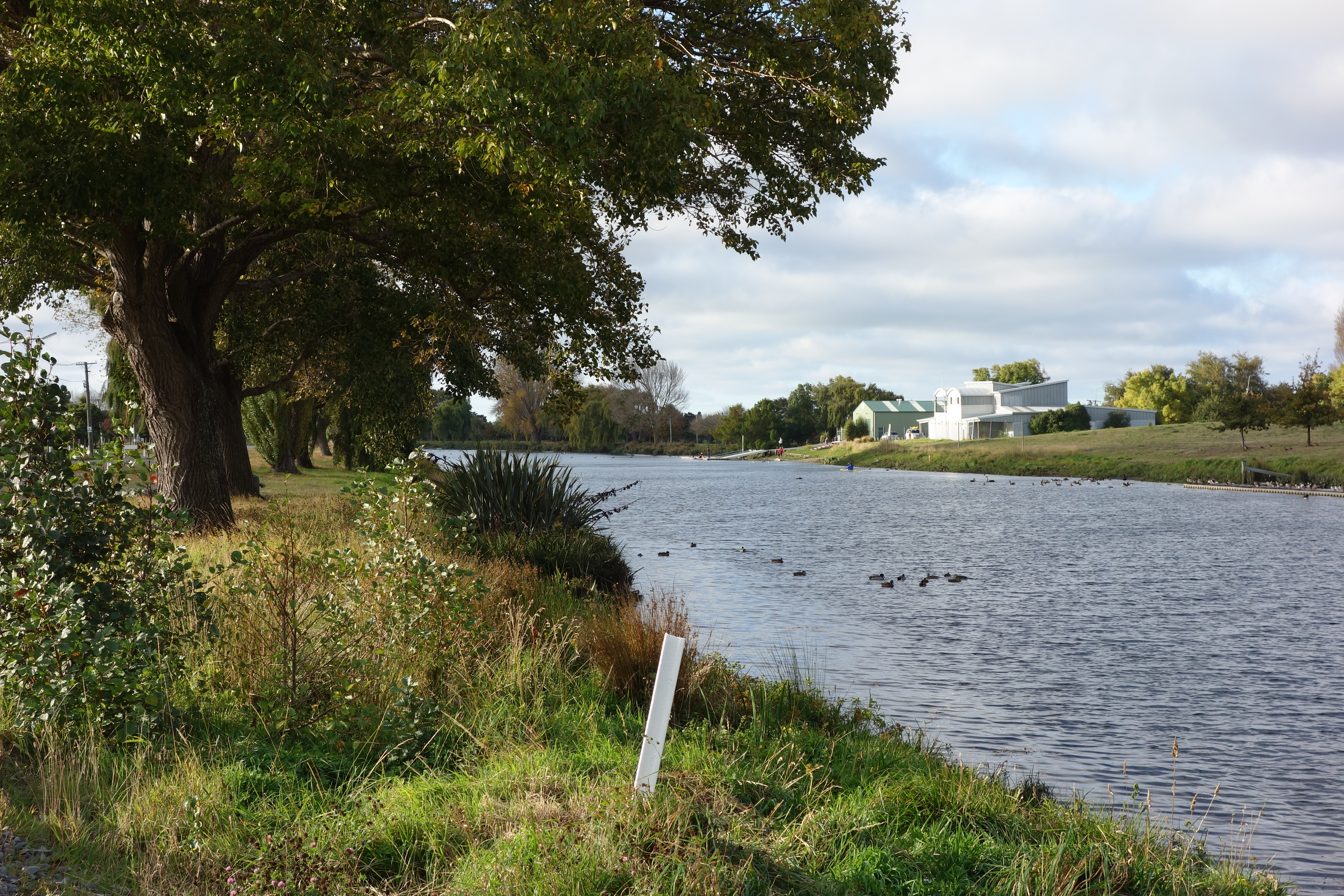
Rowing club buildings at Kerrs Reach on the Avon River / Ōtākaro

The officials at the time were Rusty Robertson as coach, Don Rowlands as manager, fund-raiser and organiser, and Fred Strachan as strategist. The coach was the uncle of the youngest crew member, Gary Robertson. Robertson had been appointed coach in 1967 and it was then that the national training centre relocated from Auckland to Christchurch, under great controversy. Kerrs Reach on Christchurch's Avon River / Ōtākaro was more convenient to reach for Dunedin-based Strachan than Auckland, and coach Robertson embarked on a daily drive from Oamaru—a 500 kilometres (310 mi) return journey–after work whenever there was a training day.

== 1971 European Rowing Championships ==
The 1971 European Rowing Championships were seen as an important stepping stone in the preparation for the 1972 Olympic Games at Munich. The intention was to select a crew and then make minimal changes prior to Munich. At the time, both the World Rowing Championships and the Summer Olympic Games were held at four-year intervals, and the annual European Rowing Championships in the in-between years were regarded as having quasi-world championship status. Rowing officials decided Watkinson would revert to single sculls, and for Storey to return to the coxed four. Cawood was no longer available. The three were replaced by three developing rowers—Lindsay Wilson, Joe Earl, and Trevor Coker—and they were teamed with the other young rower, Gary Robertson, to form the bow of the boat. The biggest selection surprise was Earl, as he had just turned 18. Although coached by Strachan at St. Andrew's College in Christchurch and known to all but one of the selectors, Earl himself doubted that he would have been chosen ahead of more experienced oarsmen. The experienced rowers chosen for the stern—Cole, Veldman, Joyce, and Hunter—were kept from the 1970 crew. The day before the team was to assemble in Christchurch for their first training, Cole pulled out for family reasons. Tony Hurt from Auckland was chosen to replace him. Joyce was the initial stroke, but this did not work out. He was replaced by Hurt who, although from a sculling background and, at 183 centimetres (6 ft 0 in) and 83 kilograms (13.1 st) small for a rower, worked out well for the team. Veldman called him "a brilliant stroke". On Sunday afternoon, the four stern rowers and their bow counterparts would race each other in coxless fours. Dickie recalls that the experienced rowers in the stern had a slight edge, but they did not win every time, and there was great rivalry.

The crew arrived in Europe to find that both their new four and eight Italian Donoratico boats were unsatisfactory. Joyce applied his engineering skills and moved all seats backwards, and that improved the boats' performances. Regattas were rowed in Duisburg and Klagenfurt, and the New Zealanders set new course records at both venues. At the European Rowing Championships, held at the Danish Lake Bagsværd north of Copenhagen, the favoured East Germans, but also the West Germans, also set new course records in their heat, only to be bettered by the New Zealanders in their heat. In the semi-final, New Zealand faced the Soviet Union, the team that had narrowly beaten them for second place at the 1970 World Championships. Both New Zealand and East Germany won their semi-finals in convincing style. The East Germans were the favourites, being the incumbent European and World champions, and they had not been beaten in five years since they came together in age-group competitions. They were full-time athletes, nominally employed by the Police. Veldman described them as being like clones, as their rowers were well matched in height and arm length. There were also rumours of doping, something that would not be confirmed in its full effect across all sports until 1993. The race strategy for the Danish final, where the New Zealand eight would meet the favourites East Germany for the first time, was simple: sprint for the first 500 metres and then somehow hang on to win. Joyce later explained that they all knew that if the East Germans would get in front, they would never get past them again. Throughout the race, the New Zealanders were always ahead. They won with a time of 5:33.92, closely followed by East Germany at 5:34.32, and the Soviet Union in 5:39.74 well back.

Rowlands saw Thomas Keller, the president of the international rowing organisation FISA, shed tears of delight. Avery Brundage, the president of the International Olympic Committee (IOC), awarded the team the Taher Pacha Trophy (also known as the Mohammed Taher Trophy) for distinction in amateur sport. In November 1971, the team won the "Sportsman of the Year Award"; it is now known as the "Supreme Award" at the Halberg Awards. The rules had to be altered so that the award could be given to a team. It was the first time that the award was won for rowing.

== 1972 Summer Olympics ==
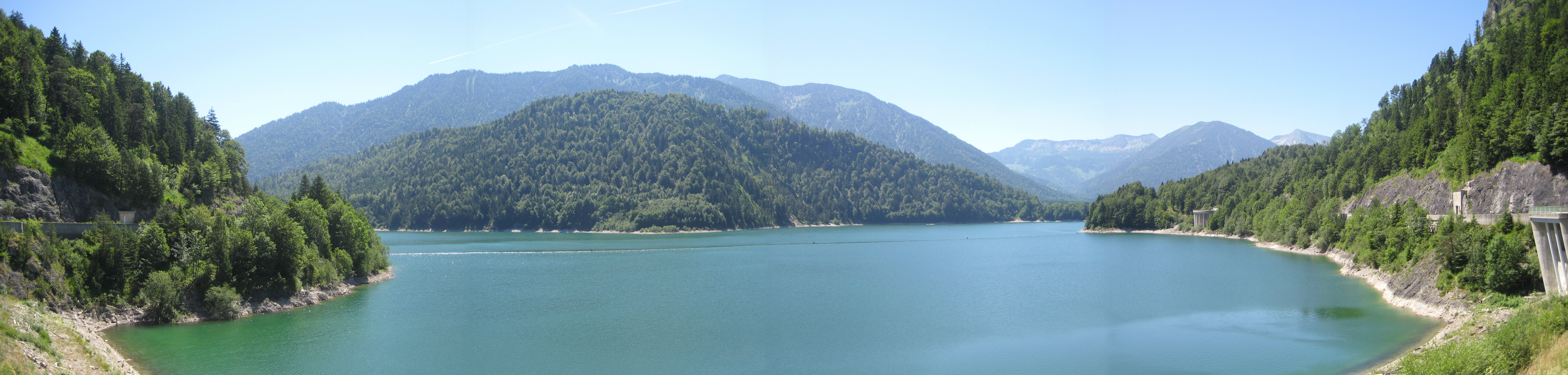
In Europe, the New Zealanders were based in Lenggries and trained on the Sylvenstein Reservoir

For the next rowing season, Strachan became manager in place of Rowlands. Trials were held in March 1972 in Wanganui, the traditional location for national trials, with the Whanganui River offering good rowing opportunities. Whilst there was an expectation that the crew would stay together, Gary Robertson was personally uncertain of his place and believed that Storey would take his seat. Cole tried to get back into the team but was unsuccessful. Ultimately the team remained unchanged from the previous season.

One of Strachan's first tasks was to unite the rowing fraternity at their annual general meeting behind the plan to send an eight to the Olympics. He was given support, but it was mostly left to the team and their organisers to raise the approximately $25,000 needed for the seven weeks in Europe. To keep costs down, Strachan organised for the rowers to stay in the Bavarian town of Lenggries, about an hour's drive away from the Munich regatta course. Whilst there were no dedicated rowing facilities in Lenggries, the Sylvenstein Reservoir provided good training opportunities. Beyond that, the locals were brilliant hosts and many friendships formed at the time.

The team management had again ordered a shell from Donoratico, and they delivered them two boats; one built exactly as ordered, but a second that the manufacturer thought would finally address all the teams' desires. In addition, they had a Karlisch shell built by Empacher available to them, but it was not well liked. The team preferred the second Donoratico but their coach thought the Karlisch was superior. Again, Joyce was asked to use his engineering skills to make some modifications. A day after he had finished, one of the seats in the Donoratico collapsed and left that boat unusable. From then on, the Karlisch was used.

The first regatta in Germany was a warm-up event at the Olympic rowing course. The New Zealanders, still using their Donoratico, were beaten by the American team. At the next regatta in Hanover, the Americans were beaten by a two–second margin, and the next day the New Zealanders beat the Australian team (second at the 1968 Olympics). A few days out from the Olympics, Earl received news that his father had died on his way to Munich. Whilst doctors had advised against travel due to a weak heart, his parents went nonetheless and his father died when they were in Italy. Earl still went ahead with the competition, and Strachan remarked later that "he still performed". The funeral had to wait until the rowers had returned to New Zealand.

When the Olympic racing started, the New Zealanders won their heat comfortably. There was a false start caused by one of the officials, for which the New Zealanders received an official apology – unlike the other crews, they had not heard the recall bell and started racing in earnest. In the real heat, they eased off after the first 1000 metres but still won by 11 seconds. The semi-final was more of a challenge, with a long delay due to wind that was affecting different lanes with varying intensity. The West German crew, the 1968 Olympic champions, had a more sheltered lane and overtook the New Zealand crew at half-way point when the boat was hit by a gust of wind. Robertson, the coach, was livid about the conditions they had to row in, and he decided to knock the other teams' confidence through some mind games. It was announced to the media that the New Zealanders would do some 500 metre sprints on the regatta course. It worked, and between 50 and 60 people with stop watches turned up to measure the performance. Robertson explained his strategy in his usual straightforward manner:

We're bloody good and they [the opposition] had better know they [the New Zealand eight] are bloody good, because it's too late for them to do anything about it.

— Rusty Robertson, Reflections of Gold

The rowers themselves played their own game. Their apartment in the Olympic Village was near the entrance and other teams had to walk past. The New Zealanders were on a one-can-of-beer-a-day ration and timed drinking those when others teams went past, stacking the empties, and—in typical New Zealand fashion—they went around the village barefoot. The German media soon wrote about the partying New Zealanders, and this evoked a discussion in West Germany how it could be possible for those larrikins to "beat our boys?"

"God Defend New Zealand"
Instrumental version of "God Defend New Zealand"

The final was rowed on 2 September; an hour earlier, the New Zealand coxless four had won silver. The New Zealand eight dominated its race to the extent that the interesting part was who would take silver and bronze. Four countries battled for the lower medals: East Germany, West Germany, the US and the Soviet Union. In the end, it came to a photo finish, with the United States declared silver medallist, 0.06 seconds ahead of East Germany. For the New Zealanders, everybody was in sync. Veldman later commented that he had had harder races at club level; it was like having "created a big flywheel". Some of the team later said that their 1971 gold medal win was the "finer display" of their skill. The outgoing IOC president, Brundage, was not scheduled to present the medals but insisted on doing so. And the most memorable moment was yet to come – the crew standing on the victory dais overcome with emotion and "bawling like babies" is one of New Zealand's most memorable sporting moments. The occasion was made more poignant by "God Defend New Zealand" being played rather than the traditional "God Save the Queen". This was not yet the New Zealand anthem and it thus contravened Olympic rules. The New Zealand Olympic liaison officer, Hans Lennarz, is credited with having organised this, and it contributed to the emotion of the occasion. Collinge was the only one who knew that the new anthem would be played, as he had by chance been in the main stadium when the German army band rehearsed it, but he had chosen not to tell anyone about it. It is often reported that this was the first time that "God Defend New Zealand" was played at the Olympics, even by the book written about the new anthem, but this is incorrect. For reasons unknown, both anthems had been performed 20 years earlier—one after the other—in Helsinki at the medal ceremony for Yvette Williams' victory in the 1952 long jump.

The two rowing medals won in Munich made up a large part of the New Zealand team's medal haul. There was only one other medal won in Munich across the 14 sports in which the country competed with 89 athletes, and that was an athletics bronze by Rod Dixon in the men's 1500 metres. It was the last time an Olympic rowing race was won in a wooden boat. Whilst the previous year, the New Zealanders had left Denmark the day after the competition, this time they stayed on as their competition had been held in the first week of the Olympics. This provided the opportunity to get to know other rowers on a social basis, and the East Germans invited the other medallists to a garden party at their apartment in the Olympic Village. Dickie, a "larger-than-life personality", was the life of the party and organised drinking games for the three teams.

== Aftermath ==
The team never rowed competitively together after Munich, but they again won the "Sportsman of the Year Award"; it was the first time that the award had been won twice in a row. Hurt retired from competitive rowing, and the others were broken up for different boats. New Zealand did not enter an eight at the 1973 European Rowing Championships in Moscow, but had a coxed four (which included Robertson and Earl) and a coxless pair (including Veldman, who returned with a silver medal). An eight was next compiled for the 1974 World Rowing Championships in Lucerne, Switzerland. Four of the 1971–72 team were included: Hurt, Wilson, Coker, and Earl. The boat won a bronze medal, beaten by the United States and Great Britain. Hurt's recollection of the race is that they were the last boat out, as they weren't ready and still trying to straighten the boat. They never settled properly and thus couldn't catch the leading teams.

Subsequent to the 1972 Olympics, a campaign started to make "God Defend New Zealand" the national anthem. It was gazetted as the country's second national anthem on 21 November 1977, on equal standing with "God Save the Queen".

Rowlands, the manager for the 1972 team, was appointed a Member of the Order of the British Empire (MBE) in the 1973 New Year Honours for services to rowing. In 1990, the team was inducted into the New Zealand Sports Hall of Fame. The citation reads in part:

Their win, their manner in achieving it and their laid-bare emotion on the victory dais when God Defend New Zealand was played at their Olympic victory ceremony was a seminal moment in New Zealand sport, one of those moments which for years later people can recall as if it was yesterday.

— Ron Palenski, New Zealand Sports Hall of Fame

Their coach, Rusty Robertson, and their manager, Don Rowlands, were also inducted into the Hall of Fame.

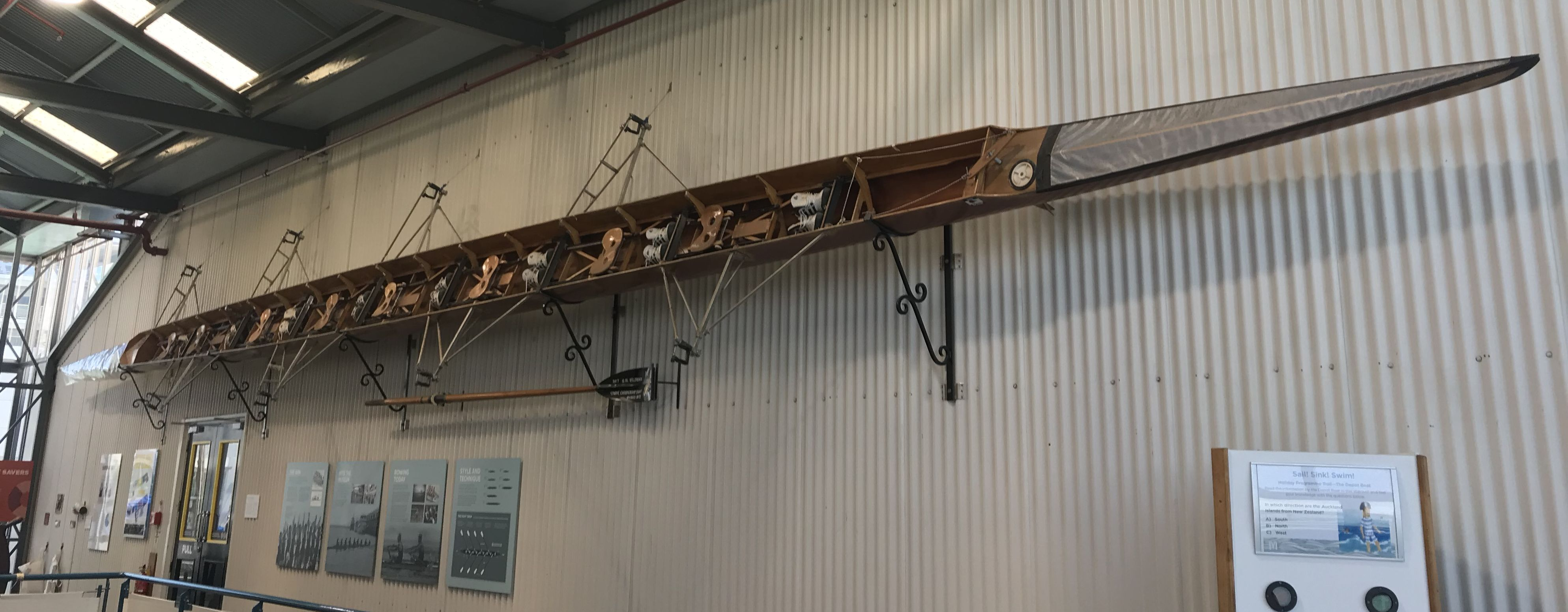
The 1972 Karlisch on display at the New Zealand Maritime Museum

The original intention was to sell the New Zealand boats in Europe before leaving for home, but the historical significance of the Karlisch hull was recognised and the boat returned to New Zealand. It was used by the Auckland Rowing Club as a training boat for many years. In 1996, the Karlisch was bought by the Stevenson family and donated to the New Zealand Maritime Museum. After the boat was owned by the museum, the team members went out for a row on Waitematā Harbour. Only Coker was missing—he had died in 1981 from a brain tumour—but his son took his place.

The eight surviving members of the 1972 team carried the Commonwealth Games flag into Mount Smart Stadium at the opening ceremony of the 1990 Commonwealth Games in Auckland. When the 2007 World Rowing Championships were again held in Munich, Chris Nilsson—who in 1972 had been a member of the coxed four but was by then a rowing coach—arranged for the New Zealand team to stay at Lenggries once more, rekindling old friendships.

In 1980, the German publishing house Rowohlt Verlag published a book of lists—Rowohlts Bunte Liste—modelled on the 1977 American bestseller The Book of Lists. The German sports journalist Karl-Heinrich von Groddeck, himself a rower at three Olympic Games, was asked to compile a list of the ten best coxed eight crews of all times. He put the Deutschland-Achter of 1960, with which he himself won an Olympic gold medal, in second place, but put the 1972 New Zealand eight in top spot. In 2008, New Zealand sports journalist Joseph Romanos picked the 1972 gold medal win as New Zealand's best ever team performance at the Olympic Games.

== Individuals ==
The table below shows the individuals who were involved in the 1971 and 1972 campaigns either as athletes or officials. Two of the officials and two of the rowers have since died. The most recent to die was Dickie in December 2017 amidst the team organising a reunion in conjunction with the next Halberg Awards presentation.

Name	born	died	role
Rusty Robertson	1927	17 Feb 1990	coach
Fred Strachan	17 Aug 1923		manager in 1972
Don Rowlands	17 Jun 1926	18 Mar 2015	manager in 1971
Gary Robertson	12 Apr 1950		bow
Trevor Coker	1 Oct 1949	23 Aug 1981	seat 2
Joe Earl	1 Oct 1952		seat 3
Lindsay Wilson	15 Oct 1948		seat 4
John Hunter	8 Nov 1943		seat 5
Dick Joyce	1 May 1946		seat 6
Wybo Veldman	21 Oct 1946		seat 7
Tony Hurt	30 Mar 1946		stroke
Simon Dickie	31 Mar 1951	13 Dec 2017	cox

== See also ==
- 1982 New Zealand eight

== Notes ==
Awards
Preceded by Harry Kent	New Zealand Sportsman of the Year; 1971, 1972	Succeeded by Glenn Turner
