= Donald Leach =

Donald Leach may refer to:

- Donald Leach (rower), New Zealand rower
- Donald Leach (physicist), Scottish physicist and politician
