= Fred Strachan =

New Zealand rowing coach (born 1923)

Fred Strachan QSM
Personal information
- Birth name: Frederick Strachan
- Born: 17 August 1923 (age 101); New Zealand
- Occupation: Sports coach

Sport
- Country: New Zealand
- Sport: Rowing
- Club: North End Rowing Club

Frederick Strachan QSM (born 17 August 1923) is a New Zealand retired rowing coach.

== Biography ==
Strachan was born on 17 August 1923. Beginning in 1944, he has been a member of the North End Rowing Club (NERC) in Dunedin. He was a provincial representative rower for the Otago Rowing Association in 1948. He was involved in rowing for seven decades and 70 rowers coached by him have represented New Zealand internationally. In the 1960s, Strachan was one of the few rowing coaches who supported women's rowing.

In 1960, Strachan coached a coxed four at NERC that was the first boat for the club to win a national championship. He was a selector for Rowing New Zealand from 1964 to 1988. In the late 1960s, Strachan promoted greater use of science in high performance sport. He was selector for the 1968 coxed four that had been intended as potential substitutes for the 1968 New Zealand eight but who ended up being nominated as a separate team and returned with gold from the 1968 Summer Olympics. He was selector of the New Zealand eight that won gold at the 1971 European Rowing Championships and gold at the 1972 Summer Olympics. He was the manager of the 1972 New Zealand Olympic rowing team. Strachan later mentored Hamish Bond, who credits Strachan with having turned him into an elite rower.

Strachan has officiated for FISA, the World Rowing Federation, at the 1964 Summer Olympics, 1968 Summer Olympics, 1970 World Rowing Championships, 1972 Summer Olympics, 1976 Summer Olympics, 1978 World Rowing Championships, and 1981 World Rowing Championships. He retired from FISA in 1988 when he hit the age barrier. He retired from coaching after the support boat that he piloted in October 2015 ran into a rowing boat, injuring two of the student rowers. Maritime New Zealand laid charges in connection with the crash.

Strachan celebrated his 100th birthday on 17 August 2023. Rowing New Zealand compiled a number of tributes from the rowing community. For example, Hamish Bond said:

Fred is an encyclopedia of rowing knowledge, constantly producing random printouts and photocopies of East German training philosophies. If it was written, he had read it.

== Honorary roles and awards ==
Strachan was president of Rowing New Zealand from 1985 to 1990, in which year he was awarded life membership. He is vice-patron of Rowing New Zealand. In the 1991 New Year Honours, he was awarded a Queen's Service Medal (QSM) for community service. At the 2005 Halberg Awards, Strachan was awarded a lifetime achievement award. In 2019, he was awarded the Sir Don Rowlands Medal by the New Zealand Rowing Association. Strachan received the lifetime achievement award at the 2022 New Zealand Sport and Recreation Awards.

== Private life ==
Strachan was known as a "confirmed bachelor". After Kate Gow, a member of the Auckland University Women’s Rowing Club, moved to Christchurch, she got together with Strachan. They married in the 1970s at the St Joseph's Cathedral in Dunedin. Strachan lives in Twizel, which is close to Lake Ruataniwha.
