= Muhammed Taher Pasha =

Egyptian doctor of political science (1879–1970)

Muhammed Taher Pasha (1897 – 29 January 1970; Arabic: محمد طاهر باشا) was an Egyptian doctor of political science, originally of Turkish origin, and the founder of the Mediterranean Games. He was the chairman of the Egyptian Olympic Committee and also a member of the Executive Commission of the International Olympic Committee from 1952 to 1957.

Taher Pasha convinced the National Olympic Committees of the Mediterranean countries 1948 Summer Olympics held in London to create the Mediterranean Games.

== Taher Pasha Trophy ==
In 1950, he gifted the Taher Pasha Trophy to the International Olympic Committee. The trophy is reserved for amateur athletes, regardless whether or not they compete in the Olympic Games, whose general merits or career appear to warrant a particular distinction in the name of the Olympic ideals. Recipients of the trophy, which is not necessarily awarded every year, have included:

- 1951: Paul Anspach (1882–1981), Belgian fencer
- 1952: Fanny Blankers-Koen, (1918–2004), Dutch athlete
- 1953: Adhemar da Silva (1927–2001), Brazilian triple jumper
- 1954: Adolphe Jauréguy (1898–1977), French rugby union player
- 1955: Roger Bannister (1929–2018), English middle-distance athlete
- 1956: Gert Fredriksson (1919–2006), Swedish sprint canoeist
- 1957: John Landy (1930–2022), Australian middle-distance runner
- 1960: Joaquín Blume (1933–1959), Spanish gymnast (posthumous award)
- 1961: van de Wattyne, Belgian athlete
- 1962: Phil Coleman (born 1931), American middle- and long-distance runner
- 1963:

- Iolanda Balaș (1936–2016), Romanian athlete
- Sjoukje Dijkstra (born 1942), Dutch figure skater

- 1965: Sixten Jernberg (1929–2012), Swedish cross-country skier
- 1966: Rodrigo de Castro Pereira (1887–1983), Portuguese tennis player
- 1967: Eugenio Monti (1928–2003), Italian bobsledder
- 1971: New Zealand eight, the rowing team that won the eight event at the 1971 European Rowing Championships

== Notes ==
Sporting positions
Preceded by Prince Isma'il Daoud	President of the Egyptian Olympic Committee; 1946–1954	Succeeded by Abdel Rahman Amin
