= Tom Just =

New Zealand rower

Personal information
- Birth name: Thomas Weymess Just
- Nationality: New Zealand
- Born: 23 January 1942 (age 83); Wellington, New Zealand
- Height: 188 cm (6 ft 2 in)
- Weight: 85 kg (187 lb)

Sport
- Club: Wellington Rowing Club

Thomas Weymess Just (born 23 January 1942) is a New Zealand rower.

Just was born in 1942 in Wellington, New Zealand. He represented New Zealand at the 1968 Summer Olympics. He is listed as New Zealand Olympian athlete number 231 by the New Zealand Olympic Committee. He is a life member of the Wellington Rowing Club.
