= John Gibbons (rower) =

New Zealand rower (born 1943)

Personal information
- Nationality: New Zealand
- Born: John Greville Gibbons; 19 June 1943 (age 82) Wellington, New Zealand
- Height: 193 cm (6 ft 4 in)
- Weight: 96 kg (212 lb)

John Greville Gibbons (born 19 June 1943) is a New Zealand rower.

Gibbons was born in 1943 in Wellington, New Zealand. His father was Gerald Gibbons. In April 1968, he was on one of the boats that rescued survivors of the sinking of TEV Wahine.

A few months later, Gibbons represented New Zealand at the 1968 Summer Olympics. He is listed as New Zealand Olympian athlete number 174 by the New Zealand Olympic Committee. In 1968, he was a student at the Victoria University of Wellington and while in Mexico at the Summer Olympics, he was awarded VUW Sportsman of the Year, which was presented to his father.
