= Colin Johnstone =

New Zealand rower (1921–1991)

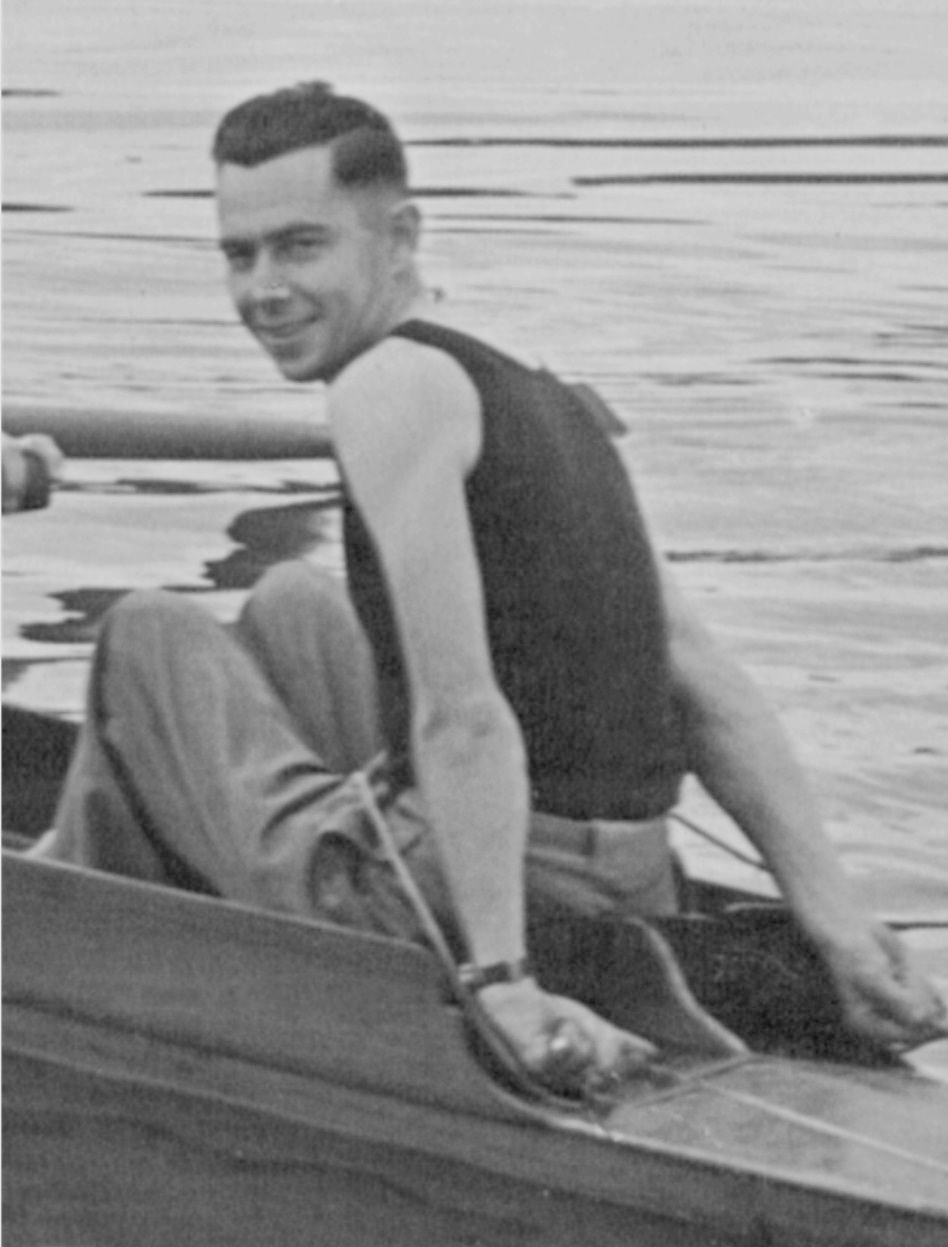

Personal information
- Full name: Colin Gordon Johnstone
- Born: 14 September 1921 Waipukurau, New Zealand
- Died: 10 November 1991 (aged 70) Whanganui, New Zealand

Sport
- Sport: Rowing
- Club: Aramoho Boating Club, Whanganui
Medal record
Representing New Zealand
British Empire Games
Gold medal – first place	1950 Auckland	Coxed four

Colin Gordon Johnstone (14 September 1921 – 10 November 1991) was a New Zealand rowing coxswain who mostly competed in coxed fours. He won a gold medal at the 1950 British Empire Games, and competed at the 1952 and 1956 Summer Olympics.
