= Chris Nilsson =

New Zealand rower

Personal information
- Birth name: Christopher William Bunny Nilsson
- Nationality: New Zealand
- Born: 16 February 1947 (age 78); Hastings, New Zealand
- Height: 185 cm (6 ft 1 in)

Christopher William Bunny Nilsson (born 16 February 1947) is a New Zealand rower.

Nilsson was born in 1947 in Hastings, New Zealand. He represented New Zealand at the 1972 Summer Olympics. He is listed as New Zealand Olympian athlete number 299 by the New Zealand Olympic Committee. He later worked as a rowing coach. He worked as a coach for the University of Oxford and then Princeton University. This was followed from 2004 to 2008 as coach in the New Zealand high performance rowing programme. Nilsson claims that he was driven out of the sport by fellow 1972 Summer Olympics rower, highly successful but controversial coach Dick Tonks. When Tonks was appointed head coach, Nilsson resigned and went to the University of Cambridge.
