= Gil Cawood =

New Zealand rower (1939–2022)

Personal information
- Born: Gilbert Mervyn Cawood; 4 December 1939 Hamilton, New Zealand
- Died: 28 August 2022 (aged 82) Hamilton, New Zealand
- Height: 1.83 m (6 ft 0 in)
- Weight: 83 kg (183 lb)

Sport
- Country: New Zealand
- Sport: Rowing
- Club: Waikato Rowing Club
Medal record
Men's rowing
Representing New Zealand
World Rowing Championships
Bronze medal – third place	1970 St. Catharines	Eight

Gilbert Mervyn Cawood (4 December 1939 – 28 August 2022) was a New Zealand rower.

Cawood was born in 1939 in Hamilton, New Zealand. He was a foundation member of the Waikato Rowing Club. He represented New Zealand at the 1968 Summer Olympics. He is listed as New Zealand Olympian athlete number 218 by the New Zealand Olympic Committee. At the 1970 World Rowing Championships in St. Catharines in Canada, he won a bronze medal with the eight. He died at Waikato Hospital in Hamilton, on 28 August 2022, at the age of 82.
