= Donald Leach (rower) =

New Zealand rower (born 1980)

Personal information
- Born: Donald Charles Leach; 5 November 1980 (age 45) Christchurch, New Zealand
- Height: 197 cm (6 ft 6 in)
- Weight: 94 kg (207 lb)

Sport
- Sport: Rowing

Donald Charles "Don" Leach (born 5 November 1980) is a New Zealand rower. He is a renowned bush pilot specialising in riverbed landings up the Rangitata River in the central South Island.

Leach was born in Christchurch. He represented New Zealand in the coxless four at the 2004 Summer Olympics at Athens, where the team came fifth.
