= New Zealand at the 1930 British Empire Games =

- CGF code: NZL
- CGA: New Zealand Olympic and British Empire Games Association
- Website: www.olympic.org.nz

in Hamilton, Ontario, Canada
- Competitors: 22
- Flag bearers: Opening: Stan Lay; Closing:
- Officials: 3
- Medals Ranked 4th: Gold 3 Silver 4 Bronze 2 Total 9

British Empire Games appearances
- 1930; 1934; 1938; 1950; 1954; 1958; 1962; 1966; 1970; 1974; 1978; 1982; 1986; 1990; 1994; 1998; 2002; 2006; 2010; 2014; 2018; 2022; 2026; 2030

New Zealand at the 1930 British Empire Games was represented by a team of 22 competitors and three officials. Team selection for the Games in Hamilton, Ontario, Canada, was the responsibility of the New Zealand Olympic and British Empire Games Association. New Zealand's flagbearer at the opening ceremony was Stan Lay.

These were the first British Empire Games, although in 1911 there was an Empire sports competition at the Festival of Empire in London. New Zealand has competed in every games since.

== Medal tables ==
| Medal | Name | Sport | Event |
|---|---|---|---|
| Gold | Stan Lay | Athletics | Men's javelin throw |
| Gold | Bill Savidan | Athletics | Men's 6 miles |
| Gold | Mick Brough; Arthur Eastwood (cox); Jack Macdonald; Bert Sandos; Ben Waters | Rowing | Men's coxed four |
| Silver | William Fielding; Peter McWhannell | Lawn bowls | Men's pair |
| Silver | Mick Brough; Arthur Eastwood (cox); John Gilby; Jack Macdonald; Vic Olsson; Bert Sandos; Charles Saunders; Rangi Thompson; Ben Waters | Rowing | Men's eight |
| Silver | Gordon Bridson | Swimming | Men's 1500 yards freestyle |
| Silver | Gordon Bridson | Swimming | Men's 440 yards freestyle |
| Bronze | William Fielding | Lawn bowls | Men's singles |
| Bronze | Berry Johnson; Vic Olsson; Alexander Ross; Charles Saunders | Rowing | Men's coxless four |

Medals by sport
| Sport | Gold medal | Silver medal | Bronze medal | Total |
| Athletics | 2 | 0 | 0 | 2 |
| Rowing | 1 | 1 | 1 | 3 |
| Swimming | 0 | 2 | 0 | 2 |
| Lawn bowls | 0 | 1 | 1 | 2 |
| Total | 3 | 4 | 2 | 9 |

Medals by gender
| Gender | Gold medal | Silver medal | Bronze medal | Total |
| Male | 3 | 4 | 2 | 9 |
| Female | 0 | 0 | 0 | 0 |
| Total | 3 | 4 | 2 | 9 |

== Competitors ==
The following table lists the number of New Zealand competitors participating at the Games per sport/discipline.

| Sport | Men | Women | Total |
|---|---|---|---|
| Athletics | 4 | —N/a | 4 |
| Diving | 1 | 0 | 1 |
| Lawn bowls | 4 | —N/a | 4 |
| Rowing | 11 | —N/a | 11 |
| Swimming | 1 | 1 | 2 |
| Total | 21 | 1 | 22 |

== Athletics ==
=== Track ===
| Athlete | Event | Heat | | Final | |
| Athlete | Event | Result | Rank (Note: Ranks given are within the heat) | Result | Rank |
|---|---|---|---|---|---|
| Allan Elliot | Men's 100 yards | 9.7 | 3 | did not advance | |
| Allan Elliot | Men's 220 yards | | 3 | did not advance | |
| Bill Savidan | Men's 3 miles | —N/a | | did not finish | |
| Bill Savidan | Men's 6 miles | —N/a | | 30:49.6 | 1st place, gold medalist(s) |

=== Field ===
| Athlete | Event | Final | |
| Athlete | Event | Result | Rank |
|---|---|---|---|
| Ossie Johnson | Men's triple jump | 43 ft 2 in (13.16 m) | 6 |
| Stan Lay | Men's javelin throw | 207 ft 1 1/2 in (63.13 m) | 1st place, gold medalist(s) |

== Diving ==
| Athlete | Event | Final | |
| Athlete | Event | Points | Rank |
|---|---|---|---|
| Roy Calder | Men's springboard | | 4 |

== Lawn bowls ==
| Athlete | Event | Round robin | | | | Rank |
| Athlete | Event | Opposition Score | Opposition Score | Opposition Score | Opposition Score | Rank |
|---|---|---|---|---|---|---|
| William Fielding | Men's singles | Reid (CAN); W 21 – 20 | Colquhoun (ENG); L 19 – 21 | Thomas (SAF); L 15 – 21 | —N/a | 3rd place, bronze medalist(s) |
| William Fielding; Peter McWhannell | Men's pairs | England; L 13 – 20 | South Africa; W 21 – 13 | Canada; W 19 – 16 | —N/a | 2nd place, silver medalist(s) |
| William Fielding; Peter McWhannell; Harold Frost; Edward Leach | Men's four | Scotland; L 11 – 20 | England; L 9 – 29 | Canada; W 27 – 20 | South Africa; L 18 – 19 | 5 |

== Rowing ==
| Athlete | Event | Rank |
|---|---|---|
| Arthur Eastwood (cox); Bert Sandos; Ben Waters; Mick Brough; Jack Macdonald | Men's coxed four | 1st place, gold medalist(s) |
| Alex Ross; Charles Saunders; Berry Johnson; Vic Olsson | Men's coxless four | 3rd place, bronze medalist(s) |
| Arthur Eastwood (cox); Bert Sandos; Charles Saunders; Ben Waters; Mick Brough; Rangi Thompson; John Gilby; Jack Macdonald; Vic Olsson | Men's eight | 2nd place, silver medalist(s) |

== Swimming ==
| Athlete | Event | Final | |
| Athlete | Event | Result | Rank |
|---|---|---|---|
| Gordon Bridson | Men's 440 yards freestyle | 4:45.8 | 2nd place, silver medalist(s) |
| Gordon Bridson | Men's 1500 yards freestyle | 19:41.0 | 2nd place, silver medalist(s) |
| Gladys Pidgeon | Women's 200 yards breaststroke | | 6 |

== Officials ==
- Team manager – Rex Hobbs
- Chaperone – Jane Pidgeon
- Rowing coach – Harry Ayres

== See also ==
- New Zealand Olympic Committee
- New Zealand at the Commonwealth Games
- New Zealand at the 1928 Summer Olympics
- New Zealand at the 1932 Summer Olympics
