= Rowing at the 1930 British Empire Games =

- Venue: Burlington Bay
- Location: Hamilton, Ontario, Canada
- Dates: 16 – 23 August 1930

At the 1930 British Empire Games, the rowing competition featured six events for men only (one of which was presumed to be a demonstration event). In the double sculls event, only Canada was represented, so the organisers simply invited a couple of crews from the United States to provide some opposition. The events were held at Burlington Bay.

Bobby Pearce won the single sculls. Pearce also won the quarter mile dash, also referred to as the canoe championships but it is not clear if this was a medal event or solely a demonstration event. A Canoe event was held between Canada and the United States on the same day.

The four and eight gold medal winning England crews were represented by the London Rowing Club, while Canada's coxed four was represented by McGill University Rowing Club and the coxless four by Halifax RC.

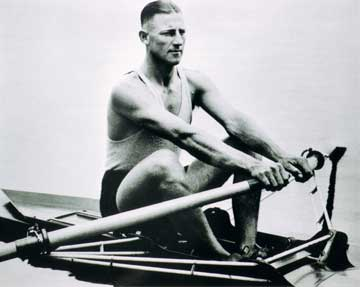
Bobby Pearce

== Medal table ==
* Host nation (Canada)

Medals won by nation with totals, ranked by number of golds—sortable
Rank	Nation	Gold	Silver	Bronze	Total
1	England (ENG)	2	1	1	4
2	Canada (CAN)*	1	2	1	4
3	New Zealand (NZL)	1	1	1	3
4	Australia (AUS)	1	0	0	1
5	British Guiana (BGU)	0	0	1	1
Totals (5 entries)		5	4	4	13

== Medal summary ==
Event	Gold		Silver		Bronze	
Single sculls	Bobby Pearce (AUS)	8:33sec	Jack Beresford (ENG)	10 lengths	Fred Bradley (ENG)	
Double sculls	Elswood Bole and Bob Richards (CAN)	7:48	Only one pair entered		Only one pair entered	
Coxless four	England (London RC); Francis Fitzwilliams; Arthur Harby; Hugh Edwards; Humphrey Boardman	7:05	Canada (Halifax RC); Jerry Calnan; Jim Flemming; Albert Bellew; Henry Pelham	+2 lgths	New Zealand; Berry Johnson; Vic Olsson; Alex Ross; Charley Saunders	
Coxed four	New Zealand; Mick Brough; Jack Macdonald; Ben Waters; Bert Sandos; Arthur Eastwood	8:02	Canada (McGill RC); David Lorne Gales; R. S. Evans; J. A. Butler; Hugh McCuaig; A. Miles	+2 lgths	British Guiana; Joecelyn Matthews; Francis Gomes; Pelham Bayley; Edward Gonsalves; John Jardine	
Eights	England (London RC); Arthur Harby; Edgar Howitt; Francis Fitzwilliams; Humphrey Boardman; Hugh Edwards; Justin Brown; Geoffrey Crawford; Roger Close-Brooks; Terence O'Brien	6:37	New Zealand; Arthur Eastwood; Bert Sandos; Charley Saunders; Ben Waters; Mick Brough; Rangi Thompson; John Gilby; Jack Macdonald; Vic Olsson	+0.75 lgths	Canada; Albert Taylor; Don Boal; Earl Eastwood; Harry Fry; Joseph Zabinsky; Joseph Bowkes; Les MacDonald; William Moore; William Thoburn	+4 lgths

- (+) Demonstration event
