= Ben Waters =

New Zealand rower and rugby union footballer

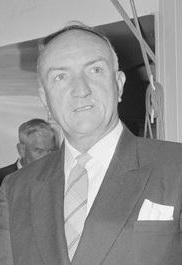
- Waters in 1960

Personal information
- Born: Edward Arthur Waters; 13 October 1907 Marton, New Zealand
- Died: 30 October 1992 (aged 85)
- Weight: 76 kg (168 lb)
- Spouse: Kathleen Mary Dobson (m. 1933; died 1973)

Sport
- Country: New Zealand
- Sport: Rowing
- Club: Hamilton Rowing Club
Medal record
Men's rowing
Representing New Zealand
British Empire Games
| Gold medal – first place | 1930 Hamilton | Coxed four |
| Silver medal – second place | 1930 Hamilton | Eight |

Rugby union career
- Position: Forward
Provincial / State sides
| Years | Team | Apps | (Points) |
| 1929 | Waikato | 2 | (0) |

Edward Arthur "Ben" Waters (13 October 1907 – 30 October 1992) was a New Zealand rower who won two medals at the 1930 British Empire Games. He later unsuccessfully stood as a Labour parliamentary candidate at several elections.

== Early life and family ==
Born at Marton on 13 October 1907, Waters was the son of Thomas Edward Waters and Grace Hannah Eliza Waters (née Mainwaring). He married Kathleen Mary Dobson on 12 August 1933, and the couple went on to have five children.

== Sporting career ==
=== Rowing ===
A member of the Hamilton Rowing Club, Waters began rowing as a 17-year-old. In 1929 he was a member of the Hamilton four that won the national championship. In March of the following year, he participated in a trial race for selection of the New Zealand team to compete at the 1930 British Empire Games in Hamilton, Ontario, but was not initially chosen for the 12-man squad. However, he was included in the final squad selected in late June, and competed in both the men's eight and coxed four at the 1930 Empire Games. He won a gold medal in the coxed four, alongside Mick Brough, Jack Macdonald, Bert Sandos, and Arthur Eastwood (cox), and a silver medal in the eights, finishing three-quarters of a boat length behind the victorious English crew.

Selected for the New Zealand rowing squad to compete at the 1932 Summer Olympics in Los Angeles, Waters was unable to afford to attend.

Waters later served as chairman of the Hamilton Rowing Club for almost 25 years.

=== Other sports ===
Waters played two rugby union matches as a forward at a provincial level for Waikato in 1929, and was later a Waikato rugby administrator. He also played representative cricket and tennis.

== Politics ==
Waters was a carpenter and union organiser, and was described as an "incisive critic of National Party policy". During World War II he was serving as a leading aircraftman in the Royal New Zealand Air Force when he stood as the Labour Party candidate for the Waitomo electorate at the 1943 general election. He finished second, 1881 votes behind the National Party incumbent, Walter Broadfoot.

At the 1946 general election, Waters contested the newly created Piako electorate, losing by 511 votes to Stan Goosman of the National Party. Waters stood for Labour in the Hamilton electorate at the 1951 election, but was defeated by National's incumbent MP, Hilda Ross, by 2252 votes. In 1954, Waters again stood against Ross in Hamilton, reducing her majority to 1430. Following Ross's death in 1959, Waters contested the resulting by-election, but lost to Lance Adams-Schneider from National by 2988 votes.

== Later life and death ==
Waters became a builder and building supervisor. He lived in retirement in Hamilton, and was predeceased by his wife, Kathleen, in 1973. Waters himself died on 30 October 1992, and he was buried at Hamilton East Cemetery.
