= Vic Olsson =

New Zealand rower (1903–1990)

Personal information
- Born: Andre Victor Olsson; 28 August 1903 Picton, New Zealand
- Died: 3 July 1990 (aged 86)
- Occupation: Carpenter
- Height: 1.83 m (6 ft)
- Weight: 81 kg (178 lb)
- Spouse: Ivy Ethel Julia Chapman (m. 1935; died 1968)

Sport
- Country: New Zealand
- Sport: Rowing
- Club: Picton Rowing Club
Medal record
Men's rowing
Representing New Zealand
British Empire Games
Silver medal – second place	1930 Hamilton	Eights
Bronze medal – third place	1930 Hamilton	Coxless Fours

Andre Victor Olsson (28 August 1903 – 3 July 1990) was a New Zealand rower who won two medals representing his country at the 1930 British Empire Games.

== Early life and family ==
Born in Picton on 28 August 1903, Olsson was the son of Victor Olsson and Christina Olsson (née McKay). He married Ivy Ethel Julia Chapman on 31 January 1935.

== Rowing ==
A member of the Picton Rowing Club, Olsson was described as "a rower of tremendous strength and stamina". He was selected in the New Zealand eight for the 1928 Olympic Games, but they did not travel because of insufficient funds.

Competing for New Zealand at the 1930 British Empire Games in Hamilton, Ontario, he won a silver medal as a member of the men's eight that lost to the English crew by three-quarters of a length. Also at the Hamilton games, he won the bronze medal in the coxless four, alongside Berry Johnson, Alex Ross and Charles Saunders.

In April 1932, Olsson was named in the New Zealand team to compete at the Olympic Games in Los Angeles. However, the following month he withdrew, and was replaced by Noel Pope.

== Death ==
Olsson died on 3 July 1990, and he was buried at Picton Cemetery.
