= Mick Brough =

New Zealand rower

Personal information
- Born: Frank Brough; 8 October 1899 Dunedin, New Zealand
- Died: 25 October 1960 (aged 61) Dunedin, New Zealand
- Height: 1.87 m (6 ft 1 1/2 in)
- Weight: 80 kg (176 lb)
- Spouse: Elizabeth Marjorie Wylie (m. 1930)

Sport
- Country: New Zealand
- Sport: Rowing
- Club: Otago Rowing Club
Medal record
Men's rowing
Representing New Zealand
British Empire Games
Gold medal – first place	1930 Hamilton	Coxed Fours
Silver medal – second place	1930 Hamilton	Eights

Frank "Mick" Brough (8 October 1899 – 25 October 1960) was a New Zealand rower who won two medals at the 1930 British Empire Games.

== Early life and family ==
Born in Dunedin on 8 October 1899, Brough was the son of William John Brough and Agnes Auchterlonie Brough (née Farquharson). On 26 March 1930, he married Elizabeth Marjorie Wylie at All Saints' Church in Dunedin.

== Rowing ==
A member of the Otago Rowing Club, Brough was described as "powerfully muscled". He was selected in the New Zealand eight for the 1928 Olympic Games, but they did not travel because of insufficient funds. He represented New Zealand at the 1930 British Empire Games in Hamilton, Ontario, and was a member of the coxed four, which included Jack Macdonald, Ben Waters, Bert Sandos, and Arthur Eastwood (coxswain), that won the gold medal. He also stroked the eight that won the silver medal, three-quarters of a boat length behind the victorious English crew.

== Death ==
Brough died in Dunedin on 25 October 1960, and his ashes were buried at Andersons Bay Cemetery.
