= Rowing at the 1932 Summer Olympics – Men's coxed four =

Men's coxed four at the Games of the X Olympiad
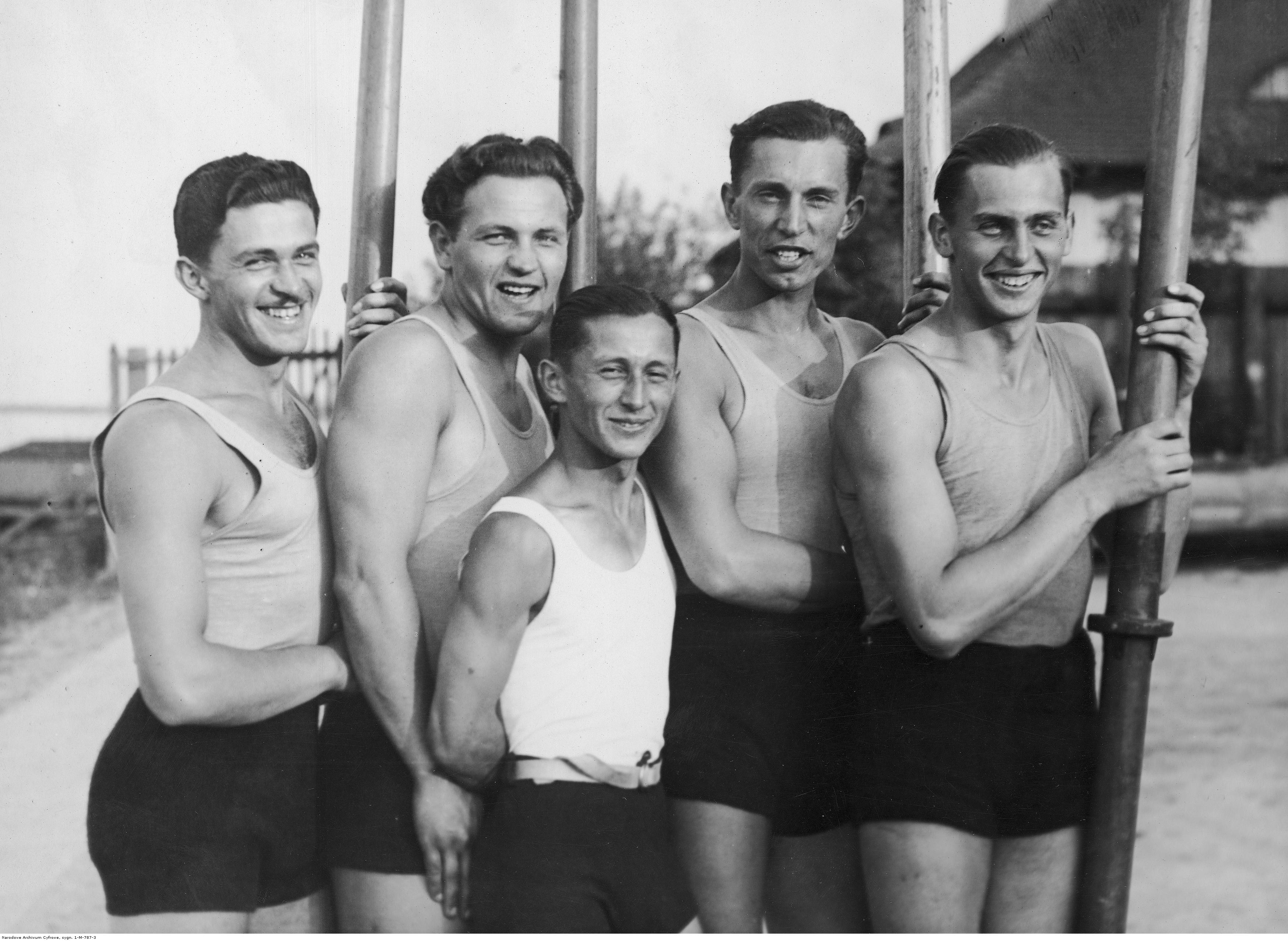
- Polish bronze medal winners
- Venue: Long Beach Marine Stadium
- Dates: 10–13 August 1932
- Competitors: 35 from 7 nations
- Winning time: 7:19.0

Medalists
1st place, gold medalist(s)		Germany: Hans Eller; Horst Hoeck; Walter Meyer; Carlheinz Neumann; Joachim Spremberg
2nd place, silver medalist(s)		Italy: Riccardo Divora; Bruno Parovel; Giovanni Plazzer; Guerrino Scher; Bruno Vattovaz
3rd place, bronze medalist(s)		Poland: Jerzy Braun; Edward Kobyliński; Jerzy Skolimowski; Janusz Ślązak; Stanisław Urban

The men's coxed four competition at the 1932 Summer Olympics in Los Angeles took place at the Long Beach Marine Stadium. It was held from 10 to 13 August. There were 7 boats (35 competitors) from 7 nations, with each nation limited to a single boat in the event. The event was won by Germany, the nation's first victory in the event since 1912 and third overall (most among nations and a mark that no other nation achieved before the discontinuance of the event after the 1992 Games). Defending champions Italy came within 0.2 seconds of repeating, with Germany passing them at the very end of the final. Poland won its second consecutive bronze medal.

== Background ==
This was the sixth appearance of the event. Rowing had been on the programme in 1896 but was cancelled due to bad weather. The coxed four was one of the four initial events introduced in 1900. It was not held in 1904 or 1908, but was held at every Games from 1912 to 1992 when it (along with the men's coxed pair) was replaced with the men's lightweight double sculls and men's lightweight coxless four.

Five of the 11 nations from the 1928 Games returned: gold medallists Italy, bronze medallists Poland, fourth-place finishers Germany, seventh-place finishers the United States, and ninth-place finishers Japan. Italy and Switzerland (the silver medallists in 1928) had been the strongest teams in the event for most of the last decade; with Switzerland not having a crew in Los Angeles, Italy was favoured. The Italians had won the European championships five of the last six times, coming in second to Denmark (another nation with no crew competing at the Games) the one remaining time.

New Zealand made its debut in the event. Germany and the United States both made their fourth appearance, matching the absent Belgium and France for most among nations to that point.

== Competition format ==
The coxed four event featured five-person boats, with four rowers and a coxswain. It was a sweep rowing event, with the rowers each having one oar (and thus each rowing on one side). The competition used the 2000 metres distance that became standard at the 1912 Olympics and which has been used ever since except at the 1948 Games.

With fewer boats and a wider course, the competition went from a seven-round tournament in 1928 to only three rounds in 1932. There were two main rounds (semifinals and a final) along with a repechage.

- There were two semifinal heats, with 3 and 4 boats each. The winner of each heat advanced directly to the final, while the 2nd and 3rd placed boats in each heat competed in the repechage.
- There was a single repechage heat, with 4 boats. The top two boats advanced to the final.
- There was a single final, with 4 boats, to determine the medals and 4th place.

== Schedule ==
Date	Time	Round
Wednesday, 10 August 1932	15:00	Semifinals
Thursday, 11 August 1932		Repechage
Saturday, 13 August 1932	15:00	Final

== Results ==
=== Semifinals ===
First boat of each heat qualified for the final, remainder go to repechage.

==== Semifinal 1 ====
Rank	Rowers	Coxswain	Nation	Time	Notes
1	Riccardo Divora; Bruno Parovel; Giovanni Plazzer; Bruno Vattovaz	Guerrino Scher	Italy	7:06.0	Q
2	Hans Eller; Horst Hoeck; Walter Meyer; Joachim Spremberg	Carlheinz Neumann	Germany	7:09.2	R
3	Somers Cox; Noel Pope; Charles Saunders; John Solomon	Delmont Gullery	New Zealand	7:19.6	R
4	João Francisco de Castro; Durval Lima; Osório Pereira; Olivério Popovitch	Américo Fernandes	Brazil	7:29.4	

==== Semifinal 2 ====
Rank	Rowers	Coxswain	Nation	Time	Notes
1	Jerzy Braun; Edward Kobyliński; Janusz Ślązak; Stanisław Urban	Jerzy Skolimowski	Poland	7:04.2	Q
2	Francis English; Harry Grossmiller; Charles Drueding; Edward Marshall	Thomas Mack	United States	7:06.0	R
3	Rokuro Takahashi; Norio Ban; Umetaro Shibata; Daikichi Suzuki	Shokichi Nanba	Japan	7:16.8	R

=== Repechage ===
First two qualify to the final.

Rank	Rowers	Coxswain	Nation	Time	Notes
1	Somers Cox; Noel Pope; Charles Saunders; John Solomon	Delmont Gullery	New Zealand	7:38.2	Q
2	Hans Eller; Horst Hoeck; Walter Meyer; Joachim Spremberg	Carlheinz Neumann	Germany	7:38.8	Q
3	Francis English; Harry Grossmiller; Charles Drueding; Edward Marshall	Thomas Mack	United States	7:41.6	
4	Rokuro Takahashi; Norio Ban; Umetaro Shibata; Daikichi Suzuki	Shokichi Nanba	Japan	7:47.0	

=== Final ===
Rank	Rowers	Coxswain	Nation	Time	Notes
1st place, gold medalist(s)	Hans Eller; Horst Hoeck; Walter Meyer; Joachim Spremberg	Carlheinz Neumann	Germany	7:19.0	
2nd place, silver medalist(s)	Riccardo Divora; Bruno Parovel; Giovanni Plazzer; Bruno Vattovaz	Guerrino Scher	Italy	7:19.2	
3rd place, bronze medalist(s)	Jerzy Braun; Edward Kobyliński; Janusz Ślązak; Stanisław Urban	Jerzy Skolimowski	Poland	7:26.8	
4	Somers Cox; Noel Pope; Charles Saunders; John Solomon	Delmont Gullery	New Zealand	7:32.4	
