= Berry Johnson =

New Zealand rower (1906–1985)

Personal information
- Born: George Berry Melton Johnson; 6 March 1906 Christchurch, New Zealand
- Died: 28 August 1985 (aged 79) Christchurch, New Zealand
- Occupation: Accountant
- Height: 1.82 m (5 ft 11 1/2 in)
- Weight: 75 kg (166 lb)
- Spouse: Doreen Annie Greene (m. 1934; died 1972)

Sport
- Country: New Zealand
- Sport: Rowing
- Club: Otago Rowing Club
Medal record
Men's rowing
Representing New Zealand
British Empire Games
Bronze medal – third place	1930 Hamilton	Coxless Fours

George Berry Melton Johnson (6 March 1906 – 28 August 1985) was a New Zealand rower who represented his country at the 1930 British Empire Games.

== Early life and family ==
Born in Christchurch on 6 March 1906, Johnson was the son of Harry Melton Johnson, a cabinetmaker, and Maggie Smart Johnson (née Mauchlin). On 31 March 1934, he married Doreen Annie Greene at Highfield Presbyterian Church, Timaru.

== Rowing ==
A member of the Otago Rowing Club, Johnson was a member of the New Zealand coxless four that competed at the 1930 British Empire Games in Hamilton, Ontario. The crew, which included Vic Olsson, Alex Ross and Charles Saunders, won the bronze medal.

== Later life and death ==
Johnson worked as an accountant. During World War II, he served as a second lieutenant with the 3rd Field Regiment, New Zealand Artillery. His wife died in Dunedin on 20 May 1972. Johnson himself died in Christchurch on 28 August 1985, and his ashes were buried at Andersons Bay Cemetery, Dunedin, with those of his wife.
