= Daikichi =

- Gender: Male

Origin
- Origin: Japanese
- Meaning: Different meanings depending on the kanji used

Daikichi (written: 大吉) is a masculine Japanese given name. Notable people with the name include:

- Asabenkei Daikichi (朝弁慶 大吉; born 1989), Japanese sumo wrestler
- Daikichi Hakata (博多 大吉; born 1971), Japanese comedian
- Daikichi Irokawa (色川 大吉; 1925–2021), Japanese historian
- Daikichi Suzuki (鈴木 大吉), Japanese rower
- Daikichi Sugawara (菅原 大吉), Japanese actor

== Fictional characters ==
- Daikichi Kawachi (河地 大吉), protagonist of the manga series Bunny Drop
