= Victor Olson =

Victor Olson may refer to:

- Victor Olson, character in Bitten (TV series)
- Victor Olson (politician), colleague of Gary Doer
- Victor Olson (1924-2007), illustrator

== See also ==
- Vic Olsson
