= Geoffrey Crawford =

Geoffrey Crawford may refer to:

- Geoffrey W. Crawford (born 1954), American judge in Vermont
- Geoffrey Crawford (rower) (1904–1942), English rower
- Geoff Crawford (1916–1998), Australian politician
- Ravage (Marvel Comics), the alter ego of a fictional professor named Geoffrey Crawford
