= Frederick Bradley =

Frederick Bradley may refer to:

- Frederick Henry Bradley (1876–1943), English recipient of the Victoria Cross
- Frederick Gordon Bradley (1886–1966), Canadian and Dominion of Newfoundland politician
- Frederick Van Ness Bradley (1898–1947), American politician from Michigan
- Fred Bradley (baseball) (1920–2012), American baseball player
- Frederick Deryl Bradley (born 1949), Canadian politician in Alberta
- Fred Bradley (rower) (1908–?), British rower
- Fred Bradley (Kentucky politician) (1931–2016), American politician from Kentucky

== See also ==
- Freddie Bradley (born 1970), American football player
- Frederick Bradlee (1892–1970), American football player
