= Arthur Harby =

English rower

Personal information
- Nationality: Brttish (English)
- Born: 29 August 1906 Dover, England
- Died: 27 October 1989 (aged 83) Dover, England

Sport
- Sport: Rowing
- Event: Coxless Four
- Club: London RC
Medal record
Men's Rowing
Representing England
British Empire Games
Gold medal – first place	1930 Hamilton	Coxless Four
Gold medal – first place	1930 Hamilton	Eights

Arthur James Harby (1906–1989) was an English rower.

== Biography ==
Harby competed for the 1930 English team in the coxless four at the 1930 British Empire Games and won a gold medal with Francis Fitzwilliams, Humphrey Boardman and Hugh Edwards and won a second gold medal as part of the eight.

He was an engineer at the time of the 1930 Games.
