= Leon MacDonald =

NZ international rugby union player

- Born: Leon Raymond MacDonald; 21 December 1977 (age 48) Blenheim, New Zealand
- Height: 1.81 m (5 ft 11 1/2 in)
- Weight: 96 kg (212 lb)
- School: Marlborough Boys' College
- Notable relative(s): Jack Macdonald; Lynne Macdonald; Hoani MacDonald; Jamie Joseph

Rugby union career
- Position(s): Fullback, Centre, First five-eighth
Senior career
Years	Team	Apps	(Points)
1994–1996	Marlborough	33	(62)
1996–2006	Canterbury	37	(48)
1997–2009	Crusaders	122	(327)
1998	Chiefs	5	(23)
2004	Yamaha Jubilo		
2009–2010	Kintetsu Liners		
- Correct as of 3 May 2025
International career
Years	Team	Apps	(Points)
1997	New Zealand Colts	5	(2)
1998–2005	New Zealand Māori	4	(15)
2000–2008	New Zealand	56	(141)
- Correct as of 23 November 2018
Coaching career
- Years: Team
- 2010–2015: Tasman (assistant)
- 2016–2018: Tasman
- 2017: Crusaders (assistant)
- 2019–2023: Blues
- 2024: New Zealand (assistant)
- 2025: Western Force (consultant)
- 2025-: Yokohama Canon Eagles
- Correct as of 3 May 2025

Leon Raymond MacDonald (born 21 December 1977) is a retired New Zealand rugby union footballer, and former head coach for the Auckland Blues rugby team, who played 56 tests for the national team, the All Blacks. He played as a first five-eighth (fly-half), centre, and fullback. He is currently a coaching consultant with the Western Force.

== Career ==
Born in Blenheim, MacDonald made his provincial debut for Marlborough against Buller in 1994. He played 122 matches for the Crusaders and seven for the Chiefs in the Super 14, and played for Canterbury in the National Provincial Championship. He was a prodigious goal kicker. He is rare among New Zealand exported players, because he played even better after his return from Japan. In 2008, Sky Sport's Reunion awarded him the Crusader's MVP title for their Super 14 title-winning season.

He played for Burnside in the Christchurch premier competition. He made his All Blacks debut age 22, versus Scotland in 2000. He scored a total of 141 test points (14 tries, 25 conversions, 7 penalties) in the 56 tests he played. He has also appeared for New Zealand Māori, playing three games and scoring 10 points, including the winning try against the British and Irish Lions in 2005 in Hamilton.

In the 2003 Rugby World Cup, he was shifted from fullback to centre by All Blacks backline coach Robbie Deans. This proved to be a failure, and the last time he played at centre. In 2005, he was shifted to first five-eighth during the Tri-Nations to cover for the injured Daniel Carter.

=== Japan ===
In 2004 season, MacDonald played for Yamaha Jubilo in Japan. He played for Kintetsu Liners in Japan in the 2009–2010 season. In 2010 he announced his immediate retirement from rugby, after failing to recover from a long-term injury. It was also announced in 2010 that MacDonald would become an assistant coach for the Tasman Makos for the 2010 season.

=== All Blacks ===
MacDonald was appointed as an assistant coach for the All Blacks in 2024, a specialising in the attack area for the All Blacks. After five tests in the role, two of which were rugby championship games, MacDonald decided to resign and left his role due to having differing views with the head coach Scott Robertson.

=== Western Force ===
In February 2025 MacDonald was appointed as a coaching consultant to the Western Force.

== Cricket ==
He has also played for Marlborough in the Hawke Cup when they won it in the 1993–94 season.
