= Shōkichi =

- Gender: Male

Origin
- Origin: Japanese
- Meaning: Different meanings depending on the kanji used

Shōkichi, Shokichi or Shoukichi (written: 将吉, 庄吉, 昌吉, 正吉) is a masculine Japanese given name. Notable people with the name include:

- Shokichi, the stage name of Shokichi Yagi (八木 将吉; born 1985), Japanese singer, dancer, songwriter, composer and actor
- Shokichi Hata (畑 正吉; 1882–1966), Japanese sculptor
- Shokichi Iyanaga (彌永 昌吉; 1906-2006), Japanese mathematician
- Shoukichi Kina (喜納 昌吉; born 1948), Japanese rock musician and politician
- Shokichi Nanba (南波 正吉; 1911-1995), Japanese rower
- Shokichi Natsui (夏井 昇吉; 1925-2006), Japanese judoka
- Shokichi Sato (佐藤 昌吉; born 1971), Japanese football player
- Shōkichi Umeya (梅屋 庄吉; 1868–1934), Japanese film promoter and producer
- Shokichi Iwata (岩田 翔吉; born 1996), Japanese professional boxer
