= João Francisco de Castro =

Brazilian rower

Personal information
- Born: 10 December 1907; Rio de Janeiro, Brazil

Sport
- Sport: Rowing

João Francisco de Castro (born 10 December 1907, date of death unknown) was a Brazilian rower. He competed in the men's coxed four event at the 1932 Summer Olympics.
