= Olivério Popovitch =

Brazilian rower

Personal information
- Full name: Olivério Kosta Popovitch
- Nationality: Brazilian
- Born: 2 October 1911 Rio Grande do Sul, Brazil
- Died: 10 May 1973 (aged 61) Rio de Janeiro, Brazil

Sport
- Sport: Rowing

Olivério Kosta Popovitch (2 October 1911 – 10 May 1973) was a Brazilian rower. He competed in the men's coxed four event at the 1932 Summer Olympics.
