= Rokuro Takahashi =

Japanese rower

Personal information
- Nationality: Japanese
- Born: 1909

Sport
- Sport: Rowing

Rokuro Takahashi (高橋 六郎, Takahashi Rokurō; born 1909, date of death unknown) was a Japanese rower. He competed in the men's coxed four event at the 1932 Summer Olympics.
