= Joachim Spremberg =

German rower

Olympic medal record

Men's rowing
Gold medal – first place	1932 Los Angeles	Coxed four

Joachim Richard Julius Gustav Spremberg (3 November 1908 – 16 July 1975) was a German rower who competed in the 1932 Summer Olympics in Los Angeles. He won the gold medal as member of the German boat in the coxed fours competition. He was born in Berlin.
