= New Zealand at the 1932 Summer Olympics =

- IOC code: NZL
- NOC: New Zealand Olympic and British Empire Games Association
- Website: www.olympic.org.nz

in Los Angeles
- Competitors: 21 in 4 sports
- Flag bearer: Jack Macdonald (rower)
- Medals Ranked 22nd: Gold 0 Silver 1 Bronze 0 Total 1

Summer Olympics appearances (overview)
- 1908; 1912; 1920; 1924; 1928; 1932; 1936; 1948; 1952; 1956; 1960; 1964; 1968; 1972; 1976; 1980; 1984; 1988; 1992; 1996; 2000; 2004; 2008; 2012; 2016; 2020; 2024

Other related appearances
- Australasia (1908–1912)

New Zealand competed at the 1932 Summer Olympics in Los Angeles, United States. The team of 21 was New Zealand's largest to date and comprised 11 rowers, six athletes, three boxers, and one cyclist. The officials were manager Philip Rundle of Dunedin, boxing and athletic coach W. J. Heenan, and rowing coach Clarrie Healey.

An innovation was the daily one-hour radio report on the Olympics for New Zealand and Australia by the film actress from New Zealand, Nola Luxford.

== Medallists ==
Medal	Name	Sport	Event	Date
Silver	Bob Stiles; Rangi Thompson	Rowing	Men's coxless pair	13 August

== Athletics ==
Athlete	Event	Heat		Quarterfinal		Semifinal		Final	
Athlete	Event	Result	Rank (Note: Ranks given are within the heat)	Result	Rank (Note: Ranks given are within the quarterfinal)	Result	Rank (Note: Ranks given are within the semifinal)	Result	Rank
Stuart Black	Men's 200 m	23.1	3 Q	22.0	5	did not advance			
Stuart Black	Men's 400 m	49.9	4	did not advance					
Allan Elliot	Men's 100 m	10.8	2 Q	10.9	3 Q	11.0	5	did not advance	
Allan Elliot	Men's 200 m	22.2	2 Q	21.8	3 Q	21.9	5	did not advance	
Don Evans	Men's 800 m	1:56.6	4	—N/a				did not advance	
Thelma Kench	Women's 100 m	12.4	3 Q	—N/a			6	did not advance	
Jack Lovelock	Men's 1500 m	3:58.0	1 Q	—N/a				3:57.8	7
Billy Savidan	Men's 5000 m	15.08.2	5 Q	—N/a				14:49.6	4
Billy Savidan	Men's 10,000 m	—N/a						31:09.0	4

== Boxing ==
Name	Event	Round of 16	Quarterfinals	Semifinals	Final	Rank
Name	Event	Opposition Result	Opposition Result	Opposition Result	Opposition Result	Rank
Bob Purdie	Men's lightweight	Bianchini (ITA); L	Did not advance			9T
Harold Thomas	Men's welterweight	Fabbroni (ITA); L	Did not advance			9T
Bert Lowe	Men's middleweight	Bernlöhr (GER); L	Did not advance			9T

== Cycling ==
Athlete	Event	Time	Rank
Ron Foubister	Men's individual road race	2:38:42.4	23

== Rowing ==
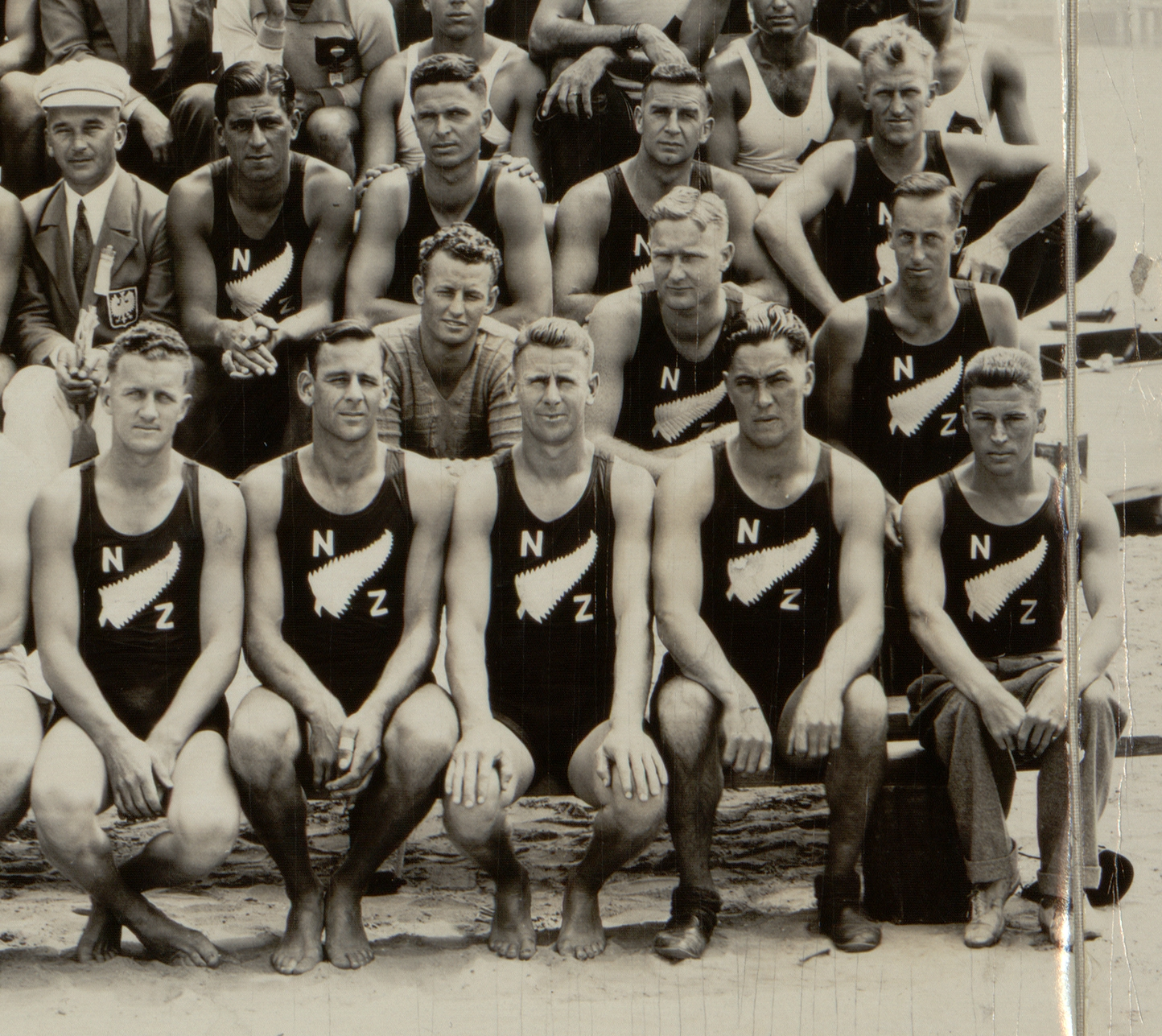
1932 Summer Olympics New Zealand rowers

In 1932, seven rowing events were held, and New Zealand entered three boats: a coxless pair, a coxed four, and an eight. The competition was for men only; women would first row at the 1976 Summer Olympics. The eight included the first two Māori Olympians, Jack Macdonald and Lawrence Woodgate-Jackson.

Athlete	Event	Heats		Repechage		Final	
Athlete	Event	Time	Rank	Time	Rank	Time	Rank
Bob Stiles; Rangi Thompson	Coxless pair	7:50.2	2 R	8:11.4	2 Q	8:02.4	2nd place, silver medalist(s)
Noel Pope; Somers Cox; Charles Saunders; John Solomon; Delmont Gullery (cox)	Coxed four	7:19.6	3 R	7:38.2	1 Q	7:32.4	4
George Cooke; Bert Sandos; Bob Stiles; Jack Macdonald; Lawrence Jackson; Rangi Thompson; Charles Saunders; John Solomon; Delmont Gullery (cox)	Eight	6:38.2	4 R	6:52.2	2	Did not advance	
