= Jamie Joseph =

New Zealand-born Japanese rugby union player and coach

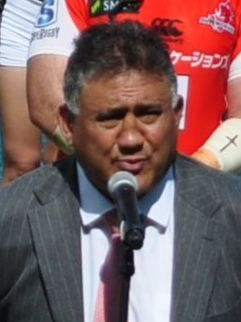
- Born: James Whitinui Joseph; 21 November 1969 (age 56) Blenheim, New Zealand
- Height: 1.96 m (6 ft 5 in)
- Weight: 125 kg (276 lb)
- School: Church College of New Zealand
- University: University of Otago
- Notable relatives: Maia Joseph (daughter); Jack Macdonald (great-uncle); Lynne Macdonald; Hoani MacDonald (cousin); Leon MacDonald

Rugby union career
- Position(s): Flanker, lock
Senior career
Years	Team	Apps	(Points)
1995–2001	Fukuoka Sanix Blues		
Provincial / State sides
Years	Team	Apps	(Points)
1989–1995	Otago	86	
International career
Years	Team	Apps	(Points)
1991–1994	New Zealand Māori	10	
1992–1995	New Zealand	20	(5)
1999	Japan	9	(10)
Coaching career
- Years: Team
- 2003–2007: Wellington (assistant coach)
- 2006: Māori All Blacks
- 2007–2010: Wellington
- 2010–2012: Māori All Blacks
- 2010–2016: Highlanders
- 2015: Barbarians
- 2016–2023: Japan
- 2017–2018: Sunwolves
- 2024– (Note: Joseph was Director of Rugby in 2024, and has been head coach since 2025.): Highlanders
- 2025–: All Blacks XV
- Correct as of 5 June 2026

James Whitinui Joseph (born 21 November 1969) is a New Zealand rugby union coach and former player. He is the current head coach of the Highlanders and the All Blacks XV.

A flanker, Joseph represented Otago at a provincial level, and was a member of the New Zealand national team, the All Blacks, from 1992 to 1995, before representing Japan in 1999.

Since his retirement, Joseph has coached Wellington, the Māori All Blacks, the Highlanders, Japan and the Sunwolves. He returned to the Highlanders in 2024 and was appointed head coach of the All Blacks XV in 2025.

== Early life and family ==
Joseph was born in Blenheim, New Zealand. His father, Jim Joseph, was a prop for the Marlborough rugby team from 1963 to 1977 and also played for New Zealand Māori. His mother Maude (née MacDonald) is the sister of Iwi and Mugwi MacDonald, the daughter of Manny MacDonald, granddaughter of Jack MacDonald and aunt of Hoani MacDonald, all of whom represented New Zealand Māori. Joseph affiliates to Ngāti Maniapoto through his father and Rangitāne and Ngāti Rārua through his mother. He was educated at Church College and the University of Otago, where he completed a Bachelor of Physical Education majoring in psychology.

== Playing career ==
Joseph made his debut for Otago in 1989, playing mainly at lock, which was the position he was selected for when playing for the New Zealand Colts in his debut season. By 1991, Joseph was a consistent starter for his province and was moved to number six where his athleticism and line-out ability saw him gain a call-up to the New Zealand Maori squad where he played 10 times between 1991 and 1994. In that same year, he was part of Otago's National Provincial Championship winning side.

In 1992, Joseph was quickly promoted to the All Black trials and gained a place in the centenary series. On 22 April 1992, Joseph made his All Blacks international debut against a World XV side off the bench. Later that year, he started his first test, playing at 6 against Ireland.

When playing for the All Blacks against England in 1993, Joseph stamped on Kyran Bracken's ankle causing a significant injury.

Joseph remained as a regular starter for the All Blacks and was part of the 1995 Rugby World Cup squad that lost to South Africa in the final.

After the World Cup, Joseph moved to Japan where he played for Fukuoka Sanix Blues. He played for the newly formed side for six years, which saw him be selected for the Japanese national side ahead of the 1999 Rugby World Cup. He made his debut on 1 May 1999 against Canada in Tokyo.

=== Honours as player ===
New Zealand

- Rugby World Cup / Webb Ellis Cup
  - Runners-up: 1995
- Bledisloe Cup
  - Winners: 1993
- British Lions Tour
  - Winners: 1993

Otago

- National Provincial Championship
  - Winners: 1991

== Coaching career ==
=== 2003–2007 ===
After retiring from playing rugby in early 2001, Joseph returned home to New Zealand. In 2003, he was appointed as the Wellington Lions skills coach before being promoted to assistant coach by Aussie Mclean ahead of the 2007 Air New Zealand Cup. In that year, Wellington made the final, only to lose to Auckland 23–14. In 2006, he was assistant coach to Donny Stevenson for the Māori All Blacks during the 2006 Churchill Cup, which saw the Māori team win the title after beating Scotland A 52–17 in the final.

=== 2008–2010 ===
In November 2007, Joseph was later named as the new head coach of Wellington Lions with Aussie Mclean stepping down from his role to coach Super 14 side Hurricanes. In his first match in charge, Wellington convincingly defeated Hawke's Bay 30–6. A further eight victories saw the Lions finish top seed ahead of the Knockout stage of the 2008 Air New Zealand Cup. After beating Taranaki and Southland in the quarterfinals and semifinals, Joseph led Wellington to a narrow loss to Canterbury in the final, losing 7–6. For a further two seasons, Wellington made the play-offs, including a third consecutive final in 2009, again like in 2008, losing narrowly to Canterbury 28–20.

In May 2010, Joseph was named the Māori All Blacks head coach for their matches against Ireland and England, both of which was won by the Māori side; 31–28 and 35–28 respectively.

The 2010 ITM Cup would be Joseph's last season in charge of the provincial side, with Joseph being named the new Highlanders head coach ahead of the 2011 Super Rugby season in July 2010. The 2010 ITM Cup saw Wellington be knocked out at the semifinals stage, losing to Canterbury 57–41.

=== 2011–2016 ===
In his first season in charge of a franchise side, Joseph's saw mixed results with the Highlanders only winning half of their games (8 won, 8 lost) to finish eighth on the table. In 2012 the side dropped one place, but won more than half of their games during the season. This later saw Joseph resign with the franchise as head coach.

In November 2012, Joseph retained his role as the Māori All Blacks head coach for their tour of the United Kingdom, which saw the side win two of their three game; defeating a RFU Championship XV side 52–21 and Canada 32–19. Their loss coming against Leicester Tigers 32–24 in their opening match of the tour.

In 2013, Joseph's side dropped to their worst positioning since 1997, only winning three games from sixteen. That same year, he stood down from his role as Māori All Blacks head coach. The 2014 Super Rugby season saw the Highlanders make the play-off for the first time since 2002, however was knocked out by the Sharks in the qualifiers, losing 31–27. For a second consecutive year, the Highlanders made the play-offs, and after beating the Chiefs in the qualifiers and then 2014 premiers the Waratahs, the Highlanders found themselves in their first final since 1999. In an all-New Zealand Grand Final, the Highlanders won their first ever premiership, after beating the Hurricanes 21–14.

In August 2015, Joseph coached the famous invitational team the Barbarians in a 2015 RWC warm-up match for Samoa. He coached the side to a close 27–24 victory over the Test side.

In January 2016, Joseph announced that he would be stepping down as the Highlanders head coach after the 2016 Super Rugby season so that he could coach the Japanese national side through to the 2019 Rugby World Cup. In his absence until he could formally start his duties with the Brave Blossoms, Ryuji Nakatake and Mark Hammett acted as interim head coaches during the 2016 Asia Rugby Championship and 2016 June Tests. The 2016 Super Rugby season again saw the Highlanders make the play-offs but was defeated by the Lions in the semifinals, losing 42–30.

=== Move to Japan (2016) ===
==== Head coach of Japan ====
Joseph's first test in charge of Japan was a home game against Argentina, which saw the Japan debut 13 players in a game that was won by the Pumas 54–20. Joseph's first victory came a week later against Georgia in Tbilisi, winning 28–22, this was followed by a narrow loss to Wales in Cardiff – a 79th minute drop goal from Sam Davies sealing the Welsh a victory 33–30. Japan's final match on their November tour saw Fiji claim a 38–25 win at a neutral venue in France.

In May 2017, Japan sealed their twelfth consecutive Asia Rugby Championship winning all four games. They later went onto defeat Romania 33–21 during the June internationals. Despite this, Japan lost to Ireland 2–0, during their first test series since 2005, losing the first test 50–22 and the second 35–13. In November 2017, Joseph led his side to a single win and a draw in four games. They started their End-of-year series with two consecutive home losses, a 27–47 loss to a World XV side and a 30–63 loss to Australia. Japan's first win came against Tonga 39–6 in Toulouse, France, before going on to draw with France 23–23, which was the first time that these two nations had drawn with one another.

During the 2018 June tests, Joseph led Japan to a 1-all series draw with Italy, winning the first test 34–17, and losing the second 25–22. The team then beat Georgia 28–0 at the Toyota Stadium. The 2018 November test window saw Japan come away with just a single victory – against Russia 32–27. However, Japan did lead England at half time, before eventually losing 35–15.

The start of their 2019 international season, ahead of their home World Cup, Japan won the 2019 World Rugby Pacific Nations Cup after winning all three of their games; including a win over Fiji for the first time since 2011.

===== Honours as Japanese coach =====
- Asia Rugby Championship
  - Winners: 2017
- World Rugby Pacific Nations Cup
  - Winners: 2019

==== Sunwolves ====
On 29 September 2017, following an unconvincing first two seasons in the Super Rugby, the Sunwolves went under a review in conjunction with the Japan Rugby Football Union and SANZAAR. The review concluded with the team undergoing a restructure which sees the side move from the JRFU to a new organisation, the Japan Super Rugby Association (JSRA). One of the main changes saw the national team's head coach Joseph replace Filo Tiatia as head coach, doubling up his duties with the national team.

In his first game in charge the Sunwolves narrowly lost to the Brumbies 32–25 in Tokyo. For the first 12 rounds, the Sunwolves managed just two points, picking up minimal bonus points throughout the season; one of which was a losing bonus point to the 2017 runners-up the Lions in Johannesburg (40–38). It wasn't until rounds 13 and 14 where the Sunwolves gained their first victories, gaining back-to-back victories by knocking over the Queensland Reds 63–28, and the Stormers 26–23 in Tokyo. In round 17, Joseph led his side to a Super Rugby best, winning a third game for the first time, beating the Bulls 42–37. Despite finishing bottom of the combined Super Rugby table, the Sunwolves experienced their best season, winning three games and earning 14 points. On 20 September 2018, Joseph stood down as head coach at the Sunwolves to fully concentrate on the preparations of the national team ahead of the 2019 Rugby World Cup.

=== Other honours as coach ===
Māori All Blacks

- Churchill Cup
  - Winners: 2006 (as Asst. Coach)

Wellington

- Air New Zealand Cup
  - Runners-up: 2007 (as Asst. Coach) – 2008, 2009 (as Head Coach)

Highlanders

- Super Rugby
  - Winners: 2015

=== All Blacks XV ===
In late September 2025, Jamie Joseph was appointed head coach of the All Blacks XV, New Zealand's second international men's team. The position at the time of his appointment was vacant with previous coach Clayton McMillan taking a role in Ireland months earlier. The deal was for 2025 and 2026, and upon his appointment, was speculated that the move was to put pressure on New Zealand coach Scott Robertson.

== Notes ==
Sporting positions
Preceded by (New Zealand) Mark Hammett (interim)	Japan national rugby union coach 2016–2023	Succeeded by (Australia) Eddie Jones
