= Charles Drueding =

American rower

Personal information
- Born: July 19, 1913 Philadelphia, Pennsylvania, United States
- Died: January 6, 1970 (aged 56) Abington, Pennsylvania, United States

Sport
- Sport: Rowing

Charles Drueding (July 19, 1913 – January 6, 1970) was an American rower. He competed in the men's coxed four event at the 1932 Summer Olympics.
