= Francis Fitzwilliams =

Irish-born English rower (1907–1976)

Personal information
- Nationality: British (English)
- Born: 7 September 1907 Ireland
- Died: 19 March 1976 (aged 68) Harlow, Essex

Sport
- Sport: Rowing
- Event(s): Coxless Four, eight
- Club: London RC
Medal record
Men's Rowing
Representing England
British Empire Games
Gold medal – first place	1930 Hamilton	Coxless Four
Gold medal – first place	1930 Hamilton	Eights

Francis Morshead Lloyd Fitzwilliams (1907-1976) was an Irish born English rower.

== Biography ==
He competed in the coxless four at the 1930 British Empire Games for England and won a gold medal, with Arthur Harby, Humphrey Boardman and Hugh Edwards and won a second gold medal as part of the eight.

He was a clerk at the time of the 1930 Games.
