= Américo Fernandes =

Brazilian rower

Personal information
- Full name: Américo Garcia Fernandes
- Born: 8 February 1900; Rio de Janeiro, Brazil
- Died: 3 July 1993 (aged 93)

Sport
- Sport: Rowing

Américo Garcia Fernandes (Note: This name uses Portuguese naming customs: the first or maternal family name is Garcia and the second or paternal family name is Fernandes.) (8 February 1900 – 3 July 1993) was a Brazilian rower. He competed in the men's coxed four event at the 1932 Summer Olympics.
