= Don Evans (athlete) =

New Zealand middle-distance runner

Personal information
- Full name: Cyril Vardon Evans
- Born: 24 October 1909 Taihape, New Zealand
- Died: 26 February 1980 (aged 70) Whanganui, New Zealand

Sport
- Country: New Zealand
- Sport: Athletics

Achievements and titles
- National finals: 440 yards champion (1931); 880 yards champion (1930, 1931, 1935); 1 mile champion (1930)
- Personal best: 880 yards – 1:54.8

Cyril Vardon "Don" Evans (24 October 1909 – 26 February 1980) was a New Zealand middle-distance runner who represented his country at the 1932 Olympic Games in Los Angeles.

== Biography ==
Born in Taihape in 1909, Evans was the son of Grace Emily (née Wood) and John Evans. As a youth, Evans competed in professional athletics meetings in Taihape as there were no amateur meets in that area. At one such competition in March 1929 he won the 440 yards, 880 yards and 1 mile events, and collected a purse of £35, but at a meeting of the council of the New Zealand Amateur Athletic Association in October 1929 he was reinstated as an amateur.

At the 1930 national amateur athletics championships, Evans won both the 880 yards and 1 mile titles, but he was not selected for the New Zealand team to the 1930 British Empire Games in Hamilton, Ontario, as he was deemed ineligible because of his earlier professional status.

In February 1931, Evans broke the Australasian 880 yards record at a meet in Whanganui, recording a time of 1:54.8. At the end of that month he won both the 440 yards and 880 yards titles at the national championships. Following negotiations between the New Zealand Amateur Athletics Association and the English Amateur Athletics Association later in 1931, Evans was deemed eligible to compete at the Olympic Games. He was duly selected as a member of the New Zealand team to compete at the 1932 Olympics, where he finished fifth in his 800 m heat and did not progress.

Evans won one more national athletics title, the 880 yards in 1935.

He died at Whanganui in 1980, and his ashes were buried in Aramoho Cemetery.
