= Hans Eller =

German rower (1910–1943)

Medal record

Men's rowing

Representing Germany

Olympic Games
Gold medal – first place	1932 Los Angeles	Coxed four

Hans Eller (14 August 1910 – 4 April 1943) was a German rower who competed in the 1932 Summer Olympics in Los Angeles, US. In 1932 he won the gold medal as member of the German boat in the coxed fours competition.

== Biography ==
Born as Johannes Eller on 10 August 1910 in Danzig-Oliva, his father was a naval captain and mother a home maker.

He studied in Grenoble, France and later gained a law degree from Berlin. He worked for "Wirtschaftsgruppe Elektroindustrie," and had clients such as Siemens, Mende, and Phillips, some of which he then defended against nationalization from the National Socialist government.

Eller married Hildegard Kluge in Dresden on 23 December 1939 and has a son (Hans-Peter M. Eller) born in Dresden on 22 March 1943. He was January 1940, and wounded in France. After recuperation Eller was sent to Russia, but declared missing 23 January 1943. The search division of the German Red Cross recently found from Russian records that he died in a camp near Starobelsk on 4 April 1943.

He was a member of the Berliner Ruder Club and also participated successfully as crew member in fours in Henley Regattas.

He was killed in action during World War II.

== See also ==
- List of solved missing person cases (pre-1950)
