= Umetaro Shibata =

Japanese rower

Personal information
- Nationality: Japanese
- Born: c. 1909

Sport
- Sport: Rowing

Umetaro Shibata (c. 1909 – after 2006) was a Japanese rower. He competed in the men's coxed four event at the 1932 Summer Olympics.
