= Lawrence Jackson (rower) =

New Zealand rower (1907–1937)

Personal information
- Birth name: Lawrence Woodgate
- Born: 27 February 1907; Tahuahua Bay, Queen Charlotte Sound, New Zealand
- Died: 28 October 1937 (aged 30); Picton, New Zealand
- Spouse: Mary McGuinness (m. 1930)

Sport
- Country: New Zealand
- Sport: Rowing

Achievements and titles
- National finals: Fours champion (1930, 1936)

Lawrence Jackson (born Lawrence Woodgate; 27 February 1907 − 28 October 1937) was a New Zealand rower who represented his country at the 1932 Olympic Games in Los Angeles. He was a member of the New Zealand crew that was eliminated in the repêchage of the men's eight. Jackson, of Ngāi Tahu descent, and Jack Macdonald, also a member of the men's eight, were the first Māori Olympians.

Rowing for the Picton club, Jackson was a member of the champion national fours crew in both 1930 and 1936.

== Biography ==
He was born Lawrence Woodgate at Tahuahua Bay (Blackwood Bay) in Queen Charlotte Sound on 27 February 1907, the youngest son of Thomas Woodgate and Annie Woodgate (née Huntley). His mother died in 1911 and Woodgate was raised by Harry Jackson and his wife in Picton. He joined the Picton Rowing Club in 1923 and became nicknamed 'Jumbo Jackson'.

He died of pneumonia in Picton in 1937 and was buried at Picton Cemetery.
