= Stanisław Urban =

Polish rower (1907–1940)

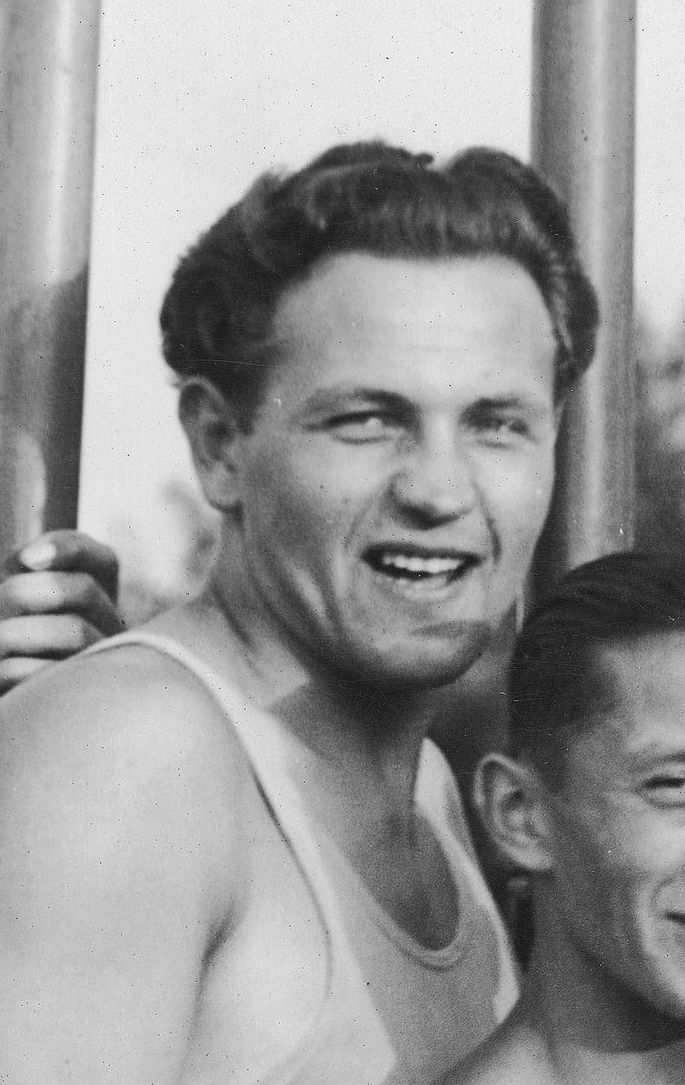
- Urban in 1932

Personal information
- Born: 13 September 1907 Warsaw, Congress Poland, Russian Empire
- Died: April 1940 (aged 32) Katyn, Russian SFSR, Soviet Union
- Height: 188 cm (6 ft 2 in)
- Weight: 89 kg (196 lb)

Sport
- Sport: Rowing
- Club: AZS Warszawa
Medal record
Men's rowing
Representing Poland
Olympic Games
Bronze medal – third place	1932 Los Angeles	Coxed four

Stanisław Urban (13 September 1907 – April 1940) was a Polish rower who competed in the 1928 Summer Olympics and in the 1932 Summer Olympics.

In 1928 he was part of the Polish boat which finished fourth in the eight event after being eliminated in the quarter-finals. Four years later he won the bronze medal as member of the Polish boat in the coxed four competition.

He was a reserve lieutenant in the Polish Army and participated in the Polish defensive war in September 1939. Arrested by the Soviets he was murdered in the Katyn massacre.
