= Harry Grossmiller =

American rower

Personal information
- Nationality: American
- Born: March 9, 1910 Atlantic City, New Jersey, United States
- Died: July 20, 1945 (aged 35) Philadelphia, Pennsylvania, United States

Sport
- Sport: Rowing

Harry Grossmiller (March 9, 1910 – July 20, 1945) was an American rower. He competed in the men's coxed four event at the 1932 Summer Olympics.
