= Carlheinz Neumann =

German rower

Olympic medal record

Men's rowing
Gold medal – first place	1932 Los Angeles	Coxed four

Carlheinz Neumann (27 November 1905 – 19 May 1983) was a German rower who competed in the 1932 Summer Olympics.

In 1932 he won the gold medal as coxswain of the German boat in the coxed four competition.
