= Norio Ban =

Japanese rower

Personal information
- Nationality: Japanese
- Born: c. 1914 Tokyo, Japan

Sport
- Sport: Rowing

Norio Ban (伴 紀雄, Ban Norio) (born c. 1914) was a Japanese rower. He competed in the men's coxed four event at the 1932 Summer Olympics.

== Early life and education ==
Ban was born on 11 February 1914 in Akasaka, Tokyo (now Minato City). While attending Keio Normal School, he joined the rowing club and began competing. He later studied at Keio University after completing studies at Keio Commercial School.
