= Lynne Macdonald =

New Zealand and England netball international

Personal information
- Full name: Lynne Macdonald
- Born: 21 April 1949 (age 77) New Zealand
- Height: 1.70 m (5 ft 7 in)
- Relatives: Jack Macdonald (uncle); Jamie Joseph; Hoani MacDonald; Leon MacDonald

Netball career
- Playing positions: WD, GA
| Years | National team | Caps |
| 1969 | New Zealand | 2 |
| 1975 | England | |
Medal record
Representing England
World Netball Tournament
| Silver medal – second place | 1975 Auckland | Team |

Lynne Macdonald (born 21 April 1949) is a former netball international who represented both New Zealand and England. She was a member of the England team that were silver medallists at the 1975 World Netball Tournament. An all-round sportswoman, Macdonald also represented New Zealand at basketball and softball.

== Family ==
Macdonald is a member of a notable Māori sporting family. She has Rangitāne and Ngāti Raukawa affiliations. Her father, Enoka Macdonald, played rugby league for Halifax, including in the 1948–49 Challenge Cup final. Her uncle, Jack Macdonald, played rugby union for the New Zealand Maoris. In 1978, her brother, Judge John Enoka Macdonald, captained the New Zealand men's national basketball team when they defeated Australia for the first time. Other relatives include New Zealand rugby union internationals, Jamie Joseph and Leon MacDonald, and Hoani MacDonald, who played rugby union for Highlanders.

== Playing career ==
=== New Zealand ===
On 20 June 1969, Macdonald made her senior debut for the New Zealand national netball team during a two-Test home series against Australia. However, she subsequently moved to Australia after the 1969 series and then went on to England.

=== England ===
Macdonald represented England at the 1975 World Netball Tournament and in tours of Australia and New Zealand.

== Honours ==
England

- World Netball Tournament
  - Runners Up: 1975
