= Justin Brown (rower) =

English rower

Personal information
- Nationality: British (English)
- Born: 10 December 1904 Rangoon, Myanmar
- Died: 1933

Sport
- Sport: Rowing
- Event: Eights
- Club: London RC
Medal record
Men's Rowing
Representing England
British Empire Games
Gold medal – first place	1930 Hamilton	Eights

Justin Arrowsmith Brown (1904-1933) was an English rower.

== Biography ==
Brown competed for the 1930 English team in the eights event at the 1930 British Empire Games in Hamilton, Ontario, Canada and won a gold medal.

He was in the Royal Air Force (No.4 squadron) at the time of the 1930 Games.
