= Edgar Howitt =

English rower

Personal information
- Nationality: British (English)
- Born: 12 September 1909 Surrey, England
- Died: 1975 Reading, England

Sport
- Sport: Rowing
- Event: Eights
- Club: London RC
Medal record
Men's Rowing
Representing England
British Empire Games
Gold medal – first place	1930 Hamilton	Eights

Edgar George Leonard Howitt (1909–1975) was an English rower.

== Biography ==
Howitt competed for the 1930 English team in the eights event at the 1930 British Empire Games in Hamilton, Ontario, Canada and won a gold medal.

He was a clerk at the time of the 1930 Games.
