= Walter Meyer =

German rower

Olympic medal record

Men's rowing
Gold medal – first place	1932 Los Angeles	Coxed four

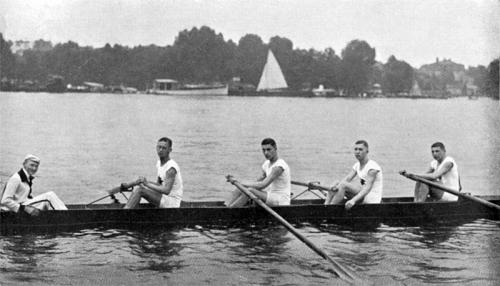
Junior-Vierer des R.C. "Werder" Magdeburg am 27.Mai oder 16./17.Juni 1923 in Berlin Grünau. Der sogenannte "Hoffmann"-Vierer mit G. Schultz, Günther Dankworth, Walter Meyer, 1932 Olympiasieger im 4+ in Los Angeles, Günther Hoffmann und Stm. Werner Fischer

Walter Meyer (14 September 1904 – 5 December 1949) was a German rower who competed in the 1932 Summer Olympics.

In 1932 he won the gold medal as member of the German boat in the coxed four competition. He died in the NKVD special camp Nr. 7 after World War II. Meyer had been interned due to his membership in the Nazi Party since 1933.
