= Durval Lima =

Brazilian rower

Personal information
- Born: 28 May 1908; Rio de Janeiro, Brazil
- Died: 30 July 1990 (aged 82)

Sport
- Sport: Rowing

Durval Lima (28 May 1908 – 30 July 1990) was a Brazilian rower. He competed in the men's coxed four event at the 1932 Summer Olympics.
