= London Rowing Club =

British rowing club

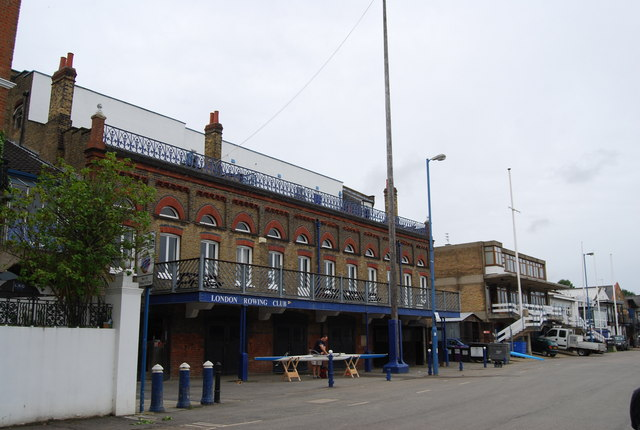

- Location: Putney, London, England
- Coordinates: 51°28′7.5″N 0°13′10″W
- Home water: Tideway
- Founded: 1856
- Key people: Mike Baldwin (President); Matthew Reeder (Captain); Stuart Heap (Chief Coach)
- Affiliations: British Rowing boat code - LRC
- Website: londonrc.org.uk

Notable members
- James Clarke; Jessica Eddie; Danny Harte; Phelan Hill; Sophie Hosking; Farn Carpmael; James Lindsay-Fynn; Mathilde Pauls; Rob Williams; Dan Topolski; Graham Hill; Charles Dickens Jr (1866)

London Rowing Club (LRC, or colloquially, 'London') is the second-oldest of the non-academic active rowing clubs on the Thames in London, United Kingdom. It was founded in 1856 by members of the long-disbanded Argonauts Club wishing to compete at Henley Royal Regatta.

It is regarded as one of the most successful rowing clubs in Britain and its patron was Prince Philip, Duke of Edinburgh.

== History ==
The club was founded in 1856 at the instigation of Herbert Playford, A. A. Casamajor and Josias Nottidge for the purpose of promoting rowing on the river Thames and winning medals at Henley Royal Regatta. These three formed part of the crew that won the Grand Challenge Cup at Henley in 1857. LRC is the second-oldest of the non-academic type in London; the oldest is Poplar Blackwall and District Rowing Club having taken that status from Leander Club which gradually migrated from 1897 to 1961 to Henley on Thames in Oxfordshire.

The club and its members were fundamental in the setting up and evolution of the Metropolitan Regatta

It is one of the seven founding clubs of the Remenham Club at Henley and was one of five clubs which retained the right to appoint representatives directly to the Council of British Rowing. This right was removed from those five clubs in September 2012.

=== Modern day ===
Phelan Hill was the cox of the Rio Olympic Games in 2016 Gold Medal Open eight. Jess Eddie was in the Women's eight that won the silver medal at Rio Olympic Games in 2016

Sophie Hosking the Gold Medal winner and Rob Williams competed for Great Britain at the London Olympic Games in 2012 in the women's lightweight double sculls and men's lightweight coxless four.

The club won the Wyfolds in 2011 and also provided half of the oarsmen in the composite international lightweight crews that won the Club Quads in 2007. Most recently, they also won the Wyfold Challenge Cup again in 2023.

Two of its members, James Lindsay-Fynn and James Clarke, competed in the Beijing Olympic Games in 2008 as part of the Lightweight Men's Coxless Fours. Nick Strange and Ben Helm competed in the Lightweight double sculls and Lightweight four at the Atlanta Olympic Games in 1996. The London lightweight four of 1994; Butt, Watson, Strange and Helm set a Worlds best time for Open and Lightweight fours of 05:48:86 (Paris, May '94)

== Facilities ==
London Rowing Club began in rented rooms at Star & Garter Pub in Putney. Today, the club has a substantial boathouse (altered and extended in 1974, 2008 and 2018/19) by Putney Bridge. The new Peter Coni Gym was opened in 2019 by present and past club Presidents Mike Baldwin and Mike Williams. It occupies the space over the rowing tank that dated back to the 1920s, the old men's changing room and the old gym. The design specification required a low carbon footprint resulting in a modern passive ventilation system among other items.

== Members ==
Former members of the club include the British racing driver Graham Hill, the Formula One World Champion in 1962 and 1968 and only driver to win the Triple Crown of Motorsport. From 1952 to 1954, Hill rowed in twenty finals with London, usually as stroke of the crew, eight of which resulted in wins. He also stroked the London eight for the highly ranked clubs/composites cup at Henley Royal Regatta. He used the colours of the club as his motor racing helmet design, as have his descendants, Formula One World Champion racing driver son, Damon, and Formula Renault driver Josh.

Current club members include international rowers for Great Britain, Ireland and Germany, and include:

- James Clarke
- Jess Eddie
- Danny Harte
- Phelan Hill
- Stephen Feeney
- Sophie Hosking
- James Lindsay-Fynn
- Mathilde Pauls
- Rob Williams

The former chief coach was Australian silver medallist Paul Reedy.

== Honours ==
=== British Empire Games ===
Year	Winning crew/s	Ref
1930	Gold medal, Eights: Arthur Harby, Edgar Howitt, Francis Fitzwilliams, Humphrey Boardman, Hugh Edwards, Justin Brown, Geoffrey Crawford, Roger Close-Brooks, Terence O'Brien	
1930	Gold medal, Coxless four: Francis Fitzwilliams, Arthur Harby, Hugh Edwards, Humphrey Boardman	

=== Recent British champions ===
Year	Winning crew/s
2009	Open 1x
2010	Open 4-, Open 4+, Open 8+, Open L2x, Open L2-, Open L4-
2011	Open L2x
2014	Women 4x, Women 4-
2024	Women club 1x

=== Henley Royal Regatta ===
Year	Races won
1857	Grand Challenge Cup, Stewards' Challenge Cup, Diamond Challenge Sculls
1858	Stewards' Challenge Cup, Silver Goblets, Diamond Challenge Sculls
1859	Grand Challenge Cup
1860	Silver Goblets, Diamond Challenge Sculls, Wyfold Challenge Cup
1861	Diamond Challenge Sculls
1862	Grand Challenge Cup, Diamond Challenge Sculls, Wyfold Challenge Cup
1864	Stewards' Challenge Cup
1865	Silver Goblets
1868	Grand Challenge Cup, Stewards' Challenge Cup, Diamond Challenge Sculls
1869	Stewards' Challenge Cup, Silver Goblets
1871	Stewards' Challenge Cup, Silver Goblets
1872	Grand Challenge Cup, Stewards' Challenge Cup, Presentation Cup
1873	Grand Challenge Cup, Stewards' Challenge Cup
1874	Grand Challenge Cup, Stewards' Challenge Cup, Silver Goblets
1875	Stewards' Challenge Cup, Thames Challenge Cup
1876	Stewards' Challenge Cup, Silver Goblets, Diamond Challenge Sculls
1877	Grand Challenge Cup, Stewards' Challenge Cup, Thames Challenge Cup
1878	Stewards' Challenge Cup, Thames Challenge Cup
1879	Silver Goblets, Wyfold Challenge Cup
1880	Thames Challenge Cup, Wyfold Challenge Cup
1881	Grand Challenge Cup
1883	Grand Challenge Cup, Thames Challenge Cup
1884	Grand Challenge Cup
1885	Thames Challenge Cup
1886	Thames Challenge Cup
1889	Wyfold Challenge Cup
1890	Grand Challenge Cup
1895	Stewards' Challenge Cup, Silver Goblets & Nickalls' Challenge Cup, Wyfold Challenge Cup
1896	Stewards' Challenge Cup, Silver Goblets & Nickalls' Challenge Cup
1905	Wyfold Challenge Cup
1906	Wyfold Challenge Cup
1914	Wyfold Challenge Cup
1923	Diamond Challenge Sculls
1926	Wyfold Challenge Cup
1927	Silver Goblets & Nickalls' Challenge Cup
1930	Grand Challenge Cup, Stewards' Challenge Cup, Wyfold Challenge Cup
1931	Grand Challenge Cup, Stewards' Challenge Cup, Thames Challenge Cup
1932	Thames Challenge Cup, Wyfold Challenge Cup
1933	Grand Challenge Cup, Wyfold Challenge Cup
1935	Thames Challenge Cup
1936	Wyfold Challenge Cup
1937	Wyfold Challenge Cup
1938	Grand Challenge Cup, Wyfold Challenge Cup
1947	Silver Goblets & Nickalls' Challenge Cup
1953	Diamond Challenge Sculls
1969	Wyfold Challenge Cup
1970	Britannia Challenge Cup
1971	Prince Philip Challenge Cup
1976	Double Sculls Challenge Cup, Wyfold Challenge Cup
1977	Stewards' Challenge Cup, Thames Challenge Cup
1978	Thames Challenge Cup
1979	Grand Challenge Cup, Stewards' Challenge Cup
1981	Stewards' Challenge Cup
1982	Grand Challenge Cup
1984	Grand Challenge Cup
1990	Wyfold Challenge Cup
1993	Double Sculls Challenge Cup, Wyfold Challenge Cup
1996	Stewards' Challenge Cup
1998	Thames Challenge Cup
2004	Thames Challenge Cup, Wyfold Challenge Cup
2005	Double Sculls Challenge Cup
2006	Thames Challenge Cup
2011	Wyfold Challenge Cup
2023	Wyfold Challenge Cup
2025	Thames Challenge Cup, Wyfold Challenge Cup

== See also ==
- Rowing on the River Thames
- Head of the River Race
- Metropolitan Regatta
- Thames Rowing Club
