= Edward Marshall (rower) =

American rower (1908–1984)

Personal information
- Born: October 6, 1908 Philadelphia, Pennsylvania, U.S.
- Died: May 26, 1984 (aged 75)

Sport
- Sport: Rowing

Edward Marshall (October 6, 1908 – May 26, 1984) was an American rower. He competed in the men's coxed four event at the 1932 Summer Olympics.
