= Fred Bradley (rower) =

English rower

Personal information
- Nationality: Britiah (English)
- Born: 1908

Sport
- Sport: Rowing
- Event: Single sculls
- Club: Pembroke College, Cambridge
Medal record
Men's Rowing
Representing England
British Empire Games
Bronze medal – third place	1930 Hamilton	Single sculls

Frederick Bradley (1908 – date of death unknown) was an English rower.

== Rowing ==
Bradley competed for the 1930 English team in the single sculls event at the 1930 British Empire Games in Hamilton, Ontario, Canada, where he won the bronze medal.

In 1931, Bradley finished runner-up behind Bobby Pearce in the Diamond Challenge Sculls at the Henley Royal Regatta.

== Personal life ==
He was listed as having no occupation at the time of the 1930 Games.
