= Daikichi Suzuki =

Japanese rower

Personal information
- Nationality: Japanese
- Born: c. 1913

Sport
- Sport: Rowing

Daikichi Suzuki (鈴木 大吉, Suzuki Daikichi) (born c. 1913, date of death unknown) was a Japanese rower. He competed in the men's coxed four event at the 1932 Summer Olympics.
