= John Gilby =

New Zealand rower

Personal information
- Born: Charles Frederick John Gilby; 13 December 1900
- Died: 8 June 1985 (aged 84)
- Height: 1.83 m (6 ft)
- Weight: 79 kg (175 lb)
- Spouse: Gwendolyn Hill (m. 1933)

Sport
- Country: New Zealand
- Sport: Rowing
- Club: Canterbury Rowing Club
Medal record
Men's rowing
Representing New Zealand
British Empire Games
| Silver medal – second place | 1930 Hamilton | Eights |

Charles Frederick John Gilby (13 December 1900 – 8 June 1985) was a New Zealand rower who competed at the 1930 British Empire Games.

== Early life and family ==
Born on 13 December 1900, Gilby was the son of Charles Horace Gilby, who was principal of Christchurch Commercial College, and his second wife, Gertrude Hilda Gilby (née Johnston). He was educated at Christ's College from 1911 to 1917, and went on to work initially as a mechanical engineer at the Christchurch firm of P. and D. Duncan. On 2 October 1933, he married Gwendolyn Hill at St Mary's Anglican Church, Levin.

== Rowing ==
A member of the Canterbury Rowing Club, Gilby represented New Zealand at the 1930 British Empire Games in Hamilton, Ontario. He was a member of the men's eight that won the silver medal, finishing three-quarters of a length behind the victorious English crew.

== Death ==
Gilby died on 8 June 1985, and was buried at Hautapu Cemetery, Cambridge.
