= Delmont Gullery =

New Zealand rower (1905–1982)

Personal information
- Birth name: Delmont Edward Gullery
- Nationality: New Zealand
- Born: 23 November 1905; Picton, New Zealand
- Died: 13 August 1982 (aged 76)

Delmont Edward Gullery (23 November 1905 – 13 August 1982) was a New Zealand rowing coxswain.

Gullery was born in 1905 in Picton, New Zealand. He represented New Zealand at the 1932 Summer Olympics. He is listed as New Zealand Olympian athlete number 30 by the New Zealand Olympic Committee.

Gullery died on 13 August 1982 in Wanganui, New Zealand.
