= Mathilde Pauls =

German and British rower (born 1983)

Personal information
- Nationality: German/British
- Born: 26 September 1983 (age 42) Berlin, Germany
Medal record
Women's rowing
Representing Great Britain
World Championships
Silver medal – second place	2007 Munich	LW4x

Mathilde Pauls (born 26 September 1983 in Berlin, Germany) is a German and British rower. She won the lightweight women's double at 2005 Amsterdam U23 World Championships together with Maxi Grützmacher. The same year she had also finished 3rd at the Eton World Cup in the lightweight women's single, her first World Cup and World Championship appearance. On the FISA database she is down as Henriette for this event, having incorrectly been entered by the German rowing federation. In 2007 she competed for Great Britain, winning the Lucerne World Cup in the lightweight women's 4x and finishing second at the Munich World Championships that year. In 2008 she struggled with back injury, finishing in the B-Final at 2008 Linz World Championships.

Other notable rowing achievements include a win in the 2005 Cambridge-Oxford Boat Race as the stroke of the Cambridge crew; reaching the final of the women's single, The Princess Royal Challenge Cup at 2008 Henley Royal; as well as wins in the single at Henley Women's Regatta.

After rowing Mathilde moved on to Duathlon, Triathlon, and Cycling, winning Gold medals at Duathlon European and World Championships at age group level. She continues to compete successfully in amateur bike racing.

She is a qualified doctor and works as a Consultant in Stroke and Neurology at Cambridge University Hospitals, England. She has published in the field of cerebral blood flow.
