= John Solomon (rower) =

New Zealand rower

Personal information
- Birth name: John Drummond Solomon
- Born: 12 November 1903; Port Chalmers
- Died: 23 February 1981 (aged 77)

Sport
- Sport: Rowing

John Drummond Solomon (12 November 1903 – 23 February 1981) was a New Zealand rower who competed in the 1932 Summer Olympics. He was a member of the New Zealand crew which finished fourth in the coxed four competition and was also in the eight's crew which was eliminated in the repêchage of the eight competition.

Solomon was born in Port Chalmers. He died on 23 February 1981.
