= Hoani MacDonald =

- Born: Hoani MacDonald; 21 August 1978 (age 48) Invercargill, New Zealand
- Height: 1.98 m (6 ft 6 in)
- Weight: 111 kg (245 lb)
- Notable relative(s): Lynne Macdonald; Jamie Joseph (cousin); Jack Macdonald (great-uncle); Dan Udy (great-great-uncle)

Rugby union career
- Position(s): Lock, flanker
Senior career
Years	Team	Apps	(Points)
2008–10	Newport Gwent	40	(10)
Provincial / State sides
Years	Team	Apps	(Points)
2000–08, 2010–12	Southland	52	(15)
Super Rugby
Years	Team	Apps	(Points)
2004–08, 2012	Highlanders	33	(10)
2011–12	Melbourne Rebels	6	(0)
International career
Years	Team	Apps	(Points)
2004–08	New Zealand Māori		
2006–07	Junior All Blacks		
Coaching career
- Years: Team
- 2015 –: Southland

Hoani MacDonald (born 21 August 1978) is a former New Zealand rugby union player and current coach. He played provincial rugby for Southland, and for the Highlanders in Super Rugby.

In September 2008, he joined Welsh side the Newport Gwent Dragons in the Celtic League.

MacDonald signed with the Melbourne Rebels for the 2011 Super Rugby season.

On 20 October 2012, MacDonald suffered a cardiac arrest in a match for Southland against Counties Manukau in an ITM Cup semi final. He had CPR performed on the pitch, before being transferred to hospital and placed in an induced coma. MacDonald was in hospital for one week and doctors fitted him with an implantable cardioverter-defibrillator. As a result, he retired from playing rugby.

In 2015, it was announced MacDonald had become the Southland coach for at least the next two seasons. He has been part of the coaching staff since his retirement.
