= Shokichi Nanba =

Japanese rower (1911–1995)

Personal information
- Nationality: Japanese
- Born: 26 September 1911
- Died: 24 January 1995 (aged 83)

Sport
- Sport: Rowing

Shokichi Nanba (南波 正吉, Nanba Shōkichi, 26 September 1911 – 24 January 1995) was a Japanese rower. While a student at Keio University, he joined a crew called Dragon Club, and later competed in the men's coxed four event at the 1932 Summer Olympics as a member of the Keiō Crew, a reorganized and strengthened version of Jison-kai crew from the same university.
