= Geoffrey Crawford (rower) =

English rower (1904–1942)

Personal information
- Nationality: British (English)
- Born: 5 February 1904 Yorkshire, England
- Died: 14 February 1942 (aged 38) Indonesia

Sport
- Sport: Rowing
- Event: Eights
- Club: London RC
Medal record
Men's Rowing
Representing England
British Empire Games
Gold medal – first place	1930 Hamilton	Eights

Geoffrey Hutchinson Crawford (5 February 1904 – 14 February 1942) was an English rower.

== Biography ==
Crawford gained a blue for Oxford at The Boat Race 1926.

He competed for the 1930 English team in the eights event at the 1930 British Empire Games in Hamilton, Ontario, Canada. where he won a gold medal.

He was an Agent at the time of the 1930 Games. Lieutenant Crawford was killed in action while serving with the Royal Artillery during World War II.
