= Roy Calder =

New Zealand swimmer and diver

Personal information
- Birth name: Robert Cadzow Calder
- Born: 12 March 1904; Lawrence, New Zealand
- Died: 1 July 1976 (aged 72)
- Height: 1.77 m (5 ft 9 1/2 in)
- Spouse: Mary Bridget Dunne

Sport
- Country: New Zealand
- Sport: Diving

Achievements and titles
- National finals: Diving, 1st (1926, 1927, 1928, 1929, 1930, 1932, 1933)

Robert Cadzow "Roy" Calder (12 March 1904 − 1 July 1976) was a New Zealand diver who represented his country at the 1930 British Empire Games in Hamilton, Ontario. He was hampered by a back injury at the games and was forced to withdraw from the high dive, but finished fourth in the springboard competition.

He won the New Zealand diving championship every year except 1931 between 1926 and 1933.

Calder died in 1976 and was buried in Andersons Bay Cemetery, Dunedin.
