= Somers Cox =

New Zealand rower

Personal information
- Birth name: Somers William Cox
- Nationality: New Zealand
- Born: 25 July 1911; Christchurch, New Zealand
- Died: 21 August 1997 (aged 86)

Somers William Cox (25 July 1911 – 21 August 1997) was a New Zealand rower.

Cox was born in 1911 in Christchurch, New Zealand. He represented New Zealand at the 1932 Summer Olympics. He is listed as New Zealand Olympian athlete number 26 by the New Zealand Olympic Committee.

Cox died on 21 August 1997 in Timaru, New Zealand.
