= Charles Saunders (rower) =

New Zealand rower

Charles Saunders MBE JP
Personal information
- Born: Charles Edward Saunders; 13 September 1902 Blenheim, New Zealand
- Died: 1 September 1994 (aged 91)
- Height: 1.78 m (5 ft 10 in)
- Weight: 75 kg (166 lb)
- Spouse: Merle Moore (m. 1935)

Sport
- Country: New Zealand
- Sport: Rowing
- Club: Wairau Rowing Club
Medal record
Men's rowing
Representing New Zealand
British Empire Games
Silver medal – second place	1930 Hamilton	Eights
Bronze medal – third place	1930 Hamilton	Coxless Fours

Charles Edward Saunders MBE JP (13 September 1902 – 1 September 1994) was a New Zealand rower who competed at the 1930 British Empire Games, winning two medals, and at the 1932 Summer Olympics.

== Early life and family ==
Born in Blenheim on 13 September 1902, Saunders was the youngest son of George Frederick Saunders and Elizabeth Saunders (née Lawrance). On 6 May 1935, he married Merle Moore at St Andrew's Church, Blenheim, and the couple went on to have three children.

== Rowing ==
A member of the Wairau Rowing Club, Saunders represented New Zealand at the 1930 British Empire Games in Hamilton, Ontario. He was a member of the men's eight that won the silver medal, and the men's coxless four that won the bronze medal.

At the 1932 Summer Olympics, he was part of the New Zealand men's coxed four that finished fourth in the final.

== Later life and death ==
In the 1975 Queen's Birthday Honours, Saunders was appointed a Member of the Order of the British Empire, for services to rowing and the community. He died on 1 September 1994, and his ashes were buried at Omaka Cemetery, Blenheim.
