= Noel Pope =

New Zealand rower

Personal information
- Birth name: Noel Francis Pope
- Nationality: New Zealand
- Born: 3 October 1907; Havelock, New Zealand
- Died: 18 September 1999 (aged 91)

Noel Francis Pope (3 October 1907 – 18 September 1999) was a New Zealand rower.

Pope was born in 1907 in Havelock, New Zealand. He was a member of Hamilton Rowing Club. He represented New Zealand at the 1932 Summer Olympics. He is listed as New Zealand Olympian athlete number 36 by the New Zealand Olympic Committee.

Pope died on 18 September 1999.
