= Bert Sandos =

New Zealand rower

Personal information
- Born: Bertram Magnus Sandos; 4 August 1901 Kaikōura, New Zealand
- Died: 23 August 1963 (aged 62)
- Height: 1.80 m (5 ft 11 in)
- Weight: 81 kg (179 lb)
- Spouse: Jeannie Webster Milne (m. 1927)

Sport
- Sport: Rowing
- Club: Hamilton Rowing Club
Medal record
Men's rowing
Representing New Zealand
British Empire Games
Gold medal – first place	1930 Hamilton	Coxed four
Silver medal – second place	1930 Hamilton	Eights

Bertram Magnus Sandos (4 August 1901 – 23 August 1963) was a New Zealand rower who competed at the 1930 British Empire Games, where he won two medals, and at the 1932 Summer Olympics.

== Early life and family ==
Born in Kaikōura on 4 August 1901, Sandos was the son of Johan Henrik Sandos and Clara Elizabeth Emily Sandos (née de Kierski). He was educated at Hamilton High School from 1916 to 1917. On 2 November 1927, Sandos married Jeannie Webster Milne, and the couple went on to have two children.

== Rowing ==
A member of the Hamilton Rowing Club, Sandos was described in 1930 as a "strong, experienced oarsman". He represented New Zealand at the 1930 British Empire Games in Hamilton, Ontario, where he won a gold medal in the coxed fours, and a silver medal in the eights.

At the 1932 Summer Olympics, he was a member of the New Zealand crew that was eliminated in the repêchage of the men's eight.

== Death ==
Sandos died on 23 August 1963, and he was cremated at Hamilton Park Crematorium.
