= Hugh Edwards (rower) =

British rower (1906–1972)

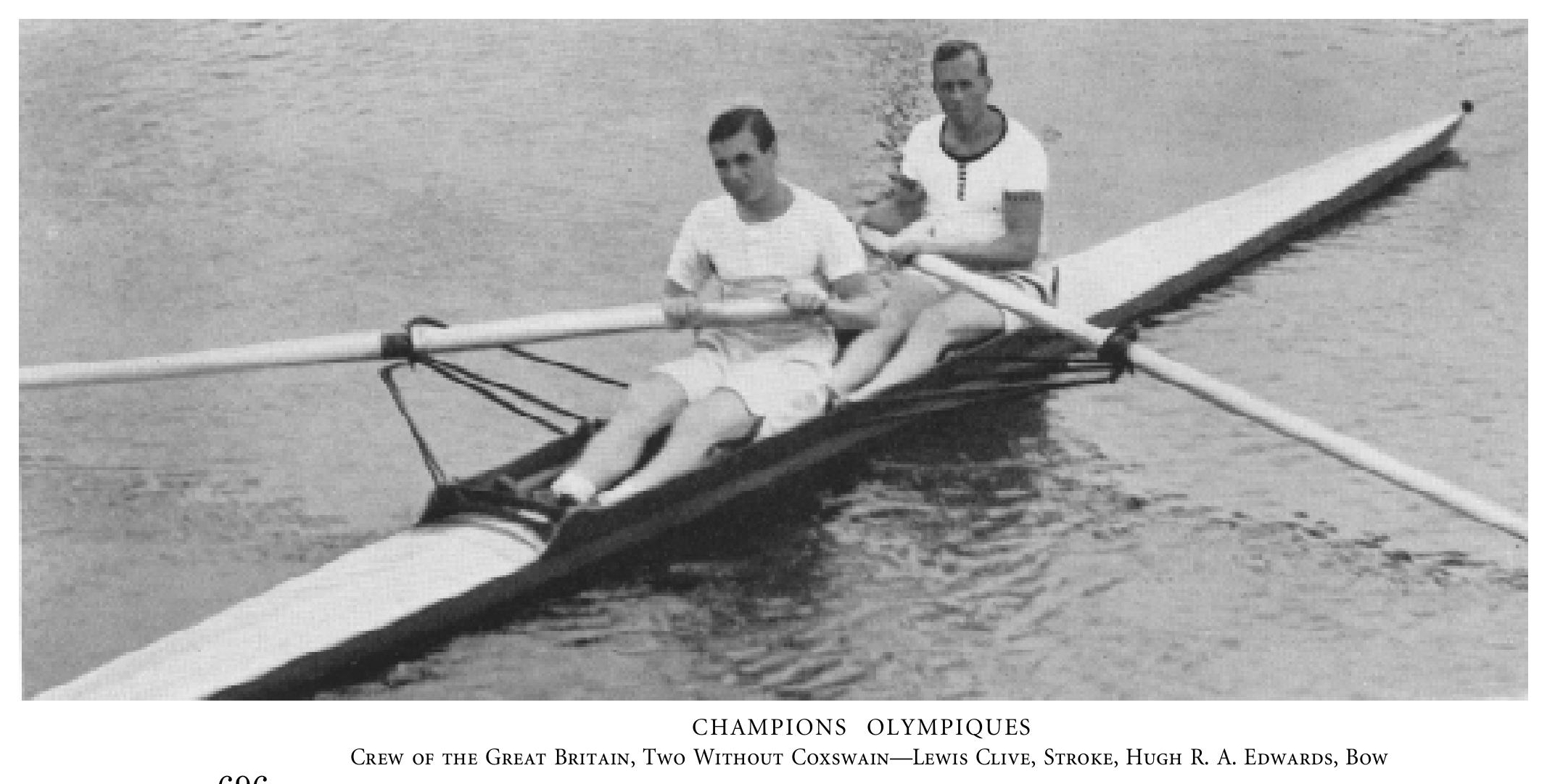
- Edwards (right) and Lewis Clive at the 1932 Summer Olympics

Personal information
- Nationality: British (English)
- Born: 17 November 1906 Woodstock, Oxfordshire, England
- Died: 21 December 1972 (aged 66) Southampton, England

Sport
- Sport: Rowing
- Events: Coxless Four, eight
- Club: London RC
Medal record
Men's rowing
Representing Great Britain
Olympic Games
Gold medal – first place	1932 Los Angeles	Coxless pair
Gold medal – first place	1932 Los Angeles	Coxless four
Representing England
British Empire Games
Gold medal – first place	1930 Hamilton	Coxed four
Gold medal – first place	1930 Hamilton	Eight

Hugh Robert Arthur Edwards (17 November 1906 – 21 December 1972), also known as Jumbo Edwards, was an English rower who competed for Great Britain at the 1932 Summer Olympics.

== Biography ==
He was born to Welsh-speaking parents in Woodstock, Oxfordshire and died in Southampton.

He went to Christ Church, Oxford, in 1925, and was the only Freshman selected to row in the 1926 Blue Boat. He collapsed during the race, and was later diagnosed as having a hypertrophied heart, and was told he was no longer needed to row for the university.

Edwards left Oxford in 1927 after failing his exams, and became a school teacher. He also recommenced rowing, with London Rowing Club. While rowing with London Rowing Club, he was successful at Henley Royal Regatta in 1928, 1929, and 1930, winning the Grand Challenge Cup in 1930. At the British Empire Games in Canada in 1930, London Rowing Club crews representing England, and which contained Edwards, won two gold medals, in the eights and in the coxed fours. He was then invited to row in the 1930 Oxford Blue Boat.

In the 1932 Olympics he won the gold medal in the coxless pairs event with Lewis Clive, and a second gold in the Great Britain coxless four, on the same day.

He later turned to competitive flying, coming second in the 1935 King's Cup Race.

During the Second World War Edwards served in RAF Coastal Command, once saving his own life by rowing four miles through a minefield in a dinghy after his plane crashed in the Atlantic Ocean. After rising to the rank of Group Captain, he was demobbed in 1946.

He was invited back to be a member of the Oxford coaching team in 1949, although resigned in 1957 after a disagreement with the Australian-born president, Roderick Carnegie. He was brought back in 1959 by OUBC President Ronnie Howard, but provoked a rebellion by certain members of the crew over his demands on them. Despite the resignation of certain members of the squad, Oxford beat Cambridge, and his subsequent coaching efforts made him an Oxford legend.

In 1962, he coached the Wales four containing his two sons that won silver at the Commonwealth Games in Perth, Australia.

He wrote a book on rowing technique in 1963 entitled The Way of a Man with a Blade. Having been a pupil of both Dr "Beja" Bourne and Steve Fairbairn, he sought to bring together the divergent rowing styles of English Orthodoxy and Fairbairnism.

A coxed four belonging to Christ Church Boat Club is named Jumbo Edwards. The club's other four, is named after Jonathan Searle, another Olympic Gold medallist.

== Works ==
- The Way of a Man with a Blade. Routledge & Kegan Paul. 1963.
