= Arthur Eastwood =

New Zealand jockey and rowing cox

Personal information
- Born: Arthur Henry Eastwood; 12 July 1905 Addington, New Zealand
- Died: 8 November 1934 (aged 29) Christchurch, New Zealand
- Weight: 43 kg (94 lb)
- Spouse: Hilda Elizabeth Pickett (m. 1928)
- Relative: Henry Suter (grandfather)
Medal record
Men's rowing
Representing New Zealand
British Empire Games
Gold medal – first place	1930 Hamilton	Coxed Fours
Silver medal – second place	1930 Hamilton	Eights

Arthur Henry Eastwood (12 July 1905 – 8 November 1934) was a New Zealand jockey and rowing coxswain who competed at the 1930 British Empire Games.

== Early life and family ==
Born in the Christchurch suburb of Addington, Eastwood was the son of Edward Eastwood and Emma Eastwood (née Suter), the daughter of Henry Suter. He married Hilda Elizabeth Pickett in 1928, and the couple had two children.

== Rowing ==
Eastwood was coxswain of the New Zealand rowing eight that toured Australia in 1925.

In 1930 he coxed the New Zealand coxed four team that won the gold medal in the British Empire Games in Hamilton, and the men's eight that earned a silver medal at the same Games.

== Horse racing ==
Eastwood became a jockey following the success of his brother, Clifford Edward Eastwood, as a leading New Zealand apprentice jockey. Based at Riccarton, Arthur Eastwood went on to become a leading jockey in his own right, winning two New Zealand Cups, the New Zealand Derby, and the New Zealand Oaks. He was first past the post in the 1930 Auckland Cup riding Gay Crest, but was subsequently relegated to second behind Motere because of interference near the end of the race.

Eastwood died at St George's Hospital in Christchurch on 8 November 1934, as a result of injuries sustained the previous day when the horse that he was riding in a race at Riccarton fell and rolled on top of him.
