= Alex Ross (rower) =

Sir Alex Ross
Personal information
- Born: Alexander Ross; 2 September 1907 Herekino, North Auckland, New Zealand
- Died: 10 April 1994 (aged 86) Tweed Heads West, New South Wales, Australia
- Occupation: Banker
- Height: 1.85 m (6 ft 1 in)
- Weight: 79 kg (175 lb)
- Spouses: Nora Burgess (m. 1933; died 1974) Cynthia Barton (m. 1975)

Sport
- Country: New Zealand
- Sport: Rowing
- Club: Auckland Rowing Club
Medal record
Men's rowing
Representing New Zealand
British Empire Games
| Bronze medal – third place | 1930 Hamilton | Coxless Fours |

Sir Alexander Ross (2 September 1907 – 10 April 1994) was a New Zealand-born banker and rower who competed at the 1930 British Empire Games. He was a rowing selector for New Zealand's Olympic and Commonwealth teams, New Zealand team manager for the Vancouver Commonwealth Games and chairman of the Commonwealth Games Federation from 1968 to 1982.

== Rowing ==
In 1930 he was a member of the men's Coxless fours team that won the bronze medal at the British Empire Games in Hamilton Ontario.

== Banking career ==
His banking career began with The National Bank of New Zealand. He transferred with his colleagues to the Reserve Bank of New Zealand when it was formed in 1934. He had risen to deputy Governor of the Reserve Bank when he was invited by a visitor to New Zealand, John Gibson Jarvie, to join Jarvie's banking group in London, United Dominions Trust Limited where Ross rose to be appointed chairman in 1963.

In 1953, Ross was awarded the Queen Elizabeth II Coronation Medal.

Ross was also a director, and later, chairman from 1970 to 1975 of Australia and New Zealand Banking Group then headquartered in London. Other posts included deputy chairman of Eagle Star Insurance and director of Whitbread Investment Trust. Ross served as chairman of the East European Trade Council, and in the 1971 New Year Honours, he was appointed a Knight Bachelor, for services to export.

== Family ==
Sir Alexander Ross, eldest son of William Alexander Ross and Kathleen née Marks, was born at Herekino, North Auckland, 2 September 1907. He married twice, first Nora Burgess who died in 1974 and they had 2 sons and 2 daughters. In 1975 he married Cynthia Barton. He died in retirement in his 87th year at Tweed Heads West in New South Wales, 10 April 1994.

Business positions
| Preceded by Lord Carrington | Chairman of ANZ Banking Group; 1970 – 1975 | Succeeded by Angus Mackinnon |
