= Jack Macdonald (sportsman) =

New Zealand rower

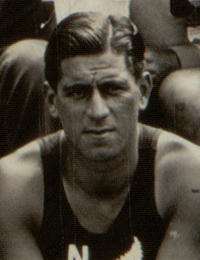
- Macdonald in 1932
- Born: John Hoani Macdonald; 26 October 1907; Blenheim, New Zealand
- Died: 1 January 1982 (aged 74); Picton, New Zealand
- Occupations: Professional rugby league player Restaurateur
- Relatives: Lynne Macdonald (niece); Leon MacDonald (grand-nephew); Hoani MacDonald (grand-nephew); Jamie Joseph (grand-nephew)

John Hoani Macdonald (26 October 1907 – 1 January 1982) was a New Zealand sportsman. He competed in rowing at the 1930 Empire Games, winning gold in the coxed fours, and at the 1932 Summer Olympics, becoming one of the first two Māori Olympians. He played rugby union for New Zealand Māori from 1926 to 1935 and professional rugby league in England from 1935 to 1939. During World War II he served in the Royal New Zealand Air Force and played rugby union for New Zealand Services and England Services sides. He also played tennis for the Royal New Zealand Air Force team in armed forces matches at Wimbledon. He was inducted into the Māori Sports Hall of Fame in 2008.

== Early life and family ==
Macdonald was born in Blenheim in 1907. Of Māori descent, he affiliated to the Rangitāne iwi. His father, also called Jack, played rugby for the New Zealand Māori team, as did his brothers Manny and Enoka. In accordance with his mother's wishes, Macdonald always spelled his name with a lower case 'd'.

== Rowing ==
Medal record

Men's rowing

Representing New Zealand

British Empire Games
Gold medal – first place	1930 Hamilton	Coxed four
Silver medal – second place	1930 Hamilton	Eight

Macdonald was a member of the Wairau Rowing Club. At the 1930 interprovincial championships on the Whau River in Auckland, he was the number five in the second-placed Marlborough eight.

He competed for New Zealand at the 1930 British Empire Games in Hamilton, Ontario, winning a gold medal in the men's coxed fours and a silver medal in the men's eights.

At the opening ceremony of the 1932 Olympic Games in Los Angeles, Macdonald was the flag bearer for New Zealand. He was a member of the New Zealand boat which was eliminated in the repêchage of the men's eight. Macdonald and Laurie Jackson, also a member of the men's eight, were the first Māori Olympians.

At the 1934 national rowing championship regatta in Picton, Macdonald was a member of the winning Wairau four and finished second in the pairs final. He again rowed in the Wairau four at the national championships in Auckland the following year, but the crew was unable to defend its title, finishing outside the first three.

Following the end of World War II in Europe, Macdonald put together a four to represent the Royal New Zealand Air Force (RNZAF) at the Shepperton regatta in July 1945. Macdonald was coach and number six of a New Zealand Services eight assembled in mid-July that competed at a number of regattas during August. At the Hammersmith regatta, the New Zealand eight defeated a fancied Gladstone crew by one quarter of a boat length, but finished third in the final, 10 boat lengths behind the RAAF and Barnes club crews. A week later at Weybridge, the New Zealand Services eight was beaten by Barnes in the first heat, with the RAAF crew winning the final over Gladstone. Four of the oarsmen from the New Zealand Services eight, including Macdonald, competed as a four at the Greenwich regatta, winning their heat but being defeated in the final.

== Rugby union ==
Jack Macdonald
- Height: 1.85 m (6 ft 1 in)
- Weight: 85 kg (13 st 6 lb)

Rugby union career
- Position(s): Three-quarter; Full-back
Provincial / State sides
Years	Team	Apps	(Points)
1927	Manawhenua		
1928–35	Marlborough		
International career
Years	Team	Apps	(Points)
1926–35	New Zealand Māori		
1942	England Services		
1943–44	New Zealand Services		

=== Provincial ===
A three-quarter and full-back, Macdonald represented Manawhenua and Marlborough at a provincial level.

At the start of the 1927 season, Macdonald was transferred from Marlborough to Manawhenua. He scored the final try when Manawhenua wrested the Ranfurly Shield from Wairarapa 18–16 at Carterton on 6 August 1927. Macdonald played a "slashing game", scoring three tries in his team's second defence of the Ranfurly Shield, against Wanganui, with the holders running out the winners by 25 points to 6. Manawhenua lost the Ranfurly Shield to Canterbury 17–6 the following week.

=== North v South ===
In 1929, Macdonald represented the South Island in the inter-island match at Athletic Park, won by the North Island 29–20.

=== New Zealand Māori ===
Macdonald was selected for the New Zealand Māori tour of New Zealand, Australia, Ceylon, France, England, Wales and Canada in 1926–27. However, poor form and injury meant that he only played in nine matches. He was, however, described as having "a wonderful pair of hands as well as great pace."

He represented New Zealand Māori again in 1931 and 1934.

He was vice-captain of New Zealand Māori on their 1935 tour to Australia, the team winning nine of its 11 matches. George Nēpia believed that Macdonald should have been an automatic selection for the All Blacks team to tour the British Isles and Canada in 1935–36. However, he was not included in the touring party and subsequently defected to rugby league.

=== Wartime reinstatement ===
During World War II, Macdonald was reinstated to rugby union and he played for various forces teams in England. On 17 October 1942 he appeared for the RNZAF team in a match against Guy's Hospital, and reportedly gave a "brilliant display", scoring two tries and a conversion, as the New Zealanders won 11–0. Two weeks later, he again turned out for the RNZAF team, this time against the Welsh Guards at Richmond, kicking a conversion in his side's 8–6 victory. The following week he played on the wing for England in a services international against Wales at Swansea. He kicked a penalty goal in England's 11–7 defeat by the Welsh. Two weeks later he was in the Royal Air Force (RAF) team that was defeated 18–0 by the Army at Richmond. Macdonald started the game on the wing but moved into centre after the RAF captain went off injured after 25 minutes. He was a member of the New Zealand Combined Services team that was defeated by the RAF at Bedford 25–19 on 2 January 1943. The following month his Combined Services side beat the Royal Australian Air Force (RAAF) 8–5. Playing at full-back, Macdonald missed two penalty kicks at goal as the RNZAF was beaten by the RAAF 3–0 on 11 March 1944.

On 15 April 1944, Macdonald played full-back for the Māori team in a "Maoris v Pakeha" match at the Richmond Athletic Ground, with the Pākehā running out the winners by 13 points to 11.

The New Zealand Forces played a North Island v South Island match at Richmond on 30 September 1944. Macdonald kicked one penalty and one conversion for the South Island, but missed several other goal kicks in the North Island's 22–14 win. On 11 November 1944, Macdonald captained the New Zealand Services team as they were defeated 11–8 by South Africa Services. He crashed over for a try in the second half and kicked one penalty goal, but was unsuccessful with several other kicks at goal. The two teams met again two weeks later, with Macdonald once again captaining the New Zealand side. South Africa once again won, this time by 16 points to 8.

Macdonald retired from rugby in 1945.

== Rugby league ==
Jack Macdonald
Playing information
- Position: Three-quarters
Club
Years	Team	Pld	T	G	FG	P
1935–37	Streatham and Mitcham
	Huddersfield
	Rochdale Hornets
	Total	0	0	0	0	0

Macdonald changed rugby football codes from rugby union to rugby league in 1935, travelling to London on the SS Remuera to take up a professional contract with the newly formed Streatham and Mitcham club in London, alongside fellow New Zealand rugby defectors George Nēpia, Eddie Holder, Charlie Smith and George Harrison. When that club folded in 1937, he moved north and played for Huddersfield and later Rochdale Hornets. He also played for Halifax 1942–43 season.

In 1937 Macdonald played for the Dominions XIII in their 6–3 win over France.

He had an operation to remove cartilage from his right knee in 1939 and did not play professionally again.

Macdonald was instrumental in arranging contracts at Halifax for his younger brother Enoka Macdonald and nephew Mugwi Macdonald in 1948.

== Tennis ==
Macdonald was a member of the RNZAF tennis team that was beaten six matches to nil by the RAAF team at the All England Club at Wimbledon on 2 June 1945. A week later the RNZAF and South African Services met at Wimbledon, with the South Africans declared the winners 53 games to 51, after the match score was tied 3–3. Macdonald lost both his singles match and doubles match.

== Service in World War II ==
In World War II, Macdonald enlisted initially in the RAF and later served in the RNZAF. He was a leading aircraftman in February 1943, but by March 1944 he was a pilot officer, and by November 1944 he had been promoted to flying officer.

== Later life ==
Macdonald remained in England after the war and owned several restaurants in London. He returned to New Zealand in 1975 and died in Picton on 1 January 1982.

He was inducted into the Māori Sports Hall of Fame in 2008.
