= 2005 in New Zealand =

- Decades: 1980s; 1990s; 2000s; 2010s; 2020s
- See also: History of New Zealand; List of years in New Zealand; Timeline of New Zealand history

The following lists events that happened during 2005 in New Zealand.

At the beginning of 2005, the news was dominated by the recent "Boxing Day Tsunami". New Zealanders gave time and $25 million (money and goods) for relief in the areas affected.

The Foreshore and seabed legislation came into effect and was criticised by a UN committee.

The general election was the first contested by the Māori Party and Destiny New Zealand. It resulted in the continuation of the Fifth Labour Government of New Zealand.

== Population ==
- Estimated population as of 31 December: 4,161,000.
- Increase since 31 December 2004: 46,600 (1.13%).
- Males per 100 Females: 96.0.

== Incumbents ==
=== Regal and viceregal ===
- Head of State – Elizabeth II
- Governor-General – Dame Silvia Cartwright
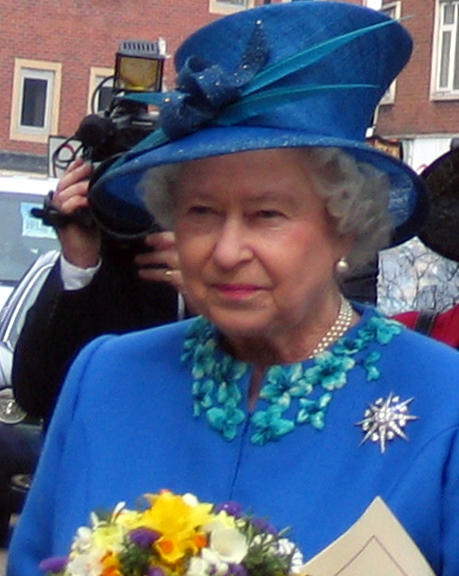
Elizabeth II

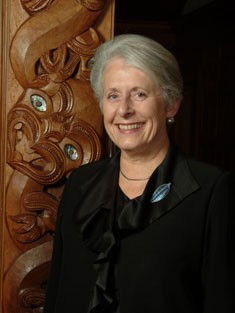
Dame Silva Cartwright

=== Government ===
The 47th New Zealand Parliament continued. Government was a coalition between Labour and the Progressives, with United Future supporting supply votes. At the 17 September election, the government arrangements changed considerably. The Labour-Progressive government is now supported by New Zealand First and United Future, both with their leader as a minister outside Cabinet.

- Speaker of the House – Jonathan Hunt (Labour) then Margaret Wilson (Labour)
- Prime Minister – Helen Clark (Labour)
- Deputy Prime Minister – Michael Cullen (Labour)
- Minister of Finance – Michael Cullen (Labour)
- Minister of Foreign Affairs during the 47th Parliament – Phil Goff (Labour)

Non-Labour ministers

- Jim Anderton (Progressives) (within Cabinet)
- Winston Peters (New Zealand First) – Minister of Foreign Affairs, Racing and Associate Minister of Senior Citizens during the 48th Parliament (outside Cabinet)
- Peter Dunne (United Future), Minister of Revenue and Associate Minister of Health during the 48th Parliament (outside Cabinet)
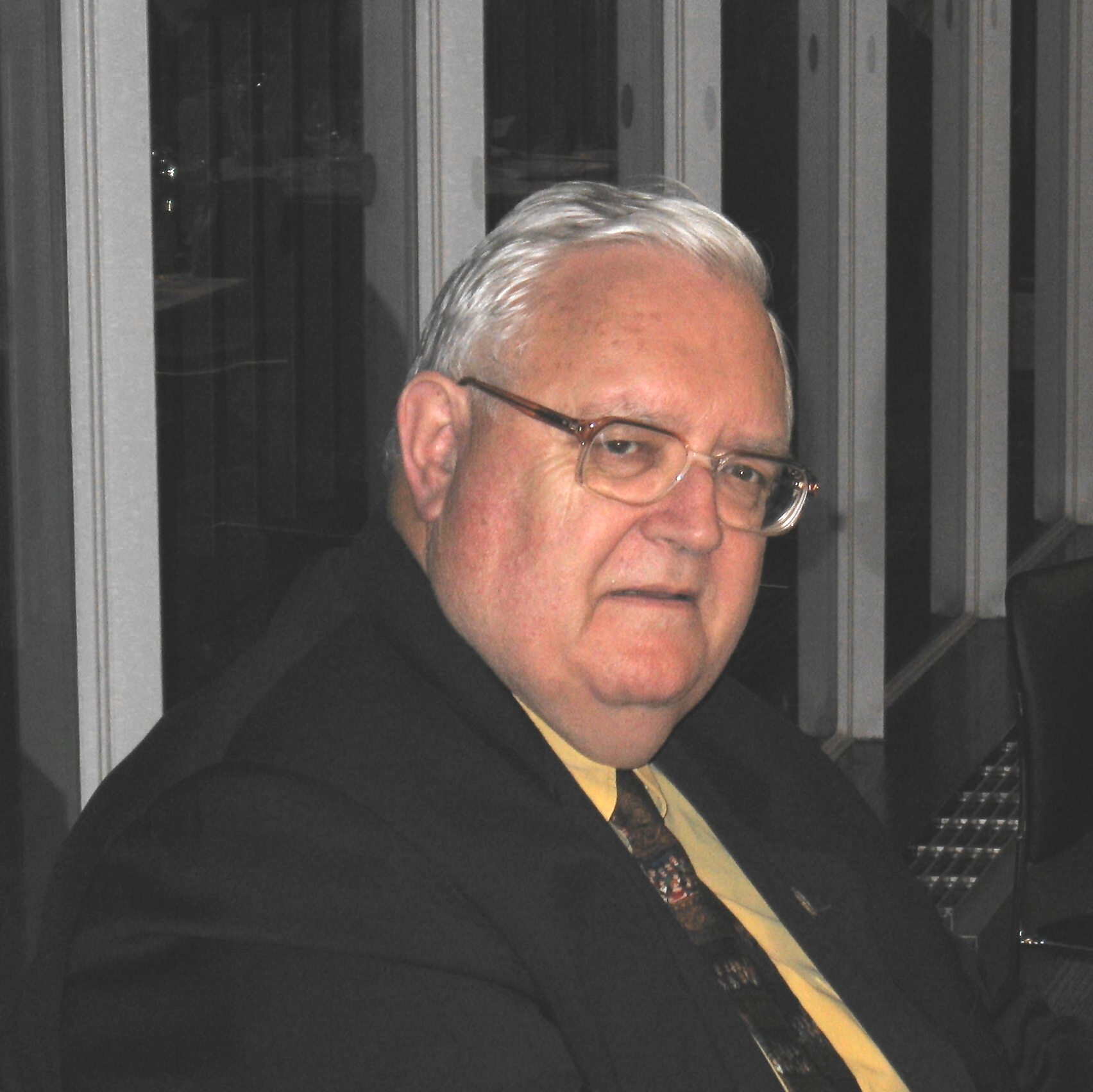
Jonathan Hunt

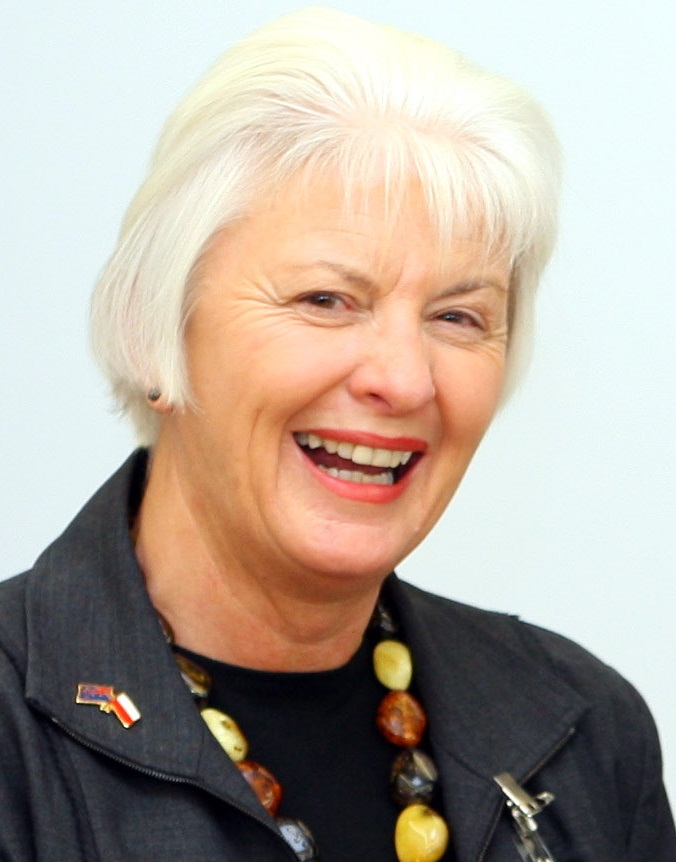
Margaret Wilson

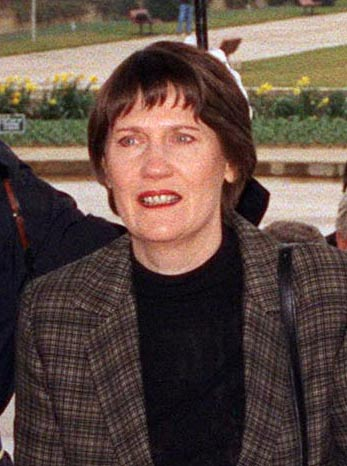
Helen Clark

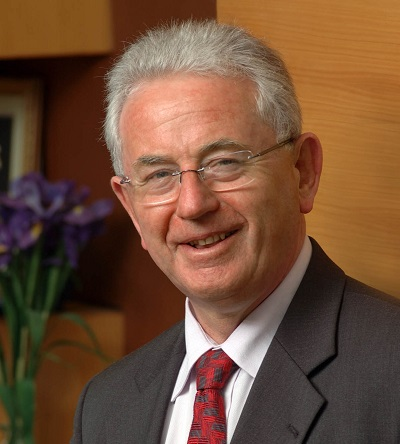
Michael Cullen

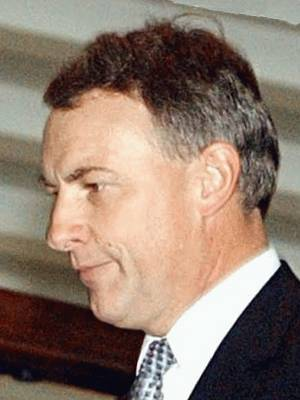
Phil Goff

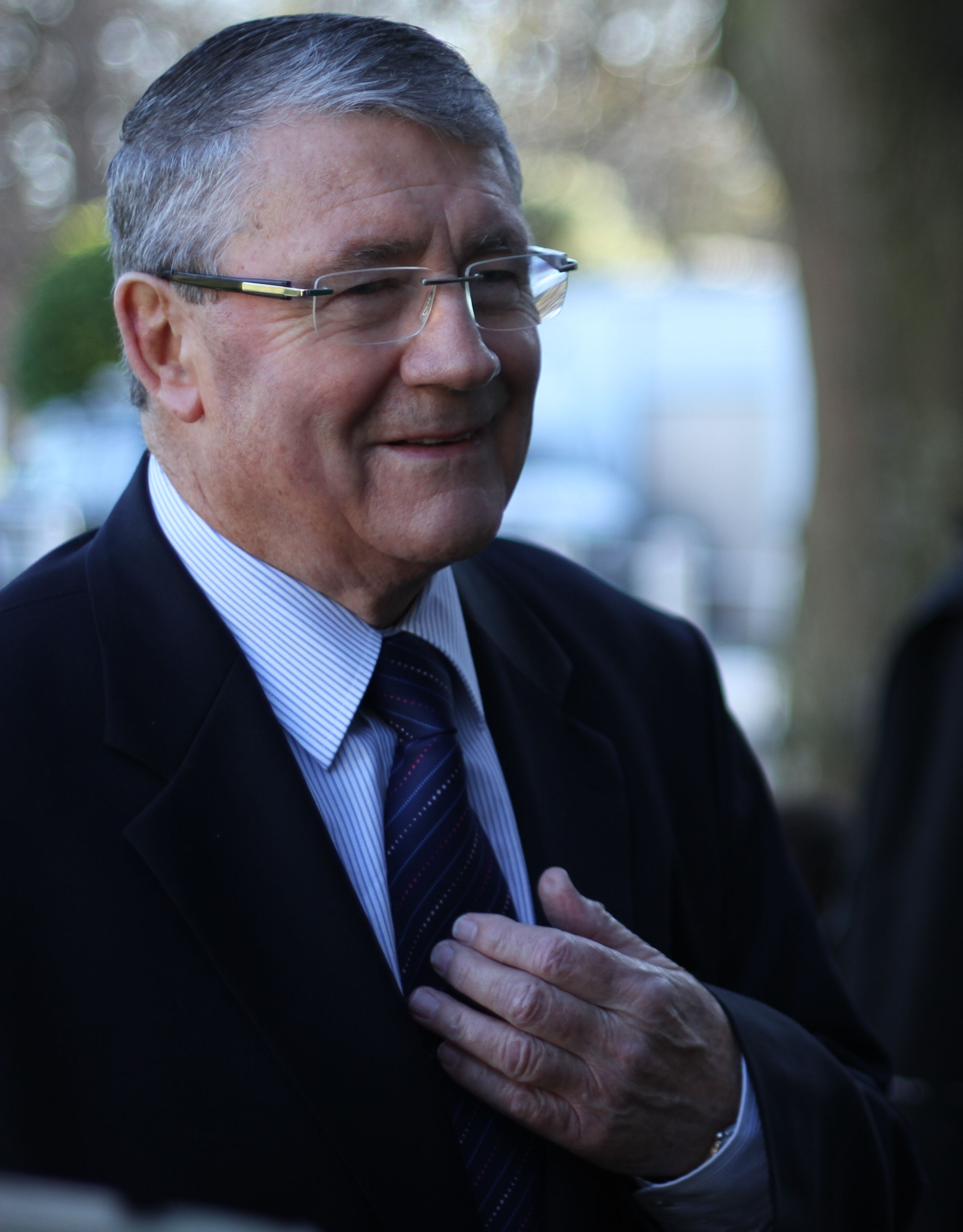
Jim Anderton

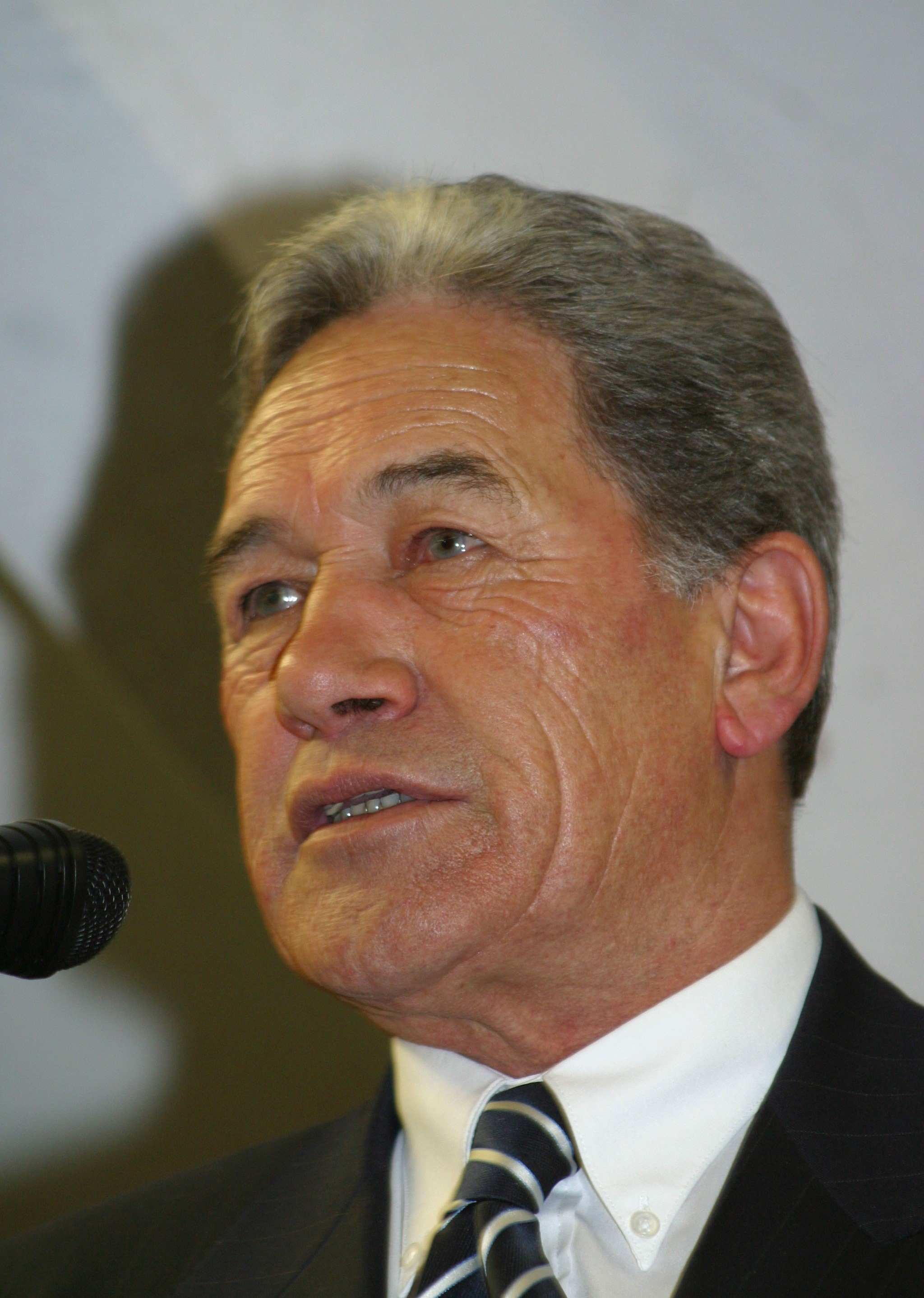
Winston Peters

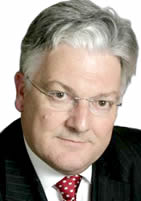
Peter Dunne

=== Opposition leaders ===
- National – Don Brash (Leader of the Opposition)
- Greens – Jeanette Fitzsimons and Rod Donald (until his death in November)
- Act – Rodney Hide
- New Zealand First – Winston Peters
- United Future – Peter Dunne
- Māori Party – Tariana Turia and Pita Sharples

=== Judiciary ===
- Chief Justice — Sian Elias
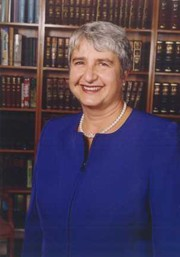
Dame Sian Elias

=== Main centre leaders ===
- Mayor of Auckland – Dick Hubbard
- Mayor of Tauranga – Stuart Crosby
- Mayor of Hamilton – Michael Redman
- Mayor of Wellington – Kerry Prendergast
- Mayor of Christchurch – Garry Moore
- Mayor of Dunedin – Peter Chin
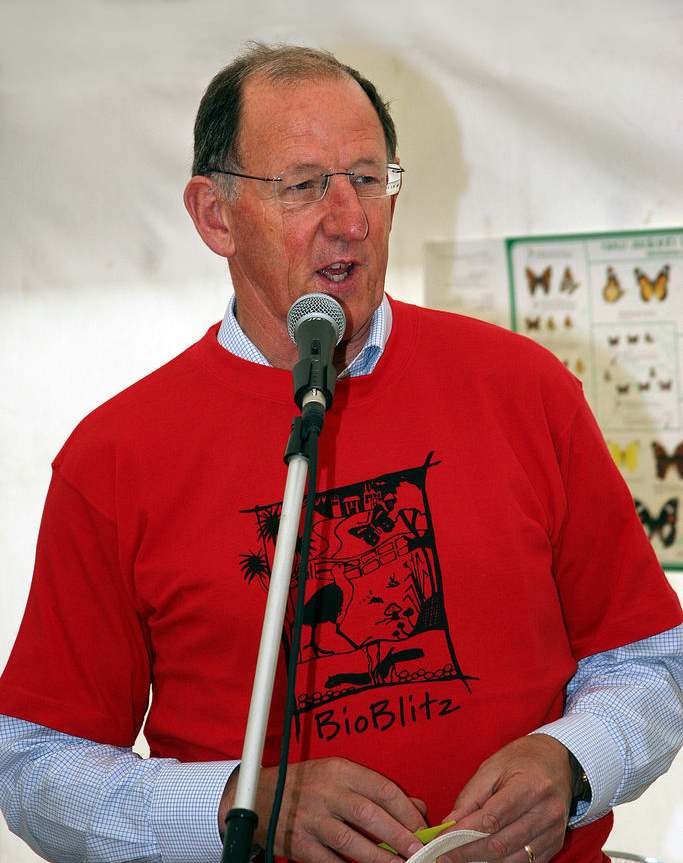
Dick Hubbard

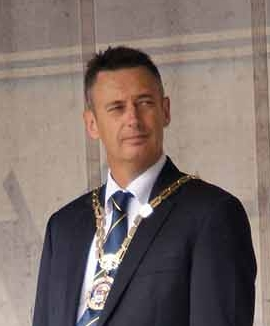
Stuart Crosby

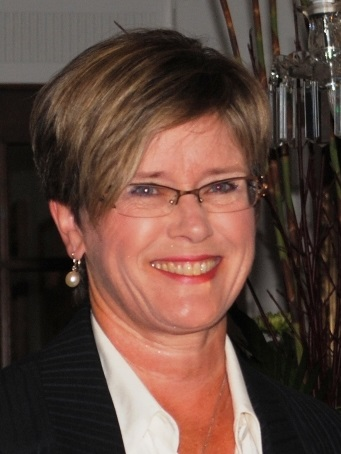
Kerry Prendergast

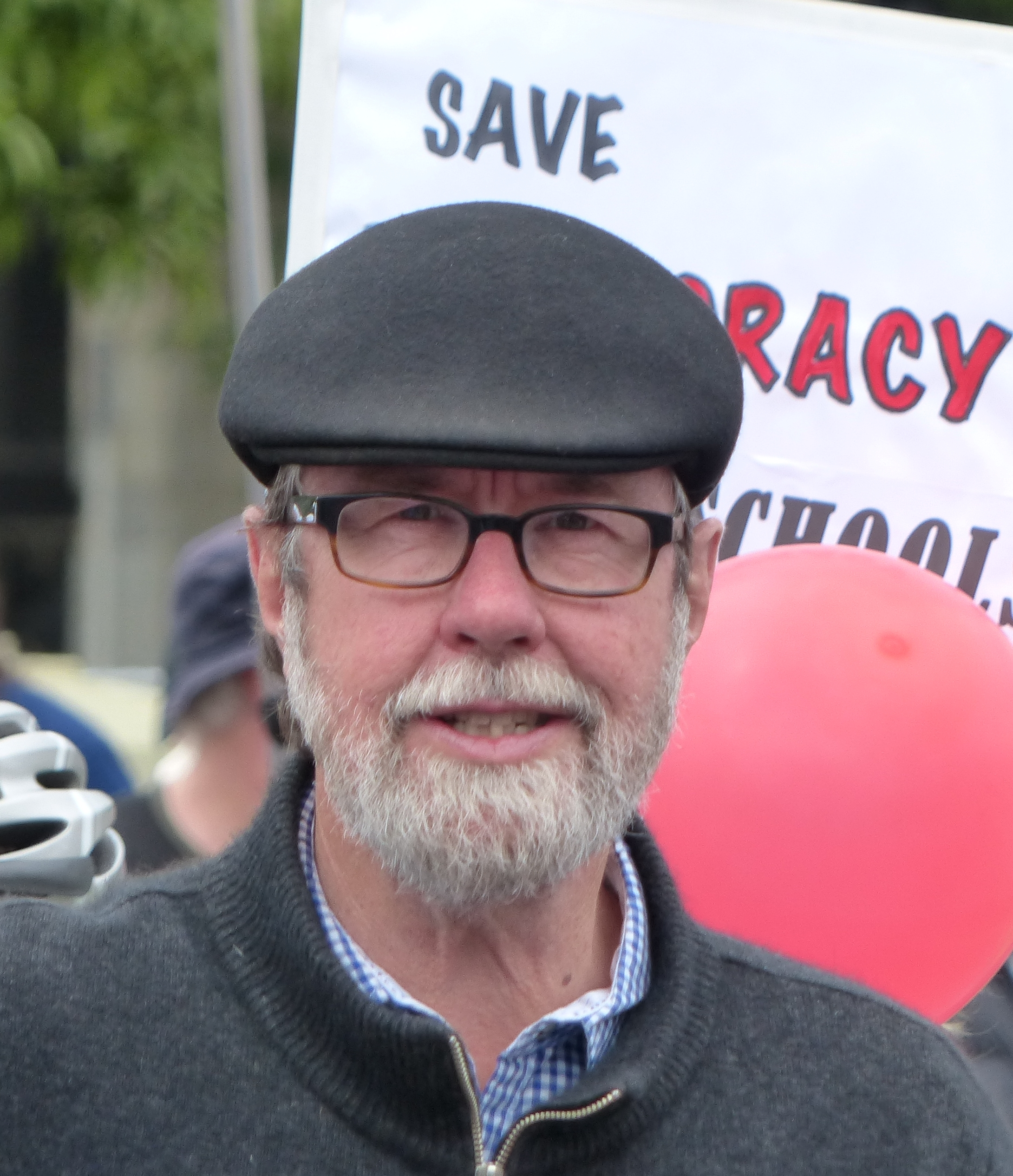
Garry Moore

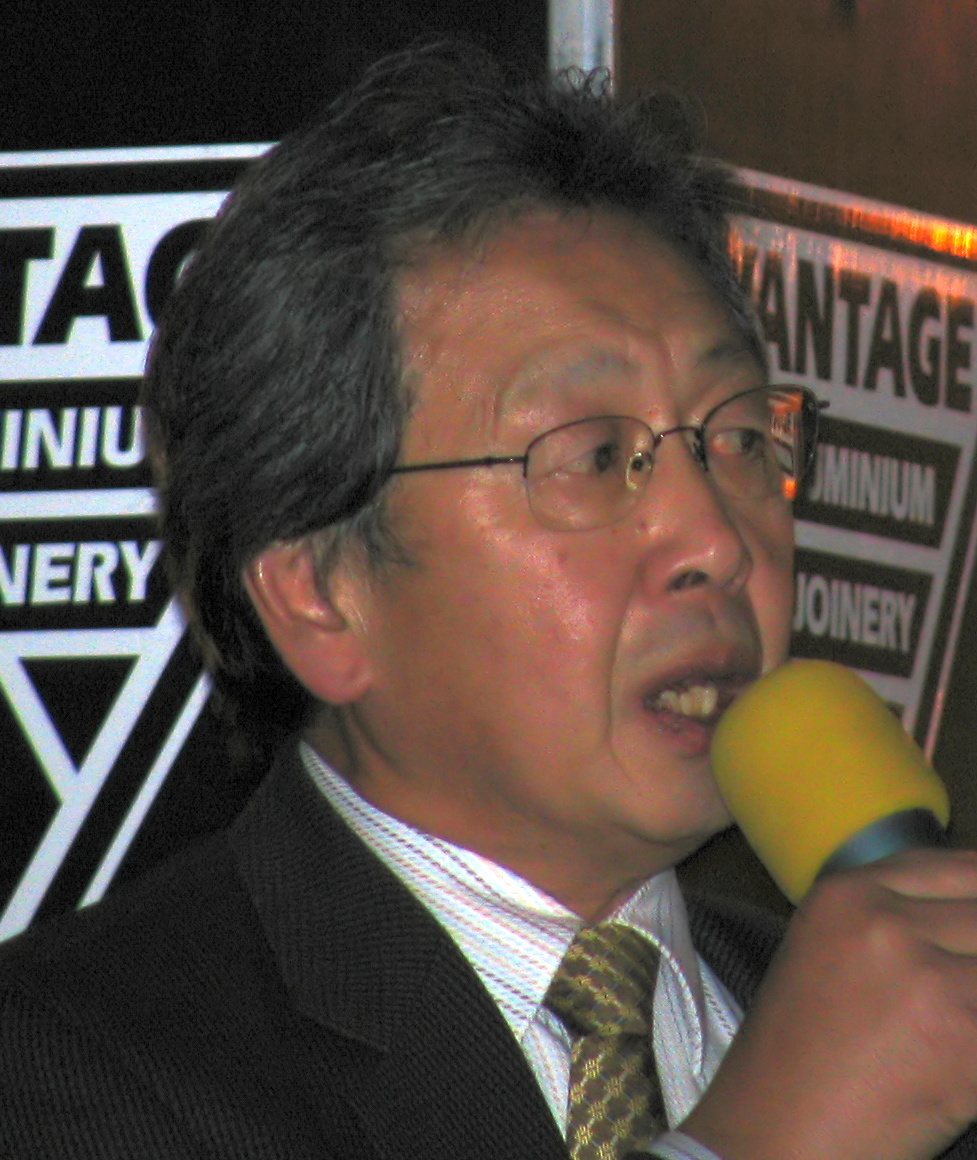
Peter Chin

== Events ==
=== January ===
- 16 January: National day of mourning for the victims of the 2004 Indian Ocean earthquake, including one minute's silence at 2:59 pm, exactly three weeks after the event.
- 17 January: The Foreshore and seabed legislation comes into effect.
- 25 January: Opposition leader Don Brash pledges to cut the number of working-age beneficiaries by one third over ten years. He plans to particularly reduce the number of solo parents on the Domestic Purposes Benefit.

=== February ===
- 22 February: Social Development minister Steve Maharey announces that seven benefits will be merged into one, with supplements available for accommodation, disability, and childcare. The benefits replaced include unemployment, sickness, disability, and the domestic purposes benefit. The new benefit will apply from 2007 but trial areas will pilot the scheme from May 2005.

=== March ===
- 5–10 March: The Prince of Wales (now Charles III) tours New Zealand. The most controversial incident was two women baring their breasts to him, in protest against a misreported objection by the Prince to a topless Aborigine dance in Australia, and the temporary closure of a breast cancer screening caravan due to security concerns during the visit.
- 12 March: The United Nations Committee on the Elimination of Racial Discrimination states that the Foreshore and seabed legislation discriminates against Māori by extinguishing the possibility of establishing Māori customary title over the foreshore and seabed, and by not providing a means of redress.
- March: Easter road toll the highest for several years.

=== April ===
- 4 April: Government member of parliament John Tamihere is involved in a major scandal after speaking candidly and scathingly about his fellow Labour MPs to a reporter (an interview which Tamihere claims was off-the-record). Further details of comments made at the interview were released a week later.
- 12 April: John Tamihere is censured by the Labour Party caucus for his earlier comments, but was not asked to resign from the party.
- 21 April: Bus drivers in Auckland working for Stagecoach have voted to strike for six days from 5 May in support of their claim for an extra $2 an hour.
- 21 April: 700 coal miners strike for the day in the first national coal miners' strike in New Zealand for more than a decade. The miners want a 6% wage increase, but their employer, Solid Energy, is offering 2.8%.
- 26 April: The Civil Unions and Relationships Acts come into force. These Acts allow same-sex and de facto couples to form legal unions similar to marriage.

=== May ===
- 3 May: An Airwork Fairchild Metro III explodes while flying from Auckland to Woodbourne, about 5 km east of Stratford. The plane had two pilots and was carrying courier parcels. Both men were killed. Residents in the area report hearing a loud noise, with some seeing a fireball and falling debris. Wreckage is spread over a 15 km area.
- 6 May: A bridge near Wairoa on the East Coast of the North Island collapsed sending two train wagons and a crane on the East Coast into the Nūhaka River 9 metres below. The accident which happened at about 7:30 am NZST and there was nobody on board the wagons or crane.
- 6 May: Graeme Fraser, the chairman of the New Zealand Qualifications Authority resigns after State Services Commission report into the 2004 NCEA scholarship exams. There was a wide discrepancy between the number of scholarships awarded in Arts subjects compared to Science subjects. The report laid most of the blame on NZQA. It said they failed to "see that wide variability in scholarship results could undermine the credibility of the exams".
- 10 May: A letter sent to the New Zealand prime minister alleges that foot and mouth disease has been released on Waiheke Island. The letter writer threatens further releases unless tax reforms are made. While the letter is considered likely to be a hoax, a farm on Waiheke is quarantined. New Zealand has been free of the foot and mouth virus to date.
- 14 May: Telecom New Zealand is planning to increase security for its voicemail service after a hacker managed to access the voicemail famous New Zealanders such as Dick Hubbard, Auckland mayor. Telecom's public affairs manager was only aware that his own voicemail had been accessed after being told by a computer journalist. The voicemail of several policemen was accessed.
- 17 May: David Benson-Pope stands down as New Zealand's Associate Education Minister after three people alleged that he had administered cruel punishments to them while he was a high-school teacher in Dunedin. Benson-Pope has previously denied the allegations in Parliament.
- 18 May: Fierce storms lash the Bay of Plenty, forcing the declaration of a state of emergency and the evacuation of homes in Tauranga and Matatā.
- 24 May: The appeal of six Pitcairn men who were sentenced for sexual abuse of young girls fails. An Auckland court has continued their bail until their appeal to the Privy Council is heard, most likely in April 2006. (BBC)

=== June ===
- 2 June: New Zealand electricity supplier Meridian Energy announces plans to build one of the world's largest wind farms at Mākara, west of Wellington. The farm is planned to have 70 turbines, each over 100 metres high, and to generate 210 MW, which would be sufficient to power the whole of Wellington, Porirua, and Lower Hutt.
- 4 June: At the start of the Queen's Birthday long weekend in New Zealand, rain, snow and ice closed several major highways. State Highway 1 (known as the Desert Road) was closed in the morning between Waiouru and Rangipo in the central North Island, and State Highway 4 between Wanganui and Taumarunui was also closed for some time. A series of slips in the Manawatū Gorge has caused delays to traffic. The year's first major snowfall in Dunedin has caused problems for motorists there.
- 10 June: New Zealand MP Sue Bradford introduces a private member's bill to outlaw the smacking of children. The present law requires that physical discipline of a child use no more than "reasonable force". As a private member's bill, this will be a conscience vote.
- 14 June: The New Zealand High Commissioner to Canada, Graham Kelly, apologises to all New Zealanders for remarks he made to a Canadian Senate committee in April. Kelly insulted Māori, Pacific Islanders and Asian immigrants to New Zealand in an attempt at humour.
- 18 June: Brian Tamaki, leader of the Destiny Church, was ordained as a bishop on the church's seventh birthday.
- 20: June Two fibre-optic cables failed in the southern North Island of New Zealand, cutting Telecom New Zealand's cellular and internet services, disrupting EFTPOS transactions, and closing the New Zealand Stock Exchange for five hours.
- 22 June: 500 residents of the town of Tākaka in the northern South Island are evacuated after a major fire at the town's dairy factory. Evacuation was through fear of an explosion in vats containing caustic soda and sulphuric acid, which could have released toxic gases.
- 24 June: The New Zealand cricket team announced that it would tour Zimbabwe in August, despite calls for a boycott due to Operation Murambatsvina. The New Zealand government will not stop the tour going to Zimbabwe, but says a return tour by the Zimbabwe team will not be welcome.
- 26 June: The Israeli Foreign Minister, Silvan Shalom, apologises to New Zealand for the actions of two Israeli citizens, believed to be Mossad agents, who attempted to gain New Zealand passports under false pretences in 2004. The apology allows diplomatic relations between the two countries to return to normal.
- 30 June: Prince William arrives in New Zealand for an 11-day tour. This was his second trip to New Zealand; he was nine months old on his first visit. During the visit he follows the Lion's tour and has several official engagements.
- June and July: The British & Irish Lions rugby tour of New Zealand. The tourists lost all three Test matches to the All Blacks, but won all their other games except the one against New Zealand Māori.

=== July ===
- 7 July: The High Court of New Zealand rules that the delays in processing Unitec's application to become a university breach the New Zealand Bill of Rights and that the application should have been considered in 2000.
- 14 July: Graham Capill, former leader of Christian Heritage Party, is sentenced for nine years for sexual abuse of 3 young girls.
- 16 July: Bishops of the Catholic Church in New Zealand call for the boycott of the CanWest television channels C4TV and TV3 in protest against C4TV's showing of the irreverent cartoon Popetown.
- 17 July: Heavy rain causes flooding in the Coromandel Peninsula of New Zealand, leaving the holiday town of Pauanui cut off when part of the access road washes away.
- 18 July: Air New Zealand is forced to cancel about 30% of its international flights after flight attendants begin the first of a series of 48-hour strikes. The third strike was called off but flights will not return to normal until Tuesday 26 July.
- 24 July: Former Prime Minister David Lange is in a serious but stable condition at Middlemore Hospital. Lange has suffered from amyloidosis for some years.
- 25 July: The date of the 2005 New Zealand general election is set for Saturday 17 September.
- 31 July: The New Zealand First party launches its 2005 New Zealand general election campaign with a promise that no pre-election coalition deal will be made. Party leader Winston Peters says the campaign issues are immigration, law and order, senior citizens, trade, and Māori affairs.
- 26 July: The New Zealand Parliament voted by a substantial margin to ask the New Zealand cricket team to abandon next month's tour of Zimbabwe.
- 30 July: Shelley Mather, the New Zealand woman killed in the 7 July 2005 London bombings, has her funeral at St Matthew-in-the-City in Auckland. Prime Minister Helen Clark attends.

=== August ===
- 3 August: Staff at several universities continue to take strike action in support of their five per cent wage claim. The University of Otago is the only major university to have settled with their staff.
- 3 August: Radio New Zealand staff stopped work for two hours in support of their claim for a five percent wage increase and an extra week's annual holiday. (Stuff)
- 4 August: The Labour Party specifies 2008 as the deadline for claims to the Waitangi Tribunal, and settlement completion by 2020. The National Party requires claims to be filed by next year and all settlements completed by 2010. (Stuff) (Channel News Asia) (BBC)
- 11 August: Two minor parties succeed in forcing TV3 to include their leaders in an election debate for the New Zealand general election. United Future leader Peter Dunne gained much of his party's current standing at the previous election's equivalent debate.
- 13 August: Former Prime Minister David Lange dies from complications of diabetes and renal failure. (Newtalk ZB)
- 14 August: The Green Party launches its election campaign. Co-Leader Jeanette Fitzsimons offers a Labour-Green coalition, and promises free annual health checks for all New Zealanders.
- 14 August: The Progressive Party launches its election campaign calling for a three-way coalition with Labour and the Greens. The party is proud of its achievements in the last three years, including the formation of Kiwibank and the introduction of four weeks annual leave.
- 19 August: Two police officers and a civilian driver are convicted on driving charges after a high-speed convoy in July 2004 carried the New Zealand Prime Minister, Helen Clark to Christchurch airport. Clark claimed not to be aware of the speed involved, but most New Zealanders are sceptical.
- 20 August: United Future New Zealand launches its campaign with attacks on the New Zealand First and Green parties. United Future will not continue its support for Labour if it is in a coalition with the Greens.
- 21 August: Don Brash launches the New Zealand National Party election campaign saying that lower taxes and better incentives are the key to reigniting a spirit of enterprise and making New Zealand again a land of opportunity.
- 21 August: The New Zealand Labour Party appeals to voters to reject the politics of division and fear in its campaign launch for the general election. Helen Clark has made seven "pledge-card" promises as the basis of its campaign.
- 22 August: The two major parties in the New Zealand election both promise tax cuts if they are elected. Labour offers $1.3 billion worth of tax cuts targeted at families, while National offers $3.9 billion across all tax brackets, and a reduction in company tax to 30%.
- 23 August: A 14-year-old boy is arrested for the murder of Chris Currie, who died when a piece of concrete was dropped on his car from an Auckland motorway overbridge.
- 23 August: Former ACT New Zealand MP Donna Awatere Huata is found guilty of fraud after using money from a state-funded reading programme for personal expenses. She was expelled from Parliament in November 2004 after a lengthy battle.
- 23 August: The Māori Party launches its campaign for the general election with co-leader Dr Pita Sharples suggesting that the party would not form a coalition with a major party, but would offer support to a government on a case by case basis.

=== September ===
- 3 September: The New Zealand team wins four gold medals in the five events they entered in the World Rowing Championships in Gifu, Japan.
- 3 September: The All Blacks defeat Australia's Wallabies 34-24 in the final match of the 2005 Tri Nations Series, and win the title for the sixth time. (SMH)
- 4 September: The ACT party kicks off its election campaign with Rodney Hide claiming that the only way National can form a government is with its help.
- 8 September: Don Brash, leader of the New Zealand National Party, admits that he knew about anonymous pamphlets distributed by members of the Exclusive Brethren attacking the Labour and Green Parties.
- 10 September: New Zealand sold the Skyhawk ground attack and Aermacchi trainer aircraft to an unnamed American company. The planes were put into storage after the disbanding of the Air Force combat wing in 2001.
- 14 September: The Ombudsman forces Treasury to release details of alternative costings for the Labour Party's proposed interest-free student loan scheme. Treasury estimated the scheme would cost $390 million in its third year, but Labour's estimates put the cost at $300 million at that point.
- 14 September: Winston Peters reveals old sexual harassment allegations against his National Party rival in Tauranga, Bob Clarkson. Clarkson claims the allegations were the result of a misunderstanding, but talks about his crotch to a female reporter. (Stuff)
- 15 September: The centre of Tauranga is shut down for 13 hours after a man threatens to blow himself up with a bomb in a hotel. The man, who was upset that he could not get a visa to stay in New Zealand, was arrested just after midnight. The bomb was fake. (Stuff)
- 17 September: A light plane, stolen from Ardmore Airport in Auckland, crashes in the Waitematā Harbour near St Heliers, after the pilot threatens to crash into the Sky Tower.
- 17 September: General election: election night figures give Labour 50 seats, National 49, New Zealand First 7, Greens 6, Māori Party 4 (all electorate seats, an overhang of 2 because party vote earned them only 2), United Future 3, ACT 2, Progressives 1. National leader Don Brash refuses to concede defeat because there are over 200,000 special votes to be counted. (Elections New Zealand)
- 20 September: Helen Clark orders an inquiry into Associate Justice Minister Taito Phillip Field's assistance to a Thai overstayer's work permit application. The Thai man retiled the roof of Field's house in Samoa.
- 24 September: A flotilla of 100 boats meets the Interisland ferry Challenger (Kaitaki) protesting the speed it travels through the Marlborough Sounds. Protesters claim the ferry's wake damages the shoreline. (Stuff)
- 25 September: Green MP Keith Locke walks down Broadway wearing only socks, shoes, a G-string, and body paint, to fulfill a promise he rashly made during the election campaign.
- 30 September: Donna Awatere Huata, a former ACT Member of Parliament, is sentenced to two years nine months in jail for stealing from a Māori trust for disadvantaged children. Her husband is sentenced to two years.

=== October ===
- 1 October: General election special votes are counted and announced: National drops to 48 seats, others unchanged (as the Māori Party vote share raised its quota to 3, thus overhang of 1). Helen Clark confident she can form a government within 2 weeks. (NZ election results)
- 4 October: Three existing Cabinet Ministers, George Hawkins, Paul Swain and Marian Hobbs, announce they will not be seeking new Cabinet posts once a new government is formed.
- 5 October: TVNZ announces it will not renew the NZ$800,000 contract of its newsreader, Judy Bailey, who has presented ONE News for 18 years and has been called "The Mother of the Nation".
- 6 October: A New Zealand District Court rules that HIV-positive people need not tell sexual partners about their status so long as safe sex is practised. (NZ Herald) (Stuff)
- 14 October: Divers from New Zealand's National Institute of Water and Atmospheric Research (NIWA) examine the port of Picton for signs of sea squirts, an invasive species which could wreck the mussel farming industry. Sea squirts have also been found at Auckland and Lyttelton.
- 15 October: The Kiwis inflict a surprise defeat on the Australian Kangaroos in the Tri Nations rugby league tournament, defeating Australia in Sydney for the first time since 1959. (ABC News)
- 17 October: Helen Clark announces the formation of a Labour-led Government. The Progressive Party is in coalition. New Zealand First and United Future support the government and are each given ministerial positions outside Cabinet.
- 19 October: Helen Clark announces the Cabinet of New Zealand members. Deputy Prime Minister Michael Cullen retains Finance and takes Tertiary Education. Jim Anderton is now the third ranked minister, responsible for Agriculture, Fisheries and Forestry. Annette King takes Police.
- 19 October: Transparency International ranks New Zealand second equal on its list of least corrupt countries in the world. Australia ranks ninth. (Transparency International)
- 30 October: Ian Fraser resigns as CEO of Television New Zealand after the board of directors insists he become involved in negotiations over salaries of top news presenters.

=== November ===
- 4 November: An iconic statue, Pania of the reef, stolen from Napier on 27 October, is recovered and two people are charged with the theft. (NZ Herald)
- 14 November: A researcher for the United Nations Committee on the Elimination of Racial Discrimination requests permission to visit New Zealand to determine whether the foreshore and seabed law breaches Māori rights. (NZ Herald)
- 16 November: Nándor Tánczos is sworn in to replace Rod Donald in Parliament.
- 18 November: New Zealand was announced as the host for the 2011 Rugby Union World Cup after unexpectedly beating bids by South Africa and Japan.
- 19 November: Sky Television purchases Prime Television for $30 million. Sky will use Prime to advertise its pay content and to show delayed broadcasts of sports events. (NZ Herald)
- 20 November: New Zealand's last resident World War I veteran, Bob Rudd, dies aged 104 on the West Coast. Rudd lied about his age to join the British Army and immigrated to New Zealand after the war. (NZ Herald)
- 27 November: The All Blacks complete a Grand Slam by defeating England, Ireland, Scotland and Wales in a single tour. The last grand slam was by Australia in 1984. (Mail & Guardian)

=== December ===
- 8 December: One year after the Smokefree Environments Amendment Act was passed, the Asthma and Respiratory Foundation releases a report showing that there has been no reduction in the number of bar patrons or bar takings. There has been an increase in the number of non-smokers at bars and cafes. Rural pubs may have suffered a loss of patronage. (Stuff).
- 9 December: To control the spread of the Didymo algae, the whole of the South Island is declared a controlled area. All items, such as boats, fishing gear, clothing, and vehicles, that have been in a stream, river or lake, must be cleaned before they enter another waterway.
- 14 December: King Kong, Peter Jackson's remake of the classic movie about a giant ape, premiers in Wellington. King Kong was filmed in New Zealand. (NZ Herald)
- 15 December: The first successful prosecution under the Smokefree Environments Amendment Act at the Timaru District Court. The defendant, Geoff Mulvihill, received a NZ$9,000 fine (and $6000 in costs).
- 15 December: Bob Clarkson keeps his electorate seat, after the High Court rejects Winston Peters' petition alleging he had spent more on campaigning for the seat of Tauranga than is allowed under the Electoral Act. The Act prescribes a campaign spending limit of $20,000 per local candidate. Peters' petition alleged that Clarkson had spent more than $100,000. The High Court found that he had spent only $18,159. (NZ Herald)
- 19 December: Air New Zealand makes 110 staff redundant in Auckland as it prepares to outsource most of its heavy maintenance. A further 507 staff will find out the status of their jobs in February 2006.
- 21 December: The Government abandons the proposed carbon tax after the New Zealand First and United Future parties opposed it. The Government says the tax would not be effective at lowering emissions. The tax was supposed to help New Zealand meet its obligations under the Kyoto Protocol.
- 21 December: The minimum wage will increase from NZ$9.50 to $10.25 per hour for adults, and from $7.60 to $8.20 for under-18-year-olds. The increases take effect on 27 March 2006. (NZ Herald)
- 27 December: The Treaty House at Waitangi is superficially damaged when a man drives a car into it. The Treaty of Waitangi was signed in the grounds of this house, and it has been the focus of protests over recent decades. (Stuff)

=== Other ===
- Horoirangi Marine Reserve was established

== Arts and literature ==
=== Awards ===
- Catherine Chidgey wins the Robert Burns Fellowship.
- Montana New Zealand Book Awards
  - Montana Medal: Douglas Lloyd Jenkins, At Home: A Century of New Zealand Design
  - Deutz Medal: Patricia Grace, Tu
  - Reader's Choice: Julie Le Clerc and John Bougen, Made in Morocco
  - First Book Awards:
    - Fiction: Julian Novitz, My Real Life and Other Stories
    - Poetry: Sonja Yelich, Clung
    - Non-fiction: Douglas Wright, Ghost Dance
- 5 October: 2005 New Zealand Music Awards

=== Performing arts ===
- Benny Award presented by the Variety Artists Club of New Zealand to Elaine Bracey.

=== Television ===
- Outrageous Fortune
- Insider's Guide To Love
- Seven Periods with Mr Gormsby
- Campbell Live
- Frontier of Dreams
- New Zealand's Top 100 History Makers
- Paul Holmes leaves TVNZ and moves to Prime.

=== Radio ===
- Radio Live begins broadcasting nationwide.
- More FM brand is rolled out nationwide after RadioWorks rebrands heritage stations falling under the LocalWorks brand as More FM.

=== Film ===
- The World's Fastest Indian
- River Queen
- King Kong
- Boogeyman
- The Chronicles of Narnia: The Lion, the Witch and the Wardrobe
- 50 Ways of Saying Fabulous

=== Internet ===
- 8 February: Te Ara, the National Encyclopedia of New Zealand, is launched in English and Māori.

== Sport ==
=== Athletics ===
- Matt Dravitski wins his first national title in the men's marathon, clocking 2:22:03 on 5 June in Christchurch, while Shireen Crumpton claims her first as well in the women's championship (2:37:24).

=== Basketball ===
- The National Basketball League won by the Auckland Stars, who beat the Hawkes Bay Hawks, 89-68 in the final
- The Women’s National Basketball League was won by the Canterbury Wildcats who beat the Otago Breakers 83-69 in the final

=== Cricket ===
- March: New Zealand cricket team beaten in test and ODI series by Australia.
- December: New Zealand cricket team beaten 2–1 in an ODI series for the Chappell-Hadlee trophy, but New Zealand sets a world record by successfully chasing a target of 332 runs in the final game.

=== Golf ===
- 20 June (19 June in the USA) – Michael Campbell becomes only the second New Zealander to win a major championship in golf, winning the U.S. Open by two strokes over Tiger Woods.

=== Horse racing ===
==== Harness racing ====
- New Zealand Trotting Cup: Mainland Banner
- Auckland Trotting Cup: Howard Bromac

=== Rowing ===
- 3 September: The New Zealand team wins four gold medals in the five events they entered in the World Rowing Championships in Gifu, Japan.

=== Rugby league ===
- Bartercard Cup won by Mt Albert Lions
- 27 November – The Kiwis defeat the Australian Kanagroos 24-0 in the final of the rugby league tri-nations championship. (The third team being Great Britain).

=== Rugby union ===
- 9 July – The All Blacks complete a 3–0 whitewash of the touring British & Irish Lions.
- 3 September: The All Blacks defeat Australia's Wallabies 34-24 in the final match of the 2005 Tri Nations Series, and win the title for the sixth time.
- 27 November – The All Blacks defeat Scotland at Edinburgh to become only the second All Black touring team to complete the "Grand Slam" of rugby – beating Wales, Ireland, England and Scotland on one tour (the first being in 1978).

=== Shooting ===
- Ballinger Belt – John Whiteman (Upper Hutt)

=== Soccer ===
- Inaugural year of the New Zealand Football Championship won by Auckland City FC
- The Chatham Cup is won by Central United (Auckland) who beat Palmerston North Marist 2–1 in the final.

== Births ==
- 5 January – Xavier Tito-Harris, rugby union player
- 11 January – Vivian Yang, tennis player
- 18 January – Karl Oloapu, rugby league player
- 20 January – Dontae Russo-Nance, basketball player
- 27 January – Tyler Bindon, association footballer
- 18 March – Lukas Kelly-Heald, association footballer
- 27 March – Dane Menzies, snowboarder
- 5 May – Riana Pho, field hockey player
- 7 August – Ethan Olivier, triple jumper
- 4 September – Adama Coulibaly, association footballer
- 23 September – Gustav Legnavsky, freestyle skier
- 11 October – Ruby Nathan, association footballer
- 1 November – Milly Clegg, association footballer

== Deaths ==
=== January ===
- 2 January – John Ziman, physicist and humanist
- 12 January – John Brown, cricket umpire (born 1928)
- 15 January – Terry Crowley, linguistics academic (born 1953)
- 19 January – Bill Andersen, trade union leader (born 1924)
- 21 January – Neville Scott, athlete (born 1935)

=== February ===
- 4 February – Barbara Angus, diplomat, historian (born 1924)
- 14 February – Albert Harris, orchestrator, arranger and composer (born 1916)
- 16 February – Margaret Milne, potter (born 1917)
- 26 February – Ian Colquhoun, cricketer (born 1924)
- 28 February – Phil Fuemana, musician (born 1964)

=== March ===
- 4 March – Douglas Dumbleton, cricket player and umpire (born 1918)
- 9 March – Brian Turner, naval officer (born 1915)
- 15 March – Marilyn Pryor, anti-abortion advocate (born 1936)
- 27 March – Richard Kearney, jurist (born 1930)

=== April ===
- 1 April – Greg Aim, cricketer, sports and arts administrator (born 1933)
- 4 April – Mark Beban, cricketer (born 1940)
- 12 April – Kevin Stuart, rugby union player (born 1928)
- 19 April – What A Nuisance, thoroughbred racehorse (foaled 1978)
- 23 April – Joh Bjelke-Petersen, Queensland politician (born 1911)

=== May ===
- 1 May – Rex Bergstrom, econometrics academic (born 1925)
- 8 May – Ellis Child, cricketer (born 1925)
- 11 May – Bob Stuart, rugby union player and administrator (born 1920)
- 12 May – Ivan Walsh, association football player (born 1924)
- 12 May – Owen Wilkes, peace campaigner (born 1940)
- 20 May – Jack Dodd, physics academic (born 1922)
- 23 May – Roderick Wright, Scottish Roman Catholic bishop (born 1940)
- 29 May – Admiral Sir Gordon Tait, naval officer (born 1921)

=== June ===
- 12 June – Sonja Davies, trade unionist, peace campaigner and politician (born 1923)
- 14 June – Sir Tom Clark, industrialist, yachting patron (born 1916)
- 17 June – Jonathan Elworthy, politician (born 1936)
- 20 June – Arthur Hughes, rugby union player, businessman, horse racing administrator (born 1924)
- 21 June – Larry Sutherland, politician (born 1951)

=== July ===
- 2 July - Mary Watt, landscape architect (born 1917)
- 4 July – Theo de Lange, air force officer (born 1914)
- 11 July
  - Sir John Kennedy-Good, politician, mayor of Lower Hutt (1970–86) (born 1915)
  - Hugh Sheridan, boxer (born 1920)
- 13 July – June Chamberlain, long jumper (born 1933)
- 14 July – J. B. Trapp, history academic (born 1925)
- 15 July – Dick Haggie, rugby league player (born 1933)
- 21 July – Nick Unkovich, lawn bowler (born 1923)
- 24 July – John Drawbridge, artist (born 1930)
- 25 July – Tūngia Baker, actor, weaver (born 1939)
- 30 July – Jack McLean, rugby union and rugby league player (born 1923)

=== August ===
- 1 August – Peter Turner, photographer and writer (born 1947)
- 5 August – Roy Scott, cricketer (born 1917)
- 8 August – Bob Binning, fencer (born 1935)
- 13 August – David Lange, politician, Prime Minister of New Zealand (1984–89) (born 1942)
- 15 August – Dame Evelyn Stokes, historical geography academic, Waitangi Tribunal member (born 1936)
- 16 August – Kevin Smith, conservationist (born 1953)
- 29 August – Jack Luxton, dairy farmer, politician (born 1923)

=== September ===
- 29 September
  - Victor du Chateau, cricketer (born 1911)
  - Bruce Stewart, television scriptwriter (born 1925)

=== October ===
- 4 October – John Falloon, politician (born 1942)
- 14 October – Peter Brown, artist

=== November ===
- 6 November – Rod Donald, politician, co-leader of the Green Party (born 1957)
- 9 November – Tama Poata, actor, filmmaker, human rights activist (born 1936)
- 10 November – Kristian Fredrikson, stage and costume designer (born 1940)
- 20 November – Bob Rudd, New Zealand's last resident World War I veteran (born 1901)
- 29 November
  - Mick Holland, speedway rider (born 1918)
  - Stan Russell, politician, mayor of Nelson (1956–62) (born 1906)

=== December ===
- 1 December – Ray Hanna, pilot, leader of RAF Red Arrows display team (born 1928)
- 4 December
  - Errol Brathwaite, writer (born 1924)
  - Joan Donley, midwife (born 1916)
- 7 December – Colin Chambers, swimmer (born 1926)
- 12 December – Max Mariu, first Māori Roman Catholic bishop (born 1952)
- 18 December – Doug Dye, microbiologist (born 1921)
- 22 December – Marty McDonnell, Australian rules footballer (born 1920)

== See also ==
- History of New Zealand
- List of years in New Zealand
- Military history of New Zealand
- Timeline of New Zealand history
- Timeline of New Zealand's links with Antarctica
- Timeline of the New Zealand environment
