= Natcom =

Natcom may refer to:

- National communism, a political ideology combining communism and nationalism
- National Communications Corporation Limited (NATCOM), a New Zealand provider of Internet access and related services
- Natcom Bancshares, the parent of National Bank of Commerce in Superior, Wisconsin
- National Communication Association, a scholarly society
- National Aviation Consultants, a Canadian airline which uses the code NATCOM
- National Communications Magazine
- National Commuter Airlines, a former operator of Aérospatiale N 262
- National Telecom S.A, a Haitian mobile telecommunications company
