= 2004 in New Zealand =

- Decades: 1980s; 1990s; 2000s; 2010s; 2020s
- See also: History of New Zealand; List of years in New Zealand; Timeline of New Zealand history

The following lists events that happened during 2004 in New Zealand.

== Population ==
- Estimated population as of 31 December: 4,114,300.
- Increase since 31 December 2003: 52,800 (1.30%).
- Males per 100 Females: 96.1.

== Incumbents ==
=== Regal and viceregal ===
- Head of State – Elizabeth II
- Governor-General – Dame Silvia Cartwright
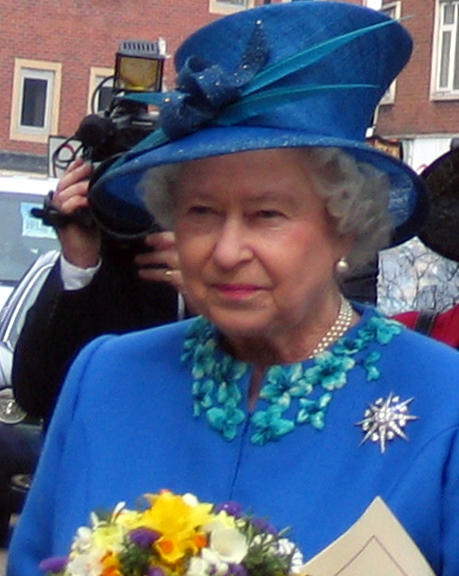
Elizabeth II

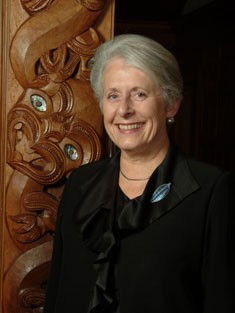
Dame Silva Cartwright

=== Government ===
The 47th New Zealand Parliament continued. Government was a coalition between Labour and the small Progressive party with United Future supporting confidence and supply votes.

- Speaker of the House – Jonathan Hunt (Labour)
- Prime Minister – Helen Clark (Labour)
- Deputy Prime Minister – Michael Cullen (Labour)
- Minister of Finance – Michael Cullen (Labour)
- Minister of Foreign Affairs – Phil Goff (Labour)
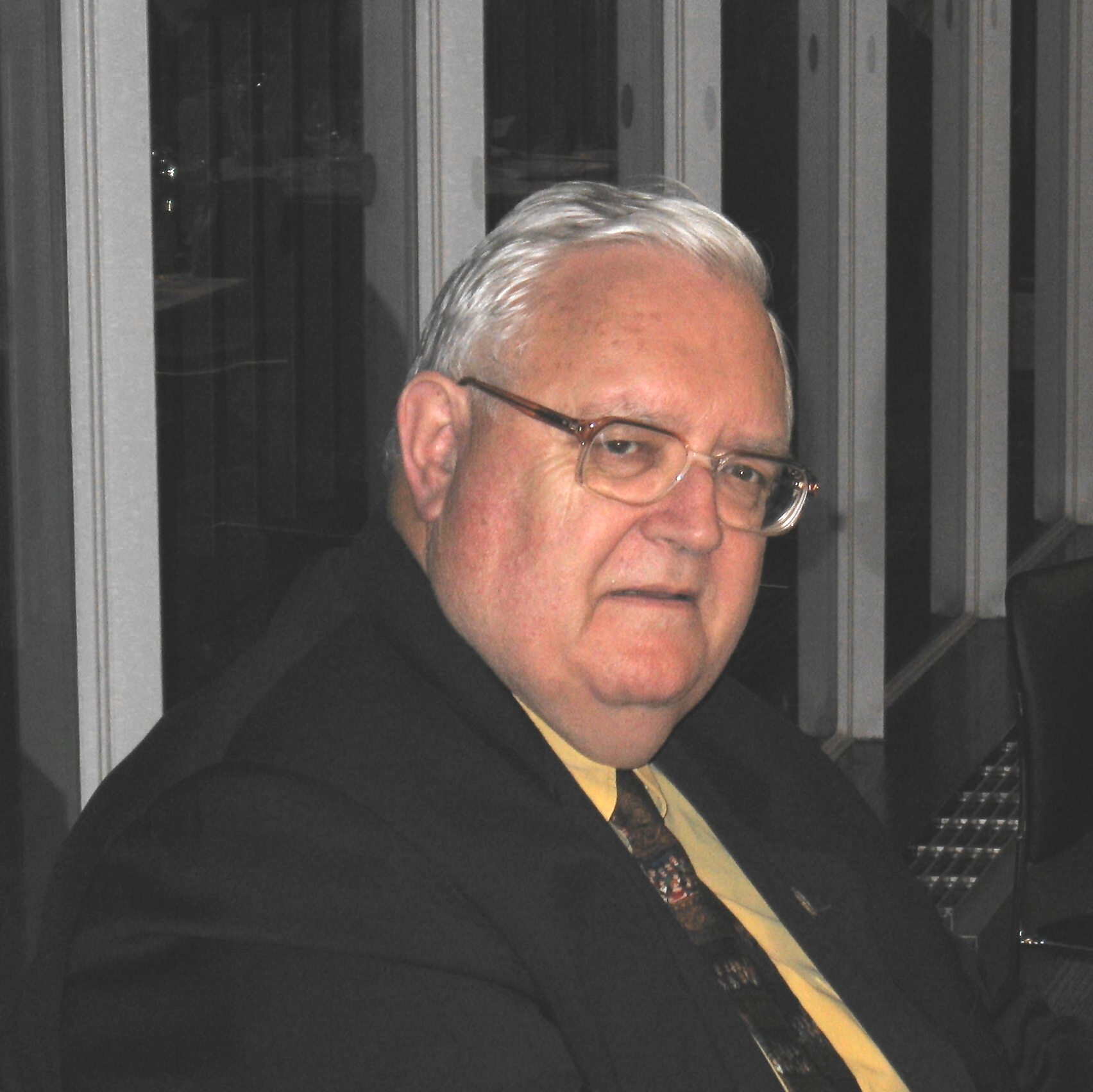
Jonathan Hunt

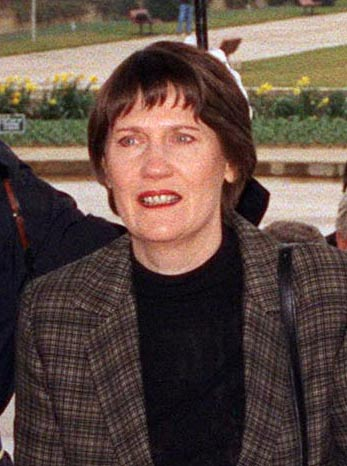
Helen Clark

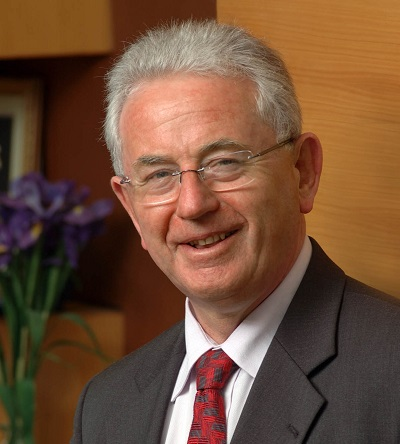
Michael Cullen

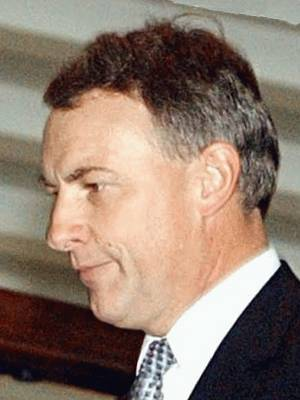
Phil Goff

=== Opposition leaders ===
- National – Don Brash (Leader of the Opposition)
- Greens – Jeanette Fitzsimons and Rod Donald
- Act – Richard Prebble to Rodney Hide
- New Zealand First – Winston Peters
- United Future – Peter Dunne
- Māori Party – Tariana Turia

=== Judiciary ===
- Chief Justice — Sian Elias
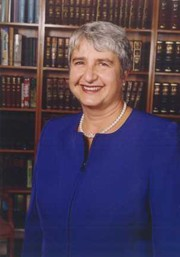
Dame Sian Elias

=== Main centre leaders ===
- Mayor of Auckland – John Banks to Dick Hubbard
- Mayor of Tauranga – Stuart Crosby
- Mayor of Hamilton – David Braithwaite to Michael Redman
- Mayor of Wellington – Kerry Prendergast
- Mayor of Christchurch – Garry Moore
- Mayor of Dunedin – Sukhi Turner to Peter Chin
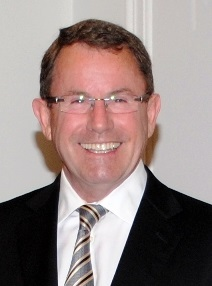
John Banks

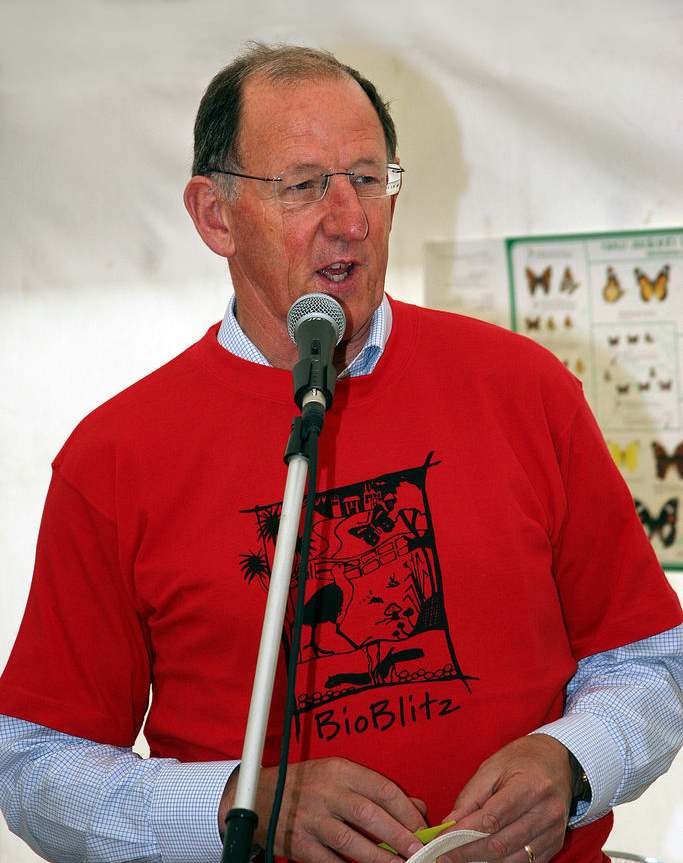
Dick Hubbard

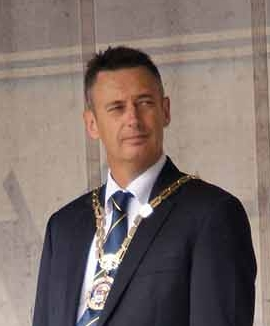
Stuart Crosby

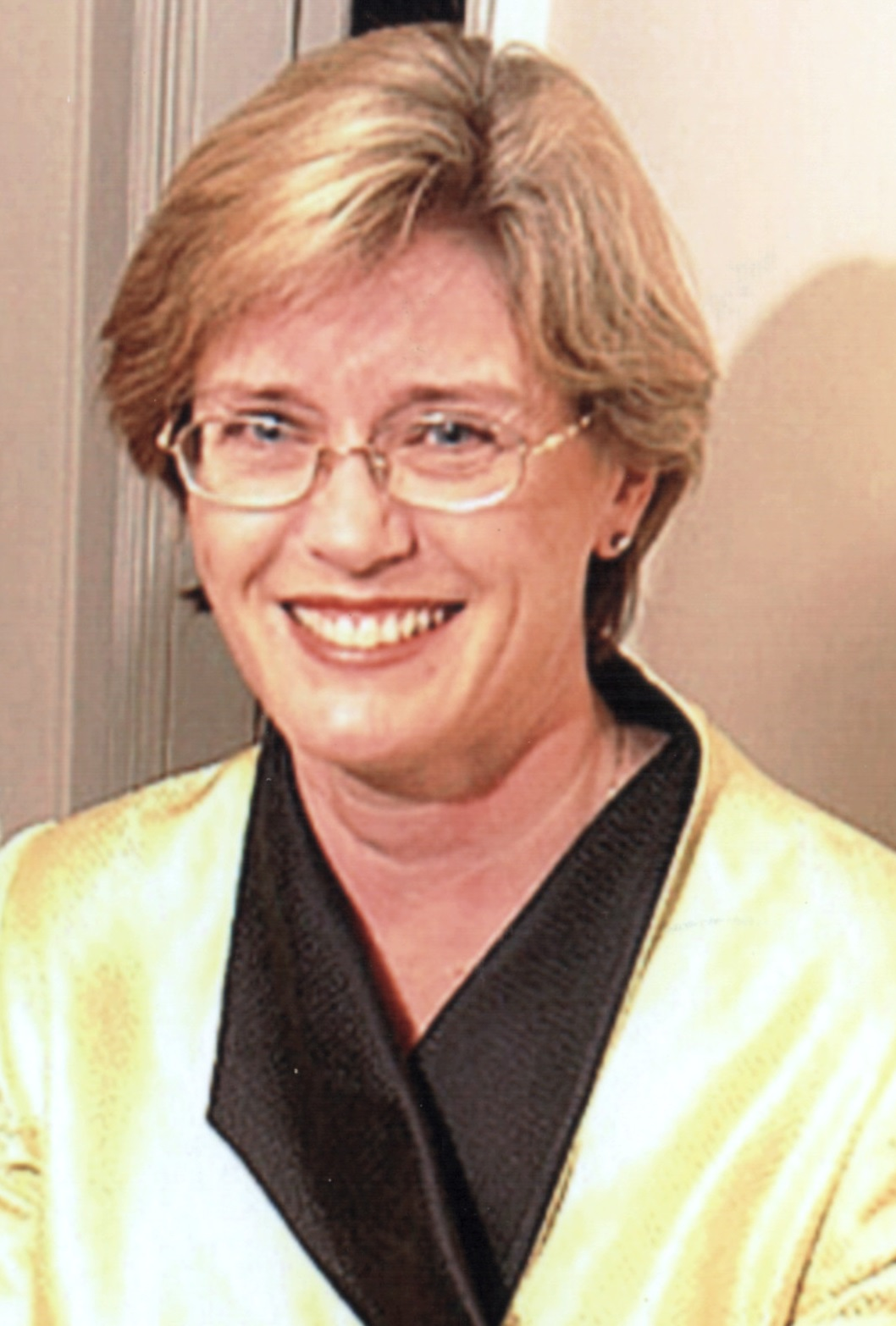
Kerry Prendergast

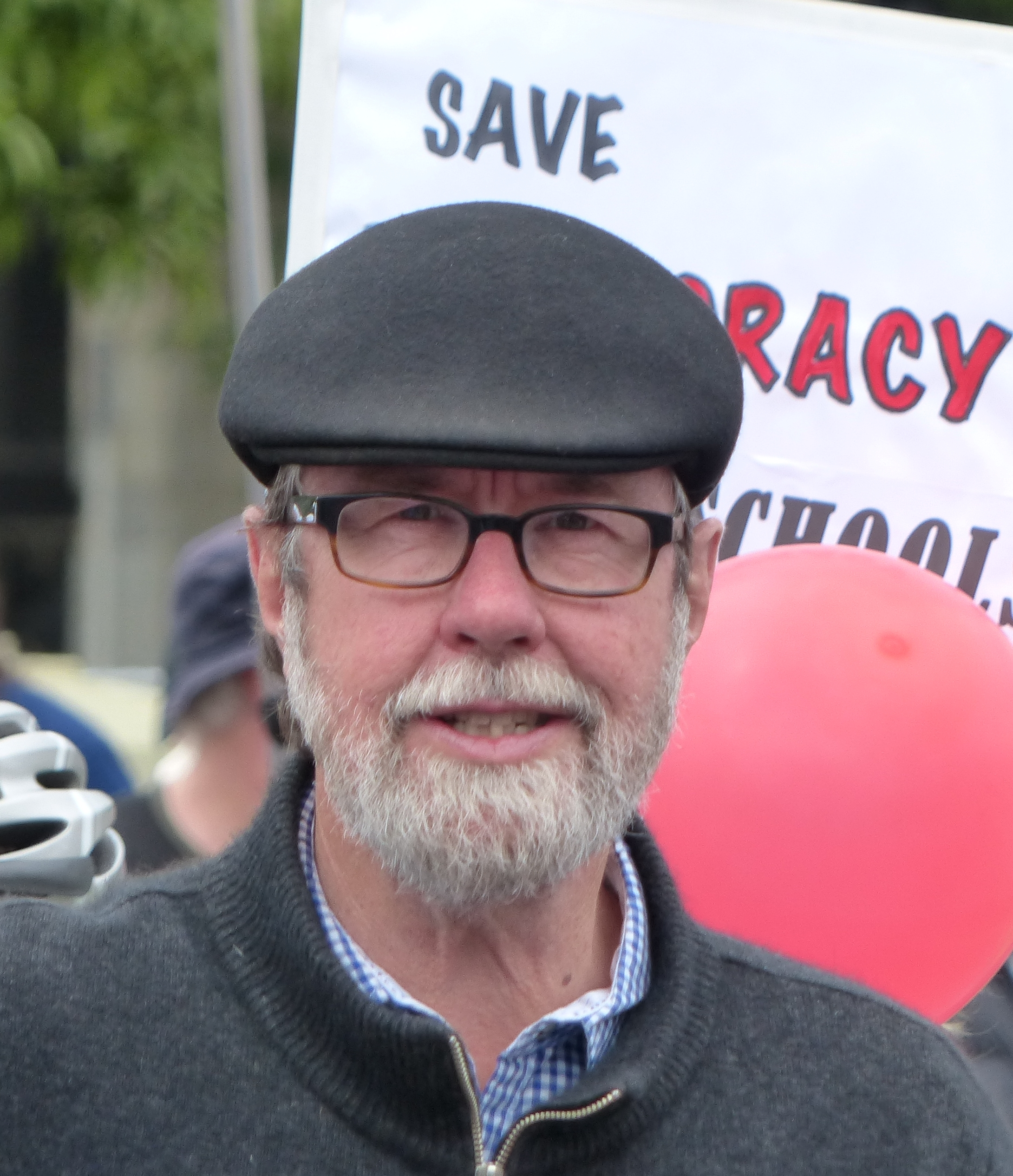
Garry Moore

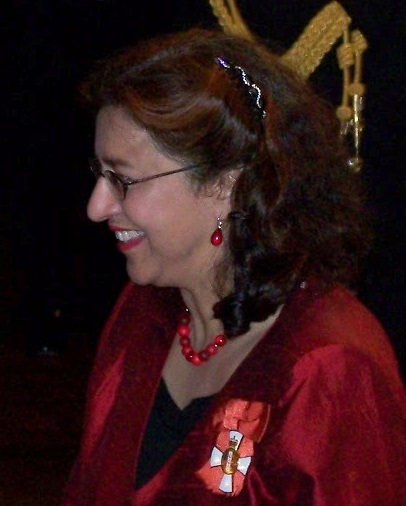
Sukhi Turner

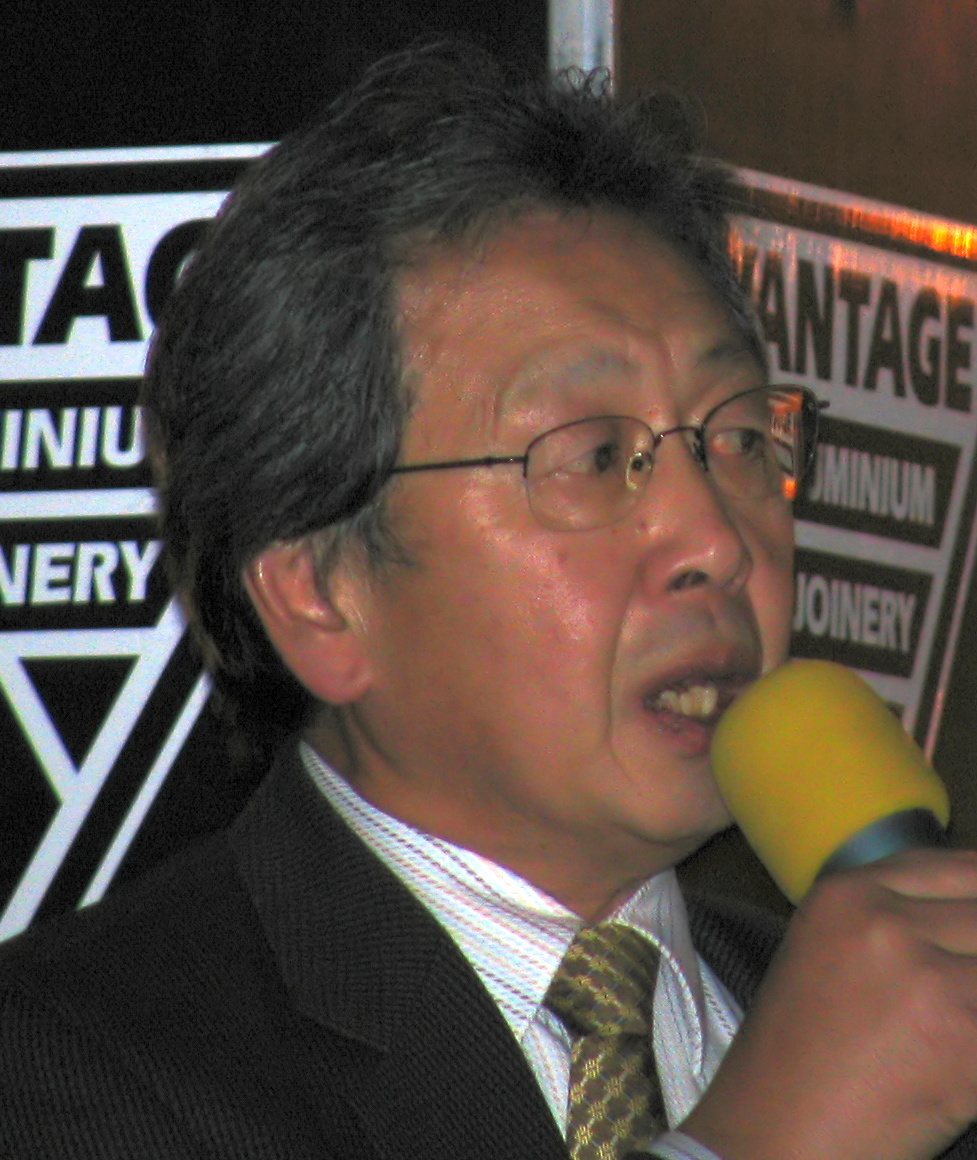
Peter Chin

=== Other ===
- State Services Commissioner – Mark Prebble

== Events ==
=== January ===
- 27 January: National Party leader Don Brash delivers a speech at Orewa highly critical of the government's policy towards Māori.

=== February ===
- 16 February: A state of emergency is declared in Manawatu-Wanganui due to flooding.
- 17 February: A state of emergency is declared in Marlborough, Taranaki and the Bay of Plenty Region.

=== April ===
- 8 April: New Zealand First party announces it would give its support to the government's foreshore legislation.
- 30 April: Tariana Turia announces she will vote against the Government's foreshore and seabed legislation.

=== May ===
- 5 May: A hīkoi against the foreshore and seabed legislation arrives in Wellington.
- 7 May: The government's foreshore and seabed Bill passes its first vote in Parliament.
- 11 May: The Criminal Records (Clean Slate) Act is passed. The Act allows people who have not reoffended for seven years to not declare minor criminal convictions in most circumstances.

=== June ===
- 16 June: A meteorite crashes into an Auckland house, becoming the ninth recovered meteorite in New Zealand.
- 30 June: Statistics New Zealand estimates for this date put the Cities of Lower Hutt and Tauranga at over 100,000 residents for the first time and Waimakariri District at over 40,000

=== July ===
- 1 July: First sitting of the new Supreme Court.
- 10 July: Te Tai Hauauru by-election won by Tariana Turia for the new Māori Party.
- 15 July: 2004 Israel–New Zealand passport scandal: New Zealand imposes diplomatic sanctions against Israel after two Israeli citizens are convicted of passport fraud.

=== August ===
- 2 August: Around 7,500 Destiny Church members march on Parliament in black shirts to protest liberal social policies.
- 15 August: Tornado in Waitara. Two fatalities when a farmhouse is destroyed.
- 19 August: Cereal maker Dick Hubbard announces he is running for the position of Mayor of Auckland.

=== October ===
- 6 October: Waikato Hospital doctors complete a 22-hour surgery to separate a pair of conjoined twins.
- 9 October: 2004 local body and health board elections completed, but not all of the counting; and some results need to wait for special votes. All three West Coast mayors unseated, along with several in more populous centres such as Auckland.
- 11 October: Disappearance under controversial circumstances of Iraena Asher at Piha, a West Auckland beach.

=== November ===
- 1 November: A reciprocal working holiday agreement between New Zealand and Belgium comes into effect.
- 18 November: Legislation passed vesting ownership of all land up to the high tide mark in New Zealand with the Crown.
- 23 November: A magnitude 7.0 earthquake strikes south-west of the South Island.
- 29 November: The Criminal Records (Clean Slate) Act comes into force.

=== December ===
- 9 December: The Supreme Court of New Zealand granted Ahmed Zaoui bail. He will reside in the Dominican Friary in Auckland. He will have to report to the police twice a week and must spend each night in the friary.
- 9 December: The Civil Unions Act is passed. The Act establishes the new institution of civil union, available to same-sex and de facto couples.
- 10 December: Smoking is banned in workplaces or licensed premises.
- 26 December: 5 New Zealanders are among the victims of the 2004 Indian Ocean earthquake and tsunami.

=== Undated ===
- National Communications Corporation Limited is founded.

== Arts and literature ==
=== Awards ===
- Katherine Duignan wins the Robert Burns Fellowship.

==== Montana Book Awards 2004 ====
- Deutz Medal for Fiction – Slow Water by Annamarie Jagose
- Montana Medal for Non-fiction – The Trial of the Cannibal Dog by Anne Salmond
- Readers' Choice – Penguin History of New Zealand by Michael King
- Poetry – Sing-song by Anne Kennedy
- History – The Trial of the Cannibal Dog by Anne Salmond
- Lifestyle and contemporary culture – Classic fly fishing in New Zealand Rivers by David Hallett and John Kent
- Biography – Mason by Rachael Barrowman
- Illustrative – Central by Arno Gasteiger
- Reference & Anthology – Whetu Moana: Contemporary Polynesian Poetry in English
- Environment – Deep New Zealand: Blue Water, Black Abyss by Peter Batson
- A.W. Reed Award for Contribution to New Zealand Literature – Joy Cowley

=== Music ===
==== New Zealand Music Awards ====
New categories introduced were 'Best Rock Album', 'People's Choice Award' and 'Airplay Record of the Year'. 'New Zealand Radio Programmer of the Year' was retired.

- Album of the Year: Scribe (rapper) – The Crusader
- Single of the Year: Scribe – Stand Up
- Best Group: Dimmer – You've Got To Hear The Music
- Breakthrough Artist of the Year: Brooke Fraser – What To Do With Daylight
- Best Male Solo Artist: Scribe – The Crusader
- Best Female Solo Artist: Brooke Fraser – What To Do With Daylight
- Highest Selling Nz Album: Hayley Westenra – Pure
- Highest Selling Nz Single: Ben Lummis – They Can't Take That Away
- Songwriter of the Year: Scribe, P-Money, Con Psy & Savage (rapper) – Not Many : The Remix!
- Best Music Video: Chris Graham – Stand Up (Scribe)
- Best Rock Album (new category): Dimmer – You've Got To Hear The Music
- Best Urban/Hip Hop Album: Scribe – The Crusader
- Best Dance/Electronica Album: Salmonella Dub – One Drop East
- Best Maori Album: Ruia – Hawaiki
- Best Pacific Music Album: Te Vaka – Tutuki
- Best Jazz Album: The Rodger Fox Big Band – A Rare Connection
- Best Classical Album: John Psathas – Psathas : Fragments
- Best Gospel / Christian Album: Magnify – In Wonder
- International Achievement: Hayley Westenra
- People's Choice Award (new category): Scribe
- Best Producer: P-Money – The Crusader (Scribe)
- Best Engineer: Chris Van De Geer – Passenger – (Carly Binding)
- Best Album Cover: Ben Sciascia – Postage (Supergroove)
- Airplay Record of the Year (new category): Goldenhorse – Maybe Tomorrow
- Best Country Music Album: Donna Dean – Money
- Best Country Music Song: Donna Dean – Work It Out
- Best Folk Album: Brendyn Montgomery And Mike Considine – Mountain Air
- Lifetime Achievement Award: Shaun Joyce

==== Performing arts ====
- Benny Award presented by the Variety Artists Club of New Zealand to Eldred Stebbing MNZM.

=== Television ===
- 28 March: Māori Television commences.
- 22 September: Animated series bro'Town premieres on TV3.
- The Insider's Guide To Happiness

=== Film ===
- 29 February: The Lord of the Rings: The Return of the King wins all 11 Academy Awards for which it was nominated.
- Fracture
- In My Father's Den
- Kaikohe Demolition

=== Internet ===
See: NZ Internet History

== Sport ==
=== Athletics ===
- Dale Warrender wins his first national title in the men's marathon, clocking 2:23:40 on 1 May in Rotorua, while Nyla Carroll claims her second in the women's championship (2:46:44).

=== Basketball ===
- The National Basketball League was won by the Auckland Stars who beat the Nelson Giants 80–68 in the final.
- The Women's National Basketball League was won by the Canterbury Wildcats who beat the Nelson Sparks 68–58 in the final.

=== Cricket ===
- The State Championship for 2003–04 was won by the Wellington Firebirds.
- In December Australia and New Zealand played a series of 3 one-day matches in Australia for the inaugural Chappell–Hadlee Trophy. After winning one game each, the decider was washed out by rain, so the trophy was shared.

=== Horse racing ===
==== Harness racing ====
- New Zealand Trotting Cup: Just An Excuse – 2nd win
- Auckland Trotting Cup: Elsu – 2nd win

=== Olympic Games ===
- New Zealand sends a team of 148 competitors in 18 sports.

Gold	Silver	Bronze	Total
3	2	0	5

=== Paralympics ===
- New Zealand sends a team of 35 competitors across nine sports.

Gold	Silver	Bronze	Total
6	1	3	10

=== Rugby league ===
- Bartercard Cup won by the Mt Albert Lions

=== Rugby union ===
- June – July: 2004 Philips International Series: The All Blacks beat England 36–3, England 36–12, Argentina 41-7 and Pacific Islanders rugby union team 41–26.
- 17 July: The All Blacks beat Australia 16–7 at Westpac Stadium as part of the 2004 Tri Nations Series
- 24 July: The All Blacks beat South Africa 23–21 at Jade Stadium as part of the 2004 Tri Nations Series
- 7 August: The All Blacks lose 18–23 to Australia at Telstra Stadium as part of the 2004 Tri Nations Series
- 14 August: The All Blacks lose 26–40 to South Africa at Ellis Park Stadium as part of the 2004 Tri Nations Series
- 15 August: Bay of Plenty beat Auckland 33-28 to take the Ranfurly Shield
- 5 September: Canterbury beat Bay of Plenty 33-26 to take the Ranfurly Shield
- 13 November: The All Blacks beat Italy 59–10 at Stadio Flaminio as part of the 2004 All Black Tour of Europe
- 20 November: The All Blacks beat Wales 26–25 at Millennium Stadium as part of the 2004 All Black Tour of Europe
- 27 November: The All Blacks beat France 45–6 at Stade de France as part of the 2004 All Black Tour of Europe
- 4 December: The All Blacks beat The Barbarians 47–9 at Twickenham as part of the 2004 All Black Tour of Europe

=== Shooting ===
- Ballinger Belt –
  - Edd Newman (United States)
  - John Whiteman (Upper Hutt), second, top New Zealander

=== Soccer ===
- The Chatham Cup is won by Miramar Rangers who beat Waitakere City F.C. 1–0 in the final after extra time.

== Births ==
- 1 January – Sylvia Brunt, rugby union player
- 7 January – Isaiah Armstrong-Ravula, rugby union player
- 8 February
  - Jorja Miller, rugby union player
  - Georgia Plimmer, cricketer
- 18 February – Isaiya Katoa, rugby league player
- 19 February – Luca Harrington, freestyle skier
- 25 February – Cody Vai, rugby union player
- 3 March – Tanner Stowers-Smith, rugby league player
- 15 March – Demitric Sifakula, rugby league player
- 27 March – Jamal Todd, cricketer
- 8 April – Fran Jonas, cricketer
- 14 April – Keano Kini, rugby league player
- 15 April – Malachi Wrampling-Alec, rugby union player
- 22 April – Emma Findlay, field hockey player
- 23 April – Payton Spencer, rugby union player
- 8 May – Izzy Gaze, cricketer
- 10 May – Jenna Hastings, mountain biker
- 12 July – Laura Littlejohn, swimmer
- 14 August – Jay Herdman, association footballer
- 8 October – C'est La Guerre, Thoroughbred racehorse
- 14 October – Lewis Bower, cyclist
- 3 November – Auckland Reactor, Standardbred racehorse
- 1 December – Joshua Willmer, swimmer
- 18 December – Tristyn Cook, rugby union player
- 29 December – Ruby Star Andrews, freestyle skier

=== Exact date unlisted ===
- Allen Chi Zhou Fan, chess player
- Vyanla Punsalan, chess player

== Deaths ==
=== January ===
- 11 January – Sir Peter Elworthy, farmer, farming leader, businessman (born 1935)
- 19 January – Murray Watkinson, rower (born 1939)
- 21 January – Jock Newall, association football player (born 1917)
- 25 January – Sonny Schmidt, bodybuilder (born 1953)
- 29 January – Janet Frame, writer (born 1924)

=== February ===
- 11 February – June Westbury, politician (born 1921)
- 14 February – Jock Butterfield, rugby league player (born 1932)
- 16 February – Don Cleverley, cricketer (born 1909)
- 17 February – Sir Peter Quilliam, jurist (born 1920)
- 21 February – Norval Morris, lawyer, criminologist, novelist (born 1923)
- 26 February – Roger Mirams, filmmaker (born 1918)
- 29 February – Graham Gordon, doctor (born 1927)

=== March ===
- 1 March – John Lithgow, politician (born 1933)
- 3 March – Susan Moller Okin, feminist political philosopher (born 1946)
- 4 March – Arthur Kinsella, politician (born 1918)
- 5 March – Martin Emond, cartoon illustrator and painter (born 1969)
- 8 March – Frank Mooney, cricketer (born 1921)
- 17 March – Sir William Pickering, rocket scientist (born 1910)
- 19 March – Chris Timms, sailor (born 1947)
- 30 March – Michael King, historian and biographer (born 1945)

=== April ===
- 6 April – Joan Monahan (née Hastings), swimmer, botanist and schoolteacher (born 1925)
- 16 April – John Caselberg, writer and poet (born 1927)

=== May ===
- 3 May – Rahera Windsor, founding member and kuia of Ngāti Rānana (born 1925)
- 15 May – Hector Wilson, rugby union player (born 1924)
- 17 May – Ken Mudford, motorcycle racer (born 1923)
- 19 May
  - Rowan Barbour, cricketer (born 1922)
  - Tim Hewat, television producer and journalist (born 1928)
- 21 May – Frank McMullen, rugby union player and referee (born 1933)
- 22 May – Wayne Kimber, politician (born 1949)

=== June ===
- 5 June – Jack Foster, athlete (born 1932)
- 24 June
  - Pat Kelly, trade union leader (born 1929)
  - Ron Sharp, farmer, inventor of the herringbone milking shed (born 1919)
- 25 June – Morton Coutts, inventor, brewer (born 1904)

=== July ===
- 5 July – Robert Burchfield, lexicographer (born 1923)
- 11 July – Sir Terry McLean, sports journalist and writer (born 1913)
- 22 July – Paul Clarkin, polo player (born 1950)
- 28 July
  - Graham Nuthall, educationist (born 1935)
  - Dame Janet Paul, publisher, painter and art historian (born 1919)
- 29 July – Maurice Dixon, rugby union player (born 1929)

=== August ===
- 14 August
  - Eric Petrie, cricketer (born 1927)
  - Sir Trevor Skeet, politician (born 1918)
- 21 August – Amelia Batistich, writer (born 1915)
- 23 August – Trevor Blake, cricketer (born 1937)
- 25 August – Roger Broughton, cricketer (born 1958)
- 26 August – Bill Marsters, Cook Islands religious leader (born 1923)

=== September ===
- 1 September – Sir Alan Stewart, university administrator (born 1917)
- 2 September – Alan Preston, association football player and cricketer (born 1932)
- 11 September – Ruth Symons, cricketer (born 1913)
- 20 September – Pat Hanly, painter (born 1932)
- 29 September – David Jackson, boxer (born 1955)

=== October ===
- 5 October – Maurice Wilkins, physicist and molecular biologist (born 1916)
- 10 October – Maurice Shadbolt, writer and playwright (born 1932)
- 23 October – George Silk, photojournalist (born 1916)

=== November ===
- 1 November – Barry Brown, boxer (born 1931)
- 7 November – Eddie Charlton, snooker and billiards player (born 1929)
- 8 November – Frank Houston, religious leader (born 1922)
- 12 November – Jim Eyles, archaeologist (born 1926)

=== December ===
- 8 December – Noel Mills, rower (born 1944)
- 11 December – Arthur Lydiard, athlete, athletics coach (born 1917)
- 17 December – Ray Dowker, cricketer and association football player (born 1919)
- 29 December – Liddy Holloway, actor and television scriptwriter (born 1947)

== See also ==
- List of years in New Zealand
- Timeline of New Zealand history
- History of New Zealand
- Military history of New Zealand
- Timeline of the New Zealand environment
- Timeline of New Zealand's links with Antarctica

For world events and topics in 2004 not specifically related to New Zealand see: 2004
