= Nathan Twaddle =

New Zealand rower

Nathan Twaddle MNZM
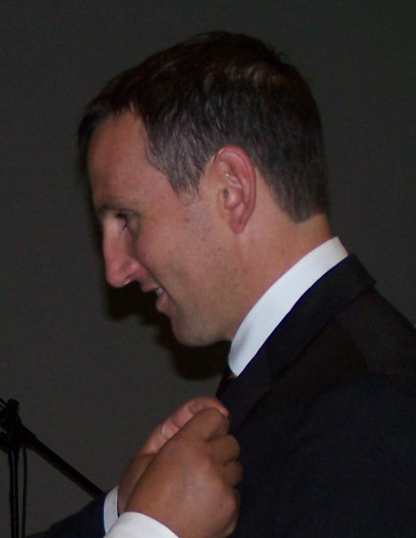
- Twaddle in 2009

Personal information
- Born: 21 August 1976 (age 50)
Medal record
Men's rowing
Representing New Zealand
Olympic Games
Bronze medal – third place	2008 Beijing	Coxless pair
World Rowing Championships
Gold medal – first place	2005 Gifu	Coxless pair
Silver medal – second place	2006 Eton	Coxless pair
Silver medal – second place	2007 Munich	Coxless pair

Robert Nathan Twaddle MNZM (born 21 August 1976) is a New Zealand former rower and Olympic medallist. He competed at the 2008 Summer Olympics in Beijing, in the coxless pair rowing with his partner George Bridgewater and won a bronze medal.

The pair began representing New Zealand together in 2004 and won bronze medals at the 2008 Summer Olympics in Beijing.

Twaddle was born in Whakatane, New Zealand. He crewed for the Otago University and Auckland Rowing Clubs, and won several titles at New Zealand Rowing Championships, including the single sculls championships.

Twaddle crewed firstly for New Zealand at the World Championships in Milan Italy in 2003, qualifying for the Athens Olympics with pairs partner Robert Hellstrom.

The following year, Twaddle and Bridgwater were paired together and finished fourth in the pairs final at the Athens Olympics.

Twaddle and Bridgewater were world champions in 2005. They won a gold medal at the World Rowing Championships in Gifu Prefecture, Japan, in the Magic 45 minutes where four New Zealand crews won gold medals. The pair were silver medallists in the 2006 and 2007 World Rowing Championships.

The pair were named Halberg Team of the Year in 2005.

Twaddle retired from international rowing in 2011.

In the 2009 New Year Honours, Twaddle was appointed a Member of the New Zealand Order of Merit, for services to rowing.

He was part of the International Olympic Broadcasting Commentary team for the 2016 summer Olympics in Rio.

Twaddle is a graduate of the Otago University, with a degree in Physical Education. He has post-graduate studies in finance. Following his rowing career, Twaddle worked as an Advisor for High Performance Sport New Zealand.

Twaddle is a member of the New Zealand Olympic Committee Athletes Commission, having held the position since 2009. He is the current Chair of that Commission, and a member of the NZOC Board.

== Career highlights ==
Prior to winning Olympic bronze, Twaddle and Bridgewater were world champions in 2005 and silver medalists in 2006 and 2007.

SoL Chapter Pres. 2017
