= George Bridgewater =

New Zealand rower

George Bridgewater MNZM
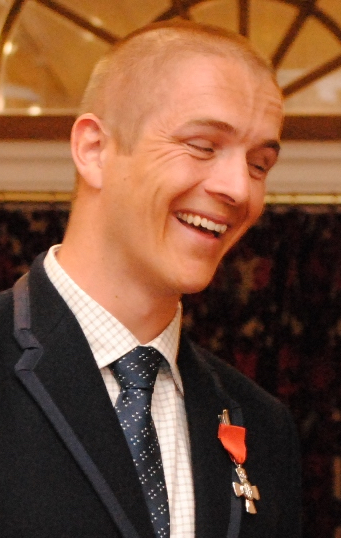
- Bridgewater in 2012

Personal information
- Born: George Spencer Bridgewater; 18 January 1983 (age 43) Wellington, New Zealand
- Height: 2.00 m (6 ft 7 in)
- Weight: 97 kg (214 lb)
Medal record
Men's rowing
Representing New Zealand
Olympic Games
Bronze medal – third place	2008 Beijing	Coxless pair
World Rowing Championships
Gold medal – first place	2005 Gifu	Coxless pair
Silver medal – second place	2006 Eton	Coxless pair
Silver medal – second place	2007 Munich	Coxless pair

George Spencer Bridgewater MNZM (born 18 January 1983) is a former New Zealand rower who competed in the pair at international level with Nathan Twaddle. The pair began representing New Zealand together in 2004 and won bronze medals at the 2008 Summer Olympics in Beijing. Bridgewater went to his third Summer Olympics in 2016 in Rio de Janeiro.

== Rowing career ==
Bridgewater was born in 1983 in Wellington, New Zealand. He rowed for the Avon club based in Christchurch, and won several titles at New Zealand Rowing Championships, beginning in 2002.

Bridgewater and Twaddle finished fourth in the pairs final at the Athens Olympics. They won a gold medal at the World Rowing Championships in Gifu Prefecture, Japan, in 2005, in the Magic 45 minutes where four New Zealand crews won gold medals. The pair finished second in the 2006 and 2007 World Rowing Championships.

In 2008, following the Beijing Olympics, Bridgewater matriculated at Oriel College, Oxford, where he was part of the winning crew in the 155th University Boat Race on 29 March 2009, rowing at seven. While at Oxford, Bridgewater stroked the Oriel College 1st Eight in Summer Eights, bumping Balliol College to finish 3rd on the river.

In the 2009 New Year Honours, Bridgewater was appointed a Member of the New Zealand Order of Merit, for services to rowing. Later that year he graduated from the University of Oxford Saïd Business School with an MBA. He worked for Morgan Stanley in Singapore, but returned to New Zealand in June 2014 to prepare for the 2016 Olympics. He competed in the quadruple sculls at Rio with Nathan Flannery, John Storey, and Jade Uru, and the team came tenth.

== Private life ==
Bridgewater has two children.
