= Magic 45 minutes =

The magic 45 minutes describes the duration of one of the most rewarding sporting periods in the history of New Zealand during which four New Zealand rowing teams won gold medals in four successive finals to be the most successful country at the 2005 World Rowing Championships in Gifu, Japan.

== 2005 World Rowing Championships ==
The success of the New Zealanders was the first time any country had won four golds at any world championships since the former East Germany in 1987, an achievement which prompted New Zealand's largest newspaper, The New Zealand Herald, to scream "FOARSOME" in a banner headline. New Zealand has a population creeping just over 4,000,000—roughly a fifth of the population of Metropolitan New York—but is internationally recognised as regularly punching well above its weight in international sporting competition.

New Zealand has previously won four Olympic golds in a single sport (canoeing) at a single games but that was over two days on Lake Casitas at the 1984 Los Angeles Olympics. The previous shortest time between winning gold medals was less than an hour when the great Peter Snell (800 m) and Murray Halberg (5000 m) triumphed at the Rome Olympics in 1960.

On this magic 45 minutes occasion, New Zealand had five teams in the rowing finals, an achievement that astonished the international rowing fraternity at Gifu. New Zealanders at home in New Zealand were hoping that maybe two gold medals would be achievable. But in only 45 minutes, the New Zealanders won four golds and the New Zealand flag proudly flew four times as the national anthem was played four times in succession.

The four victories were:

- Mahé Drysdale of Tauranga, in the men's single sculls, won gold from the current Olympic champion, Olaf Tufte, of Norway. New Zealand was searching for a single sculler to succeed Rob Waddell who had won the world championships in 1998 and 1999 and a gold medal the Sydney Olympics, and unexpectedly, here he was.
- Juliette Haigh and Nicky Coles, in the women's coxless pair, won from Australians Natalie Bale and Sarah Outhwaite. It was vindication for Haigh and Coles who embarrassingly fell into the water at the 2004 Olympics at Athens and therefore could not display their talents.
- George Bridgewater and Nathan Twaddle, in the men's coxless pair, defeated South Africa with Italy third.
- Identical twin sisters Caroline and Georgina Evers-Swindell won the women's double sculls, defeating Bulgaria, with Australia third. As they had previously won world titles, and the gold medal at Athens, they were confidently expected to perform well and did not let their legion of New Zealand fans down.

The men's coxless four of Donald Leach, Carl Meyer, Eric Murray and Steven Cottle finished sixth in their final.

== FISA awards ==
In November 2005, New Zealand head coach, Dick Tonks was named the 2005 Coach of the Year by FISA, the International Rowing Federation, and the Evers-Swindell sisters were named Female Crew of the Year.

== See also ==
- Super Saturday
