= Kevin Smith (conservationist) =

New Zealand conservationist (1953–2005)

Kevin David Smith (21 November 1953 – 16 August 2005) was a New Zealand conservationist.

Smith was born in Ōwhango, a small town in the King Country. He was active in the area of forest conservation. In 1985 Smith was employed by Royal Forest and Bird Protection Society of New Zealand as a West Coast conservation officer before being appointed as the Society's conservation director in 1989. He remained as the director until 2000 when he was employed as an adviser to Minister of Conservation Sandra Lee-Vercoe. He continued as an adviser to Minister of Conservation Chris Carter.

He has been credited as playing a major role in conservation efforts in New Zealand, including being instrumental in ending the logging of native forests on the West Coast.

He died suddenly on 16 August 2005 while cycling with his daughter in Wellington.
