= Mark Beban =

New Zealand cricketer, priest and teacher (1940–2005)

- Beban at Roncalli College in 1996

Personal information
- Full name: Mark Albert Beban
- Born: 3 February 1940; Greymouth, New Zealand
- Died: 4 April 2005 (aged 65); Wellington, New Zealand
- Batting: Right-handed
- Bowling: Right-arm off-spin

Domestic team information
- Years: Team
- 1969–70: Wellington

Career statistics
Competition	First-class
Matches	4
Runs scored	28
Batting average	5.60
100s/50s	0/0
Top score	17
Balls bowled	752
Wickets	7
Bowling average	37.28
5 wickets in innings	0
10 wickets in match	0
Best bowling	3/96
Catches/stumpings	3/0
- Source: Cricinfo, 22 April 2026

Mark Albert Beban (3 February 1940 – 4 April 2005) was a New Zealand cricketer, priest and schoolteacher.

Beban played four first-class matches for Wellington in the 1969–70 season. He is one of the few ordained Roman Catholic priests to play first-class cricket, and the only one in New Zealand. He also played for Hawke's Bay in the Hawke Cup.

Beban became a teacher. He was the foundation principal of Roncalli College in Timaru, serving in that position from 1982 to 1996, as well as coaching the school's cricket team.
