= Roger Broughton =

New Zealand cricketer

Roger Dean Broughton (7 October 1958, Gisborne – 25 August 2004, Hiruharama) was a New Zealand cricketer who played 21 first-class matches and 16 limited-overs for the Northern Districts Knights in the 1980s. He also played for Poverty Bay in the Hawke Cup. A right-handed batsman, he scored one century and three half-centuries in first-class cricket at an average of 22.56.
