= Frontier of Dreams =

Television series

- Genre: Documentary
- Country of origin: New Zealand
- No. of episodes: 13

Original release
- Network: TVNZ
- Release: September 24, 2005

Frontier of Dreams is a 2005 New Zealand documentary television series. It covered the history of New Zealand from its geological past through to the present day in 13 one-hour episodes, and was broadcast by Television New Zealand from 24 September 2005 weekly until December. The series was the largest documentary ever made in New Zealand and took nearly five years to make.

A book with the same title was launched jointly with the TV series on 21 September 2005 at Te Papa.
