= Victor du Chateau =

New Zealand cricketer

Victor Henry du Chateau (1 August 1911 – 29 September 2005) was a New Zealander who played six first-class cricket matches for Wellington between 1932 and 1940.

A left-handed opening batsman, du Chateau played two matches for Wellington in 1932-33 and one in 1936–37 with no great success. Playing for Wellington College Old Boys, he began the Wellington club season in 1939–40 with three centuries, and at one stage had scored 475 runs at an average of 158.33. He was subsequently selected for all three of Wellington's Plunket Shield matches in 1939–40, but made only 83 runs.

Du Chateau married Zoe Gordon Tansley in Wellington in April 1939. He served as a gunner in New Caledonia during the Second World War.
