= National Bank of Commerce (Wisconsin) =

Full-service national bank based in Wisconsin, USA

- Formerly: Union National Bank of Superior
- Type: Private company held by NATCOM Bancshares, Inc.
- Industry: Financial services Banking
- Founded: February 7, 1934; 92 years ago
- Headquarters: Superior, Wisconsin, United States
- Area served: United States
- Key people: Brad Roden, CEO; Eric Albrecht, President; Jeremy Egnash, CFO
- Website: nbcbanking.com

National Bank of Commerce (NBC) is a full-service national bank based in Wisconsin, USA, with headquarters at 1127 Tower Ave., in downtown Superior, WI. The bank offers personal retail products and services, mortgage loans, business lending, credit and debit cards, online and mobile banking, and other financial services. NBC is the largest locally owned bank in the Twin Ports. The bank has been in the Wisconsin region since 1934.

NBC is the subsidiary of NATCOM Bancshares, Inc. NATCOM is a bank holding company primarily established in 1998 to manage the bank's assets.

== Company History ==
NBC was established in February 1934 as the Union National Bank of Superior. The bank was insured by the Federal Deposit Insurance Corporation (FDIC) on April 23, 1934.

In 1940, the company was renamed as National Bank of Commerce.

In September 1972, National Bank of Commerce acquired Poplar State Bank, establishing new branches in Poplar and Solon Springs, Wisconsin.

In 1998, the bank reorganized its operations. The company also established NATCOM Bancshares Inc., as NBC's parent holding company.

In the year 2000, National Bank of Commerce opened its first location outside of Wisconsin, in Duluth, MN.

In June 2008, NBC purchased Superior Bancorp, with $90 million in assets and two branches in Superior. The deal gave the bank $540 million in assets and a 60 percent share of Douglas County, Wisconsin deposits. NBC also acquired Community Bank in November 2008.

In December 2017, NATCOM Bancshares, Inc., NBC's holding company, obtained federal permission to buy 49% of the voting shares of Republic Bank, owned by Republic Bancshares Inc. NBC subsequently received permission to purchase the remaining shares of Republic Bank in July 2019. The merger was completed in December 2019. Following the acquisition, NBC operated 10 branches throughout northeastern Minnesota and northwestern Wisconsin, including four branches previously owned by Republic Bank. The former Republic Bank branches located in West Duluth and on Decker Rd in Duluth, MN were closed.

In 2022, NBC acquired the former City Hall building located at 1409 Hammond Ave, currently known as the Superior City Center. The additional space will be used for NBC's information technology (IT) offices, lending support services and other banking operations.

As of August 2022, NBC operates ten locations, with assets valued at $1.25 billion.

In 2024, National Bank of Commerce acquired RiverWood Bank. RiverWood Bank locations become NBC branches after the sale officially closed on December 13.

== Bank Locations ==
Sources:

- National Bank of Commerce, Superior-Main, 1127 Tower Ave, Superior, WI
- National Bank of Commerce, Superior-Midtown, 2822 Tower Avenue, Superior, WI
- National Bank of Commerce, Poplar, 4994 S Memorial Dr, Poplar WI
- National Bank of Commerce, Solon Springs, 9245 E Main St, Solon Springs, WI
- National Bank of Commerce, Duluth – East, 1314 East Superior Street, Duluth, MN
- National Bank of Commerce, Esko, 3 Thomson Road, Esko, MN
- National Bank of Commerce, Hermantown, 4105 Richard Avenue, Hermantown, MN
- National Bank of Commerce, Hibbing, 2521 First Avenue, Hibbing, MN
- National Bank of Commerce, Duluth – Woodland, 1619 Woodland Avenue, Duluth, MN
- National Bank of Commerce, Bagley, 22 1st St NE, Bagley, MN
- National Bank of Commerce, Baudette, 109 W Main St, Baudette, MN
- National Bank of Commerce, Baxter, 14540 Dellwood Dr, Baxter, MN
- National Bank of Commerce, Bemidji – Downtown, 214 5th St NW, Bemidji, MN
- National Bank of Commerce, Bemidji – Paul Bunyan Drive, 1260 Paul Bunyan Dr, Bemidji, MN
- National Bank of Commerce, Paul Bunyan, 1260 Paul Bunyan Dr NW, Bemidji, MN
- National Bank of Commerce, Benson, 1329 Pacific Ave, Benson, MN
- National Bank of Commerce, Big Lake, 240 Jefferson Blvd, Big Lake, MN
- National Bank of Commerce, Crosslake, 36139 County Road 66, Crosslake, MN
- National Bank of Commerce, International Falls, 503 4th Street, International Falls, MN
- National Bank of Commerce, Monticello, 1421 E 7th St, Monticello, MN
- National Bank of Commerce, Morris, 532 Atlantic Ave, Morris, MN

== Community Involvement ==
In December 2013, NBC donated $400,000 to the Superior High School. In exchange, the school board gave the bank naming rights to the school's outdoor athletic complex. The complex was eventually named the NBC Spartan Sports Complex.

NBC has been a longtime partner of the University of Wisconsin-Superior and Yellowjacket Athletics. The bank sponsors the Yellowjacket men's basketball program's season-opening tournament.

In April 2022, NBC was recognized by the Entrepreneur Fund with the Community Catalyst Award. The award was presented at the Regional Economic Indicators Forum held on April 5.

The bank is also one of the largest known subscribers to Superior Water, Light & Power's community solar garden.
