= National Communications Corporation Limited =

Telecommunications company in New Zealand

National Communications Corporation Limited (trading as NATCOM) is a privately held New Zealand limited company based in Auckland. It was incorporated on 14 June 2004 (company number 1525546, NZBN 9429035332770). As of its most recent annual return (filed August 2026), the company is registered and classified under ANZSIC code K624030 as a holding company operation engaged in passive investment in subsidiary companies. Its sole director is Frayne Craig Cooke (appointed 14 June 2004). The registered office and address for service is 20a Rotomahana Terrace, Remuera, Auckland 1050.

NATCOM provides managed fibre Internet services and Internet security products for New Zealand business, and is a developer and supplier of Wi-Fi, internet security and content filtering services.

Founded in 2004 as a network owner and operator with one of NATCOM's early developments, FIVO, a wif-fi hotspot operation was sold to NZX-listed company SmartPay Limited.

Today, NATCOM is a specialist Enterprise Communications Service Provider with its core offering being managed enterprise data via fibre optic networks. NATCOM continues to provide WiMAX services in Auckland City and offers satellite bandwidth services to rural enterprise.

== See also ==
- Telecommunications in New Zealand
